= Hugh Roe O'Donnell =

Irish clan chief and military leader (1572–1602)

Hugh Roe O'Donnell II
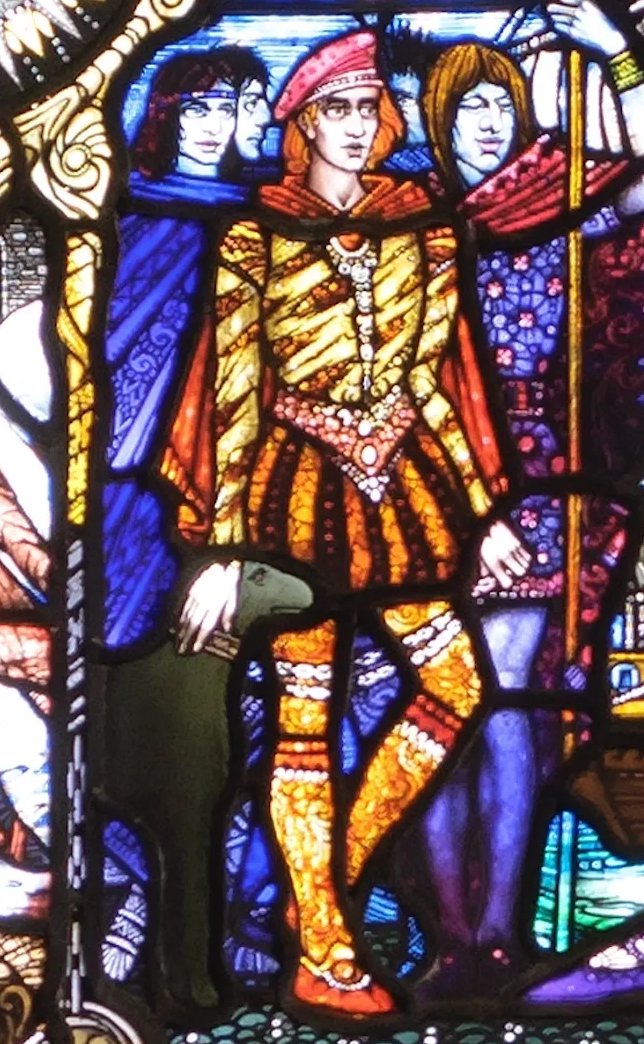
- 1934 depiction of O'Donnell by Richard King

Lord of Tyrconnell
- Reign: 23 April 1592 – 30 August 1602
- Inauguration: 23 April 1592
- Predecessor: Hugh McManus O'Donnell
- Successor: Disputed (see Succession)
- Born: c. 20 October 1572; Tyrconnell, Ireland
- Died: 30 August 1602 (aged 29); Castle of Simancas, Crown of Castile
- Burial: 1 September 1602; Convent of St. Francis, Valladolid
- Spouse: Rose O'Neill (m. 1592; div. 1597)
- Issue: None
- House: O'Donnell dynasty
- Father: Hugh McManus O'Donnell
- Mother: Iníon Dubh
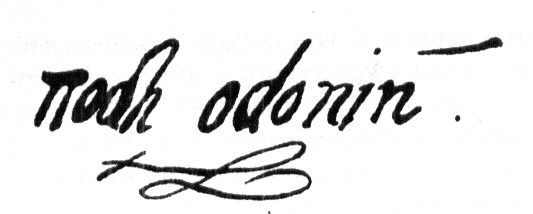
- Signature

Hugh Roe O'Donnell II (Note: His great-grandfather, also named Hugh Roe O'Donnell, was clan chief from 1461 to 1505; historian Francis Martin O'Donnell thus distinguishes them using regnal numbers I and II.) (Irish: Aodh Ruadh Ó Domhnaill; c. 20 October 1572 – 30 August 1602), (Note: [N.S. c. 30 October 1572 – 9 September 1602]) (Note: Unless otherwise stated, all dates before 1752 are given in the Julian calendar, which was used in the Kingdom of Ireland throughout O'Donnell's lifetime.) also known as Red Hugh O'Donnell, was an Irish clan chief and leader of the confederacy of Irish lords during the Nine Years' War (1593–1603).

He was born into the powerful O'Donnell clan of Tyrconnell (present-day County Donegal). By the age of fourteen, he was recognised as his clan's tanist (heir) and engaged to the daughter of prominent lord Hugh O'Neill, Earl of Tyrone. The English-led Irish government feared this alliance would threaten their control over Ulster, so Lord Deputy John Perrot had O'Donnell kidnapped by wine merchants at Rathmullan in 1587. After four years' imprisonment in Dublin Castle, O'Donnell escaped in December 1591 with the help of Tyrone's bribery, and was subsequently inaugurated as clan chief at Kilmacrennan on 23 April 1592.

Along with his father-in-law Tyrone, O'Donnell led a confederacy of Irish lords during the Nine Years' War, motivated to prevent English incursions into their territory and to end Catholic persecution under Queen Elizabeth I. Throughout the war, O'Donnell expanded his territory into Connacht by launching raids against successive Lord Presidents Richard Bingham and Conyers Clifford. O'Donnell led the confederacy to victory at the Battle of Curlew Pass. In 1600, he suffered various military and personal losses. His cousin Niall Garbh defected to the English, which greatly emboldened commander Henry Docwra's troops and forced O'Donnell out of Tyrconnell.

After a crushing defeat at the Siege of Kinsale, O'Donnell travelled to Habsburg Spain to acquire reinforcements from King Philip III. The promised reinforcements were continually postponed, and whilst preparing for a follow-up meeting with the king, O'Donnell died of a sudden illness at the Castle of Simancas, aged 29. His body was buried inside the Chapel of Wonders at the Convent of St. Francis in Valladolid. O'Donnell's premature death disheartened an already withering Irish resistance; Tyrone ended the Nine Years' War in 1603 with the Treaty of Mellifont.

Fiercely anti-English and militarily aggressive, O'Donnell is considered a folk hero and a symbol of Irish nationalism. He has drawn comparisons to El Cid and William Wallace. In 2020, an unsuccessful archaeological dig for his remains drew international media attention. Since 2022, Valladolid has annually reenacted his 1602 funeral procession in period costumes.

== Early life ==
=== Family background ===
Hugh Roe O'Donnell was born c. 20 October 1572, (Note: His biographer Lughaidh Ó Cléirigh does not give an exact birthdate, but notes Hugh Roe O'Donnell was less than fifteen years old when he was kidnapped shortly before 25 September 1587. Ó Cléirigh also stated he was under thirty when he died. The Short Annals of Tirconaill state O'Donnell was 29 years old when he set out for Kinsale on 19 October [N.S. 29 October] 1601. Paul Walsh argues O'Donnell was thus born towards the end of October 1572, per New Style dating. John J. Silke estimates that O'Donnell was born on or about 20 October.) the eldest son of Irish lord Hugh McManus O'Donnell and his second wife, Scottish aristocrat Fiona "Iníon Dubh" MacDonald. He was born into the ruling branch of the O'Donnell clan, a Gaelic Irish noble dynasty based in Tyrconnell, a kingdom geographically associated with present-day County Donegal. He had three younger brothers, Rory, Manus and Caffar (in order of age), and several sisters, Nuala, Margaret and Mary. He also had older half-siblings from his father's previous relationships, including Donal and Siobhán.

Paternally O'Donnell claimed descent, via the lineage of Conall Gulban of the Cenél Conaill, from the semi-legendary High King Niall of the Nine Hostages. Through his mother, O'Donnell was a descendant of the first six Scottish Chiefs of Clan MacDonald of Dunnyveg; and from Somerled, the first Lord of the Isles. He was also descended from King of Scots Robert the Bruce and his grandson Robert II, the first Stuart king of Scotland.

Family tree of Hugh Roe O'Donnell and selected relatives

Hugh Dubh; O'Donnell d. 1537
Manus; O'Donnell; 1490–1563	Hugh; McHugh Dubh; O'Donnell c. 1537–1618
Calvagh; O'Donnell c. 1515–1566
Hugh; McManus; O'Donnell c. 1520–1600	Fiona "Iníon Dubh"; MacDonald	Hugh; MacEdegany d. 1588 illegitimate	Conn; O'Donnell d. 1583
Donal; O'Donnell d. 1590	Hugh Roe; O'Donnell; 1572–1602	Nuala; O'Donnell c. 1575–c. 1630	Niall Garbh; O'Donnell c. 1569–1626

Legend

XXX	Subject of the article	XXX	Lord of Tyrconnell	XXX	Succession; Challenger	XXX	Foster-father of Hugh Roe

Hugh Roe O'Donnell's father, Hugh McManus, had ruled as clan chief and Lord of Tyrconnell since 1566. In 1569, Hugh McManus married Iníon Dubh of Clan MacDonald of Dunnyveg, as part of a marriage alliance which gave the O'Donnell clan access to the formidable Scottish mercenary forces known as Redshanks. Iníon Dubh pushed the O'Donnell clan further into opposition with the English, and in 1574 the clan established an alliance with the ascendant O'Neill clansman Hugh O'Neill (future Earl of Tyrone) through his marriage to Siobhán.

=== Education and fosterage ===
The Franciscan friars at Donegal Abbey were the spiritual counselors of the ruling O'Donnells, and were also the educators of the dynasty's children. In medieval Ireland, the sons of Irish clan chiefs were typically trained from the age of seven in horse-riding and weaponry.

Children of the Gaelic Irish nobility were traditionally fostered to fellow clans in the hopes of developing political alliances. Hugh Roe O'Donnell was fostered by four families of differing political alignments: Clans Sweeney na dTuath and O'Cahan, as well as two rival O'Donnell branches led by Hugh McHugh Dubh O'Donnell and Conn O'Donnell. (Note: It is also possible O'Donnell was fostered by his father's advisor Eoin O'Gallagher.) Conn's father Calvagh was a prior ruler of Tyrconnell, and Hugh Roe was removed from his care when he turned against Hugh McManus in 1581. Conn died two years later and Hugh Roe's succession seemed assured. Nevertheless, Conn's sons, particularly Niall Garbh, looked to the English government as a means of restoring their branch of the family to power. By 1587, Hugh Roe was in the care of Owen Óg MacSweeney na dTuath, his final foster-father, who gave him much independence. Ultimately Hugh Roe's fosterage did not engender much loyalty in his foster-families. Hugh McHugh Dubh antagonised the ruling O'Donnells into the 1590s, and the sons of MacSweeney na dTuath and Conn eventually opposed Hugh Roe by defecting to the English.

=== Rise to prominence ===
O'Donnell saw his first military action in 1584 along with his father's chief advisor Eoin O'Gallagher against Clan O'Rourke of West Breifne. Even before reaching the age of fifteen, O'Donnell had become well known across Ireland. Some of his contemporaries came to associate him with Aodh Eangach, a prophesised high king. It was foretold that if two men named Hugh succeeded each other as O'Donnell chief, the last Hugh shall "be a monarch in Ireland and quite banish thence all foreign nations and conquerors".

By 1587, O'Donnell was betrothed to the Earl of Tyrone's daughter Rose. In addition to Tyrone's earlier marriage to Siobhán, this betrothal further cemented a growing alliance between two clans who had been mortal enemies for centuries. As tanist (heir) of the O'Donnell clan, Hugh Roe O'Donnell was widely considered to be his father's most likely successor. Tyrone described him as "the stay that his father had for the quieting of his inhabitance".

== Imprisonment and escape ==
=== Capture at Rathmullan ===
The English government feared the emergence of a powerful O'Neill-O'Donnell alliance, cemented by O'Donnell's marriage to Rose, that would threaten English control over Ulster. Though Tyrone professed loyalty to the Crown, he was attracting suspicion from the government due to his growing power. O'Donnell's father had also failed to pay his promised annual rents, and hostages were often kept for policy reasons. Ultimately the government decided that O'Donnell must not be allowed to succeed as clan chief. (Note: Hugh McHugh Dubh was a prominent contender for clan chief, and the government suggested him as a preferred successor.) In May 1587, Lord Deputy John Perrot proposed to Lord Burghley that he could capture O'Donnell or his parents by sending a boat with wines.

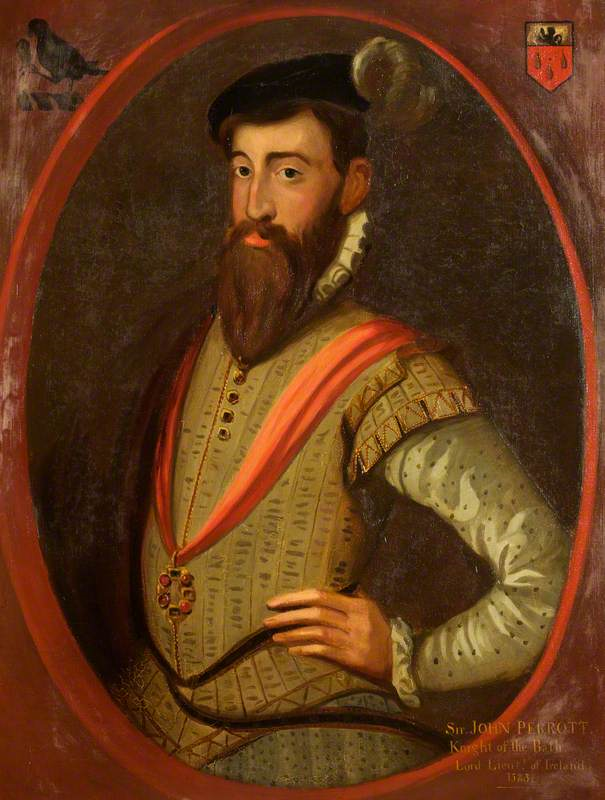
Lord Deputy John Perrot authorised O'Donnell's kidnapping.

In September, Hugh McManus was summoned to a conference with Perrot. Meanwhile the ship Matthew, captained by Dublin merchant Nicholas Barnes, was dispatched to Rathmullan on Lough Swilly, where fourteen-year-old Hugh Roe O'Donnell was sojourning with his foster-father MacSweeney na dTuath. (Note: MacSweeney na dTuath was Hugh Roe's foster-father, but Rathmullan was the stronghold of Clan MacSweeney Fanad, a related but distinct branch of Clan MacSweeney.) The ship was anchored and the crew went on shore under the guise of ordinary merchants selling wine. O'Donnell heard of the merchant ship and arrived with several young companions. Barnes claimed he had no wine left unsold except for what was left on the ship, and invited O'Donnell aboard. Chief Donnell MacSweeney Fanad (O'Donnell's host) was ashamed the young noble had missed out on the wine and unwittingly encouraged him to take a small boat to the Matthew.

Chief MacSweeney Fanad, Chief MacSweeney na dTuath and Eoin O'Gallagher accompanied O'Donnell onto the Matthew. Once on board, O'Donnell and his compatriots were conducted into a secured cabin and plied with food and wine. Whilst they were enjoying themselves, the hatches were fastened and their weapons were removed. MacSweeney Fanad, MacSweeney na dTuath and O'Gallagher were released, each in exchange for giving a young family member as a hostage. (Note: Philip O'Sullivan Beare stated Chief MacSweeney Fanad, Chief MacSweeney na dTuath and Eoin O'Gallagher accompanied Hugh Roe onto the Matthew, and were later exchanged for younger hostages once captured. Lughaidh Ó Cléirigh described Hugh Roe's boarding party as "thoughtless forward persons who were with him though they were older in years". Once Perrot arrived in Dublin, he reported he had captured three boys in addition to Hugh Roe: the eldest sons of MacSweeneys na dTuath and Fanad and "the best pledge upon the [O'Gallaghers]". In August 1588, "O'Donnell's four pledges" were recorded imprisoned in Dublin Castle: Hugh Roe, Donnell Gorm, Owny O'Gallagher and Owen MacSweeney. O'Sullivan Beare, writing in 1621, says MacSweeney Fanad gave his eldest son Donnell Gorm MacSweeney Fanad, O'Gallagher gave his nephew Hugh O'Gallagher, and MacSweeney na dTuath gave "his eldest son" (purportedly a peasant dressed in his son's clothes, who was later dismissed by the Lord Deputy). The Annals of Loch Cé (completed in 1590) mention the kidnapping of MacSweeney Fanad's son and Hugh Roe, as well as O'Gallagher's son (not his nephew). MacSweeney na dTuath's son is not mentioned.) Hostages were offered in O'Donnell's stead to no avail.

=== Imprisonment ===
O'Donnell arrived in Dublin on 25 September; Queen Elizabeth I was informed the next day. The four hostages were imprisoned in Dublin Castle, most likely in one of the gate towers. Within three months, Tyrone was lobbying the Queen for O'Donnell's release. In 1588, he offered a bribe of £1000 to William FitzWilliam, Perrot's successor as Lord Deputy, plus £300 to newly-appointed officials. Tyrone was later accused of offering a further £1000 to Dublin Castle's constable. In spring 1588, Iníon Dubh offered Perrot a bribe of £2000 plus sureties and hostages for her son's release. After the Spanish Armada's September 1588 shipwreck in Inishowen, Hugh McManus unsuccessfully offered the government thirty captured Spanish officers in exchange for his son. In 1590, FitzWilliam indicated a willingness to release O'Donnell, but this came to naught.

"It was anguish and sickness of mind and great pain to [O'Donnell] to be as he was, and it was not on his own account but because of the great helplessness in which his [kinsmen and subjects] were, owing to their expulsion and banishment to other territories throughout Erin. He was always meditating and searching how to find a way of escape."

— Lughaidh Ó Cléirigh on Hugh Roe O'Donnell's imprisonment

During his time in Dublin Castle, O'Donnell had little interaction with the outside world beyond conversations with fellow political prisoners, particularly the Anglo-Irish Munster lords imprisoned during the Desmond Rebellions. Witnessing first-hand the brutality inflicted by the Dublin government on Irish rebels, he became embittered and distrustful of English authority. Ironically, O'Donnell learnt English during his imprisonment, though commissioners reported in March 1593 he "could hardly speak it". This period in Dublin is seen as the defining event of his short life.

O'Donnell's imprisonment, coupled with his father's premature senility, exacerbated a long-running succession dispute which had consumed Tyrconnell since October 1580. Iníon Dubh effectively took over Tyrconnell and ruled in her husband's name, pushing for O'Donnell's succession by spreading the Aodh Eangach prophecy. On her orders, her redshanks killed challengers Hugh MacEdegany and Donal O'Donnell in 1588 and 1590 respectively. She also bought off Niall Garbh with a political marriage to her daughter Nuala in an effort to temper his hostility. Further disruptions developed as the government appointed various administrators who pillaged Tyrconnell, such as William Mostian, John Connill and Humphrey Willis. In 1594, O'Donnell estimated Tyrconnell had suffered £20,000 worth of damages (equivalent to £5,500,000 in May 2025). This chaos created mass resentment towards the English government, even from the typically pro-English portion of the population.

=== First escape attempt ===
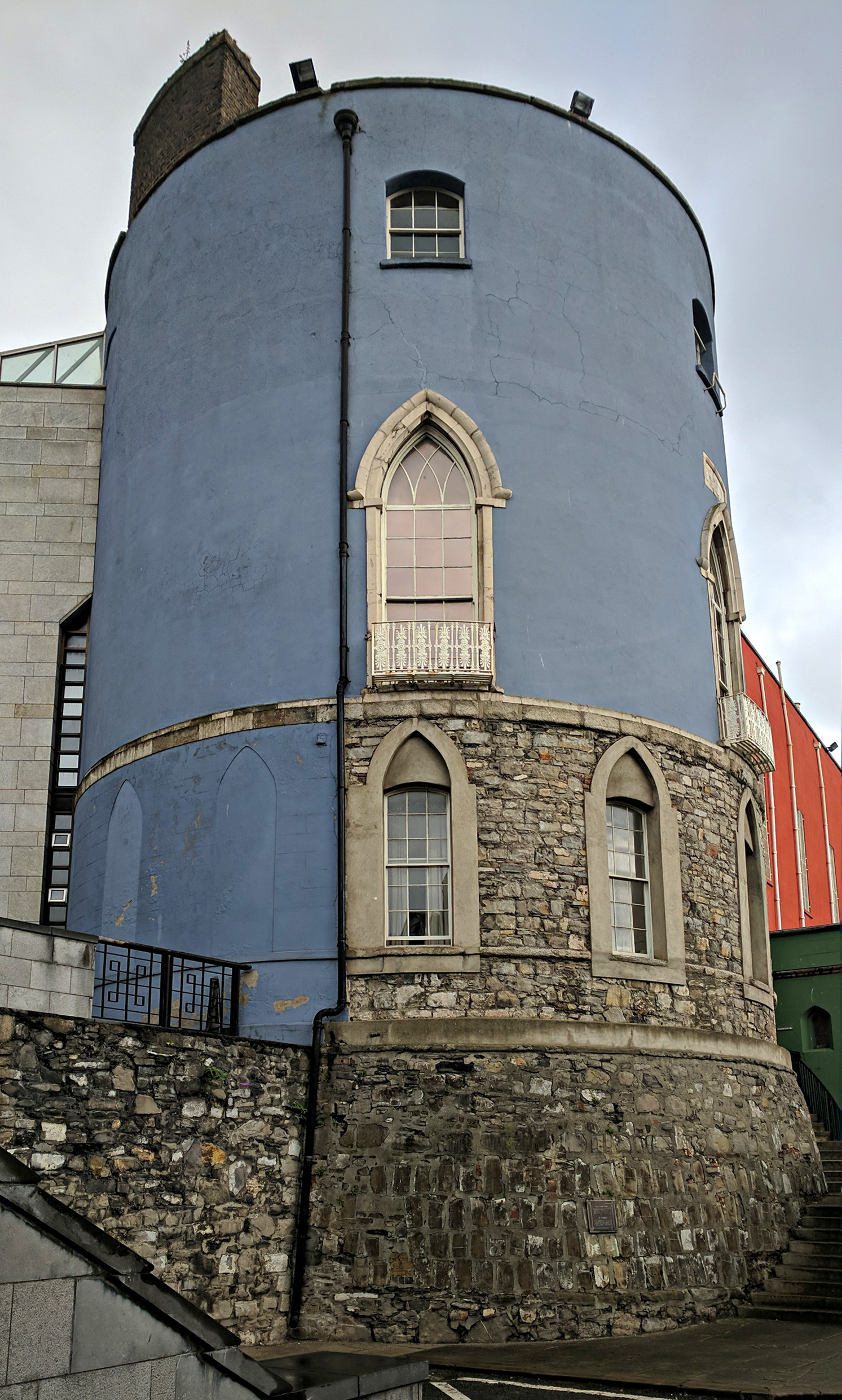
O'Donnell was imprisoned in Dublin Castle's Bermingham Tower.

O'Donnell made his first escape attempt in January 1591 with a number of companions. (Note: O'Sullivan Beare mistakenly says Hugh Roe escaped with MacSweeney Fanad's son and O'Gallagher's pledge. These prisoners had already escaped in 1589 and left Hugh Roe behind.) It is possible the escape was incentivised by news of Donal's rebellion. Before O'Donnell and his companions were put in their cells one night, they escaped through a nearby window and climbed down a rope onto the drawbridge. They jammed a block of timber into the door, preventing the guards from pursuing them. By the time the guards noticed O'Donnell's absence and gave chase, the fugitives had already escaped past the open city gates.

O'Donnell's shoes fell apart and he was left behind by his companions in the thick woods beyond Three Rock Mountain. He sent word to Castlekevin in County Wicklow, the territory of Chief Felim O'Toole, who had visited him in Dublin Castle. O'Toole wanted to assist O'Donnell but faced pressure from his clan, who feared the consequences of aiding a high profile fugitive. O'Toole's sister Rose quickly planned for her husband Fiach McHugh O'Byrne, Chief of Clan O'Byrne, to take O'Donnell to his house in Glenmalure. According to Philip O'Sullivan Beare, O'Byrne and his clansmen immediately set out to rescue O'Donnell, but their inability to cross a flooded river prevented them from reaching Castlekevin in time. English officer George Carew was dispatched to Castlekevin on 15 January and O'Donnell was surrendered and returned to Dublin Castle in chains. O'Donnell was lodged in Dublin Castle's record tower (the Bermingham Tower), shackled more heavily than before, and checked by the chief gaoler twice a day.

=== Second escape attempt ===
In late December 1591, (Note: Lughaidh Ó Cléirigh states the successful escape occurred on the eve of the Epiphany (6 January) in 1592, which would be 5 January. O'Sullivan Beare stated it occurred a few days before Christmas 1591 (25 December), which is a difference in time of about a fortnight. The Annals of the Four Masters, compiled in the 1630s and partially adapted from Ó Cléirigh's biography, states Hugh Roe remained in Dublin till the winter of 1592. Silke, O'Byrne, McGettigan, McCormack and Clavin conclude the escape occurred in January 1592, which corresponds to late December in Old Style dating. Morgan corroborates this with his statement that the escape occurred at Christmas time in 1591, Old Style.) O'Donnell made a successful escape attempt with his fellow prisoners Henry MacShane O'Neill and Art MacShane O'Neill. After years of lobbying and bribery, Tyrone had finally succeeded in bribing officials to help facilitate O'Donnell's escape. The highly corrupt FitzWilliam was most likely the recipient of this bribe, though this has never been conclusively proven. In summer 1590, Conn MacShane O'Neill alleged Tyrone "did lay down a plot and practised the escape of Hugh Roe" from prison—the plot apparently involved a silk rope and prepared horses. This is obviously a reference to some previous attempt, but is an accurate forecast of O'Donnell's eventually successful escape.

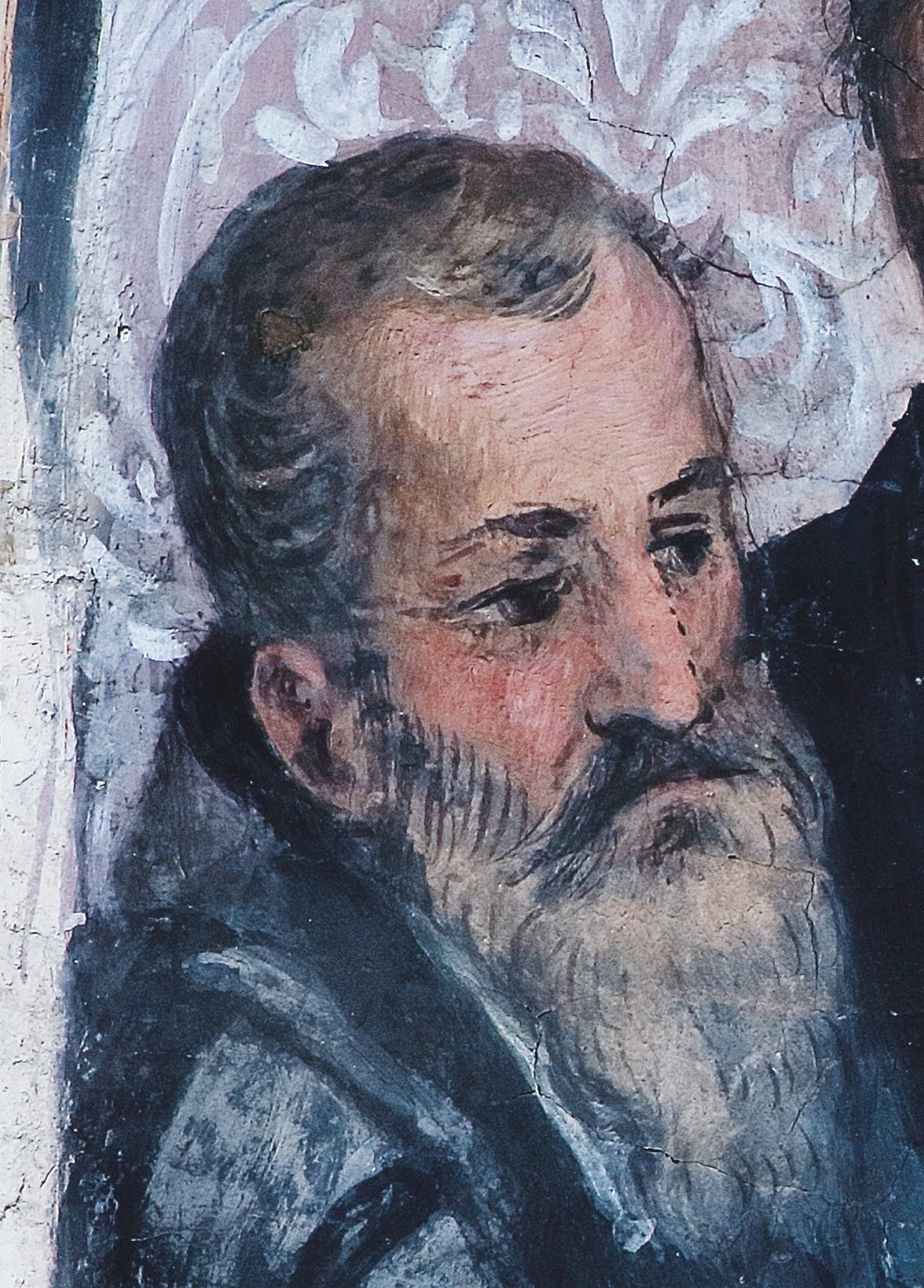
O'Donnell's father-in-law, Hugh O'Neill, Earl of Tyrone, bribed officials to ensure the successful prison escape.

In comparison to O'Donnell's first escape, which appeared to be entirely his own doing, considerable effort went into the preparation of the second escape plan. The constable of Dublin Castle John Maplesden was on his deathbed, which distracted the chief gaoler from his duties and made it the perfect time to mount an escape. O'Byrne promised shelter for the fugitives at Glenmalure. Edward Eustace, a gaoler's servant and stable boy who visited O'Donnell in the castle, was prepared to act as a guide. (Note: According to O'Sullivan Beare, Eustace promised four horses which would be saddled in a nearby stable for three days prior; however, on the day of the escape the horses were removed without his knowledge, necessitating an escape on foot.) Richard Weston, a servant of Tyrone, managed to supply O'Donnell with a silk rope, and winter clothes were acquired for the long journey.

When the three prisoners were unshackled to eat, they took advantage of the gaolers. (Note: Ó Cléirigh merely states that the prisoners "found an opportunity on the part of the guards". In contrast, O'Sullivan Beare claimed Hugh Roe himself "procured a file with which he cut the fastenings of his, Henry's and Art's chains".) The prisoners made their way to the privy house, tying one end of the rope there, and feeding the other end down the privy hole which led outside the castle. Intentionally or not, Henry became separated from the others. (Note: According to Ó Cléirigh, "the darkness of the night and the hurry of the flight separated [Henry] who was the oldest of the party... [The others] were not pleased at the separation". According to O'Sullivan Beare, Henry made his way down the rope first, and without waiting for the others, escaped safely back to Ulster. Hugh Roe followed, but Art MacShane was badly injured by a falling stone whilst sliding down the rope.) Once outside the castle, O'Donnell and Art MacShane met with Eustace who guided them through the dark Dublin streets. The trio mixed in with the crowds and safely escaped the city on foot.

In their hurry, the fugitives left their winter clothes in prison. O'Donnell's shoes became worn out, exposing him to the elements. Art MacShane had to be carried by the others, either because he had grown fat and unfit in prison, or possibly due to an injury from his fall through the privy hole. The trio made it into the Wicklow Mountains and sought shelter in a cave, said to be located along the slopes of Conavalla. O'Donnell and Art MacShane were too weak to reach Glenmalure, so Eustace left them in the cave and went on ahead to get help. According to O'Sullivan Beare, O'Donnell managed to survive for three nights by eating leaves, but despite his pleas, Art MacShane could not eat. When O'Byrne's men arrived to rescue them, O'Donnell and Art MacShane were near death. Art MacShane died of hypothermia and was buried on the mountainside. O'Donnell was taken to Glenmalure where he spent a few days recovering.

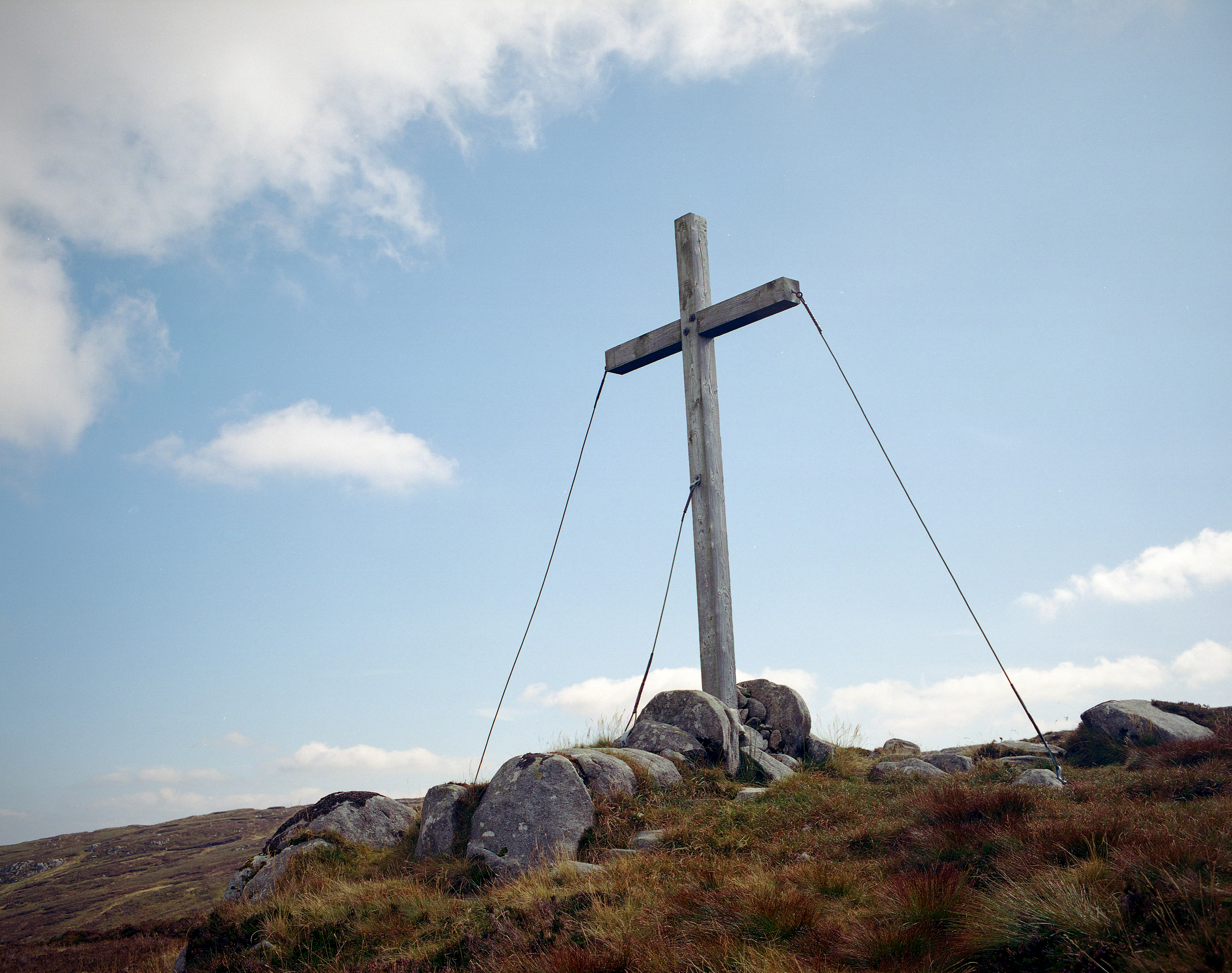
A cross marks the spot where Art MacShane O'Neill is said to have died

Unusually, the state papers do not mention either of O'Donnell's prison escapes until he had returned to Ulster in early 1592. This could point to corruption or embarrassment on the part of government officials. In a letter to Lord Burghley, FitzWilliam attempted to vindicate himself by declaring he had sacked Maplesden (who died "within a day or two" after the escape) and imprisoned the chief gaoler. Queen Elizabeth I wrote to statesman Thomas Burgh in May 1592, declaring that O'Donnell had escaped through bribery and requesting an investigation into the matter.

== Accession as clan chief ==
=== Return to Ulster ===
O'Donnell and O'Byrne swore mutual oaths to assist the other in rebellion, and the former promised to make Tyrone and Chief Hugh Maguire of Fermanagh swear similar oaths. Once Tyrone's emissary, Turlough Boye O'Hagan, arrived to escort O'Donnell back to Ulster, they set out immediately. O'Donnell's feet were frostbitten so he had to be lifted off and onto his horse. This journey took O'Donnell back through the Pale. He stayed one night in Mellifont at the house of Anglo-Irish ally Garret Moore, before reaching Tyrone's residence at Dungannon, where the two men presumably discussed their plans to retake Tyrconnell's lordship. It is also here they may have planned their future attack on Turlough Luineach O'Neill, Tyrone's rival in Tír Eoghain. O'Donnell remained at Tyrone's residence for four days, hidden in a secret chamber to avoid corrupting Tyrone's loyalist public image. Afterwards, O'Donnell was received by Maguire, who conveyed him to the border of Tyrconnell.

Not long before his return, Willis and Connill's forces occupied Donegal Abbey as a garrison. O'Donnell quickly rallied his family's followers to Ballyshannon Castle, one of his few major strongholds not dispossessed by the Crown. As soon as Chief Donough MacSweeney Banagh heard of O'Donnell's safe return, he attacked Willis, forcing him and his soldiers into Donegal Abbey. In February, O'Donnell expelled the English troops from Tyrconnell. (Note: Sources conflict on the circumstances. Both Ó Cléirigh and O'Sullivan Beare state O'Donnell allowed Willis and his men to leave in safety if they left behind their plunder. According to a 17th-century account written by Donegal clergy, Willis threatened to set the church on fire, but O'Donnell was "anxious to preserve the sacred edifice" and allowed Willis to depart unharmed. English Captain Thomas Lee states O'Donnell intended to slaughter Willis's men but was held back by Tyrone.) Subsequently his big toes were amputated by surgeons due to frostbite. He remained ill and in recovery for a year.

=== Inauguration ===
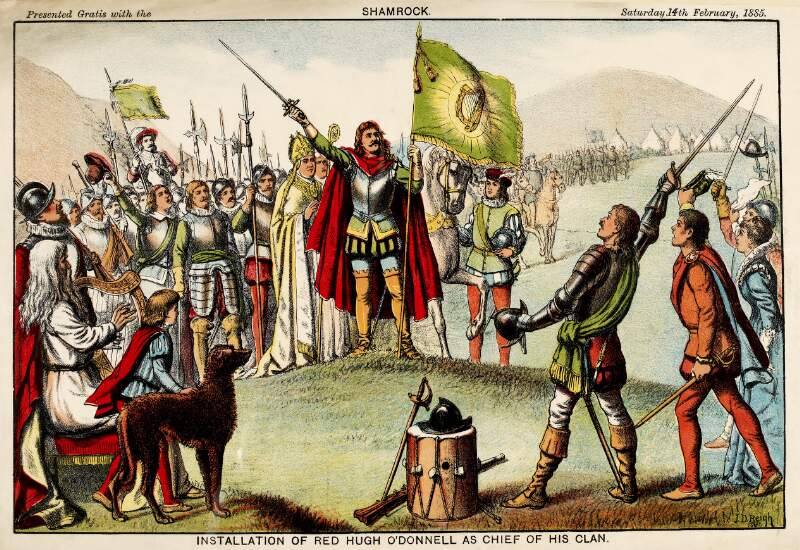
1885 illustration of O'Donnell's inauguration by John Dooley Reigh

On 23 April 1592 at Kilmacrennan Friary, 19-year-old O'Donnell was inaugurated as O'Donnell clan chief before an audience of his family and their supporters. The inauguration ceremony was part-religious and part-secular, (Note: For detail on the customs of the ceremony, see O'Clery, O'Clery & Murphy 1895, pp. xliii, 41–43 and Ó Canann 2007, pp. 101–116.) and involved the O'Donnell clan's ornamental inauguration stone. (Note: The inauguration stone ("Rock of Doon") was traditionally located at the Hill of Doon, though by 1592 it had been moved to Kilmacrennan.) Hugh McManus's apparently voluntary abdication was stage-managed by Iníon Dubh, who remained the "head of advice and counsel" in Tyrconnell. O'Donnell's younger brother Rory was appointed as tanist.

The major surviving opponents to O'Donnell's succession—including Niall Garbh, Hugh McHugh Dubh and Sean O'Doherty—did not attend the inauguration out of protest. At the time, Niall Garbh was in Dublin unsuccessfully seeking support from authorities. Historian Tomás G. Ó Canann notes that, as O'Donnell failed to secure the attendance of such a significant chunk of the Cenél Conaill, his inauguration was arguably illegitimate.

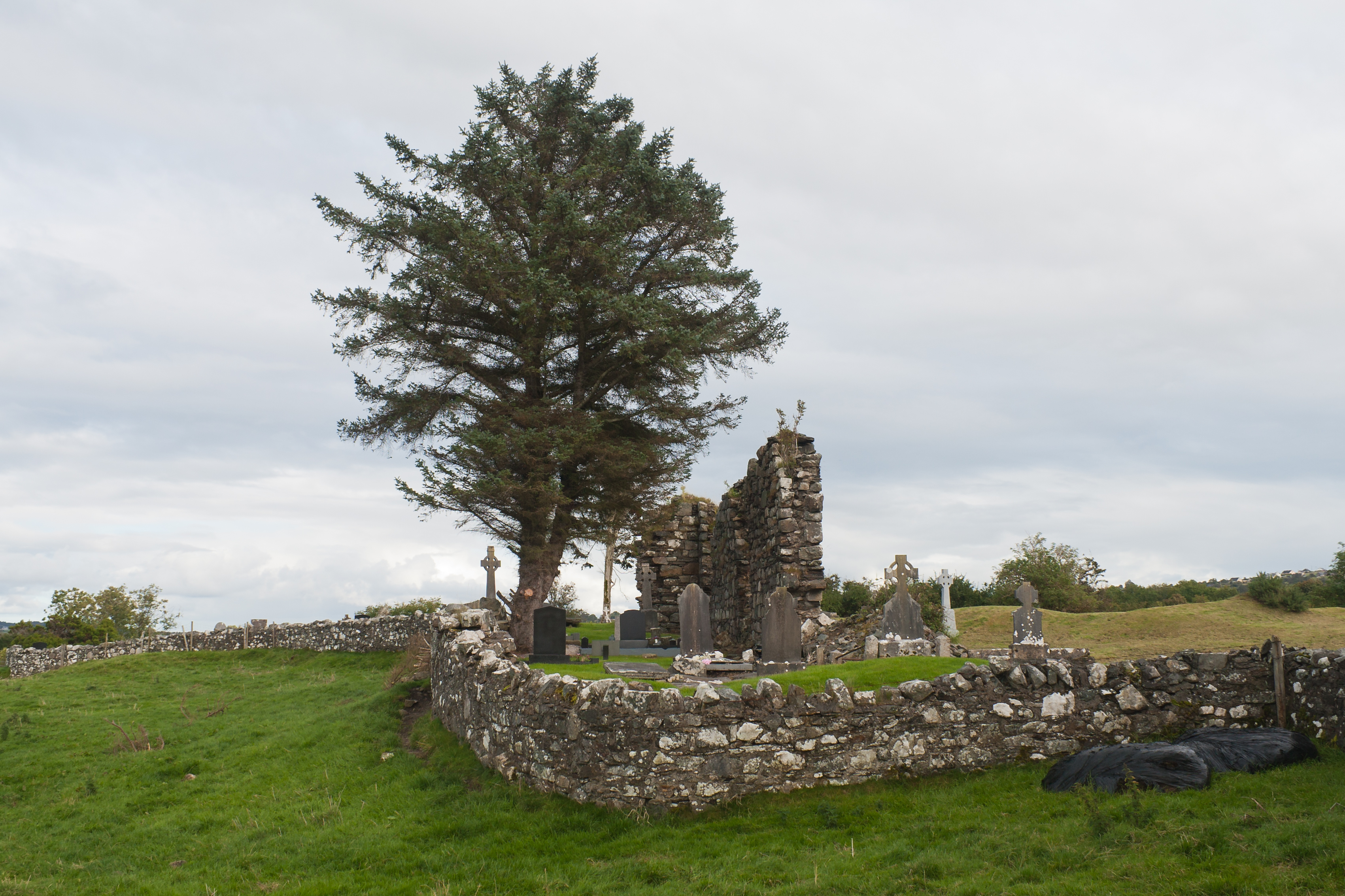
Kilmacrennan Friary in 2012, where O'Donnell was inaugurated.

=== Rise in power ===
Immediately after his inauguration, O'Donnell and Tyrone mounted raids against Turlough Luineach, who had provided assistance to O'Donnell's rivals such as Niall Garbh. O'Donnell desired revenge and sought to assist his new ally Tyrone, whose alliance with O'Donnell was primarily founded on using his military power to take control of Tír Eoghain. In June 1592, O'Donnell renewed his clan's interest in north Connacht by supporting a revolt among the lower MacWilliam Bourkes, to the chagrin of Lord President Richard Bingham. O'Donnell imposed his control over Tyrconnell. He dispelled bandits from Barnesmore Gap, established an execution site at Mullaghnashee beside Ballyshannon Castle, and took pledges from all nobles wealthy enough to maintain four horsemen.

After some convincing, O'Donnell accompanied Tyrone to Dundalk to submit to FitzWilliam. During their meeting, held in a church on 2 August 1592, Tyrone bribed FitzWilliam with a jewel worth £500 so O'Donnell could secure government recognition. O'Donnell made various agreements with FitzWilliam: he pledged his loyalty to Elizabeth I, agreed to receive a Sheriff in Tyrconnell, promised to pay his father's covenanted rents, to treat his rivals (O'Doherty, Niall Garbh and Hugh McHugh Dubh) fairly, to banish Catholic clergy from Tyrconnell, and to avoid supporting the MacWilliam Bourkes in Connacht. O'Donnell negotiated to retain about 100 redshanks in Tyrconnell for use as his mother's bodyguards. After the meeting, the two Hughs feasted at Dungannon where they further discussed their developing alliance.

Tyrone's daughter Rose was escorted to Tyrconnell in expectation of her marriage to O'Donnell. The historian Morwenna Donnelly suggests that Tyrone was putting pressure on O'Donnell to complete their clans' alliance. The couple were formally married during Christmas-time 1592 at O'Donnell's house. The marriage started out as a success with Rose having some measure of influence over O'Donnell.

Despite his promises to FitzWilliam, O'Donnell subjugated his rivals. Sean O'Doherty was captured at a parley and imprisoned; only then did he acknowledge O'Donnell's lordship. In early 1593, O'Donnell obtained Hugh McHugh Dubh's submission by taking his last stronghold at Belleek and beheading sixteen of his followers by pretending to sign a treaty of friendship. This sufficiently intimidated Niall Garbh and he submitted to his younger cousin. He was forced to turn over control of Lifford's castle, though his ambitions to seize the lordship remained. With the Tyrone-O'Donnell alliance against him, Turlough Luineach surrendered his lordship in May 1593. Tyrone took control of Tír Eoghain, making both O'Donnell and his father-in-law the rulers of Gaelic Ulster's two major kingdoms.

== Initial rebellion ==
=== Conference of bishops ===
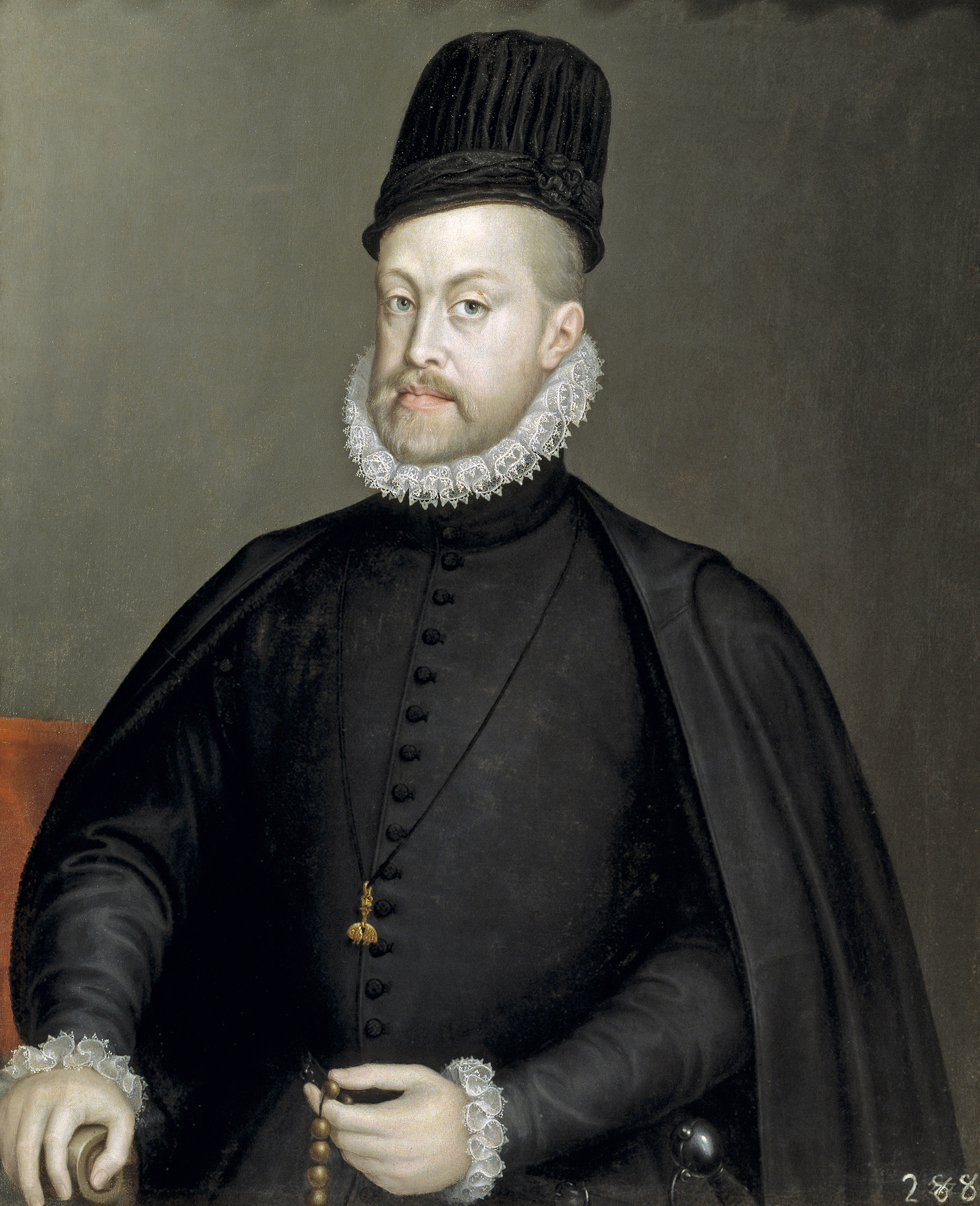
O'Donnell sought military aid from King Philip II of Spain.

By late 1592 the Crown's continual advances into Ireland, as well as the recent executions of chieftains Hugh Roe MacMahon in 1590 and Brian O'Rourke in 1591 had created a fierce resentment in the Gaelic nobility and Irish Catholic clergy. Catholic priests were suffering harassment and imprisonment from English authorities, and Spain had been a refuge to the Irish Catholic clergy since the 1570s. Archbishop Edmund MacGauran returned from Spain with promises from King Philip II to support oppressed Irish Catholics if they proved themselves by launching prior military action. In December, a conference of seven northern bishops met in Tyrconnell. O'Donnell pledged his support to the Irish Catholic cause, and as a leading force of the emerging confederacy he began to work with MacGauran to secure Spanish support. On 29 March 1593, O'Donnell wrote to Irish nobles living in Spain, saying they could not hold out for long against the Crown without Philip II's backing.

=== Maguire's revolt ===
Humphrey Willis was appointed by FitzWilliam as Sheriff of Fermanagh against Maguire's will. In early April 1593, Willis entered Fermanagh with at least 100 men and began violently raiding. This exacerbated resentment towards the Crown, and after Willis' first offensive, O'Donnell met with MacGauran, Maguire, Brian Oge O'Rourke and Theobald, Richard and John Bourke at Enniskillen Castle on 28 April. MacGauran advised the noblemen to sign a letter to Philip II which emphasised their oppression and requested urgent reinforcements from the Spanish army. The Archbishop of Tuam, James O'Hely, was tasked with delivering the confederates' messages: two letters from O'Donnell, one letter from MacGauran, and the 28 April letter signed by the confederates. (Note: The other signatories of the 28 April letter were clergymen Redmond O'Gallagher (Bishop of Derry), Richard Brady (Bishop of Kilmore), Cornelius O'Devany (Bishop of Down and Connor), Patrick MacCaul (Bishop of Dromore) and Niall O'Boyle (Bishop of Raphoe).) Maguire obtained reinforcements from Tyrone's brother and foster-brothers, who were likely involved on Tyrone's behalf, and forced Willis and his men from Fermanagh. Maguire's revolt marked the start of the Nine Years' War.

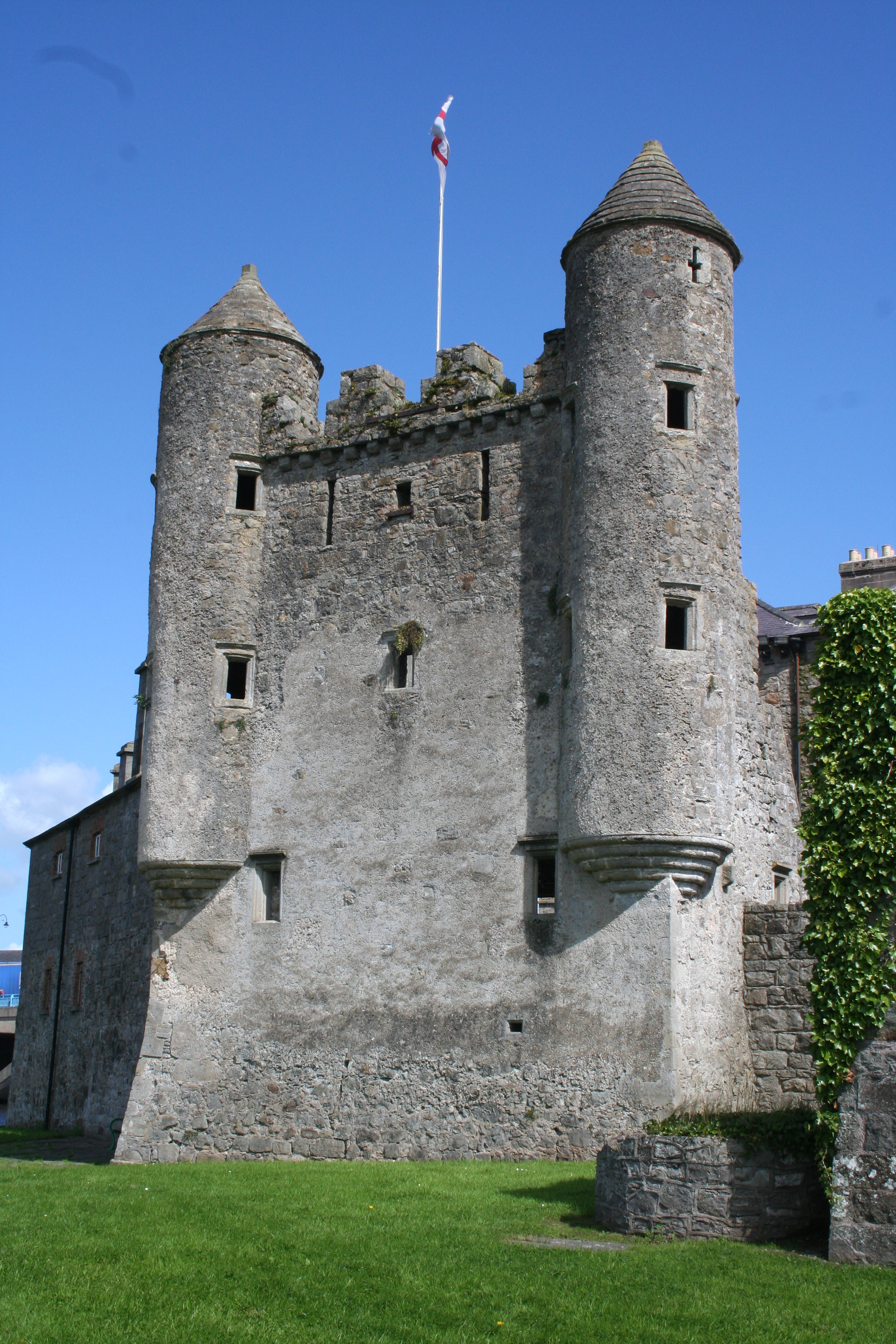
The Irish confederacy formed following a meeting at Hugh Maguire's stronghold, Enniskillen Castle.

Historians have debated O'Donnell's position within the confederacy. (Note: Hiram Morgan and Darren McGettigan notably have polarising viewpoints on O'Donnell's role. See McGinty 2013 for further discussion of O'Donnell's relationship with his father-in-law.) Historians Nicholas Canny, Michael Finnegan, John J. Silke and Darren McGettigan credit O'Donnell as the confederacy's driving force until Tyrone's break into open rebellion. Historians Hiram Morgan and James O'Neill have disputed this by emphasising that Tyrone was a more important figure who hid his allegiance to the confederacy for strategic reasons. The Sheriff of Monaghan alleged Tyrone had attended the meeting at Enniskillen Castle, though Tyrone did not sign MacGauran's letter. Around August 1593, Maguire stated to a spy that Tyrone had pushed him into rebellion and "promised to assist him and bear him out in his war". Many of Tyrone's British contemporaries, such as Perrot and Geoffrey Fenton, considered O'Donnell to be the junior partner in the confederacy. O'Hely reached the Spanish court by September 1593, where he met with royal secretary Juan de Idiáquez. In Idiáquez's notes to Philip II, he notes the early confederates wanted Tyrone to join them in open rebellion, though it appears Tyrone refused to publicly defy the Crown without reassurances on the arrival of Spanish reinforcements.

=== Secret rebellion ===
Catholic bishops spread the Aodh Eangach prophecy to advance the Irish rebellion. Maguire and O'Rourke continued to rebel by attacking English forces. O'Donnell aided the growing rebellion by sending MacSweeney gallowglass, but publicly he feigned neutrality. He lacked sufficient forces to combat a direct assault from English forces; he also faced pressure from his father-in-law to likewise appear publicly loyal to the Crown. O'Donnell used the chiefdoms of Maguire and O'Rourke as a buffer against Bingham's forces. He also advised Maguire and sheltered his creaghts on Tyrconnell's borders. MacGauran was killed on 23 June 1593 whilst accompanying Maguire on a raid. In September, O'Donnell sent his mother to Scotland to secure further Scottish troops.

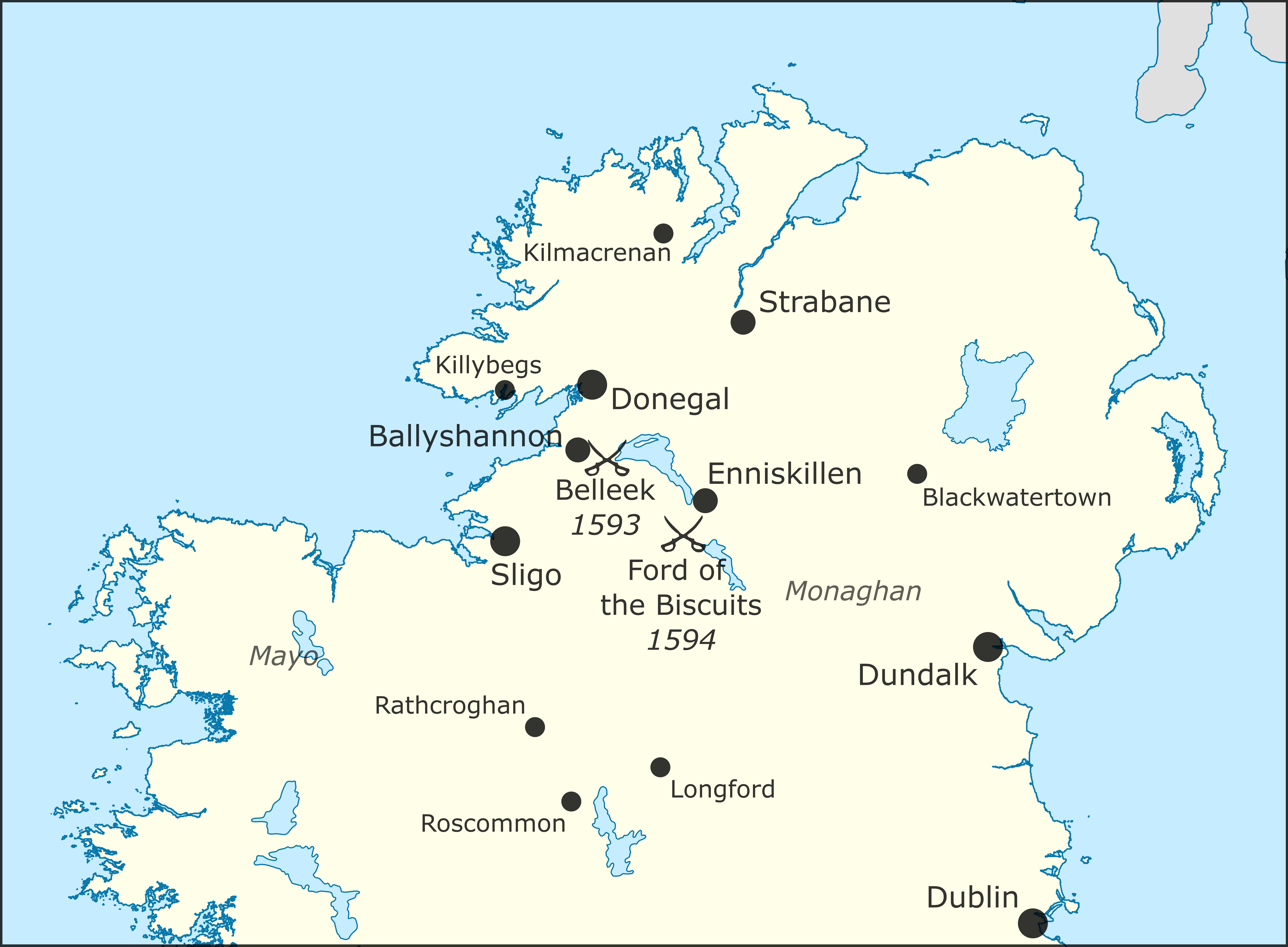
Map of Ireland, with points of interest related to Hugh Roe O'Donnell

Maguire's rebellious activity provoked a large-scale military expedition led by Marshal Henry Bagenal which culminated at the Battle of Belleek in October. Tyrone fought on Bagenal's side ostensibly to prove his loyalty to the Crown. O'Donnell was in nearby Ballyshannon when the battle was taking place, but he was ordered by Tyrone not to reinforce Maguire. The battle was a ploy to make the confederacy seem weaker than it actually was, thus diverting English attention away from Ireland. O'Donnell partially disobeyed Tyrone's order and sent 60 horsemen, 60 swordsmen and 100 gallowglass under the command of Niall Garbh. Historian James O'Neill argues O'Donnell intentionally dispatched the antagonistic Niall Garbh to Belleek hoping he would die in the slaughter. Bagenal's forces won the battle. Despite the successful ploy, the battle was damaging to O'Donnell. Many of the gallowglass were killed and Niall Garbh survived. To placate the Crown's victorious army, O'Donnell sent 115 cattle to the English camp as a gift.

A letter from O'Donnell was later found on the corpse of a Redshank captain killed in the battle. By November 1593, Bingham was aware O'Donnell was secretly assisting Maguire and O'Rourke. The Crown demanded Tyrone bring O'Donnell under control, and in March 1594, the two men met with government commissioners near Dundalk. O'Donnell professed "his ancestors had always been loyal to her majesty, and so he would continue but stood in danger of his life and feared practices would be used against him". Tyrone submitted a list of his and O'Donnell's grievances, but the talks ended in confusion when O'Donnell threatened to kill some of Tyrone's English friends. Afterwards government commissioners surmised a confederacy had been established between the Ulster lords. In March 1594, Philip II sent a Spanish ship—containing O'Hely, Spanish experts and Irish émigrés—to Ireland on a reconnaissance mission, but the crew died when it was shipwrecked off the coast of Santander.

=== Open rebellion ===
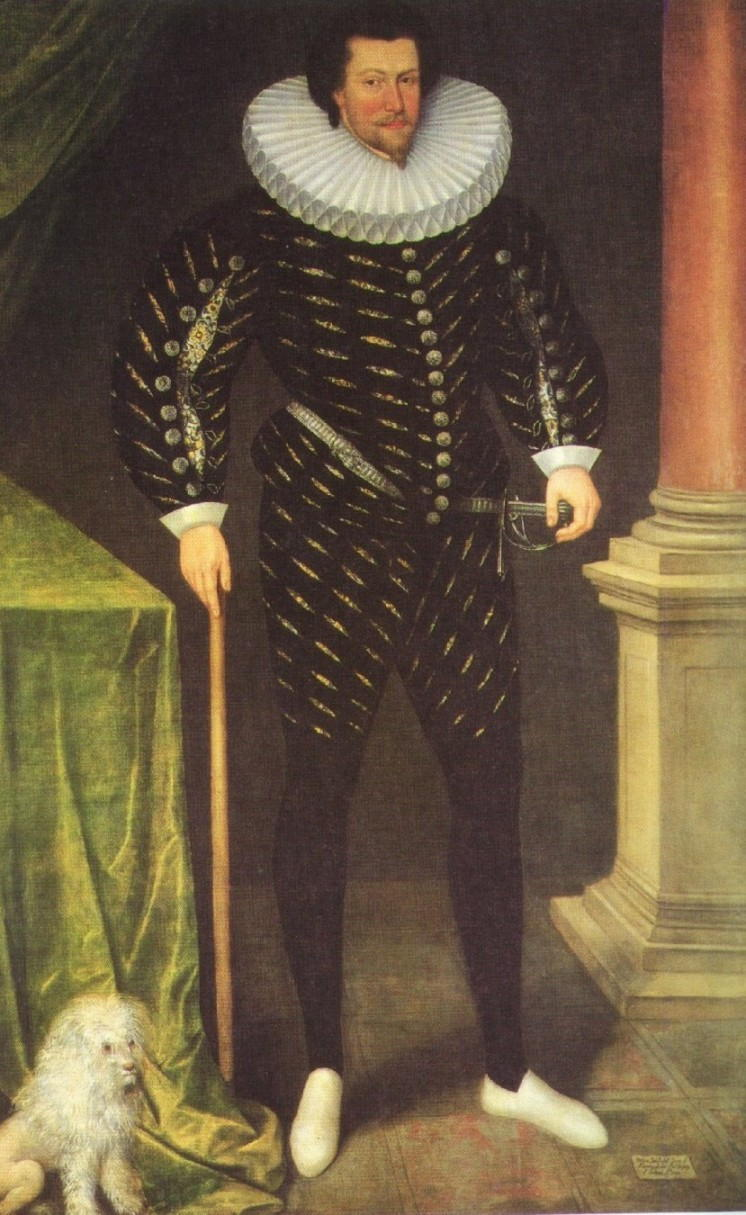
William Russell served as Lord Deputy from 1594 to 1597.

O'Donnell was aware Tyrconnell would become an easy target if Maguire and O'Rourke's territories were occupied by the English. In February 1594, he demolished castles in Belleek and Bundrowes to prevent English forces from taking them, and he concentrated his forces at Ballyshannon on his mother's advice. That same month, Captain John Dowdall captured Enniskillen Castle, Maguire's stronghold, after a nine-day siege. O'Donnell rushed to Maguire's aid, assembling an army and joining Maguire to retake the castle. He stated he "would not leave that siege until he had eaten the last cow in his country". The castle was blockaded by 11 June, and by late July the English soldiers were suffering from food shortages. O'Donnell's decision to join the siege of Enniskillen brought his rebellion into the open.

O'Donnell encountered resistance from his family, with both his brother Rory and his father Hugh McManus opposing his choice to go to war. Frustrated with Tyrone's loyalist facade, O'Donnell warned him that "he must consider Tyrone his enemy, unless he came to his aid in such a pinch". Tyrone subsequently sent reinforcements under his brother Cormac MacBaron O'Neill to the Battle of the Ford of the Biscuits. O'Donnell continued to negotiate through his father-in-law; in August, Tyrone presented the new Lord Deputy, William Russell, with a lengthy document of O'Donnell's grievances and demands. O'Donnell requested a general pardon for himself and his followers, as well as clemency for Maguire, O'Rourke and rebels in County Monaghan. Russell ignored these demands and resupplied Enniskillen castle with 1,200 Irish Army soldiers, comprising most of the troops at his disposal. The English relief mission was successful but ominously peaceful—Russell lost communication with his spies as they had all been captured by confederate soldiers. By early 1595, Tyrone had finally joined O'Donnell in open rebellion with an assault on the Blackwater Fort.

=== Expansion into Connacht ===
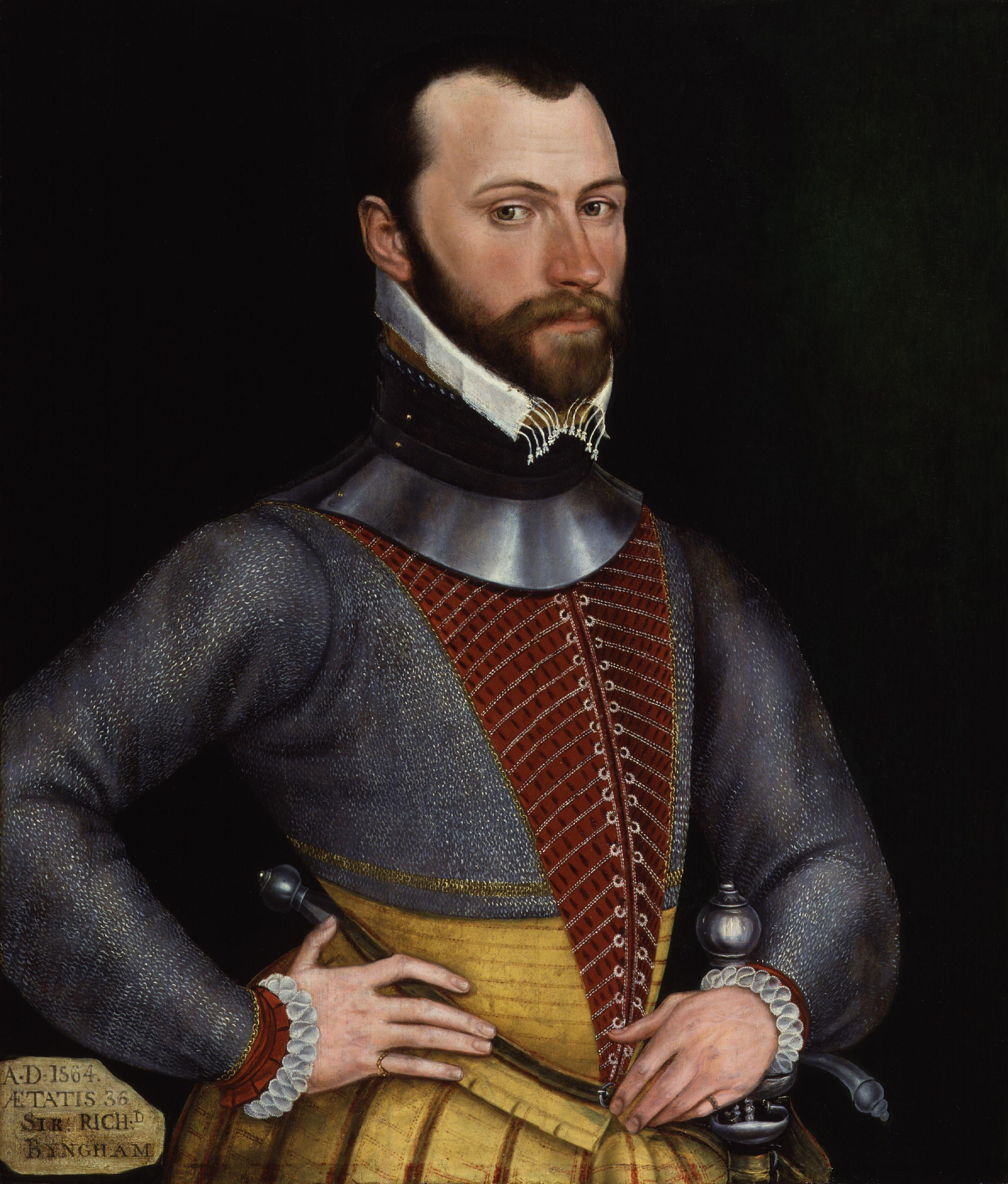
O'Donnell launched raids against Richard Bingham, Lord President of Connacht, who had persecuted Connacht's Gaelic population.

In 1595, O'Donnell began to expand his rebellion into Connacht. His ancestors, particularly his grandfather Manus O'Donnell, had ruled over Lower Connacht, and Hugh Roe O'Donnell increasingly demanded the restoration of these lands. Richard Bingham had persecuted Connacht's Gaelic population since the mid-1580s, causing many refugees to flee to Tyrconnell. O'Donnell aided the refugees and recruited many of them as swordsmen. O'Donnell resented Bingham and was "easily tempted" by the refugees, who urged him to attack Bingham's administration. O'Donnell invaded Connacht on 3 March 1595 with 400 men. From Rathcroghan, the province's ancient royal capital, he launched large raids into Longford and Roscommon. In June 1595, the castle of Sligo, which was key to securing control over the province, was betrayed to O'Donnell "in a stroke of luck"; Bingham's government collapsed. O'Donnell reestablished Brehon law and asserted suzerainty over north Connacht.

By 1595, O'Donnell and his wife were facing difficulties; Rose had not borne him children. In order to increase his influence in southern Connacht, O'Donnell had hopes of a marriage alliance with Lady Margaret Burke, daughter of the neutral 3rd Earl of Clanricarde. With Tyrone's consent, Rose and O'Donnell separated. However, the government became aware of his plan to reportedly take Margaret from her parents by surprise or force, and in December she was placed in protective custody. Additionally Clanricarde stated he would "rather see [Margaret's] burial than her marriage to [O'Donnell] were he a good subject". Tyrone sent his trusted secretary Henry Hovenden to Tyrconnell to advise O'Donnell, and O'Donnell eventually took Rose back. His choice to remain in a marriage with no children is representative of his dependence on Tyrone.

== Peace talks ==
=== Negotiations with the Crown ===
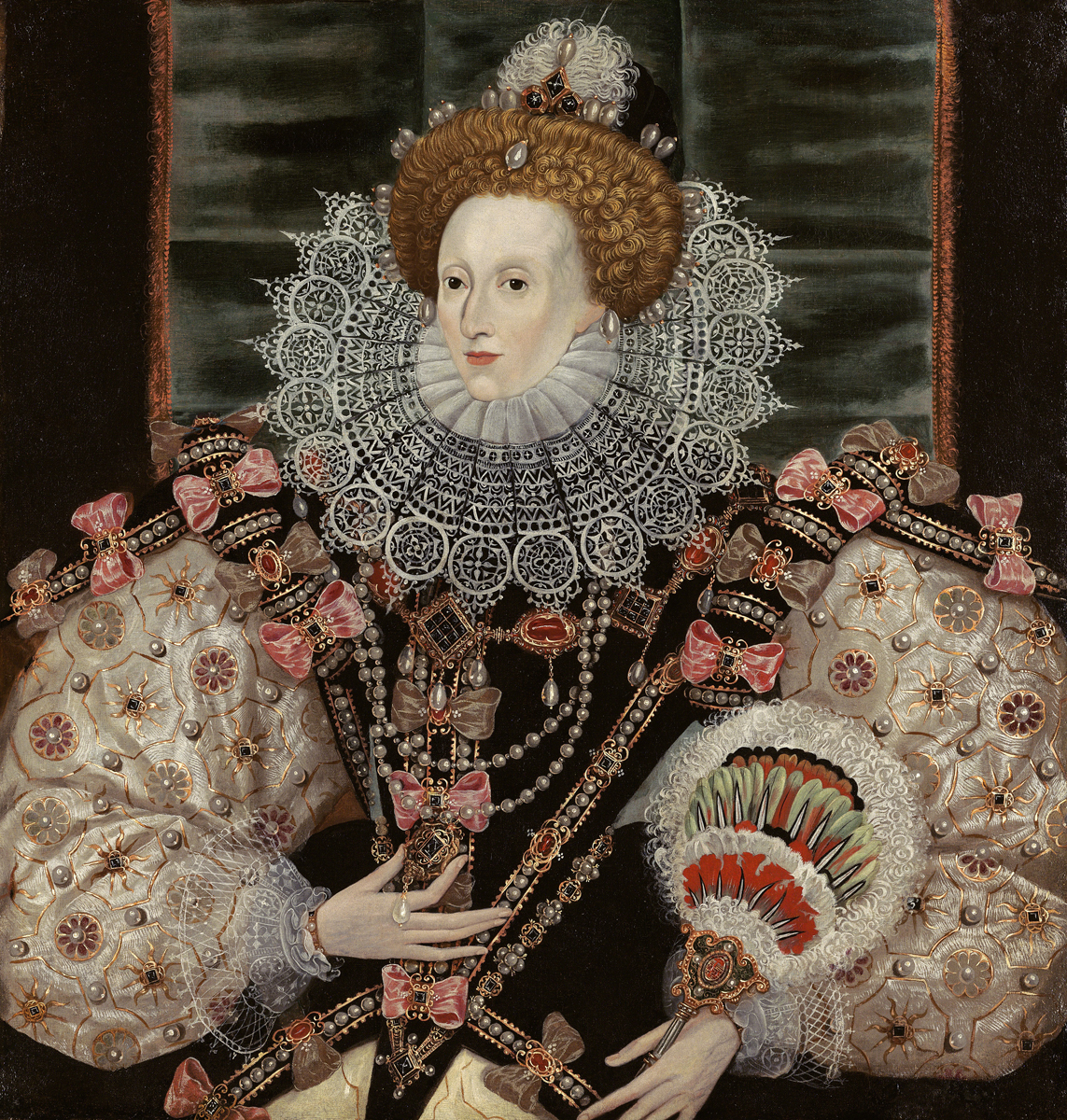
O'Donnell lived under the reign of English monarch Elizabeth I (1558–1603), who asserted herself as "Queen of Ireland".

Tyrone and O'Donnell sought to delay the war in order to buy time for the arrival of Spanish troops. In September 1595, Tyrone sent overtures of submission to the Crown, and convinced O'Donnell to agree to a ceasefire. O'Donnell tendered his submission in October, expressing his "inward sorrow and most harty repentance". A cessation of arms was signed on 27 October. O'Donnell took advantage of the truce to intervene in Connacht politics. Accompanied by Cormac MacBaron and Tyrone's son Conn, he led a large force of troops into Mayo in December. During Christmas-time, O'Donnell stage-managed the election of Connacht exile Tibbot MacWalter Kittagh as the Lower MacWilliam Bourke. Further elections organised by O'Donnell, spanning four counties, were indicative of his growing power in Connacht.

In January 1596, O'Donnell and Tyrone entered into face-to-face negotiations with government commissioners. The two confederates would only meet the commissioners in the open country, so negotiations were conducted in the countryside near Dundalk. O'Donnell demanded his ancestral claims of lands in Sligo, exemption from the jurisdiction of a sheriff, and a pardon for Connacht men including O'Rourke and MacWilliam Bourke. Like Tyrone, he demanded religious liberty of conscience. The Queen warily accepted O'Donnell's claims to lands in Connacht. On 28 January, the commissioners presented O'Donnell with a list of twelve articles. These urged him to disperse his forces, to shire Tyrconnell, to stop aiding O'Rourke and Maguire, to re-edify Sligo Castle, to pay annual rents to the Crown as his father had done, and to confess the extent of his dealings with Spain. O'Donnell rejected certain articles, forcing a compromise. He agreed to terms on 30 January, and further negotiations to develop a peace treaty were almost complete by May.

=== Relations with Spain ===
In May, three Spanish ships arrived at Tyrconnell with the aim of encouraging the confederates and assessing Ireland's military situation. Spanish captain Alonso Cobos arrived in Killybegs and was invited by O'Donnell to Lifford, where he was staying. O'Donnell refused to go into further conversation without Tyrone present, indicating that he regarded Tyrone as his superior at this point. When the confederates arrived at Lifford, a subsequent dinner took place. The confederates upheld their allegiance to Spain and pleaded for Philip II to re-establish Catholicism across Ireland. Spanish emissaries noted O'Donnell and his father-in-law "acted like one man and were respected by the rest", though a list of confederates drawn up by Cobos' secretary was altered to place Tyrone's name above O'Donnell's.

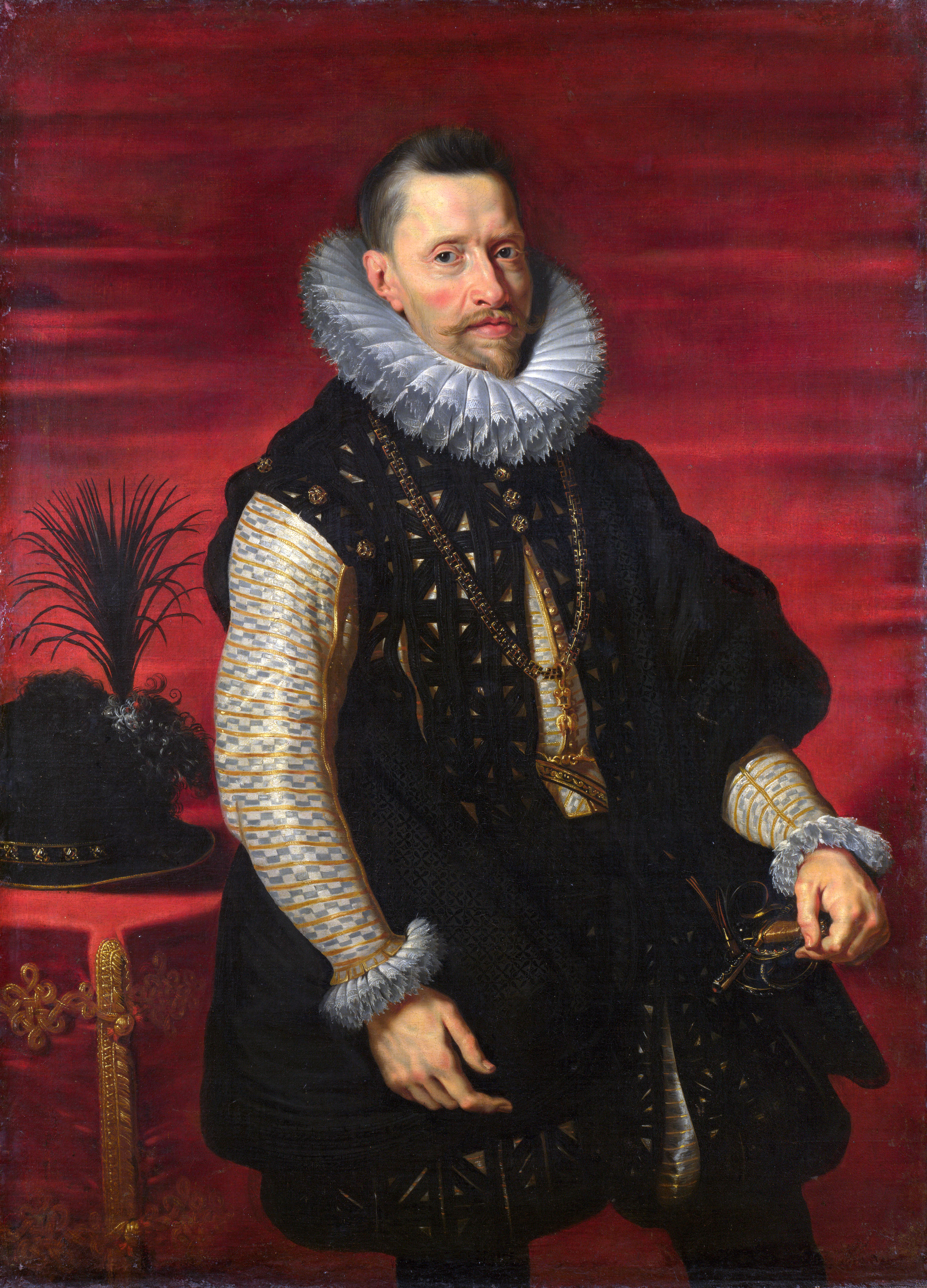
O'Donnell sought to make Albert VII Ireland's new Catholic sovereign.

Later on, a secret talk between Cobos and O'Donnell, Tyrone, and Cormac MacBaron occurred in a small house beside Lifford's castle. Hugh Boye MacDavitt of Inishowen, a war veteran who had served in the Low Countries, served as their interpreter. After the meeting, the confederates jointly agreed to abandon the peace treaty and become vassals of Philip II. Tyrone and O'Donnell also petitioned Philip II to make Albert VII, Archduke of Austria, the new Catholic monarch of Ireland. O'Donnell and his father-in-law began to deliberately derail peace negotiations and provoke war in previously peaceful parts of the country. They developed a sophisticated "good cop, bad cop" routine and intentionally used each other's absences to stall peace talks. Additionally, O'Donnell was ashamed at the sparse nature of his residence and set about purchasing "linen and pewter and all other necessaries fit to entertain the Spaniards".

The commissioners were in a weak position due to Elizabeth I's health issues. In July, O'Donnell met with Tyrone, O'Rourke and MacWilliam Bourke at Strabane. Together, they issued a letter to Munster's population demanding they adhere to Catholicism and join the confederacy. In October, Cobos was sent back to Ireland to brief the confederates on the impending 2nd Spanish Armada. Cobos's briefing motivated O'Donnell to make extensive preparations for the arrival of Spanish troops in Tyrconnell. After much delay, the Armada sailed from Lisbon in late October 1596, though it ended in disaster when a sudden storm claimed over 3,000 lives.

Elizabeth I reopened negotiations in Dundalk. O'Donnell's biographer Lughaidh Ó Cléirigh states Elizabeth offered to forfeit Ulster to the confederates, with the exception of land from Dundalk to the Boyne. O'Donnell was apparently instrumental in the confederacy's rejection of this offer—he was possibly motivated by Philip II's recently renewed interest in Ireland. O'Donnell's relationships with Spain and England were complicated by the fact that aging monarchs Philip II and Elizabeth I were both in ill health at the time.

== Renewal of hostilities ==
=== Clifford's presidency ===
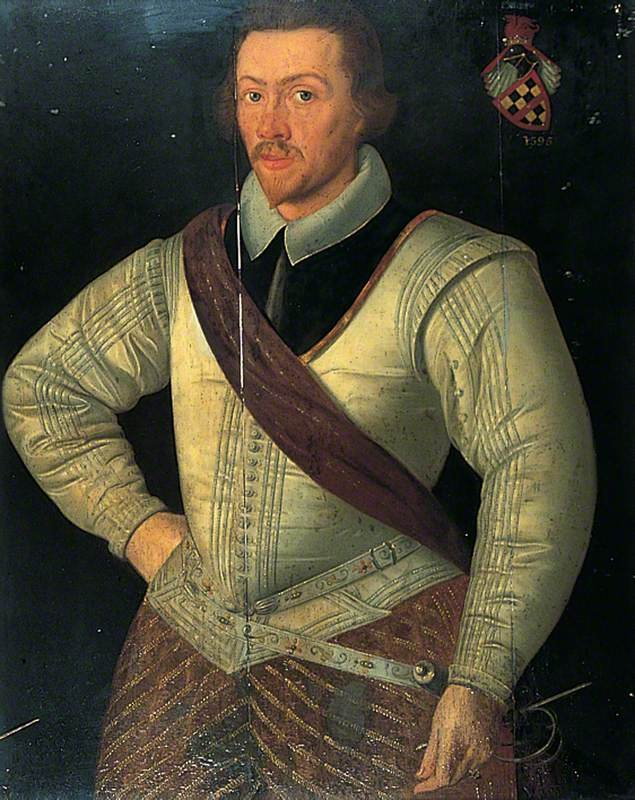
Conyers Clifford succeeded Bingham as Connacht's Lord President. After his death at the Battle of Curlew Pass, his severed head was carried by O'Donnell as a trophy.

Elizabeth I suspended Bingham from the presidency of Connacht. Distinguished soldier Conyers Clifford was made Connacht's chief commissioner in December 1596. O'Donnell again raided into Connacht in January 1597, sacking Athenry and plundering the suburbs of Galway city. He was supported by competitors to the Clanricarde title. Clifford responded by forcing MacWilliam Bourke from Mayo. O'Donnell reinstalled MacWilliam Bourke, but Clifford forced him out again in June.

Thomas Burgh took over as Lord Deputy in May 1597. Burgh refused to entertain the confederates' excuses and ordered a prompt two-pronged military assault on both Tyrone and O'Donnell. In July, Clifford assembled 1,500 men at Boyle and led them into Tyrconnell as the western arm of the assault. The royal army besieged Ballyshannon castle for five days, but it was successfully defended by O'Donnell's garrison (which included Spaniards), forcing a retreat. On 4 September 1597, Clifford was appointed as Connacht's new Lord President. Lord Deputy Burgh died from illness in October. Despite the confederacy's advantageous position, Tyrone renewed peace negotiations; an eight-week ceasefire was agreed on. O'Donnell heavily criticised Tyrone's tactic, pointing out that the confederate forces were strong across Leinster, Connacht and Ulster. O'Donnell declared he would break the ceasefire, though he never did.

Clifford changed tactics following the defeat at Ballyshannon. He encouraged confederates to change sides by promising them royal grants. In February 1598, founding confederacy member O'Rourke submitted at Boyle. By April, Clifford had lured at least three confederates to the English side, including O'Donnell's cousin Shane McManus Oge. In response, O'Donnell imprisoned his cousin and executed at least 22 men linked to the turncoats. Clifford also convinced Rory to serve against his older brother. When this news reached O'Donnell, he had Rory clamped in chains—the brothers' relationship eventually improved and Rory was once again fighting alongside his older brother by 1600. O'Donnell captured O'Rourke's half-brother Teigue and forced him to marry his sister Mary in order to formalise an alliance and antagonise O'Rourke. By June 1598, O'Rourke had rejoined the confederacy in fear.

=== Battle of the Yellow Ford ===
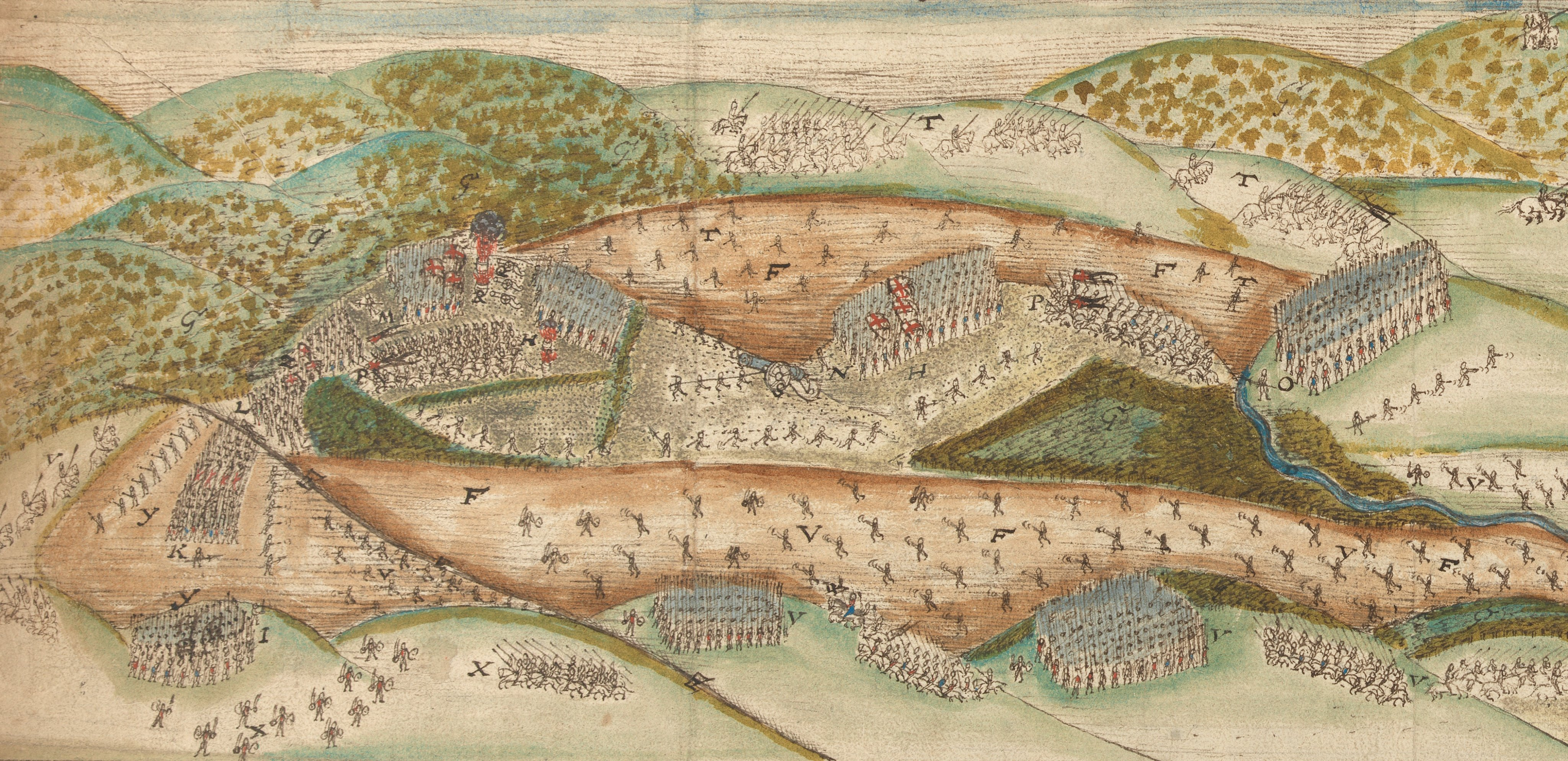
The Battle of the Yellow Ford was the greatest confederate victory during the Nine Years' War.

Government commissioners abandoned negotiations by spring 1598, recognising that O'Donnell and Tyrone were intentionally impeding the peace process. Tyrone resumed hostilites when the truce expired in June by besieging the Blackwater Fort. Henry Bagenal and his army were dispatched to relieve the fort. Tyrone called O'Donnell and Maguire to assemble their combined forces numbering 5,000 men. The confederates made extensive plans to obstruct Bagenal's army, preparing deep trenches in the ground outside Armagh. Prior to the attack, the confederates made a speech "to incite their people to acts of valour". On 14 August, Bagenal's army was attacked by O'Donnell, Tyrone and Maguire's combined forces. O'Donnell attacked from the left and Tyrone from the right simultaneously. Bagenal was killed and roughly 2,000 men (half his army) were lost. O'Donnell's men ran out of ammunition and the English survivors fled to Armagh. More than 300 English soldiers deserted to the confederacy.

The battle was the greatest victory by Irish forces against England, and it sparked a general revolt throughout the country, particularly in Munster. News of the battle spread across western Europe, prompting Philip II to send congratulatory letters to O'Donnell and Tyrone. Unfortunately for the confederacy, Philip II died in September and was succeeded by his son Philip III. Following the battle, O'Donnell purchased Ballymote Castle from Clan MacDonagh and made it his primary residence. He also organised an attack on the O'Malleys in County Mayo. In December, O'Donnell led another successful raid into Clanricarde.

The confederates' victory unravelled much of Clifford's success in Connacht, leaving loyalist Donough O'Connor Sligo (Lord of Lower Connacht) as his only Gaelic Irish ally. The Irish victory at the Yellow Ford was highly distressing to the English Privy Council, and after much hesitation Elizabeth I appointed her royal favourite, Robert Devereux, 2nd Earl of Essex, as the new Lord Deputy. He arrived at Dublin in April 1599. Despite the generous resources afforded to him, Essex's campaign was a major failure on account of his poor generalship.

=== Battle of Curlew Pass ===
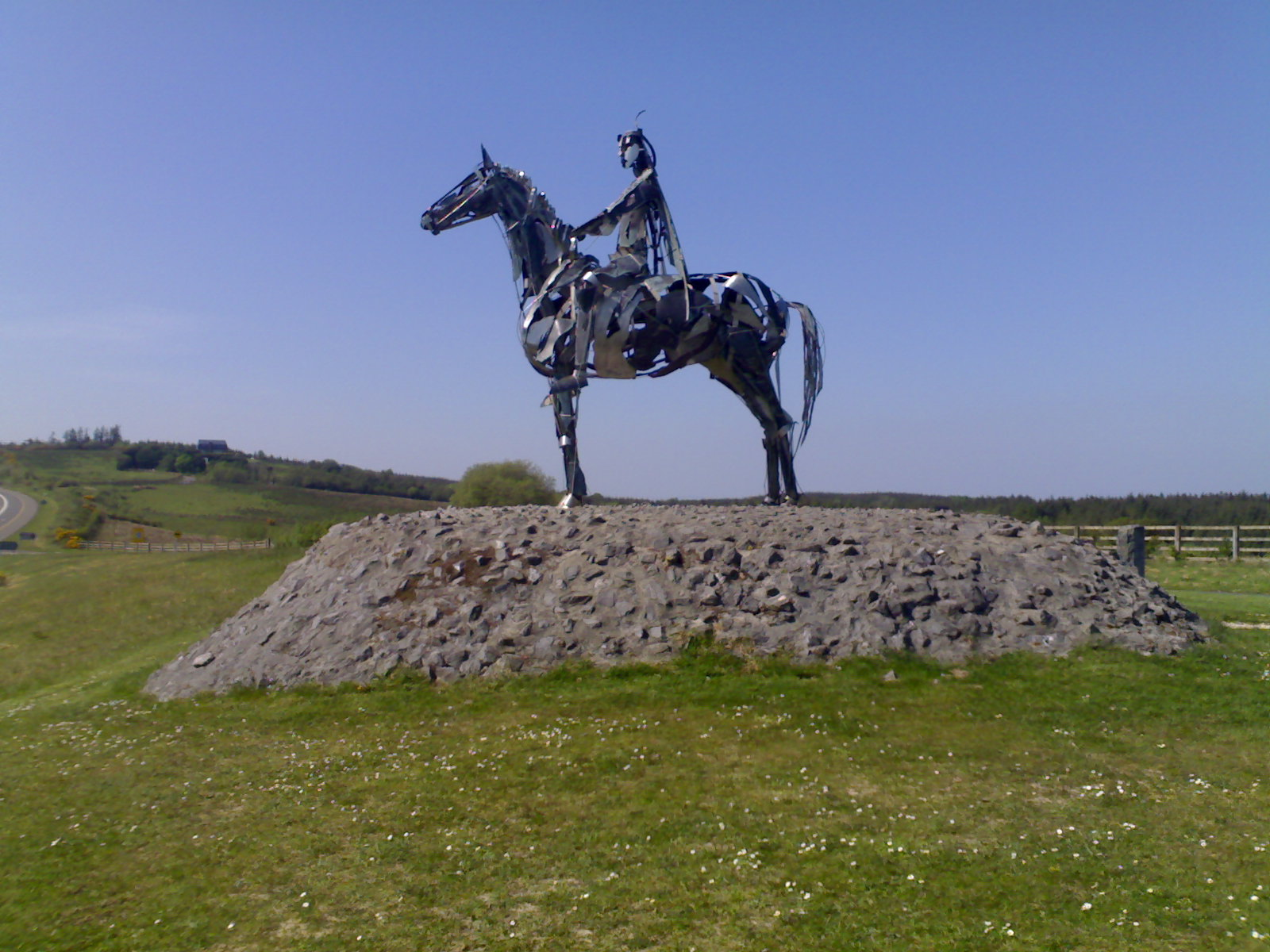
The Gaelic Chieftain (1999) by Maurice Harron, located near Boyle, commemorates the Battle of Curlew Pass.

In July 1599, Essex sent O'Connor Sligo to confront O'Donnell. In response, O'Donnell quickly laid siege to O'Connor Sligo's stronghold, Collooney Castle. Essex then ordered Clifford to relieve O'Connor Sligo, and Clifford subsequently led an expedition of 1,400 men towards Collooney Castle. O'Donnell left Niall Garbh to continue the siege and he took up a position in the Curlew Mountains, where he remained for two months, deliberately provoking Clifford. In August, Clifford finally gave in and marched his troops into the Curlew Mountains. O'Donnell made a dramatic speech and prepared his men.

Once O'Donnell's brothers had lured Clifford's army into a prepared position, O'Donnell and O'Rourke (who was camped nearby) ambushed Clifford's forces in a swift battle. The English panicked and were routed back to Boyle Abbey. 240 English soldiers were killed, including Clifford who was stabbed by a pike. After the battle, O'Rourke decapitated Clifford and gave the head to O'Donnell. When O'Donnell presented Clifford's severed head to O'Connor Sligo, the latter surrendered Collooney Castle. The Queen and her secretary of state Robert Cecil were shocked by the Irish victory. The victory is considered a highlight of O'Donnell's career, though contemporary sources credit O'Rourke and Conor McDermot with the battle's success.

O'Donnell forced O'Connor Sligo to join the confederacy, and he gave O'Connor Sligo oxen, horses, cattle and corn to re-establish himself in lower Connacht. However, he threatened O'Connor Sligo with imprisonment on an island in Lough Eske if he did not cooperate. By this time Iníon Dubh had been in Scotland for two months gathering redshanks—as Clifford's forces had been easily defeated, O'Donnell notified his mother the redshanks were unnecessary, and she returned to Tyrconnell in January 1600 with gunpowder instead. O'Donnell followed the victory at Curlew Pass with a successful battle at the Ballaghboy Pass.

=== Quarrels with Tyrone ===
By the late 1590s, O'Donnell's relationship with his father-in-law was coming under strain, not least because of the breakdown of O'Donnell's marriage to Rose. In April 1597, it was reported O'Donnell had recently renewed his alliance with Tyrone by his "receiving of the earl's base daughter" in marriage. By 1598, O'Donnell and Rose had divorced—likely against Tyrone's wishes—and Rose had remarried to Tyrone's principal vassal Donnell Ballagh O'Cahan. O'Donnell reportedly divorced Rose due to her "barronness", though Donnelly has questioned this truthfulness of this explanation, considering that O'Donnell did not immediately remarry to ensure an heir.

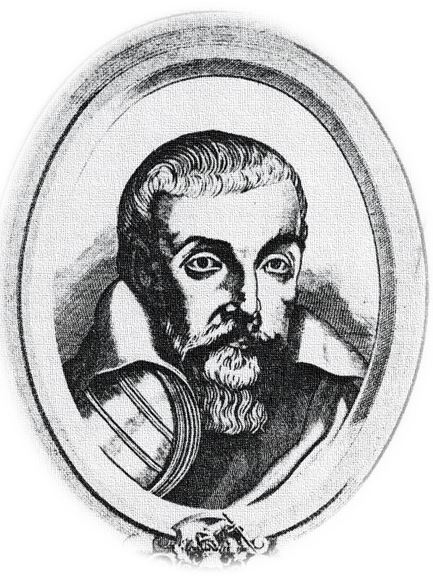
O'Donnell's partnership with Tyrone became strained over the former's divorce, their differing military approaches, and the division of resources from Spain.

The confederacy leaders argued over the division of money and munitions sent from Spain. Tyrone typically demanded the superior portion; when munitions arrived in 1596, Tyrone took twenty firkins of gunpowder compared to O'Donnell receiving fifteen. This came to a head in mid-1599 when a debate ensued over the unequal division of a delivery brought by Barrionuevo. Tyrone strongly objected when O'Donnell claimed he was owed more resources in view of his recent victories and his riskier approach to warfare. An Irish bishop, brought in as a mediator, ruled in O'Donnell's favour. Subsequently a treaty of equality was established between the two confederates, which decreed "one had no pre-eminence over the other and that in walking and travelling together whichever was the elder should be on the right hand".

Tyrone refused to fight Essex's dwindling forces; instead the two men parleyed on 7 September 1599 and a six-week truce was organised. O'Donnell was furious at Tyrone's decision to negotiate with Essex, as he wanted to avoid any association with English officials in favour of soliciting aid from the Spanish. He declared he would travel into Connacht, but Tyrone forbid him on account of the truce. O'Donnell admitted he would burn the entire Pale if not for Tyrone preventing him. Essex left Ireland on 24 September and was shortly afterwards removed from his post. His downfall briefly put the confederacy in a strong position. In February 1600, Charles Blount, 8th Baron Mountjoy, arrived in Ireland as the new Lord Deputy. Mountjoy posed a major threat to the confederacy as he immediately began revitalising and restoring confidence in the royal army.

In early 1600, commander Hugh Maguire was shot and killed near Cork. His lordship was contested by rival claimants Cúconnacht Maguire (his younger half-brother) and Connor Roe Maguire. Tyrone favoured Connor Roe's accession, perhaps to ensure Connor Roe's loyalism was kept in check. O'Donnell favoured Cúconnacht, and a debate ensued on how to resolve the succession crisis. At a banquet at Tyrone's house in Dungannon, with Tyrone and both claimants present, O'Donnell addressed Cúconnacht as the new Maguire clan chief. O'Donnell's fait accompli affronted Tyrone and created further tension between the confederates.

In April 1600, a Spanish ship arrived in Ireland bearing considerable supplies of munitions for the confederacy. Tyrone and O'Donnell stimulated the Irish-Spanish alliance by sending pledges to Spain; Tyrone sent his son Henry, and O'Donnell sent the sons of O'Doherty and O'Gallagher.

== Forced from Tyrconnell ==
=== Niall Garbh's defection ===
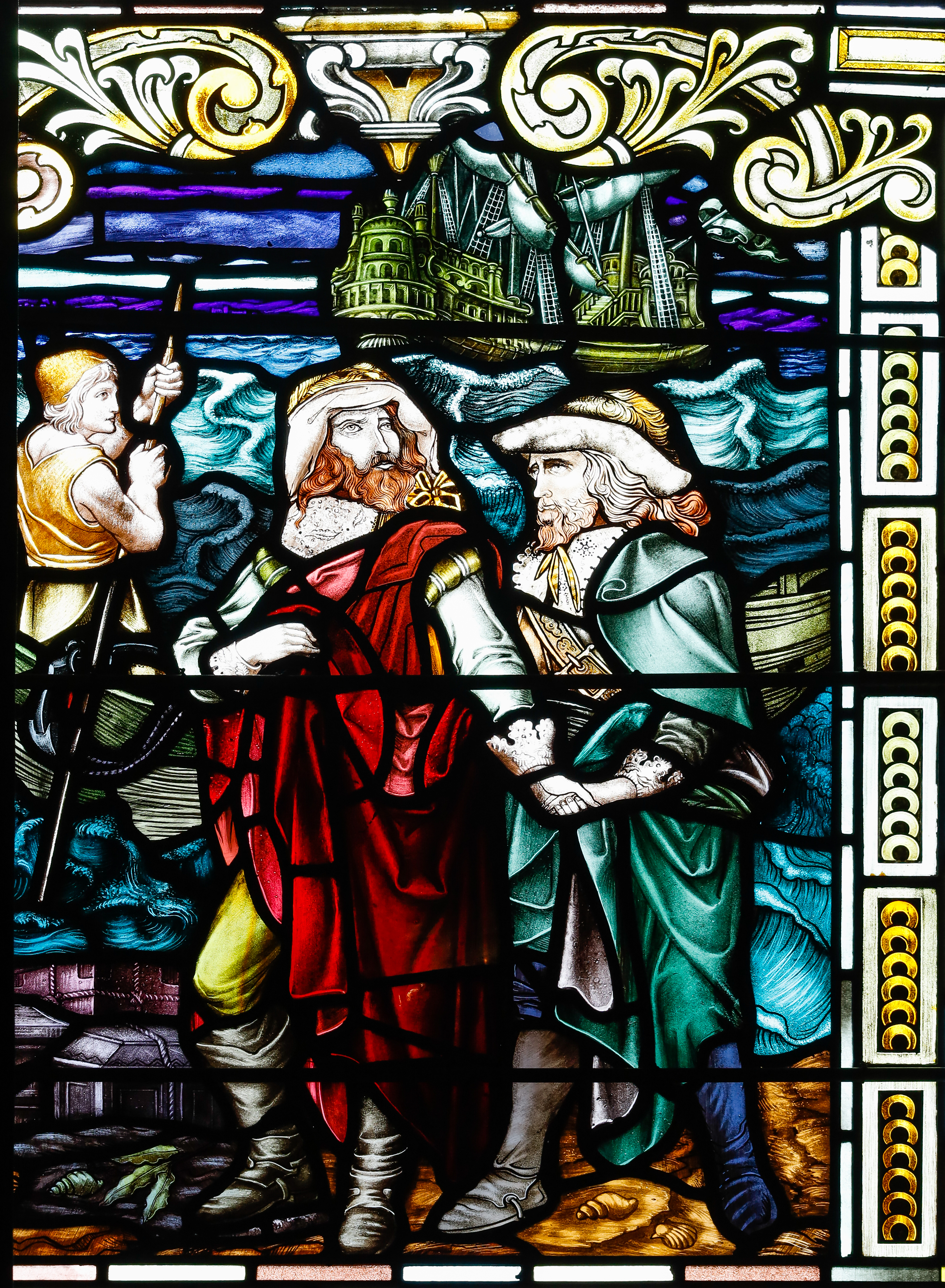
Commander Henry Docwra enticed Niall Garbh to defect from the confederacy, which greatly weakened O'Donnell's power in Tyrconnell.

In May 1600, English commander Henry Docwra established an English garrison in Derry. O'Donnell made multiple attacks on Docwra's forces, almost killing Docwra on 29 July. Despite constant Irish attacks and poor conditions at the garrison, Docwra managed to maintain his position, which led to further tension between O'Donnell and Tyrone. The prospects of Docwra's mission depended on winning over disaffected confederates, Niall Garbh being the most important. Docwra and Niall Garbh began secretly communicating. By August, Niall Garbh had sent his list of demands, the principal of which was to rule Tyrconnell like his grandfather Calvagh. Docwra promised to obtain Niall Garbh a royal grant of Tyrconnell if he served against his cousin.

In September, O'Donnell left Ulster for a raid in Thomond, entrusting Niall Garbh to besiege Derry. (Note: O'Donnell had previously entrusted Niall Garbh to besiege Derry in June 1600, when he left Ulster to plunder south Connacht and north Munster.) Whilst O'Donnell was in Ballymote, Niall Garbh and his followers murdered Niall Garbh's uncle Neachtan in a drunken rage. Neachtan was "a man of great authority with [O'Donnell] and all his country". Fearing O'Donnell's revenge, Niall Garbh—alongside his three brothers and about 100 soldiers—quickly defected to the English. They joined Docwra on 3 October. O'Donnell was "dumb-stricken" to hear of Niall Garbh's betrayal and could not drink or sleep for three days. He immediately hurried to secure Lifford Castle to retain control over Lough Foyle. Niall Garbh and an English force stormed Lifford Castle on 9 October, taking it from O'Donnell's brother Rory. O'Donnell subsequently blamed Tyrone for wasting confederate resources at the Battle of Moyry Pass.

"O'Donnell hath of late hanged many of good account . . . he dasht owt the brains of Neil Garve's childe (of [four] yeares olde) againste a post, beinge in the mother's custody, his owne naturall sister."

— Report by Henry Docwra, February 1601

O'Donnell's sister Nuala separated from Niall Garbh due to his defection. According to a February 1601 report by Docwra, O'Donnell was so outraged by his brother-in-law's defection he ordered mass hangings of Niall Garbh's followers. He personally killed Niall Garbh and Nuala's four-year-old child, his own niece or nephew, by bashing the child's brains out against a post. This accusation is considered contentious among historians. Docwra's biographer John McGurk acknowledges the uncertainty of the report's truthfulness, and notes it is unclear where Docwra received this intelligence. He points out Docwra's "blunt" personality indicates he reported current affairs accurately, and also admits infanticide was a feature of warfare in the early modern period. Morgan notes since this is a contemporary account, it should not be dismissed out of hand.

=== Battle of Lifford ===
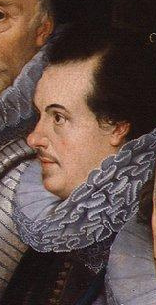
The confederacy suffered—and eventually surrendered—under the deputyship of Charles Blount, 8th Baron Mountjoy.

O'Donnell tried in vain to retake Lifford from Niall Garbh, with minor skirmishes occurring around the castle. He lost about 20 men on 17 October 1600. He attacked again on 24 October, but Niall Garbh retaliated by leading a cavalry charge of mixed Irish and English forces out to battle. During the battle, Niall Garbh speared O'Donnell's brother Manus in the shoulder. Manus was taken to Donegal where he died from his wounds. O'Donnell's father Hugh McManus died a few weeks afterwards, apparently from grief. They were buried beside each other at Donegal Abbey, as was customary for the ruling O'Donnell branch.

Docwra was pleased Manus's death had exacerbated the feud between O'Donnell and Niall Garbh. By December 1600, O'Donnell had put a price of £300 on Niall Garbh's head. It appears Niall Garbh made later efforts to rejoin the confederacy, but his murder of Manus made this near-impossible. His defection allowed Docwra to mobilise the Crown's forces beyond Lough Foyle into Tyrconnell, Inishowen and even Tír Eoghain. In addition to his skill as a guide across Tyrconnell, Niall Garbh informed Docwra of his cousin's tactics.

=== Political alliances collapse ===
O'Donnell made further plans to cement his alliances beyond Ulster. In November 1600, he schemed to marry Joan FitzGerald, the step-daughter of O'Connor Sligo and sister of the loyalist 1st Earl of Desmond. A servant met with Joan in Limerick to convince her of the marriage, but Joan rejected the match. O'Donnell became frustrated by the Spanish government's failure to send the desired military resources. When a Spanish ship arrived around the time of the new year, O'Donnell was angered when he learnt about no forthcoming aid. He wanted to go to Spain immediately, and he might have had the Spanish captain allowed him.

Map of Ulster, c. 1598, displaying the province's various Gaelic kingdoms

The death of Sean O'Doherty in early January 1601 led to a succession dispute. O'Donnell was bribed into inaugurating Sean's half-brother, and his own first cousin, Phelim Og O'Doherty as successor. This outraged the foster family of Cahir, Sean's eldest son, and they opened negotiations with Docwra to secure the lordship. O'Donnell attempted revenge by invading Inishowen with 1,500 men, but 40 of his men were killed and he retreated.

Both Docwra and O'Donnell's conduct of war was vicious; soldiers and civilians on either side were summarily executed (including Bishop Redmond O'Gallagher). In February 1601, Docwra noted O'Donnell was regularly hanging individuals of otherwise good standing at the slightest cause for suspicion. When O'Donnell discovered O'Connor Sligo was plotting with Mountjoy in early 1601, he imprisoned O'Connor Sligo in Lough Eske Castle's prison. Docwra plundered and garrisoned Rathmullan. By April, five of O'Donnell's major allies, including Chiefs MacSweeney Banagh and Fanad, were preparing to submit to Docwra. By the end of 1601, only the immediate families of O'Donnell and Hugh McHugh Dubh remained loyal to the confederacy. Ballyshannon Castle became a safe haven for masses of women and children. Others took refuge in Lower Connacht. In late October 1601, O'Donnell's mother Iníon Dubh, plus one of his sisters, were taken prisoner in Collooney Castle.

=== Siege of Donegal ===
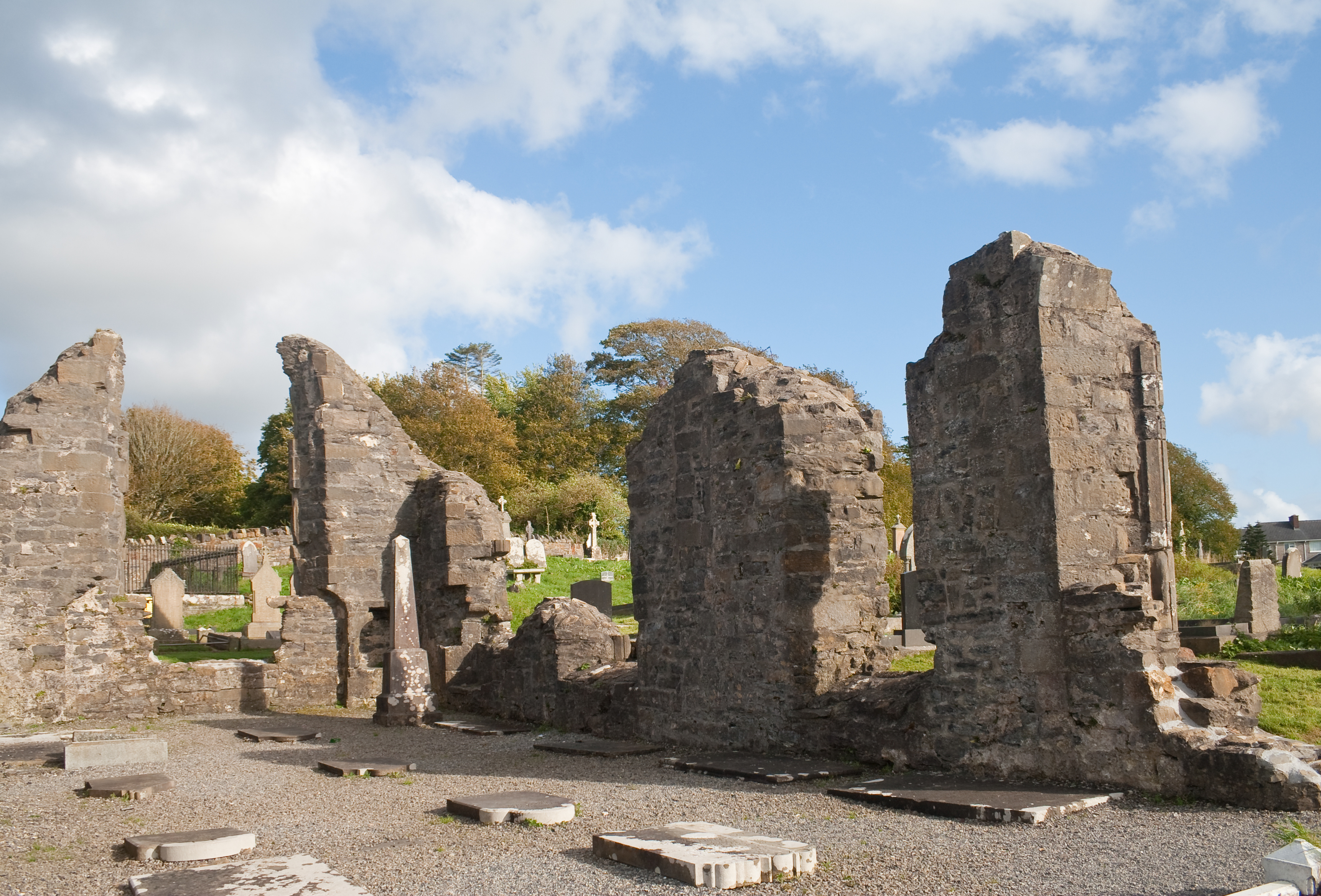
The ruins of Donegal Abbey in 2009

On 18 March 1601, the government recognised Niall Garbh as the rightful chief of the O'Donnell clan. Hugh Roe O'Donnell marched on Lifford in April 1601, forcing Niall Garbh and his forces to temporarily retreat to Derry. Following the Earl of Clanricarde's death in May, O'Donnell concentrated his forces at Ballymote in anticipation of an attack from Clanricarde's successor. This allowed Niall Garbh to take Donegal Abbey in August and occupy it as a garrison, installing 500 English troops. His hold over Donegal was his greatest blow against O'Donnell; it virtually prevented O'Donnell from entering Tyrconnell and led to a month-long siege. The siege climaxed on 19 September, when a fire in the garrison's store detonated several barrels of gunpowder and caused the abbey to collapse. O'Donnell hurriedly ordered his men to attack, leading to a chaotic engagement amidst the burning abbey. Niall Garbh's defeat seemed certain, but the loyalist forces held out until a relief force arrived and forced O'Donnell to call off the attack. Many of Niall Garbh's troops were killed during the battle, including his brother Conn Oge.

Niall Garbh was so unsettled by his losses at the siege that, with Docwra's permission, he began negotiating with O'Donnell to become his tanist. Niall Garbh's conditions were so numerous that O'Donnell discarded negotiations.

=== Siege of Kinsale ===
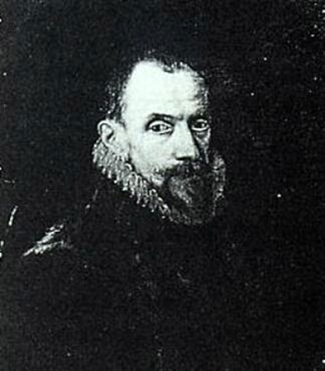
Spanish general Juan del Águila fought with O'Donnell at Kinsale.

Throughout 1601, Philip III was focused on dispatching an armed expedition to Ireland to improve his position in the Anglo-Spanish War. Under the command of General Juan del Águila, the 4th Spanish Armada finally landed and was besieged by English forces inside the port town of Kinsale—virtually the opposite end of Ireland from Ulster—on 21 September 1601. O'Donnell was energised by the news of the Spanish expedition's long-awaited arrival and he called his forces to abandon their siege of Niall Garbh's forces. He set out for Kinsale from Ballymote in late October (Note: Sources differ on the exact date; either 23 October [N.S. 2 November] or 19 October [N.S. 29 October].) with about 2,000 men. O'Donnell's men carried two garrons loaded with Spanish silver on their march; this was to impress his wealth and wisdom upon locals he encountered. Tyrone's forces began their separate march towards Kinsale a week later. O'Donnell's army marched through Connacht to the River Shannon, where they were joined by Chief John Og McCoughlan and Captain Richard Tyrrell. Marching onwards they reached Druim-Saileach in County Tipperary, where the troops stopped for twenty days to plunder the neighbouring territories. O'Donnell visited Holy Cross Abbey on Saint Andrew's Day where he venerated its relic of the True Cross. He also dispatched an expedition to Ardfert, which included his nephew Donal Oge, to recover the territory of confederacy ally Thomas Fitzmaurice. Carew attempted to intercept O'Donnell on 7 November but O'Donnell eluded him by passing through a defile in the Slieve Felim Mountains. O'Donnell's forces regrouped in Connelloe, County Limerick, and finally united with Tyrone at Bandon on 15 December.

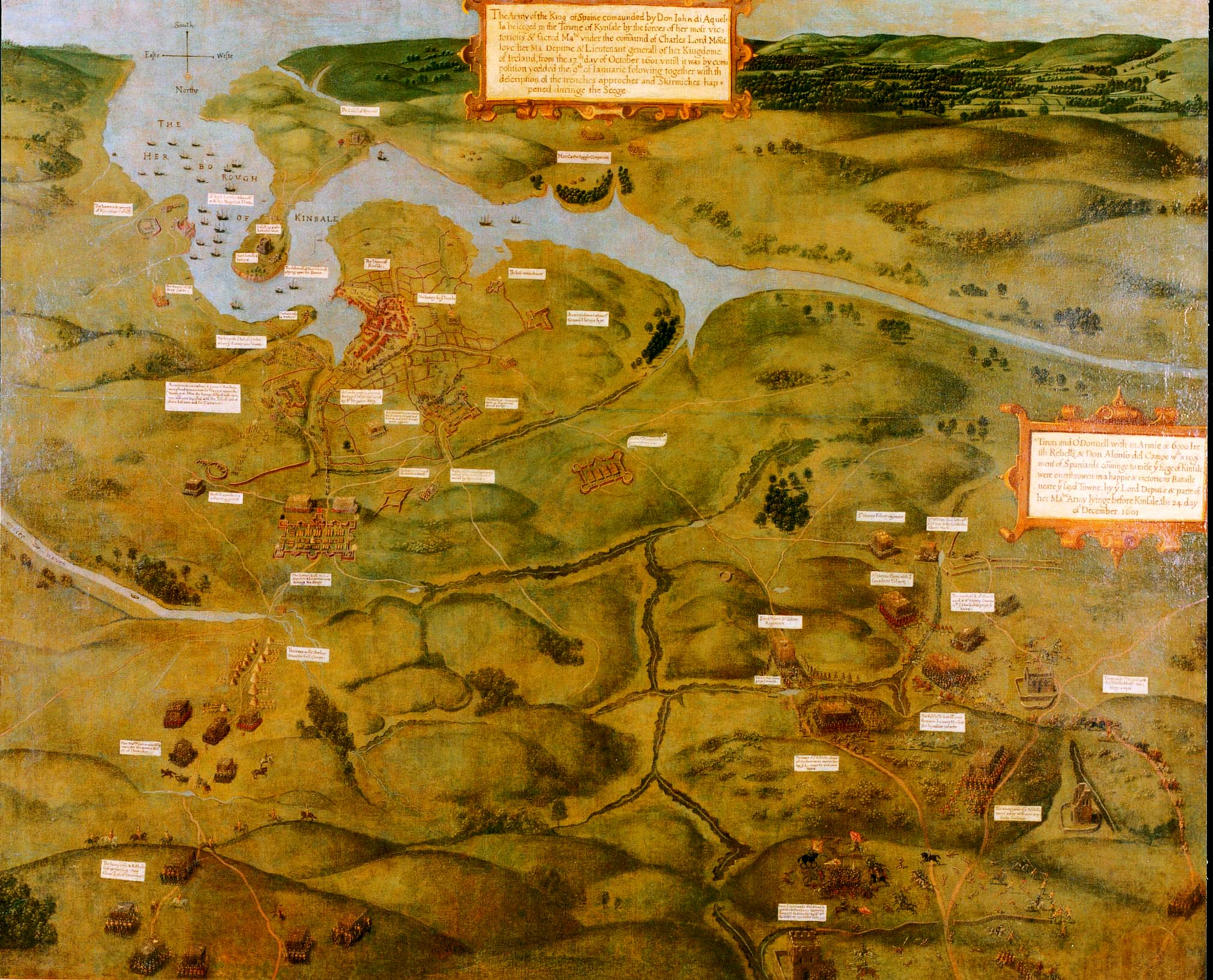
Map of the Siege of Kinsale

The Crown's army was trapped in Kinsale between the Irish and the Spaniards. Juan del Águila urged for a prompt combined attack, but Tyrone and O'Donnell were apparently conflicted in their preferred strategy. (Note: Both Ó Cléirigh and O'Sullivan Beare alleged that, despite Tyrone's initial plan to prolong the siege and force Mountjoy to retreat, O'Donnell convinced him to make a combined attack on the English army. This account is not unanimously accepted by historians. O'Donnell had previously induced Tyrone into a full frontal assault in 1597, so this narrative is consistent with their temperaments. It is possible the story was retroactively developed to excuse the defeat at Kinsale, or perhaps was an attempt by Ó Cléirigh to portray O'Donnell as a proactive supporter of the Spanish.) Pressure from the Spaniards was mounting and the confederates had their reputations on the line. Whatever the reason, Tyrone abandoned his characteristically cautious approach and agreed to an attack. At dawn on 24 December 1601, Tyrone's forces of 4,000 men took their position. Mountjoy spotted the soldiers and ordered an immediate attack. Tyrone retreated but Mountjoy's cavalry charge routed the confederate soldiers; 1,200 were killed and 800 were wounded. O'Donnell and his rearguard had become lost in the heavy morning fog and were too far off to aid Tyrone. The sight of butchered Irish forces demoralised O'Donnell's soldiers, and many fled despite O'Donnell's commands to stay and fight. O'Donnell's forces were lightly engaged but Tyrone's forces suffered the greatest losses. The defeat at Kinsale was a fatal blow for the confederacy and destroyed what remained of O'Donnell's military strength. Niall Garbh was left as the de facto ruler of Tyrconnell.

== Travel to Spain ==
=== Meeting with Philip III ===
The defeated confederates gathered at Innishannon. Tyrone was strongly in favour of attempting another siege, but was unable to convince O'Donnell, who was in a state of nervous breakdown. According to Ó Cléirigh, his followers feared he was on the verge of death. He became determined to travel to Spain to secure reinforcements from Philip III. Having been forced from Tyrconnell, O'Donnell had no property in Ulster to return to. In his absence, he appointed Rory as commander of his forces.

O'Donnell left Castlehaven on 27 December 1601 with General Pedro de Zubiaur. He was accompanied by Archbishop Florence Conroy, Maurice MacDonough Ultach, Redmond Burke and Captain Hugh Mostian. They arrived in Luarca on 3 January 1602 after travelling through a stormy passage. They were welcomed to A Coruña by Luis de Carillo, the governor of Galicia and Conde de Caracena, who was a political supporter of the confederacy's cause. He offered the group the hospitality of his seaside house. O'Donnell was also taken to sightsee the Farum Brigantium, where the legendary sons of Milesius left for Ireland.

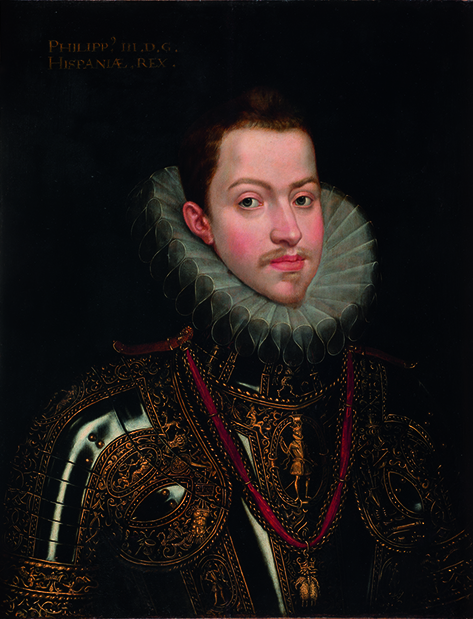
O'Donnell travelled to Spain to seek assistance from King Philip III.

Philip III agreed to meet with O'Donnell on the recommendation of his advisors; O'Donnell and his countrymen were escorted to Zamora to meet the king. When he arrived in the king's presence, O'Donnell knelt before him and vowed not to rise until three requests were granted:

1. To send a Spanish army (with O'Donnell) to Ireland;
2. To make O'Donnell the most powerful noble in Ireland, once it had been conquered by Spain;
3. To protect the rights of his clan and his successors.

Philip III agreed and bade O'Donnell to rise. During O'Donnell's time at the Spanish court, he met with Tyrone's son Henry, who was also his own half-nephew. He was treated for a bubonic plague sore by Tyrconnell physician Nial O'Glacan. He also spent much of his time working with Archbishop Mateo de Oviedo to assemble a case against Juan del Águila. The Spanish Council of State reported to the King "[O'Donnell's] zeal and loyalty should be highly praised... He should be assured that His Majesty regards the Irish Catholics as his subjects." Philip III granted O'Donnell a generous pension and ordered him to return to A Coruña to supervise the planned naval reinforcements.

=== Cancelled naval expedition ===
O'Donnell returned to A Coruña on 16 February, by which time he received news of Juan del Águila's surrender, which was not unexpected. O'Donnell wrote to the King two days later, begging him to focus his attention on sending the discussed naval expedition to Ireland. Although O'Donnell would have been content with a small-scale expedition sent to Tyrconnell, Philip III wanted to send a large fleet—three times the size of the 4th Armada—to ensure military success and restore his damaged reputation. Due to the time it would take to assemble a force of this size, O'Donnell was left anxiously waiting in Spain. Meanwhile, the confederacy disintegrated as English forces travelled across Ulster destroying crops and livestock. In June 1602, Tyrone burned Dungannon and retreated into Glenconkeyne. O'Donnell kept in contact with Ireland during this time—he wrote to one confederate "if there is anything bad it may be concealed from the Spaniard, but not from me".

Throughout 1602, O'Donnell was placated with promises that the Spanish fleet was being gradually assembled. He insistently asked to return to court to discuss the military situation. In March, O'Donnell was alarmed by the Duke of Lerma's suggestion that O'Donnell could be sent back to Ireland with only one ship and 50,000 ducats. On 10 June, O'Donnell wrote to Philip III: "I am weary of seeing how I am wasting my time here, and I fear that things are going on badly at home". By July it became clear that, due to delays, the envisioned fleet would not be ready until the next year. On 23 July, the ships already prepared at A Coruña were sent towards South America on an unrelated mission. O'Donnell's companions reported he was gripped "by an extreme melancholia and disgust [when] he saw the whole [Spanish] army suddenly diverted... without even a mention being made of Ireland". Philip III permitted O'Donnell to meet with him, and O'Donnell left A Coruña on 26 July to go to Simancas.

=== Death and burial ===
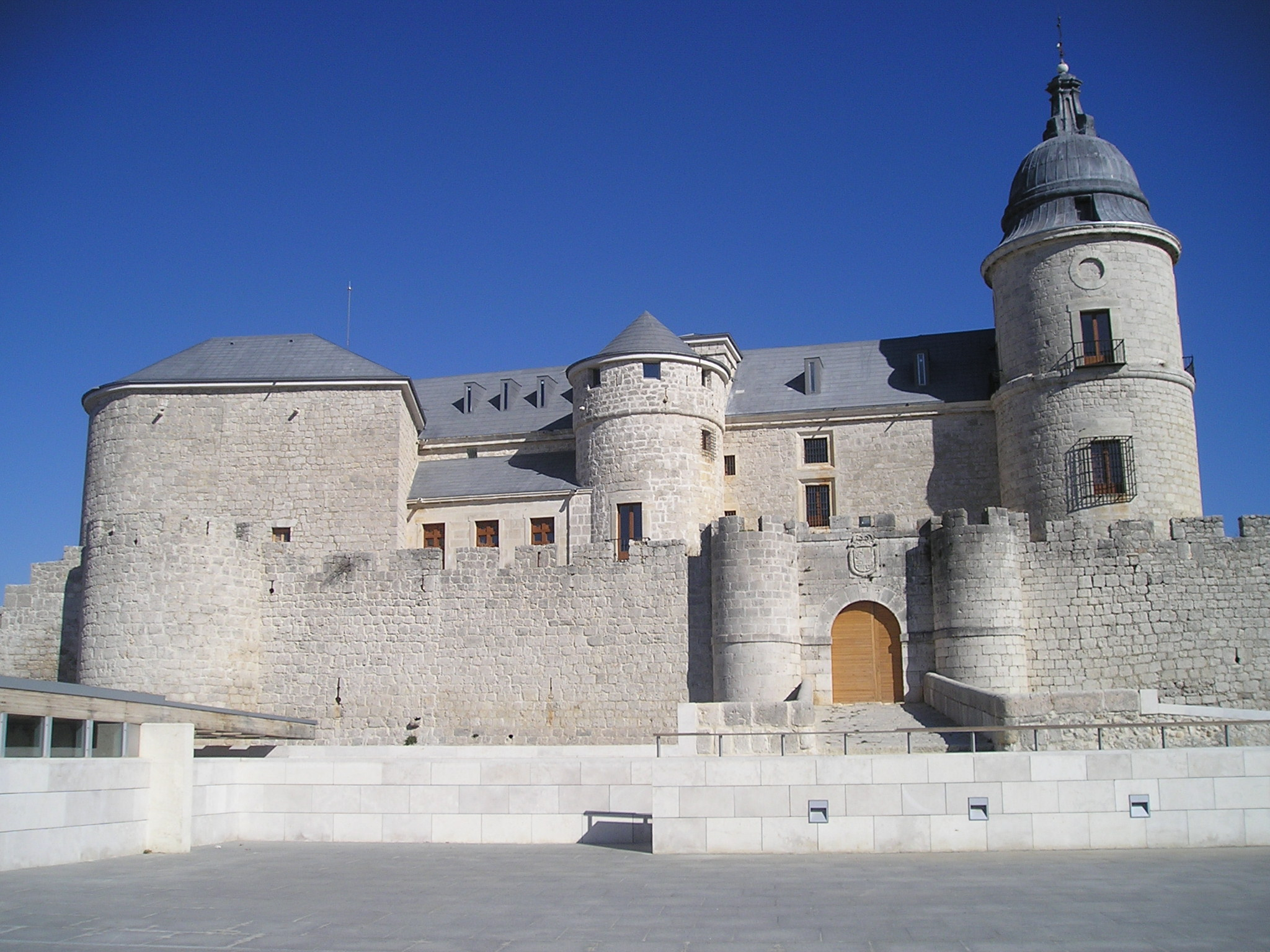
O'Donnell died of illness at the Castle of Simancas on 30 August 1602.

O'Donnell arrived at the Castle of Simancas on around 31 July. By 14 August he was extremely ill. He was attended by Irish doctor John Noonan; the guilty king also sent his own physician, Álvarez, to the castle. O'Donnell was aware he was dying. He received the last rites and was attended by Archbishop Conroy and two Franciscans, Maurice MacDonough Ultach and Maurice MacSean Ultach.

O'Donnell made his will on 28 August, whilst on his deathbed. He dictated his will in Irish, but Conroy translated it into Castilian Spanish for the notary. (Note: Other individuals present during the creation of O'Donnell's will include his secretary Matthew Tully, notary Diego de Albiz, witness Pedro de Monsalvo, and Philip III's servants Juan de Albiz and Juan Fernandez de Camara.) O'Donnell was in an extremely weak physical condition and could only blot the page when attempting to sign his signature. He warned against news of his death reaching Ireland before Spanish reinforcements arrived, as he believed the news would demotivate the confederacy and lead to a peace treaty with England. O'Donnell was content to be a vassal of the Spanish king if the Gaelic chiefs could keep their power over Ireland, which would effectively make Ireland a Spanish colony. He bequeathed his estates and vassals to his younger brother Rory.

After sixteen days of bedridden suffering, Hugh Roe O'Donnell died at the Castle of Simancas on 30 August 1602. (Note: Fr. Ludovico Mansoni, who was in Valladolid during O'Donnell's last weeks, wrote on 11 September (N.S.) that O'Donnell had died "the day before yesterday, which was the 9th" (O.S. 30 August). Both the State Papers and Ó Cléirigh's biography assert that O'Donnell instead died on the 10th (O.S. 31 August). The historian Frederick M. Jones notes that, because Mansoni was ten miles from Simancas and writing only days after O'Donnell's death, Mansoni's account is the most reliable.) He was 29 years of age, and left no children. The same evening, his body was taken to Valladolid in a four-wheeled hearse "with blazing torches and bright flambeaux of beautiful waxlights blazing all round on each side of it". The elaborate procession was attended by Philip III, state officers and council members. His funeral rites were performed in Valladolid on the morning of 1 September. Per his will, he was buried in the Convent of St. Francis, (Note: The Italian explorer Christopher Columbus was buried in the same convent almost 100 years earlier, and MacWilliam Bourke was buried there in November 1604.) in the Chapel of Wonders. (Note: Spanish: La Capilla de las Maravillas; also translated as the Chapel of Marvels.)

=== Cause of death ===
A debunked urban legend claimed O'Donnell was poisoned by Galway merchant James Blake. In 1602, Blake approached Lord President Carew with an offer to travel to Spain to assassinate O'Donnell. However, on 19 August at Valladolid he outlined a detailed plan to the Duke of Lerma for an anti-English military expedition. Historians Frederick M. Jones and Micheline Kerney Walsh speculate Blake was secretly a Spanish agent who proposed the mission to secure safe passage to Spain. After O'Donnell's death, Blake was arrested in Valladolid on suspicion of being an English spy, but despite extensive interrogation he was never suspected of poisoning O'Donnell. None of O'Donnell's companions (nor his physicians) suspected foul play; at the time, his companions credited his anguish over the diplomatic situation with causing his early death. Ultimately there is no evidence Blake assassinated O'Donnell. Historians dismiss this theory, and generally believe O'Donnell died of illness. Prior to his death he vomited a worm ten measures long. It was also reported "a kind of snake or serpent was found within him". This could indicate a tapeworm infection or a cancerous tumour.

=== End of the Nine Years' War ===
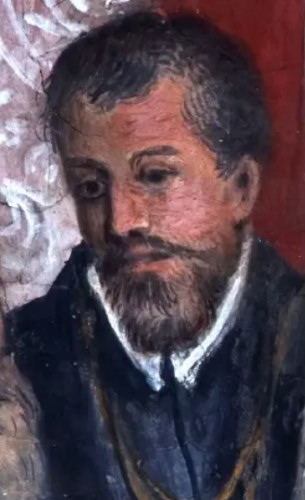
The English government recognised Rory O'Donnell (Hugh Roe O'Donnell's younger brother) as the successive ruler of Tyrconnell.

With O'Donnell's death, Spanish plans to send further assistance to the confederacy were abandoned. The Spanish Council of State ignored O'Donnell's request to withhold notice of his death, believing the confederates "should be undeceived, so that they may be able to make the best terms [with the English] they can, bad as the consequences may be".

Mountjoy sent Rory news of O'Donnell's death and stated "the war was at an end by his death". Rory convened a council of his advisors. The faction advocating for peace prevailed, though some of Hugh Roe O'Donnell's supporters still refused to believe he was dead. In December, Rory surrendered to Mountjoy at Athlone. Tyrone went into hiding for several months, but eventually surrendered by signing the Treaty of Mellifont on 30 March 1603, which ended the Nine Years' War. Furthermore, the Treaty of London in 1604 ended the Anglo-Spanish War. The historian John McCavitt stated "had [O'Donnell] lived... It could have changed the course of Irish history forever."

== Legacy ==
=== Succession ===
Hugh Roe O'Donnell was the last undisputed chief of the O'Donnell clan. Rory was created hereditary Earl of Tyrconnell by King James I and granted most of Tyrconnell's lands, but was required to give up his Gaelic titles and thus was never traditionally inaugurated as the O'Donnell clan chief. In his stead, Niall Garbh was inaugurated in April 1603. Niall Garbh and Rory subsequently engaged in land rights disputes up until Rory left Ireland permanently in the Flight of the Earls. Rory died of illness in 1608, and the following year Niall Garbh and his eldest son Naghtan were imprisoned in the Tower of London for life. Rory's only son, Hugh Albert O'Donnell, spent most of his life in continental Europe and died without children, making the subsequent line of succession unclear. With the end of the Gaelic order, no successor to the O'Donnell clan meaningfully exists. Today, family branches descended from the ruling O'Donnell clan live in Newport, Larkfield and Castlebar, as well as in Spain and Austria.

=== Historiography ===
==== Beatha Aodh Ruadh Ó Domhnaill ====
Hugh Roe O'Donnell was highly praised by seventeenth-century Irish chroniclers, as well as in Irish bardic poetry. Most notably, the Classical Gaelic biography Beatha Aodh Ruadh Ó Domhnaill (Irish: The Life of Red Hugh O'Donnell), written between 1616 and 1627 by Lughaidh Ó Cléirigh, is a highly important source about O'Donnell's life. Ó Cléirigh wrote Beatha to strengthen Spanish interest in Ireland during the Anglo-Spanish War (1625–1630). It is possible Ó Cléirigh attended O'Donnell's inauguration and military expeditions, and his description of O'Donnell's last days and funeral is based on eyewitness accounts. However, Ó Cléirigh altered historical facts to present O'Donnell more favorably, and he downplayed Tyrone's role in the war. As a result Beatha has distorted historical interpretation.

==== Gaelic Revival ====
Throughout the seventeenth and eighteenth centuries, Irish Catholic writers typically favoured O'Donnell over Tyrone. The dramatic content of O'Donnell's short life, which includes his escape from prison and his early overseas death, has enabled much mythologising of his character. His struggles against Tudor England, particularly his prison break, served as an allegory for Ireland's incarceration and spirit of resistance. During the nineteenth-century Gaelic revival, and into the early twentieth century, O'Donnell was embraced as a Celtic national hero, to the exclusion of Tyrone, whose "Machiavellian" nature and partially-English cultural identity were viewed as incompatible with Irish nationalism.

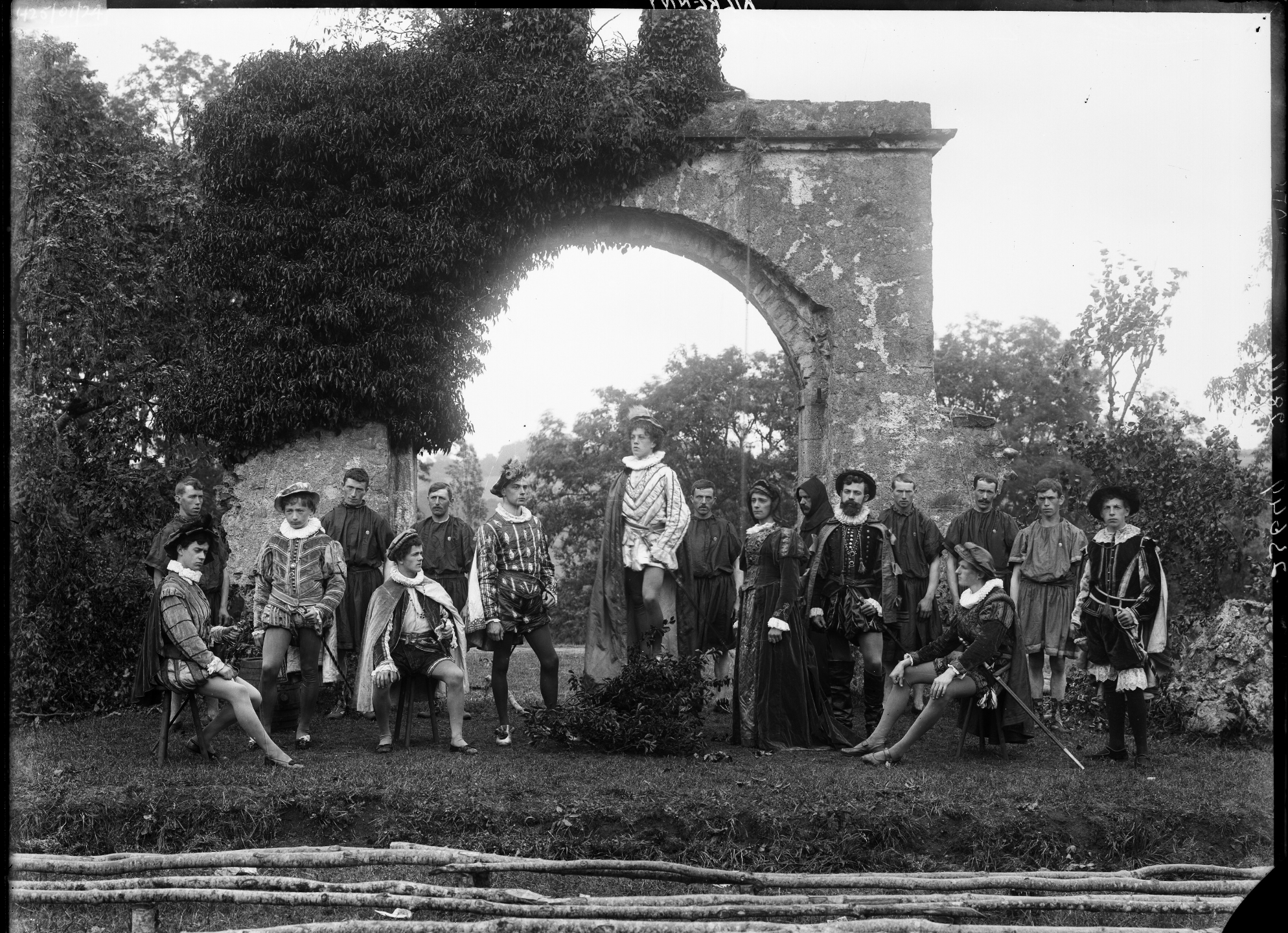
An acting troupe dressed for a 1902 performance of the masque Hugh Roe O'Donnell.

==== Modern reappraisal ====
Later historians such as James MacGeoghegan, John Mitchel, Seán Ó Faoláin and Hiram Morgan highlighted Tyrone's role in the confederacy. In most modern depictions of the Nine Years' War, O'Donnell is portrayed as the junior partner and thus his reputation has been overshadowed by Tyrone's.

The Aodh Ruadh Ó Domhnaill Guild was formed in 1977 to seek O'Donnell's cause for canonisation as a saint of the Catholic Church. The historian James Kelly stated that, in opposition to the image of O'Donnell as a Catholic martyr, O'Donnell was predominantly focused on affirming his clan's regional authority and dynastic aspirations. Kelly argued it was the Crown's expansion into O'Donnell's territory, rather than Catholic persecution, which constituted the major threat to his ambitions. Morgan considers O'Donnell to be "too Catholic and too violent for today's Ireland", and also calls O'Donnell "a counter-reformation Irish dynast living in the world of Machiavelli's Prince rather than the cattle-raid of Cooley".

=== Commemoration ===
==== Ireland ====
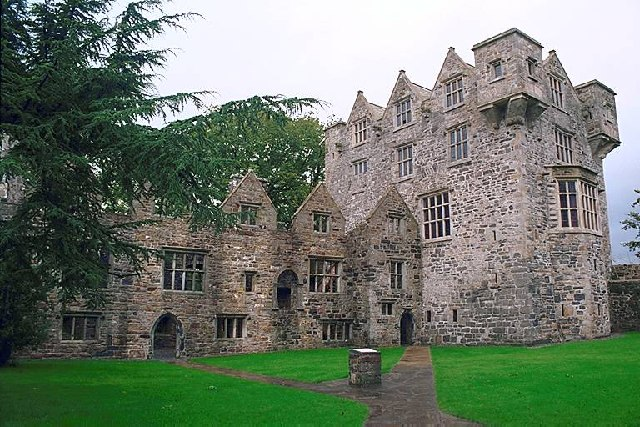
Donegal Castle (pictured in 1998) was one of O'Donnell's two major strongholds.

O'Donnell's birthday has been celebrated in County Donegal. O'Donnell and Art MacShane's prison escape is commemorated each January in the Art O'Neill Challenge, an ultramarathon endurance event in which participants retrace the same 55km journey from Dublin to Glenmalure on foot. A sculpture by Maurice Harron, titled The Gaelic Chieftain, was unveiled in 1999 near Boyle. Overlooking the N4, the sculpture depicts O'Donnell on horseback and commemorates his victory at the battle of Curlew Pass.

==== Continental Europe ====
O'Donnell was commemorated with a 17th-century inscription in San Pietro in Montorio, the Roman church where Rory, Caffar and Tyrone were buried. In 1991, a commemorative plaque was erected at the Castle of Simancas. As of 2023, plans are afoot to erect statues of O'Donnell in both Lifford and Simancas. The proposed twinning of the two towns was passed by the Donegal County Council in March 2024.

Since 2022, Valladolid has annually reenacted O'Donnell's funeral procession on the instigation of chairman of the Hispano-Irish Society, Carlos Burgos. The reenactors wear period costumes and carry an empty casket draped with an Irish tricolour. It is based on historical records of the real procession.

=== Search for remains ===
The Convent of St. Francis was later secularised and O'Donnell's body was disinterred; its current location is unknown. The Chapel of Wonders was sold and destroyed in 1836 during a wave of monastic expropriations, and its exact location was lost. In 2019, Donegal man Brendan Rohan visited Valladolid and persuaded city authorities to conduct a dig for O'Donnell's grave. The following year, a week-long excavation of Valladolid's Constitution Street revealed the walls of the Chapel of Wonders underneath a four-storey building. On 22 May 2020, archaeologists began a dig inside the chapel's remains. A number of modern descendants of O'Donnell's kin were "lined up for DNA tests" to confirm O'Donnell's identity if his remains were found. There was call for repatriation of O'Donnell's remains if discovered, even though O'Donnell himself asked to be buried in the Convent of St. Francis in his will. It was hoped his skeleton would be easy to identify due to his two missing big toes. However, many of the skeletons discovered were in a state of decay and did not have any existing feet. Eventually twenty skeletons were discovered during the dig, though DNA testing showed they were from an earlier period. The site has been used for burials for hundreds of years, making O'Donnell's discovery near-impossible.

In March 2021, archaeologists believed the Chapel of Wonders extended further beneath the dig site, and went into negotiations to resume the excavation. The search ended in October 2021. The media attention garnered by the dig has promoted Hispano-Irish relations.

== Character ==
[O'Donnell] was above middle height, strong, handsome, well-built and of pleasing appearance. His voice was musical. In action he was quick and decisive. He loved justice and was stern with evildoers. He was resolute, faithful to his word and steadfast in time of trial. Maintaining a rigorous military discipline, he led by example in battle. To all he was courteous and affable. He was not married. He was gracious, without pretension.

— Fr. Donagh O'Mooney

Described by Geoffrey Fenton as the "firebrand of all the rebels", Hugh Roe O'Donnell had an impulsive and bellicose personality. A 1590 bardic poet declared that O'Donnell was an arrogant youth whose imprisonment would help him cultivate values "appropriate to kingship". His four years in prison instilled within him a profound anti-English stance which shaped his aggressive military approach. O'Donnell was only anti-English on a political basis, as he willingly purchased English goods and firearms for his own purposes. He was described in 1601 as wearing English clothing and even going to mass in a "fine English gown", though equally he may have worn Spanish attire.

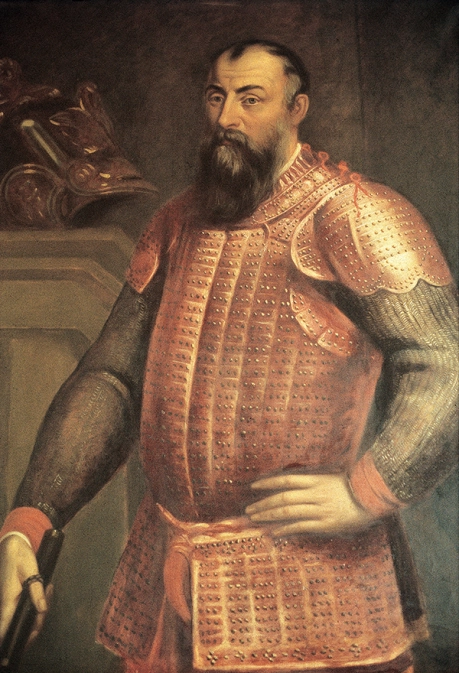
Mountjoy called Tyrone (pictured) and O'Donnell "the two vipers of the kingdom".

In contrast to his father-in-law Tyrone, who was known for bribing or elaborately bluffing his way out of trouble, O'Donnell preferred military solutions. The two men often clashed over their differing approaches but O'Donnell typically yielded to Tyrone's judgement. Despite O'Donnell's youth and brash attitude, within eighteen months of his inauguration he had radically changed the situation in West Ulster. His detailed notes on the Battle of Moyry Pass also show that he could develop somewhat complex battle plans. However, the pitfalls of his aggressive approach are evident—he lost over 100 confederate soldiers in an ill-fated 1597 assault on the Blackwater Fort. He also failed to anticipate Niall Garbh's betrayal and his poor foresight may have led to the defeat at Kinsale. Hiram Morgan described O'Donnell as a "gung-ho leader" whose military successes were limited.

Morwenna Donnelly notes that it is unusual that O'Donnell never remarried after his divorce from Rose. Excluding his rejected proposal to Joan FitzGerald, he appeared uninterested in securing an heir and was in no hurry to marry his bride-to-be Rose following his escape from Dublin. O'Donnell had no known mistresses or illegitimate children, in stark contrast with Tyrone's multiple wives, concubines and children. Donnelly suggests that O'Donnell remained single because he coveted Donnell Gorm's wife, Honora MacSweeney na dTuath (daughter of O'Donnell's foster-father). Another explanation comes from colleague Donagh O'Mooney; he stated that the devoutly Catholic O'Donnell sought to join the Franciscan clergy after the war, which would require clerical celibacy.

There are no surviving portraits or visual representations of Hugh Roe O'Donnell made in his lifetime. He presumably had red hair, as adjectives such as ruadh (Irish for red) were commonly employed in Irish names to refer to hair colour.

== Ancestry ==
Ancestors of Hugh Roe O'Donnell (Note: Hugh McManus O'Donnell's parents were Manus O'Donnell and Siobhán O'Neill. Fiona MacDonald's parents were James MacDonald, 6th of Dunnyveg, and Agnes Campbell. Manus O'Donnell's father was Hugh Dubh O'Donnell. Siobhán O'Neill's father was Conn Bacagh O'Neill, 1st Earl of Tyrone. James MacDonald's parents were Alexander Carragh MacDonnell, 5th of Dunnyveg, and Catherine MacDonald. Agnes Campbell's parents were Colin Campbell, 3rd Earl of Argyll and Jean Gordon.)

8. Hugh Dubh O'Donnell, Lord of Tyrconnell
4. Manus O'Donnell, Lord of Tyrconnell
2. Hugh McManus O'Donnell, Lord of Tyrconnell
10. Conn Bacagh O'Neill, 1st Earl of Tyrone
5. Siobhán O'Neill
1. Hugh Roe O'Donnell
12. Alexander Carragh MacDonnell, 5th of Dunnyveg
6. James MacDonald, 6th of Dunnyveg
13. Catherine MacDonald
3. Fiona MacDonald
14. Colin Campbell, 3rd Earl of Argyll
7. Agnes Campbell
15. Jean Gordon

== In popular culture ==
=== Poetry ===
Hugh Roe O'Donnell is referenced in the 19th-century poems Eirinn a' Gul by William Livingston, and Ceann Salla by James Clarence Mangan. Irish republican activist and revolutionary Patrick Pearse referenced O'Donnell in a poem which lists the Irish rebels that preceded him. Thomas MacGreevy's poem Aodh Ruadh Ó Domhnaill recounts the author's search for O'Donnell's grave during a visit to Spain in 1924.

=== Music ===
- Róisín Dubh, one of Ireland's most popular political songs, is addressed in O'Donnell's voice to his wife Rose.
- In 1843, the Young Irelander Michael Joseph MacCann wrote the poem O'Donnell Abú in tribute to O'Donnell.
- Hugh Roe O'Donnell is the subject of the ballad If These Stones Could Speak, as featured on the Phil Coulter album Highland Cathedral.
- For the Seville Expo '92, composer Bill Whelan composed The Seville Suite to commemorate the 390th anniversary of O'Donnell's arrival in Galicia. The suite was commissioned by the Taoiseach's office and was performed by a 50-piece orchestra at the Teatro de la Maestranza on 4 October 1992.

Peter McEnery portrayed O'Donnell in The Fighting Prince of Donegal (1966).

=== Novels ===
Novels based on O'Donnell's life (particularly centred on his escape from Dublin Castle) include The Flight of the Eagle (Standish James O'Grady, 1897), O'Donel of Destiny (Mary Kiely, 1939), Red Hugh, Prince of Donegal (Robert T Reilly, 1957) and Red Hugh: The Kidnap of Hugh O'Donnell (Deborah Lisson, 1999).

=== Screen ===
English actor Peter McEnery portrayed Hugh O'Donnell in the 1966 Disney adventure film The Fighting Prince of Donegal, which was based on Robert T. Reilly's 1957 book. Dominic Moore portrayed O'Donnell in the 2001 RTÉ docudrama The Battle of Kinsale.

=== Theatre ===
- On 15 August 1902 in Kilkenny, Captain Otway Cuffe staged a single performance of a masque (titled Hugh Roe O'Donnell) recounting O'Donnell's kidnapping, escape and inauguration. The masque was authored by Standish James O'Grady, produced by Francis Joseph Bigger, and performed by the Neophytes, a north Belfast theatre troupe. It was well-received and formed part of the Gaelic revival movement.
- O'Donnell is a major character in Brian Friel's 1988 historical play Making History, which focuses on Tyrone reckoning with his own legacy. Peter Gowen portrayed O'Donnell in the original production by Field Day.

=== Other ===
- Several Gaelic sports clubs in County Donegal are named after O'Donnell, such as Aodh Ruadh CLG in Ballyshannon and Red Hughs GAA Club in Killygordon.

== Bibliography ==
=== Primary sources ===
- Annals of the Four Masters. CELT: Corpus of Electronic Texts. 2008 [1636].
- Mahaffy, Robert Pentland, ed. (1912). Calendar of the State Papers relating to Ireland, 1601-03. His Majesty's Stationery Office.
- Meehan, Charles Patrick (1870). The Rise and Fall of the Irish Franciscan Monasteries, and Memoirs of the Irish Hierarchy in the Seventeenth Century (3rd ed.). Dublin: J. Duffy.
- O'Clery, Lughaidh; O'Clery, Cucogry; Murphy, Denis (1895). Beatha Aodha Ruaidh ui Dhomhnaill. The life of Hugh Roe O'Donnell, prince of Tirconnell (1586-1602). Digitized by the Internet Archive in 2013. Dublin: Fallon & Co.
- O'Sullivan Beare, Philip (1903) [1621]. Chapters towards a History of Ireland in the reign of Elizabeth. Translated by Byrne, Matthew J. CELT: Corpus of Electronic Texts. Archived from the original on 10 March 2024.

=== Secondary sources ===
- Breatnach, Pádraig A. (1986). "An Address to Aodh Ruadh Ó Domhnaill in Captivity, 1590". Irish Historical Studies. 25 (98): 198–213. doi:10.1017/S0021121400026493. ISSN 0021-1214. JSTOR 30008529.
- Canny, Nicholas (7 June 2022). "Hugh O'Neill in Irish historical discourse, c.1550–2021". Irish Historical Studies. 46 (169): 25–51. doi:10.1017/ihs.2022.2. ISSN 0021-1214.
- Casway, Jerrold (2016). "Catherine Magennis and the Wives of Hugh O'Neill". Seanchas Ardmhacha: Journal of the Armagh Diocesan Historical Society. 26 (1): 69–79. JSTOR 48568219.
- Clavin, Terry (October 2009). "O'Donnell, Sir Niall Garvach". Dictionary of Irish Biography. doi:10.3318/dib.006345.v1. Archived from the original on 3 January 2024.
- Donnelly, Morwenna (1986). "Red Hugh and Rose O'Neill". Donegal Annual (38): 46–51.
- Ekin, Des (2015). The Last Armada: Queen Elizabeth, Juan del Aguila, and Hugh O'Neill: The Story of the 100-Day Spanish Invasion. Pegasus Books. ISBN 978-1-60598-944-0.
- Jones, Frederick M. (1950). "James Blake and a Projected Spanish Invasion of Galway in 1602". Journal of the Galway Archaeological and Historical Society. 24 (1/2): 1–18. ISSN 0332-415X. JSTOR 25535325.
- Jones, Frederick M. (1951). "James Blake of Galway and the death of Red Hugh O'Donnell". The Irish Ecclesiastical Record (75): 30–38.
- Kelly, James (2004). "Review of Red Hugh O'Donnell and the Nine Years War". Studia Hibernica (33): 160–162. ISSN 0081-6477. JSTOR 20495169.
- Kerney Walsh, Micheline (1990). "Archbishop Magauran and His Return to Ireland, October 1592". Seanchas Ardmhacha: Journal of the Armagh Diocesan Historical Society. 14 (1): 68–79. doi:10.2307/29742439. ISSN 0488-0196. JSTOR 29742439.
- Kerney Walsh, Micheline (1996). An exile of Ireland, Hugh O'Neill, Prince of Ulster. Dublin: Four Courts Press. ISBN 978-1-85182-234-8.
- McCormack, Anthony M.; Clavin, Terry (October 2009). "O'Neill, Art". Dictionary of Irish Biography. doi:10.3318/dib.006915.v1. Archived from the original on 13 May 2024.
- McGettigan, Darren (2005). Red Hugh O'Donnell and the Nine Years War. Dublin: Four Courts Press. ISBN 978-1-8518-2887-6. OL 11952048M.
- McGinty, Matthew (August 2013), The Development and Dynamics of the Relationship between Hugh O'Neill and Red Hugh O'Donnell, pp. 1–69
- McGinty, Matthew (29 November 2024). "Red Hugh O'Donnell, Niall Garbh O'Donnell and the Siege of Donegal Abbey". Tales from Early Modern Ireland.
- McGreevy, Ronan (24 May 2020). "Archaeologists are 'quite sure' they have found Red Hugh O'Donnell's burial place". The Irish Times.
- McGurk, John (2001). "The Battle of Kinsale, 1601". History Ireland. 9 (3): 16–21. JSTOR 27724898.
- McGurk, John (2006). Sir Henry Docwra, 1564–1631: Derry's Second Founder. Four Courts Press. ISBN 1-85182-948-2.
- McGurk, John (February 2008). "Flight of the Earls Special Issue". History Ireland. 16 (1): 7–8. ISSN 0791-8224. JSTOR 27725724.
- Mitchell, Angus (2024). "Hugh Roe O'Donnell: The Great Kilkenny Masque of August 1902". Old Kilkenny Review. 75: 71–89.
- Morgan, Hiram (1993). Tyrone's Rebellion: The outbreak of the Nine Years' War in Tudor Ireland. London: The Boydell Press. ISBN 0-85115-683-5.
- Morgan, Hiram (2002). Ó Riain, Pádraig (ed.). "The Real Red Hugh". Irish Texts Society (12). Published through academia.edu. London: 1–17.
- Morgan, Hiram (2004). "'Never Any Realm Worse Governed': Queen Elizabeth and Ireland". Transactions of the Royal Historical Society. 14: 295–308. doi:10.1017/S0080440104000179. ISSN 0080-4401. JSTOR 3679322.
- Morgan, Hiram (June 2007). "Review of Red Hugh O'Donnell and the Nine Years War; Sir Henry Docwra, 1564-1631: Derry's Second Founder". The English Historical Review. 122 (497): 823–824. doi:10.1093/ehr/cem144. ISSN 0013-8266. JSTOR 4493950.
- Morgan, Hiram (October 2009). "O'Donnell, 'Red' Hugh (Ó Domhnaill, Aodh Ruadh)". Dictionary of Irish Biography. doi:10.3318/dib.006343.v1.
- Morgan, Hiram (2013). Peduelo Martin, Eduardo; Rodriguez de Diego, Julia (eds.). "The establishment of the Irish-Spanish relationship" (PDF). Los Irlandeses y la Monarquia Hispanica (1529-1800): Vinculos in Espacio y Tiempo. Madrid: 1–10. Archived (PDF) from the original on 25 May 2024.
- Morgan, Hiram (September 2014). "O'Neill, Hugh". Dictionary of Irish Biography. doi:10.3318/dib.006962.v1. Archived from the original on 26 September 2023.
- Morgan, Hiram (2 June 2020). "Red Hugh hunt shines light on gung-ho hero". Irish Independent.
- O'Byrne, Emmett (October 2009a). "MacDonnell (Nic Dhomhnaill), Fiona (Fionnghuala) ('Iníon Dubh')". Dictionary of Irish Biography. doi:10.3318/dib.006337.v1. Archived from the original on 18 April 2024.
- O'Byrne, Emmett (October 2009b). "O'Donnell (Ó Domhnaill), Sir Aodh mac Maghnusa". Dictionary of Irish Biography. doi:10.3318/dib.006332.v1. Archived from the original on 31 March 2022.
- Ó Canann, Tomás G. (2007). "Ó Domhnaill's inauguration, according to Pilib Ó Súilleabháin Bhéarra". The Journal of the Royal Society of Antiquaries of Ireland. 137: 101–116. ISSN 0035-9106. JSTOR 23024262.
- O'Donnell, Eunan (2006). "Reflection on the Flight of the Earls". Donegal Annual. 58: 31–44.
- O'Donnell, Francis Martin (2018). The O'Donnells of Tyrconnell: A Hidden Legacy. Academica Press. ISBN 978-1-68053-474-0.
- O'Donnell, Francis Martin (4 June 2020a). "We should avoid being 'holier than Pope' about Red Hugh". Irish Independent.
- O'Neill, James (2017). The Nine Years War, 1593-1603: O'Neill, Mountjoy and the Military Revolution. Dublin: Four Courts Press. ISBN 978-1-84682-754-9.
- Power, Gerald (2010). "Darren McGettigan, Red Hugh O'Donnell and the Nine Years War". Peritia. 21: 382–384. doi:10.1484/J.PERIT.1.102404. ISSN 0332-1592.
- Purcell, Mary (1966). "Red Hugh O'Donnell". The Furrow. 17 (4): 255–257. ISSN 0016-3120. JSTOR 27659140.
- Silke, John J. (1988). "The Last Will of Red Hugh O'Donnell". Studia Hibernica (24): 51–60. doi:10.3828/sh.1988.24.3. ISSN 0081-6477. JSTOR 20496218.
- Silke, John J. (23 September 2004). "O'Donnell, Hugh [Aodh Ó'Dónaill; known as Red Hugh, Hugh Roe, Aodh Rua], lord of Tyrconnell (1572–1602), chieftain and rebel". Oxford Dictionary of National Biography (online ed.). Oxford University Press. doi:10.1093/ref:odnb/20554. Archived from the original on 4 March 2025. (Subscription, Wikipedia Library access or UK public library membership required.)
- Walsh, Paul (1922). "Hugh Roe O'Donnell's Sisters". The Irish Ecclesiastical Record. XIX. Dublin: 358–364.
- Walsh, Paul, ed. (1930). The Will and Family of Hugh O'Neill, Earl of Tyrone [with an Appendix of Genealogies]. Dublin: Sign of the Three Candles.
- Walsh, Paul (1939). "Historical Criticism of the Life of Hugh Roe O'Donnell". Irish Historical Studies. 1 (3): 229–250. doi:10.1017/S0021121400030819. ISSN 0021-1214. JSTOR 30005953.

== See also ==
- O'Donnell dynasty
- Irish kings
- Tyrconnell
- County Donegal
- Kings of Tir Connaill
- Early Modern Ireland 1536-1691
- Nine Years' War (Ireland)

Hugh Roe O'Donnell O'Donnell clan
Regnal titles
Preceded by Hugh McManus O'Donnell	Lord of Tyrconnell; 1592–1602	Succeeded by Rory O'Donnell
