= Maximilian Karl Lamoral O'Donnell =

Austrian officer

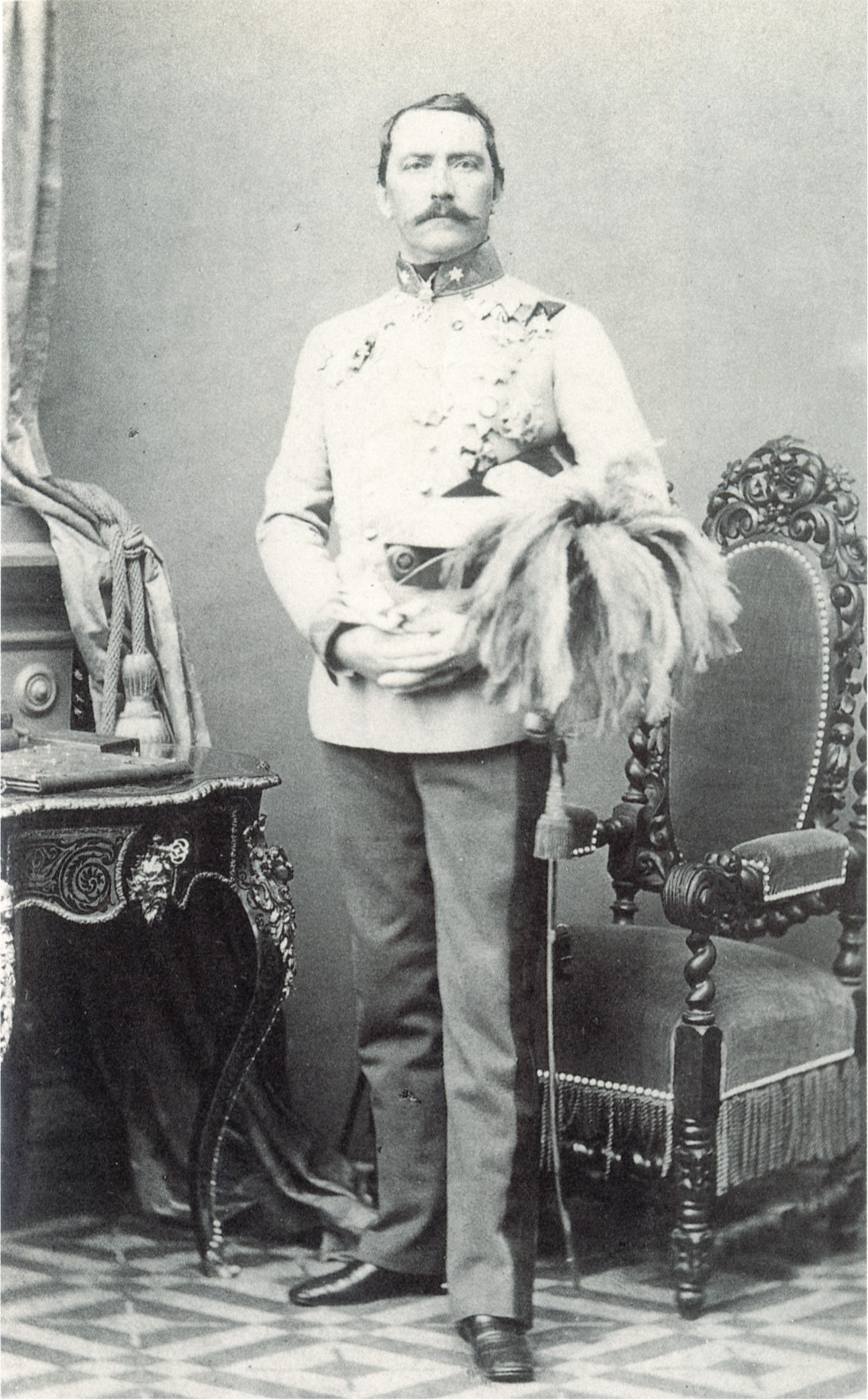
- Maximilian Karl Lamoral O'Donnell in 1860
- Born: 29 October 1812; Goldegg, Kingdom of Bavaria
- Died: 14 July 1895 (aged 82); Salzburg, Austria-Hungary
- Noble family: O'Donnell
- Spouse: Franziska Wagner
- Father: Maurice O'Donnell

Maximilian Karl Lamoral Graf O'Donnell von Tyrconnell (29 October 1812 — 14 July 1895) was an Austrian officer and civil servant who became famous when he helped save the life of Emperor Franz Josef I of Austria. O'Donnell was a descendant of the Irish noble dynasty of O'Donnell of Tyrconnell.

== Family background ==
He was born in Goldegg, son of Count Maurice O'Donnell (Moritz Graf O'Donnell) (1780–1843), the 7th generation descendant of Conn Oge O'Donnell, and Christine (4 January 1788 – 19 May 1867), the legitimate daughter of Charles Joseph, Prince de Ligne. He married Franziska Wagner, who was not of noble birth, and the marriage was frowned upon. He died in his home in Salzburg and is buried in the Salzburg Cemetery.

== Military career ==
He was educated in Dresden, then joined the military and served in several engagements in Europe, including in Italy in 1848, and Hungary in 1849, resulting in many awards and promotions. He became aide-de-camp to the Emperor Franz Josef I of Austria. He later served as Governor of Lombardy briefly from 18–22 March 1848.

== Fame as life-saver ==
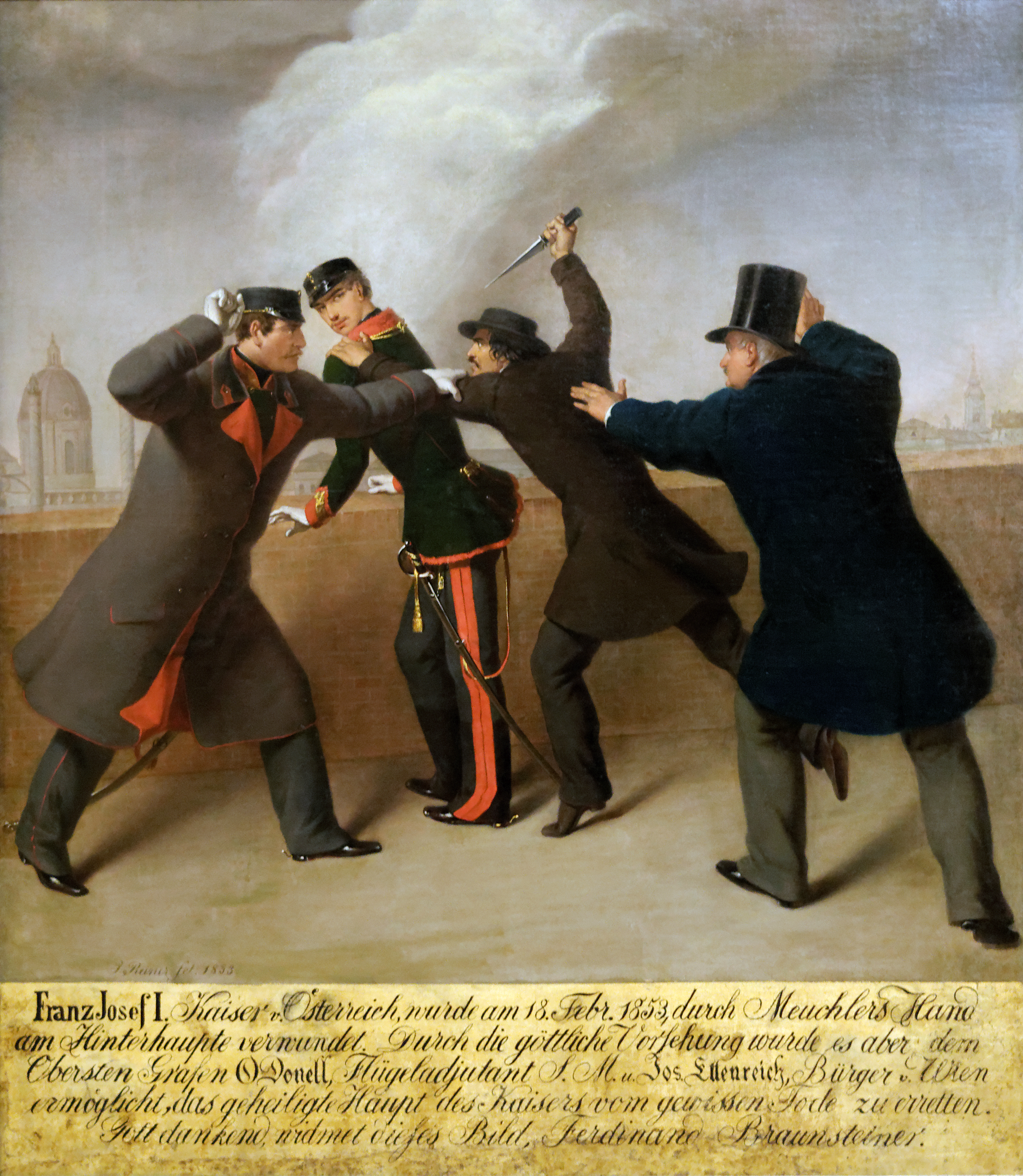
The attempt on Franz Joseph I, painted by J.Reiner. O'Donnell is on the left.

On 18 February 1853, Maximilian helped save the life of the young Emperor, foiling an assassination attempt by a tailor and former Hussar, János Libényi, a Hungarian nationalist. The Emperor was taking a stroll with Count Maximilian O'Donnell on a bastion inside Vienna. About 1 pm, as he looked over a parapet to review an exercise of troops, Libényi approached and struck the Emperor in the neck from behind with a knife. Even though the Emperor was wounded and bleeding, his collar may have helped save his life. Maximilian Graf O'Donnell struck Libényi down with his sabre. Another witness who happened to be nearby, the butcher Joseph Ettenreich, quickly overwhelmed Libényi. For this deed, he was later elevated to nobility by the Emperor and became Joseph von Ettenreich. Libényi was subsequently put on trial and condemned to death for attempted regicide. He was executed near the Spinnerin am Kreuz in the Favoriten district.

After the unsuccessful attack the Emperor's brother Archduke Ferdinand Maximilian Joseph, the later Emperor of Mexico, called upon the royal families of Europe for donations to construct a new church on the site of the attack. The church was to be a votive offering for the rescue of the Emperor. It is located on Ringstraße in the district of Alsergrund close to the University of Vienna, and is known as the Votivkirche.

== Titles, honours and awards ==
Maximilian Karl Lamoral Graf O'Donnell von Tyrconnell (portrait by Prinzhofer, 1853)

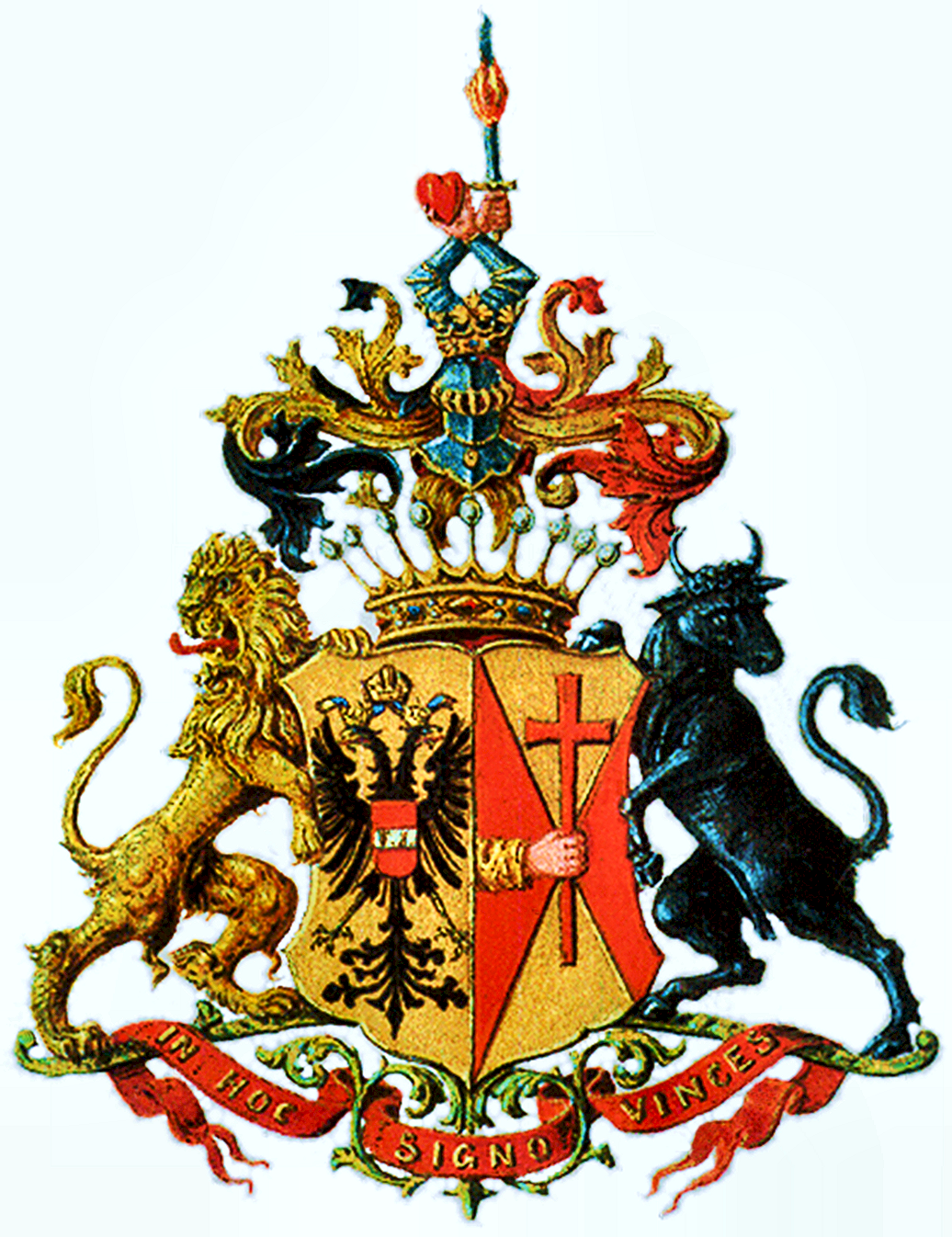
Maximilian Karl Lamoral Graf O'Donell von Tyrconnell coat of arms

=== Titles ===
Maximilian O'Donnell already held a German Habsburg title of Count, granted to his great-grandfather. (Note: Maximilian's great-grandfather was Major General Count Henry O'Donnell (1726-1789), Commander of the O'Donnell No. 5 Cuirassier Regiment, who married Princess Leopoldine Cantacuzino, a descendant of the Byzantine Emperors through the Russian branch of the Moldavian Cantacuzinos, in Pressburg (Bratislava).) However, after successfully rescuing the Emperor, he was additionally honoured and made a Count of the Habsburg Austrian Empire (Reichsgraf), but an error occurred in the Letters Patent, omitting one "n" from the family name, and the Austrian O'Donnells have since then usually used "O'Donell" as the standard version.

=== Orders and decorations ===
- Austrian Empire:
  - Commander of the Imperial Order of Leopold, 1853
  - Military Merit Cross
  - Knight of Justice of the Order of Saint John of Jerusalem
- Ascanian duchies: Commander of the House Order of Albert the Bear, 2nd Class, 30 October 1852
- Baden: Commander of the Order of the Zähringer Lion, 1st Class, 1852
- Kingdom of Bavaria:
  - Commander of the Merit Order of Saint Michael, 1850
  - Commander of the Order of Merit of the Bavarian Crown, 1853
- Belgium: Commander of the Order of Leopold
- Empire of Brazil: Commander of the Order of the Southern Cross, with Star
- (Saxe-Coburg and Gotha) (Duchy of Saxe-Altenburg) (Saxe-Meiningen) Ernestine duchies: Commander of the Saxe-Ernestine House Order, 1st Class, February 1853
- French Empire: Commander of the Legion of Honour
- Kingdom of Greece: Commander of the Order of the Redeemer
- Kingdom of Hanover: Commander of the Royal Guelphic Order, 2nd Class, 1853
- Electorate of Hesse: Commander of the Wilhelmsorden, 2nd Class, 26 November 1851
- Grand Duchy of Hesse: Commander of the Ludwig Order, 1st Class, 18 August 1853
- Holy See: Knight of the Supreme Order of Christ
- Duchy of Parma: Commander of the Sacred Military Constantinian Order of Saint George, 1852
- Kingdom of Portugal:
  - Commander of the Royal Military Order of Saint Benedict of Aviz
  - Commander of the Royal Military Order of the Tower and Sword
- Kingdom of Prussia:
  - Knight of the Order of the Red Eagle, 2nd Class, 12 December 1852
  - Commander's Cross of the Royal House Order of Hohenzollern, 8 March 1853
- Russian Empire:
  - Knight of the Order of Saint Stanislaus, 1st Class with Star
  - Knight of the Order of Saint Vladimir, 3rd Class
  - Knight of the Order of Saint Anna, 2nd Class in Diamonds
- Kingdom of Saxony:
  - Knight of the Saxon Order of Merit, 1849
  - Commander of the Albert Order, 1st Class, 1853
- Spain: Commander of the Order of Charles III, with Star
- Grand Duchy of Tuscany:
  - Commander of the Order of Saint Joseph
  - Knight of the Military Order of Saint Stephen
- Two Sicilies: Commander of the Order of Saint George of the Reunion

=== Honours ===
- Freeman of the cities of Vienna, Prague, Pest, Laibach (Ljubljana), and others.

=== Arms ===
His customary O'Donnell arms were augmented by the initials of Emperor Franz Joseph within the shield of the archducal House of Austria in the inescutcheon of the double-headed eagle of the Empire. These arms can still be seen emblazoned on the portico of no. 2 Mirabellplatz in Salzburg, where O'Donnell built his residence thereafter in the former gardens of Schloss Mirabell.

== Descent from Niall of the Nine Hostages ==
There is evidence that he is descended from Niall of the Nine Hostages

- Maximilian Karl Lamoral O'Donnell
- Maurice Count O'Donnell
- Joseph Count O'Donnell
- Major-General Henry Count O'Donnell
- Calbhach Dubh O'Donnell, of Oldcastle
- Colonel Calbhach Ruadh O'Donnell
- Colonel Manus O'Donnell
- Conn Oge O'Donnell
- Conn O'Donnell
- Calvagh O'Donnell, King of Tír Chonaill
- Manus O'Donnell, King of Tír Chonaill
- Hugh Dubh O'Donnell, King of Tír Chonaill
- Hugh Ruadh O'Donnell, King of Tír Chonaill
- Niall Garbh O'Donnell, King of Tír Chonaill
- Turlough an Fiona O'Donnell, King of Tír Chonaill
- Niall Garbh O'Donnell, King of Tír Chonaill
- Hugh O'Donnell, King of Tír Chonaill
- Domhnall Óg Ó Domhnaill, King of Tír Chonaill
- Donal Mór O'Donnell, King of Tír Chonaill
- Eignechan O'Donnell, King of Tír Chonaill
- Donnchadh O'Donnell
- Donal O'Donnell
- Hugh O'Donnell
- Tadg O'Donnell
- Conn O'Donnell
- Cathbharr O'Donnell
- Giollachriosd O'Donnell
- Cathbharr
- Domhnaill
- Eignechan
- Dálach
- Muirchertach
- Ceannfola
- Arnall
- Maolduin
- Ceannfola
- Garbh
- Ronan
- Lughach
- Fergus
- Seadnach
- Fergus Ceanfada
- Conall Gulban
- Niall of the Nine Hostages, High King of Ireland
