= O'Donnell dynasty =

Irish clan

O'Donnell
- Arms of O'Donnell
- Parent house: Northern Uí Néill
- Country: Kingdom of Tyrconnell
- Founded: 13th (5th) century
- Founder: Conall Gulban
- Final ruler: Ruaidrí, 1st Earl of Tyrconnell, An Ó Domhnaill
- Historic seat: Donegal Castle
- Titles: Cenél Conaill: Kings of Tara; High Kings of Ireland; Kings of Tyrconnell; Protectors of Dál Riata; O'Donnell: Kings of Tyrconnell; King of Leth Cuinn; Prince of Durlass (Thurles); Lord of Lower Connacht; International titles: Prince of Tyrconnell; Earl of Tyrconnell; Duke of Tetuán; Marquisate of Altamira; Comte O'Donnell; Count of Lucena; Count of La Bisbal; Count O'Donell von Tyrconell; Viscount of Aliaga; Lord of Fingal; Baron of Donegal; Baron of Lifford; O'Donnell baronets
- Cadet branches: O'Donnell von Tyrconnell

The O'Donnell dynasty (Irish: Ó Dónaill or Ó Domhnaill, Ó Doṁnaill or Ua Domaill; meaning "descendant of Dónal") were the dominant Irish clan of the kingdom of Tyrconnell in Ulster in the north of medieval and early modern Ireland.

== Naming conventions ==
Male	Daughter	Wife (Long)	Wife (Short)
Ó Domhnaill	Ní Dhomhnaill	Bean Uí Dhomhnaill	Uí Dhomhnaill
Ó Dónaill	Ní Dhónaill	Bean Uí Dhónaill	Uí Dhónaill

== Origins ==
Like the family of O'Neill, that of O'Donnell of Tyrconnell was of the Uí Néill, i.e. descended from Niall of the Nine Hostages, High King of Ireland at the beginning of the 5th century; the O'Neill, or Cenél nEógain, tracing their pedigree to Eógan mac Néill, and the O'Donnells, or Cenél Conaill, to Conall Gulban, both sons of Niall. Conall was baptised by St. Patrick.

== Arms and motto ==
The Roman Emperor Constantine the Great converted to Christianity after a vision before the famous Battle of the Milvian Bridge, having seen a chi-rho in the sky, and thence the motto In Hoc Signo Vinces, telling him he would be victorious with the sign of the cross. The chi-rho was adopted on a banner, the labarum, upheld on a vexillum, which resembled a Christian cross, and in time the motto became associated with the Cross all over Europe. Legend has it that St. Patrick struck the shield of Conall, son of King Niall of the Nine Hostages, with his crosier, called Bachal Isu (the staff of Jesus) inscribing thereon a sign of the cross and told him the same, and baptized him. According to the Life and Acts of Saint Patrick (chapter 138), commissioned by Sir John de Courcy and written by Jocelyn of Furness (c. 1185 AD), St. Patrick took his staff, known as the staff of Jesus, or Bacall Iosa, and struck the shield of Prince Conall, rendering a sign of the Cross on it, “et mox cum baculo suo, qui baculus Jesu dicebatur Crucis signum ejus scuto impressit, asserens neminem de stirpe ejus in bello vincendum qui signum illud”, and thus indicating that he and his offspring would henceforth be victorious in battle if they followed that sign This legend is also described several centuries later in the Lebhar Inghine i Dhomhnaill. His land became Tír Chonaill, Tyrconnell, the land of Conall.

Conall's Constantinian shield, and this motto, have been the main O’Donnell arms in various forms, through the centuries. The motto also appears prominently placed as a motto on a ribbon unfurled with a passion cross to its left, beneath a window over the Scala Regia, adjacent to Bernini's equestrian statue of Emperor Constantine, in the Vatican. Emperors and other monarchs, having paid respects to the Pope, descended the Scala Regia, and would observe the light shining down through the window, with the motto, reminiscent of Constantine's vision, and be reminded to follow the Cross. They would thence turn right into the atrium of St. Peter's Basilica, ostensibly so inspired. In an earlier version (before Bernini's renovations in the mid-17th century), something similar may have resonated with and been observed by Prince Rory O'Donnell, 1st Earl of Tyrconnell following his visit to Pope Paul V (at the Palazzo Quirinale) in Rome, just prior to his death in 1608. It would certainly have resonated with and been observed by Cardinal Patrick O'Donnell.

== Territory ==
Tyrconnell, the territory named after the Cenel Conaill, is the vast territory where the O'Donnells held sway, comprised the greater part of the modern county of Donegal except the peninsula of Inishowen. But it also included areas outside Donegal, such as the baronies of Carbury in County Sligo, Rosclogher in County Leitrim, and Magheraboy and Firlurg in County Fermanagh, and part of southern County Londonderry, hence it straddled the modern Republic of Ireland and also part of Northern Ireland in the UK. The jewel in the O'Donnell crown was Donegal Castle, one of seven O'Donnell castles, and now a national monument restored in the 1990s. Tyrconnell also, therefore, bordered on territory ruled by the O'Neills of Tyrone, who were periodically attempting to assert their claim of supremacy over it, and hence the history of the O'Donnells is, for the most part, a record of clan warfare with their powerful neighbours, and of their own efforts to make good their claims to the overlordship of northern Connacht, and a wider swathe of Ulster. Nonetheless, Tyrconnell existed for a period as an independent kingdom, recognised by King Henry III of England.

== Ascendancy ==
Gofraidh Ó Domhnaill, the first chieftain, was son of Domhnall Mór Ó Domhnaill. In 1257, Gofraidh was victorious when he went to battle at Creadran-Cille against Maurice FitzGerald. Upon Gofraidh's death, subsequent to wounds incurred during the battle against Ó Néill, he was succeeded in the chieftainship by his brother Domhnall Óg, who returned from Scotland in time to withstand successfully the demands of Ó Néill. Over time, the O'Donnell King of Tyrconnell became known as the Fisher-King, on the Continent, ostensibly due to the export of fish traded for wine in La Rochelle.

== Patronage by the O'Donnell dynasty ==
The O'Donnells were patrons of the arts, literature, and of religious benefices. In particular, one, Manus, wrote the biography of ColmCille (St. Columba). They also were the patrons of the Franciscans in Donegal Abbey. They also exercised "jus patronus" to nominate bishops.

In the early 14th century A.D., the O'Donnell rulers aided Templar knights fleeing via Sligo and Tyrconnell to Scotland where a Templar priory existed at Ballymote , a Percival family estate for the last 300 years. The Stewarts relied on the O'Donnells in the balance of power with the MacDonalds beginning in the fourteenth century.

The O’Donnell rulers of Tyrconnell are also noted for having in the late 12th century given sanctuary to the Donlevy dynasty of Ulaid (Ulster), after their kingdom had fallen to John de Courcy in 1177. It is in Tyrconnell that a branch of the Donlevy's became known as the MacNulty's, deriving from the Irish Mac an Ultaigh, meaning "son of the Ulsterman", in reference to their former kingdom of Ulaid. During the Donlevy exile in Tyrconnell, The O’Donnell gave them the high Gaelic status of “ollahm leighis” or his official physicians.

It was in fact two of these deposed MacDonlevy (> MacNulty) royals and Roman Catholic priests thereto exiled in Tyrconnell, Fathers Muiris Ulltach in full Muiris mac Donnchadh Ulltach Ó Duinnshléibhe and Muiris Ulltach in full Muiris mac Seaán Ulltach Ó Duinnshléibhe, who both along with the Archbishop of Tuam attended Hugh Roe O'Donnell (aka Red Hugh O’Donnell), The O'Donnell of 1601 Kinsale fame, in his exile at his death bed at Simancas Castle in Spain in 1602. And, it was, in turn, an Irish Count O’Donnell, who compassionately married the widow (d. 1708) of Don-Levi, a Jacobite (Jacobitism) and, thereby, on James II of England's and his French allied's failure to reclaim his British crowns, the last The MacDonlevy to sit in Ireland (departed 1691), after this prince died in exile with the Stuarts in France at the Archbishopric of Treves. This union of the MacDonlevy and the O'Donnell, though, bore no issue.

In the absence of these indulgences of the O’Donnell dynasty kings having maintained the MacDonlevy and MacNulty physicians as a dignified community, it is debatable whether they could have so influenced the course of western medicine, educating and training Niall Ó Glacáin (L. Nellanus Glacanus) in the medical arts, so he could later on the Continent apply empirical method to pioneer the field of forensic anatomy and pathology, first describe the petechial haemorrhages of the lung and swelling of the spleen incident of bubonic plague (Tractatus de Peste, 1629), and early elucidate the empirical method of differential diagnosis for the continental European medical community, and producing the medieval physician and medical scholar Cormac MacDonlevy translator from Latin to vernacular of Bernard de Gordon's Lilium Medicine, Gaulteris Agilon's De dosibus and Gui de Chuliac's Chirurgia.

Later in the early 13th century, the O’Donnell also gave succour to the Ó Cléirigh kings of Uí Fiachrach Aidhne. Onara Ultach was descended from the MacDonlevy (dynasty) royals of Ulidia (kingdom), who as above noted after the fall of that Ulster kingdom to the Anglo-Norman forces of Henry Plantagenet served as ollam lieghis or the official physicians to the O'Donnell kings of Tyrconnell. Onara married Donnchadh Ó Cléirigh, a son of the Chief of the name of the Ó Cléirigh family then also of Tyconnell. The Ó Cléirigh were too a learned Irish royal family that had lost their sub-kingdom in Uí Fiachrach Aidhne in what is today County Galway to the Anglo-Norman forces of Henry Plantagenet. The Ó Cléirigh then went into service of the O’Donnell as poet historians, scribes and secretaries or official bards, called in Irish language "ollam righ". Onara bore for Donnchadh a son Mícheál Ó Cléirigh (c. 1590 – 1643), anglicized Michael O’Cleary, who matured to become the principal author of the Annals of the Four Masters. But for the manifold grace of the O’Donnell, this union would never have occurred, and Michael O’Cleary never lived to memorialize this history of Gaelic Ireland.

== Royal Household ==
The Royal Household was known in Gaelic as "Lucht Tighe" and comprised several offices that were performed on a hereditary basis by the heads and members of particular other families, for over four centuries.

- Lector & Inaugurator of the Chieftaincy - O'Friel (Ó Frighil)
- Gallowglass Marshalls & Standard - Bearers - McSweeney (Mac Suibhne)
- Commanders of Cavalry - O'Gallagher (Ó Gallchobhair)
- Custodians of the Cathach of St. Columba - Roarty (Mac Robhartaigh)
- Historians and Scribes - O'Clery (Ó Cléirigh), formerly kings of Uí Fiachrach Aidhne
- Brehons or Judges - Breslin (Ó Breaslain)
- Bards & Poets - Ward (Mac an Bhaird)
- Physicians - Donleavy (Mac Duinnshléibhe), formerly Kings of Ulster (Dál Fiatach of Ulaid)
- Herenagh of church lands/Custodians of Donegal Castle & Ballyshannon Castle - McMenamin (Mac Meanman)
- Stockmen/Cattle Drivers - Timoney (Ó Tiománaigh)

== Later struggles and diaspora ==
The O'Donnells defeated the O'Neills in the 1522 Battle of Knockavoe. In 1541 Manus O'Donnell took part in the "Surrender and regrant" process. In 1567 the O'Donnells won the Battle of Farsetmore against the O'Neills, reconfirming their autonomy in Ulster.

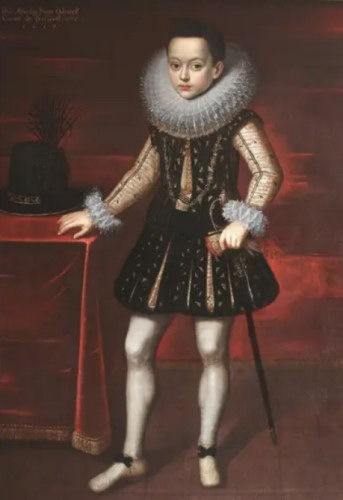
Hugh Albert O’Donnell (later 2nd Earl of Tyrconnell), at 10 years of age as a page at the court of Albert VII, Archduke of Austria.

During the Nine Years' War of 1593-1603, the O'Donnells of Tyrconnell played a leading part, led by the famous Prince Red Hugh O'Donnell. Under his leadership, and that of his ally Hugh O'Neill, they advanced to Kinsale and laid siege to the English forces in anticipation of a Spanish invasion. En route, they implanted some O'Donnell kinsmen in Ardfert and Lixnaw to protect the territories of their ally, FitzMaurice, Lord of Kerry. The Battle of Kinsale was lost in 1601, heralding the end of the Gaelic order and Brehon Laws in Ireland, and the completion of the Elizabethan conquest. Following the Treaty of Mellifont of 1603 the new King James I pardoned Rory O'Donnell and created him Earl of Tyrconnell in the Irish peerage.

Rory then joined in the Flight of the Earls in 1607, which led to the title becoming attainted in 1614, and Tyrconnell and Ulster being colonised in the Plantation of Ulster. He died in exile in Rome on 28 July 1608.

Upon Rory O'Donnell's death in 1608, his son Hugh, who took the additional name Albert at his confirmation, under the patronage of Archduke Albert, succeeded to the title as 2nd Earl of Tyrconnell (which title was attainted in 1614 by the Crown but which attainder did not have any effect on his use of it in the Spanish realm) and thus the last titular earl of Tyrconnell was this Rory's son Hugh Albert, who died without heirs in 1642, and who by his will appointed Hugh Balldearg O'Donnell his heir. To a still elder branch belonged Daniel O'Donnell (1666–1735), a general of the Irish Brigade in the French service, whose father, Turlough, was a son of Hugh Duff O'Donnell, brother of Manus, son of an earlier Hugh Duff. Daniel served in the French army in the wars of the period, fighting against Duke of Marlborough at the battles of Oudenarde and Malplaquet at the head of an O'Donnell regiment.

== Succession ==
The head of the clan was traditionally also called Ua Domhnaill ("The O'Donnell"), and inaugurated as Taoiseach (Chieftain) in an elaborate ceremony, under the Laws of Tanistry, part of the ancient Brehon Code of Law. Since the collapse of Gaelic Rule and the Brehon legal system, the putative succession of the "Chiefs of the Name" followed the principle of male primogeniture, although this has been contested.

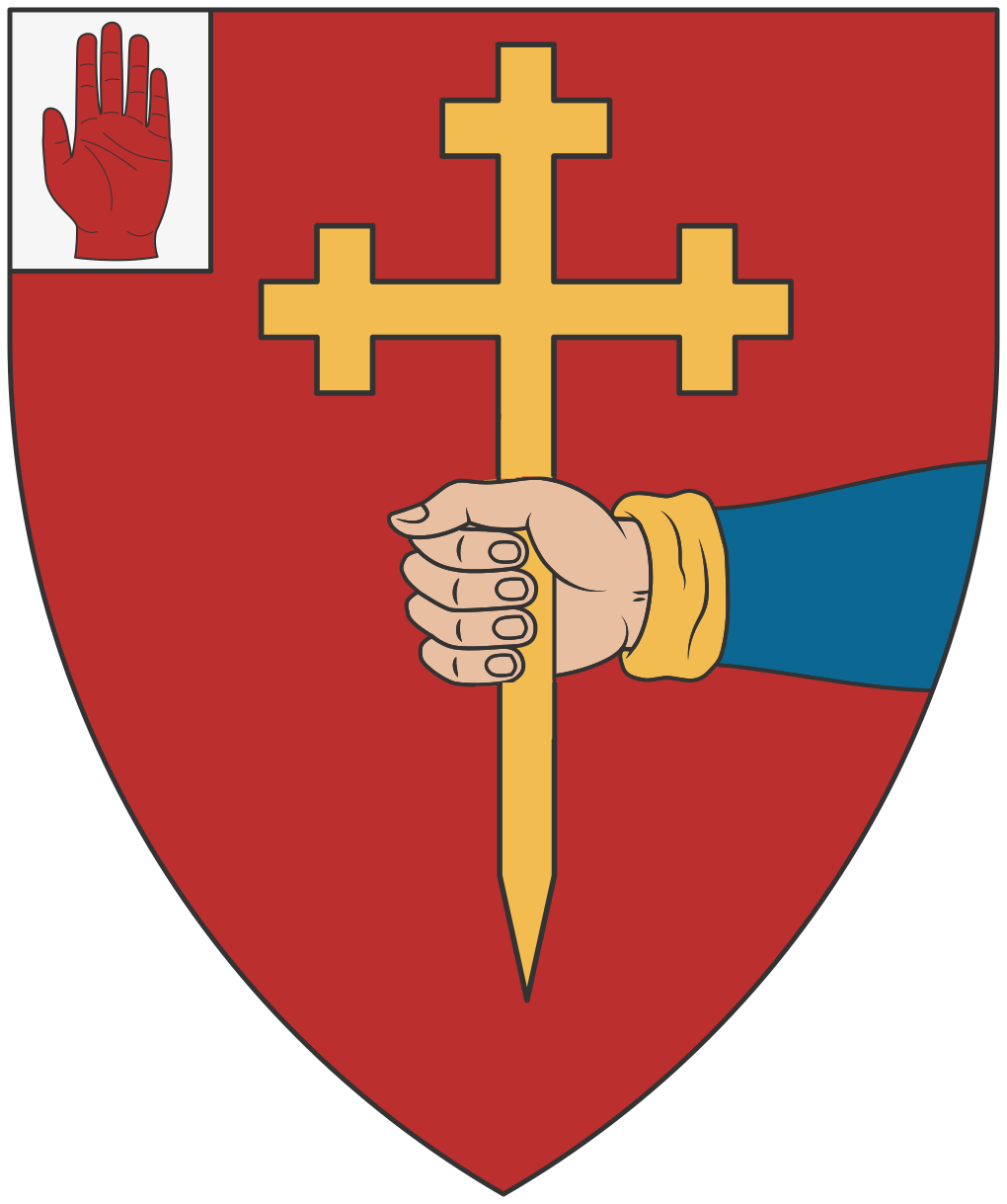
The coat of arms of the O'Donnell of Newport House, Baronets.

On the basis of the information available at the time, the Chief Herald of Ireland recognised John O'Donel of the Larkfield branch as Chief of the Name, and he was so gazetted on 11 September 1945 in Iris Oifigiuil, bearing the courtesy title of "The O'Donnell", and who was later inaugurated as Chief of the Name, The O'Donnell (Ua Domhnaill) in County Donegal at the O'Donnell Clan rally at Easter 1954. His son was the last in the Larkfield line of Chiefs of the Name of O'Donnell of Tyrconnell, namely Fr. Hugh Ambrose O'Donel, O.F.M., who adopted the modern version of the name 'O'Donnell', a Franciscan priest in Killiney, retired from missionary work in Zimbabwe, who died on 11 July 2023. Although Fr. Hugh was never inaugurated as Chief of the Clan, his supposed Tánaiste (heir apparent) as The O'Donnell of Tyrconnell, Chief of the Name of O'Donnell, was commonly held to be S.E. The 7th Duke of Tetuan, a Grandee of Spain. The duke is also known as S.E. Don Hugo O'Donnell y Duque de Estrada - the latter appendant Duque de Estrada is not a title but a maternal family name. The Duke of Tetuan is an active member of the Clan Association of the O'Donnells of Tyrconnell, of which he is Co-Patron, along with Count Douglas O'Donell von Tyrconnell (head of the Austrian branch), as the Clan Association does not hold a position of Chief, following the advice of the Attorney General, in 2003, whereby the Genealogical Office discontinued the practice of recognising Chiefs of the Name.. The Duke is also a member of the nobiliary Sovereign Military Hospitaller Order of Saint John of Jerusalem, of Rhodes, and of Malta, i.e. a Knight of Malta, as is the term-limited elected president of the Clan Association, Ambassador (ret.) Francis Martin O'Donnell.

Following the Irish War of Independence, the ascendant Fianna Fáil political party began a policy of granted courtesy recognition as Chief of the Name to the senior male descendants of the Gaelic nobility of Ireland. With regard to the O'Donnell dynasty, the succession came down to a contest between the O'Donnell family of Larkfield and the Duke of Tetuan of the Spanish nobility. The Irish State ultimately ruled in favour of John O'Donel of Larkfield, whose son Fr. Hugh O'Donnell, OFM, a Roman Catholic missionary in Zimbabwe, and who could document descent from Manus O'Donnell, the second son of Niall Garve and Nuala O'Donnell, who was killed in action while fighting for the Confederation of Kilkenny under the command of Owen Roe O'Neill at the Battle of Benburb in 1646. The O'Donnell clan was revived in 1954.

== Prominent O'Donnells ==
- Maol Seachlainn Ó Domhnaill (d. 1247), An Ó Domhnaill (The O'Donnell), Rí (King) of Tyrconnell, son of King Domhnall Mór Ó Domhnaill
- Gofraidh Ó Domhnaill (Godfrey O'Donnell; d. 1257), An Ó Domhnaill, King of Tyrconnell, son of Domhnall Mór Ó Domhnaill
- Domhnaill Óg Ó Domhnaill (c. 1242–1281), An Ó Domhnaill, possibly 'enkinged' (inaugurated) as King of Tyrconnell in Raphoe Cathedral in 1258
- Aodh Ruadh Ó Domhnaill I (Red Hugh O'Donnell I), An Ó Domhnaill, King of Tyrconnell, builder of Donegal Castle; reigned from c. 1460 until his death in 1505
- Sir Aodh Dubh Ó Domhnaill (Sir Hugh Doo O'Donnell), An Ó Domhnaill, King of Tyrconnell (d. 1537)
- Maghnas Ó Domhnaill (Manus O'Donnell; 1490–1564), An Ó Domhnaill, King of Tyrconnell, biographer of Saint Colmcille or Columba; mainly lived at Lifford
- Calbhach Ó Domhnaill (Calvagh O'Donnell; d. 1566), An Ó Domhnaill, 22nd Chieftain and King of Tyrconnell; son of Maghnas Ó Domhnaill
- Sir Aodh mac Maghnusa Ó Domhnaill (Sir Hugh McManus O'Donnell; c. 1540–1601), An Ó Domhnaill, King of Tyrconnell; son of Maghnas Ó Domhnaill
- Sir Domhnaill Ó Domhnaill (Sir Donnell O'Donnell; d. 1590), Seneschal of Tyrconnell and Sheriff of County Donegal, eldest son of Sir Aodh mac Maghnusa Ó Domhnaill; Sir Domhnaill was killed at the Battle of Doire Leathan in September 1590
- Nuala Ní Dhomhnaill (Nuala O'Donnell; c. 1575 – c. 1630), daughter of Sir Aodh mac Maghnusa Ó Domhnaill (Sir Hugh McManus O'Donnell)
- Conn O'Donnell (d. 1583), of Lifford in the east of Tyrconnell; son of Calbhach and father of Sir Niall Garbh
- Conn Oge O'Donnell (d. 1601), of Lifford, youngest son of Conn, brother of Sir Niall Garbh
- Sir Niall Garbh Ó Domhnaill (Sir Neil Garve O'Donnell; 1569–1626), Lord of Lifford; dynastic rival to both Aodh Ruadh II and Ruaidrí, Lord Tyrconnell
- Aodh Ruadh Ó Domhnaill II (Red Hugh O'Donnell II; 1572–1602), An Ó Domhnaill, 24th Chieftain, Rí (King) of Tyrconnell
- Ruaidrí, 1st Earl of Tyrconnell (1575–1608), An Ó Domhnaill, last reigning King of Tyrconnell; younger brother of Aodh Ruadh II
- Cathbarr Ó Domhnaill (Cathbarr O'Donnell; d. 1608), younger full brother of both Aodh Ruadh II and Ruaidrí, Lord Tyrconnell; married Rosa O'Doherty, sister of Sir Cathaoir Ó Dochartaigh
- Hugh, 2nd Earl of Tyrconnell (1606–1642), Prince and Lord of Tyrconnell; son and heir of Ruaidrí, 1st Earl of Tyrconnell
- Lady Mary Stuart O'Donnell (1607– c. 1639), Ulster Gaelic noblewoman; Lady Mary was the daughter of Ruaidrí, 1st Earl of Tyrconnell
- Général de Brigade Daniel O'Donnell (1666–1735), senior-ranking officer in the Irish Brigade in the French Royal service
- Karl O'Donnell (1715–1771), Graf von Tyrconnell (Count of Tyrconnell)
- Enrique, Conde de La Bisbal (Henry, Count of La Bisbal; 1769–1834), Irish-Spanish nobleman and peer (de:Joseph Heinrich O’Donnell)
- Comte Maurice O'Donnell de Tyrconnell (1780–1843), of Pressburg, also known as Moritz Graf O'Donnell von Tyrconnell, an Irish-Austrian count
- Maximilian Karl Lamoral Graf O'Donell von Tyrconnell (1812–1895), Irish-Austrian count, son of Maurice/Moritz
- Comte Jean Louis Barthélemy O'Donnell (1783–1836), Irish-French count, member of Napoleon's Conseil d’État and Légion d'honneur
- General The 1st Duke of Tetuán (1809–1867), former Prime Minister of Spain
- The 2nd Duke of Tetuán (1834–1903), Spanish foreign minister and Mayordomo mayor to King Amadeo I.
- The 3rd Duke of Tetuán (1864–1928), conducted Winston Churchill on visit to Cuba
- Peadar O'Donnell (1893–1986), radical Irish republican, socialist, activist, and politician
- Patrick Cardinal O'Donnell (1856–1927), Lord Primate of All Ireland and Lord Archbishop of Armagh; senior prelate from near Glenties
- Denis O'Donnell (1875–1933), entrepreneur, founder of Lee Strand Cooperative Creamery
- Patrick Denis O'Donnell (1922–2005), Commandant/Irish Defence Forces, UN peacekeeper, military historian and author
- Francis Martin O'Donnell (b. 1954), Ambassador Knight of Malta, Fellow World Academy of Art and Science, President, Clan O'Donnell of Tyrconnell, President Genealogical Society of Ireland; former UN senior representative.
- Guillermo O'Donnell, (1936–2011), Argentine political scientist, professor, author, and international activist for democracy
- The 7th Duke of Tetuán (b. 1948), Spanish naval historian and member Royal Academy of History and Knight of Malta,
- O'Donnell baronets, of Newport House, recovered & entrusted Cathach of St. Columba to the Royal Irish Academy
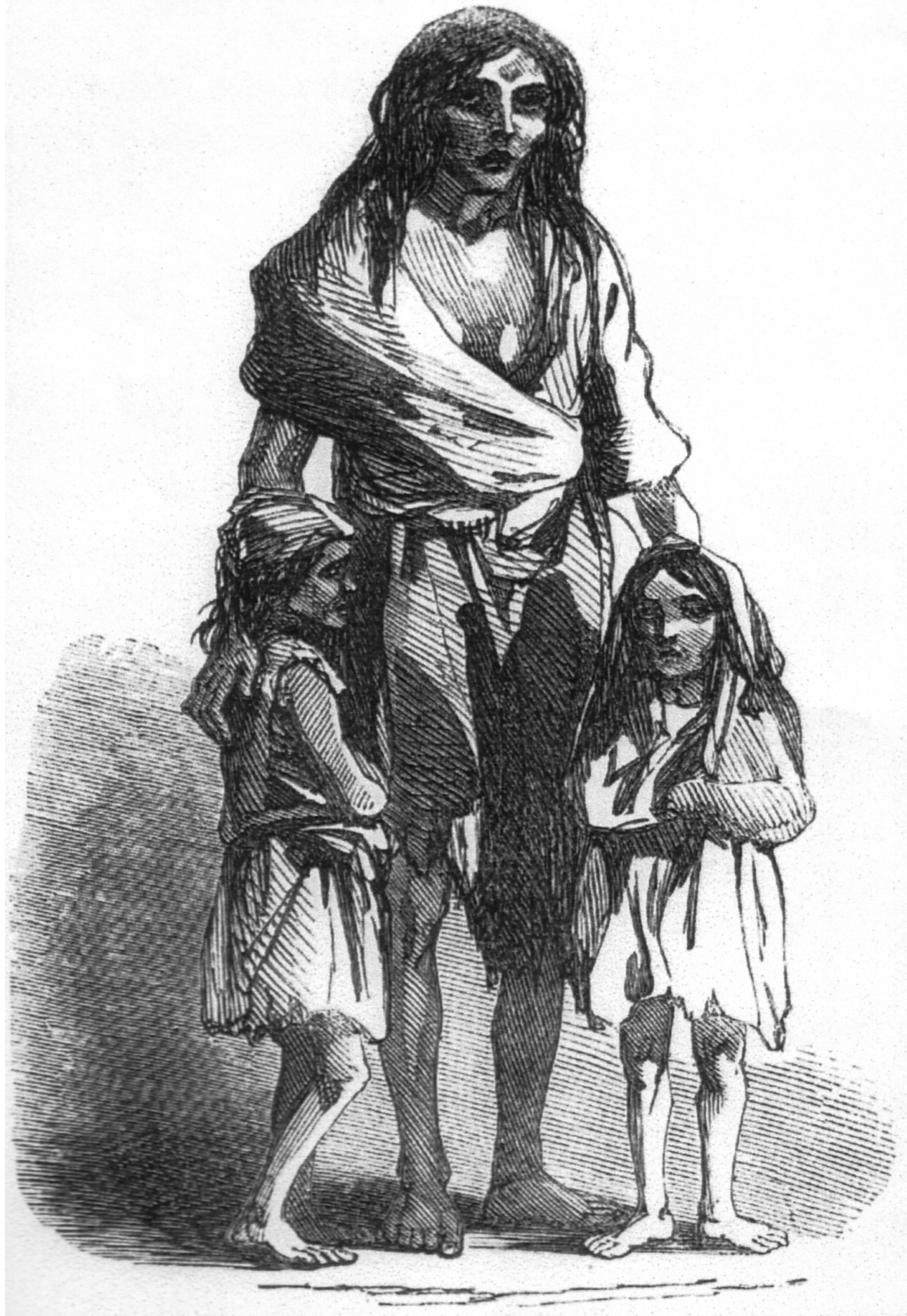
An 1849 depiction of Bridget O'Donnell and her two children during the famine.

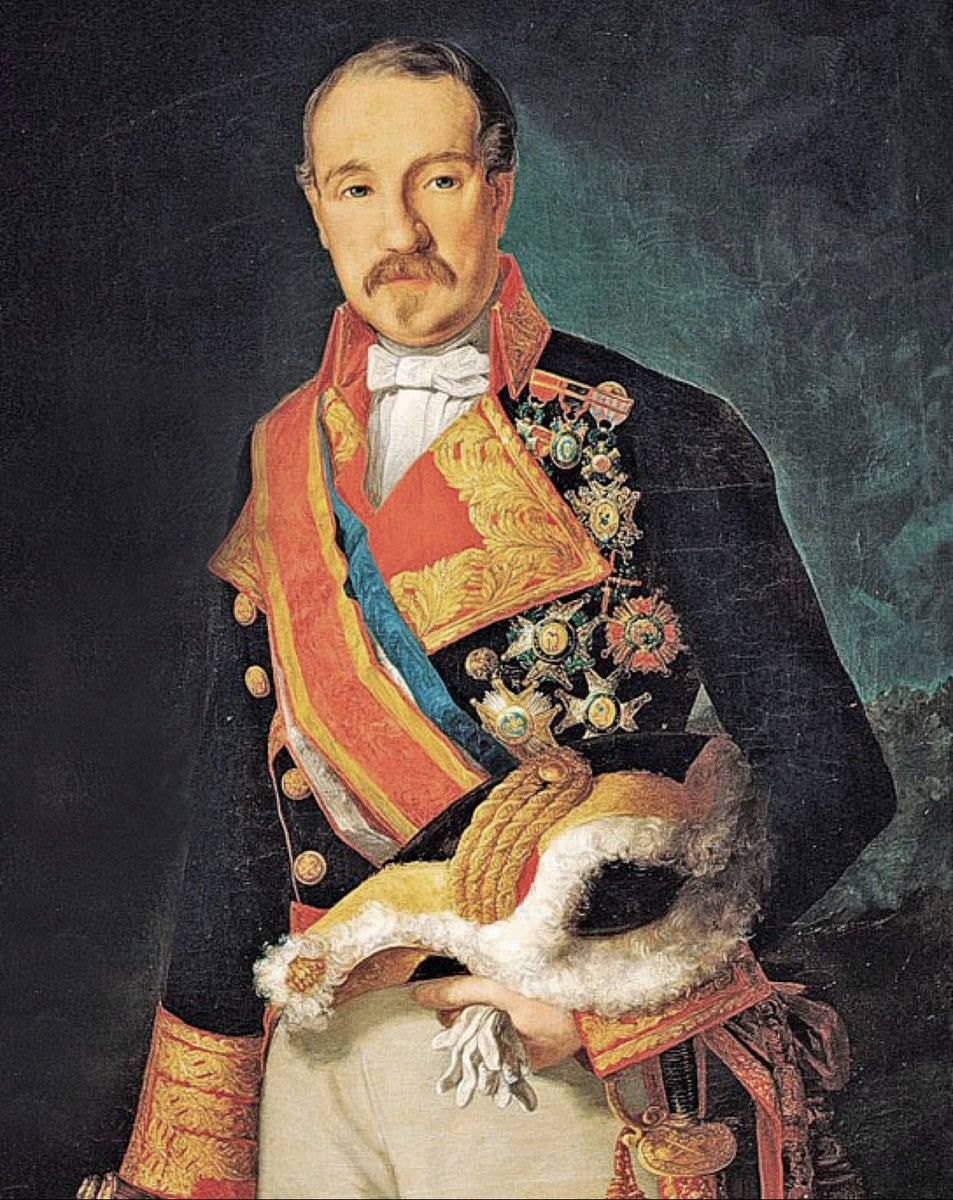
General The 1st Duke of Tetuán

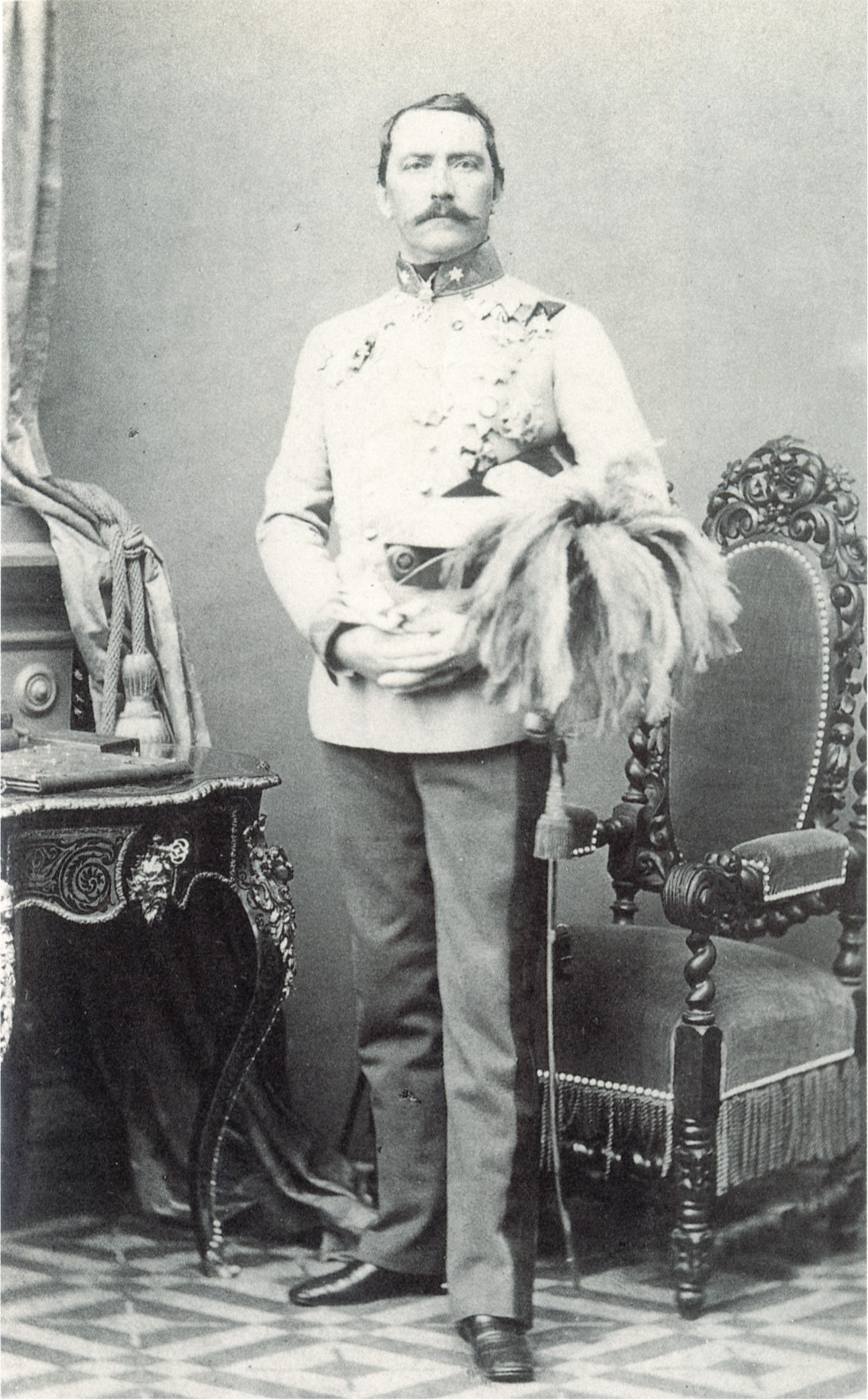
Maximilian Karl Lamoral Graf O'Donell von Tyrconnell,1860

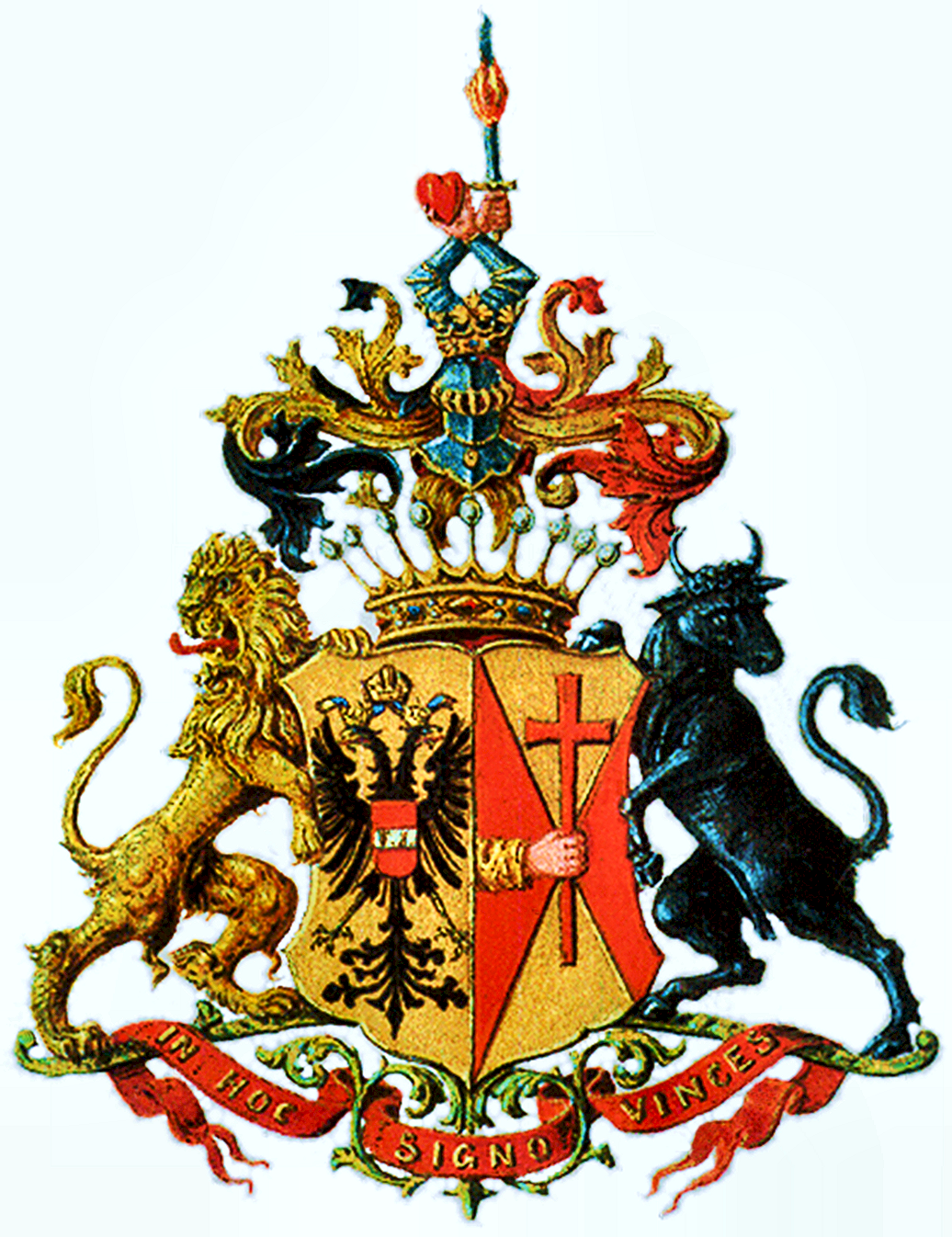
Maximilian Graf O'Donell von Tyrconnell's coat of arms

== Recent times ==
Patrick Cardinal O'Donnell (1856–1927) was probably the next most prominent O'Donnell to emerge in Ulster, perhaps in all of Ireland, after the exile in 1607 of the 1st Earl of Tyrconnell. Thomas O'Donnell (1871–1943), MP for West Kerry from 1900 until 1918, was a leading agrarian reformer, and the first Member of Parliament to address the House of Commons in Westminster in the Irish language (Gaelic), but was called to order by the Speaker, but not without having made his mark with John Redmond's support. There was formerly an Irish senator from County Donegal named Brian Ó Domhnaill (O'Donnell).

== Family Tree ==
Donall Mor; MacEgneghan O'Donnell d. 1241	Lasairfhíona; Ní Conchobhair
Melaghlin; O'Donnell d. 1247	Gofraid; O'Donnell d. 1257	Donal Oge; O'Donnell d. 1281
Daughter of O'Gallagher	Hugh; O'Donnell fl. 1281–1290	Dearbhforgaill; O'Conor	Turlough; O'Donnell d. 1303
Neal Garbh; O'Donnell d. 1380	Conor; O'Donnell	Felim; O'Donnell
Turlough- an-Fhina O'Donnell d. 1422	Aonghus; O'Donnell	Seaán; O'Donnell
Niall Garbh; O'Donnell d. 1439	Naughton; O'Donnell c. 1392–1452
Hugh Roe; O'Donnell c. 1427–1505	Donnell; O'Donnell fl. 1452
Hugh Dubh; O'Donnell d. 1537
Manus; O'Donnell; 1490–1563	Hugh; McHugh Dubh; O'Donnell c. 1537–1618
Calvagh; O'Donnell c. 1515–1566
Nuala; O'Neill	Hugh; McManus; O'Donnell c. 1520–1600	Fiona "Iníon Dubh"; MacDonald	Hugh; MacEdegany d. 1588 illegitimate	Conn; O'Donnell d. 1583	Rose; O'Neill
Hugh; O'Neill c. 1550–1616	Siobhán; O'Donnell d. 1591	Donal; O'Donnell d. 1590	Hugh Roe; O'Donnell; 1572–1602	Rory; O'Donnell; 1575–1608	Bridget; FitzGerald c. 1589–1682	Nuala; O'Donnell c. 1575–c. 1630	Niall Garve; O'Donnell c. 1569–1626	Conn Oge; O'Donnell d. 1601
Donal Oge; O'Donnell c. 1585–1620	Hugh Albert; O'Donnell; 1606–1642	Mary Stuart; O'Donnell c. 1607–after 1638	Manus; O'Donnell d. 1646	Austrian branch; descendants include Maurice O'Donnell and Maximilian Karl Lamoral O'Donnell

Legend

XXX	Earl of Tyrconnell	XXX	King of Tyrconnell	XXX	Succession; Challenger

== See also ==
- Irish nobility
- Gaelic nobility of Ireland
- O'Donnell Abu

== Sources ==
- Ellis, Peter Berresford (2002). Erin's Blood Royal: The Gaelic Noble Dynasties of Ireland. Palgrave. ISBN 978-0-312-23049-4.
