= Hugh O'Donnell =

Hugh O'Donnell may refer to:

- Hugh O'Donnell (labor leader) (1869–?), American leader of the Homestead Steel Strike of 1892
- Hugh O'Donnell (priest) (1884–1947), American priest and President of the University of Notre Dame
- Hugh O'Donnell (footballer) (1913–1965), Scottish professional footballer
- Hugh O'Donnell (artist) (born 1950), English painter and printmaker
- Hugh O'Donnell (politician) (born 1952), Scottish politician

== Irish noblemen ==
- Hugh Roe O'Donnell (died 1505), King of Tyrconnell
- Hugh Duff O'Donnell (died 1537), Gaelic Irish nobleman
- Sir Hugh O'Donnell (died 1600), Gaelic Irish lord
- Hugh Roe O'Donnell (1572–1602), Lord of Tyrconnell and military leader during the Nine Years' War
- Hugh Dubh O'Donnell (died 1618), Gaelic Irish nobleman
- Hugh O'Donnell, 2nd Earl of Tyrconnell (1606–1642), Irish-born nobleman and soldier
- Hugh O'Donnell (died 1625), Irish-born soldier, son of Cathbarr O'Donnell
