= Battle of Knockavoe =

1522 battle in Ireland

- Part of the Irish Clan Wars
Date	1522
Location	near Knockavoe, Ireland
Result	Tyrconnell victory

Belligerents
Kingdom of Tyrconnell	Kingdom of Tyrone

Commanders and leaders
Hugh Dubh O'Donnell; Manus O'Donnell	Conn Bacagh O'Neill

Strength
Unknown	Unknown

Casualties and losses
Unknown	900 killed

The Battle of Knockavoe (Cnoc-Buidhbh) was fought in 1522 between the O'Donnells, led by Hugh Dubh O'Donnell and Manus O'Donnell, both sons of Sir Hugh Dubh O'Donnell, against the O'Neills, in which the O'Neills and their supporters were surprised and routed. Knockavoe was not a lost pitched battle, rather it was in fact the result of a nighttime surprise attack on the O'Neill camp by the O'Donnells. Knockavoe is the hill just behind Strabane in County Tyrone.

== Background ==
Conn Bacach O'Neill (who was later created Earl of Tyrone, in 1542) was determined to bring the O'Donnells under his rule and made a great gathering, determined to march into Tyrconnell. Forces arrived from Munster and Connacht, together with English contingents, and brought into O'Neill's army itself were the Scoto-Irish MacDonnells of Antrim, Bissetts, MacSheehys and others. The forces laid siege to and took Ballyshannon Castle, and later devastated a large part of Tyrconnell.

== Battle ==
While encamped at Knockavoe, on the outskirts of Strabane, Conn O'Neill's forces were surprised at night by Hugh Dubh O'Donnell and Manus O'Donnell. Hugh and Manus led their small force quietly up to the campsite and launched a surprise attack before the sentinels were aware of how matters stood, with the two forces fighting furiously in pitch darkness in the midst of the camp. After a long and fearful struggle, in which men found it hard to distinguish friend from foe, the completely unprepared O'Neills and their supporters were routed with a loss of 900 men; and O'Donnell took possession of the camp, with an immense quantity of booty.

The full account of the battle is contained in The Annals of the Four Masters as follows:—

When O'Donnell heard that O'Neill had done these deeds, he ordered his son, Manus O'Donnell, to proceed into Tyrone with a detachment

of his army, and to plunder and burn that country; and he himself, with the number of forces he had kept with him, directed his course over Bearnas, in pursuit of O'Neill, and to defend Tirhugh. As to Manus, he plundered and burned all the neighbouring parts of Kinel-Owen; he also slew and destroyed many persons, and then returned in triumph. When O'Neill discovered that Manus had gone into Tyrone, he returned across the River Finn, and spoiled the country before him as far as Ceann-Maghair, from whence he carried off a prey; and he then proceeded in triumph to his own country. O'Neill afterwards pitched his camp at Cnoc Buidhbh, at Loch Monann, commonly called Cnoc an Bhogha, with all the forces before mentioned, except the western army, as we have said before. As to O'Donnell, after his son Manus had reached him with many spoils, as he had not caught O'Neill at Ballyshannon, and as he had not overtaken him after the plundering of Ceann-Maghair, he returned across Bearnas, and mustered all the forces he had, though they were few against many at that time, and they all came to one place to Druim-Lighean. They held council to consider what they should do in the strait difficulties they had to meet, for they knew that they would not be at all able to maintain a contest with O'Neill and his army, and with the Connacian army, which was then marching towards their country, should they succeed in joining each other before the engagement; so that the resolution they adopted was to attack O'Neill, as he was the nearest to them, choosing rather to be slain on the field than to become slaves to any one in the world. They agreed (as the army opposed to them were so very nurmerous) to attack O'Neill's by night. A notice and forewarning of this resolution reached O'Neill, so that he placed sentinels to guard every pass by which he thought the Kinel-Connell might come to attack him, while he himself, with the main body of his army, remained on the watch at the rere in his camp. O'Donnell, having arrayed and marshalled, excited and earnestly exhorted his small army, commanded them to abandon their horses, for they had no desire to escape from the field of battle unless they should be the victors. They his forces then advanced until they came up to the sentinels of O'Neill without being perceived by them. However, the sentinels began to give notice to their people that their enemies were approaching. The Kinel-Connell now, fearing that the sentinels would reach O'Neill before them, rushed onwards with such violence and vehemence that they went out of array; and they and the sentinels reached the camp together. On thus coming into collision with one another they raised great shouts aloud, and their clamour was not feebly responded to by O'Neill's common soldiers, for they proceeded bravely and protectively to defend their chief and their camp. Both armies were engaged at striking and killing each other, and mighty men were subdued, and heroes hacked, on either side; men were hewn down, and death and evil destiny seized vigorous youths in that place. Scarcely did any one of them on either side know with whom he should engage in combat, for they could not discern one another's faces on account of the darkness of the night, and their close intermixing with each other. At last, however, O'Neill and his army were defeated, and the camp was left to O'Donnell. Great indeed was the slaughter made upon O'Neill recte, O'Neill's forces on that spot, for it was calculated by the people of the churches in which many of them were interred, and by those of the neighbours who were near them and recognized the bodies, that upwards of nine hundred of O'Neill's army fell in that engagement, so that the name and renown of that victory spread all over Ireland. The most distinguished men who fell in that engagement were the following: Donnell Oge Mac Donnell, with a countless number of gallowglasses of the Clann-Donnell Mac Donnell; Turlough Mac Sheehy, with a great number of his people; John Bissett, with the greater part of the Scots who had come with him; Hugh, the son of Owen, son of William Mac Mahon, with a party of his troops; and Rory Maguire, and some of his people along with him. There fell there also many of the Lagenians and of the men of Meath, for there came not a leader of a band or troop, small or great, in that muster of O'Neill, who did not complain of the number of his people that were left dead on that field; so that this battle of Cnoc Buidhbh was one of the most bloody engagements that had ever occurred between the Kinel-Connell and the Kinel-Owen. The Kinel-Connel seized upon horses, arms, armour, a store of provisions, strong liquors, and several beautiful and rich articles, both eiscras and goblets, of the forces whom they had defeated; and though O'Donnell's people were without horses on going into the engagement, they had many horses from the warriors whom they had cut off in that slaughter. Some of O'Donnell's forces went to their houses with their share of the spoils, without his permission, but he sent them a peremptory order to return to him at once; and after they had collected to one place at his summons, he marched, with all the speed that might be, westwards, through the gap of Bearnas Mor, over the Rivers Erne, Drowes, and

Duff, and over the lower part of Carbury, and pitched his camp at Ceathramha-na-madadh, on the north side of Binn-Golban.

Notes: Cnoc-Buidhbh, or the Hill of Bove Derg, is the old Gaelic name for Knockavoe. Loch Monann was a lake that later burst out and formed Strabane Glen. Druim-Lighean refers to Drumboy Hill, just beyond Lifford, on the Letterkenny Road.

== Aftermath ==
The battle was one of the bloodiest ever fought between the O'Donnells and O'Neills, did not end the quarrel. Lord Kildare, who was Conn Bacach O'Neill's first cousin, tried to make peace; but in spite of his efforts the war continued for many years afterwards.

The only long-term result of Knockavoe did not involve the O'Donnells and O'Neills, but rather the MacDonnells and Bissetts. The last Mac Eoin Bissett, Lord of the Glens of Antrim, was slain in the battle, allowing the increasingly strong MacDonnells to seize the lordship from the weakened Bissetts and establish themselves as one of the most prominent families in Ulster.

== See also ==
- History of Ireland
