= Hugh Dubh O'Donnell =

Hugh McHugh Dubh O'Donnell Aodh mac Aodh Dubh Ó Domhnaill
- Born: c. 1537; Tyrconnell, Ulster, Ireland
- Died: 1618 (aged ~81); Ireland
- Father: Hugh Duff O'Donnell

Hugh McHugh Dubh O'Donnell (Irish: Aodh mac Aodh Dubh Ó Domhnaill; c. 1537-1618) was a member of the O'Donnell dynasty of Tyrconnell in modern-day County Donegal. He was the younger brother of Manus O'Donnell, the ruler of Tyrconnell between 1537 and 1555. When his brother died, Hugh Dubh unsuccessfully challenged for the lordship, which was held by his two nephews, Calvagh O'Donnell and Sir Hugh O'Donnell. He was supported in his claim by Miler Magrath who suggested that his seniority in the family made him the rightful candidate.

Hugh Dubh's powerbase was in northern Donegal, between the River Lennon and the River Swilly. He held castles at Cahir Anuske and Ramelton. He was able to survive attacks by rival O'Donnell claimants but was unable to gain the support of the Crown for his claims because he was regarded as untrustworthy. He again challenged for the lordship of the O'Donnell's against his great-nephews Sir Donnell O'Donnell and Hugh Roe O'Donnell. Ironically Hugh Dubh was a foster-father to Hugh Roe. In 1593, he was forced to acknowledge the succession of Hugh Roe after he captured his stronghold of Beleek and executed sixteen of his leading supporters. Hugh Dubh was still in possession of a large amount of land by the time of the Ulster Plantation.

He is noted for his long life, outliving many of his O'Donnell rivals across several generations.

== Bibliography ==
- Morgan, Hiram. Tyrone's Rebellion. Boydell Press, 1999.
