= Karl O'Donnell =

Austrian noblemen, imperial general

Karl O'Donnell, Count of Tyrconnel (1715–1771) held important commands in the Austrian army during the Seven Years' War. Between 1768 and 1770, he was governor of Transylvania.

== Biography ==
O'Donnell held important commands during the Third Silesian War between Prussia and Austria, during the Seven Years' War, up to the rank of general. He distinguished himself in the Battles of Lobositz (1756), Prague (1757) and Kolin (1757). He was wounded and taken prisoner in the Battle of Leuthen. Released in 1758, he participated in the Battle of Hochkirch and Battle of Maxen, amongst others.
His greatest military performance was in the Battle of Torgau (1760), where he repelled an attack from the numerically superior enemy cavalry and took over the command for the wounded Field Marshal Graf von Daun, which he held until the winter of 1760. He was awarded the Grand Cross of the Military Order of Maria Theresa for his achievements in this battle.

== Family ==
O'Donnell was a descendant of the Irish noble dynasty of O'Donnell of Tyrconnell who left Ireland after the Battle of the Boyne and settled in Austria.

=== Descendants ===
A descendant Maximilian Karl Lamoral O'Donnell was a notable figure in the history of the Italian and Hungarian campaigns of 1848 and 1849, and achieved fame for helping to save the life of Emperor Franz Josef I during an assassination attempt in 1853.

Henry Joseph O'Donnell, Count of La Bisbal (1769–1834) was from another branch of the family, a member of the Irish noble dynasty of O'Donnell of Tyrconnell who left Ireland after the Battle of the Boyne; he was a general in the Spanish Army during the Napoleonic Wars.
