= Maurice O'Donnell =

Comte Maurice O'Donnell de Tyrconnell (German: Moritz Graf O'Donnell von Tyrconnell; 1780–1843) was an Austro-Irish count, born in Vienna.

== Family ==
He was a descendant of the Irish noble dynasty of O'Donnell of Tyrconnell, some of whom fled to the Continent and became nobles of Spain, France, and in this case Austria, the Habsburg empire. He was a son of Minister Joseph Count O'Donnell von Tyrconnell (1755–1810) and Theresa O'Donnell, and a grandson of Major-General Henry Count O'Donnell von Tyrconnell (1726–1789) and his wife, Princess Leopoldine Kantacuzene (Cantacuzino, of Moldavia and Wallachia). Maurice's wife, Christine "Titine" (1788–1867), was an illegitimate daughter of Charles de Ligne (1759–1792), first son of the Prince de Ligne to whom Goethe wrote more than once in 1813. They lived in Pressburg (now Bratislava, Slovakia) and had two sons: Maximilian Karl Lamoral Graf O'Donnell von Tyrconnell, who saved the life of Emperor Franz Josef I of Austria in 1853; and Maurice Jr, Moritz O'Donnell.

== Career ==
He was raised in the Austro-Hungarian Academy of Engineers, and appointed as a sub-lieutenant at the age of sixteen. In 1799 he was promoted to the rank of captain in the 54th Infantry Regiment, guarding the Wallachian-Illyrian frontier of the Empire. In 1802 he took leave and made a voyage to Italy, where he met the renowned Madame de Staël during five days in Venice. It was the beginning of a long relationship with Europe's leading socialite that lasted many years, with an intense correspondence with Madame de Staël, who at one time beseeched him to marry her.

On 11 April 1813, he was promoted to the rank of lieutenant-colonel, and took part in campaigns in France, where he distinguished himself at the siege of Besançon. He was made a full colonel on 1 June 1814, and returned to Vienna at the end of that year, but by the end of April 1815 he was away again in military service in the campaign against Napoleon, and by September he was in Paris with the Allies. On 1 October 1816, he was granted the command of the 45th Infantry Regiment, and in 1822, was placed in charge of a mission to Italy. On 9 March 1828, he was appointed brigadier-general in Vienna, and sent again to Italy that year. On 9 May 1832, he was transferred to Gratz, where he was demobilized on 8 May 1834 with a pension on 500 florins. However, he was again promoted to the rank of lieutenant-general of a division ad honorem.

He died in Dresden on 30 November 1843, and his wife the Countess Titine survived him until 1867.
