= Donegal Castle =

Restored castle in County Donegal, Ireland

Coordinates: 54.655°N 8.111°W

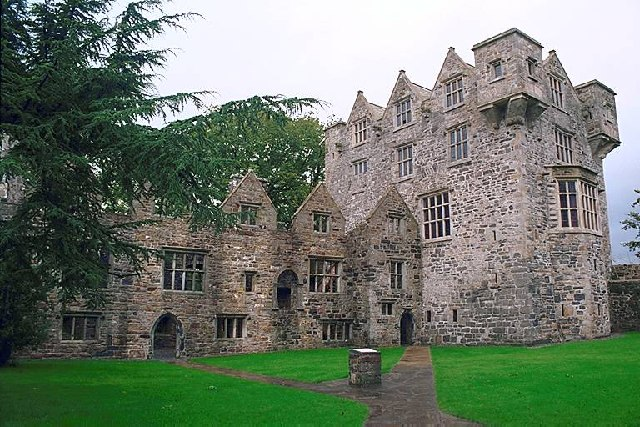
Donegal Castle showing keep, on right, and Jacobean wing

Donegal Castle (Irish: Caisleán Dhún na nGall) is a castle situated in the centre of Donegal Town in County Donegal in Ulster, the northern province in Ireland. The castle was the stronghold of the O'Donnell clan, Lords of Tír Conaill and one of the most powerful Gaelic families in Ireland from the 5th to the 16th centuries. For most of the last two centuries, the majority of the buildings lay in ruins but the castle was almost fully restored in the early 1990s. It is now open to the public.

== Structure and location ==
The castle consists of a 15th-century rectangular keep with a later Jacobean style wing. There is a small gatehouse at its entrance mirroring the design of the keep. The complex is sited on a bend in the River Eske, near the mouth of Donegal Bay, and is surrounded by a 17th-century boundary wall. Most of the stonework was constructed from locally sourced limestone with some sandstone.

== History ==
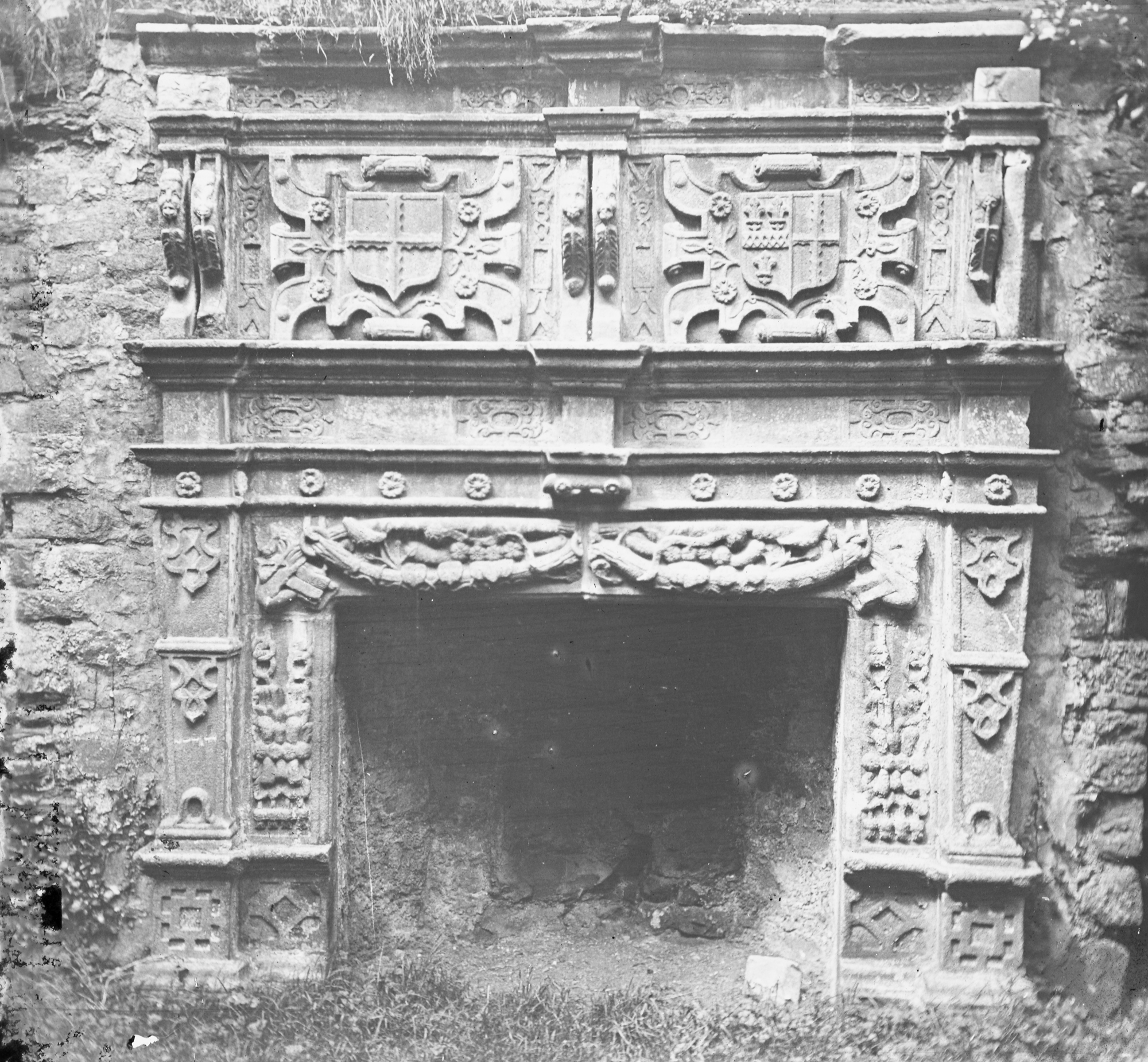
Brooke Fireplace in the Great Hall of Donegal Castle, 1895

Donegal (Irish: Dún na nGall), translates as Fort of the Foreigner possibly coming from a Viking fortress in the area destroyed in 1159. However, due to hundreds of years of development, no archaeological evidence of this early fortress has been found. Hugh Roe O'Donnell I, wealthy chief of the O’Donnell clan, built the castle in the 1460s or early 1470s. In 1474, he and his wife Nuala founded a Franciscan friary further down the river. A local legend tells of a tunnel connecting the two but no evidence for this has been found. The castle was regarded as one of the finest Gaelic castles in Ireland. This was indicated by a report by the visiting English Viceroy, the Lord Deputy of Ireland, Sir Henry Sidney, in 1566, in a letter to William Cecil (created The 1st Baron Burghley in 1571), the Lord High Treasurer, describing it as "the largest and strongest fortress in all Ireland", adding:

"it is the greatest I ever saw in an Irishman's hands: and would appear to be in good keeping; one of the fairest situated in good soil and so nigh a portable water a boat of ten tonnes could come within ten yards of it"

In 1607, after the Nine Years' War, the leaders of the O'Donnell clan left Ireland in the Flight of the Earls. In 1611, during the Plantation of Ulster, the castle and its lands were granted to an English captain, Basil Brooke. The tower house was severely damaged by the departing O'Donnells to prevent the castle from being used against the Gaelic clans but was quickly restored by its new owners. Brooke also added windows, a gable and a large manor-house wing to the keep, all in the Jacobean style.

The Brooke family owned the castle up until the 1670s when they moved to near Lisnaskea in County Fermanagh. At that time, in the 1670s, the Brookes sold the castle to the Gore dynasty, who later became Earls of Arran in the Peerage of Ireland. The castle fell into a ruinous state under the Gores in the early 18th century. In 1898, the then owner, the 5th Earl of Arran, vested the castle in the Office of Public Works.

=== Restoration ===
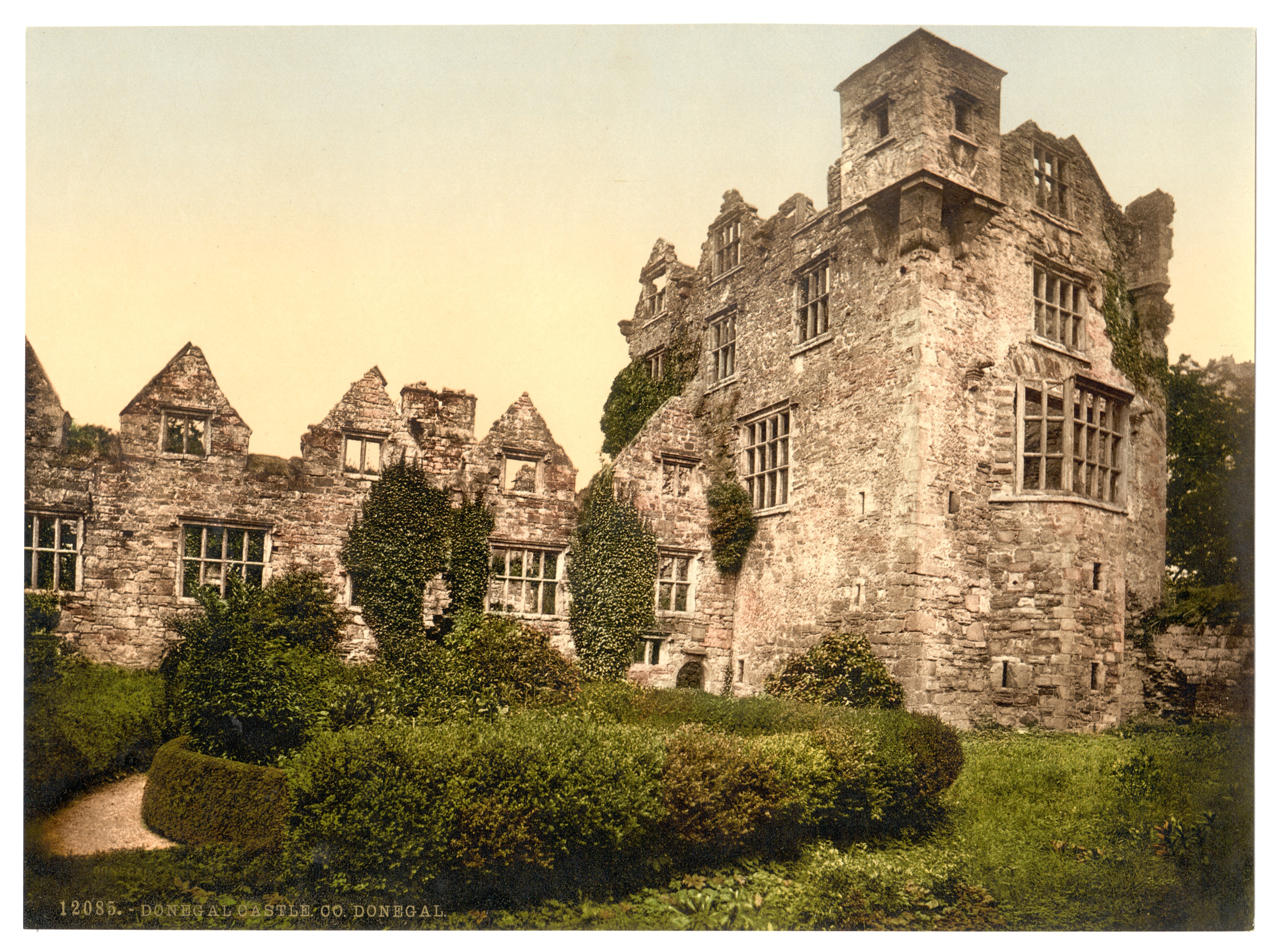
Donegal Castle, circa 1900 Library of Congress collection

In the early 1990s, the castle was partially restored by the Office of Public Works (the O.P.W.). The tower house element has had new roofing and flooring added, in keeping with the original styles and techniques used in the 15th and 17th centuries. The stonework has been restored and the manor wing has been partially roofed. Some of the oak timbers used came from the Colebrooke Estate, just outside Brookeborough in County Fermanagh. Parts of the exterior of the tower house have been harled.

Donegal Castle was granted to Sir Basil Brooke in 1616. It was eventually restored in the 1990s, and it is now open to the public as a tourist attraction. The castle is now open to the public and often hosts events such as Gaelic cultural evenings or Ulster Scots events.
