= List of rulers of Tyrconnell =

This article lists the rulers of Tyrconnell (Irish: Tír Ċonaıll), a medieval Irish kingdom which covered much of what is now County Donegal. Unless otherwise stated, all dates before 1752 are given in the Gregorian calendar, which was used by Irish chroniclers.

== Oral history ==
It was founded in the fifth century by a son of Niall of the Nine Hostages, Conall Gulban, of whom the Cenél Conaill are descended. They ruled the kingdom until the Flight of the Earls in September 1607, which marked the end of the kingdom.

== Early Chiefs of Cenél Conaill ==
- Conall Gulban mac Néill (died 464)
- .......
- Ninnid mac Dauach (flourished 544-563)
- Ainmuire mac Sétnai (died 569)
- Báetán mac Ninneda (died 586).
- Áed mac Ainmuirech (died 598)
- Conall Cú mac Áedo (died 604)
- Máel Coba mac Áedo (died 615)
- Domnall mac Áedo (died 642)
- Conall Cóel mac Máele Coba (died 654)
- Cellach mac Máele Coba (died 658)
- ......
- Loingsech mac Óengusso (died 703)
- Congal Cennmagair mac Fergusa (died 710)
- Flaithbertach mac Loingsig (died 765)
- Áed Muinderg mac Flaithbertaig (died 747)
- Loingsech mac Flaithbertaig (died 754)
- Murchad mac Flaithbertaig (died 767)
- Domnall mac Áeda Muindeirg (died 804)
- Máel Bresail mac Murchada (died 819)
- Ruaidrí ua Canannáin (died 950)

== 13th century – 17th century ==
O'Donnell clan chiefs were inaugurated with a traditional ceremony. Under brehon law, the title of clan chief could only be transferred by abdication or the death of the current clan chief. Despite this, many of the following individuals took power by force by imprisoning or overpowering the current clan chief, effectively becoming the ruler of Tyrconnell.

Illustration	Name	Reign	Claim	Life details	Ref.
	Egneghan MacDaly Eigneachan mac Dalach	1201 – 1207		1207	
	Donall Mor MacEgneghan O'Donnell Domhnall Mór mac Eicnechain Ó Domhnaill	1207 – 1241	Son of Eneas	1241	
	Melaghlin O'Donnell Maol Seachlainn Ó Domhnaill	1241 – 1247	Son of Donall Mor	1247	
	Gofraid O'Donnell Gofraidh Ó Domhnaill	1247 – 1257		died 1257	
	Donal Oge O'Donnell Domhnall Óg Ó Domhnaill	1257 – 1281	Son of Donall Mor	c. 1242 – 1281	
	Hugh O'Donnell Aodh Ó Domhnaill	1281 – 1290	Son of Donal Oge	1333	
	Turlough O'Donnell Toirdhealbhach Ó Domhnaill	1290 – 1303	Son of Donal Oge	1303	
	Hugh O'Donnell Aodh Ó Domhnaill	began 1303	Son of Donal Oge		
	Connor O'Donnell Conchobhar Ó Domhnaill	1333 – 1342	Son of Hugh		
	Niall Maelsechlainn Donnchadh Garbh O'Donnell	1342 – 1348	Son of Hugh		
	Aonghus O'Donnell Aonghus Ó Domhnaill	1348 – 1352	Son of Connor		
	Felim O'Donnell Felim Ó Domhnaill	1352 – 1356	Son of Hugh		
	Seaán O'Donnell Seaán Ó Domhnaill	1356 – 1380	Son of Connor		
	Neal Garbh O'Donnell	ended 1380	Son of Hugh	1380	
	Turlough-an-Fhina O'Donnell Tairrdelbach an Fhiona Ó Domhnaill	1380 – 1422	Son of Neal Garbh	1422	
	Niall Garve O'Donnell Niall Garbh Ó Domhnaill	1422 – 1439	Son of Turlough-an-Fhina	1439	
	Naughton O'Donnell Neachtan Ó Domhnaill	1439 – 16 May 1452	Son of Turlough-an-Fhina	c. 1392 – 16 May 1452 (aged 59–60)	
	Hugh Roe O'Donnell I Aodh Ruadh mac Néill Gairbh Ó Domhnaill	c. 1461 – 11 July 1505	Son of Niall Garve	c. 1427 – 11 July 1505(aged 78)	
	Hugh Duff O'Donnell Aodh Dubh Ó Domhnaill	11 July 1505 – 5 July 1537	Son of Hugh Roe I	5 July 1537	
	Manus O'Donnell Maghnas Ó Domhnaill	5 July 1537 – 1555	Son of Hugh Duff	1490 – 9 February 1563 (aged 72–73) Imprisoned and deposed by his son Calvagh in 1555; Died during imprisonment in Lifford.	
	Calvagh O'Donnell Calbhach Ó Domhnaill	1555 – 26 October 1566	Son of Manus	c. 1515 – 26 October 1566 (aged 50–51) Seized power in 1555	
	Hugh McManus O'Donnell Aodh mac Maghnusa Ó Domhnaill	26 October 1566 – 3 May 1592	Son of Manus	c. 1520 – 7 November 1600 (aged 79–80) Seized power in 1561 with Calvagh's imprisonment. Became senile in his later years and abdicated.	
	Hugh Roe O'Donnell II Aodh Ruadh Ó Domhnaill	3 May 1592 – 9 September 1602	Son of Hugh McManus	October 1572 – 9 September 1602 (aged 29) Senior confederate commander in the Nine Years' War. Died in Simancas whilst seeking Spanish reinforcements.	
	Niall Garbh O'Donnell Niall Garbh Ó Domhnaill	1603 – 1626 (disputed)	Grandson of Calvagh	c. 1569 – 1626 (aged 57) Fought for the Crown during the Nine Years' War. Traditionally inaugurated but challenged by Rory. Arrested for instigating O'Doherty's rebellion and sent to the Tower of London for life in 1609.	
	Rory O'Donnell Rudhraighe Ó Domhnaill	1602 – 1608 (disputed)	Son of Hugh McManus	1575 – 28 July 1608 (aged 32–33) Elevated as Earl of Tyrconnell by King James on 4 September 1603. Took part in the Flight of the Earls. Died in Rome of fever.	
