= Battle of Farsetmore =

16th Century Clan War battle in Ireland

Coordinates: 54°57′15″N 7°41′24″W

- Part of Irish Clan Wars
Date	8 May 1567
Location	near Letterkenny, Ulster, northwestern Ireland
Result	O'Donnell victory

Belligerents
Kingdom of Tyrone: Clan O'Neill	Kingdom of Tyrconnell: Clan O'Donnell

Commanders and leaders
Shane O'Neill	Hugh MacManus

Strength
c. 2,000	c. 2,000

Casualties and losses
600–1,300 killed	Low

The Battle of Farsetmore was fought near Letterkenny in County Donegal, north-western Ireland, on 8 May 1567, between the O'Neill and O'Donnell Túath. Shane O'Neill, chief of the O'Neills of Tír Eoghain, was defeated by Aodh mac Maghnusa Ó Domhnaill (Hugh O'Donnell), and the O'Donnells freed themselves from O'Neill aspirations of ruling Ulster as its King.

== Background ==
Shane O'Neill had, in the previous 20 years, eliminated his rivals within the O'Neills and asserted his authority over neighbouring clans (or "septs"), the MacDonnells of Antrim, in battle and O'Donnells, by kidnapping the O'Donnell leader Calvagh, in Donegal. In 1566, the English Lord Deputy of Ireland, Henry Sidney, gave support to the O'Donnells by ransoming the long-tortured Calvagh O'Donnell, against O'Neill, who was regarded as a destabilising and anti-English power in the north of Ireland. O'Neill forced out these English troops, but the new O'Donnell chieftain, Hugh O'Donnell, who took over after the long-tortured Calvagh died, took the opportunity to assert his independence and raided O'Neill's lands at Strabane. In response, O'Neill mustered his armed forces and marched into O'Donnell territory.

== Battle ==
O'Neill crossed into Tir Connell (O'Donnell territory) the traditional way by crossing the River Swilly at an Fearsaid mhór (known as Porterfields today); this is about 3 km (2 mi) east of the modern town of Letterkenny. O'Donnell had advance warning of this impending incursion, so he prepared for the forthcoming attack by dispatching messengers to all his people. Both sides were not equal in size. O'Neill's army is estimated at 2,000 men and was composed of Cavalry (Nobility), Gallowglass, Kern, and a small body of English soldiers who had deserted to him to provide modern weapon skills to his host. O'Donnell's initial forces were only about 40-foot and 80 horse (his personal guard).

O'Donnell's horsemen harassed O'Neill's men immediately after his fording of the river, leaving O'Donnell a short breathing space to locate his small force in a more defensible position, at Magherennan (near the entrance to the Letterkenny Rugby Club today). When their lord was in position, the O'Donnell cavalry withdrew, and there O'Donnell awaited his reinforcements. While his opponent waited, O'Neill set up his camp in Cluain Aire beside the River to cover the ford. When finally O'Donnell's troops did arrive, they numbered 400 Gallowglass from all the MacSweeney septs. With this virtual parity in the (usually) decisive heavy infantry, the O'Donnell host proceeded to advance on O'Neill's camp. Shane, when first perceiving their attack, said:

It is very wonderful and amazing to me that those people should not find it easier to make full concessions to us, and submit to our awards, than thus come forward to us to be immediately slaughtered and destroyed.’

— O'Neill, Annals of the Four Masters, p. 1615

This statement, made just as the armies met, must have been a late attempt to put heart into his own surprised army. Significantly, the main O'Donnell war host had employed rising ground to successfully cover their advance until it was far too late for O'Neill to deploy his own Gallowglass spars into a proper line of battle to hold the enemy while the O'Neill horse mounted up. The O'Neill army were caught utterly unprepared, in much the same way as O'Neill himself had taken a MacDonnell host by surprise at Glentaisie in 1565. Despite the element of surprise and O'Neill's lack of manoeuvre room, the resistance of the surprised O'Neill Gallowglass in this encounter battle was at first successful, for the Four Masters state that the action lasted "for a long time." Eventually, with their loose protective screen of gallowglass cut down, a panicked rout of Shane's force ensued. The O'Donnell pressure of attack continued so fiercely that the broken O'Neill host was forced back on the ford and attempted to recross the Swilly. As the tide was now coming in, many of them simply drowned in the speeding rush of waters 4–7 knots (7.4–13.0 km/h; 4.6–8.1 mph) average). O'Neill's losses are estimated by their enemies at 1,400 men killed, and no prisoners are mentioned, although the English sources note a more credible total of 680 dead. With many of his most senior commanders and advisors killed amid the chaos of the first onslaught, O'Neill himself escaped the final slaughter with the timely aid of a party of the Gallaghers. They guided him to Ath an Tairsi (Ford of protection) near Crieve Smith in Oldtown today (not to be confused with Scarrifholis, which is further up the river) where they escorted him to his own territory and relative safety.

== Aftermath ==
Many of the Donnelleys, Shane's foster family and the source of his strongest support, had defended him to the last and were decimated at Farsetmore. Abandoned by his tanisté and all of his Urríthe, literally under-kings, and with the destruction of his army, the 'most powerful force Gaelic Ireland had yet witnessed', Shane began looking for a mercenary force to sustain him until he could make good his losses. With all other options closed, he turned to a warband hired to fight against him the previous winter by William Piers from among the MacDonalds of Dunnyveg. He arrived at their camp at Cushendun with a small retinue. During their negotiations, an altercation occurred, in which Shane was killed. Despite being engineered by Piers, this assassination has gone down in history as retribution for Shane's military action against the MacDonalds in 1565. Shane was buried in a place called CrossSkern Church at Ballyterrim townland in the hills above Cushendun, later his remains were exhumed, his head then being sent to Dublin.

== Sources ==
- G.A. Hayes McCoy, Irish Battles, (Belfast 1989).
- Tomás Ó Brógáin, 'The battue of the Swilly (Farsetmore), 8 May 1567', History Ireland, Vol.XIX Issue 3 (May/June 2011), pp. 16–18.
