= Melaghlin O'Donnell =

King of Tyrconnell

Melaghlin O'Donnell (Irish: Maol Seachlainn Ó Domhnaill) was king of Tyrconnell and a member of the O'Donnell dynasty. He was a son of Donall Mor O'Donnell (Domhnall Mór Ó Domhnaill), king of Tyrconnell (died 1241), a man who was married to Lassarina (Lasairfhíona), daughter of Cathal Crobhdhearg Ó Conchobhair, King of Connacht. Melaghlin had two brothers: Goffraid (died 1257) and Donall Og (died 1281). Melaghlin died in 1247.

== Reign ==
In 1245, O'Donnell ravaged north Connacht. The following year, Maurice FitzGerald invaded Tyrconnell, seizing several hostages and secured them within Sligo Castle. The year afterwards, O'Donnell counter-attacked FitzGerald, and the hostages were killed in retaliation.

In 1247, FitzGerald invaded Tyrconnell again, and was halted at Ballyshannon by the combined forces of Cenél Conaill and Cenél nEógain. When Cormac O'Connor (Ó Conchobhair) forded the River Erne and came upon O'Donnell's combined forces from the rear, and O'Donnell fell in the resulting battle of Ballyshannon.

Following O'Donnell's death, FitzGerald installed Rory O'Cannon (Ruaidhrí Ó Cannanáin) as king of Tyrconnell. The latter, however, was later repulsed and slain by Goffraid O'Donnell.

O'Donnell is the subject of a contemporary elegy composed by Giolla Brighde Mac Con Midhe (died c. 1272).
