= Calvagh O'Donnell =

Irish king (1515–1566)

Calvagh O'Donnell Calbhach Ó Domhnaill
- King of Tyrconnell
- Tenure: 1563–1566
- Predecessor: Manus O'Donnell
- Successor: Sir Hugh McManus O'Donnell
- Born: c. 1515; Tyrconnell, Ireland
- Died: 26 October 1566 (aged about 51); Tyrconnell, Ireland
- Father: Manus O'Donnell
- Mother: Joan O'Reilly

Calvagh O'Donnell (Irish: Calbhach Ó Domhnaill; c. 1515 – 26 October 1566), eldest son of Manus O'Donnell, was an Irish King of Tyrconnell of the mid-16th century. He was king and chief of the O'Donnell dynasty based in Tyrconnell in western Ulster. He is best known for his conflict with Shane O'Neill – a dispute that involved the intervention of the English government in Ireland on Calvagh's side.

== Life ==
Calvagh O'Donnell was the eldest son of Manus O'Donnell by his first wife, Joan O'Reilly. In the course of a quarrel with his father and his half-brother Hugh, Calvagh sought aid in Scotland from the Campbells, who with access to Scottish royal artillery were able to assist him in deposing Manus and securing the now very divided lordship of Tyrconnell for himself.

Hugh then appealed to Shane O'Neill, chief of the neighbouring O'Neill dynasty, to restore him at Calvagh's expense. Shane accordingly invaded Tyrconnell at the head of a large army in 1557, desiring to make himself supreme throughout Ulster, and encamped on the shore of Lough Swilly.

Calvagh, acting apparently on the advice of his father, who was his prisoner and who remembered the successful night attack on Conn O'Neill, 1st Earl of Tyrone, at Knockavoe in 1522, surprised the O'Neills in their camp at night and routed them with the loss of all their spoils.

Calvagh had at least two marriages, both reflecting his family's alliance with the Earls of Argyll. By 1555, and perhaps as early as 1540, Calvagh was married to a daughter of the 4th Earl of Argyll whose name may have been Janet and who may have been the mother of his son, Conn. By 30 May 1561 Calvagh was married to his last wife, Catherine Maclean, widow of the 4th Earl.

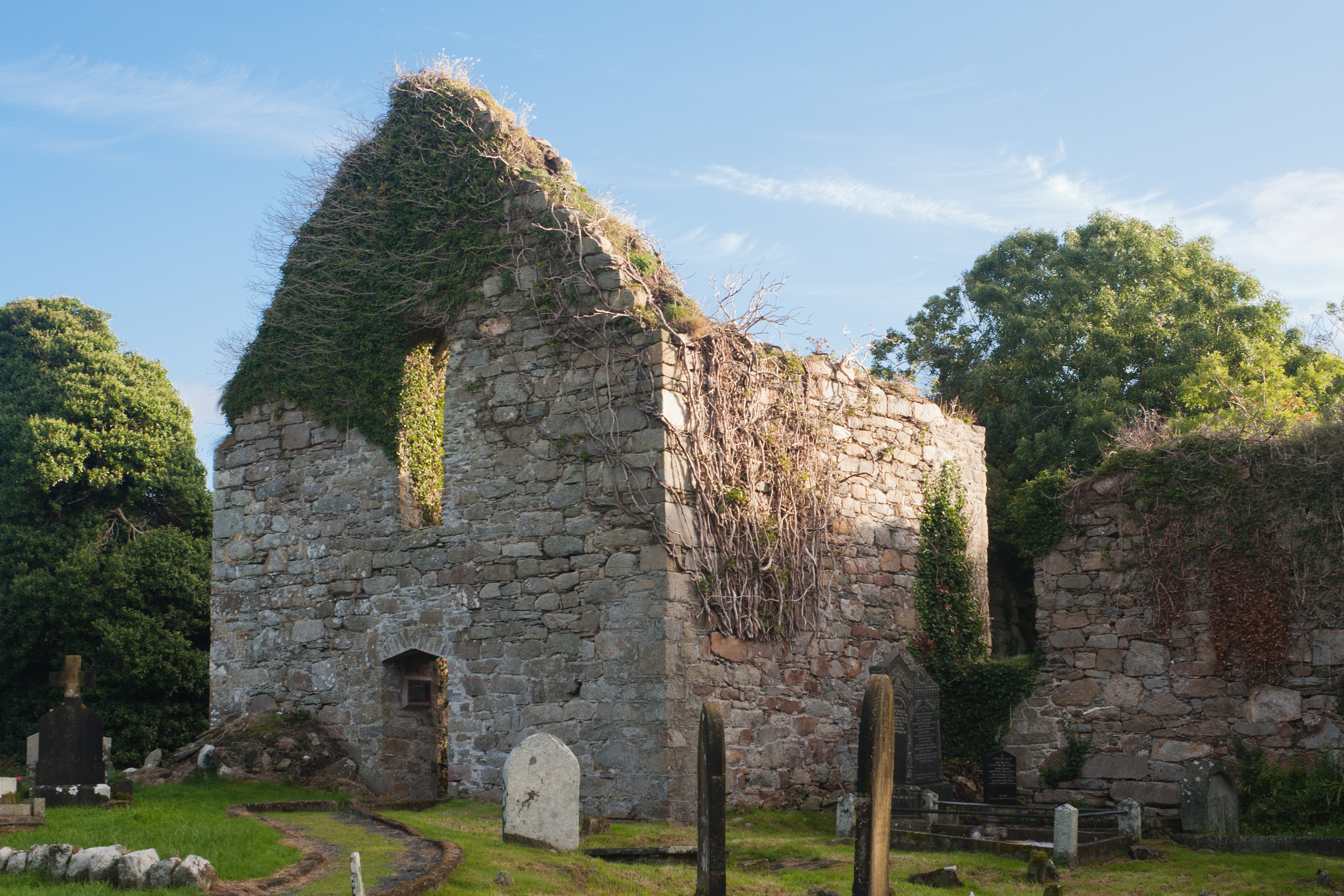
Killydonnell Friary at the western shore of Lough Swilly where Calvagh and his wife were captured in 1561 by Shane O'Neill

Calvagh was then recognized by the English government as lord of Tyrconnell; but in 1561 he and his wife were kidnapped by Shane O'Neill in the Franciscan friary of Killydonnell. His wife had previously been the wife of the Earl of Argyll, was kept by Shane O'Neill as his mistress and bore him several children. Sources differ as to the level of ill-treatment she endured by her captor; as she divorced Calvagh and married Shane immediately upon their release. Calvagh himself was subjected to atrocious torture during the three years that he remained O'Neill's prisoner, complete with being held in a metal cage at the front of O'Neill's castle in Dungannon, Tyrone. He was released in 1564 on conditions which he had no intention of fulfilling; and crossing to England he threw himself on the mercy of Queen Elizabeth.

In 1566 Sir Henry Sidney by the queen's orders marched to Tyrconnell and restored Calvagh to his rights. On 26 October, in the midst of his cavalry, Calvagh suddenly fell dead from his horse on the public road between Baile-aghaidh-chaoin and the church of Rath. As his son Conn was a prisoner in the hands of Shane O'Neill, his half-brother Hugh MacManus was inaugurated The O'Donnell in his place. Hugh, who in the family feud with Calvagh had allied himself with O'Neill, now turned round and combined with the English to crush the hereditary enemy of his family; and in 1567 he utterly routed Shane at the battle of Farsetmore near Letterkenny with the loss of 1300 men, compelling him to seek refuge with the MacDonnells of Antrim, by whom he was treacherously put to death.

== Descendants ==
In 1592 Hugh abdicated in favour of his son Hugh Roe O'Donnell; but there was a member of the elder branch of the family who resented the passing of the chieftainship to the descendants of Manus O'Donnell's second marriage. This was Niall Garve, second son of Calvagh's son Conn. His elder brother was Hugh of Ramelton, whose son John, an officer in the Spanish army, was the father of Hugh Baldearg O'Donnell (d. 1704), known in Spain as Count O'Donnell, who commanded an Irish regiment as a brigadier in the Spanish service. This officer came to Ireland in 1690 and raised an army in Ulster for the service of James II in the Williamite war in Ireland, afterwards deserting to the side of William III, from whom he accepted a pension.
