= Jean Louis Barthélemy O'Donnell =

Comte Jean Louis Barthelemy O'Donnell (1783–1836), was born in Maine-et-Loire, France, and was a Hiberno-French count who survived the French Revolution, campaigned in Italy and Spain under Napoleon Bonaparte, and played a prominent role in local government in France. He was also a member of the Conseil d'État and the Légion d'honneur.

On 15 April 1817, he married Élisa-Louise Gay (1800–1841), daughter of Jean Sigismond Gay (1768–1822) in Paris, and adopted by the latter's second wife, Marie Françoise Sophie Nichault de la Valette (1776–1852), who came from a family ruined by the Revolution. With Élisa-Louise, Comte O'Donnell had two sons, Gustave Anatole O'Donnell (1818–1824), and Sigismond Anatole O'Donnell (1823–1879), who married Jeanne Marthe Marie de Pechpeyrou Comminges de Guitaut, of the Marquis d'Époisses. His mother-in-law, known also as Sophie Gay or Mme. Sigismond, held salons for the rising elite of the "Restauration", frequented by France's greatest writers and artists. She lived at Villiers-sur-Orge, just south of Paris, in the Maison-Rouge, where they moved in 1813, and where Élisa-Louise and Sophie's own three children grew up. This was also where Comte O'Donnell courted Élisa-Louise, and established their family, after his military service. She was also a correspondent of Honoré de Balzac, sending him poems that she had coaxed her half-sister Delphine to write.

== Career ==
At the age of sixteen, he joined the staff command of General Clarck, upon the departure of Napoleon Bonaparte, then First Consul, for the Marengo campaign, where French forces defeated the Austrian army on 14 June 1800, forcing them to withdraw from Italy west of Ticino. His later political and administrative education flourished as a student of Alexandre Theodore Victor, Comte de Lameth, with whom he formed a very close friendship. Lameth was a young nobleman who served in the American Revolutionary War of Independence, became a French revolutionary but later aligned with Napoleon under the Empire, and the Bourbons under the French Restoration.

Nominated in 1809, O'Donnell was appointed Auditeur to the Conseil d'État on 19 January 1810, with special responsibility for bridges and highways. As an auditeur in extraordinary service, he was sent on a mission to the French army in the north of Spain from 1811 to 1813, and was sent as an intendant to Vittoria. He became successively super-intendant of the provinces of Alava, Biscay, and Guipúzcoa in the Basque region of northern Spain, and later in Valladolid. He was promoted to auditeur 1st class in 1812. After the return of the French army from Spain, he was recalled to the general staff of the Emperor, and remained in service in France until the abdication of Emperor Napoleon at Fontainebleau.

He was a career military man, and later Mâitre des Requêtes in the Conseil d'État, and a conseiller (counselor) in the Cour des Comptes, where he brought democratic constitutional principles inculcated under Lameth, and true to which he remained throughout his life. He fell from favour under the ultra-Royalist administration of the Jean-Baptiste, comte de Villèle, the Prime Minister of France from 1821–1828, and during which time largely he concentrated on local government, being Maire (Mayor) of Villiers-sur-Orge for seven years from 1820 to 1826, and was one of the founders of the l'Ecole d'enseignement mutuel (primary school) in Montlhéry, where using his own resources, he had several young pupils educated. During his administration, he accomplished an extension of the communal road network to rejoin the main Orléans-Paris road. After the revolution of 1830, he was restored to his former post as a Mâitre des Requêtes in the Conseil d'État. He was the Commissioner charged with public health surveillance in Paris in April 1832 during the cholera pandemic that swept Europe from 1831 onwards. Comte O'Donnell published a seminal work on the Code Vicinal, in 1836.

His biographers characterised him as energetic, and firm, yet without being rigorous, but rather flexible with the unknown. He undertook his frequently arduous duties with moderation and humanity, qualities of fine character, and his service amongst the notables of the Conseil d'État was marked as particularly distinguished.

== Society ==
In his own right, he was also a literary figure, and well-connected in the literary, social, and court circles of the day. His sister-in-law was Delphine, renowned as Mme. de Girardin (1804–1855), a literary figure, like her mother, and also close to the famous Madame De Staël during the Napoleonic Empire, and a prolific poet, one of whose poems "La Tour du Prodige" was dedicated to her nephew Gustave O'Donnell, Comte O'Donnell's first-born son, who died aged six, and another "Le Retour" to her half-sister, Comtesse O'Donnell.
