= Ballyshannon Castle =

Demolished castle in Ireland

Coordinates: 54°30′05″N 8°11′24″W

Ballyshannon Castle was a castle at Ballyshannon, County Donegal, Ireland. The castle was a stronghold of the O’Donnell clan. No visual remains of the castle exist above ground.

== History ==
Niall Garbh Ó Domhnaill built Ballyshannon Castle in 1423 to command the ford over the River Erne. The castle was captured and sacked by Conn Bacach O'Neill, Earl of Tyrone in 1522. Sir Conyers Clifford’s army was repelled by Hugh Roe O'Donnell after the castle was besieged for three days during the battle of Ballyshannon in 1597. The castle was transferred to Henry Folliot after the decline of the O’Donnell’s fortunes in 1606.

The castle was demolished in 1720 and a cavalry barracks built in its place. By the early 20th century, its site had been converted into a market yard to sell farm produce.
