= O'Clery =

O'Clery is a surname, and may refer to:

- Conor O'Clery, Irish journalist and writer
- Helen O'Clery (1910–2006), Irish writer of children's books
- Keyes O'Clery (1849–1913) - The O'Clery - Irish barrister and Home Rule politician

== See also ==
- Ó Cléirigh
