= Hugh Roe O'Donnell (died 1505) =

Hugh Roe O'Donnell I Aodh Ruadh mac Néill Gairbh Ó Domhnaill
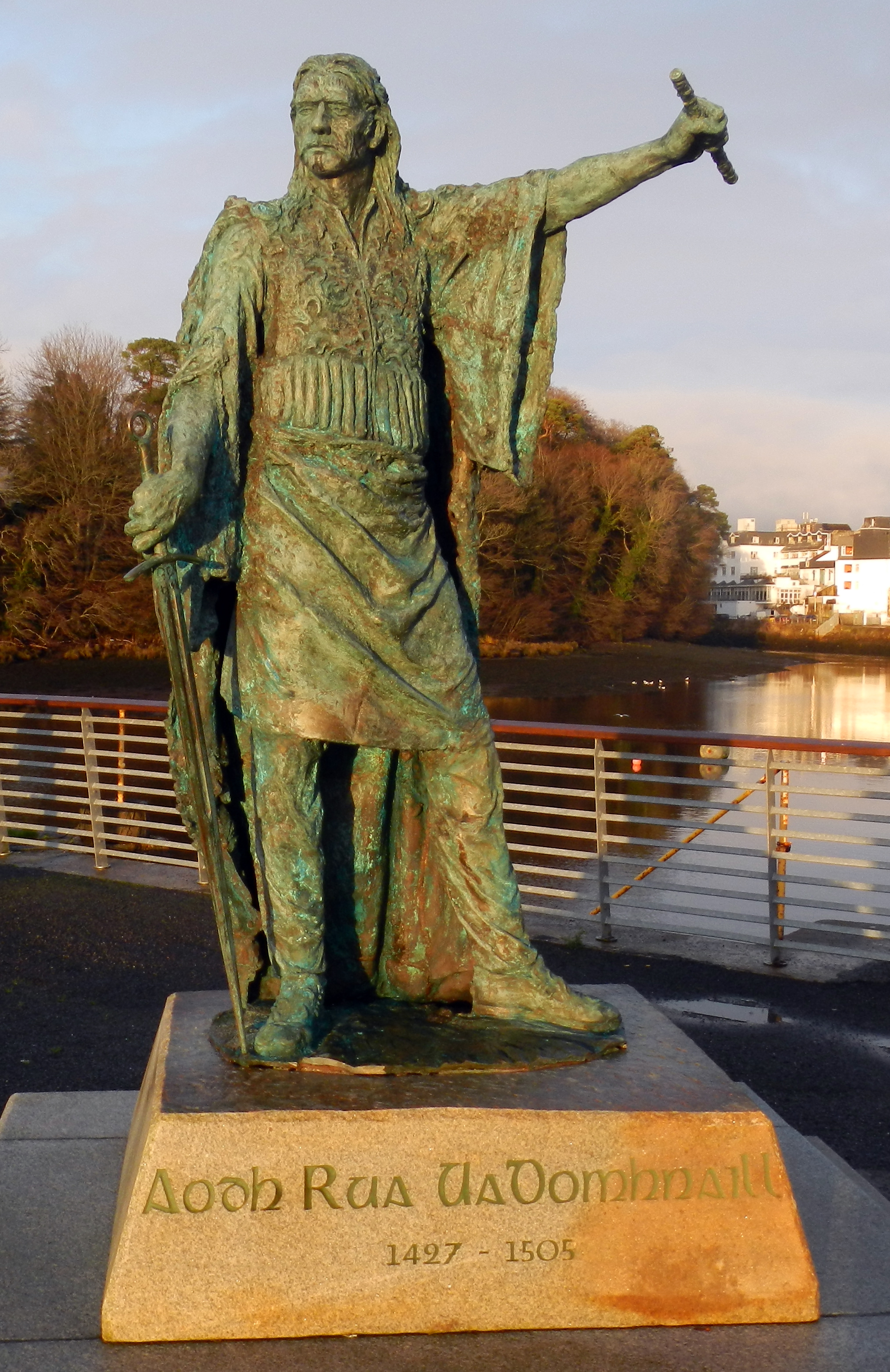
- Statue of O'Donnell in Donegal

King of Tyrconnell
- Reign: 1461–1505
- Coronation: 1461
- Predecessor: Naughton O'Donnell
- Successor: Hugh Duff O'Donnell
- Born: c. 1427; Tyrconnell, Ireland
- Died: 11 July 1505 (aged 78); Donegal Castle, Tyrconnell, Ireland
- Burial: Donegal Abbey
- Issue: Sir Aodh Dubh Ó Domhnaill
- House: O'Donnell dynasty
- Father: Niall Garv O'Donnell
- Mother: Nuala O’Conor

Hugh Roe O'Donnell I (Irish: Aodh Ruadh mac Néill Gairbh Ó Domhnaill; c. 1429 – 11 July 1505) was an Irish nobleman. As head of the O'Donnell dynasty, he ruled the Gaelic kingdom of Tyrconnell (which encompassed present-day County Donegal from 1461 to 1505.

A statue of O'Donnell was unveiled in Donegal on 13 September 2007.

== Biography ==
Hugh Roe O'Donnell was born circa 1429. His father was Niall Garv O'Donnell. Hugh Roe O'Donnell visited Dublin in 1464 to submit to the royal authorities. He remained a strong supporter of the Yorkist cause, and supported the claims of the pretender Perkin Warbeck against the Tudors. By 1496 he repented his actions, along with other Gaelic kings and lords who had supported Warbeck.

He died on 11 July 1505 and was succeeded in Tyrconnell by his son, Sir Aodh Dubh Ó Domhnaill, who was also considered a strong ruler who increased the lineage's power into northern Connaught and enjoyed the support of the Crown authorities in Dublin. Together their reigns are sometimes considered a "golden age" for the O'Donnells, when compared to the violent succession disputes that followed in the later 1500s.

== Overviews ==
Tír Connell, which between the 1460s and 1550s was the most powerful lordship north of the escir Riada. At its height, Uí Domhnaill kings exercised an imperium over what are now nine modern Irish counties, from Antrim to Mayo, with influence stretching to scotland, england, and the continent. Aodh Ruadh Ó Domnaill (r. 1461-1505) was the earl of Kildare's major ally at Knockdoe in 1504, and de facto King of The North.

[Tír Connell] was not a depressed economic region in late medieval times. [It was] famous for its vast herds of cattle and flocks of sheep, as well as large unenclosed areas sown with oats. The uplands and the rugged western coastlands were then largely uninhabited, providing its lowland inhabitants with booley pastures, turf banks, large woodlands and extensive reserves of all types of wild game. Rivers and sheltered inlets were also a very valuable natural resource, giving salmon, eel, oyster and seal fisheries. Many sheltered bays attracted large numbers of foreign merchants and fishermen exploiting an immensely valuable salmon and herring fishery, which developed during the course of the early sixteenth century into one of the biggest of its kind in europe. [It] had long and well-established trading links with ports such as Bristol … st Malo and Morlaix in Brittany … Galway and Drogheda. (Mac Eiteagáin, 1995, pp. 203-28)

== Obituary ==
O Domhnaill Aodh Ruadh mac Néill Gairbh mic Toirrdhealbhaigh an Fhíona ticcherna Tíre Conaill, Insi h-Eoghain, Cenél Moain, & Iochtair Chonnacht fer dár ghiallattar Fir Manach, Oirghialla, Clann Aodha Buidhe, an Rúta & Cathánaigh, Ro ghiallsat dna Goill, & Gaoidhil Connacht ó Mac Uilliam Cloinne Riocaird anuas dó, & gidh eisidhe ann do dhioghail Ó Domhnaill a anumhla fair a leithre dol ina dhúthaigh dá aimhdheóin co meinic cona baí aen cethraimhe fherainn ó Shuca anuas & o Sliabh O n-Aedha don taoíbh thiar nach raibhe fó chíoschain d' Ua Dhomhnaill. An t-Ua Domhnaill-si tra escca iomlan einigh & uaisle an Tuaisceirt, fer bá mó grenn, & gaiscceadh, fer bá ferr ionnsaicchidh & anadh, fer rob ferr smacht, reacht, & riaghail baí i n-Erinn ina aimsir do Gaoidhealaibh, ar ní déntaoí do choimhéd i t-Tir Chonaill ré a linn acht iadhadh dorais na gaoithe nama, fer bá ferr do chiond ecclaisi, & eiccsi, fer ro thiodhlaic almsana aidhble i n-onóir an choimdhe na n-dul, fer las ro turccbhadh & las ro cumhdaighedh caislén cétus i n-Dun na n-Gall fó daigh gomadh inneoin fhosaighthi dia clannmaicne ina dheadhaidh, & mainistir bhrathar De obseruantia i t-Tír Conaill .i. Mainistir Dhúin na n-Gall, fer lasa n-dearnadh iliomat do chreach-sluaighedhaibh timchill fó Erinn, fer dár díles August Iarthair Thuaisceirt Eorpa do rádh fris, d'fhaghail bháis iar m-buaidh ó dhomhan & o dhemhan, iar n-ongadh, & iar n-aithrighe tocchaighe ina longport fein i n-Dún na n-Gall dia h-aoíne do shonnradh isin cuíccidh íd Iulii, isin ochtmadh bliadhain sechtmoghat a aoisi, & isin cethramhadh bliadhain cethrachat a fhlatha, & a adhnacal i Mainistir Dúin na n-Gall.

O'Donnell, Hugh Roe, the son of Niall Garv, son of Turlough of the Wine, Lord of Tirconnell, Inishowen, Kinel-Moen, and Lower Connaught, died; a man who had obtained hostages from the people of Fermanagh, Oriel, Clannaboy, and the Route, and from the O'Kanes, and also the English and Irish of Connaught, with the exception of Mac William of Clanrickard, who, however, did not go unrevenged for his disobedience, for O'Donnell frequently entered his territory, and left not a quarter of land from the River Suck upwards, and from Sliabh O n-Aedha westwards, which he did not make tributary to him. This O'Donnell was the full moon of the hospitality and nobility of the North, the most jovial and valiant, the most prudent in war and peace, and of, the best jurisdiction, law, and rule, of all the Gaels in Ireland in his time; for there was no defence made of the houses in Tirconnell during his time, except to close the door against the wind only; the best protector of the Church and the learned; a man who had given great alms in honour of the Lord of the Elements; the man by whom a castle was first raised and erected at Donegal, that it might serve as a sustaining bulwark for his descendants; and a monastery for Friars de Observantiâ in Tirconnell, namely, the monastery of Donegal; a man who had made many predatory excursions around through Ireland; and a man who may be justly styled the Augustus of the North-west of Europe. He died, after having gained the victory over the Devil and the world, and after Extreme Unction and good Penance, at his own fortress in Donegal, on Friday, the 5th of the Ides of July, in the seventy-eighth year of his age, and forty-fourth of his reign, and was interred in the monastery of Donegal.

== Bibliography ==
- Annals of the Four Masters. CELT: Corpus of Electronic Texts. 2008 [1636].
- Ellis, Steven G. (1998). Ireland in the Age of the Tudors, 1447-1603: English Expansion and the End of Gaelic Rule. Routledge. ISBN 978-1-317-90143-3.
- Martyn, Adrian (2016). The Tribes of Galway. Adrian Martyn. ISBN 9780995502505.
- O'Byrne, Emmett (October 2009). "O'Donnell (Ó Domhnaill), Aodh Ruadh". Dictionary of Irish Biography. doi:10.3318/dib.006333.v1.
