= Manus O'Donnell =

Irish lord (died 1564)

- King of Tyrconnell
- Tenure: 1537–1555
- Predecessor: Hugh Duff O'Donnell
- Successor: Calvagh O'Donnell
- Born: 1490; Ireland
- Died: 9 February 1563 (aged ~73); Lifford, Tyrconnell, Ireland
- Father: Hugh Duff O'Donnell

Manus O'Donnell (Irish: Maghnas Ó Domhnaill or Manus Ó Domhnaill; 1490 – 9 February 1563) was a Gaelic Irish lord and King of Tyrconnell. After his father Hugh Dubh's death in 1537, Manus succeeded as Tyrconnell's ruler. In 1555 he was imprisoned and deposed by his son Calvagh, who effectively took over the kingdom's leadership. Manus died during his imprisonment in Lifford.

== Early life ==
Manus O'Donnell was born in 1490 into the O'Donnell clan, a Gaelic Irish noble family which ruled Tyrconnell, a kingdom geographically associated with present-day County Donegal. Manus's father, Hugh Dubh (pronounced in Ulster Irish as 'Hugh Doo'), had been Rí (king) of the O'Donnells during one of the bitterest and most protracted of the feuds between his clan and the O'Neills, which in 1491 led to a war lasting more than ten years. Hugh Dubh left Manus to rule Tyrconnell, though still a boy, when he went on a pilgrimage to Rome in about 1511. On his return from Rome (via England, where he was knighted by King Henry VIII) in broken health after two years' absence, Manus, who had proved himself a capable leader in defending his country against the O'Neills, retained the chief authority. According to the Annals of the Four Masters, Manus was inaugurated by "the successors of St. Columbkille, with the permission and by the advice of the nobles of Tirconnell, both lay and ecclesiastical." When Sir Hugh Dubh O'Donnell, as he was now, appealed for aid against his son to the Maguires, Manus made an alliance with the O'Neills, by whose assistance he established his hold over Tyrconnell. But in 1522 the two great northern clans were again at war.

Conn Bacagh O'Neill, An Ó Néill (who was created The 1st Earl of Tyrone in 1542), was determined to bring the O'Donnells under his rule. Supported by Munster and Connacht, and assisted also by English contingents and by the MacDonnells of Antrim, O'Neill took the castle of Ballyshannon, and after devastating a large part of Tyrconnell he encamped at Knockavoe, near Strabane. Here he was surprised at night by Sir Hugh Dubh and Manus O'Donnell, and routed with the loss of 900 men and an immense quantity of booty in the Battle of Knockavoe. Although this was one of the bloodiest ever battles between the O'Neills and the O'Donnells, it did not end the war; and in 1531 O'Donnell applied to the Lordship of Ireland for protection, giving assurances of allegiance to King Henry VIII.

== Geraldine League ==
In February 1537, The 10th Earl of Kildare (previously known as Lord Offaly, and better known to history as 'Silken Thomas') and his five uncles were executed at Tyburn for their rebellion in Leinster. Following their executions, the English Crown made every effort to capture Gerald, 11th Earl of Kildare, the new head of the FitzGerald dynasty and the new claimant to the Earldom of Kildare, a boy of twelve who was in the secret custody of his aunt, Lady Eleanor McCarthy.

Lady Eleanor, in order to secure a powerful protector for the boy, accepted an offer of marriage from Manus O'Donnell, who on the death of Sir Hugh Dubh in July 1537 was inaugurated as "The O'Donnell". Conn O'Neill (later Earl of Tyrone) was a relative of the young Lord Kildare, and this event accordingly led to the formation of the short-lived Geraldine League, a federation including the O'Neills, the O'Donnells, the O'Briens of Thomond, and other powerful clans; the primary object of which was to restore young Lord Kildare to his lands, titles and properties, but which afterwards aimed at the complete overthrow of English rule in Ireland.

== Chief of the O'Donnells ==
In August 1539, O'Donnell and Conn O'Neill were heavily defeated by the Lord Deputy at Lake Bellahoe, in County Monaghan, which crippled their power for many years. In the west Manus made unceasing efforts to assert the supremacy of the O'Donnells in north Connacht, where he compelled O'Conor Sligo to acknowledge his over-lordship in 1539. In 1542 he went to England and presented himself, together with Conn O'Neill and other Irish chiefs, became a Protestant, and recognised Henry VIII, who promised to make him Earl of Tyrconnell, though he refused O'Donnell's request to be made Earl of Sligo. The assimilation process was known as "surrender and regrant".

By the early 1500s, O’Donnell was a significant patron of the arts in Ulster, and he took a particular interest in the trade and customs of the Continent. Rather than dressing in the ancient Gaelic styles, he adopted the fashion of contemporary Spanish noblemen. His dress was described in 1542 as “furnisht of other apparrail better than any Irishman, for at such time as he mette with me he was in a coat of crimoisin velvet with aiglettes of gold, twenty or thirty pair, over that a great doble cloke of right crimoisin satin, garded with black velvet, a bonnet with a feather set full of aiglettes of gold: that methough it strange to see him in so honorable an apparrail, and all the rest of his nacion that I have seen as yet, so vile”.

In his later years, Manus was troubled by quarrels between his sons Hugh and Calvagh; in 1555 he was imprisoned by Calvagh, who deposed him from all authority in Tyrconnell. Manus died in Lifford on 9 February 1563. Manus O'Donnell, though a fierce warrior, was hospitable and generous to the poor and the Church. He is described by the Four Masters as "a learned man, skilled in many arts, gifted with a profound intellect, and the knowledge of every science." At his castle of Portnatrynod near Strabane, he supervised, if he did not actually dictate, the writing of the Life of Saint Columbkille in Irish, which is preserved in the Bodleian Library (Rawlinson B 514) at Oxford. He was also a poet and many of his poems, written in Irish, survive.

== Family ==
Manus was married several times. His first wife, Joan O'Reilly, was the mother of Calvagh, and two daughters, both of whom married O'Neills; the younger, Margaret, was the wife of the famous rebel Shane O'Neill. His second wife, Hugh's mother, by whom he was an ancestor of the Earls of Tyrconnell (see below), was Judith, sister of Conn Bacach O'Neill, 1st Earl of Tyrone, and aunt of Shane.

== See also ==
- Cruithnechán
