= Conall Gulban =

Irish king (died c. 464)

Conall Gulban (died c. 464) was an Irish king and eponymous ancestor of the Cenél Conaill, who founded the kingdom of Tír Chonaill in the 5th century, comprising much of what is now County Donegal in Ulster. He was the son of Niall Noígiallach.

His by-name Gulban derives from Benn Ghulbain in the north of modern-day County Sligo, from which centre the sons of Niall set out upon their conquest of the North. King Conall Gulban was murdered by the Masraige at Magh Slécht in Tullyhaw in what later became Bréifne (Tullyhaw is now a barony in the west of modern-day County Cavan) in 464, on a Friday. He was buried by Saint Caillín at Fenagh in the south of modern-day County Leitrim. He is important in the history of Irish Christianity as he was the first nobleman baptised by Saint Patrick, thus opening the way for the conversion of the ruling classes of Ireland.

He appears as a host and companion of Caílte mac Rónáin, one of the central Fianna figures in the tale Acallam na Senórach (Colloquy of the Ancients) who survive into Christian times and recounts tales of the Fianna and the meaning of place names to a recently arrived Saint Patrick. Caílte performs the same function to Conall in Tír Conaill and uncovers the treasures of the Fianna from the various megalithic tombs of its members on their journeys.

He was apparently very close to his brother Eógan mac Néill who died of grief over his brother's death the next year.

His sons included Fergus Cendfota, Dauí (founder of the Cenél nDuach) and Énna Bogaine (founder of the Cenél mBogaine).

== Descendants ==
His descendants were known as the Cenél Conaill. Their territory Tir Conaill was organised as the Diocese of Raphoe in 1111 at the Synod of Ráth Breasail. It did not at that time include the Inishowen peninsula.

The peninsula of Inishowen in the north of County Donegal was taken from the McLoughlins by the Cenél Conaill Ó Dochartaigh clan (known modernly as Doherty, Daugherty, Docherty, Dougherty, etc.) who were then given the title of Princes of Donegal, or Tir Conaill. This family also descends from Conall.

The Cenél nEógain, descended from his brother Eoghan, became the other premier Uí Néill sept in the North. Their kingdom was known as Tír Eógain. Modern day County Tyrone shares both its name and much of its territory. Its respective royal dynasties, the Kings of Tir Connaill and the Kings of Tír Eógain. Its last de jure native rulers fled abroad in the episode known as the Flight of the Earls but, as with all the major Irish kingships, the line of descent continues into the present day.

== Cenél Conaill ==
   Niall Noígiallach, died c. A.D.455.
   |
   |______________________________________________________________________________
   |               |              |          |               |                   |
   |               |              |          |               |                   |
   Conall Gulban Eoghan        Coirpre    Fiacha    Conall Cremthainne        Lóegaire
   |               |              |          |               |                   |
   |               |              |          |               |                   |
   |        Cenél nEógain         |    Cenél Fiachach        |           Cenél Lóegaire
   |                              |                          | 
   |                         Cenél Cairpre                  / \
   |                                                       /   \
   |                                                      /     \
   |                                          Clann Cholmáin     Síl nÁedo Sláine 
   |
  Cenél Conaill of In Fochla
   |
   |_______________________________________________
   |                  |                           |
   |                  |                           |
   Fergus Cennfota    Doi                         Enna Bogaine 
   |                 (Cenél nDuach)              (Cenél mBogaine)
   |                  |                           |
   |                  |                           |
   |                  Ninnid, fl. 561           Melge 
   |                  |                           |
   |                  |                           |
   |                  Baetan, d. 586            Brandub
   |                                              |
   |_________                                     ?
   |        |                                     |
   |        |                                   Garban 
   Setna    Feidlimid                             | 
   |        |                                     |
   |        |                                   Sechnasach, Rí Cenél mBogaine, d. 609
   |        Columb Cille, 521-597                 |
   |_______________________________               |______________
   |                     |        |               |             |
   |                     |        |               |             |
   Ainmire, d. 569   Colum    Lugaid          Mael Tuile    Bresal, d. 644
   |                              |               |
   |                              |               |
   |                        Cenél Lugdach Dungal, Rí Cenél mBogaine, d. 672
   |                              |               |
   |                              |               |_____________
   |                            Ronan             |            |
   |                              |               |            |
   |                              |           Sechnasach      Dub Diberg, d. 703
   |                            Garb              |            |
   |                              |               ?            |
   |                              |               |           Flaithgus, d. 732
   |                              |           Forbasach        |
   |                              |       Rí Cenél mBogaine    ?
   |                          Cen Faelad     d. 722            |
   |                              |                           Rogaillnech, d. 815
   |       _______________________|
   |       |                      |
   |       |                      |
   |       Mael Duin          Fiaman
   |       |                       |
   |       ?                       ?
   |       |                       |
   |       Airnelach       Maenguile
   |       |                       |
   |       |                       | 
   |       |                       |
   |       |                       |
   |       Cen Faelad     Dochartach
   |       |           (Clann Ua Dochartaig)
   |       |
   |       |____________________________________________
   |       |                                           |
   |       |                                           |
   |       Dalach, 'Dux' Cenél Conaill,  d. 870.   Bradagain
   |       |                                           |
   |       |                                           |
   |       Eicnecan, Rí Cenél Conaill, d. 906      Baigill
   |       |                                     (Clann Ua Baighill)
   |       |
   |       |______________________________________________________________
   |       |   |         |           |                  |                |
   |       |   |         |           |                  |                |
   |       two sons    Flann      Adlann            Domnall Mor      Conchobar
   |    d. 956 & 962.          Abbot of Derry    (Clann Ua Domnaill)
   |                           d. 950.
   |
   |___________________
   |                  |
   |                  | 
   Aed, d. 598    Ciaran
   |                  |
   |                  |
   |                  Fiachra, founder of Derry, died 620.
   |
   |__________________________________________________________
   |                      |           |                      |
   |                      |           |                      |
   Domnall, d. 642    Conall Cu   Mael Cobo, d. 615  Cumuscach, d. 597
   High King of Ireland   d. 604  |
   |                                  |_____________
   |                                  |            |
   |                                  |            |
   |                                  Cellach      Conall Cael 
   |                                  |  both died  658/664
   |                                  |  
   |                               (Clann Ua Gallchobair)
   |
   |
   |________________________________________________________________
   |                      |           |           |                |
   |                      |           |           |                |
   Oengus, d. 650      Conall      Colgu   Ailill Flannesda  Fergus Fanat
   |                   d.663       d.663        d.666           d.654
   |                                                               |
   |                                                               |
   |                                                       Congal Cenn Magair 
   |                                                           d. 710
   |                                                               |
   |                                                     __________|__________ 
   |                                                     |         |          |
   |                                                     |         |          |
   |                                                   Donngal  Flann Gohan  Conaig
   |                                                d. 731  d.732 d.733
   |
   Loingsech, d. 703
   |
   |____________________________________________________________________
   |                                |                    |      |      |
   |                                |                    |      |      |
   Flaithbertach, deposed 734.  Fergus, d. 707   three other sons, all killed 703
   |
   |_____________________________________________________________________
   |                                                 |                  |
   |                                                 |                  |
   Aed Muinderg, Ri In Tuisceart, d. 747.     Loingsech          Murchad
   |                                           Rí Cenél Conaill   Rí Cenél Conaill 
   |_______________                                d. 754         d. 767
   |              |                                                     |
   |              |                                                     |
   Domnall      Donnchad                                            Mael Bresail
  d. 804   fl. 784                                        Rí Cenél Conaill 
   |                                                                d. 767
   |                                                                    |
   Flaithbertach                                                        |
   |                                                                  Oengus
   |                                                                    |
   Canannan                                                             |
  (Ua Canannain)                                                     Mael Doraid
                                                                   (Ua Maildoraid)
                                                                        |
                                                                 _______|_______
                                                                |               |
                                                                |               |
                                                            Fogartach      Mael Bresail
                                                        Rí Cenél Conaill Rí Cenél Conaill
                                                              d. 904         d. 901
