= Hugh Duff O'Donnell =

16th c King of Tyrconnell (IRE)

Sir Hugh Dubh O'Donnell (Irish: Sir Aodh Dubh Ó Domhnaill; died 5 July 1537) was a leading figure in Gaelic Ireland during the Tudor era. He was part of the ruling O'Donnell dynasty of Tyrconnell.

He was the son of Hugh Roe O'Donnell, King of Tyrconnell from 1461 to 1505 except for a brief period when his son Con O'Donnell, Hugh's eldest brother, came to power. Hugh succeeded his father in 1505, reigning till his death in 1537. He was succeeded by his own son Manus O'Donnell.

Like his father, Sir Hugh was a strong ruler who was able to keep the rival O'Neills in check and expanded O'Donnell power into northern Connaught. His rule saw the gradual development of an alliance between the O'Donnells and the Crown which would last for most of the century. Hugh fought alongside The 8th Earl of Kildare in Munster in 1510 (and may have taken part in the earlier Battle of Knockdoe). In 1511 he went on a pilgrimage to Rome, and was knighted by Henry VIII in London on the return journey. On 6 May 1531 he formally submitted to Henry VIII's representative in Ireland, Lord Deputy Sir William Skeffington, at Drogheda.

Amongst his great-grandchildren were Hugh Roe O'Donnell and Rory, 1st Earl of Tyrconnell, known for their roles in Tyrone's Rebellion and the Flight of the Earls respectively. He had at least five wives: at least one of them, Margery Darcy, daughter of Sir William Darcy of Platten, belonged to an Anglo-Irish family of the Pale.

== Obituary ==
O Domhnaill Aodh mac Aodha Ruaidh mic Neill Ghairbh mic Toirrdealbhaigh an Fhíona tigherna Tire Conaill Innsi h-Eocchain, Cenel Moain Fher Manach, & Iochtair Chonnacht, fer gus a t-tangattar comhtha, & cíos-chana ó thiribh oile chuicce fors m-baoí a smacht & a chumhachta amhail atá Magh Luircc, Machaire Connacht, Clann Chonnmaigh, Goisdealbhaigh, Gailengaigh, Tir Amhalgaidh, & Conmaicne Chúile don taobh thiar, & don taobh thoir bheós, Oirecht I Catháin, An Rúta & Clann Aodha Buidhe, ar ní bhaoí aon-tír díbh-sidhe nách t-tuccsat comhtha dó la taobh a chiosa cosanta d'íoc go h-umhal fris. Bá h-é an fer-so tra ro thabhaigh cartacha nuaa ar Inis Eocchain ar Cenel Moain, & ar Feraibh Manach (ar an c-cethrar tighernadha bátar réna linn i t-Tir Eoccain) do dhaingniucchadh ar na sen-chartachaibh baí accá shinnsearaibh ar na tíribh-sin ionnas co m-baoí a t-tighernas & a n-eirge amach co socair siothchanta aicce. Nír bhó machtnadh son óir ní facus a bhuaidh 'gá biodhbhaibh, & ní thard troicch teichidh ré n-uathadh ná ré sochaidhe, fer coisccthi dóighniomh & droch-bhés, fear mudhaighthi & malarta meirleach & m-bithbenach, fer dlúthaighthe rechta & riaghla iarna théchta, fer aga rabhattar síona iarna c-cóir fria reimhes gur bhó toirtheach turchurthach muir & tír ina fhlaith, fer las ro cuiredh gach aon ina thír for a dhuthaigh n-dilis budeisin coná baoí aincridhe neich dibh fria 'roile, fer na ro leicc nert Gall ina thir budhein uair ro chengail sídh & caradradh lé righ Saxan, o 'd-chonnairc ná tárdsat Gaoidhil cennas d'aon uaidhibh budein acht an t-aos cairdesa, & coimhfhialasa a f-fríthbhert fria 'roile, fer congmhala a neimhtenachais iarna chóir d'urdaibh & d'eccalsaibh, d'filedhaibh, & d'ollamhnaibh. An t-Ua Domnaill rémraite (Aodh mac Aodha Ruaidh) d'écc .5. Iulii dia dardaoín do shonradh i Mainistir Dúin na n-Gall iar n-dol i n-aibítt San Froinséis, iar c-caoí a chionadh & a thurgabhal iar n-aithrighe ina phecthoibh & tairmteachtaibh, & a adhnacal isin mainistir chédna co n-onóir & co n-airmidin móir amhail ro ba dír. Maghnus Ó Domhnaill d'oirdneadh ina ionadh lá comharbaibh Choluim Chille do ched & do comhairle maithe Cenél c-Conaill etir thuaith & ecclais.

O'Donnell (Hugh, the son of Hugh Roe, son of Niall Garv, son of Turlough of the Wine, Lord of Tirconnell, Inishowen, Kinel-Moen, Fermanagh, and Lower Connaught), died; he was a man to whom rents and tributes were paid by other territories over which he had extended his jurisdiction and power, such as Moylurg, Machaire-Chonnacht, Clann-Conway, Costello, Galleanga, Tirawly, and Conmaicne-Cuile, to the west; and to the east, Oireacht-Ui-Chathain, the Route, and Clannaboy; for of these there was not one territory that had not given him presents, besides his tribute of protections. It was this man also that compelled the four lords who ruled Tyrone during his time to give him new charters of Inishowen, Kinel-Moen, and Fermanagh, as a further confirmation of the old charters which his ancestors had held as proof of their title for these countries; so that he quietly and peaceably had lordship over them, and commanded their rising-out. This was not to be wondered at, for never was victory seen with his enemies, never did he retreat one foot from any army, small or great; he was the represser of evil deeds and evil customs, the destroyer and banisher of rebels and thieves, an enforcer of the laws and ordinances after the justest manner; a man in whose reign the seasons were favourable, so that sea and land were productive; a man who established every one in his country in his proper hereditary possessions, that no one of them might bear enmity towards another; a man who did not suffer the power of the English to come into his country, for he formed a league of peace and friendship with the King of England, when he saw that the Irish would not yield superiority to any one among themselves, but that friends and blood relations contended against one another; a man who duly protected their termon lands for the friars, churches, poets, and ollavs. The aforesaid O'Donnell (Hugh, the son of Hugh Roe) died on the 5th of July, being Wednesday, in the monastery of Donegal, having first taken upon him the habit of St. Francis, and having wept for his crimes and iniquities, and done penance for his sins and transgressions. He was buried in the same monastery with great honour and solemnity, as was meet; and Manus O'Donnell was inaugurated in his place by the successors of St. Columbkille, with the permission and by the advice of the nobles of Tirconnell, both lay and ecclesiastical.

== Bibliography ==
- Ellis, Steven G. Ireland in the Age of the Tudors, 1447-1603. Longman, 1998.
- Annals of the Four Masters. CELT: Corpus of Electronic Texts. 2008 [1636].
