= Siobhán O'Donnell =

Irish noblewoman (died 1591)

- Countess of Tyrone
- Born: Sixteenth century
- Died: January 1591
- Noble family: O'Donnell dynasty
- Spouse: Hugh O'Neill, Earl of Tyrone (m. 1574)
- Issue: Numerous, including Alice, Hugh and Henry
- Father: Hugh McManus O'Donnell
- Mother: Nuala O'Neill

Siobhán O'Donnell, Countess of Tyrone (Note: It is unclear whether or not Siobhán took her husband's surname.) (Irish: Siobhán Ní Domhnaill; died January 1591), sometimes anglicised Joanna, Joan, or Judith, was a sixteenth-century Irish noblewoman of the O'Donnell clan. She was the second wife of Hugh O'Neill, Earl of Tyrone, and bore him most of his children.

== Family background ==
Siobhán was the daughter of Hugh McManus O'Donnell, Lord of Tyrconnell. Her mother was Sir Hugh's first wife (not his second wife, Iníon Dubh). Historian Francis Martin O'Donnell has named Sir Hugh's first wife as "Nuala, a daughter of O’Neill", and states that she was the daughter of Shane O'Neill. Siobhán's mother had probably died by 1566.

Historian Helena Concannon believes Siobhán was born c. 1569, and that her mother was Iníon Dubh, whom her father married in 1569. However, Siobhán's marriage in 1574 makes that date of birth extremely unlikely.

Siobhán's most prominent full-sibling was Donal O'Donnell. He attempted to depose his father, and in September 1590's Battle of Doire Leathan, Donal was killed by Scottish Redshanks led by his step-mother Iníon Dubh. Siobhan's younger half-siblings included future clan chief Hugh Roe O'Donnell and Rory O'Donnell, 1st Earl of Tyrconnell.

== Marriage ==
From the late-1560s to early-1570s, Hugh O'Neill (then 3rd Baron Dungannon) allied with many neighbouring clans to strength his political position. Siobhán married Hugh in June 1574. Walter Devereux, 1st Earl of Essex, announced their marriage on 14 June. Hugh had annulled his first marriage earlier the same year, on the grounds of consanguinity. This was in order to cut ties with his first father-in-law, who had been arrested for treason.

In 1579, Hugh became frustrated with his failure to seize the title of The O'Neill from clan chief Turlough Luineach O'Neill. Hugh briefly repudiated his marriage to Siobhán, who had not yet born Hugh a male heir, and he prepared to wed a daughter of Turlough Luineach with the aim of becoming the O'Neill clan's tanist. In February 1579 it was reported that Hugh and Turlough "knit up such a league of friendship". However this alliance did not last long and the new marriage was called off. Hugh was bought off by a government commission who convinced Hugh that, due to Turlough's age and ill health, Turlough would probably die soon enough. This episode apparently convinced Hugh that his "fate was tied to that of O'Donnell" and he solidified his alliance with the O'Donnell clan by reconciling with Siobhán. However it is possible that his reconciliation with Siobhán was a calculated move to keep in the government's favour.

The O'Neill-O'Donnell clan alliance would develop further by 1587, by which time Siobhán's younger half-brother Hugh Roe was betrothed to Rose, O'Neill's daughter from an earlier marriage.

== Death ==
In a letter dated 31 January 1591, O'Neill informed Lord Burghley of Siobhán's recent death. He remarried to Anglo-Irish noblewoman Mabel Bagenal on 3 August 1591.

== Children ==
Siobhán and Hugh had two sons and multiple daughters:

- Margaret (fl. 1598) who married Richard Butler, 3rd Viscount Mountgarret sometime before 8 October 1596—possibly in October 1595.
- Sarah (fl. 1595–1602), (Note: Her death date has alternately been given as 1639, 26 April 1640, or sometime after 31 March 1642.) who married Sir Arthur Magennis, 1st Viscount Iveagh sometime before 4 March 1595 - possibly in 1590. Through Sarah, Siobhán is an ancestor to the Anglo-Irish Wellesley family.
- Mary (fl. 1608), who married Brian McHugh Og MacMahon. According to historian George Hill, she is the same woman who married Sir Ross McMahon.
- Alice (Note: Dunlop believes that her mother was Catherine Magennis. More recently, Casway and Cokayne believe her mother was Siobhan O'Donnell, which, based on Alice's birthdate, is more likely.) (1583 – c. 1665) who married Randal MacDonnell, 1st Earl of Antrim. She was younger than her sisters Sarah and Mary, and older than her brother Hugh.
- Hugh, 4th Baron Dungannon (c. 1585 – September 1609); he died in Rome and was buried in San Pietro in Montorio.
- Henry (c. 1586 – 1610); he became a colonel of an Irish regiment in the Archduke's army.

== Family tree ==
O'Donnell family tree

Issue of Hugh McManus O'Donnell (Aodh mac Maghnusa Ó Domhnaill; c. 1520 - 7 December 1600), son of Lord of Tyrconnell Manus O'Donnell (Maghnas Ó Domhnaill), and Judith O'Neill (Siobhán Ó Néill).

First marriage: Nuala O'Neill (likely dead by 1566), daughter of Shane O'Neill.

- Joanna O'Donnell (Siobhán Ní Domhnaill)
  - Died January 1591
    - Married Hugh O'Neill, Earl of Tyrone in June 1574 - marriage repudiated in 1579 - later reconfirmed
      - Margaret O'Neill (fl. c. 1596)
        - Married Richard Butler, 3rd Viscount Mountgarret shortly before 8 October 1596
      - Sarah O'Neill (fl. 1595–1602)
        - Married Sir Arthur Roe Magennis before 4 March 1595
      - Mary O'Neill (fl. 1608)
        - Married Brian McHugh Og MacMahon
      - Alice O'Neill (1583 – c. 1665)
        - Married Randal MacDonnell, 1st Earl of Antrim in 1604
      - Hugh O'Neill (c. 1585 – 24 September 1609)
      - Henry O'Neill (c. 1586 – 25 August 1610)
- Daughter (name unknown) (Note: Walsh, Paul (1922). Hugh Roe O'Donnell's Sisters. The Irish Ecclesiastical Record. XIX. Dublin: 358–364. p. 362.)
  - Married a son of Turlough Luineach O'Neill
- Duncan "Scaite" O'Donnell (Donnchadh Ó Domhnaill) (Note: Ó Domhnaill, Niall (1952). Na Glúnta Rosannacha. p. 87. The historicity of this person is disputed.)
- Rory O'Donnell (Ruaidhri Ó Domhnaill)
  - Died 1575
- Donal O'Donnell (Domhnall Ó Domhnaill)
  - Died 14 September 1590
    - Married a daughter of Turlough Lynagh O'Neill, c. 1588
    - Unknown woman
      - Donnell Oge O'Donnell (c. 1585 – 5 September 1620)

Second marriage, 1569: Fiona MacDonald (Fionnghuala Nic Dhomhnaill, also known as Iníon Dubh), daughter of James MacDonald, 6th of Dunnyveg and Agnes Campbell.

- Hugh Roe O'Donnell (Aodh Ruadh Ó Domhnaill)
  - Born c. 30 October 1572
  - Died 9 September 1602
    - Betrothed to Rose O'Neill by 1587; married in December 1592; separated in 1595; reconfirmed in 1597; divorced by 1598
- Rory O'Donnell (Rudhraighe Ó Domhnaill)
  - Born 1575
  - Died 28 July 1608
    - Married Bridget FitzGerald
      - Hugh Albert O'Donnell (c. October 1606 – 1 July 1642)
        - Married Anna-Margaret de Hénin in 1632
      - Mary Stuart O'Donnell (c. 1607 – after 1639)
        - Married Dualtach O'Gallagher after 1629
      - Some sources incorrectly suggest that they had an elder daughter named Elizabeth (see Elizabeth_Plunket#Errors in her genealogy)
- Nuala O'Donnell (Nuala Ní Domhnaill)
  - Born c. 1575
  - Died c. 1630
    - Married Niall Garve O'Donnell in 1591 - separated 1600
      - A son (c. 1596 – 1600)
    - Child of unknown paternity:
      - Grania O'Donnell (fl. 1607 - 1617)
    - Children of Niall Garve, possibly by Nuala:
      - Naghtan O'Donnell (died 1640)
      - Manus O'Donnell (died 5 June 1646)
      - George Hill mentions Naghtan having two younger brothers (see Niall_Garve_O'Donnell#Family)
- Manus O'Donnell (Maghnus Ó Domhnaill)
  - Born c. 1579
  - Died 22 October 1600
- Margaret O'Donnell (Mairghead Ní Domhnaill)
  - fl. 1607 – 1662 (Note: O'Donnell, Eunan (2006). Reflection on the Flight of the Earls. Donegal Annual (58): 31–44. pp. 37–38. Gráinne and Meadhb are known only as sisters of the Earl (i.e. Rory), with no additional information.) (Note: Walsh, Micheline Kerney (1996). An exile of Ireland, Hugh O'Neill, Prince of Ulster. Dublin: Four Courts Press. pp. 62–63)
    - Married Cormac MacBaron O'Neill
      - Brian Crossagh O'Neill (died 1615)
      - Art Oge O'Neill
- Mary O'Donnell (Máire Ní Domhnaill)
  - Died 1662
    - Married Donnell Ballagh O'Cahan in June 1593; separated 1598
      - Rory Oge O'Cahan
      - A daughter
    - Married Teigue O'Rourke in 1599
      - Brian O'Rourke (born 1599)
      - Hugh O'Rourke (born c. 1600)
- Caffar O'Donnell (Cathbarr Ó Domhnaill)
  - Born c. 1583
  - Died 15 September 1608
    - Married Rose O'Doherty
      - Hugh O'Donnell (c. June 1605 – 1625)
    - Relationship with an unmarried woman
      - Conn O'Donnell (fl. 1608–1629)
- Gráinne O'Donnell (Gráinne Ní Domhnaill)
- Meadhb O'Donnell (Meadhb Ní Domhnaill) (Note: Walsh, Paul (1929). The Book of O'Donnell's Daughter. The Irish Ecclesiastical Record. XXXIII. Dublin: 561–575. p. 571.)
