= Nuala O'Donnell =

Irish noblewoman

- Born: c. 1575; Tyrconnell, Ulster, Ireland
- Died: c. 1630; Leuven, Spanish Netherlands
- Buried: St Anthony's College, Leuven
- Noble family: O'Donnell clan
- Spouse: Niall Garbh O'Donnell (m. 1591; sep. 1600)
- Father: Hugh McManus O'Donnell
- Mother: Iníon Dubh

Nuala O'Donnell (Irish: Nuala Ní Dhomhnaill; c. 1575 – c. 1630) was an Irish noblewoman of the O'Donnell clan. She took part in the Flight of the Earls, and was known as "the Lady of the Piercing Wail".

After the death of her siblings Rory, 1st Earl of Tyrconnell and Cathbarr O'Donnell in 1608, she became the key representative of the O'Donnell clan. During her time in Continental Europe, she petitioned both Philip III of Spain and James I of England to assist the O'Donnells. She died circa 1630, presumably in Leuven, where she is interred.

== Early life ==
Born in sixteenth-century Tyrconnell, Nuala was the daughter of Hugh McManus O'Donnell, Gaelic Lord of Tyrconnell and Chief of the Name of Clan O'Donnell. Historian Jerrold Casway states that Nuala's mother was Hugh McManus's second wife Iníon Dubh, whom he married in 1569. Historian Paul Walsh notes that, from the evidence available, Nuala's maternal heritage is unclear.

Casway estimates Nuala's birth year as c. 1575. Similarly, historian Helena Concannon reasoned that "Nuala was already married to Niall Garbh in 1592. This will place her birth-year with some degree of probability about 1577 — not later." In contrast to Concannon, Andrea Knox believes Nuala was Rory's older sister. Francis Martin O'Donnell gives Nuala a birthdate of 1565. John J. Silke calls Nuala the older sister of Hugh Roe.

Based on Nuala's intellect and her later affiliations with the Franciscans, it is likely they were responsible for her education.

Her father's other children include Donnell, Hugh Roe, Rory, Manus, Mary, Margaret and Cathbarr. She was also a sister-in-law of Hugh O'Neill, Earl of Tyrone due to his marriage with her elder half-sister Siobhán. One source claims that Nuala was Hugh McManus's youngest daughter.

== Clan politics ==
Much of her family became engulfed in the violent O'Donnell succession dispute of the 1580s and 1590s, as various claimants attempted to secure the right to succeed her father as clan chief. In 1590, her elder half-brother Donnell was killed in battle by Scottish redshank mercenaries hired by Iníon Dubh, allowing her brother Hugh Roe to emerge victorious by 1592.

In 1591, Nuala made a dynastic marriage with Niall Garve O'Donnell, her cousin and a rival claimant to the O'Donnell lordship. Niall had failed in his ambitions to succeed Sir Hugh as chief, and this marriage was the family's attempt to temper his hostility and reconcile with Niall.

However Niall, along with three of his brothers and many followers, dramatically switched sides and began assisting Crown forces under the English commander Sir Henry Docwra who were operating out of Derry. He led forces during the Crown victories at the Battle of Lifford and Siege of Donegal, and had troops of the Royal Irish Army placed under his command. Niall's ambition was to depose Hugh Roe and have himself declared the Lord of Tyrconnell.

When Nuala heard of her husband's defection, Nuala left him and returned to live with her brother Hugh Roe, taking some of her children with her. In a furious reaction to Niall's betrayal, Hugh Roe is alleged by Dowcra to have beat Nuala's four-year-old son (and his own nephew) to death against a post. Nuala would have been expected, if this were true, to launch a blood feud against her brother, but she instead divorced Niall in 1600. Following Hugh Roe's death in 1602, she joined the household of his successor Rory, who was made Earl of Tyrconnell.

== Flight of the Earls ==
In 1607, Nuala O'Donnell fled Ireland with several Gaelic nobles, led by Hugh O'Neill and Rory O'Donnell, as refugees into Catholic Europe. It is highly likely that, as a single woman, Nuala made her own decision to join the Flight, believing her prospects would be better in Catholic Europe than in a colonised Ireland. She was the eldest of the noble women who fled, and she took with her one "dama" (lady-in-waiting) and one criada (maidservant).

According to Casway, "she was the only woman born to either of the two ruling northern families and was a decade older than the other noble ladies. It is also conceivable that only Nuala had the opportunity to decide for herself whether to participate in the Flight of the Earls. Had the other women resisted or remained in Ulster, they faced the certain prospect of estrangement, deprivation, and possible captivity—not to mention separation from their children and a loss of status. Though these women became dependent on foreign pensions and the good will of their reluctant hosts, those who stayed behind barely survived on remnants of their former estates."

Nuala and her sister-in-law Rosa (Cathbarr's wife) became responsible for Rory's son Hugh Albert - whose mother had remained behind in Ireland - and Cathbarr's son Hugh. The nobles stopped in Leuven, where both boys were left under the care of the Franciscans. Scholar Eleanor Hull claims Nuala was left behind in Leuven, though Casway believes she continued to Rome.

The exiled nobles were granted asylum by Pope Paul V. However, their small pension and sparsely furnished residences made their living conditions unpleasant. In 1608, both Rory and Cathbarr died in Rome from a fever, leaving Nuala as the key representative of the O'Donnell clan.

== Life in Continental Europe ==
=== Rome ===
The Spanish ambassador petitioned Philip III of Spain to grant Nuala her late brothers' pension. He also pleaded for both women to be allowed to return to Flanders, where they could care for the young O'Donnell heirs. Philip had no issue with Nuala's pension, but he did not want to raise tensions with England by allowing the exiled nobles to travel freely. However, Nuala was not deterred, and she implored the King to reconsider, complaining about Rome's climate.

On 26 August 1610, Philip III gave in and allowed Nuala to go to Flanders. Nuala received 300 crowns for expenses, and her pension was diverted to a secret fund for the Spanish Netherlands’ army. In the words of Philip III, the pension was to be paid "as long as she may live or as long as I may wish".

=== Flanders ===
In October 1610, her two nephews were removed from the Dame Blanches Convent by Irish clergyman Hugh MacCaghwell and sheltered at St Anthony's College, Leuven.

Sometime later, Nuala and Rosa were finally permitted to leave Rome for Flanders, and were supported by the new Catholic Archbishop of Tuam, Florence Conroy. Since her nephew's fathers had unexpectedly died leaving no adult patriarch to the O'Donnell family, the well-being of the boys had become paramount to the Catholics. During their journey Nuala and Rosa were accompanied by Catholic Archbishop of Dublin Eugene Matthews, and in Flanders she was reunited with her two nephews.

According to historian Knox, in moving to Flanders, Nuala went directly against Philip III's wishes. However, she was able to support herself in the form of a pension for carrying and delivering documents between Flanders and Rome.

=== Brussels ===
In March 1614, Nuala secretly traveled to Brussels for a meeting with English diplomat William Trumbull. She offered to withdraw the young Hugh Albert from Flanders, and pledged her loyalty to King James I. Nuala asked for James I's "grace and pardon" and for "the restoring of [Rory O'Donnell's] lands". Trumbull gave no guarantee of the king's favour - due to the past conflicts between the O'Donnells and the English - and suggested Nuala travel to England with Hugh Albert to plead for "bounty and clemency" from the King. Unfortunately for Nuala, she could not be granted safe passage back to the British Isles, and her proposals were in vain.

Her secret pension suffered "ever-threatening cuts", though she managed to prevent it from being depleted. As Hugh Albert matured, he took over leadership of the O'Donnell clan. At one point she called on Florence Conroy to vouch for her.

== Death and legacy ==
Nuala O'Donnell died circa 1630 and was interred in the chapel of St Anthony's College, Leuven, Belgium. She never returned to Ireland.

=== Issue ===
The topic of Nuala's children is unclear. Her daughter with Niall, Grania, had accompanied her into Italian exile. According to the Calendar of State Papers, Nuala and Niall's four-year-old son was killed by Hugh Roe around 1600.

Niall Garve O'Donnell had a son, Naghtan (fl. 1608), who was imprisoned in the Tower of London with his father. He may also be Nuala's son. Historian George Hill mentioned Naghtan having two younger brothers. Conversely, Casway believes Nuala and Niall had no children.

=== In poetry ===
Nuala O'Donnell is referenced in several poems. Her colleague Owen Roe MacWard wrote a poem describing her mourning at the graves of her late brothers. James Clarence Mangan's 19th-century elegy, Lament for the Princes of Tyrone and Tyrconnell (Buried in Rome), references Nuala. It begins:

O Woman of the Piercing Wail,
Who mournest o'er yon mound of clay
With sigh and groan,
Would God thou wert among the Gael!
Thou wouldst not then from day to day
Weep thus alone.
'Twere long before, around a grave
In green Tirconnell, one could find
This loneliness;
Near where Beann-Boirche's banners wave
Such grief as thine could ne'er have pined
Companionless.

== Family tree ==
O'Donnell family tree

Issue of Hugh McManus O'Donnell (Aodh mac Maghnusa Ó Domhnaill; c. 1520 - 7 December 1600), son of Lord of Tyrconnell Manus O'Donnell (Maghnas Ó Domhnaill), and Judith O'Neill (Siobhán Ó Néill).

First marriage: Nuala O'Neill (likely dead by 1566), daughter of Shane O'Neill.

- Joanna O'Donnell (Siobhán Ní Domhnaill)
  - Died January 1591
    - Married Hugh O'Neill, Earl of Tyrone in June 1574 - marriage repudiated in 1579 - later reconfirmed
      - Margaret O'Neill (fl. c. 1596)
        - Married Richard Butler, 3rd Viscount Mountgarret shortly before 8 October 1596
      - Sarah O'Neill (fl. 1595–1602)
        - Married Sir Arthur Roe Magennis before 4 March 1595
      - Mary O'Neill (fl. 1608)
        - Married Brian McHugh Og MacMahon
      - Alice O'Neill (1583 – c. 1665)
        - Married Randal MacDonnell, 1st Earl of Antrim in 1604
      - Hugh O'Neill (c. 1585 – 24 September 1609)
      - Henry O'Neill (c. 1586 – 25 August 1610)
- Daughter (name unknown) (Note: Walsh, Paul (1922). Hugh Roe O'Donnell's Sisters. The Irish Ecclesiastical Record. XIX. Dublin: 358–364. p. 362.)
  - Married a son of Turlough Luineach O'Neill
- Duncan "Scaite" O'Donnell (Donnchadh Ó Domhnaill) (Note: Ó Domhnaill, Niall (1952). Na Glúnta Rosannacha. p. 87. The historicity of this person is disputed.)
- Rory O'Donnell (Ruaidhri Ó Domhnaill)
  - Died 1575
- Donal O'Donnell (Domhnall Ó Domhnaill)
  - Died 14 September 1590
    - Married a daughter of Turlough Lynagh O'Neill, c. 1588
    - Unknown woman
      - Donnell Oge O'Donnell (c. 1585 – 5 September 1620)

Second marriage, 1569: Fiona MacDonald (Fionnghuala Nic Dhomhnaill, also known as Iníon Dubh), daughter of James MacDonald, 6th of Dunnyveg and Agnes Campbell.

- Hugh Roe O'Donnell (Aodh Ruadh Ó Domhnaill)
  - Born c. 30 October 1572
  - Died 9 September 1602
    - Betrothed to Rose O'Neill by 1587; married in December 1592; separated in 1595; reconfirmed in 1597; divorced by 1598
- Rory O'Donnell (Rudhraighe Ó Domhnaill)
  - Born 1575
  - Died 28 July 1608
    - Married Bridget FitzGerald
      - Hugh Albert O'Donnell (c. October 1606 – 1 July 1642)
        - Married Anna-Margaret de Hénin in 1632
      - Mary Stuart O'Donnell (c. 1607 – after 1639)
        - Married Dualtach O'Gallagher after 1629
      - Some sources incorrectly suggest that they had an elder daughter named Elizabeth (see Elizabeth_Plunket#Errors in her genealogy)
- Nuala O'Donnell (Nuala Ní Domhnaill)
  - Born c. 1575
  - Died c. 1630
    - Married Niall Garve O'Donnell in 1591 - separated 1600
      - A son (c. 1596 – 1600)
    - Child of unknown paternity:
      - Grania O'Donnell (fl. 1607 - 1617)
    - Children of Niall Garve, possibly by Nuala:
      - Naghtan O'Donnell (died 1640)
      - Manus O'Donnell (died 5 June 1646)
      - George Hill mentions Naghtan having two younger brothers (see Niall_Garve_O'Donnell#Family)
- Manus O'Donnell (Maghnus Ó Domhnaill)
  - Born c. 1579
  - Died 22 October 1600
- Margaret O'Donnell (Mairghead Ní Domhnaill)
  - fl. 1607 – 1662 (Note: O'Donnell, Eunan (2006). Reflection on the Flight of the Earls. Donegal Annual (58): 31–44. pp. 37–38. Gráinne and Meadhb are known only as sisters of the Earl (i.e. Rory), with no additional information.) (Note: Walsh, Micheline Kerney (1996). An exile of Ireland, Hugh O'Neill, Prince of Ulster. Dublin: Four Courts Press. pp. 62–63)
    - Married Cormac MacBaron O'Neill
      - Brian Crossagh O'Neill (died 1615)
      - Art Oge O'Neill
- Mary O'Donnell (Máire Ní Domhnaill)
  - Died 1662
    - Married Donnell Ballagh O'Cahan in June 1593; separated 1598
      - Rory Oge O'Cahan
      - A daughter
    - Married Teigue O'Rourke in 1599
      - Brian O'Rourke (born 1599)
      - Hugh O'Rourke (born c. 1600)
- Caffar O'Donnell (Cathbarr Ó Domhnaill)
  - Born c. 1583
  - Died 15 September 1608
    - Married Rose O'Doherty
      - Hugh O'Donnell (c. June 1605 – 1625)
    - Relationship with an unmarried woman
      - Conn O'Donnell (fl. 1608–1629)
- Gráinne O'Donnell (Gráinne Ní Domhnaill)
- Meadhb O'Donnell (Meadhb Ní Domhnaill) (Note: Walsh, Paul (1929). The Book of O'Donnell's Daughter. The Irish Ecclesiastical Record. XXXIII. Dublin: 561–575. p. 571.)

== Bibliography ==
- Casway, Jerrold (2003). "Heroines or Victims? The Women of the Flight of the Earls". New Hibernia Review / Iris Éireannach Nua. 7 (1): 56–74. ISSN 1092-3977. JSTOR 20557855.
- Knox, Andrea (1 January 2002). ""Women of the Wild Geese": Irish Women, Exile, and Identity in Spain, 1596–1670". Quidditas. 23 (1).
- McGurk, John (2006). Sir Henry Docwra, 1564-1631: Derry's Second Founder. Four Courts Press.
- Morgan, Hiram (1993). Tyrone's Rebellion. Boydell Press.
- O’Donnell, Francis Martin (2018), The O'Donnells of Tyrconnell – A Hidden Legacy, Washington, D.C.: Academica Press LLC, ISBN 978-1-680534740
- Silke, John J. (2004). "O'Donnell, Hugh [Aodh Ó'Dónaill; known as Red Hugh, Hugh Roe, Aodh Rua], lord of Tyrconnell (1572–1602), chieftain and rebel". Oxford Dictionary of National Biography (online ed.). Oxford University Press. doi:10.1093/ref:odnb/20554. Archived from the original on 4 March 2025. (Subscription, Wikipedia Library access or UK public library membership required.)
- Swords, Liam (2007). The Flight of the Earls: A Popular History. Columba.
- Walsh, Paul (1922). "Hugh Roe O'Donnell's Sisters". The Irish Ecclesiastical Record. XIX. Dublin: 358–364.
- Walsh, Paul (1929). "The Book of O'Donnell's Daughter". The Irish Ecclesiastical Record. XXXIII. Dublin: 561–575.
- Walsh, Paul, ed. (1930). The Will and Family of Hugh O'Neill, Earl of Tyrone [with an Appendix of Genealogies] (PDF). Dublin: Sign of the Three Candles.
- O'Donnell, Francis Martin (2020), Memorialising Emigré Dignity: Soldiers, scholars, friars & friends reposed in the Irish College in Leuven
