= Iníon Dubh =

Scottish aristocrat and queen consort of Tyrconnell

Fiona MacDonald
- Queen consort of Tyrconnell
- Born: Before 1565; Kingdom of Scotland
- Died: c. 1611; Ulster, Ireland
- Spouse: Sir Hugh McManus O'Donnell (m. 1569; died 1600)
- Issue: Hugh Roe O'Donnell; Rory O'Donnell, 1st Earl of Tyrconnell; Nuala O'Donnell; Manus O'Donnell; Mary O'Donnell; Cathbarr O'Donnell
- Father: James MacDonald, 6th of Dunnyveg
- Mother: Agnes Campbell

Lady Fiona MacDonald (Note: Her given name is also anglicised Finola or Finula, and her surname as MacDonnell.) (Note: Women in early modern Scotland did not use their husband's surnames after marriage. It is unclear whether Fiona used her husband's surname.) (Scottish Gaelic: Fionnghuala Nic Dhomhnaill), better known by her nickname Iníon Dubh (in-NEEN DOO; "Black-Haired Daughter"), was a Scottish aristocrat and queen consort of Tyrconnell from 1569 to 1592. The mother of Hugh Roe O'Donnell, she was a significant politician in 16th-century Ulster and effectively led Tyrconnell when her husband, Hugh McManus O'Donnell, became prematurely senile.

Iníon Dubh was born into Clan MacDonald of Dunnyveg and raised at the Stuart court in Scotland. When her father died in 1565, she and her mother moved to Ireland where in 1569 they both married into prominent Ulster clans. Iníon Dubh supplied her new husband Hugh McManus O'Donnell, Lord of Tyrconnell, with mercenaries from Scotland and pushed the O'Donnell clan into opposition with the English administration. Iníon Dubh bore many children, including Hugh Roe, Rory, Nuala and Cathbarr. She regularly utilised mercenaries to subjugate her family's rivals. In 1593, Protestant Archbishop Miler Magrath described her as "a cruel, bloody woman who has committed sundry murders".

She had significant influence over the reigns of both her husband and son. Historian Emmett O'Byrne has called Iníon Dubh "one of the most remarkable Gaelic woman of the sixteenth century".

== Name ==
Her name in Scottish Gaelic is Fionnghuala Nic Dhomhnaill. She is better known by her nickname Iníon Dubh, pronounced in Ulster Irish and Scots Gaelic as in-NEEN DOO. This literally translates to "Dark Daughter", which refers to her dark hair colour. Spellings of her nickname vary. The phonetic spellings Ineen Dubh, Ineen Doo, or Ineen Duv are common. Historically, Irish orthography favoured An Inghean Dubh. Modern historians James O'Neill, Michelle Boyle and Hiram Morgan use the spelling Iníon Dubh.

== Early life ==
Fiona MacDonald was the daughter of James MacDonald, 6th chief of Clan MacDonald of Dunnyveg, and his wife Lady Agnes Campbell. She was raised at the Stuart court in the Kingdom of Scotland, during the time of Mary, Queen of Scots. James died in Ireland on 5 July 1565.

Once Turlough Luineach O'Neill became Lord of Tír Eoghain, he offered an alliance to the MacDonalds. In November 1567, Turlough asked for either Fiona or Agnes' hand in marriage. At the time, marriage into the MacDonald family was particularly coveted due to their military might.

By April 1568, it was decided that Agnes would marry O'Neill, and Fiona would marry Hugh McManus O'Donnell, King of Tyrconnell. Fiona married Hugh McManus in 1569.

== Queen consort ==
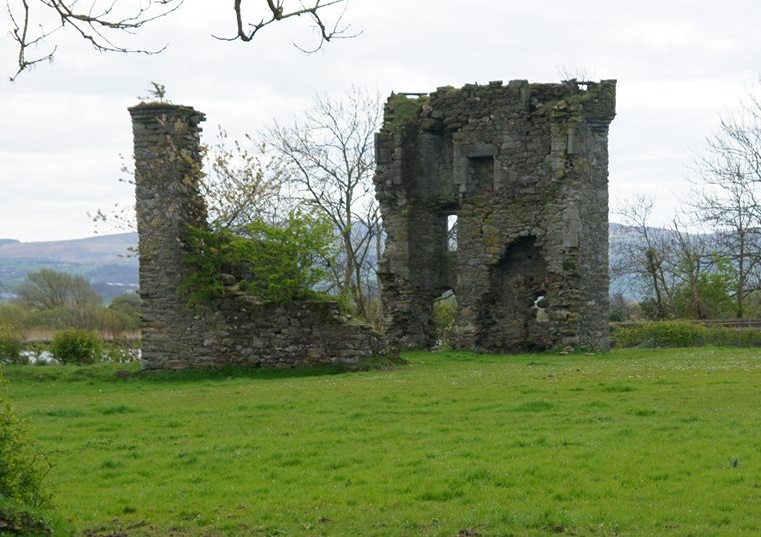
Mongavlin Castle, near St Johnston in the east of County Donegal, was built on the site of Iníon Dubh's chief residence. The current castle, now ruined, was largely built during the early years of the Plantation of Ulster and is located on the western bank of the River Foyle.

Iníon Dubh had a major influence over Hugh McManus's lordship. Her powerful connections ensured a healthy recruitment of Scottish Redshanks from Clan MacDonald to Hugh McManus's armies, and she regularly travelled to Scotland to enlist her kinsmen.

Before their marriage, Hugh McManus had attempted to appease both pro-O'Neill and pro-Crown factions in Tyrconnell by avoiding overt political declarations. This did not satisfy either party. It was ultimately Iníon Dubh's influence that pushed the O'Donnell clan further into opposition with the English. In March 1572, her growing power over her husband was noted by government officials. It is believed that Hugh McManus's decision to maintain his alliance with O'Neill was due to her influence.

She bore four sons, including the last two reigning Kings of Tyrconnell, Hugh Roe and Rory. When her husband grew senile in his old age, she took over the effective leadership of the territory. She is described in the Annals of the Four Masters as "like the mother of Maccabees who joined a man's heart to a woman's thought".

In May 1580, Hugh McManus and O'Neill sent their wives to Scotland to procure more mercenaries. Iníon Dubh and Agnes's efforts were successful – 2,000 Scots arrived in Lough Foyle that August, eliciting much fear in the English.

== Political activity ==
In 1587, her eldest son, tanist Hugh Roe O'Donnell, was kidnapped and imprisoned in Dublin Castle. In his absence, she devoted herself to defending her son's claim to the chieftaincy. Her husband's health worsened in the 1580s, and a violent succession dispute broke out amongst the O'Donnell family over who would succeed him. Increasingly, Iníon Dubh ruled in her husband's name.

Hugh MacEdegany, the son of Hugh McManus's half-brother, was the principal challenger of the succession dispute. He had challenged Hugh McManus's claim since the beginning of the latter's reign in 1566, and had also killed Iníon Dubh's brother Alasdrann in 1586. MacEdegany was assassinated on Iníon Dubh's orders in May 1588. The Annals of the Four Masters describes his death:

"[Hugh MacEdegany] one time happened to be coming up, in pride, vigour, and high spirits (without remembering the spite or the enmity against him) towards the place where she was, at Magh-gaibhlin. When he had come to the town, she addressed her faithful people, i.e. the Scots; and begged and requested of them to fulfil their promise. This was accordingly done for her, for they rushed to the place where Hugh was, and proceeded to shoot at him with darts and bullets, until they left him lifeless; and there were also slain along with him the dearest to him of his faithful people."

In February 1589, when an English garrison arrived to occupy Donegal Castle, they found it engulfed in flames on Iníon Dubh's orders. She had departed for Scotland to secure additional troops.

In 1590, her stepson through Hugh McManus's first marriage, Donal O'Donnell, attempted to depose Hugh McManus and seize power. In response, Iníon Dubh gathered an army of all those still loyal to her husband, including Clan Sweeney, O'Doherty, and many Redshanks from Clan Donald. When their armies came to blows, Donal was defeated and killed by Iníon Dubh at the Battle of Doire Leathan on 14 September 1590.

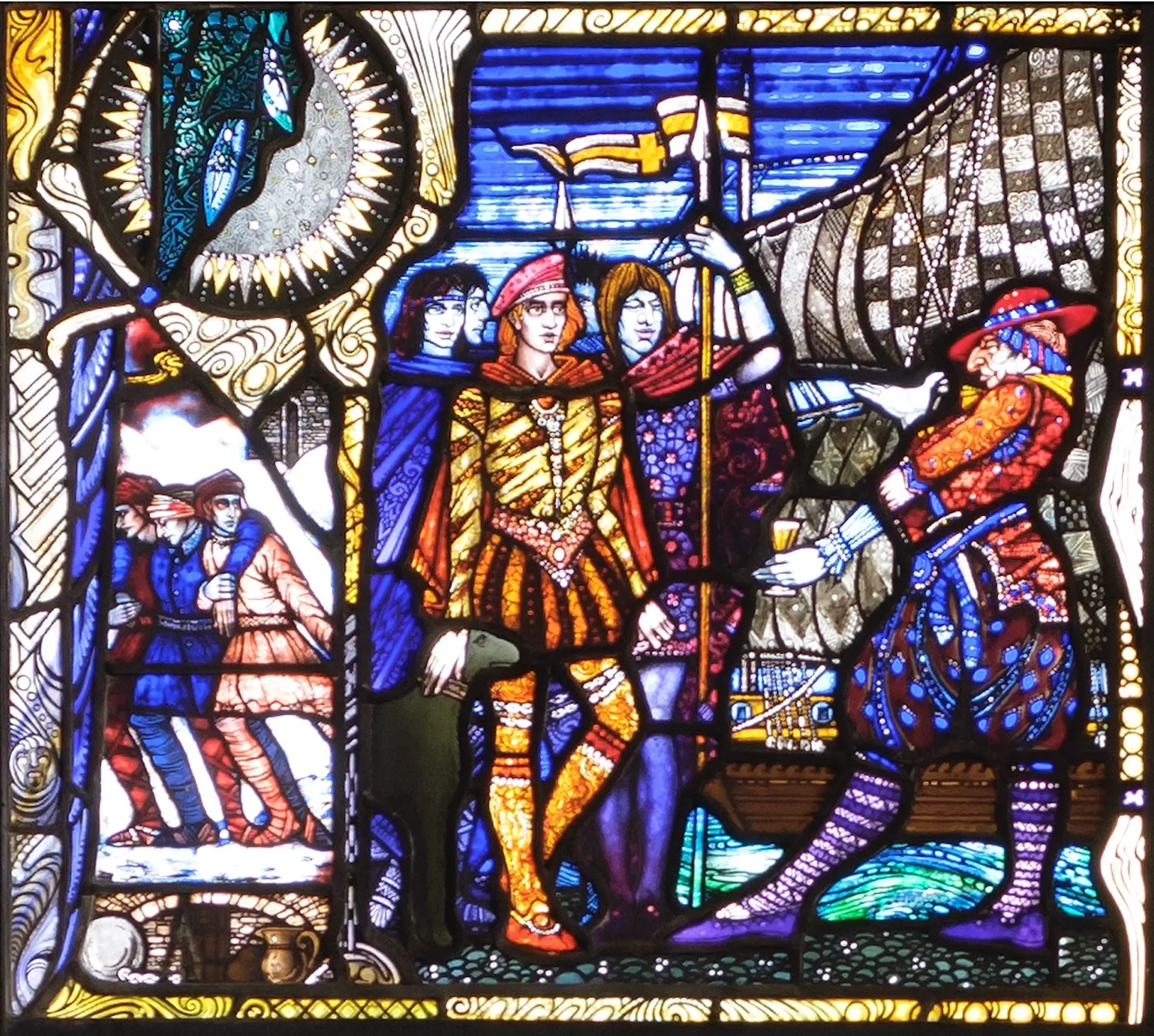
Hugh Roe's succession as King of Tyrconnell was orchestrated by his mother.

Throughout this period she made repeated attempts to secure Hugh Roe's release or escape from Dublin Castle. By spring 1588 she was offering Lord Deputy John Perrot a bribe of £2000 for Hugh Roe's freedom. It seems she may have promoted her son by spreading prophecies – an old prophecy had foretold that if two men named Hugh succeeded each other as O'Donnell chief, the last Hugh shall "be a monarch in Ireland and quite banish thence all foreign nations and conquerors". When Hugh Roe finally escaped and returned to Tyrconnell in 1592, Iníon Dubh temporarily bought off the remaining claimant, Niall Garbh O'Donnell, with a dynastic marriage to her daughter Nuala.

In 1592, before an assembly of fellow nobles in Kilmacrennan, Hugh McManus abdicated in favour of Hugh Roe. His abdication, apparently voluntary, was largely organised by Iníon Dubh.

Many historians have noted the role she played in this change of power. O'Cleirigh commented that her attendance at the assembly was valuable, "for she was the head of the advice and counsel of the Cenel Conaill." Historian Hiram Morgan has alleged that the coronation of Hugh Roe as Chief of the Name at the Rock of Doon near Termon, was "a stage managed affair in which the influence of his mother was paramount". According to Kate Newmann, Iníon Dubh's "military strength and influence is seen as the decisive factor" in Hugh Roe's succession as King of Tyrconnell.

== Nine Years' War ==
During Hugh Roe's reign, Iníon Dubh continued to play a major role as a diplomat. In September 1597, Hugh Roe sent her to stop her brother Angus MacDonald from taking revenge on their ally Hugh O'Neill, Earl of Tyrone, after the Earl had jilted Angus's daughter.

During 1599, she bought arms and once again recruited mercenaries for the Irish alliance. She nursed her husband until his death in 1600.

In the summer of 1601, Iníon Dubh commanded the Irish garrison in Sligo. In June 1601, Hugh Roe appointed her as governor of Sligo Castle. That October, Iníon Dubh and her daughter were captured in Collooney Castle by Sir Henry Docwra. In 1602, Hugh Roe died in Spain and his younger brother Rory submitted. Iníon Dubh was released, and it seems she retired to Mongavlin near Lough Foyle.

== Later life and death ==
In 1608, with all her sons dead, she implicated her estranged loyalist son-in-law, Niall Garbh, in alleged complicity in O'Doherty's rebellion. He was sent to the Tower of London until his death in 1626. In her later years, she also maintained Mongavlin Castle, a small fortress on the banks of the River Foyle, as a residence just south of St Johnston, The Laggan.

Iníon Dubh retired to Kilmacrennan. She probably died shortly after May 1611, when she was last recorded as receiving land in the Plantation of Ulster.

== Children ==
- Hugh Roe O'Donnell (c. 20 October 1572 – 9 September 1572), led the Irish confederacy during the Nine Years' War.
- Rory O'Donnell, 1st Earl of Tyrconnell (1575 – 18 July 1608); fled to continental Europe in the Flight of the Earls. He died of a fever in Rome.
- Manus O'Donnell (c. 1579 – October 1600 (Note: The 17th-century historian Lughaidh Ó Cléirigh states that Manus died on 22 October [O.S. 12 October] 1600, from injuries sustained in the Battle of Lifford. Contemporary English sources state that the Battle of Lifford occurred on [O.S. 24 October], which makes Ó Cléirigh's date incorrect.)); died of injuries sustained in the Battle of Lifford.
- Cathbarr O'Donnell (c. 1583 – 15 September 1608); took part in the Flight of the Earls and similarly died in Rome of fever.

== Ancestry ==
Ancestors of Iníon Dubh (Note: James MacDonald's parents were Alexander Carragh MacDonnell, 5th of Dunnyveg and his wife Catherine. Agnes Campbell's parents were Colin Campbell, 3rd Earl of Argyll, and Lady Jean Gordon. Alexander Carragh MacDonnell's parents were John Cathanach MacDonald, 4th of Dunnyveg and Cecillia Savage. Catherine's parents were John MacIan MacDonnell and Helen Campbell. Colin Campbell's parents were Archibald Campbell, 2nd Earl of Argyll and Elisabeth Stewart. Jean Gordon's parents were Alexander Gordon, 3rd Earl of Huntly and Jean Stewart.)

8. John Cathanach MacDonald, 4th of Dunnyveg
4. Alexander Carragh MacDonnell, 5th of Dunnyveg
9. Cecillia Savage
2. James MacDonald, 6th of Dunnyveg
10. John MacIan MacDonald
5. Catherine MacDonald
11. Helen Campbell
1. Fiona MacDonald
12. Archibald Campbell, 2nd Earl of Argyll
6. Colin Campbell, 3rd Earl of Argyll
13. Elisabeth Stewart
3. Lady Agnes Campbell
14. Alexander Gordon, 3rd Earl of Huntly
7. Jean Gordon
15. Jean Stewart

== In popular culture ==
- In the 1966 Disney film The Fighting Prince of Donegal, Iníon Dubh was portrayed onscreen by Irish actress Marie Kean. She is credited on Disney's website as "The Mother".
- Iníon Dubh is portrayed in the historical novel Dark Queen of Donegal (ISBN 9781950251070) by Mary Pat Ferron Canes and JR Foley.
