= Donnell O'Donnell =

Irish nobleman (died 1590)

Sir Donal Dubh O'Donnell (Irish: Sir Domhnall Ó Domhnaill; died 14 September 1590) was a member of the O'Donnell dynasty of Tyrconnell in modern-day County Donegal. He was the eldest son of Sir Hugh McManus O'Donnell, the Lord of Tyrconnell for much of the reign of Elizabeth I.

== Biography ==
Sir Donal O'Donnell was the eldest son of Sir Hugh O'Donnell, the ruler of Tyrconnell. Sir Donal was the leading contender in the O'Donnell succession dispute of the 1580s which took place while his father was still alive. His personal authority, with duties similar to a Tacksman to a Scottish clan chief, covered "that part of Tirconnell from the mountain westwards, i.e. from Barnesmore to the river Drowes (i.e. Tirhugh), and also all the inhabitants of Boylagh and Tir Boghaine (i.e. Bannagh)". His father's primary domain concentrated on Kilmacrenan and Mongavlin, and his cousin Niall Garbh O'Donnell, with similar duties, held sway over the Clan's traditional stronghold of Lifford and eastwards of there. The Four Masters described him as "a mighty champion and great in battle, and it was never heard that at any time he had turned his back on his enemies" and O'Donovan says he was known "to lead his father's forces".

Amongst the other leading contenders were his younger half-brother Hugh Roe O'Donnell and his great-uncle Hugh Dubh O'Donnell. Donal received the allegiance of O'Boyle and MacSweeney Banagh, as well as of the English Crown, who felt he had a stronger claim to the Lordship, by primogeniture. The Dublin government felt that Donal could command more support locally than his brother as Donal's mother was an Ulster woman while Hugh Roe was the son of Finola MacDonald, daughter of James MacDonald, Scottish clan chief of Clan MacDonald of Dunnyveg and Kintyre. Historian Francis Martin O'Donnell has named Donal's mother as "Nuala, a daughter of O'Neill".

Shortly after the Armada shipwreck of 1588, Sir Donal O'Donnell was knighted and appointed as High Sheriff of Donegal by the Lord Deputy, Sir William FitzWilliam. FitzWilliam also had Sir Eoin O'Gallagher, an influential supporter of Hugh Roe, arrested and imprisoned. In 1589 a force of Irish Army troops were sent into the area under Captain John Connill who assisted Sir Donal against his rivals.

Sir Donal grew stronger in the late 1580s, and took control over much of western Tyrconnell. He was also powerful enough to back his own candidate in the succession dispute in neighbouring Fermanagh, where he established Hugh Maguire as Chief of the Name ahead of his rival Connor Roe Maguire. Donal also drew strength from his alliance with Sir Turlough Luineach O'Neill, whose daughter he had married around 1588.

Shortly after the Armada shipwreck of 1588, Sir Donal O'Donnell was knighted and appointed as Sheriff of County Donegal by the Lord Deputy, Sir William FitzWilliam. Faced with the attempted overthrow of her husband, Sir Hugh O'Donnell, and the eclipse with English backing of her son's claim to the succession, Iníon Dubh hired large numbers of Redshank mercenaries and raised those among Donegal's Irish clans which were still loyal to her husband to confront her son's rival. Sir Donal was defeated and killed in action at the Battle of Doire Leathan, near Glencolmcille, on 14 September 1590.

According to the Annals of the Four Masters, "Seldom before that time had his enemies triumphed over him; and the party by whom he was slain had not been by any means his enemies until they encountered on this occasion; and although this Donnell was not the rightful heir of his father, it would have been no disgrace to Tirconnell to have elected him as its chief, had he been permitted to attain to that dignity. In this conflict were slain along with Donnell the three sons of Owen, son of Mulmurry, son of Donough above mentioned, together with two hundred others, around Donnell."

== Legacy ==
After successfully escaping from Dublin Castle two years later, Hugh Roe successfully had himself made The O'Donnell.

Sir Donal O'Donnell was survived by his only son, Donal Óg O'Donnell. In a Spanish genealogy of the O'Donnell Dukes of Tetuan, Sir Donal O'Donnell features as a collateral ancestor with the annotation "en 1589 su padre le concedio el titulo de marques - en 1587 se adhirio al pacto de su padre para librar a su hermano (Red) Hugh".

== Family tree ==
O'Donnell family tree

Issue of Hugh McManus O'Donnell (Aodh mac Maghnusa Ó Domhnaill; c. 1520 - 7 December 1600), son of Lord of Tyrconnell Manus O'Donnell (Maghnas Ó Domhnaill), and Judith O'Neill (Siobhán Ó Néill).

First marriage: Nuala O'Neill (likely dead by 1566), daughter of Shane O'Neill.

- Joanna O'Donnell (Siobhán Ní Domhnaill)
  - Died January 1591
    - Married Hugh O'Neill, Earl of Tyrone in June 1574 - marriage repudiated in 1579 - later reconfirmed
      - Margaret O'Neill (fl. c. 1596)
        - Married Richard Butler, 3rd Viscount Mountgarret shortly before 8 October 1596
      - Sarah O'Neill (fl. 1595–1602)
        - Married Sir Arthur Roe Magennis before 4 March 1595
      - Mary O'Neill (fl. 1608)
        - Married Brian McHugh Og MacMahon
      - Alice O'Neill (1583 – c. 1665)
        - Married Randal MacDonnell, 1st Earl of Antrim in 1604
      - Hugh O'Neill (c. 1585 – 24 September 1609)
      - Henry O'Neill (c. 1586 – 25 August 1610)
- Daughter (name unknown) (Note: Walsh, Paul (1922). Hugh Roe O'Donnell's Sisters. The Irish Ecclesiastical Record. XIX. Dublin: 358–364. p. 362.)
  - Married a son of Turlough Luineach O'Neill
- Duncan "Scaite" O'Donnell (Donnchadh Ó Domhnaill) (Note: Ó Domhnaill, Niall (1952). Na Glúnta Rosannacha. p. 87. The historicity of this person is disputed.)
- Rory O'Donnell (Ruaidhri Ó Domhnaill)
  - Died 1575
- Donal O'Donnell (Domhnall Ó Domhnaill)
  - Died 14 September 1590
    - Married a daughter of Turlough Lynagh O'Neill, c. 1588
    - Unknown woman
      - Donnell Oge O'Donnell (c. 1585 – 5 September 1620)

Second marriage, 1569: Fiona MacDonald (Fionnghuala Nic Dhomhnaill, also known as Iníon Dubh), daughter of James MacDonald, 6th of Dunnyveg and Agnes Campbell.

- Hugh Roe O'Donnell (Aodh Ruadh Ó Domhnaill)
  - Born c. 30 October 1572
  - Died 9 September 1602
    - Betrothed to Rose O'Neill by 1587; married in December 1592; separated in 1595; reconfirmed in 1597; divorced by 1598
- Rory O'Donnell (Rudhraighe Ó Domhnaill)
  - Born 1575
  - Died 28 July 1608
    - Married Bridget FitzGerald
      - Hugh Albert O'Donnell (c. October 1606 – 1 July 1642)
        - Married Anna-Margaret de Hénin in 1632
      - Mary Stuart O'Donnell (c. 1607 – after 1639)
        - Married Dualtach O'Gallagher after 1629
      - Some sources incorrectly suggest that they had an elder daughter named Elizabeth (see Elizabeth_Plunket#Errors in her genealogy)
- Nuala O'Donnell (Nuala Ní Domhnaill)
  - Born c. 1575
  - Died c. 1630
    - Married Niall Garve O'Donnell in 1591 - separated 1600
      - A son (c. 1596 – 1600)
    - Child of unknown paternity:
      - Grania O'Donnell (fl. 1607 - 1617)
    - Children of Niall Garve, possibly by Nuala:
      - Naghtan O'Donnell (died 1640)
      - Manus O'Donnell (died 5 June 1646)
      - George Hill mentions Naghtan having two younger brothers (see Niall_Garve_O'Donnell#Family)
- Manus O'Donnell (Maghnus Ó Domhnaill)
  - Born c. 1579
  - Died 22 October 1600
- Margaret O'Donnell (Mairghead Ní Domhnaill)
  - fl. 1607 – 1662 (Note: O'Donnell, Eunan (2006). Reflection on the Flight of the Earls. Donegal Annual (58): 31–44. pp. 37–38. Gráinne and Meadhb are known only as sisters of the Earl (i.e. Rory), with no additional information.) (Note: Walsh, Micheline Kerney (1996). An exile of Ireland, Hugh O'Neill, Prince of Ulster. Dublin: Four Courts Press. pp. 62–63)
    - Married Cormac MacBaron O'Neill
      - Brian Crossagh O'Neill (died 1615)
      - Art Oge O'Neill
- Mary O'Donnell (Máire Ní Domhnaill)
  - Died 1662
    - Married Donnell Ballagh O'Cahan in June 1593; separated 1598
      - Rory Oge O'Cahan
      - A daughter
    - Married Teigue O'Rourke in 1599
      - Brian O'Rourke (born 1599)
      - Hugh O'Rourke (born c. 1600)
- Caffar O'Donnell (Cathbarr Ó Domhnaill)
  - Born c. 1583
  - Died 15 September 1608
    - Married Rose O'Doherty
      - Hugh O'Donnell (c. June 1605 – 1625)
    - Relationship with an unmarried woman
      - Conn O'Donnell (fl. 1608–1629)
- Gráinne O'Donnell (Gráinne Ní Domhnaill)
- Meadhb O'Donnell (Meadhb Ní Domhnaill) (Note: Walsh, Paul (1929). The Book of O'Donnell's Daughter. The Irish Ecclesiastical Record. XXXIII. Dublin: 561–575. p. 571.)
