= John Connill =

John Connill (sometimes Connell) was a soldier noted for his service in Ireland during the late sixteenth century.

His background is uncertain. His name may be an anglicisation of the Irish name O'Connell. In 1589 Connill was despatched by the Lord Deputy of Ireland William FitzWilliam with a force of Irish Army troops to the recently established County Donegal. This was part of the Tudor reform programme in Ireland which sought to replace the Irish clan chiefs with English Sheriffs. Connill allegedly secured the position by bribing Fitzwilliam with two gold chains that had been recovered from the wreck of the Spanish Armada in Ireland.

Connill's arrival coincided with a succession dispute amongst the O'Donnell dynasty to establish the next ruler of Tyrconnell, even while the current incumbent Sir Hugh O'Donnell was still alive and the lawful Tanist, Hugh Roe O'Donnell, was imprisoned without trial in Dublin Castle. Connill backed one of the candidates, Sir Donnell O'Donnell, High Sheriff of Donegal, until his defeat and death by forces loyal to his father at the Battle of Doire Leathan in September 1590. Exploiting the chaos following Sir Donnell's death at the battle, Connill took control of much of western Donegal from his base at Donegal Abbey. Along with Humphrey Willis, the Sheriff of Donegal, Connill's men began raiding across Donegal, forcing the inhabitants to give them supplies and money. At one point Connill captured Sir Hugh O'Donnell, but he was freed by a cousin Niall Garve O'Donnell.

In 1592 Hugh Roe O'Donnell returned from his imprisonment in Dublin Castle, and expelled Connill and Willis from Donegal. A criticism of Connill and Willis was that their conduct was similar to the activities of the Irish clan warfare they were officially supposed to be preventing. The behavior of their forces may have been a factor in the subsequent outbreak of Tyrone's Rebellion in 1594.

== Bibliography ==
- Morgan, Hiram. Tyrone's Rebellion. Boydell Press, 1999.
