= Rory O'Donnell, 1st Earl of Tyrconnell =

Irish nobleman (1575–1608)

The Earl of Tyrconnell
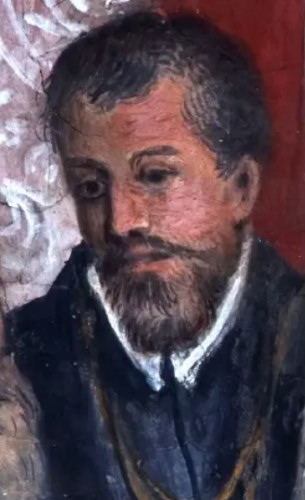
- Extract of a fresco depicting Rory O'Donnell, painted c. 1610 by Giovanni Battista Ricci

1st Earl of Tyrconnell
- Tenure: 29 September 1603 – 18 July 1608
- Predecessor: Title created
- Successor: Hugh O'Donnell, 2nd Earl of Tyrconnell
- Born: 1575; Tyrconnell, Ireland
- Died: 18 July [N.S. 28 July] 1608 (aged about 33); Rome, Papal States
- Buried: 19 July [N.S. 29 July] 1608; San Pietro in Montorio, Rome
- Spouse: Bridget FitzGerald
- Issue: Hugh O'Donnell, 2nd Earl of Tyrconnell; Mary Stuart O'Donnell
- Father: Hugh McManus O'Donnell
- Mother: Iníon Dubh

Rory O'Donnell, 1st Earl of Tyrconnell (Irish: Rudhraighe Ó Domhnaill; (Note: Paul Walsh notes that Rudhraighe is the correct spelling of this nobleman's name, according to traditional Irish orthography.) 1575 – 18 July [N.S. 28 July] 1608), (Note: Unless otherwise stated, all dates before 1752 are given in the Julian calendar.) was an Irish earl and soldier.

A member of the O'Donnell clan of Tyrconnell, he fought alongside his older brother Hugh Roe O'Donnell during the Nine Years' War against the Tudor government. Following Hugh Roe's death, Rory surrendered to royal forces and in September 1603 was created 1st Earl of Tyrconnell. Rory was his brother's tanist but his claim to the chieftainship was disputed by his cousin Niall Garbh O'Donnell. (Note: Rory was Hugh Roe's tanist (designated heir). Per the terms of his surrender, Rory was required to give up his Gaelic titles and thus was never traditionally inaugurated as the O'Donnell clan chief. His cousin Niall Garve had himself inaugurated as clan chief in Kilmacrennan, but his right to rule Tyrconnell was not recognised by English society nor the majority of the Gaelic population. Practically speaking, Rory ruled Tyrconnell up until the Flight of the Earls.)

In 1607, Tyrconnell and his wartime ally Hugh O'Neill, Earl of Tyrone, fled Ireland for mainland Europe in what is known as the Flight of the Earls. Tyrconnell died of a fever shortly after settling in Rome. After his death, his lands were requisitioned as part of the Plantation of Ulster. His son Hugh Albert O'Donnell succeeded him as 2nd Earl of Tyrconnell.

== Early life ==
Born in 1575, Rory O'Donnell was the second son of Irish lord Sir Hugh McManus O'Donnell and his second wife Iníon Dubh. Hugh McManus reigned as Chief of the Name and Lord of Tyrconnell from 1566 until his 1592 abdication in favour of Rory's older brother Hugh Roe O'Donnell. Iníon Dubh was a Scottish aristocrat of Clan MacDonald of Dunnyveg.

Rory's full-siblings included Hugh Roe, Nuala, Manus, Mary, and Caffar. Rory's older half-siblings (children of his father's first wife) included Donal and Siobhán.

In July 1588, Sir Hugh promised Rory to the government as a pledge for good behaviour, though this does not seem to have been accepted.

== Nine Years' War ==
Rory O'Donnell became tanist upon his brother Hugh Roe's 1592 inauguration as Lord of Tyrconnell. Rory fought in the Nine Years' War, though his role is largely overshadowed by Hugh Roe's leadership.

In 1598, Rory was engaged by the governor of Connacht, Sir Conyers Clifford, in a plot against his brother. When this news reached Hugh Roe, he put Rory in chains for an unspecified time. It seems their relationship improved by 1600.

On 9 October 1600, Rory's distant cousin and brother-in-law, loyalist Niall Garve O'Donnell, seized Lifford from him with the help of English forces. Despite attempts from Rory and Hugh Roe to retake Lifford, they were unsuccessful. This culminated in a battle on 24 October, in which Niall fatally wounded Rory's younger brother Manus. Rory and Niall engaged in single combat, though both were lucky to leave the battle with their lives.

That December, Hugh Roe marched to Mayo, leaving Rory temporarily in charge. According to historian Emmett O'Byrne, "his tenure was not distinguished", as during this time, Niall's forces continued to gain momentum.

The Irish confederacy suffered a major defeat at Kinsale. Rory became acting Chief when Hugh Roe left to seek desperately-needed reinforcements from Spain. Rory led the clan back to Connacht and maintained guerilla warfare, with the help of his ally Brian Oge O'Rourke. However, the two men failed in their attempt to take back power in Connacht. They lost Ballyshannon to Niall in Spring 1602, and could not prevent Oliver Lambart from entering Sligo in June. Rory and O'Rourke also argued amongst themselves.

Hugh Roe died in Spain on 30 August [N.S. 9 September] 1602. In December, Rory O'Donnell submitted to Lord Deputy Mountjoy at Athlone.

== Head of the clan O'Donnell ==
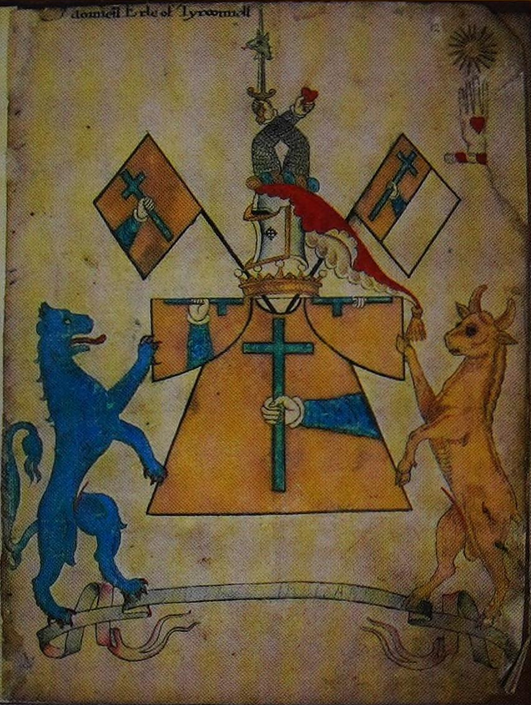
Arms of Rory O'Donnell, 1st Earl of Tyrconnell

Upon his older brother's death, O'Donnell succeeded him as King of Tyrconnell and Chief of the Clan O'Donnell. However, it appears he was never formally inaugurated with the traditional Gaelic rites. Having submitted in London to the newly crowned King James I, Rory, under the policy of surrender and regrant was required to renounce his traditional titles and was in return created as Earl of Tyrconnell per letters patent of 4 September 1603, with the subsidiary title Baron of Donegal reserved for his heir apparent. He was further granted the territorial Lordship of Tyrconnell per letters patent of 10 February 1604. Niall had himself inaugurated with the traditional Gaelic rites at Kilmacrennan.

Rory was created 1st Earl of Tyrconnell on 29 September 1603.

A 1614 Hiberno-Latin history of Donegal Abbey, however, criticized the title of Earl as, "how inferior to that with which the Prince of Tyrconnell used to be acclaimed on the sacred rock of Kilmacrenan!"

== Flight of the Earls ==
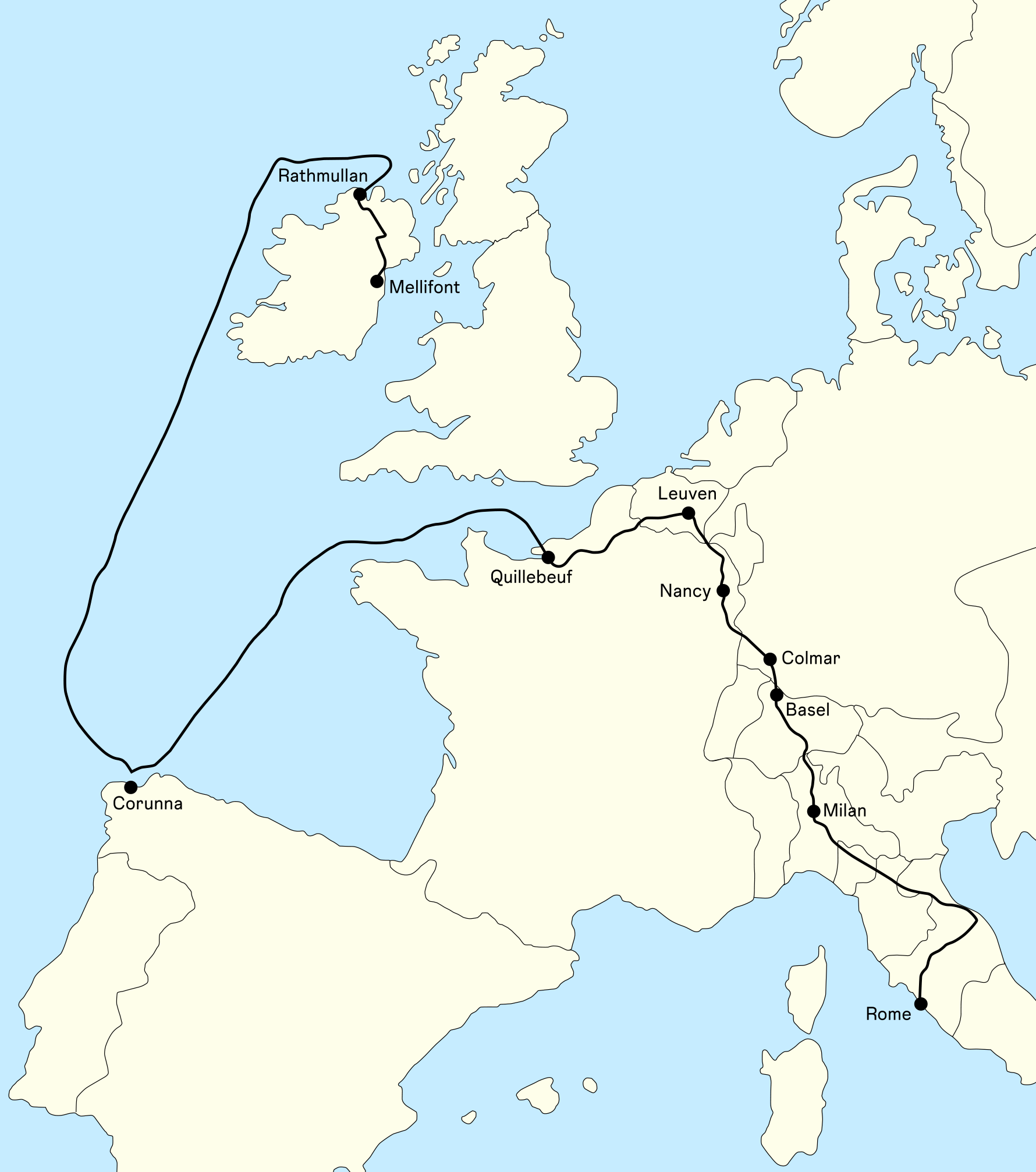
The Earl of Tyrconnell's journey from Rathmullan to Rome

There was much fury in Ireland and England that he and Hugh O'Neill, Earl of Tyrone, had been treated so gingerly after allegedly committing treason (this became known as the Sham Plot), but time was on the side of the English authorities.

In December 1604, Tyrconnell indicated to the Spanish ambassador in London (Juan de Tassis, 1st Count of Villamediana) that if the political situation remained the same for two years, confederates would "embark [and] leave their country" to meet with Philip III. The ambassador gave no encouragement and emphasised that Philip III did not want to provoke conflict with England. It is possible that Tyrconnell was merely bargaining for financial aid, as in February 1606 his secretary stated that the earls preferred to receive aid in the form of a Spanish pension rather than a meeting at the Spanish court.

In 1606, Tyrconnell and Cuchonnacht Maguire made a failed attempt to flee the country in a boat at Killybegs. Shortly afterwards, Tyrconnell and Chichester attended a "tense" supper in Ballyshannon Castle. Tyrconnell complained that the castle and its fishing grounds, which the Crown had taken from the O'Donnell clan, were worth £800 a year; Chichester reportedly told Tyrconnell to "take heed of himself, or else he would make his [head] ache". On a trip to Maynooth in 1607, Tyrconnell spoke of a plot against the English government during a conversation with Richard Nugent, Baron Delvin.

On 14 September 1607, both Earls set sail from Lough Swilly with their families and followers for eventual exile in the Spanish Netherlands and Rome.

The journey was difficult and harsh, and conditions on their boat were extremely poor. The Earls arrived in France, not Spain as expected, then made their way north to the Spanish Netherlands. They eventually arrived in Rome on 29 April 1608. Tyrconnell and Tyrone were welcomed to Rome by a guard of cardinals. The next day, they met with Pope Paul V, who gave them and their families a small pension.

=== Rome ===
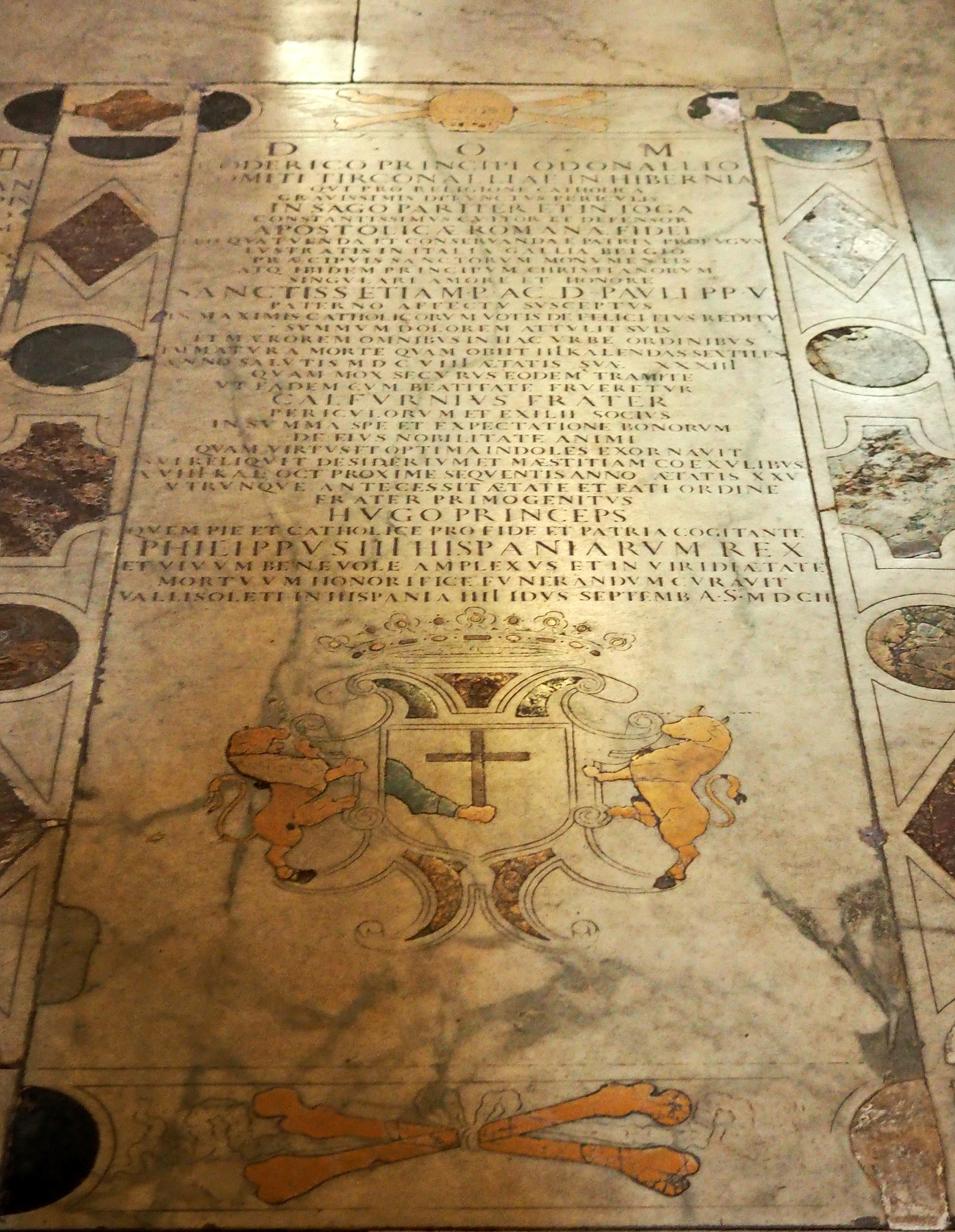
Inscription above the tombs of Rory and his brother Caffar in San Pietro in Montorio, Rome

In early July 1608, Tyrconnell travelled to Ostia, a coastal town fifteen miles west of Rome, in order to "make holiday and take a change of air". He was accompanied by his brother Caffar, Hugh O'Neill, 4th Baron Dungannon, and Donal O’Carroll, Vicar General of Killaloe. Unfortunately, the men "all agreed that that particular place [was] one of the worst and most unhealthy for the climate in all Italy". Tyrconnell became ill on 18 July, and shortly afterwards he died in Rome on 28 July 1608. He was buried the next day in San Pietro in Montorio. His magnificent funeral was funded by the Marqués de Aytona, Spanish ambassador to Rome, who provided Tyrconnell's younger sister Nuala with 300 crowns. His funeral, which took place on the feast of St Martha, was described as "large and splendid... in grand procession... ordered by his Holiness the Pope, and on either side of the body there were large numbers of lighted waxen torches and sweet, sad, sorrowful singing." His funeral "may have passed south from the Borgo district where he had lived, along Via della Lungara on the west bank of the Tiber to San Pietro in Montorio." Tadhg O'Cianan may have taken artistic liberties in describing the funeral.

== Family ==
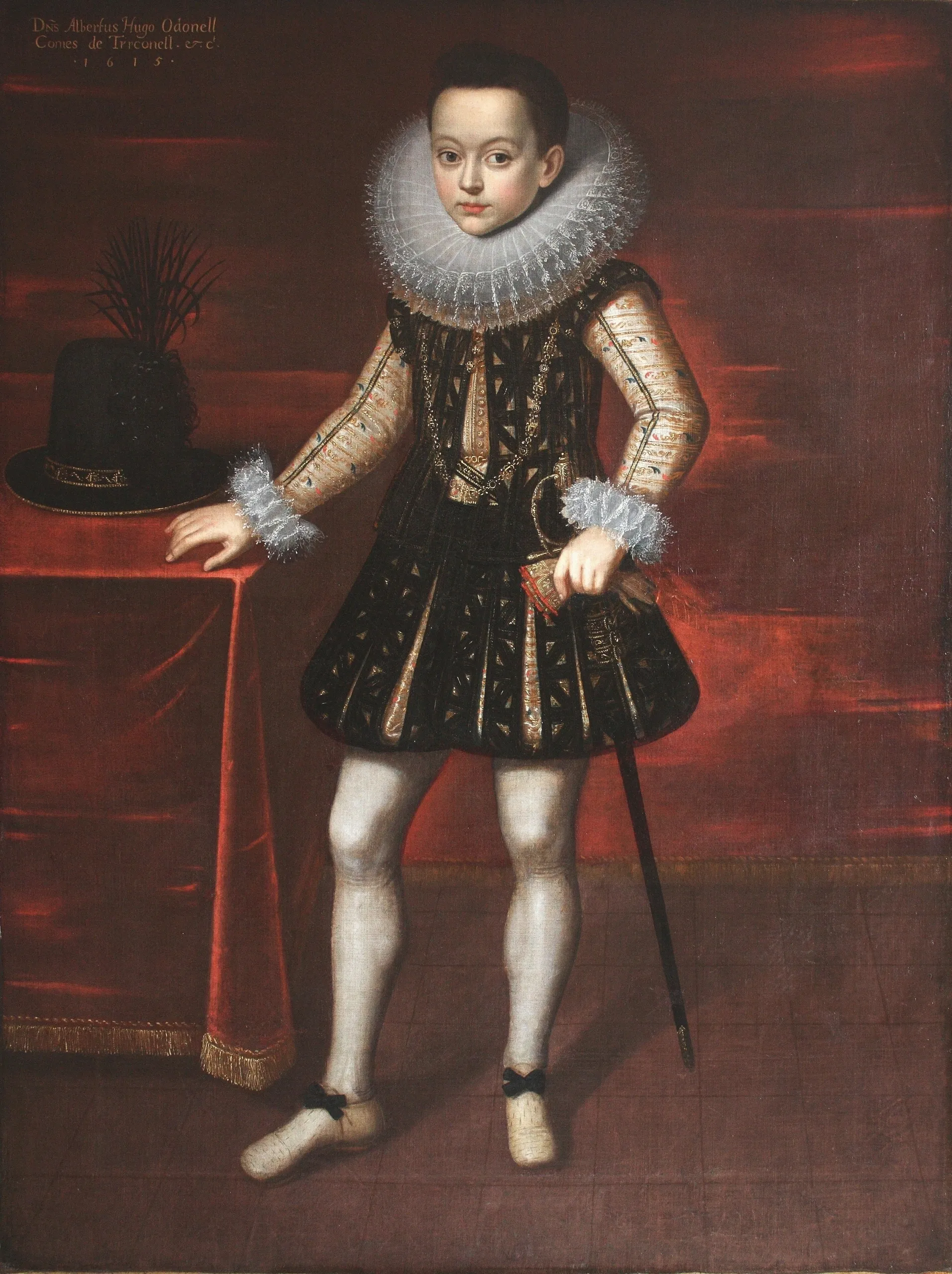
1615 portrait of Tyrconnell's only son Hugh Albert O'Donnell (1606–1642), who succeeded him as 2nd Earl of Tyrconnell

Around 1604, or Christmas 1606, Tyrconnell married Bridget FitzGerald, daughter of the 12th Earl of Kildare, by whom he had two children: Hugh and Mary. Tyrconnell left his wife behind in Ireland during his flight. After his death, Bridget married the 1st Viscount Barnewall (1592–1663), with whom she had five sons and four daughters that survived him.

Lord Tyrconnell's only son, Hugh Albert, was three weeks shy of his first birthday when the Earls sailed from Lough Swilly, and was raised in Louvain, Spanish Flanders. In time he joined the service of the King of Spain, and was killed in action when his ship engaged a French vessel in August or September 1642 and caught fire. He succeeded his father as 2nd Earl of Tyrconnell, but left no offspring; the title of Earl would have descended to his first cousin Domhnall Oge's line were it not attainted in 1614.

Lord Tyrconnell's youngest child, Mary Stuart O'Donnell, was born in England around 1607. After her father's death, King James VI and I, the first Stuart King of England, gave her the name Stuart in recognition of their common Stuart ancestry – they were ninth cousins – hence she was known as Mary Stuart O'Donnell. She was descended, through her mother, from the Stuarts. Mary was raised by her mother in the Kildare lands in Ireland until she was twelve years old. In 1619, Mary was sent to live with her grandmother, Lady Kildare, in London, where Lady Kildare aimed to educate the girl and make her her heiress.

== Portraiture ==
Lord Tyrconnell is depicted as part of a fresco in the Vatican by Giovanni Battista Ricci. Painted circa 1610 in the Sala Paolina, Tyrconnell is depicted standing next to Tyrone during the 1608 canonization of Frances of Rome by Pope Paul V.

Many historians believe that the figure next to Tyrone is actually a Spanish ambassador - either Francisco de Moncada or his father Gastón. The historian Francis Martin O'Donnell argues that the figure lacks Francisco's distinctive facial hair and portly appearance, and looks too young to depict Gastón, who was in his mid-50s at the time. The figure also lacks the ornate clothing an ambassador would be required to wear during such a ceremony. Therefore, it is most likely that the figure standing next to Tyrone is fellow Irish earl Rory O'Donnell.

== Notes ==
Regnal titles
| Preceded by Aodh Ruadh Ó Domhnaill | King of Tir Conaill; 1602–1608 | Vacant |
Peerage of Ireland
| New creation | Earl of Tyrconnell; 1602–1608 | Succeeded by Hugh O'Donnell |
