= Donal O'Donnell (disambiguation) =

Donal O'Donnell is an Irish judge who is the Chief Justice of Ireland since October 2021.

Donal O'Donnell or Donnell O'Donnell may also refer to:

- Donnell Óg O'Donnell, medieval Irish king of Tyrconnell
- Donnell O'Donnell, sixteenth-century member of the O'Donnell clan
- Donal Oge O'Donnell, son of the above
