= Hugh MacEdegany =

Irish nobleman and military leader (1572–1602)

Hugh MacEdegany, (Note: Also spelt MacDeaganach. It means "son of the Dean".) (Irish: Aodh mac an Deaganaigh; before 1567 – May 1588), also known as Hugh MacCalvagh, (Note: Also spelt McCalough and Mac a Callye) and referred to as Hugh O'Gallagher by modern historians, was a sixteenth-century Irishman who was a challenger to the Gaelic kingdom Tyrconnell.

== Life ==
Hugh MacEdegany was an illegitimate son of Calvagh O'Donnell, King of Tyrconnell, (Note: Conversely, Emmett O'Byrne describes MacEdegany as Calvagh's "natural son".) raised as the son of the Dean of Raphoe ("the Deacon O'Gallagher").

Calvagh's half-brother Hugh McManus united with Shane O'Neill to seize the lordship of Tyrconnell. Shane kidnapped Calvagh in 1561, and Hugh McManus was set up as Tyrconnell's ruler. Since the beginning of Hugh McManus's reign, Hugh MacEdegany was a major claimant to Tyrconnell's lordship. At some point, Hugh MacEdegany changed his patronymic to MacCalvagh ("son of Calvagh")—possibly due to fosterage—making him a competitor to the ruling O'Donnell.

Hugh MacEdegany killed Iníon Dubh's brother Alasdrann in 1586. Iníon Dubh married Hugh McManus in 1569. On 10 December 1587, Hugh O'Neill, Earl of Tyrone, informed Queen Elizabeth I that Hugh McManus was likely to be overrun by Hugh MacEdegany, who was calling himself Hugh MacCalvagh. MacEdegany was assassinated on Iníon Dubh's orders in May 1588, during a visit to her residence, Mongavlin Castle.

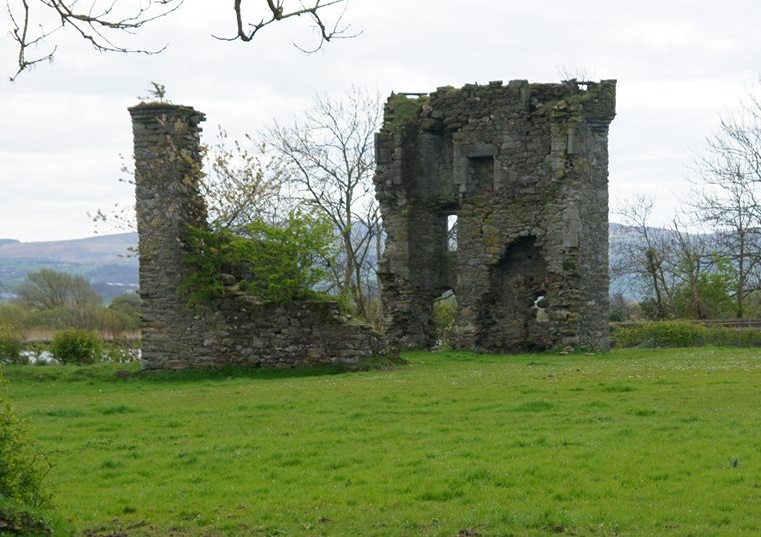
Hugh MacEdegany died at Mongavlin Castle.

The Annals of the Four Masters describes his death:

[Hugh MacEdegany] one time happened to be coming up, in pride, vigour, and high spirits (without remembering the spite or the enmity against him) towards the place where she was, at Magh-gaibhlin. When he had come to the town, she addressed her faithful people, i.e. the Scots; and begged and requested of them to fulfil their promise. This was accordingly done for her, for they rushed to the place where Hugh was, and proceeded to shoot at him with darts and bullets, until they left him lifeless; and there were also slain along with him the dearest to him of his faithful people.
