= Hugh McManus O'Donnell =

Irish Gaelic lord (c. 1520 – 1600)

Lord of Tyrconnell
- Reign: 26 October 1566 – 3 May 1592
- Predecessor: Calvagh O'Donnell
- Successor: Hugh Roe O'Donnell
- Born: c. 1520; Tyrconnell, Ireland
- Died: 7 December 1600 (aged about 80); Donegal, Tyrconnell, Ireland
- Burial: Donegal Abbey, Tyrconnell
- Spouse: Nuala O'Neill (before 1600); Iníon Dubh (m. 1569)
- Issue Detail: Donal O'Donnell; Siobhán O'Donnell; Hugh Roe O'Donnell; Rory O'Donnell, 1st Earl of Tyrconnell; Nuala O'Donnell; Manus O'Donnell; Cathbarr O'Donnell
- House: O'Donnell dynasty
- Father: Manus O'Donnell
- Mother: Siobhan O'Neill

Sir Hugh McManus O'Donnell (Irish: Aodh mac Maghnusa Ó Domhnaill; c. 1520 – 7 December 1600) (Note: Unless otherwise stated, all dates before 1752 are given in the Gregorian calendar, which was used by the Irish confederates and chroniclers throughout O'Donnell's lifetime.) was a Gaelic Irish nobleman. He was clan chief of the O'Donnell clan and Lord of Tyrconnell for most of the Elizabethan era.

In 1561, O'Donnell imprisoned his half-brother Calvagh with the assistance of his family's rival Shane O'Neill. Under brehon law he succeeded as chief upon Calvagh's death in 1566. A "wary politician", O'Donnell's lordship was marked by political indecision. He attempted to appease both pro- and anti-English factions in Tyrconnell, and thus alternated between varying alliances. His clan ultimately united with long-time enemies the O'Neills against the English – this alliance would continue into the Nine Years' War (1593–1603).

O'Donnell's health heavily declined by the 1580s, leading to a major succession crisis which was compounded by the kidnapping of his son and tanist Hugh Roe O'Donnell. His second wife, Scottish noblewoman Iníon Dubh, organised his abdication in 1592, in favour of Red Hugh.

== Early life, 1520–1560 ==
Hugh McManus O'Donnell was born circa 1520. His parents were Manus O'Donnell, Lord of Tyrconnell, and Siobhan O'Neill (Irish: Siobhán Ó Néill), daughter of Conn O'Neill. Some sources have referred to Hugh McManus as Hugh Dubh (Note: Attributed to multiple sources) or Hugh Dubh McManus.

During 1542, O'Donnell was recorded campaigning for his father against the lords of north Connacht.

As identified by an old poem, O'Donnell's first wife was Nuala O’Neill, a daughter of Shane O'Neill. Their children include Donal and Siobhán O'Donnell. This first wife probably died by 1566.

According to historian Robert Dunlop, "for a long time past there had existed two parties in Tyrconnell" – those who supported an alliance with the English, and those who preferred to side with the O'Neills. The O'Neill clan were hereditary rivals to the O'Donnells.

Around 1557, Hugh O'Donnell feuded with his half-brother Calvagh for control of Tyrconnell's lordship. He allied himself with the O’Neill family against Calvagh.

== Reign, 1561–1592 ==
=== Initial rule ===
In May 1561, Shane O'Neill captured Calvagh and imprisoned him in Tír Eóghain, the O'Neills' kingdom. Hugh O'Donnell was set up as the effective ruler of Tyrconnell.

O'Donnell was initially a proactive ruler. In 1561 he defeated Cathal O'Connor at Sligo. With the assistance of the English, Calvagh was reinstated in September 1565. O'Donnell fled to his ally Shane O'Neill and the two returned with reinforcements.

=== Succession ===
Under brehon law, O'Donnell succeeded to the lordship upon Calvagh's death in October 1566. O'Donnell raided Tír Eóghain. O'Neill invaded Tyrconnell in response, but O'Donnell managed to pin O'Neill's forces against the high tide of Lough Swilly and thus drowned them.

The same year, O'Donnell's claim to the lordship was disputed by Calvagh's son Hugh MacEdegany.

=== Politics ===
O'Donnell's succession to the lordship of Tyrconnell was a triumph for the pro-O'Neill faction. However, O'Donnell attempted to appease both factions by avoiding overt political declarations. This greatly diminished the confidence his own party had in him as leader, and his indecision also failed to satisfy the English government. According to historian Emmett O'Byrne, O'Donnell was "always too weak politically and militarily to deal with the combined challenges of the power of the O'Neills in Ulster, the extension of English control into north Connacht, and the strength of his rivals in Tyrconnell".

O'Donnell later did an about-face and allied with the English to crush the O’Neills. In 1567, he defeated clan chief Shane O’Neill at Letterkenny. Shane lost 1,300 men, and was compelled to seek refuge with the MacDonnells of Antrim, who assassinated him. O'Donnell was knighted by Lord Deputy Sidney.

=== Marriage alliances ===
O'Donnell's second wife was Scottish aristocrat Iníon Dubh of Clan MacDonald of Dunnyveg - they married in 1569. At the time, marriage into the MacDonald family was particularly coveted due to their military might. It was ultimately the influence of Iníon Dubh that pushed the O'Donnell clan further into opposition with the English – though publicly Sir O'Donnell maintained his loyalty to the Crown.

In June 1574, powerful O'Neill clansman Hugh O'Neill, Earl of Tyrone, married O'Donnell's daughter Siobhán. In 1587, O'Donnell's son (and tanist) Hugh Roe O'Donnell was betrothed to Tyrone's daughter Rose O'Neill. These dynastic marriages would further cement a growing alliance between two Irish clans who had traditionally been mortal enemies for centuries. The Description of Ireland (1598) makes reference to this alliance: "This controversie was taken away by a double marriage, Tyrone having married [Hugh Roe]'s sister, by whom he hath diverse sons, and [Hugh Roe] having married his daughter..."

=== Spanish Armada ===
In late 1588, 23 ships of the Spanish Armada were lost on Ireland's coast. Lord Deputy William FitzWilliam ordered the execution of Spanish survivors. The Armada ship La Trinidad Valencera sank in Kinnagoe Bay, Inishowen. Upon hearing of the presence of Spanish fugitives there, Tyrone's mercenary forces, commanded by his foster-brothers Richard and Henry Hovenden, proceeded to Inishowen. Tyrone's instructions to the Hovendens are unknown; ultimately his forces committed the largest single massacre of Armada survivors in Inishowen.

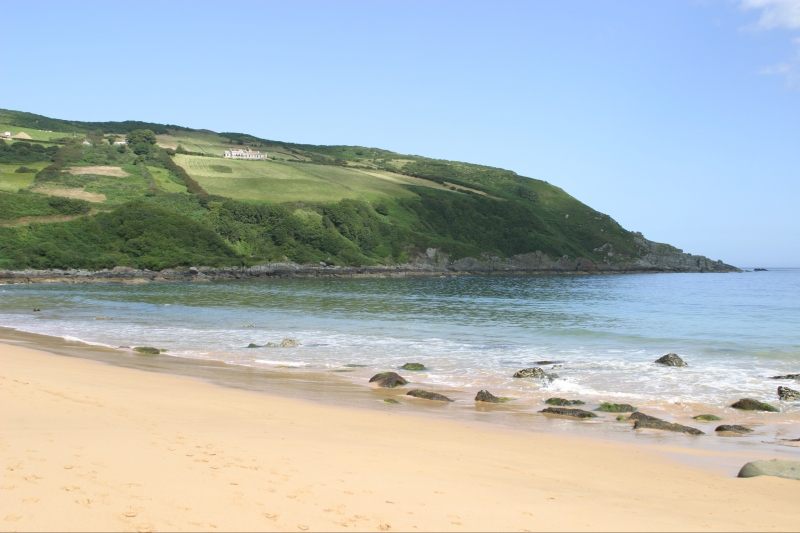
Kinnagoe Bay, Inishowen

Historians Marshall and Morgan characterise Tyrone as reluctantly ordering the massacre to keep in the English government's good graces. However, contemporary sources seem to imply that the massacre was carried out on the actions of the O'Donnell clan – O'Neill's forces were counselled by O’Donnell and Iníon Dubh. In a report from Inishowen prior to the massacre, the Hovendens wrote to FitzWilliam: "O'Donnell is willing to serve against [the Spaniards], and hath none of his country as yet come in to him passing thirty horsemen; he hath sent for all his forces, but it is doubtful whether they will come in to him or not". Government officials reported that Tyrone heavily reprimanded O'Donnell for betraying the Spaniards and their refuge; he contemptuously told O'Donnell to seek dwelling in another country. A 1614 history of Donegal Abbey references O'Donnell doing penance for his sins in his retirement, "the weightiest of which was a cruel raid on the wrecked Spaniards of the Armada, whom he slew in Innishowen, at the bidding of deputy Fitzwilliam".

=== Succession dispute ===
In the 1580s, a violent succession dispute broke out amongst the O'Donnell family over who would succeed him. With the help of her Scottish kinsmen, Iníon Dubh had MacEdegany killed in May 1588, and Donal O'Donnell killed in September 1590. When Sir Hugh O'Donnell became senile in his old age, Iníon Dubh effectively took over leadership of the territory. The succession dispute was compounded by Hugh Roe's kidnapping from Tyrconnell in 1587. O'Donnell offered thirty Spanish officers, taken from the Inishowen shipwreck, as prisoners in the hope to exchange them for his son, but this was unsuccessful. Hugh Roe eventually returned in 1592; Tyrone had bribed officials in Dublin to secure his release.

=== Abdication ===
In 1592, before an assembly of fellow nobles in Kilmacrennan, Sir Hugh O'Donnell abdicated in favour of Hugh Roe. This was accepted by the nobility. Though apparently voluntary, his abdication was largely organised by Iníon Dubh. Hugh Roe was inaugurated as The O'Donnell on 3 May [O.S. 23 April] 1592.

== Later life and death, 1592–1600 ==
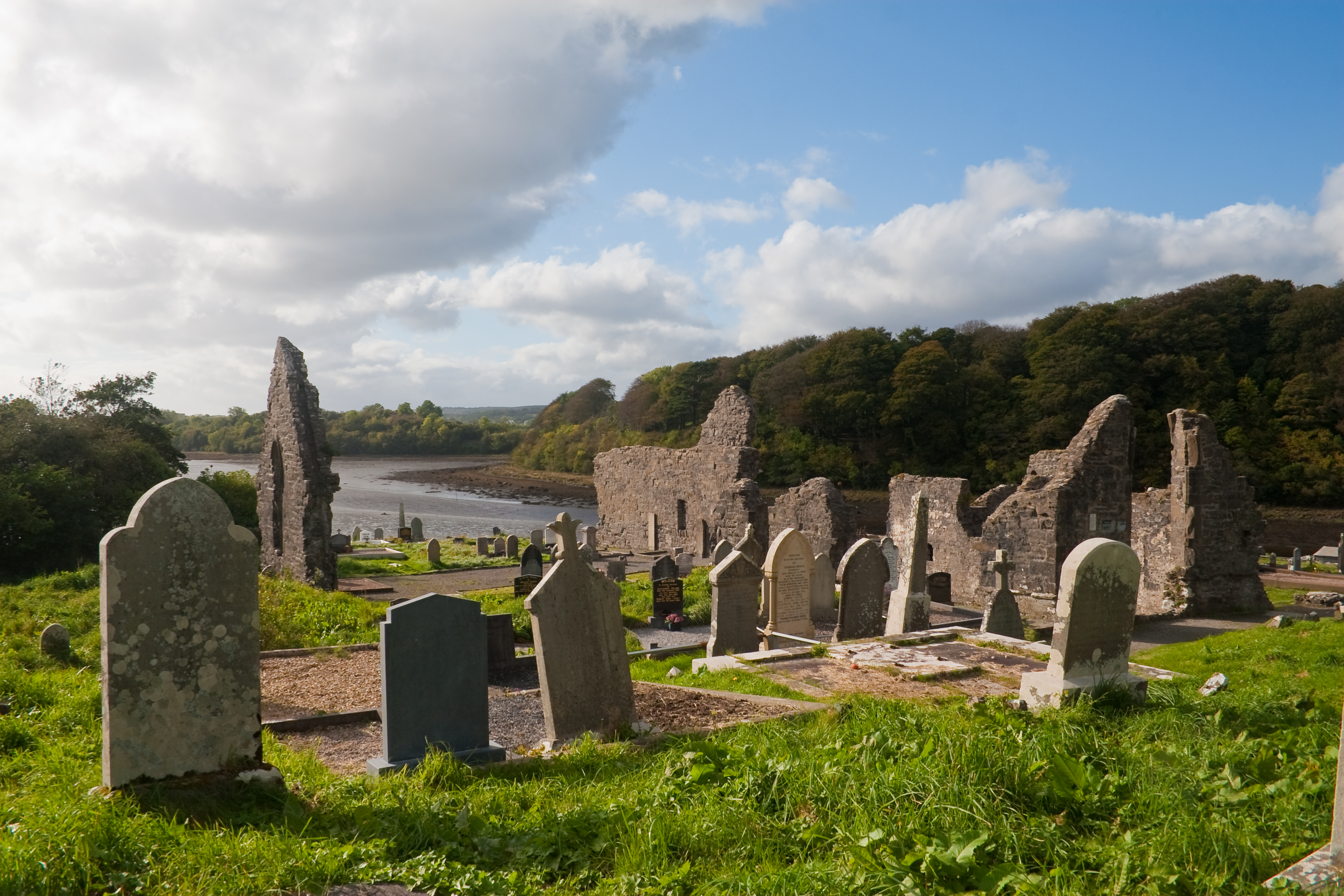
Donegal Abbey, O'Donnell's burial place

According to Philip O'Sullivan Beare, "[O'Donnell], after the manner of Irish Chiefs, devoted the seven years which he lived after this, to prayer and meditation on holy things". He spent his final years living in retirement among the Franciscans at Donegal Abbey and doing penance for his sins.

During the Nine Years' War (1593–1603), Hugh Roe and Tyrone led an Irish confederacy against the government, in opposition to the Tudor conquest of Ireland. In October 1600, Niall Garve, a grandson of Calvagh, defected from the confederacy and began working with the royal army. During the Battle of Lifford, Niall fatally wounded Hugh McManus's son Manus. Manus was taken back to Donegal, where he died of his wounds. In his grief, Hugh McManus died from old age on 7 December 1600. His remains were clothed in the habit of a Franciscan monk and then buried underneath the Chapel of Donegal Abbey.

== Wives and children ==
=== Nuala O'Neill ===
- Siobhán O'Donnell (died January 1591)
- A daughter, who married a son of Turlough Luineach O'Neill
- Donal O'Donnell (died 14 September 1590)

=== Inion Dubh ===
- Hugh Roe O'Donnell (c. 30 October 1572 – 9 September 1572); married Rose O'Neill in 1592 and divorced by 1598. He was his father's successor and led the Irish confederacy during the Nine Years' War.
- Rory O'Donnell, 1st Earl of Tyrconnell (1575 – 28 July 1608); married Bridget FitzGerald. He fled to continental Europe in the Flight of the Earls. He died of a fever in Rome.
- Manus O'Donnell (c. 1579 – October 1600 (Note: The 17th-century historian Lughaidh Ó Cléirigh states that Manus died on 22 October [O.S. 12 October] 1600, from injuries sustained in the Battle of Lifford. Contemporary English sources state that the Battle of Lifford occurred on [O.S. 24 October], which makes Ó Cléirigh's date incorrect.)); died of injuries sustained in the Battle of Lifford.
- Caffar O'Donnell (c. 1583 – 15 September 1608); married Rosa O'Doherty. He took part in the Flight of the Earls and similarly died in Rome of fever.

=== Unclear maternal parentage ===
- Nuala O'Donnell (c. 1575 – c. 1630); married Niall Garbh O'Donnell, but separated from him after his defection in 1600. She took part in the Flight of the Earls.
- Mary O'Donnell (died 1662); married Donnell Ballagh O'Cahan in 1593. They separated around 1598 and she remarried to Teigue O'Rourke.
- Margaret O'Donnell (died 1622–1662); married Cormac MacBaron O'Neill. She emigrated to continental Europe after the Flight of the Earls, arriving in Flanders in 1622. She predeceased her sister Mary.
