= Mongavlin Castle =

Ruined castle in County Donegal, Ireland

- Near Lifford, County Donegal in Ireland
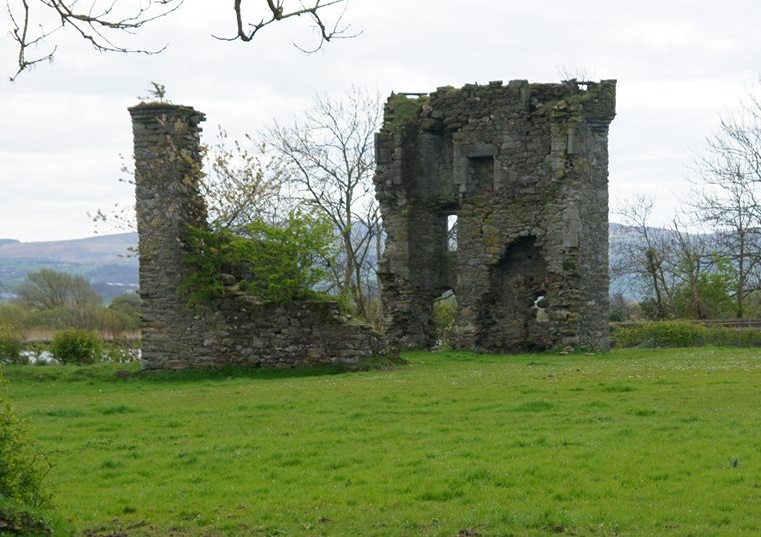
- Mongavlin Castle in June 2013

Site information
- Condition: Ruin

Location
- Coordinates: 54°54′15″N 07°27′12″W
- Designations: RMP DG063-009

Mongavlin Castle, also known as Mongevlin Castle, is a ruined castle on the west bank of the River Foyle, approx 3 km south of St Johnston, a village in the east of County Donegal in Ulster, the northern province in Ireland. Mongavlin was once a stronghold of the O'Donnells, Lords of Tyrconnell.

== History ==
In the sixteenth century, Mongevlin was the chief residence of Iníon Dubh, who was the daughter of James MacDonald, 6th of Dunnyveg, and mother of Red Hugh O'Donnell. The State Paper recording her possession of the castle says: "From Cul-Mac-Tryan runs a bogg three myles in length to the side of Lough Foyle in the midst of the bog is a standing loughe called Bunaber here at Bunaber dwells O'Donnell's mother (Ineen Dubh M'Donnell). Three miles above Cargan stands a fort called McGevyvelin (Mongivlin) upon the river of Lough Foyle O'Donnell's mother's chief house." When Ineen Dubh came to Ulster to marry Sir Aodh mac Maghnusa Ó Domhnaill (anglicised as Sir Hugh McManus O'Donnell), she brought a force of 100 of the biggest men she could find in Scotland. These soldiers were her bodyguards, 80 of these were of the name Crawford. When the O’Donnells eventually abandoned Mongavlin, the Crawfords settled and married in the locality. Many of their descendants can still be found in the area to this day.

In April 1608, following the Flight of the Earls (14 September 1607), Sir Cahir O’Doherty, the last Gaelic Lord of Inishowen and the rebel leader, laid siege to the City of Derry. He had been angered that his lands had been confiscated for the Plantation of Ulster. While Sir Cahir was trying to capture Derry, he sent Niall Garve O'Donnell to Lifford Castle to repel any attempt by the English Crown to send reinforcements to Derry by the river crossing at Lifford. Niall Garve, being greedy, wanted to be close to the action and have a chance of getting a good share of the spoils when Derry would be sacked. He instead of going to Lifford went to Mongavlin Castle and evicted Ineen Dubh. Here he began plundering the local area and on hearing the news of Niall Garve's actions, Sir Cahir in turn evicted Niall Garve and reinstated Ineen Dubh in Mongavlin. Sir Cahir eventually sacked and burned Derry, killing the Governor, Sir George Paulet, in the process. Shortly after this the castle was abandoned due to the in-fighting of the O’Donnell clan.

The present ruin was built for Sir John Stewart of Methven, an illegitimate son of the 2nd Duke of Lennox, a senior-ranking Scottish nobleman, who was also governor of Dumbarton Castle until he was convicted of cruelty and adultery. Mongavlin Castle was recorded by Captain Nicholas Pynnar in his Survey of the Escheated Counties of Ulster in 1619, where he wrote that Sir John Stewart had built a very strong castle at ‘Magerlin’ with a flanker at each corner. There had been a flag stone over the archway with the inscription 'J.S.-E.S.T.-1619' which went missing in the early eighteenth century. Though the account that the castle had been completed in 1619 is contradicted by a later Survey (in 1622) of the Escheated Counties of Ulster that reads; Sir John Stuart, assignee of the Duke of Lennox ‘has built a castle of lime and stone on the banks of the River Foyle 50’ x 25’ x 3 1/2 stories, slated, with 4 flankers at the top thereof. And an iron door portcullis wise; the principal timber and joists of the floor being oak are laid but not boarded or the partitions made, the iron grates for the windows being within the castle ready to be set up’.

The 2nd Duke of Lennox was granted Mongevlin Castle and lands of 1,000 acres by royal patent on 23 July 1610. On the death of Ludovic on 16 February 1624, the title of Duke of Lennox and the castle and lands at Mongavlin passed to his brother Esme, who now became the 3rd Duke of Lennox. Esmé married Katherine, 2nd Baroness Clifton, in 1609, and they had eleven children. After the death of Esmé in August 1624, Katherine then married the 2nd Earl of Abercorn circa 1632. Later, the 6th Earl of Abercorn erected a plaque in memory of his mother, The Hon. Elizabeth Hamilton, in 1704.

King James II and VII visited here on his way to the Siege of Derry in 1690. From here he sent a letter proposing surrender; it was rejected.

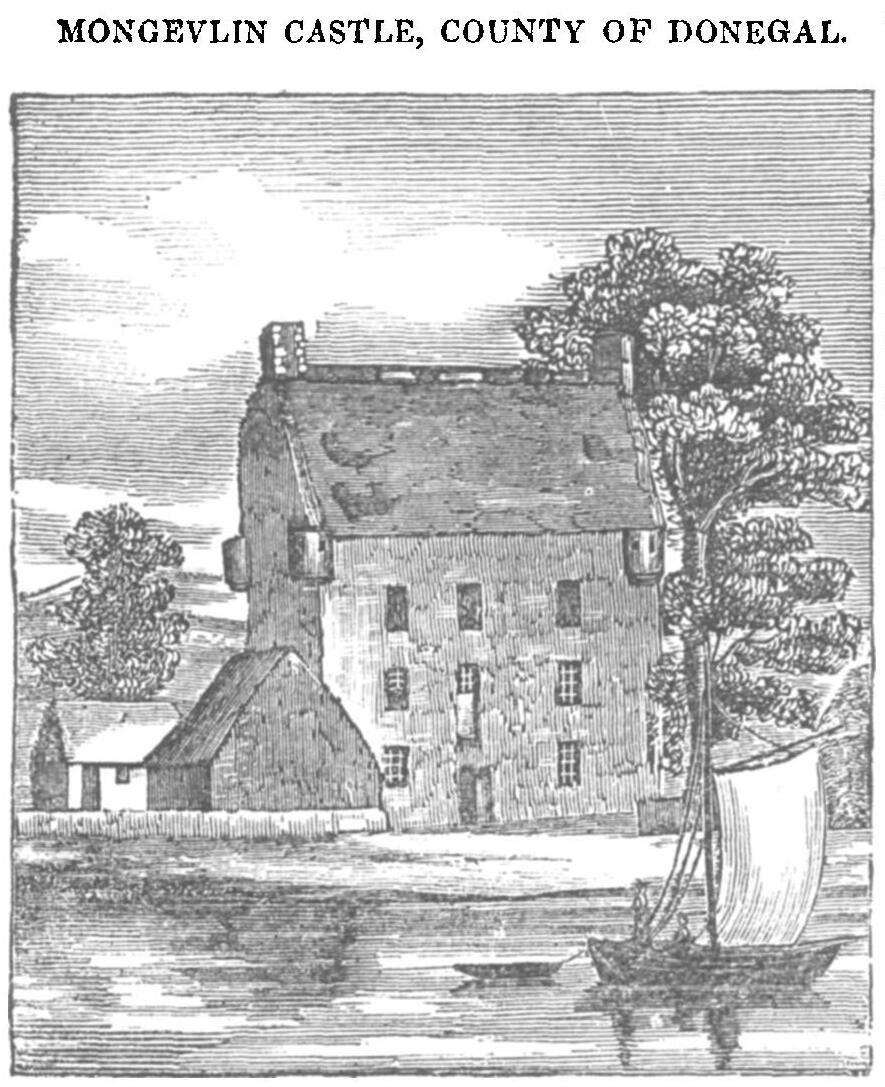
Mongevlin Castle, County of Donegal, Dublin Penny Journal, 1836.

The castle is now in ruins with only a small portion of it left standing.
