= Turlough Luineach O'Neill =

Irish Lord

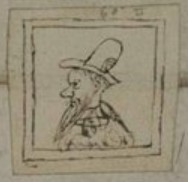
- 1574 sketch of O'Neill by Barnabe Googe, said to greatly resemble him

Lord of Tír Eoghain
- Reign: 1567 – September 1595
- Predecessor: Shane O'Neill
- Successor: Hugh O'Neill
- Born: c. 1530 near Newtownstewart, Ulster, Ireland
- Died: 9 – 12 September 1595; Strabane, Ulster, Ireland

Sir Turlough Luineach O'Neill, Earl of Clanconnell (Irish: Toirdhealbhach Luineach Ó Néill; c. 1530 – September 1595) was an Irish lord. He ruled the Gaelic kingdom of Tír Eoghain from 1567 to 1595.

He was inaugurated upon Shane O’Neill’s death, becoming The O'Neill. From 1567 to 1595, Sir Turlough Luineach O'Neill was leader of the O'Neill clan, the most powerful family in Ulster, the northern province in Ireland. He was knighted in 1578.

== Family and early life ==
Turlough was born around 1530 at Seanchaisleán ('Old Castle'), close to the modern town of Newtownstewart. He was the fourth son of Niall Connallagh O'Neill, Tanist of Tyrone (1519–1544), and was fostered by the O'Lunaigh family of Munterluney. As Tanist, Niall Connallagh was designated to succeed his great-uncle Conn Bacach (1519–1559) as The O'Neill. Turlough's mother may have been Niall Connellagh's wife, Rose O'Donnell, the daughter of Manus O'Donnell, The O'Donnell of the neighbouring kingdom of Tyrconnell. Turlough was the grandson of Art Og McConn, The O'Neill (1513–1519), and was a direct descendant of Brian McNiall Roe, The O'Neill and ruler of Tír Eoghain (1238–1260).

== Tanist ==
Turlough was tanist (designated heir) of his uncle Shane O'Neill. Shane and Baron Dungannon contested for the title Earl of Tyrone. In 1562, both were ordered to attend the Court in London to present their cases to Queen Elizabeth I. Shane came to London, but while Lord Dungannon was travelling from Newry to Carlingford he was killed by Turlough, almost certainly on the orders of Shane.

== Turlough as O'Neill ==
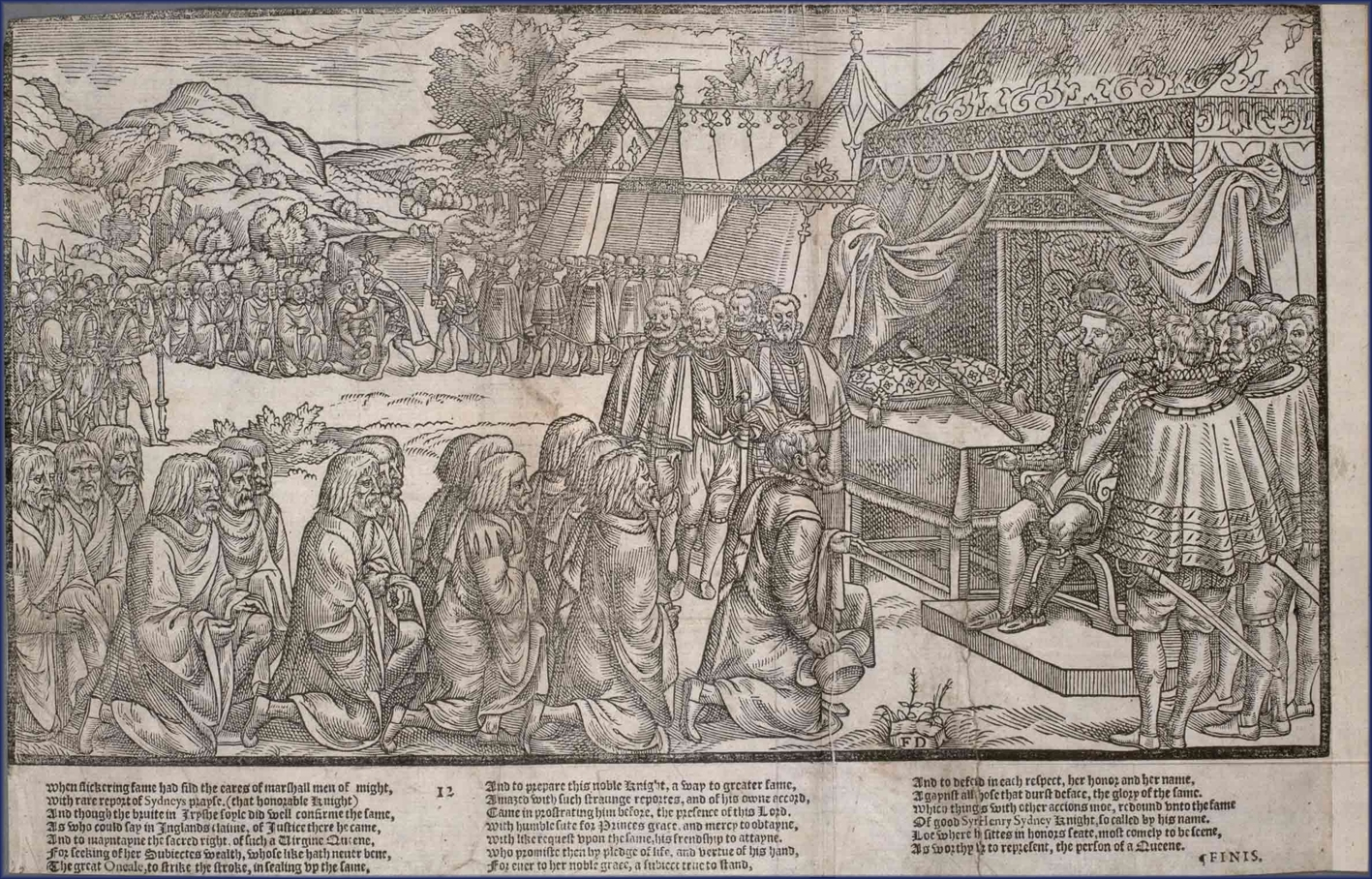
Plate 12 from "The Image of Ireland". Turlough Lynagh O'Neale and the other kerne kneel to Sir Henry Sidney in submission. In the background Sidney seems to be embracing O'Neale as a noble friend.

Making professions of loyalty to the Queen of England in the year following Shane's assassination, Turlough sought to strengthen his position by alliance with the O’Donnells, MacDonnells and MacQuillans. In 1570 he killed Turlough MacSweeny in battle at Dún na Long on the Foyle. His conduct giving rise to suspicions, an expedition under The 1st Earl of Essex was sent against him, which met with such doubtful success that in 1575 a treaty was arranged by which O’Neill received extensive grants of lands and permission to employ three hundred Scottish mercenaries. A further treaty in 1578, negotiated by Lady Agnes, confirmed Turlough's vast land holdings in Ulster, granted him a knighthood and the British titles of Earl of Clanconnell and Baron of Clogher, for life, and allowed him to retain for life the personal army of Scottish mercenaries negotiated three years before.

Still, at the outbreak of rebellion in Munster his attitude again became menacing, and for the next few years he continued to intrigue against the English authorities through clandestine alliances with Spain and Scotland, yet he maintained virtual control of Ulster until 1593, when he was forced by poor health and military setbacks to concede power to his principal rival, Hugh, brother of Brian, whom Sir Turlough had assassinated in 1562 during Shane O’Neill's absence at the court of Queen Elizabeth I of England. Hugh was recognised by Sir Turlough Luineach as captain of Tyrone, and as his Tanist, in 1593. During the summer of 1595, Hugh seized the last castle still held by Sir Turlough Luineach, razed it, and drove him into the wilderness. He died in Strabane between 9 and 12 September 1595, and was buried at Ardstraw, probably at the Franciscan friary founded by his ancestors.

Sir Turlough Luineach had successfully survived as "The O'Neill" from 1567 until 1595, a turbulent quarter century that saw the most concerted efforts by the English administration to weaken and marginalise his authority in Ulster. He is frequently depicted by contemporary English historians as a weak, drunken buffoon, but his continued survival as The O'Neill through this period speaks of his considerable skill as a ruler and of a sustained policy of successful compromise.

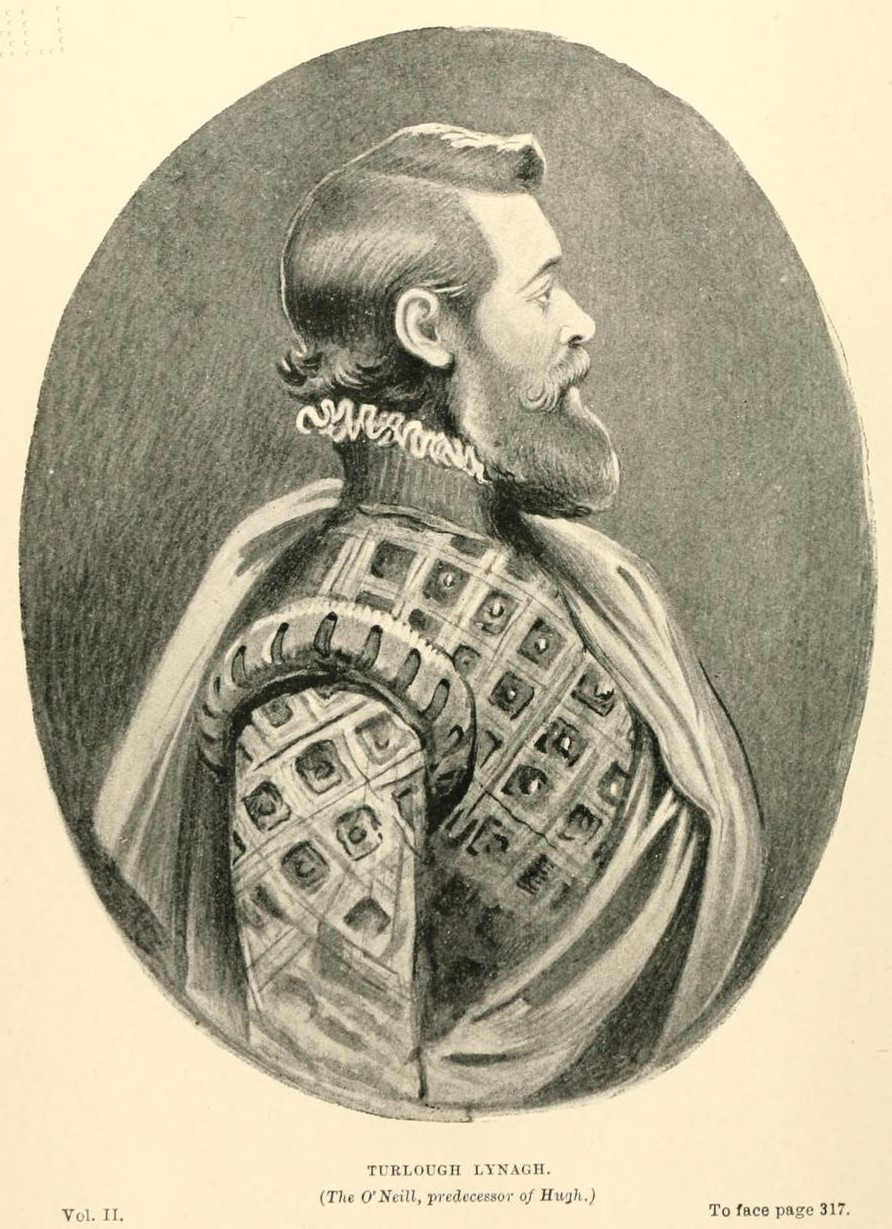
Drawing in Pacata Hibernia (1896)

== Patron of the Arts ==
Sir Turlough Luineach has the distinction of being one of the most highly praised rulers by the Gaelic poets and musicians of his time. His father, Niall Connallagh, had been a celebrated patron of the arts and Sir Turlough Luineach avidly followed his example. He sheltered Uilliam Nuinseann when the poet was accused of conspiracy in the Baltinglass rebellion of 1580.

== Family ==
His second wife, Lady Agnes Campbell, was a daughter of The 3rd Earl of Argyll. One of his daughters was married, as his second wife, to Sorley Boy MacDonnell when he was past the age of eighty years. Another daughter was married to Sir Donnell O'Donnell, a leading figure in Tyrconnell until his death at the Battle of Doire Leathan in 1590. Sir Turlough Luineach's successor was his son, Sir Arthur O'Neill, although Sir Arthur did not succeed him as head of the dynasty. During Tyrone's Rebellion, Sir Arthur initially sided with his distant cousin, The Earl of Tyrone, but then switched sides and served with Sir Henry Docwra's forces out of Derry. Sir Arthur died in 1600, and was succeeded by his own son, Turlough O'Neill.

== See also ==
- An sluagh sidhe so i nEamhuin?
- Kings of Tir Eogain
- Kings of Ailech
- Cenél nEógain

== Sources ==
- Brady, Ciaran (October 2009). "O'Neill, Turlough Luineach". Dictionary of Irish Biography. doi:10.3318/dib.006967.v1. Archived from the original on 12 July 2021.
- Jefferies, Henry A. (23 September 2004). "O'Neill, Sir Turlough Luineach". Oxford Dictionary of National Biography (online ed.). Oxford University Press. doi:10.1093/ref:odnb/20786. (Subscription, Wikipedia Library access or UK public library membership required.)
- Morgan, Hiram (1998). An Introduction to the Study of Political Ideas in Early Modern Ireland (PDF). pp. 1–26. Archived (PDF) from the original on 15 December 2025.
- Morgan, Hiram (1999) [1993]. Tyrone's Rebellion: The outbreak of the Nine Years' War in Tudor Ireland. London: The Boydell Press. ISBN 0-85115-683-5.
- Sheridan, James (2021). "The aftermath of the death of Shane O'Neill in Tyrone and the rise of Turlough Luineach O'Neill (1567–72)". Seanchas Ardmhacha: Journal of the Armagh Diocesan Historical Society. 27 (2): 82–111. doi:10.2307/48747417. ISSN 0488-0196.
