= Mary O'Donnell (Irish noblewoman) =

Irish noblewoman (died 1662)

- Died: 1662; Ireland
- Spouses: Donnell Ballagh O'Cahan (m. 1593; sep. 1598); Teigue O'Rourke (m. 1599; died 1605)
- Father: Hugh McManus O'Donnell

Mary O'Donnell (Irish: Máire Ní Domhnaill; died 1662) was a Gaelic Irish noblewoman of the O'Donnell clan of Tyrconnell.

== Family background ==
Mary was a daughter of Hugh McManus O'Donnell, Lord of Tyrconnell and chief of the O'Donnell clan. Mary's siblings included Hugh Roe, Rory, Manus, Cathbarr, Nuala and Margaret.

== Marriages ==
=== Donnell Ballagh O'Cahan ===
In June 1593, the O'Cahan clan, principal vassals of Hugh O'Neill, Earl of Tyrone, acknowledged Tyrone as their lord. Around the same time, Donnell Ballagh O'Cahan (son of the O'Cahan clan chief) married Mary. O'Cahan and Mary had a son (named Rory Oge O'Cahan) and a daughter.

From 1593 to 1603, Tyrone and Hugh Roe were the principal leaders of an Irish confederacy which opposed English rule in Ireland. This war is known as the Nine Years' War.

In 1598, O'Cahan succeeded to the O'Cahan chieftainship following his father's death. By that same year, Hugh Roe had divorced his wife Rose (Tyrone's daughter), which caused major tension between Hugh Roe and Tyrone. O'Cahan renewed his alliance with Tyrone by leaving Mary and marrying Rose. It seems O'Cahan was never formally divorced from Mary which created enmity between him and his new father-in-law.

=== Teigue O'Rourke ===
Teigue O'Rourke was captured by Hugh Roe in early 1598. O'Donnell forced Teigue to marry Mary, in order to formalise an alliance and antagonise Teigue's brother Brian Oge, who had defected from the confederacy. They had two sons named Brian and Hugh. Brian was the eldest.

In contrast, Francis Martin O'Donnell believes that Mary's sister Margaret was the woman married to Teigue O'Rourke. In 1922, Paul Walsh stated that the woman married to Teigue was neither Mary nor Margaret, but another sister of Hugh Roe. However by 1929, Walsh identified Mary as Teigue O'Rourke's wife.

Teigue died in 1605 and was buried in Creevelea Abbey. Mary presented a chalice (now preserved in St Aidan's Church, Butlersbridge) to the monastery in his memory.

== Post-war ==
Following the end of the Nine Years' War in 1603, various British politicians attempted to undo Tyrone by harnessing a land rights dispute between Tyrone and O'Cahan. George Montgomery, the Protestant Bishop of Derry, encouraged O'Cahan to leave Rose and return to Mary, who he was apparently never actually legally divorced from. Montgomery wrote to Chichester on 4 March 1607: "the breach between [O'Cahan] and his landlord [Tyrone] will be the greater by means of [Tyrone's] daughter, his reputed wife, whom he has resolved to leave, having a former wife lawfully married to him." In 1607 O'Cahan repudiated his marriage to Rose and married another woman named Honora.

Mary did not take part in the Flight of the Earls in 1607.

Mary's son Brian O'Rourke was made a ward of court. During this time, the Crown was sending the sons of Gaelic Irish lords to Dublin or England to be re-educated as English gentlemen. Brian was sent to university, admitted to the Middle Temple, and ultimately imprisoned in the Tower of London.

Mary was assigned a proportion of 1,600 acres for the duration of her life. In 1631, Viscount Gormanston and another individual had a patent for the estate on her death.

Mary died in 1662, in Ireland. Her sister Margaret predeceased her.

== Legacy ==
During their lifetimes, Mary and her sister Margaret were the subjects of a poem. The poem, written in Ireland, sympathises with the two sisters on the deaths of their four brothers. It was composed before Margaret's departure for the Spanish Netherlands in 1622.

Original Irish	English translation
Truagh liom Máire agus Mairghréag ní beó I bláth na n-umhail-ghéag do chuir siad a nduille dhiobh dhá bhuime iad don imshniomh	I pity Mary and Margaret they will not live in the flower of the humble branches they have shed their leaves they are two treasures for the soul
