= Battle of Doire Leathan =

Battle of Derrylahan
- Part of the O'Donnell Succession Dispute
Date	14 September 1590
Location	Doire Leathan (Derrylahan), County Donegal, Ulster, Kingdom of Ireland
Result	Sir Donnell O'Donnell killed

Belligerents
Supporters of Sir Hugh McManus O'Donnell and Red Hugh O'Donnell	Supporters of Sir Donnell O'Donnell

Commanders and leaders
Finola MacDonald	Sir Donnell O'Donnell †

The Battle of Doire Leathan took place on 14 September 1590 at Doire Leathan (English: Derrylahan), a townland and hamlet located between Kilcar and Carrick in south-western County Donegal in Ulster, Ireland. Derrylahan is on the eastern shores of Teelin Bay, being just across from the village of Teelin. The battle was part of the ongoing succession dispute for the leadership of the Gaelic lordship of O'Donnell. A combined force of Irish clans and Scottish Redshank mercenaries hired by Iníon Dubh (pronounced 'In-neen Doo') defeated and killed Sir Domhnall Ó Domhnaill (Sir Donnell O'Donnell). The Tanist of Tír Conaill, Sir Domhnall's younger half-brother and Iníon Dubh's son, Red Hugh O'Donnell, was still imprisoned in Dublin Castle, but later rose following a subsequent escape to lead Clan O'Donnell and was a prominent figure during the Nine Years War.

According to the Annals of the Four Masters, "The son of O'Donnell, i.e. Donnell, the son of Hugh, son of Manus, son of Hugh Duv, son of Hugh Roe, son of Niall Garv, son of Turlough of the Wine, attempted to depose his father, after he had grown weak and feeble from age, and after his other son had been imprisoned in Dublin; so that Donnell brought under his power and jurisdiction that part of Tirconnell from the mountain westwards, i.e. from Bearnas to the River Drowes; and also the people of Boylagh and Tir-Boghaine. It was a cause of great anguish and sickness of mind to Ineenduv, the daughter of James Mac Donnell, that Donnell should make such an attempt, lest he might attain the chieftainship of Tirconnell in preference to her son, Hugh Roe, who was confined in Dublin, and who she hoped would become chief, whatever time God might permit him to return from his captivity; and she, therefore, assembled all the Kinel-Connell who were obedient to her husband, namely, O'Doherty, with his forces; Mac Sweeny-na dTuath (Owen Oge), with his forces; and Mac Sweeny Fanad, with his forces; with a great number of Scots along with them. After Donnell O'Donnell had received intelligence that this muster had been made to oppose him, he assembled his forces to meet them. These were they who rose up to assist him on this occasion: Mac Sweeny Banagh (Donough, the son of Mulmurry); a party of the Clann-Sweeny of Munster, under the conduct of the three sons of Owen, the son of Mulmurry, son of Donough, son of Turlough, and their forces; and O'Boyle (Teige Oge, the son of Teige, son of Turlough), with all his forces, assembled. The place where the son of O'Donnell happened to be stationed along with these chieftains was Doire-leathan at the extremity of Tir-Boghaine, to the west of Gleann Choluim Cille. The other party did not halt until they came to them to that place; and a battle ensued between them, which was fiercely fought on both sides. The Scots discharged a shower of arrows from their elastic bows, by which they pierced and wounded great numbers, and, among the rest, the son of O'Donnell himself, who, being unable to display prowess or defend himself, was slain at Doire-leathan, on one side of the harbour of Telinn, on the 14th of September. Seldom before that time had his enemies triumphed over him; and the party by whom he was slain had not been by any means his enemies until they encountered on this occasion; and although this Donnell was not the rightful heir of his father, it would have been no disgrace to Tirconnell to have elected him as its chief, had he been permitted to attain to that dignity. In this conflict were slain along with Donnell the three sons of Owen, son of Mulmurry, son of Donough above mentioned, together with two hundred others, around Donnell."

== Bibliography ==
- Morgan, Hiram. Tyrone's Rebellion. Boydell Press, 1999.
