= Micheline Kerney Walsh =

Irish archivist and historian

- Born: Micheline Kerney; 21 October 1919; La Celle-Saint-Cloud, Seine-et-Oise (Yvelines)
- Died: 8 May 1997 (aged 77); Mespil Estate, Dublin, Ireland

Micheline Kerney Walsh (21 October 1919 – 8 May 1997) was an Irish archivist and historian.

== Early life and family ==
Micheline Kerney Walsh was born in La Celle-Saint-Cloud near Paris on 21 October 1919. Her parents were Leopold H. Kerney and Raymonde (née Élie) from Bordeaux. She had two brothers, John and Eamon. She attended the Cross and Passion Convent, Kilcullen, County Kildare, Loreto College, Madrid, and Loreto College, St Stephen's Green, Dublin. She entered University College Dublin (UCD) in 1938, graduating with a BA in languages in 1941. On 30 September 1941 she married Richard Brazil Walsh (18 October 1914 - 1992). They had three sons and three daughters, Terence, Micheline, Aideen, Monique, Ronan and Michael.

== Career ==
Kerney Walsh joined the staff of the Overseas Archives in UCD in 1954 when it was established by Professor Patrick McBride. She published The O'Neills in Spain and The McDonnells of Antrim on the Continent in 1960, along with the first in her four-volume Spanish knights of Irish origin with the subsequent volumes appearing in 1965, 1970, and 1978. Her research focused on individuals, such as her contributions to on the women of the Wild Geese, Irishmen in the imperial service, and on Hugh O'Neill in The Irish Sword, a journal of the Military History Society of Ireland. She was elected to the council of the Military History Society in 1980, and became the society's first woman vice-president in 1986.

She published 11 articles with the journal of Cumann Seanchais Ard Mhacha, Seanchas Ard Mhacha, on the O'Neills and other Irish–Spanish connections. The society published her book in 1986, Destruction by peace: Hugh O'Neill after Kinsale. At a welcoming ceremony for the king and queen of Spain at St Patrick's College, Maynooth in July 1986, Kerney Walsh presented a copy of her book to King Juan Carlos. For her work on the historic links between Spain and Ireland, in 1988 she was the first Irish woman to be awarded the decoration Order of Isabella the Catholic. She was conferred with a doctorate of literature on published work in 1988 by the National University of Ireland.

== Death and legacy ==
She died at her family home, 20 Elm House, Mespil Estate, Dublin, on 8 May 1997. She bequeathed her personal collection of overseas archives to the Cardinal Tomás Ó Fiaich Memorial Library and Archive, Armagh, which was opened on 8 May 1999. The remaining portion of her overseas archives were donated to the library and archive of UCD.
