= Manus O'Donnell (died 1600) =

Irish nobleman (died 1600)

- Born: c. 1579; Tyrconnell, Ireland
- Died: October 1600 (aged ~21); Donegal, Tyrconnell, Ireland
- Buried: Donegal Abbey
- Father: Hugh McManus O'Donnell
- Mother: Iníon Dubh

Manus O'Donnell (Irish: Maghnas Ó Domhnaill; c. 1579 – October 1600) was an Irish nobleman and member of the O'Donnell dynasty.

Manus was born c. 1579, the third son of Hugh McManus O'Donnell, Irish Gaelic Lord of Tyrconnell, and his second wife Iníon Dubh. Manus had two older brothers, Hugh Roe and Rory, and a younger brother Cathbarr. He also had several sisters – Nuala, Mary and Margaret.

Manus was wounded by his loyalist cousin Niall Garve O'Donnell during the Battle of Lifford. He was brought back to Donegal, where he died. (Note: The 17th-century historian Lughaidh Ó Cléirigh states that Manus died on 22 October [O.S. 12 October] 1600, from injuries sustained in the Battle of Lifford. Contemporary English sources state that the Battle of Lifford occurred on [O.S. 24 October], which makes Ó Cléirigh's date incorrect.) He was buried in Donegal Abbey.
