= Hiram Morgan =

Irish historian

- Born: 1960 (age 65–66); Belfast
- Education: Our Lady and St. Patrick's College, Knock; St Catharine's College, Cambridge
- Occupation: historian
- Known for: expert on the Nine Years War
- Notable work: see Publications

Hiram Morgan (born 1960) is an Irish historian. He is an expert on the Nine Years War (1594–1603), the career of Hugh O'Neill (1550–1616) and Ireland's connections with Europe and beyond. He was chairman of the Royal Irish Academy Committee for Historical Sciences from 2003 to 2007.

== Early life ==
Morgan was born in Belfast in 1960. He was educated at Our Lady and St. Patrick's College, Knock and at St Catharine's College, Cambridge. He teaches at University College Cork.

== Publications ==
His main works are:

- Monograph:
  - Tyrone's rebellion: the outbreak of the Nine Years War in Tudor Ireland' (Woodbridge: Boydell & Brewer, April 1993), no. 67 in The Royal Historical Society Studies in History series.
- Edited Books:
  - Political Ideology in Ireland, 1541–1641' (Dublin: Four Courts Press, 1999).
  - Information, Media and Power through the Ages (Dublin: University College Dublin Press, 2001).
  - The Battle of Kinsale (Bray: Wordwell Books, March 2004).
- Translation/Scholarly Edition
  - With John Barry, Great Deeds in Ireland, Richard Stanihurst's De Rebus in Hibernia Gestis (Leiden, 1584), (Cork University Press, 2013).
- Journal
  - A founder and co-editor (1992-2002) of History Ireland, the illustrated magazine dealing with all aspects of Irish history.
- Websites
  - Morgan is director of the world's largest online site for Irish Studies: CELT (Corpus of Electronic Text of Ireland)
