= Donal Oge O'Donnell =

Irish noble (c. 1585 – 1620)

Donal Oge O'Donnell (Irish: Domhnall Óg Ó Domhnaill; c. 1585 – 5 September 1620) was an Irish noble of the O'Donnell clan.

== Life ==
Born c. 1585, he was the only son of Sir Donal O'Donnell, who was killed in action at 1590's Battle of Doire Leathan.

Whilst en route to Kinsale, O'Donnell travelled to Ardfert, where he spent several years in alliance with FitzMaurice, Lord of Kerry. In 1607 he took part in the Flight of the Earls, travelling with his kinsmen to Continental Europe. He joined Spanish forces in Flanders.

O'Donnell died on 5 September 1620, and was buried in the former Franciscan Chapel of Saint Anthony of Padua, beneath the old High Altar, in St Anthony's College, Leuven, Belgium.

He has descendants living in France.
