= Emmett O'Byrne =

Irish historian (born 1973)

Emmett O'Byrne (born 30 November 1973) is an Irish historian whose primary research interests are the history of Medieval Ireland and Early Modern Ireland, focusing in particular on Gaelic Ireland. Further research interests include the development of the common law in Ireland from 1169, competing laws among the marches of medieval Ireland and the peoples and frontiers of medieval Europe.

== Biography ==
O'Byrne was educated at De La Salle College, Wicklow, and at St Peter's College, Wexford. From 1992 to 1995, he studied history and classics in University College, Dublin (UCD), receiving his BA in 1995. He attended Trinity College, Dublin (TCD), to study for an MPhil in medieval history, completing his masters in 1996. He spent much of 1997 working in northern Israel on Kibbutz Ga'aton, travelling widely through the Middle East. In late 1997, he returned to Ireland to begin a doctoral thesis on the Irish of Leinster, 1156–1606, for which he was awarded a doctorate in July 2001.

During the years 1999–2003, O'Byrne worked as a contributor to the Royal Irish Academy's Dictionary of Irish Biography (DIB), completing some two hundred and twenty eight biographical articles on Irish historical figures. Further publications have appeared in various collections of essays on Irish history and contributions to the Medieval Encyclopaedia of Ireland. His book, War, politics and the Irish of Leinster, 1156–1606, was published by Four Courts Press in 2003, receiving critical acclaim in a number of international journals such as Speculum (2005), The English Historical Review (2005) and Celtica (2007).

In September 2003, he was awarded a post doctoral fellowship at the Mícheál Ó Cléirigh Institute for the Study of Irish History and Civilisation at University College, Dublin (UCD), holding that position until its expiration in late 2006. In the interim years, O'Byrne, with Dr. Edel Breathnach, organised an international conference in 2005 at UCD entitled "The March in Medieval West, 1000–1500", attracting several renowned historians. With Dr. Jenifer Ní Ghrádaigh of University College, Cork (UCC), he has edited the proceedings of this conference published in 2010.

In 2006, O'Byrne was appointed historical advisor to the Wicklow 400 Commemoration Celebrations, writing a number of articles in the Wicklow Times and the Wicklow People newspapers. Since 2007 he has been employed by Carlow Institute of Technology as a lecturer in law, having received his BA in Legal Studies from the Dublin Institute of Technology (DIT) in November 2005. In March 2009, he was elected to serve a three-year term on the Academic Council of Carlow Institute of Technology. In 2015, O'Byrne completed a biography of Feagh McHugh O'Byrne (d.1597).

== Bibliography ==
=== Books ===
- War, Politics and the Irish of Leinster, 1156–1606 (Dublin, 2003)

=== Articles ===
- "'A Divided Loyalty': The MacMurroughs, the Irish of Leinster and the Crown of England, 1340–1420" in W. Nolan & T. McGrath (eds), Carlow: History & Society (Dublin, 2008)
- "The MacMurroughs and the marches of Leinster, 1170–1340" in L. Doran & J. Lyttleton (eds), Lordship in Medieval Ireland: Image and Reality (Dublin, 2008)
- "The Making and Shiring in Wicklow" in L. Price, The Placenames of Co. Wicklow (Dublin, 2006)
- "The Irish of Kildare, 1000–1270" in W. Nolan & T. McGrath (eds), Kildare: History & Society (Dublin, 2006)
- Three Articles on The Making of the County of Wicklow were published over three issues in The Wicklow People & The Wicklow Times newspapers in February 2006.
- Review in Speculum (Summer, 2006) of S. Kingston, Ulster and the Isles in the Fifteenth Century: the lordship of the Clann Domhnaill of Antrim (Dublin, 2004.)
- "One World: the communities of the Dublin Marches", History Ireland (Summer, 2005)
- "Cultures in Contact in the Dublin Marches" in S. Duffy (ed) Medieval Dublin V (Dublin, 2004)
- 8 entries in Duffy, MacShamhrain & Moynes (eds) Medieval Encyclopaedia of Ireland (New York, 2004)
- Review in Irish Historical Studies (Winter, 2004) of B. Smith (ed.), The Register of Nicholas Fleming, Archbishop of Armagh, 1404–1416 (Dublin, 2003)
- Review in Irish Historical Studies (Winter, 2004) of C. O'Sullivan, Hospitality in Medieval Ireland, 900–1500 (Dublin, 2004).

"The Walshes and the Massacre at Carrickmines", Archaeology Ireland, 17 no. 3, issue 65 (2003)

- "A much disputed land: Carrickminesand the Dublin Marches", in S. Duffy (ed), Medieval Dublin IV (Dublin, 2003)
- "On the frontier: Carrickmines and Gaelic Leinster", Archaeology Ireland, 16, no. 3, issue 63 (2002)
- "The trend in the warfare in Gaelic Leinster", The Irish Sword, 22, no. 88 (Winter, 2000)
- "The rise of the Gabhal Raghnaill', in C.O'Brien (ed), Feagh McHugh O'Byrne: the Wicklow Firebrand (Dublin, 1995)
- "The battle of Glenmalure, 25 August 1580: cause and course", in C. O'Brien (ed), Feagh McHugh O'Byrne: the Wicklow Firebrand (Dublin, 1999)

== Sources ==
- E.O'Byrne, War, Politics and the Irish of Leinster (Dublin, 2003), p. vii
- Speculum 80 (2005), 1345–47
- English Historical Review 120 (2005), 437–39
- Celtica 25 (2007), 26
