= Redshank (soldier) =

16th-century Scottish mercenaries

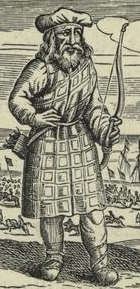
A Highland mercenary fighting in Europe during the Thirty Years War, with a bow, plaid and blue bonnet.

Redshank was a nickname for Scottish mercenaries from the Highlands and Western Isles contracted to fight in Ireland; they were a prominent feature of Irish armies throughout the 16th century. They were called redshanks because they went dressed in plaids and waded bare-legged through rivers in the coldest weather. An alternative etymology, illustrated by Jamieson by a quote from Sir Walter Scott, is that it referred to the untanned deer leather buskins worn by Highlanders, although Jamieson notes that Scott's source, John Elder of Caithness, actually stated its origin was from their habit of going "bare-legged and bare-footed". The term was not derogatory, as the English were in general impressed with the redshanks' qualities as soldiers.

== Weapons ==
The redshanks were usually armed alike, principally with bows (the short bow of Scotland and Ireland, rather than the longbow of Wales and England) and, initially, two-handed claymores or Lochaber axes. English observers reported that some Highlanders fighting in Ireland wore chain mail, long obsolete elsewhere.

Later in the period, they may have adopted the targe and single-handed broadsword, a style of weaponry originally fashionable in early 16th-century Spain from where its use could have spread to Ireland. Combined with the use of muskets, this credited by some writers to have influenced the development of what was later referred to as the "highland charge", a tactic of firing a single coordinated musket volley before closing at a run with sword and targe. However, this is strongly disputed and evidence from earlier periods such as at the first Battle of Inverlochy or the Stettin Woodblock of 1631 indicate that the volley and charge tactic originates in earlier tactics such as the "Boars Snout" to smash shield walls and in the mobile tactics of the Cathearneachd. Many clan levies, however, could have remained relatively poorly armed.

== Origins ==
Many redshanks came from the clans of the Hebrides. Others originated from the poorer clans of mainland Scotland. Their presence was, in general, an indication of the politically unsettled conditions in the west of the country during the period, particularly following the breakup of the Lordship of the Isles at the end of the 15th century. Other than the Clan Donald, who had furnished Irish lords with soldiers in earlier times under the gallowglass system, the men were mostly drawn from the clans of MacLeod, MacQuarrie, MacLean, Campbell, and MacKay, and were often drawn to contract themselves out due to poverty and overpopulation in their home areas. There are records of men of other clans being hired, such as in 1564 when Sorley Boy MacDonnell procured a group of MacGregors, led by their chief, for a season's campaigning in Ulster. A further source of manpower was the tenantry of the MacDonnells of Antrim, recent Hebridean settlers in north-eastern Ireland.

Their first recorded use was in 1428, when Niall Garve O'Donnell imported a large force of Scots mercenaries to assist in the siege of Carrickfergus Castle. Unlike the gallowglass, who were hired for long periods of service, were generally settled in Ireland and paid in land and beef, the redshanks were hired for the summer months, often on three month contracts. They were billeted (housed) with civilians, usually by force. This was known as the buannacht system. As the custom of mercenary hire spread from its origin in the north of the country, the scale and destructiveness of warfare in Ireland steadily increased. Mercenary hire was often founded on family links, with Shane O'Neill's alliance by marriage with the MacLeans and Campbells facilitating his importation of fighting men from those clans.

As the Elizabethan conflict in Ireland proceeded to its culmination in the Nine Years' War, the use of seasonal Scottish mercenaries was further expanded, as the gallowglass system could not meet the demands posed by the extremely large armies that Elizabeth I employed in Ireland. Despite this, the English never considered engaging the redshanks on a large scale themselves, although Lord Deputy Russell advocated it, and gallowglasses had been employed in the early years of Elizabeth's reign. This initial period of the redshanks' employment ended with the final collapse of native Irish resistance in 1603.

== Use in the Confederate Wars ==
In the mid 17th century, a large number of Scottish Highlanders, also often called "redshanks", fought in the Irish Confederate Wars, notably the clansmen serving under Alasdair Mac Colla, himself a member of a minor Hebridean branch of Clan Donald (a cadet family of Macdonald of Dunnyveg). However, the Highlanders who fought at Dungan's Hill and Knocknanuss were to be the last of the redshanks. The subsequent Cromwellian conquest of Ireland saw the end of the employment of Highland mercenaries, both through the destruction of their employers, the Irish nobility, and the pacification of the Highlands.
