= Tanistry =

Gaelic inheritance system

Tanistry was a system of inheritance practised by the Gaelic nobilities of Ireland, the Isle of Man, and parts of modern Scotland. It was distinctive in having an elected heir known as the tanist (Irish: tánaiste; Scottish Gaelic: tànaiste; Manx: tanishtey). This system was used to select the Chiefs of the Name (head of a clan) and the rulers of the various Gaelic kingdoms in Ireland and in Scotland.

When the chief or king died they were immediately succeeded by the tanist, who had typically been elected years earlier. A new election was then held to select the next tanist. This differs from other systems of elective inheritance, in that an heir was elected in advance of a vacancy, not after the vacancy arose. Valid candidates for the election were restricted to male members of the title holder's sept (extended family); the exact eligibility criteria differed between Ireland and Scotland. The electorate was identical to the set of valid candidates i.e. potential heirs would select a tanist from amongst themselves.

This system ensured that the heir was known in advance (avoiding an interregnum), was always an adult and usually of mature age (avoiding a childhood regency), and kept the title within the sept without being dominated by a single family line. It was very rare to elect a son of the current ruler, instead the tanist would typically be from a different branch of the family. This often led to an informal rotation between several powerful branches. Elections could be controversial and encouraged ambition within the sept, but once a tanist had been elected their succession was usually not contested.

Tanistry is older than recorded history in these regions. It was established in Ireland by the 4th century AD, and subsequently transmitted to Scotland where it merged with the Pictish system. Tanistry operated for multiple centuries, well into the Middle Ages. As English- and Scots-speaking peoples gradually conquered the Gaels, they replaced tanistry with primogeniture. However tanistry persisted in Gaelic-speaking families, particularly for local chiefs, until the 17th century. The terminology was reused by the Republic of Ireland in its 1937 constitution, which established a deputy prime minister known as the Tánaiste.

== Origins ==
Historically the tanist was chosen from among the heads of the roydammna or "righdamhna" (literally, those of kingly material) or, alternatively, among all males of the sept, and elected by them in full assembly. The eligibility was based on descent from a king to a few degrees of proximity. Usually descent from the male lines of a king was the norm, however in Scotland, descent through the female lines of a king was also accepted, possibly because of an intermingling with the Pictish succession rules. An example of this is King Eochaid who claimed the Scottish throne as the son of the daughter of Kenneth I.

The composition and the governance of the clan were built upon descent from a similar ancestor. The office was noted from the beginning of recorded history in Ireland, and probably pre-dates it. (Note: According to the evidence in the annals, tanistry originated only about century after the Anglo-Norman invasion.) A story about Cormac mac Airt refers to his eldest son as his tanist. Following his murder by a member of the Deisi, another roydammna, Eochaid Gonnat, succeeded as king.

In Ireland, the tanistry continued among the dominant dynasties, as well as lesser lords and chieftains, until the mid-16th/early 17th century when it was replaced by English common law. When in 1943 Ireland appointed its first new Chief Herald, it did not reintroduce tanistry. The state granted courtesy recognition to Irish chiefs based on primogeniture from the last known chief.

The royal succession in Celtic Scotland was limited to the elective succession of the male descendants of Siol Alpein (House of Alpin) until the accession of King Malcolm II in 1005. This monarch was the first to introduce the concept of hereditary monarchy in Scotland. He did so to try to eliminate the strife caused by the elective law, which encouraged rival claimants to fight for the throne. The earlier Pictish kingdoms had allowed female-line succession to the throne and in middle age Scotland, Pictish and Gaelic succession rules were intermingled. Since Malcolm had only daughters, the throne passed to his grandson through his eldest daughter and later, their descendants. The Irish monarchies, for their part, never at any stage allowed for female line succession.

== Candidates and functions ==
The king or chief held office for life and was required by custom to be of full age, in possession of all his faculties, and without any remarkable blemish of mind or body. At the same time, and subject to the same conditions, a tanist or next heir to the monarchy was elected, who if the king died or became disqualified, at once became king. Typically a former king's son became tanist, sometimes the son of the king simultaneously elected but more often a son of a rival branch of the dynasty. Election was based on the principle that the dignity of chieftainship descend to the eldest and most worthy agnate of the last ruler; this differs from the system of primogeniture. Tanistry still disqualified many in the clan, as most clansmen were clients, not related to the ruling line, patrilineally or otherwise.

The flag of Ulster with the Red Hand.

One of the most common rules for qualification as a roydammna was that a candidate had to be a member of the previous chief's "derbfhine", a kindred including all descended in the male line from a common great-grandfather. However, it was often restricted to the chief's gelfhine, a fine descended from one common (patrilineal) grandfather. This meant that the group became highly exclusive, keeping the kingship within the dynasty. Many in the wider clan might be reduced to gentry or peasant status (though they might share the surname). These features make tanistry an agnatic succession mode, and a succession by appointment, as it was an elective monarchy. Tanistry evades the basic requirement of the hereditary monarchy, i.e. that the outcome of the succession is predictable, up to the identity of successor and next heirs, by genealogy.

The downside of the large group of eligibles was that increases in roydammna in each generation might lead to internecine dynastic civil war. Such was the case among the descendants of King and High King Tairrdelbach Ua Conchobair (1088–1156). His dynasty, the Uí Briúin, had successfully ruled as Kings of Connacht since at least the mid-5th century. Their increasing consolidation via the annexation of the Kingdoms of Mide and Dublin, plus suborning neighboring states and lordships to vassalage, led to Tairrdelbach becoming the first of his dynasty to become High King.

Competition between Tairrdelbach's many sons caused corrosive warfare among at least four competing main lines, in addition to allied lordships' and kingdoms' striving for the main chance. Coupled with the incursions of the Normans from 1169 onwards, this fragmented Ó Conchobhar rule. By the mid-13th century, they were reduced to ruling a fraction of their former patrimony.

Another example of Derbfhine or Roydammna proliferation comes from the Annals of Connacht. It states that at the Second Battle of Athenry in August 1316, in addition to King Tadc Ó Cellaig of Uí Maine, "there fell with him ... twenty-eight men who were entitled to succeed to the kingship of Uí Maine."

== Consequences ==
The tanistry system often led to rotation among the most prominent branches of the clan or the reigning house, particularly in the Middle Ages. Though not necessarily intended to be so, tanistry was perceived to create balance between branches of family. A quite usual pattern was that the chief (king, lord) was succeeded by his tanist, elected earlier and from a branch different from that to which the incumbent chief belonged. Perhaps simultaneously upon that succession, a tanist was elected from another branch to fill the position vacated by the one now risen to chieftainship. He may have come from the branch to which the deceased belonged. The next vacancy would be handled in a similar way. If a chieftain attempted to have his own son (or brother) chosen over a representative of another branch, the electors were outraged, as they feared subjugation to one branch.

In 1296, the Bruce candidate to inherit the crown of Scotland pleaded the traditional tanistry in his favour. In terms of primogeniture, he was from a cadet branch of the old royal descent, and thus would not have succeeded. The idea of rotation and balance (and his seniority in age and experience) made him a credible competitor. A Pictish aspect was that both the House of Balliol and House of Bruce descended through female lines from the royal house, and were allowed to present candidacy. Bruce also claimed tanistry through a female line. This may be an indication that in Scotland, Pictish and Gaelic succession rules were intermingled. The judicial resolution of the succession quarrel, directed by the English king, favoured the Balliols on the basis of primogeniture. Subsequent political events reverted that result to a more "clannish-tradition" direction. Robert the Bruce, grandson of the candidate who argued for tanistry, ascended the throne despite descending from a rather junior cadet line of the original Royal House. All future monarchs of Scotland after that succeeded by the rights of the Bruce.

Tanistry as the system of succession left the headship open to the ambitious. It was a frequent source of strife both in families and between the clans, but it was conversely quasi-democratic. Tanistry was abolished by a legal decision during the reign of James VI of Scotland, who later was named James I of England and Ireland. The English land law was substituted.

The rules of succession of the House of Alpin of Scottish monarchs (a dynasty of mixed Pictish and Gaelic origin) and their successors abided by tanistry rules until at least 1034. They also used them in certain successions in the 1090s, and tanistry was used as an argument in succession litigation as late as the 1290s. A similar system operated in Wales, where, under Welsh law, any of the sons or brothers of the king could be chosen as the edling, or heir to the kingdom.

== Tanistry ==
In the broadest sense, the name tanistry describes the functional principle that "the most talented male member of the royal dynasty should inherit the throne, commonly by murder and war".

It is specifically used to describe the practical ramifications of the Turco-Mongol, as well as other Central Asian steppe nomad, principles of inheritance and succession. Because all male members of the royal clan are considered to have equally legitimate claims on power, the ruler is the individual who eliminates competitors and re-subjugates the rest of the state formation. The structure may be determined by bonds of personal loyalty to the ruler, which are considered to be dissolved on the ruler's death.

== See also ==
- Chief of the Name – Head of a family or clan
- Elective monarchy – Monarchy ruled by an elected ruler

== Sources ==
- Bryne, Francis John (1973). Irish Kings and High Kings. Dublin, IE: Four Courts Press. ISBN 978-1-85182-489-2.
