= Siege of Enniskillen (1594) =

Siege in Ireland during the Nine Years' War

- Part of the Nine Years' War
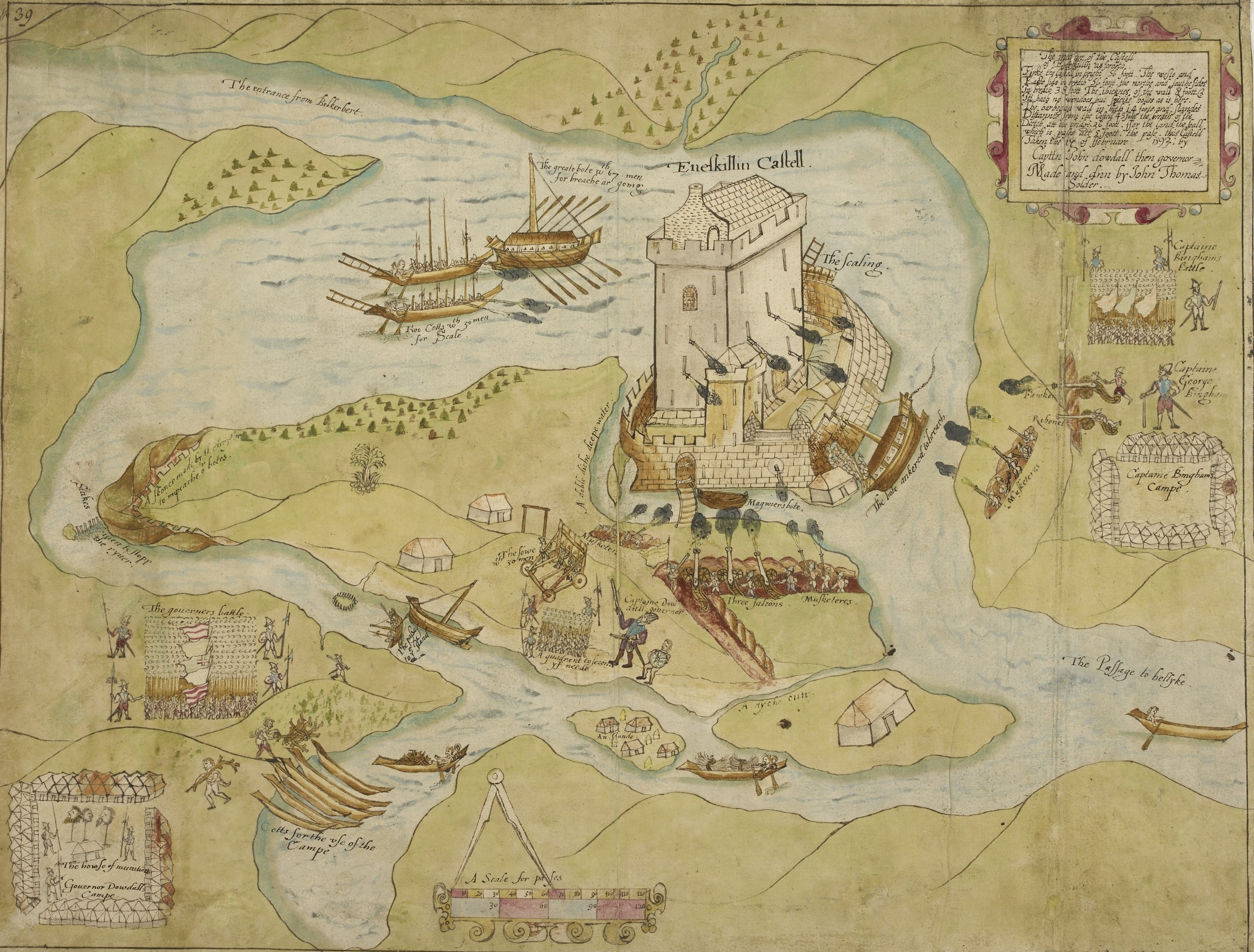
- Contemporaneous map of Dowdall's first siege
Date	January – February 1594, May 1594 – May 1595
Location	Enniskillen, County Fermanagh, Northern Ireland
Result	Irish victory

Belligerents
(Kingdom of England) England: (Kingdom of Ireland) Loyalists	Irish Alliance

Commanders and leaders
John Dowdall (1st siege); James Eccarsall (2nd siege)	Hugh Maguire; Hugh Roe O'Donnell; Cormac MacBaron O'Neill

Strength
75	2,000

The siege of Enniskillen took place at Enniskillen in Fermanagh, present day Northern Ireland, in 1594 and 1595, during the Nine Years' War. In February 1594, the English had captured Enniskillen Castle from the Irish after a waterborne assault and massacred the defenders after they surrendered. From May 1594, an Irish army under Hugh Maguire and Cormac MacBaron O'Neill besieged the English garrison in the castle, and in August they defeated an English relief force. A second relief force was allowed to resupply the garrison, but the castle remained cut off. Eventually, in May 1595, the English garrison surrendered to the Irish, who then massacred them.

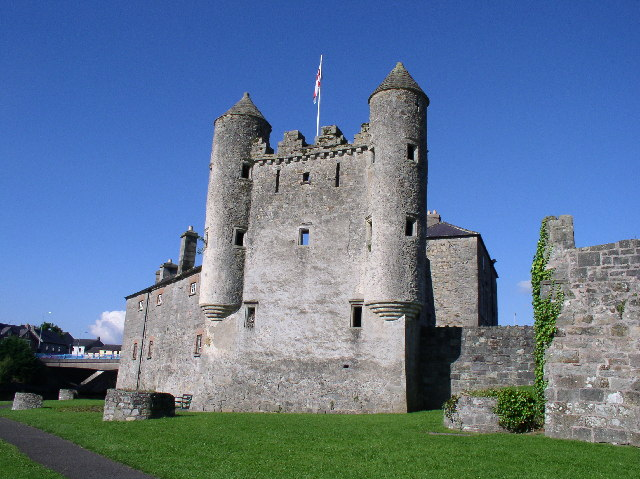
Enniskillen Castle

== Background ==
In 1593, Hugh Maguire, Chief of the Name and Lord of Fermanagh, had objected to the behaviour of the newly-appointed English Crown sheriff Humphrey Willis. As he had done before being expelled by Hugh Roe O'Donnell from Tyrconnell in 1592, Willis was cattle raiding and plundering throughout Clan Maguire territory. Maguire was not strong enough to resist the sheriff, but after receiving reinforcements from Hugh O'Neill, Earl of Tyrone, Maguire expelled Willis. In May and June 1593, Maguire and Brian Oge O'Rourke of West Breifne raided lands held by the English Lord President of Connaught, Richard Bingham. They destroyed the town around Ballymote Castle. This was part of a proxy war waged to distract the Crown while Tyrone strengthened his position in Ulster. As hoped for, the Crown responded by sending an army under Sir Henry Bagenal and Gaelic leader Hugh O'Neill, Earl of Tyrone (outwardly still loyal to the Crown), who defeated Maguire's force at the Battle of Belleek in October 1593. However, Maguire's main force remained unscathed.

== First siege ==
Enniskillen Castle sat on the River Erne and commanded the strategic bottleneck between Upper and Lower Lough Erne. On 25 January 1594, English Captain John Dowdall arrived at Enniskillen by boat with three infantry companies. They dug trenches in which they placed light cannons and musketeers, but the cannons were too small to make much of an impact on the castle walls. On 30 January, Captain George Bingham arrived with 300 men.

They launched a waterborne assault on the castle. While musketeers in boats and artillery on land fired at the castle, a large boat holding 67 men anchored at a vulnerable part of the walls. They made a breach in the wall with pickaxes, forcing the Irish to take shelter in the keep. Dowdall threatened to destroy the castle with gunpowder if the garrison did not surrender. An Irish witness claimed there were 36 fighting men and 40 women and children in the castle, while Dowdall claimed there were 200. After they surrendered, Dowdall had them put to the sword and claimed to have killed 150. Captain Thomas Lee, who was present, described this as a great dishonor to the Queen as the defenders had surrendered "uppon composicion, And your majesties worde being past to the poore beggars that kept it, they were all notwithstandinge dishonourably putt to the sworde in a most miserable state".

Dowdall wrote on 2 February to the Lord Deputy that he had captured the castle from the "rebel" Hugh Maguire. An English garrison was left in place. A detailed coloured illustration of the siege was made shortly after.

== Second siege ==
On 17 May 1594, now acting with the covert support of Tyrone, Hugh Maguire and Cormac MacBaron O'Neill laid siege to Enniskillen which was now isolated in hostile country. Their army consisted of 1,400 foot soldiers and 600 horsemen. It quickly grew with support arriving from Hugh Roe O'Donnell. The English commander, James Eccarsall, had only 50 foot soldiers and 24 horsemen to defend the castle, along with some light artillery. Eccarsall launched a sortie by boat but had to retreat under heavy fire. Irish fortifications cut off access by river and the castle was attacked nightly. Many of the garrison fell sick due to food shortages and exhaustion brought on by incessant skirmishing with the Irish.

On 7 August, Maguire and his allies defeated an English relief force for Enniskillen at the Battle of the Ford of the Biscuits. A second relief force commanded by the Lord Deputy William Russell was sent by another route. Although it was not attacked by the Irish, none of Russell's scouts or messengers reached the castle nor returned. Russell relieved the beleaguered garrison by 30 August with six months supplies, then withdrew. Following this, there was a truce, but "subterfuge and deception were the hallmarks of this stage of the war".

== Third siege ==
Maguire raised the clan and the castle was again attacked in January 1595. This time, forty picked men dressed in chain mail and armed with Lochaber axes attacked at night. His men overran the outer defences but the garrison held out in the tower. The Irish withdrew but took with them the garrison's three boats, preventing the English from patrolling the Erne and cutting them off.

The garrison's plight was not lost on the authorities in Dublin, but the Crown did not have enough troops for a relief force, and Lord Deputy Russell considered withdrawing the garrison. A report to the Lord Deputy suggested that Clan Maguire planned to bring down the walls with gunpowder. In May 1595 the garrison agreed to surrender Enniskillen to the Irish in exchange for their lives. However, the entire garrison was then massacred. Russell claimed that the garrison had surrendered on terms to Cormac MacBaron O'Neill, who then reneged upon his word and had the surrendered garrison executed en masse. This was inconsistent with the treatment of other English garrisons, such as the Blackwater Fort, who were granted liberal terms to leave their position in February 1595. However, the Enniskillen garrison may also have been slain as retaliation for Dowdall's similar violation of the surrender terms and massacre of Clan Maguire's defenders of the castle and their families in the year before.

== Bibliography ==
- Falls, Cyril. Elizabeth's Irish Wars. Constable, 1996.
- Heath, Ian (1993). The Irish Wars, 1485-1603. Osprey Publishing.
- Morgan, Hiram (1999). Tyrone's Rebellion. Boydell Press.
- O'Neill, James (2016). "Three sieges and two massacres: Enniskillen and the outbreak of the Nine Years War, 1593-5". The Irish Sword. XXX (121): 241–249.
- O'Neill, James (2016b). "Maguire's revolt but Tyrone's war: proxy war in Fermanagh 1593–4". Seanchas Ardmhacha: Journal of the Armagh Diocesan Historical Society. 26 (1): 42–68. ISSN 0488-0196.
- O'Neill, James (2017). The Nine Years War, 1593-1603: O'Neill, Mountjoy and the Military Revolution. Dublin: Four Courts Press. ISBN 978-1-84682-754-9.
