= Assault on the Blackwater Fort =

1595 engagement in Ireland

- Part of the Nine Years' War
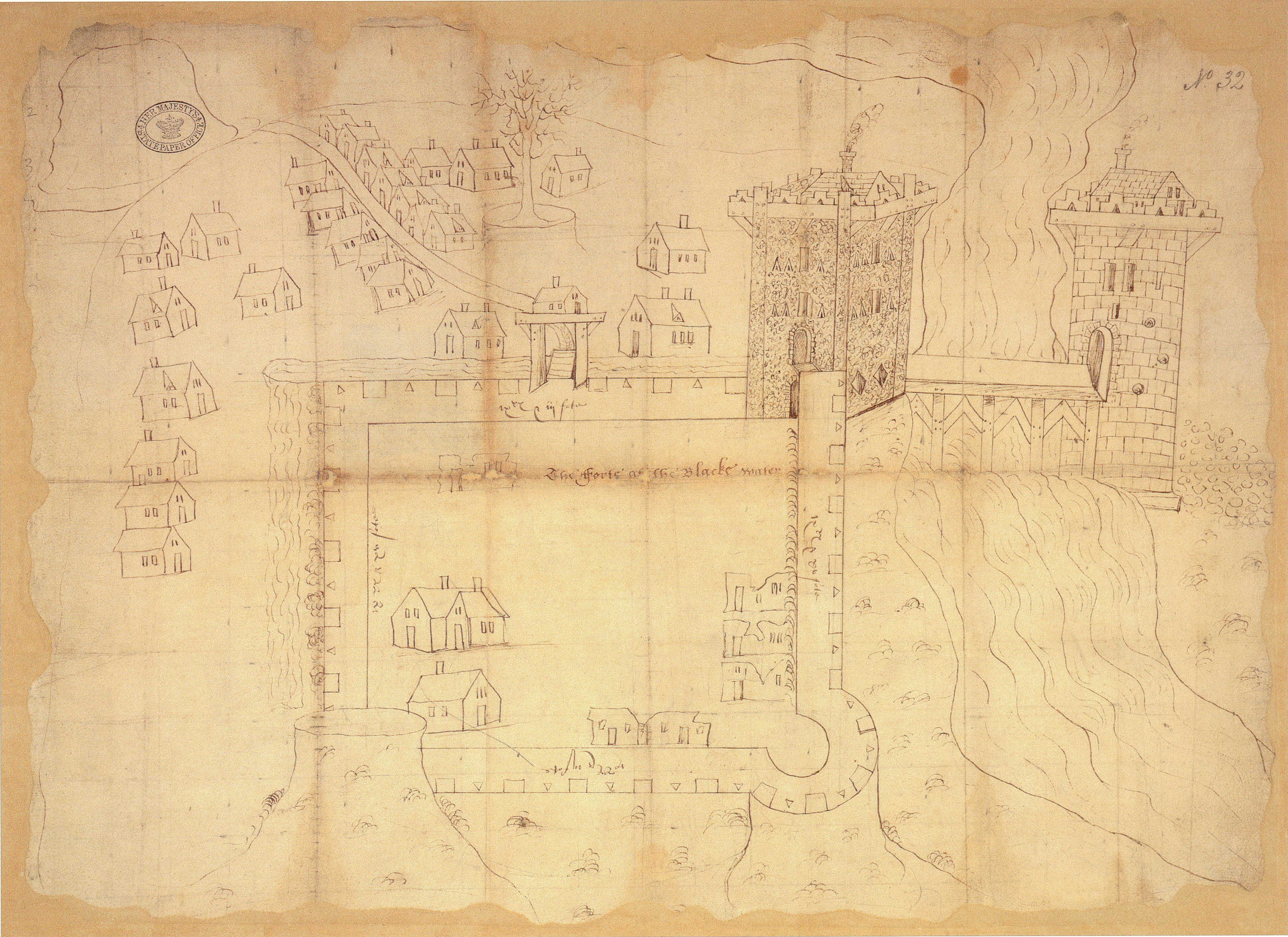
- The Blackwater Fort in a 1587 sketch
Date	16 February 1595
Location	Blackwatertown, County Armagh, Ireland 54.4126°N 6.7056°W
Result	Irish victory

Belligerents
Irish alliance	Kingdom of England

Commanders and leaders
Art MacBaron O'Neill	Edward Cornwall

Strength
~240	~26

Casualties and losses
23 killed (15 at fort, 8 more died of wounds)	Few

On 16 February 1595, a Gaelic Irish force assaulted and captured the English-held Blackwater Fort at Blackwatertown in County Armagh. The Irish were led by Art MacBaron O'Neill, brother of Hugh O'Neill, Earl of Tyrone, and marked Tyrone's break with the English Crown as he openly waged war against the English forces in Ireland.

== The Blackwater Fort ==
The assault focused on the English fort which sat at a bridge on the Blackwater River, marking the border between Counties Tyrone and Armagh. It was built on the orders of the 1st Earl of Essex in 1575 as an outpost of English military strength in the heart of Gaelic Ulster, but also to secure the power of the main Irish ally in the region, Hugh O'Neill, Baron of Dungannon. The fort was composed of a square earthwork bawn "twelve score yards in circuit" reinforced by two bulwarks and punctuated with gun loops in its ramparts. In one corner stood a wooden tower, four storeys tall, topped with a wooden walkway and a slate-covered building. It was accessed by two doors, one led out onto the ramparts, another led to a cellar. Each storey had defensive firing loops, also known as spike holes. This tower overlooked a road and bridge across the river. At the other side of the river, on the Tyrone side, was a stone tower. The stone tower controlled access to the bridge, as the road ran through it via large wooden doors.

== Background ==
Hugh O'Neill, lord of Tyrone, was thought an ally of the English Crown and he was supported by the English authorities in Dublin as a counterweight to the power of other native lords in Ulster, such as Sir Turlough Luineach O'Neill. However, encroachment by English authorities on the liberties of the native Irish lords in Ulster during the 1580s and early 1590s caused O'Neil to create an alliance of Irish lords, which looked to throw off English rule with the help of Philip II of Spain. From April 1593 O'Neill orchestrated a proxy war against the English using Hugh Maguire, Lord of Fermanagh, and Hugh Roe O'Donnell, Lord of Tyrconnell. They engaged the English in the west of Ulster while O'Neill, outwardly still loyal to the Crown, strengthened his power base in Ulster and subdued the Crown's Irish allies in the north. The Irish laid siege to Enniskillen Castle and defeated an English force sent to relieve it.

O'Neill's alliance was not limited to Ulster as he was allied to Fiach McHugh O'Byrne in Leinster. He had come under increasing pressure from Lord Deputy William Russell's military expeditions into the Wicklow Mountains. In desperation, Fiach McHugh asked that Tyrone offer help or at least raid the northern Pale to draw Russell out of Wicklow. O'Neill requested a meeting with Russell to discuss how to proceed but this was dismissed by the Lord Deputy as a ploy to draw him out of O'Byrne's lands. Therefore, to help O'Byrne, O'Neill made his first open move against the Crown.

== The Assault ==
On the morning of Sunday 16 February 1595, Art MacBaron O'Neill approached the fort from the direction of Armagh with 40 men, escorting what appeared to be two prisoners. As they crossed the bridge one of the English warders noticed the matchcords of the Irishmen's matchlock calivers were lit, a sign that they were ready to fire. The English opened fire and MacBaron's men forced their way into the stone tower, but the English withdrew to the upper storeys and prevented the Irish from taking the tower. Meanwhile, on the other side of the river, 200 Irish soldiers swept over the earth ramparts and took the bawn. The English soldiers and their families retreated to the wooden tower. Defensive fire from within kept the Irish back and twice the warders thwarted MacBaron's attempts to burn the position. Fifteen of MacBaron's men were killed attempting to storm the towers, and eight more would later die of their wounds. The stalemate lasted until five o' clock in the evening when MacBaron called for a ceasefire. He offered the garrison terms for their surrender. The English, led by Edward Cornwall, were critically low on ammunition but still prevaricated until MacBaron threatened to burn the fort to the ground with all in it. The ward's surrender was agreed and MacBaron guaranteed their safe passage to Newry.

== Results ==
The loss of the fort was doubtless a military setback for the Crown, but of more significance was the presence of the Earl of Tyrone in person. According to the English commander, O'Neill arrived after the surrender and was outraged at the losses suffered in taking the fort, and was angry that the defenders had not been executed. After the English soldiers and their families left, O'Neill looked on as the bridge was demolished and the fort's defence slighted. Up until this point there was no concrete proof that O'Neill was active in the attacks by Maguire and O'Donnell in the west of Ireland. Now there was indisputable proof that the crown was at war with O'Neill.

== Bibliography ==
- Marshall, John J. (1902). "To Rule the North: Being a History of the Fort of Blackwater in Ulster, Sometime Called Portmore". Ulster Journal of Archaeology. 8 (3): 107–118. ISSN 0082-7355. JSTOR 20566089.
- Morgan, Hiram (1993). Tyrone's Rebellion: The outbreak of the Nine Years' War in Tudor Ireland. London: The Boydell Press. ISBN 0-85115-683-5.
- O'Neill, James (2013). "The Cockpit of Ulster: War Along the River Blackwater 1593-1603". Ulster Journal of Archaeology. 72: 184–199. ISSN 0082-7355. JSTOR 44135444.
- O'Neill, James (2016). "The balloon goes up in Ulster: taking the Blackwater Fort". Ireland's Military Story: 53–56.
- O'Neill, James (2017). The Nine Years War, 1593-1603: O'Neill, Mountjoy and the Military Revolution. Dublin: Four Courts Press. ISBN 9781846827549.
