= Battle of the Ford of the Biscuits =

Battle in Fermanagh, Ireland during the Nine Years' War

- Part of the Nine Years' War
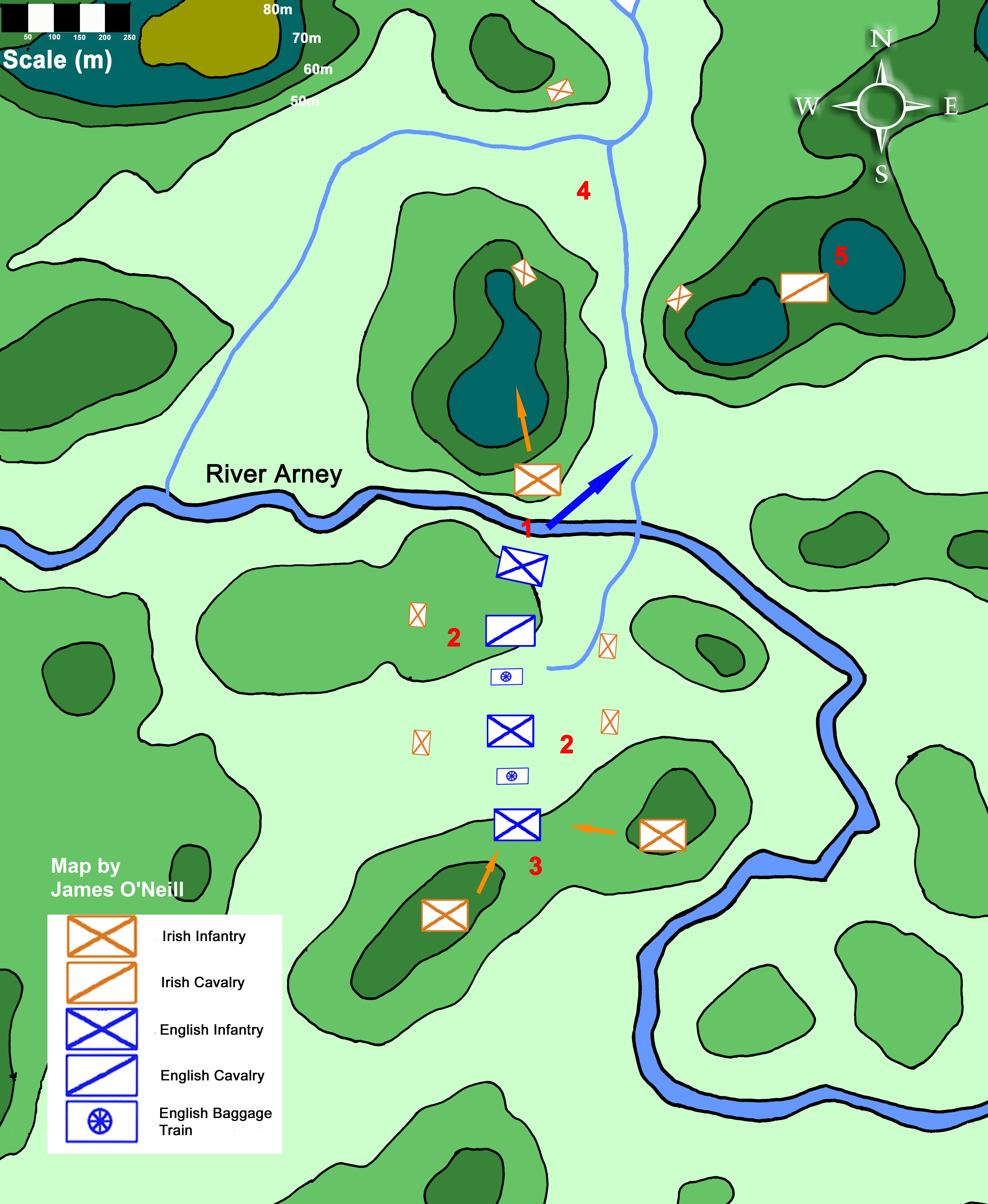
- The Battle of the Ford of the Biscuits, 7 Aug. 1594: 1: Irish shot engage and halt the head of the column but are eventually forced to give ground due to a determined English pike charge. 2: Irish shot force in the English loose shot and disorder the pikemen. 3: Irish pikemen and Scots charge into the disordered rear forcing it onto the main battle and then the van. 4: English army makes it to low ground. Under fire from the surrounding heights, the English attack south but are forced to cross further upstream. 5: Incongruously the Irish horse played no part in the battle
Date	7 August 1594
Location	Arney River, County Fermanagh, Ireland 54.277°N 7.639°W
Result	Irish victory

Belligerents
Kingdom of England	Irish alliance

Commanders and leaders
Sir Henry Duke; Sir Edward Herbert	Hugh Maguire; Cormac O'Neill

Strength
646	1,000+

Casualties and losses
56 killed 69 Wounded	Low

The Battle of the Ford of the Biscuits (Irish: Bel-atha-na-mBriosgadh) took place in Fermanagh, Ireland on 7 August 1594, during the Nine Years' War. A column of almost 650 English troops led by Sir Henry Duke was ambushed and defeated by a Gaelic Irish force under Hugh Maguire and Cormac MacBaron O'Neill at the Arney River. The English column had been sent to relieve and resupply Enniskillen Castle, which had been under siege by the Irish since May. The English suffered at least 56 killed and 69 wounded, and were forced to make a hasty retreat.

The battle gained its name because the supplies of the English, largely hard biscuits, were left scattered and floating in the river. The battle was an early engagement of the Nine Years' War, and exposed the vulnerability of the English to ambushes in the wilder parts of Ulster with its thick woods and bogs.

== Background ==
As part of the Tudor conquest of Ireland, a policy of surrender and regrant was introduced that involved the formal submission of the Gaelic lords to the Crown. The Gaelic territory of Fermanagh was shired as a county and elements of Irish Brehon Law were replaced by English law. Hugh Maguire, the Gaelic lord of Fermanagh, opposed the introduction of English law which reduced his overlordship over his weaker neighbours, and particularly the misdeeds of the local English sheriff, Captain Humphrey Willis.

In the summer of 1593, Maguire launched a revolt by raiding lands held by the English Lord President of Connaught, Richard Bingham. The English government sent a force under the Marshal of Ireland, Sir Henry Bagenal, to Fermanagh. The leading Gaelic lord of Ulster, Hugh O'Neill, Earl of Tyrone also led forces into the field, and alongside his estranged brother in law Bagenal defeated some of Maguire's forces at the Battle of Belleek in October 1593. Maguire's capital at Enniskillen was captured in February 1594 by an English force led by Captain John Dowdall, who massacred the Irish occupants after they had surrendered. Maguire then agreed to submit, and an agreement was brokered by Tyrone. However the peace did not last long and Maguire, Cormac MacBaron O'Neill (Tyrone's brother), and Red Hugh O'Donnell laid siege to Enniskillen in May 1594. An English relief force was sent to help the besieged garrison.

== Battle ==
The relief force was under the joint command of Sir Henry Duke and Sir Edward Herbert, and included experienced soldiers such as Captains Humphrey Willis, Henry Street, George Bingham, and John Dowdall (commander of the force that had taken Enniskillen in February). They had 600 infantry and 46 horsemen. Duke and Herbert believed this to be insufficient, and wrote to the Lord Deputy that "to go without a thousand men at the least or otherwise we shall dearly repent our going". No reinforcements were forthcoming, so the column set out from Cavan on 4 August. Burdened with supplies, the army was expected to take four days to march 29 miles north to Enniskillen.

The English infantry included pikemen as well as musketeers and caliver-men (together known as "shot"). When the Irish surrounding Enniskillen learned of the relief force, they moved to intercept it with c.1,000 men, which included horsemen, kern, and caliver-men. On the evening of 6 August, the English force made camp three miles south of a ford on the Arney River. That night the English camp was harried by Irish gunfire and incessant skirmishing meant the English troops were poorly rested when they set out on 7 August to relieve the beleaguered garrison.

As the thin column snaked its way north, it was harried on both sides by Irish kern armed with javelins. The ground was boggy near the Arney ford and so the English horsemen were forced to dismount. Thus, the infantry escorting the supply wagons for Enniskillen ran straight into the ambush. At around 11 o'clock, the head of the column reached the ford and without warning intense Irish gunfire tore into it from hidden positions on the opposite bank. With the advance stalled, Maguire and MacBaron attacked the rear of the column with the bulk of their forces. Wings of English shot deployed around the column to skirmish with the Irish, but withering Irish fire pushed them back to their pike stands in the column.

The rear body of English pikemen was raked by volleys of close-range gunfire, causing it to fall apart. The Irish pikemen and Scots mercenaries then charged the rear, forcing it to flee pell-mell onto the middle of the column. The English pikemen at the front of the column charged over the ford, pushing back the Irish shot, giving the English some room to reorder and regroup north of the river. The rest of the column hastily fled across the ford, abandoning their supplies.

The English came under Irish fire from the surrounding hills, and a counter-attack was stillborn when its leader Captain Fuller was killed by an Irish javelin. With most of the supplies abandoned at the river, Duke and Herbert decided their only option was to retreat. However, their retreat to the ford was met with renewed gunfire. The disintegrating army had to run along the river and cross at another ford an "arrow shot" upstream, casting aside their weapons and armour. Luckily for the English, they were not pursued as most of the Irish had fallen to looting the baggage train which gave the battle its name, Béal Átha na mBriosgadh or The Ford of the Biscuits.

The English commanders Duke and Herbert recorded 56 soldiers killed and 69 wounded.

== Aftermath ==
The badly-mauled Crown forces retreated westwards to Sligo.

A second relief expedition, led by the Lord Deputy of Ireland William Russell, managed to reach Enniskillen and re-supply it. However Enniskillen did fall to the Irish in May the following year and the garrison was massacred, despite having been promised their lives when they surrendered.

A number of factors, including the presence of his brother Cormac MacBaron O'Neill, have led some historians to conclude that Hugh O'Neill of Tyrone had encouraged Maguire to revolt a second time as a stalking horse for himself, hoping to prod the English administration into making more favorable concessions without formally taking up arms himself. Others have gone further to suggest that Maguire's rebellion was a diversion to focus English attention and military strength in Fermanagh while the Earl of Tyrone strengthened his position elsewhere in Ulster before breaking into open warfare at the start of 1595. This is yet more compelling when one considers that it was reported that many of the Irish shot deployed wore the distinctive red livery of the earl of Tyrone. Moreover, a report by a woman captured by the Irish (but later released) stated that the earl later met with Maguire at nearby Liscallaghan (modern-day Fivemiletown) to receive spoils from the battle. Six months later, Tyrone went into open rebellion, triggering the full outbreak of the Nine Years' War which lasted until the Treaty of Mellifont in 1603.

== Bibliography ==
- Falls, Cyril. Elizabeth's Irish Wars. Constable, 1996.
- Heath, Ian. The Irish Wars, 1485-1603. Osprey Publishing, 1993.
- Morgan, Hiram (1993). Tyrone's Rebellion: The outbreak of the Nine Years' War in Tudor Ireland. London: The Boydell Press. ISBN 0-85115-683-5.
- O'Neill, James and Logue, Paul. 'The Battle of the Ford of the Biscuits, 7 August 1594' in Claire Foley and Ronan McHugh (eds), An archaeological survey of County Fermanagh, vol. 1, pt. 2 (Belfast, 2014), pp 913–922.
- O'Neill, James. 'Death in the Lakelands: Tyrone’s proxy war, 1593-4', History Ireland, vol. 23, no. 2 (2015), pp 14–17.
- O'Neill, James (2017). The Nine Years War, 1593-1603: O'Neill, Mountjoy and the Military Revolution. Dublin: Four Courts Press. ISBN 9781846827549.
