= Hugh Maguire (Lord of Fermanagh) =

Irish nobleman and soldier (died 1600)

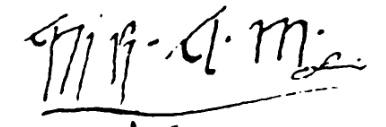
- Maguire's signature, 1593

Lord of Fermanagh
- Reign: 1589–1600
- Predecessor: Cúconnacht Maguire
- Successor: Cúconnacht Óg Maguire
- Born: Before 1570; Fermanagh, Ireland
- Died: February 1600; Near Carrigrohane, County Cork, Ireland
- Burial: Inniscarra, County Cork
- Consort: Margaret O'Neill (m. 1593)
- House: Maguire clan
- Father: Cúconnacht Óg Maguire
- Mother: Nuala O'Donnell
- Religion: Roman Catholicism

Sir Hugh Maguire (Irish: Aodh Mág Uidhir; died February 1600) (Note: Unless otherwise stated, dates in this article before 14 September 1752 are in the Julian calendar.) was an Irish lord and military commander, who was notably the first Gaelic chief to openly rebel against Elizabeth I's conquest of Ireland. He was a founding member of the confederacy of Irish lords which opposed English rule during the Nine Years' War (1593–1603).

Maguire secured the lordship of Fermanagh upon his father's death in 1589. In early 1593, Maguire revolted against the appointment of Humphrey Willis as Sheriff of Fermanagh, sparking the Nine Years' War. He joined prominent Ulster lords Hugh Roe O'Donnell and Hugh O'Neill, Earl of Tyrone, in seeking military assistance from Spain. Subsequent conflicts, which included the Battle of Belleek and the Battle of the Ford of the Biscuits, were among the first of the Nine Years' War. Maguire held command at the Battle of the Yellow Ford, which resulted in a crucial confederate victory. In 1600, he was fatally shot by English officer Warham St Leger in a skirmish near Carrigrohane.

== Family background ==
Hugh Maguire was born sometime before 1570, (Note: His younger half-brother Cúconnacht Óg was born c. 1570.) the eldest son of Cúconnacht Maguire, chief of the Maguire clan from 1566 to 1589, and Nuala O'Donnell, daughter of Manus O'Donnell. He had two younger half-brothers, Brian and Cúconnacht Óg, and a brother, Shane. Arthur O'Neill and Brian Oge O'Rourke were reported on separate occasions to have married a sister of Maguire. The Maguire clan's kingdom, Fermanagh, was in southern Ulster—a terrain of difficult access considered impregnable.

== Early career ==
As a young man, Maguire had repeated run-ins with the English-led Irish government. In 1586, he surrendered to the government and paid 500 beeves for a pardon, of which 200 were appropriated by Lord Deputy John Perrot as his perquisite to make Maguire a captain. This was not carried through, even though Maguire had lodged three pledges for his loyalty in Dublin Castle.

In 1587, Maguire, along with Arthur O'Neill's forces, attacked and plundered a party of Scots who had raided County Down. On their return towards the River Erne, Maguire killed and wounded many of O'Neill's men. He joined Irish lord Brian O'Rourke and the Bourke family in assisting survivors of the Spanish Armada who had shipwrecked on the coast of Ireland in 1588. Maguire was also implicated in a plot arranged by Hugh O'Neill, Earl of Tyrone, to murder Tyrone's rival Conn MacShane O'Neill.

Maguire's father Cúconnacht died in June 1589. Although Maguire was his father's tanist (designated heir), his succession was challenged by rival branches of the family, who nominated Connor Roe Maguire (grandson of a former chief) as their lord. However, Hugh Maguire's claim prevailed because he received support from Donnell O'Donnell of the powerful O'Donnell clan of the neighbouring kingdom Tyrconnell. Maguire was formally inaugurated by O'Donnell in 1589.

He also had support from the Privy Council of Ireland, who had maintained a friendly relationship with Cúconnacht and hoped to do the same with his son. The government's recognition of Maguire's succession was confirmed in 1591 when he was knighted at Christ Church Cathedral in Dublin.

== Revolt ==
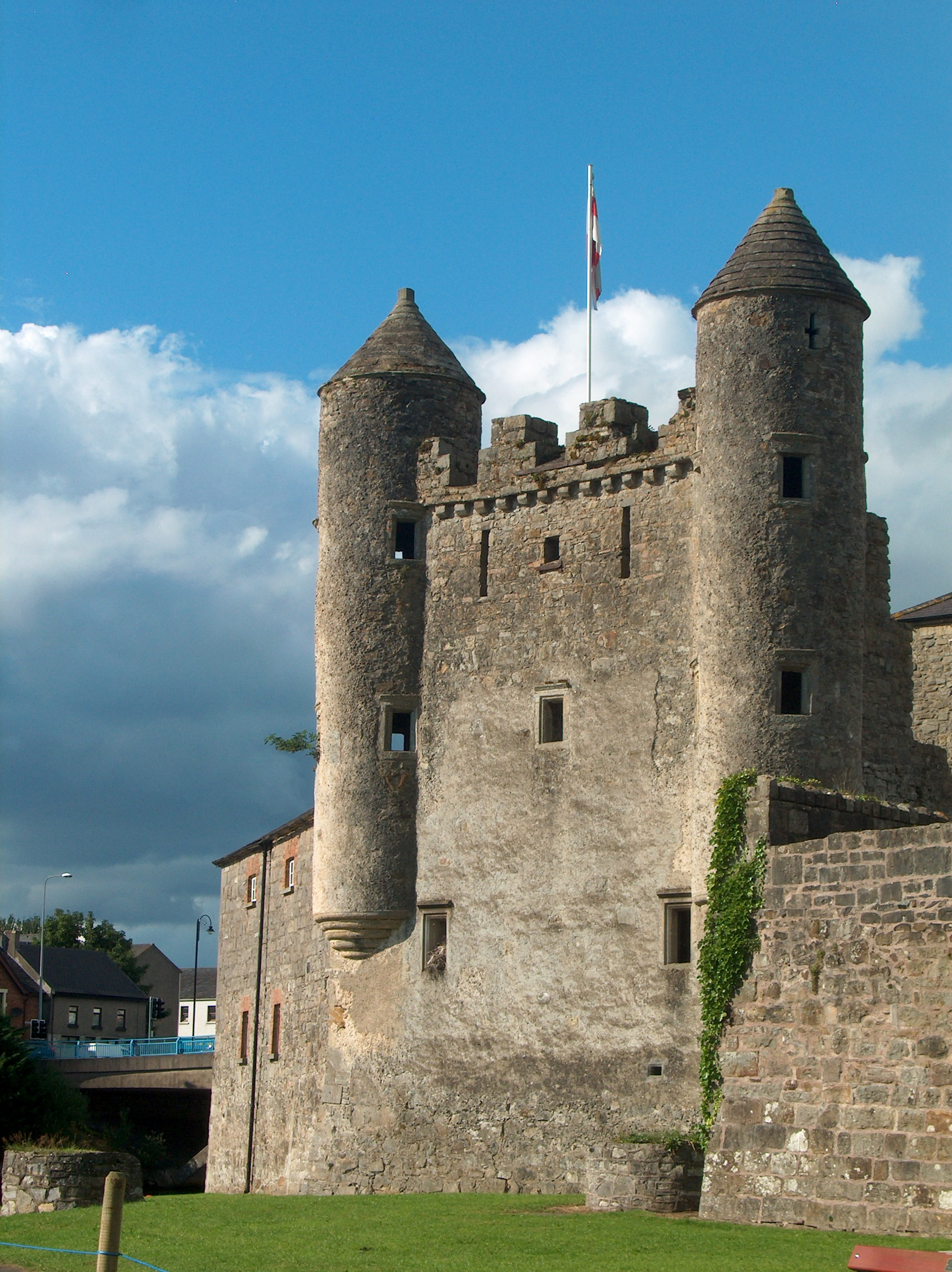
The Irish confederacy was formed in Enniskillen Castle, one of Maguire's strongholds.

Within Maguire's first years as clan chief, he was confronted by the threat of government intrusion on Fermanagh's independence. The lord of Monaghan, a neighbouring Gaelic kingdom, had also died in 1589, and by 1590, his successor Hugh Roe MacMahon was hanged on Lord Deputy William FitzWilliam's orders (in what has been described as judicial murder) and Monaghan was partitioned and allotted to English servitors. Since 1585, Richard Bingham, Lord President of Connaught, gradually extended his control over the region by establishing garrisons and appointing local officials. Maguire later stated that his rebellion was not "in respect of any combinations with any foreign enemy or of any malice towards Her Majesty but through the occasion of his hard usage" from Bingham's regime. (Note: The Irish council dismissed these allegations as "frivolous", but subsequently FitzWilliam stopped Richard Bingham from retaliating against Maguire's attacks against Roscommon.)

Maguire travelled to Dublin in summer 1590 and met with FitzWilliam. They discussed the appointment of a sheriff who would govern Fermanagh on behalf of the Crown, but Maguire was only willing to accept a sheriff "chosen of his own name". In October 1591, he bribed FitzWilliam and Henry Bagenal (Marshal of the Irish Army) with 300 beeves to postpone this appointment.

The execution of Brian O'Rourke in November 1591 created further discontent in the Gaelic nobility. Maguire offered protection to his son Brian Oge O'Rourke, who subsequently married Maguire's sister. Maguire secretly committed treasonous actions against the government. In 1592, he provided refuge and transportation for Hugh Roe O'Donnell, son of the O'Donnell clan chief, who had recently escaped imprisonment in Dublin Castle. In O'Donnell's absence, Tyrconnell had been heavily pillaged by English soldier Humphrey Willis, who had been appointed Sheriff of Tyrconnell. One of O'Donnell's first actions upon returning home was to expel Willis.

Maguire learnt that FitzWilliam would be appointing Willis as Sheriff of Fermanagh. He argued in vain that he had already bribed FitzWilliam with 300 cows and retorted to FitzWilliam that "your sheriff shall be welcome but let me know his eric [price of compensation for his death] that if my people should cut his head off I may levy it upon the country". Willis was nevertheless appointed to the post, and in early April 1593, he entered Fermanagh with at least 100 men and began pillaging the kingdom. Maguire claimed that Willis's men "killed one of the best gents in the country named the son of Edmund Mac Hugh Maguire whose head they cut off they hurled it from place to place as a football". Willis's marauding was not justified by authorities in Dublin. The historian Hiram Morgan stated this was a blatant move to weaken the Earl of Tyrone's power by subjugating Maguire.

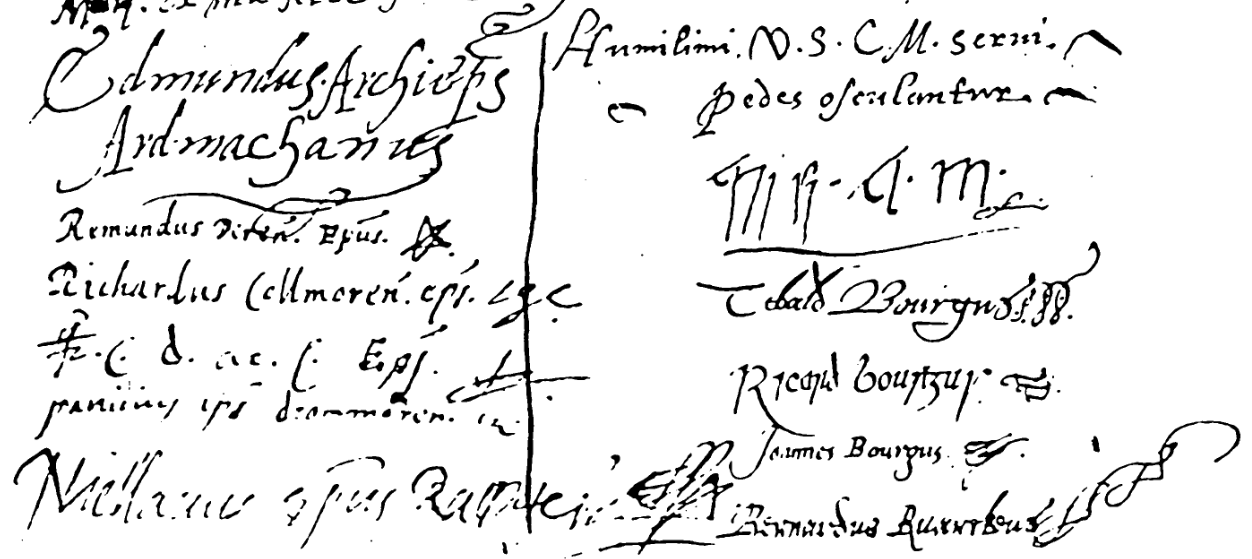
Signatures of the founding members of the Irish confederacy. Right column, top to bottom: Maguire, Theobald Bourke, Richard Bourke, John Bourke, Brian Oge O'Rourke.

It was after Willis' first offensive that Maguire, O'Donnell, Brian Oge O'Rourke and Theobald, Richard and John Bourke met in Enniskillen Castle on 28 April [N.S. 8 May] 1593. The noblemen were assembled by Edmund MacGauran, a Catholic Archbishop recently returned from Spain with promises that Philip II of Spain would support oppressed Irish Catholics if they proved themselves by launching prior military action. The noblemen signed a letter addressed to Philip II of Spain requesting urgent reinforcements from the Spanish army. This letter was delivered to the Spanish court.

Initially Maguire was not in a position to militarily oppose Willis. However, with support from the confederacy, spearheaded by O'Donnell and Tyrone, Maguire was able to gain reinforcements of 100 men led by Tyrone's brother Cormac MacBaron O'Neill, and 120 men under the commands of Tyrone's foster-brothers Donnall and Donough O'Hagan. Willis and his men took refuge in a church for six to seven days. (Note: Driving Willis and his men into a church was the same technique Hugh Roe O'Donnell used to expel Willis from Tyrconnell in 1592.) Tyrone (who publicly presented as a loyalist) intervened and negotiated their safe conduct out of Fermanagh. Maguire used the opportunity to push them into the lands of his rival Connor Roe Maguire.

Maguire was the first Gaelic chief to openly rebel against the Tudor conquest of Ireland under the reign of English monarch Elizabeth I. The Dublin Castle administration considered Maguire's response to be extreme. By the end of May, he was openly at war with the Crown. Maguire's revolt was later recognised as the opening strike of the Nine Years' War (1593–1603).

== Nine Years' War ==
=== Raids across Connacht ===
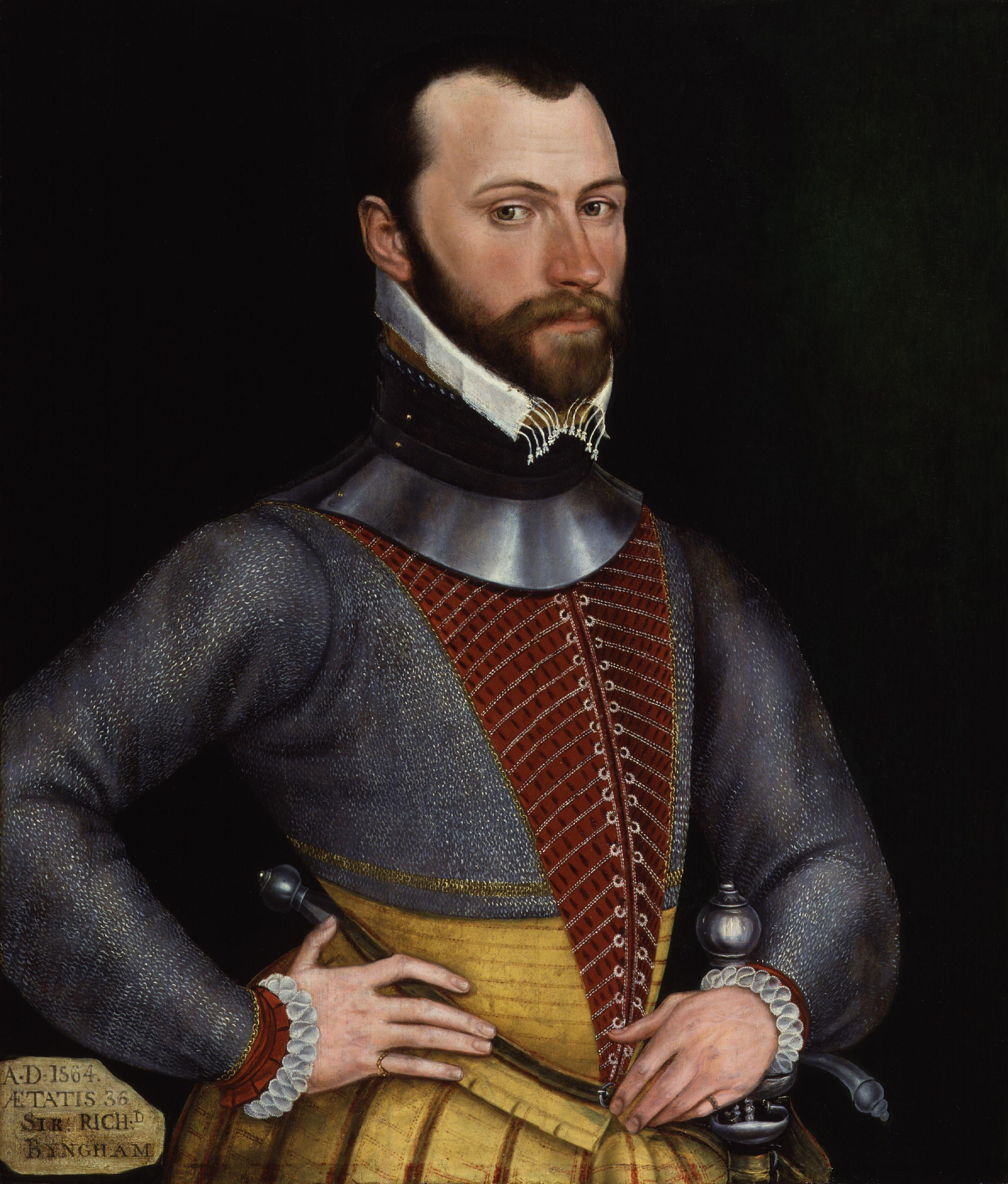
Richard Bingham, Lord President of Connacht, faced attacks from Maguire.

In late May, Maguire and his brother Shane invaded Sligo with about 1,100 men. He raided Ballymote, where Bingham's brother George Bingham was based. Around 7,000 to 8,000 cattle were stolen; the Annals of the Four Masters noted that "there was not much of that country which he did not plunder... also burned on that day thirteen villages on every side". Maguire's forces burned the town whilst the population sought shelter under the walls of Ballymote Castle. O'Rourke and the O'Hagan brothers also accompanied Maguire's forces in their expeditions into Connacht.

On 23 June, Maguire led 120 horse and 1,000 footmen along Lough Allen to raid Tulsk, County Roscommon, where Richard Bingham was then encamped. The dense fog blinded Maguire and Bingham's forces to each other's positions. Royal soldiers suddenly found themselves close to the Irish cavalry and withdrew, losing many men. Bingham countercharged but quickly retreated when faced with Maguire's infantry. Maguire retired into Fermanagh with considerable spoil, but the death of MacGauran, who was killed while riding with Maguire, was a significant loss to the confederacy.

O'Donnell and Tyrone hid their involvement in the confederacy from the government, but Bingham suspected that Maguire was acting with their support. O'Donnell aided the growing rebellion by sending MacSweeney gallowglass to Maguire and O'Rourke. O'Donnell also advised Maguire and sheltered his creaghts (herds of livestock) on Tyrconnell's borders.

In summer 1593, the Irish Privy Council appointed Tyrone as commissioner to establish a peace settlement with Maguire. The government requested Maguire to disperse his forces. Negotiations stalled due to Maguire's demands that the Binghams should have no authority in Fermanagh. Maguire made excuses to not visit FitzWilliam in Dublin. In early September, Maguire invaded Monaghan and Farney, raiding as far as Castle Ring. On the return journey he unsuccessfully attempted to take a garrison in a Monaghan abbey. After his expedition into Monaghan, Maguire was proclaimed a traitor.

=== Battle of Belleek ===
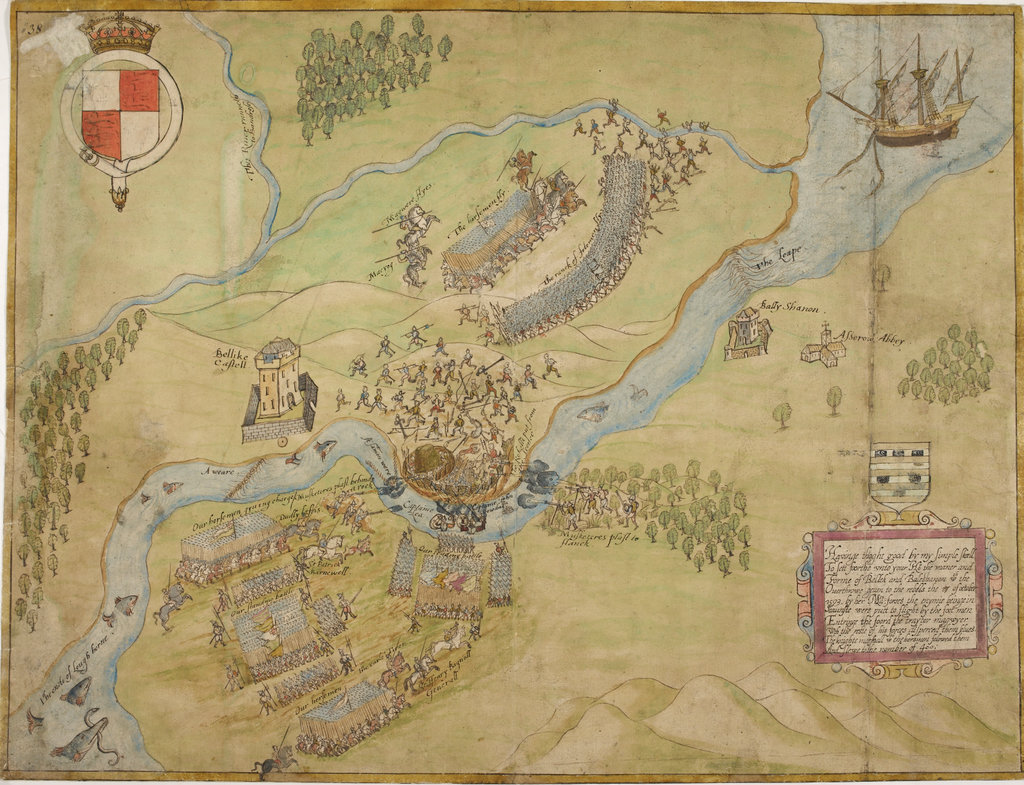
1594 drawing of the Battle of Belleek by John Thomas

Maguire's rebellious activity provoked a large-scale military expedition led by Henry Bagenal, Marshal of the royal Irish army. Tyrone agreed to assist Bagenal to deflect allegations that he was supporting Maguire. Bagenal entered Fermanagh on 22 September with 144 cavalry, 763 foot soldiers and 118 kern, devastating the northern shore of Lough Erne. Two days later, his force arrived at Enniskillen to find Maguire was burning the town around the castle to prevent Bagenal from commandeering it. Maguire controlled Enniskillen Castle and Lisgoole Abbey, preventing the royal force from crossing the Erne. Tyrone joined Bagenal at Enniskillen, and on 7 October, they marched separately to the ford near Belleek.

Tyrone allegedly advised Maguire prior to the Battle of Belleek, and they planned to lose the battle to make Maguire's raids seem inconsequential and to maintain Tyrone's loyalist image. On 10 October, Bagenal and Tyrone's combined forces approached the crossing near Belleek. Maguire had fortified the crossing with gallowglass, redshanks and a unit of firearm infantry, amounting to about 600 to 900 men. The royal musketeers, armed with long-range firearms, easily assailed Maguire's men and poured fire into their flanks. When a royal infantry assault, led by Captains Thomas Lee and John Dowdall, crossed the ford, the Irish force retreated. It was estimated that 300 Irish soldiers were killed; in comparison, only 3 royal soldiers were killed. Maguire was wounded in the battle, and FitzWilliam and Bagenal assumed that the revolt had been stopped. Tyrone was speared in the leg; the wound served as physical proof of his loyalty to the government. Bagenal was suspicious and later received intelligence that Tyrone had advised Maguire.

=== Enniskillen Castle ===
Conflict between Maguire and royal forces continued. Dowdall, who remained in Fermanagh with 300 men, raided along Lough Erne. His men ambushed Maguire's boats on 20 November. On 18 January 1594, Maguire was almost captured when he mistook English troops for his own. A premature shot alerted him and he escaped, though two of his companions were killed.

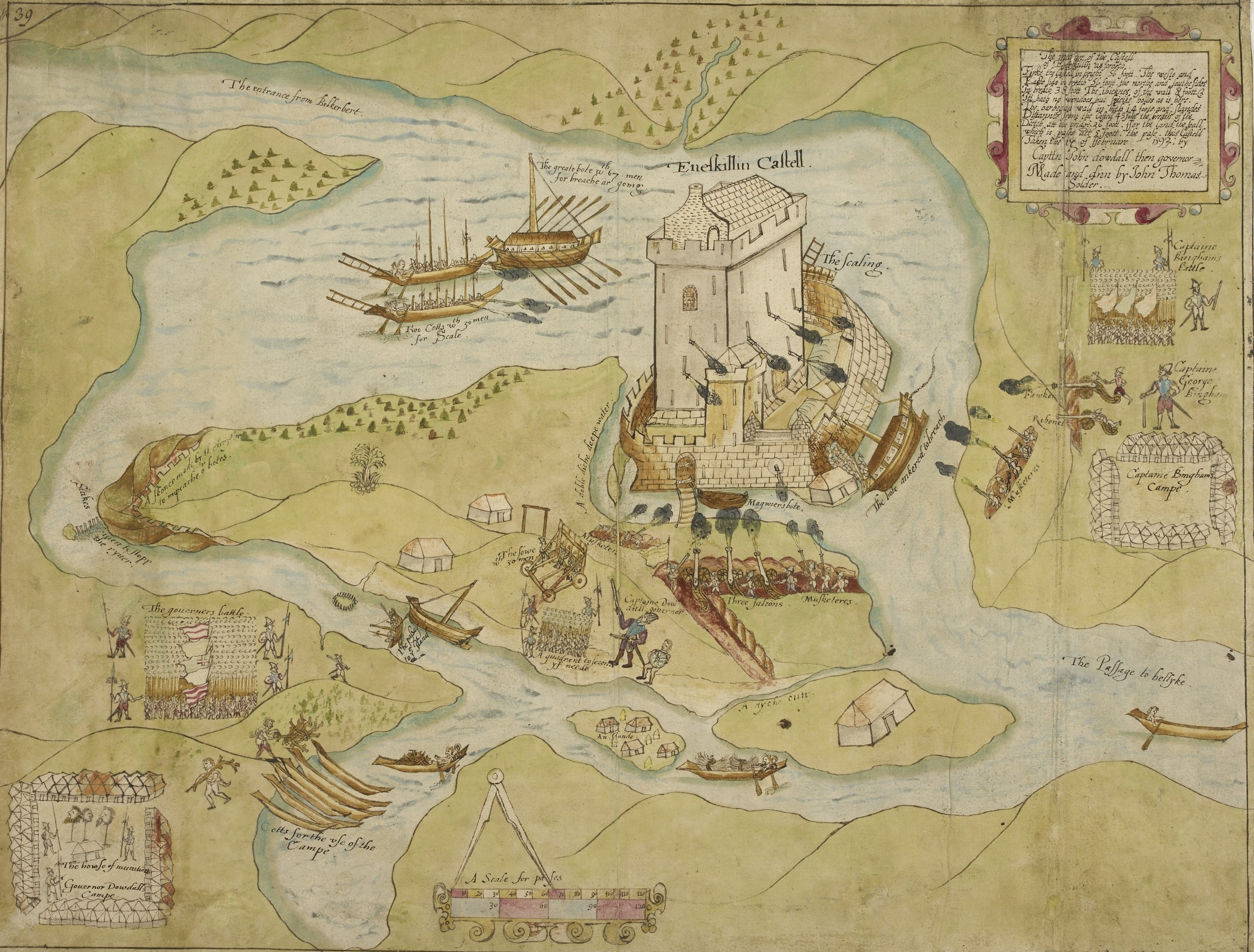
Contemporaneous map of the Siege of Enniskillen in 1594

Dowdall's forces were confined to north of the lough as Maguire retained control over Enniskillen. Dowdall's men established positions around the castle on 25 January, and they launched a successful siege on 2 February. Most, if not all of Maguire's men, were executed. It appeared to some that Maguire's revolt was declining, as Dowdall reported that Maguire only had 7 cavalry and 20 infantry left. O'Donnell rushed to Maguire's aid to retake the castle, which signalled to the government his status as a confederate commander. Their forces blockaded the castle by 11 June, and by late July the royal soldiers were suffering from food shortages. On 7 August, a royal column sent to relieve the castle was driven back by Maguire at the Arney River—it became known as the "Ford of the Biscuits". Soon after, Enniskillen was relieved by Lord Deputy William Russell. It remained Fermanagh's sole government outpost.

In January 1595, Maguire and other Irish lords were invited to submit their grievances to the government. The Queen stated that she was unaware of their poor treatment by officials, and they would be compensated if their complaints were found to be true. In April, Maguire and fellow Ulster lords submitted before government commissioners in Dundalk's market place. It seemed that peace was imminent, though this was misdirection as Tyrone was holding out for an impending Spanish expedition. In May 1595, Maguire regained Enniskillen with military assistance from Cormac MacBaron.

=== Later campaigns ===
Maguire participated in the Battle of Clontibret in 1595, a significant early defeat for the English, and commanded the cavalry at Mullaghbrack in 1596. He sent in his submission to the government later in the year.

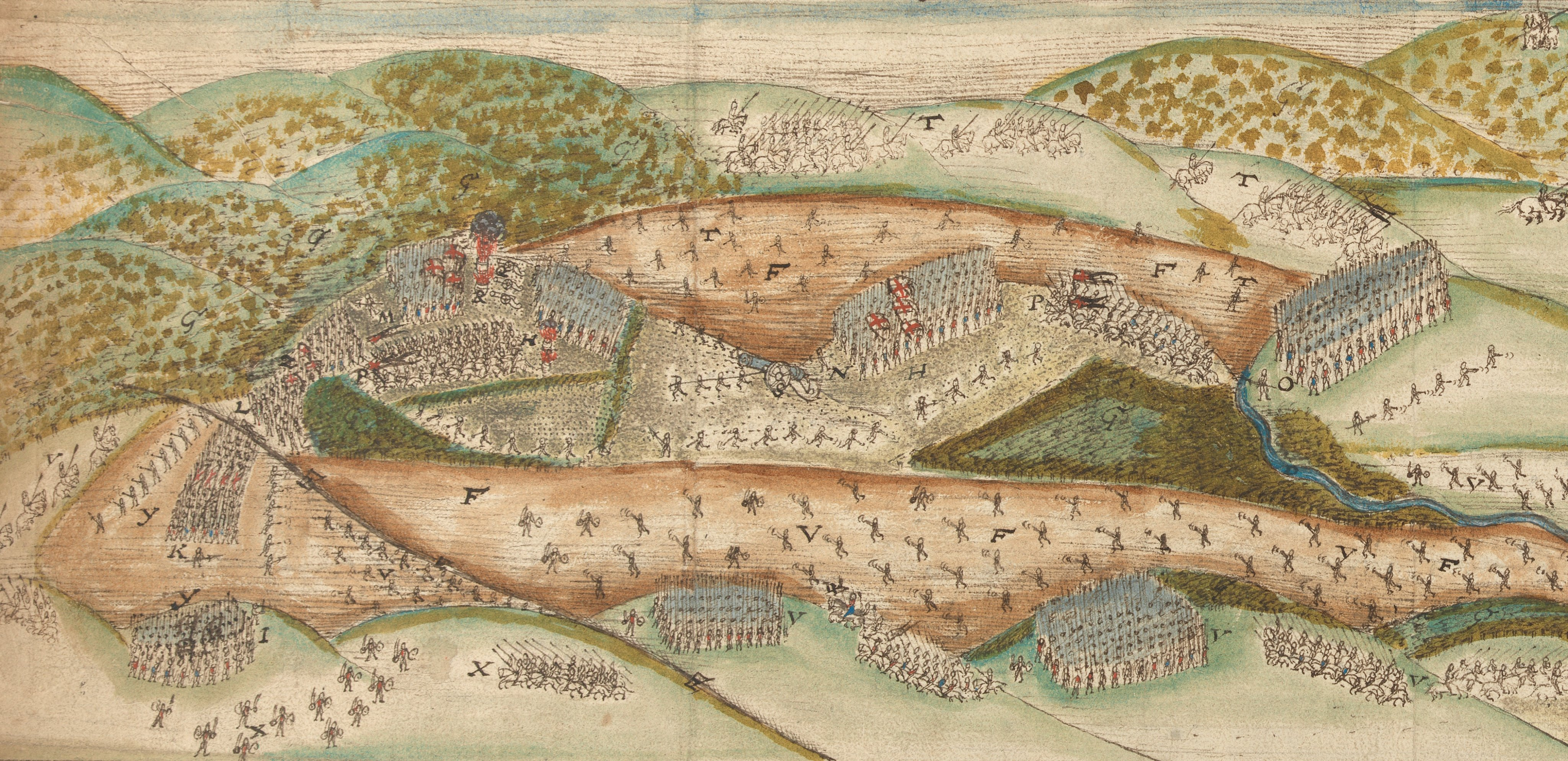
The Battle of the Yellow Ford was the greatest confederate victory during the Nine Years' War.

When the truce expired in June, Tyrone resumed hostilities by besieging the Blackwater Fort. Bagenal, motivated by his animosity towards Tyrone, advocated to lead an army to relieve the fort. On 14 August 1598, whilst crossing the River Callan, Bagenal's army was attacked by the combined forces of Tyrone, O'Donnell and Maguire in the Battle of the Yellow Ford. The confederates had prepared ditches in the ground to obstruct the enemy. Half of Bagenal's 4,000 men were killed, including Bagenal himself. The confederacy's success at the battle was the greatest victory by Irish forces against England, and it sparked a general revolt throughout the country, particularly in Munster. In 1599, Maguire helped raid Thomond and took Inchiquin Castle in County Clare.

Maguire was one of six confederate witnesses present at a conference between Tyrone and Lord Deputy Robert Devereux, 2nd Earl of Essex, on 7 September 1599. Warham St Leger, (Note: St Leger is not to be confused with his uncle, also named Warham St Leger (c. 1525–1597).) the governor of Laois, who killed Maguire six months later, was also present as a witness.

In late 1599, Maguire accompanied Tyrone on the latter's pilgrimage to Holycross in Munster. Tyrone was striving to win over Ireland's English-speaking Catholic population (the "Old English") in what has been described as a "Faith and Fatherland" campaign.

In early 1600, Maguire commanded Tyrone's cavalry in the Leinster and Munster campaigns.

== Death ==
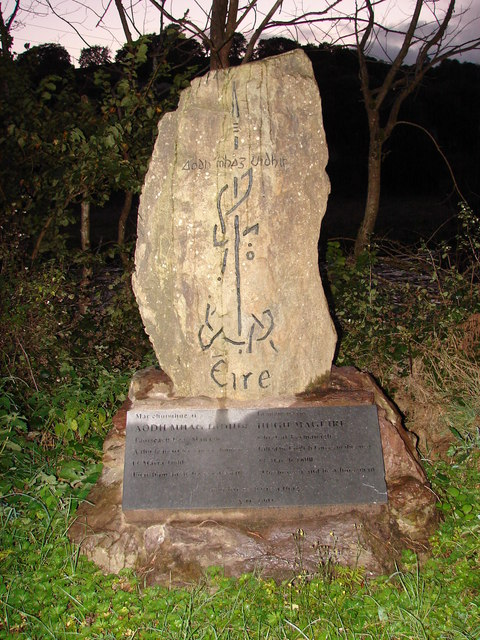
A memorial to commemorate Maguire's death was erected at Inniscarra Cemetery in 2001.

In February 1600, (Note: Sources agree that Hugh Maguire and Wareham St Leger died in early 1600, but differ on the exact date of their deaths. An entry in the Calendar of the Carew manuscripts dated 5 March states that St Leger died on the Saturday after "Tuesday last". This would be 1 March (N.S. 11 March) 1600. According to 17th-century historian Philip O'Sullivan Beare, St Leger "was reduced to madness by the effects of his wound, died in fifteen days [after the skirmish]." St Leger's and Maguire's 19th-century entries in the Dictionary of National Biography claim they both died on 18 February, though Tyrone's 1895 entry claims that Maguire died on 1 March. Maguire's 2001 monument in Garravagh claims 11 March. Maguire's 2004 entry in the Oxford Dictionary of National Biography states he died on 18 February. Maguire's 2009 entry in the Dictionary of Irish Biography claims 4 March. St Leger's 2009 entry states that he died on 4 or 5 March, "some four days after" the skirmish.) Maguire and a small party were conducting reconnaissance (or perhaps raiding) near Carrigrohane, about three miles west of Cork city. The party were intercepted by British officers Warham St Leger and Henry Power, chief commissioner of Munster. In the ensuing skirmish, (Note: The 19th-century historian Alfred Webb stated that Maguire's "small party" was intercepted by St Leger and Power's "superior force". However, historian Terry Clavin stated that St Leger and Power had "about forty to fifty men on horses", and Maguire's "body of mounted rebels [were] about the same number". According to Henry Power, Maguire's "foster-father, his priest, all the commanders of his regiment" were killed in the skirmish. According to Pacata Hibernia, "none else on either side was slain".) Maguire and St Leger charged their horses at each other. St Leger shot Maguire with a double-bulleted petronel, but Maguire survived long enough to thrust his lance through St Leger's helmet and into his skull, with such force that the steel tip broke off his lance. St Leger was taken back to Cork, where he died on 1 March [N.S. 11 March ] 1600.

Accompanied by his priest and two horsemen, Maguire escaped into the growing darkness of the evening, but after a mile he fell from his horse and died from his gunshot wounds—"under a bush" according to the bishop of Cork. Maguire's body was buried in an unknown plot around Inniscarra, with full military honours. Maguire's death spurred Tyrone to abruptly end his Munster campaign and return to Ulster.

== Personal life ==
On 17 May 1593, FitzWilliam reported that Maguire was to marry Tyrone's daughter Margaret O'Neill. Their marriage occurred shortly after the report. This marriage established a formal alliance between the Maguire clan and the O'Neill clan. Maguire and his wife were related, as Maguire and Tyrone were first cousins. (Note: Maguire's father Cúconnacht and Tyrone's mother Siobhán were siblings.)

Maguire had at least three children: Seaan Ruadh, Aodh and Eamonn. Maguire's eldest son (possibly Seaan Ruadh) was killed in the same skirmish as his father. The historian Paul Walsh stated that this son could not have been a child of Margaret O'Neill. In 1607, a child of Maguire and Margaret was referenced by the Earl of Clanricarde. English politician Arthur Chichester spoke of Maguire and Margaret's son in 1610. In October 1612, during the Plantation of Ulster, Maguire's widow Margaret was given a legal grant to rent out land in County Fermanagh and County Cavan.

== Legacy ==
Following Maguire's death, the lordship of Fermanagh was contested by two rival claimants: Connor Roe Maguire and Cúconnacht Óg Maguire. At a banquet at Tyrone's house in Dungannon, with both claimants present, Hugh Roe O'Donnell proclaimed Cúconnacht Óg as Hugh Maguire's successor. Tyrone preferred Connor Roe, and though the decision was reluctantly accepted, O'Donnell's fait accompli led to increased tension in the confederacy. Cúconnacht Óg accompanied Tyrone in the Flight of the Earls in 1607, and died in Genoa in August 1608.

A monument commemorating Maguire was erected at Inniscarra Cemetery, near Cork, on 29 April 2001.

=== Literature ===
Eochaidh Ó hÉoghusa (c. 1568 – 1612), a bardic poet and confidant of the Maguire clan, composed an Irish-language ode upon Maguire's death. It was later translated into English by James Clarence Mangan. An extract reads:

Hugh marched forth to fight—I grieved to see him so depart;
A lo! to-night he wanders frozen, rain-drenched, sad, betrayed—
But the memory of the lime-white mansions his right hand hath laid
In ashes, warms the hero's heart!

The Annals of the Four Masters (c. 1630) describes the Irish reaction to Maguire's death:

The death of Maguire caused a giddiness of spirits, and depression of mind, in O'Neill and the Irish chiefs in general; and this was no wonder, for he was the bulwark of valour and prowess, the shield of protection and shelter, the tower of support and defence, and the pillar of the hospitality and achievements of the Oirghialla, and of almost all the Irish of his time.

In his 1861 poem Eirinn a' Gul ("Ireland Weeping"), Scottish Gaelic poet William Livingston laments the loss of Irish clan chiefs like Maguire, Tyrone and O'Donnell. An extract from an English translation reads:

Where is the heroism of the three Hughs, heroic O’Donell and O’Neill, and MacGuidhir hurling himself without hesitation upon the foe and standing to death before he yielded?
