= Battle of Belleek =

Battle of the Nine Years' War, 1593

- Part of the Nine Years' War
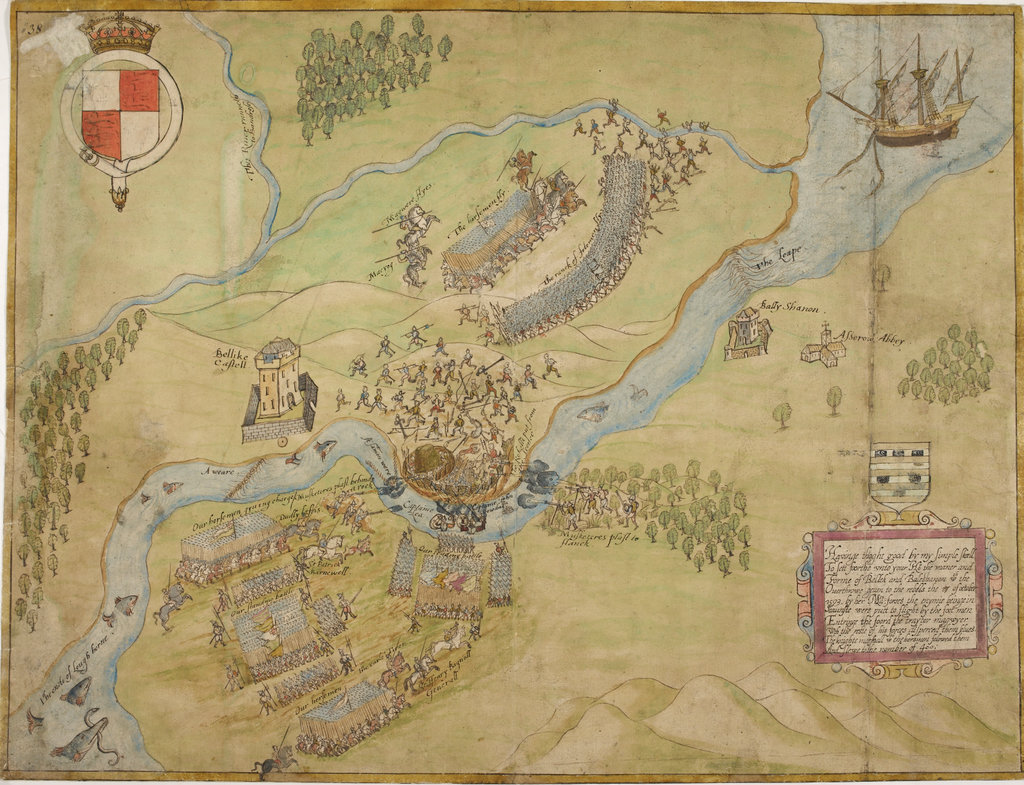
- 1594 illustration by John Thomas
Date	10 October 1593
Location	River Erne near Belleek, County Fermanagh 54.4812°N 8.0961°W
Result	English victory

Belligerents
Irish alliance	England

Commanders and leaders
Hugh Maguire	Sir Henry Bagenal; Earl of Tyrone

Strength
~600–900	~1,200

Casualties and losses
~300	~Few, possibly 3 killed, 6 wounded

The Battle of Belleek, also known as the Battle of the Erne Fords, was fought on the River Erne near Belleek in Fermanagh, Ireland, on 10 October 1593. It was part of the buildup to the Nine Years' War. The battle was fought between a Gaelic Irish army under Hugh Maguire, lord of Fermanagh—who had begun a revolt against the English—and an English Crown expeditionary force under Sir Henry Bagenal, supported by Hugh O'Neill, Earl of Tyrone. Maguire's force was defeated, but the bulk of his army was unscathed. Hugh O'Neill would later join Maguire in war against the English.

== Background ==
Hugh Maguire, lord of Fermanagh, had broken out into open warfare against the Crown in Spring 1593. He had been provoked by the misdeeds of the English sheriff, Humphrey Willis. Initially, Maguire did not have sufficient forces to oppose Willis, but reinforcements out of Tyrone, led by Cormac MacBaron O'Neill and shot under the O'Hagans enabled Maguire to take the offensive. During May and June 1593, Maguire and Brian Oge O'Rourke of West Breifne raided lands held by the English Lord President of Connaught, Richard Bingham. They destroyed the town around Ballymote Castle. Negotiations produced little results, and Sir Henry Bagenal was commissioned to lead a force into Fermanagh and bring Maguire to heel. On his march into Fermanagh, Bagenal attacked the lands of Maguire's ally, Brian MacHugh Og MacMahon in County Monaghan. Bagenal entered Fermanagh on 22 September leading 144 horsemen, 763 foot soldiers, and 118 kern. Hugh O'Neill, lord of Tyrone, met Bagenal near Enniskillen Castle on 26 September with 200 horsemen and 600 foot soldiers – half the number of promised infantry. Maguire held Enniskillen Castle and blocked the ford across the Erne at Lisgoole Abbey with troops holding strong fortifications. Bagenal proposed several plans to flank Maguire's defences, but O'Neill refused to cooperate. Therefore, unable to cross the Erne, Bagenal and O'Neill marched north in separate columns on 7 October, meeting at Termon Magrath two days later. O'Neill had ordered his infantry to return home. Maguire's mixed force of 600–900 gallowglass, redshanks, and shot held earthwork defences on the ford near Belleek. The ford was known as Áth Cúil Uain.

== Battle ==
The combined forces of Bagenal and O'Neill moved on Maguire's positions on 10 October. Though Maguire was in overall command of Irish forces in the region he was not in immediate command at the ford. Bagenal described the ford as "fortified in front and flank for their own defence, and our annoyance, in the best sort they could devise". The Crown army was split into two battalia of infantry while sleeves of loose shot armed with muskets were sent to positions on the left and right of the ford. The longer range of the muskets over-matched the smaller calivers of the Irish defenders. Therefore, the English could pour fire into the Irish without fear of effective return fire. The assaulting infantry entered the water, which was high, and the soldiers were described as "wading through to the arm holes". Several ineffective volleys from the defending Irish did little to slow the advance. Moreover, the ford was found to be wide enough to accommodate a simultaneous crossing by the horse. As the English neared the far bank the Irish defenders began to withdraw from the position, initially orderly and in troops, but when the Crown horse made good their crossing they quickly put the defenders to flight. The horse, most provided by O'Neill, pursued them, killing many without resistance. During the melee O'Neill was speared in the leg, while Bagenal's shin was bruised by the flat of a gallowglass axe. It was estimated that 300 of Maguire's men were killed, mostly Clan Sweeney gallowglass and Scottish redshanks.

== Aftermath ==
O'Neill returned to Dungannon to receive treatment for his wound, whereas Bagenal continued to plunder in the area until he returned to Lisgoole on 17 October. Bagenal believed Maguire's forces had been dealt a severe blow and Lord Deputy William Fitzwilliam was sure that Maguire's power was broken and his forces dwindling. Yet it later emerged that Maguire's main force of modern pike and shot, which had raided Connacht earlier in the year and blocked Bagenal at Lisgoole Abbey, was unscathed. There was some squabbling between O'Neill and Bagenal over credit for the action (O'Neill was still outwardly loyal to the crown), but Tyrone was working on both sides, and directing a proxy war against the Crown in the west of Ulster while he strengthened his power in mid- and east-Ulster. When Hugh Roe O'Donnell of Tyrconnell offered to reinforce the position at Belleek, O'Neill ordered him to stand down. Though painful, O'Neill's wound helped confirm his 'loyalty' and increased the effectiveness of the deception as he "was pleased therat, so that the English should not have any suspicion of him". The bloodletting at Belleek was an effective deception to distract the Crown into thinking a small regional revolt was nearly over, when in truth the English were in the early stages of a war which almost ended English power in Ireland.

== Bibliography ==
- Hiram Morgan, Tyrone's Rebellion: The outbreak of the Nine Years war in Tudor Ireland (Dublin, 1993).
- Lughaidh Ó Clérigh, The life of Aodh Ruadh O’ Domhnaill, Part 1, ed. and trans. Paul Walsh (London, 1948)'
- James O'Neill, 'Maguire's revolt but Tyrone's war: proxy war in Fermanagh 1593-4', Seanchas Ard Mhacha, Journal of the Armagh Diocesan Historical Society, vol. 26, no. 1 (2016), pp 43–68.
- James O'Neill, The Nine Years War, 1593-1603: O'Neill, Mountjoy and the Military Revolution (Dublin, 2017).
- Scott, Brian G (2017). "The Location of the Battle of the Erne Fords, Belleek, County Fermanagh, 10 October 1593". Ulster Journal of Archaeology. 74: 213–219. ISSN 0082-7355.
