= Warham St Leger (died 1600) =

English army officer

Warham St Leger was an English army officer.

St Leger was from Mollingborne.

St Leger served in Ireland during Lord Deputy Essex's failed campaign. He was one of six royalist witnesses present at a riverside conference with Irish confederates on 7 September 1599.

St Leger was the governor of Leix/Laois.

He died on 1 March [N.S. 11 March] 1600, near Cork, from injuries sustained in a skirmish with Gaelic chieftain Hugh Maguire. St Leger shot Maguire as he approached, though Maguire thrust his lance into St Leger's skull before succumbing to his gunshot wound.

On 31 March 1600, Thomas Denham wrote to Cecil that St Leger's widow "is now preparing herself for the Court, to be a suitor".

He is not to be confused with his uncle, also named Warham St Leger (c. 1525–1597).
