= Warham St Leger =

English soldier, administrator and politician

Sir Warham St Leger PC (Ire) (c. 1525 – 1597) was an English soldier, administrator, and politician, who sat in the Irish House of Commons in the Parliament of 1585–1586.

== Birth and origins ==
Warham was probably born in 1525 in England, the second son of Sir Anthony St Leger and his wife, Agnes Warham. His father was appointed Lord Deputy of Ireland in 1540. His father's family was from Ulcombe, Kent. His mother, the daughter of Sir Hugh Warham of Croydon, was the niece and heiress of William Warham, archbishop of Canterbury. His elder brother died during their father's lifetime, having allegedly been disinherited. He left a son, Warham (d. 1600), who also served in Ireland. His younger brother, Anthony became Master of the Rolls in Ireland in 1593.

Family tree

Warham St Leger with his two wives, his parents, and other selected relatives. (Note: This family tree is based on genealogies of the Viscounts Doneraile.)

Ralph; St Lger d. 1519
Anthony; St Leger c. 1496 – 1559; Lord Deputy	Agnes; Warham
William; St Leger d.v.p.*	Ursula; Neville d. 1575	Warham; St Leger c. 1525 – 1597	Emmeline; Goldwell d. 1628
Warham; St Leger d. 1600	Anthony; St Leger d. 1603	Walter; St Leger
William; St Leger; 1586–1642; President of Munster

Legend

XXX	Subject of the article

*d.v.p. = predeceased his father (decessit vita patris)

== Early life ==
Warham served in Protector Somerset's invasion of Scotland in 1547 as he was a prisoner there until January 1550, when he was ransomed.

In 1553, he fought against supporters of Wyatt's rebellion in Kent, and he may have served in Ireland under his father during Mary's reign. About 1559 he was named a commissioner to transfer to England John Bale's manuscripts and books.

In 1560, he was High Sheriff of Kent. He was soon a member of the Privy Council of Ireland, and in July 1565 he was knighted. Queen Elizabeth I had decided to establish a presidential government in Munster, and in January 1566 St Leger was nominated President of Munster, but locally by Sir Henry Sidney, the Lord Deputy of Ireland; he received instructions dated 1 February, and in the following month was given command of all the levies in Munster.

Elizabeth, however, refused to confirm St Leger's appointment. The reason was that St Leger was a bitter enemy of Thomas Butler, 10th Earl of Ormond, who was a cousin of the Queen on the Boleyn side of her family, and correspondingly friendly with Gerald FitzGerald, 14th Earl of Desmond; and the queen accused St Leger of lukewarmness in arresting Desmond early in 1565. St Leger was consequently recalled, and, in November 1568, Sir John Perrot became president of Munster.

== First marriage and children ==
Probably about 1550 St Leger married firstly Ursula Neville (d. 1575). She was the fifth and youngest daughter of George Neville, 5th Baron Bergavenny, by his third wife, Mary Stafford, youngest daughter of Edward Stafford, 3rd Duke of Buckingham.

Warham and Ursula had five sons and four daughters, including:

- Sir Anthony St Leger (d. 1603), who succeeded to the estates at Ulcombe, Kent. He married Mary Scott (d. 1636), the daughter of Sir Thomas Scott and his first wife Elizabeth Baker. Their son, Warham St Leger (d. 11 October 1631), who was knighted in 1608, married Mary Hayward, the daughter of Sir Rowland Hayward and his second wife Katherine Smythe, by whom he had nine sons and four daughters. He sold Leeds Castle, went with Walter Ralegh to Guyana, and died on 11 October 1631, leaving a son Sir Anthony Leger (d. 1680), who was made Master of the Mint in 1660.
- Anne St Leger (1555–1636), who married Thomas Digges and was mother of Sir Dudley Digges.

== Various offices ==
His father died in 1559 and Warham inherited substantial property in Kent.

In 1569 St Leger returned to England, residing at his house in Southwark or at Leeds Castle, Kent, and serving as High Sheriff of Kent for 1560. There from 1570 to 1572, he had custody of Desmond and his family (see Desmond Rebellions). He left his wife at Carrigaline, County Cork, a manor he held from Desmond; during his absence, it was ravaged by the rebels.

== Second marriage and child ==
By 1577 St Leger married secondly Emmeline Goldwell (d. 1628), by whom he had a son Walter, who obtained his father's Irish property. Emmeline died in London in 1628, and was buried in the church of St Dunstan-in-the-East.

== Later life and death ==
He remained in England until 1579, when his repeated petitions for employment and reward were answered by his appointment as provost-marshal of Munster, a new office, the functions of which seem to have been purely military. In this capacity, St Leger was actively engaged against the Irish rebels for ten years.

On 7 April 1583, he was appointed an assistant to the court of high commission in Ireland, and in the following year, he visited England. While there he accused Ormond of treason, and laid before the queen proposals for the government of Ireland.

In 1585, he was elected to the Irish House of Commons as MP for Queen's County. In November 1589 he was succeeded, probably on account of his old age, as provost marshal by George Thornton, but in 1590 he was governing Munster in the absence of the vice-president. He was in England again in 1594, and died in Cork in 1597.

His will is in the Heralds' College, London. He had literary interests, being a friend of Edmund Spenser and Lodowick Bryskett, and was one of the friends to whom Spenser confided his project of writing The Faerie Queene.

The Warham St Leger who died in combat in 1600 against Hugh Maguire, Lord of Fermanagh, was his nephew, the son of his brother William.

Sir Warham St Leger was the ancestor of the St Legers of Hayward's Hill near Cork city and of the St Legers of Ballingarry, North Tipperary and Shinrone, County Offaly in Ireland.

== Notes and references ==
=== Sources ===
- Burke, Bernard; Burke, Ashworth Peter (1915). A Genealogical and Heraldic History of the Peerage and Baronetage, the Privy Council, Knightage and Companionage (77th ed.). London: Harrison. OCLC 1155471554.
- Clavin, Terry (October 2009). McGuire, James; Quinn, James (eds.). "St Leger, Sir William". Dictionary of Irish Biography.
- Cokayne, George Edward (1916). Gibbs, Vicary (ed.). The complete peerage of England, Scotland, Ireland, Great Britain and the United Kingdom, extant, extinct, or dormant. Vol. IV (2nd ed.). London: St Catherine Press. OCLC 228661424. – Dacre to Dysart (for Doneraile)
- Edwards, David (2004). "St. Leger, Warham". In Matthew, Colin; Harrison, Brian (eds.). Oxford Dictionary of National Biography. Vol. 48. New York: Oxford University Press. pp. 656–658. ISBN 0-19-861398-9.
- Richardson, Douglas (2011). Everingham, Kimball G. (ed.). Magna Carta Ancestry: A Study in Colonial and Medieval Families. Vol. I (2nd ed.). Salt Lake City. ISBN 978-1449966379.
- Richardson, Douglas (2011). Everingham, Kimball G. (ed.). Magna Carta Ancestry: A Study in Colonial and Medieval Families. Vol. III (2nd ed.). Salt Lake City. ISBN 978-1449966393.

Attribution

- This article incorporates text from a publication now in the public domain: Archbold, William Arthur Jobson; Pollard, Albert Frederick (1897). "St. Leger, Warham". In Lee, Sidney (ed.). Dictionary of National Biography. Vol. 50. London: Smith, Elder & Co. pp. 167–168.
