= Cormac MacBaron O'Neill =

Irish soldier & landowner (??–1613)

- Died: 1613; Tower of London, England
- Father: Matthew O'Neill, 1st Baron Dungannon

Sir Cormac MacBaron O'Neill (died 1613) was an Irish nobleman, soldier and landowner. A member of the O'Neill clan of Ulster, he supported his brother Hugh O'Neill, Earl of Tyrone, in the Nine Years' War.

== Family background ==
=== Parentage ===
Cormac MacBaron O'Neill was the son of Gaelic Irish nobleman Matthew O'Neill, 1st Baron Dungannon. The O'Neill clan ruled Tír Eoghain, a Gaelic kingdom in Ulster. His epithet MacBaron ("son of the Baron") referred to his father's title. Matthew was born from an affair between Conn Bacagh O'Neill, 1st Earl of Tyrone, and Alison Kelly, a blacksmith's wife, but was accepted by Conn Bacagh as his son and tanist (designated heir).

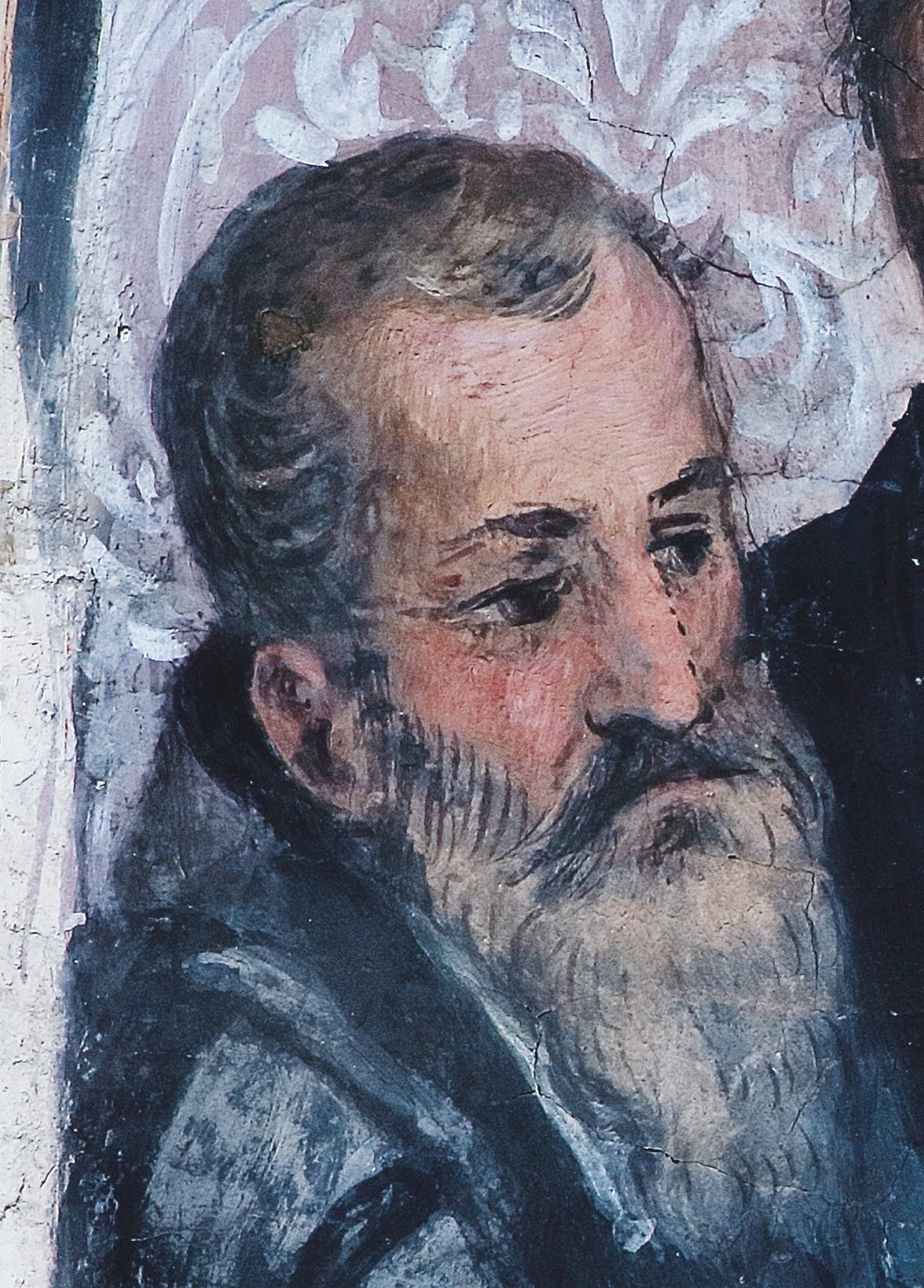
Cormac's brother, Hugh O'Neill

His father's other children were Brian O'Neill, Hugh O'Neill and Art MacBaron O'Neill. Hugh and Brian were sons of Matthew's wife Siobhán Maguire, but the identity of Art and Cormac's mother is disputed. The historian and genealogist John O'Hart stated that Cormac MacBaron and Art MacBaron were illegitimate. Conversely, historian Emmett O'Byrne stated that all four boys were Siobhan's sons. The historian Paul Walsh stated that Siobhán was Cormac's mother. Hiram Morgan and Darren McGettigan referred to Cormac as Hugh's brother, whereas Morgan and Jerrold Casway referred to Art as Hugh's half-brother.

Brian was Matthew and Siobhán's eldest son. Hugh was younger than Brian, and was born around 1550.

=== O'Neill succession conflict ===
During Cormac's childhood, a rivalry formed between his half-uncle Shane and his father Matthew. Conn Bacagh's recognition of Matthew, despite his illegitimacy, offended Shane, a younger legitimate son. Shane asserted that Matthew's father was actually Alison's husband John Kelly to affirm his own claim to the chieftaincy. In the ensuing conflict, the O'Neill family split into rival septs—the "MacShanes" (Shane's immediate family) and the "MacBarons" (Matthew's immediate family). The English encouraged this conflict as it weakened the powerful O'Neill clan.

Shane had Matthew killed in 1558. The English-led Irish government hoped to use the MacBarons' support to curb the MacShanes' growing power in Ulster. At some point between May and August 1558, English statesman Henry Sidney organised the retrieval of Brian and Hugh, who became wards of the Crown. They were raised in Balgriffin—on a property formerly belonging to Conn Bacagh—by the Anglo-Irish Hovenden family.

== Nine Years' War ==
Despite their father's defeat to Shane, Cormac and Hugh were able to re-establish themselves in Ulster thanks to help from the English government. When Hugh, having been recognised as Earl of Tyrone by the Crown, then launched a rebellion in 1594, Cormac joined forces with him. He took part in the Siege of Enniskillen and the Battle of the Ford of the Biscuits the same year. Following their defeat at the Battle of Kinsale, Cormac remained loyal to his brother when most of his other Gaelic Irish changed sides and made peace with the Crown. Following the Burning of Dungannon, in which Tyrone destroyed his own capital, they fought a guerrilla war, and Cormac was able to ambush a force led by Henry Docwra. Nonetheless, his relationship with his brother became increasingly strained, despite the Treaty of Mellifont (1603) in which the Crown pardoned them and restored their lands.

== Later life and death ==
When Hugh O'Neill fled Ireland in 1607, Cormac remained behind, riding to Dublin to inform the authorities of his brother's departure, and claiming he had no part in. His claims however were contradicted by the fact he had learned of his brothers intentions at Dunalonge, being only five miles from the garrisons of Derry or Lifford, both near Lough Swilly where the earl departed. Rather than informing either garrison who would have been better placed to prevent the earl from departing he choose to give the earl as much time as possible by riding to Dublin instead. As such he was arrested and remained in prison for the remainder of his life, although he was never charged with any crime and government officials privately admitted he offered no threat, but should be kept locked up.

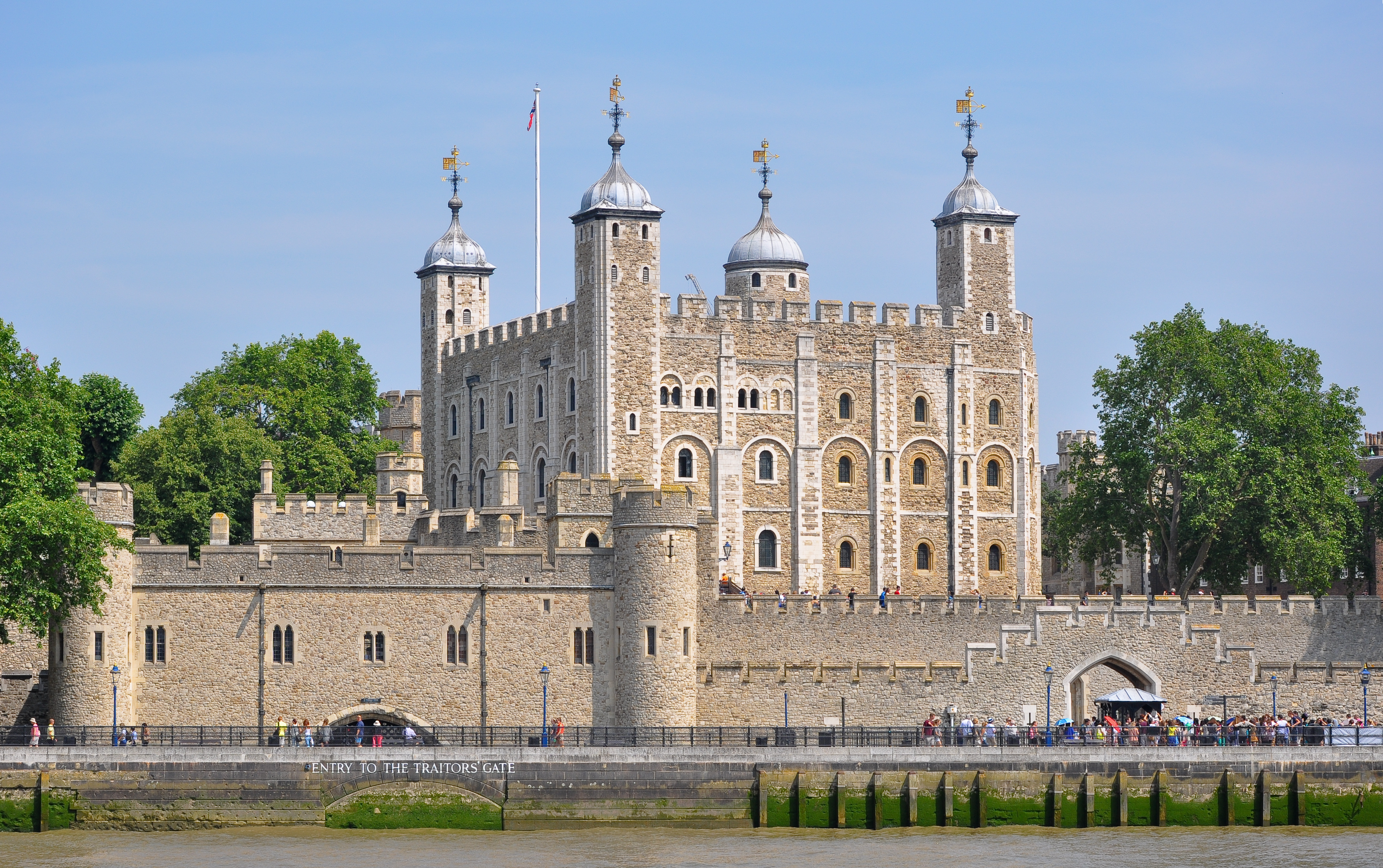
Cormac died during imprisonment in the Tower of London.

Cormac remained in Ireland. By the end of the war, Cormac and Tyrone's relationship had become frayed. The historian John McGurk suggested that Cormac had become a political rival to his brother. On 15 September, Cormac travelled to Dublin to inform Chichester of the earls' departure and to petition for a custodiam of Tyrone's estates. Chichester was suspicious that Cormac took a full day to confer this news. Micheline Kerney Walsh, who argued that the Flight was a tactical retreat, stated that Cormac's absence from the Flight was probably pre-arranged with Tyrone, so he could prepare Ireland for the anticipated Spanish expedition. Cormac was arrested and imprisoned in Dublin Castle. Three months later, in December 1607, he was sent to the Tower of London. He died in the Tower in 1613.

== Marriage and issue ==
Cormac MacBaron O'Neill married Margaret O'Donnell, a sister of Hugh Roe O'Donnell. They had four sons: Brian, Art Oge, Brian Crosach and Conn.

Brian and Art Oge took part in the Flight of the Earls.

Brian Crosach was granted 1,000 acres of land in Dungannon barony as part of the Plantation of Ulster. However, he was hanged in Derry in 1615 for his part in a conspiracy.

Margaret feared for the safety of Conn, her youngest son, who was being sought by authorities. She succeeded in getting him to the Spanish Netherlands, and joined him there in 1622. Conn (also known as Constantino) became an officer in the Spanish Army. He was considered the heir to the Earl of Tyrone by some, but this was not formally recognized because of the Crown's earlier attainder.

Another son of Cormac, named Sean, was a beneficiary in his uncle Hugh O'Neill's will. Sean was brought from Ireland to the Low Countries around 1612 or 1613.

== Bibliography ==
- Brady, Ciaran (2015) [1996]. Shane O'Neill (New ed.). Dublin: University College Dublin Press for the Historical Association of Ireland. ISBN 978-1-91082005-6.
- Canny, Nicholas (7 June 2022). "Hugh O'Neill in Irish historical discourse, c.1550–2021". Irish Historical Studies. 46 (169): 25–51. doi:10.1017/ihs.2022.2. ISSN 0021-1214.
- Casway, Jerrold (2016). "Catherine Magennis and the Wives of Hugh O'Neill". Seanchas Ardmhacha: Journal of the Armagh Diocesan Historical Society. 26 (1): 69–79. ISSN 0488-0196. JSTOR 48568219.
- Farrell, Gerard (2017). The 'Mere Irish' and the Colonisation of Ulster, 1570-1641. Palgrave Macmillan.
- Harris, Frank (Summer 1980). "The State of the Realm: English Military, Political and Diplomatic Responses to the Flight of the Earls, Autumn 1607 to Spring 1608". The Irish Sword–the Journal of the Military History Society of Ireland. XIV (54): 47–64.
- Kerney Walsh, Micheline (1996). An exile of Ireland, Hugh O'Neill, Prince of Ulster. Dublin: Four Courts Press. ISBN 978-1-85182-234-8.
- McGettigan, Darren (2005). Red Hugh O'Donnell and the Nine Years War. Dublin: Four Courts Press. ISBN 978-1-84682-485-2.
- McGurk, John (2007). "The Flight of the Earls: Escape or Strategic Regrouping?". History Ireland. 15 (4): 16–21. ISSN 0791-8224. JSTOR 27725653.
- Morgan, Hiram (September 2014). "O'Neill, Hugh". Dictionary of Irish Biography. doi:10.3318/dib.006962.v1. Archived from the original on 26 September 2023.
- Walsh, Micheline (April 1957). The O'Neills in Spain (PDF). Archived (PDF) from the original on 1 July 2024.
- Walsh, Paul, ed. (1930). The Will and Family of Hugh O'Neill, Earl of Tyrone [with an Appendix of Genealogies]. Dublin: Sign of the Three Candles.
- O'Hart, John (1892). Irish Pedigrees: Or, the Origin and Stem of the Irish Nation. Vol. I (5th ed.). Dublin: James Duffy & Co. OCLC 7239210.
