= River Erne =

River in northwestern Ireland

Coordinates: 54.5074°N 8.2585°W

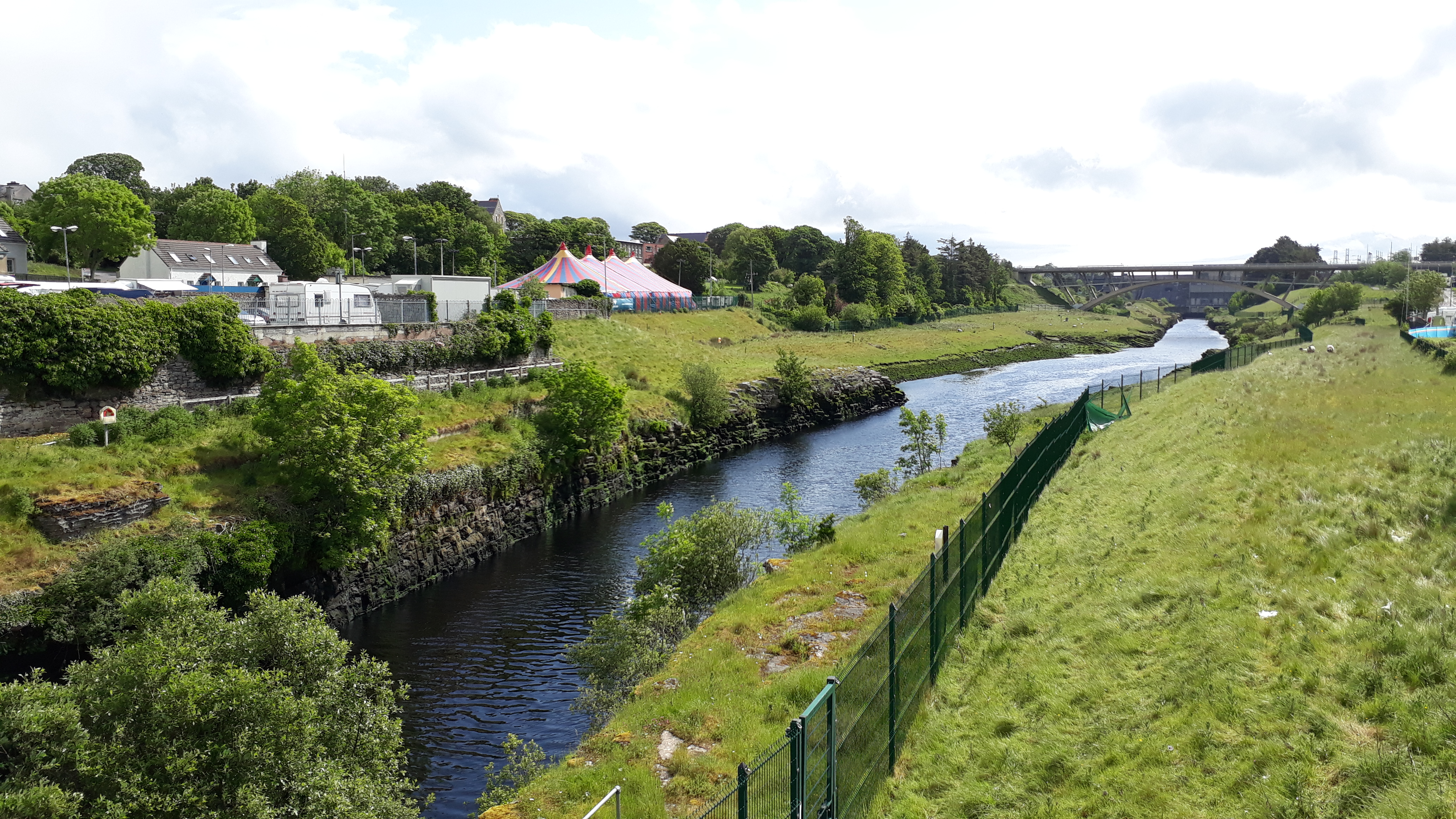
- The River Erne in Ballyshannon
- Native name: An Éirne (Irish)

Location
- Countries: Republic of Ireland, Northern Ireland

Physical characteristics
- Source
  - location: Slieve Glah, County Cavan, Ireland
  - elevation: ~255 m (837 ft)
- Mouth
  - location: Donegal Bay at Ballyshannon, County Donegal
- Length: ~129 km (80 mi)
- Basin size: 4,372 km^{2} (1,688 sq mi)
- Discharge
  - average: 101.7 m^{3}/s (3,590 cu ft/s)

Basin features
- Tributaries
  - left: Arney River, Sillees River
  - right: River Annalee, River Finn (Erne tributary), Colebrooke River, Ballycassidy River, Kesh River, Brannagh River

The River Erne (/ɛərn/ AIRN, Irish: Abhainn na hÉirne or An Éirne) in the northwest of the island of Ireland, is the second-longest river in Ulster, flowing through Northern Ireland and the Republic of Ireland, and forming part of their border.

== Course ==
The Erne rises on the east shoulder of Slieve Glah mountain three miles south of Cavan in County Cavan, Republic of Ireland, and flows 80 miles (129 km) through Lough Gowna, Lough Oughter and Upper and Lower Lough Erne, County Fermanagh, Northern Ireland, to the sea at Ballyshannon, County Donegal back in the Republic. The river is 120 kilometres long and is used for fly fishing for trout and salmon, with a number of fisheries along both the river itself and its tributaries. The town of Enniskillen is mostly situated on an island in the river, between Upper and Lower Lough Erne. It is linked to the River Shannon by the Shannon–Erne Waterway.

The total catchment area of the River Erne is 4,372 km^{2}. The long-term average rate of the River Erne is 101.7 cubic metres per second (m^{3}/s).

== Name ==
The river takes its name from a mythical princess named Éirne.

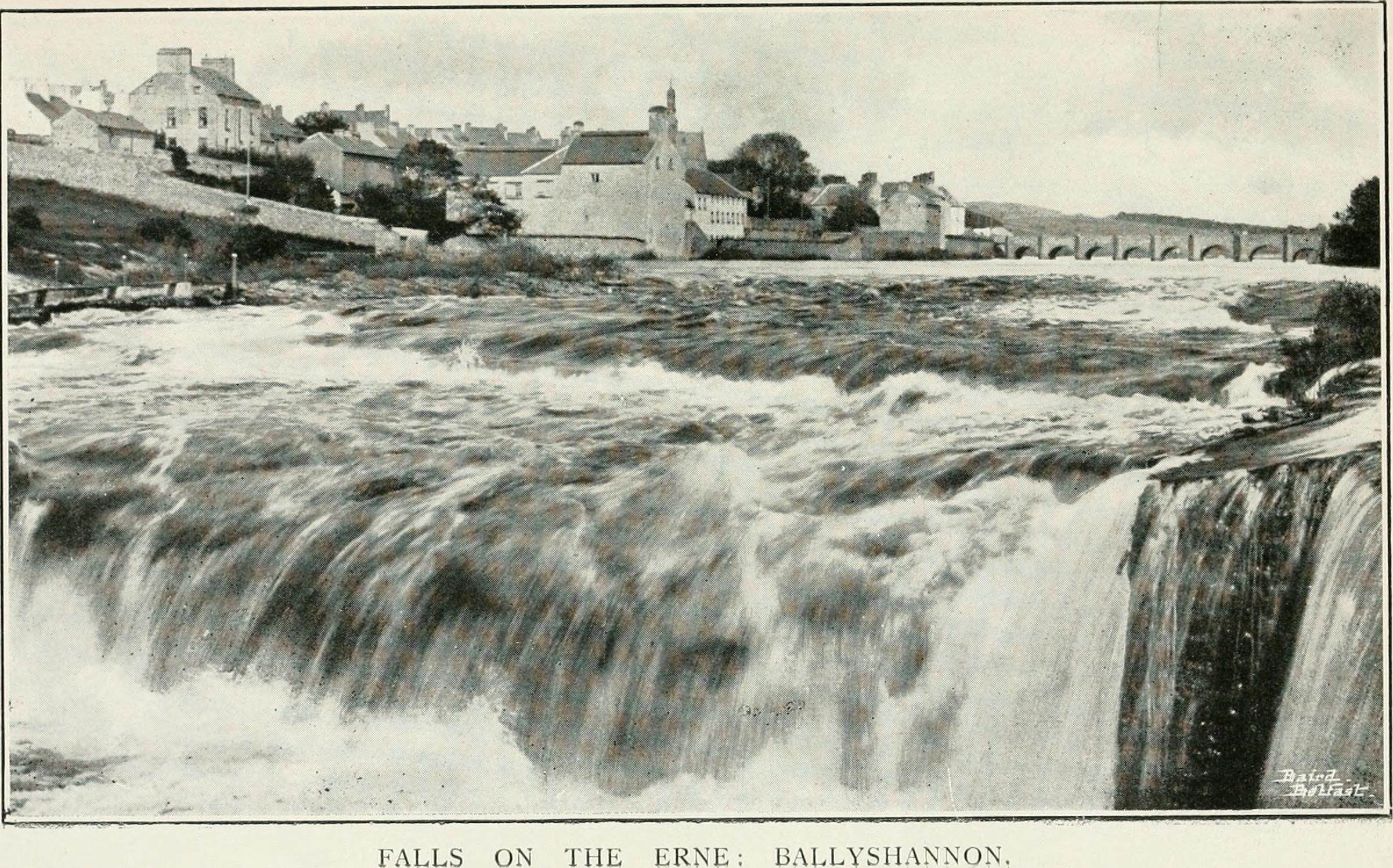

== Pleasure boating ==
Live-aboard pleasure cruisers operate from several locations along the Erne waterway, including Belturbet, Knockniny, Carrybridge, Bellanaleck, Enniskillen, and Killadeas. In addition to the use of the Erne for live-aboard boating holidays, sections of the river are used for water skiing, bank fishing, trolling, jet skiing and scuba diving. Boaters are cautioned, by the Northern Ireland Tourist Board, that Upper Lough Erne is a maze of small islands needing careful navigation, and waves on Lower Lough Erne can reach "open-sea dimensions".

== Ancient ruins ==
The Erne waterway is home to ancient ruins, both Christian and Pagan, with ruins found in several locations, including: Crom Estate, on the North bank of the Upper Erne channel, Gad Island, near Crom Estate, Devenish Island, Inismacsaint Island, Davy’s Island, White Island, and Boa Island. Many of these locations can only be reached by boat.

Devenish Island has a historical display centre adjacent to its ruins. Visitors sometimes use rental boats and the Ordnance Survey of Northern Ireland Activity Map of Lough Erne (ISBN 978-1-905306-26-8) to locate these ancient sites.

== Culture ==
The song Buachaill Ón Éirne is an Irish ballad about a young boy from the Erne area. It has been recorded by such groups as Clannad and The Corrs.

The Erne is also mentioned in a traditional song, An Mhaighdeán Mhara, which has been recorded by Mairéad Ní Mhaonaigh of Altan, Maighread Ní Dhomhnaill, and Moya Brennan.

== Former railway lines ==
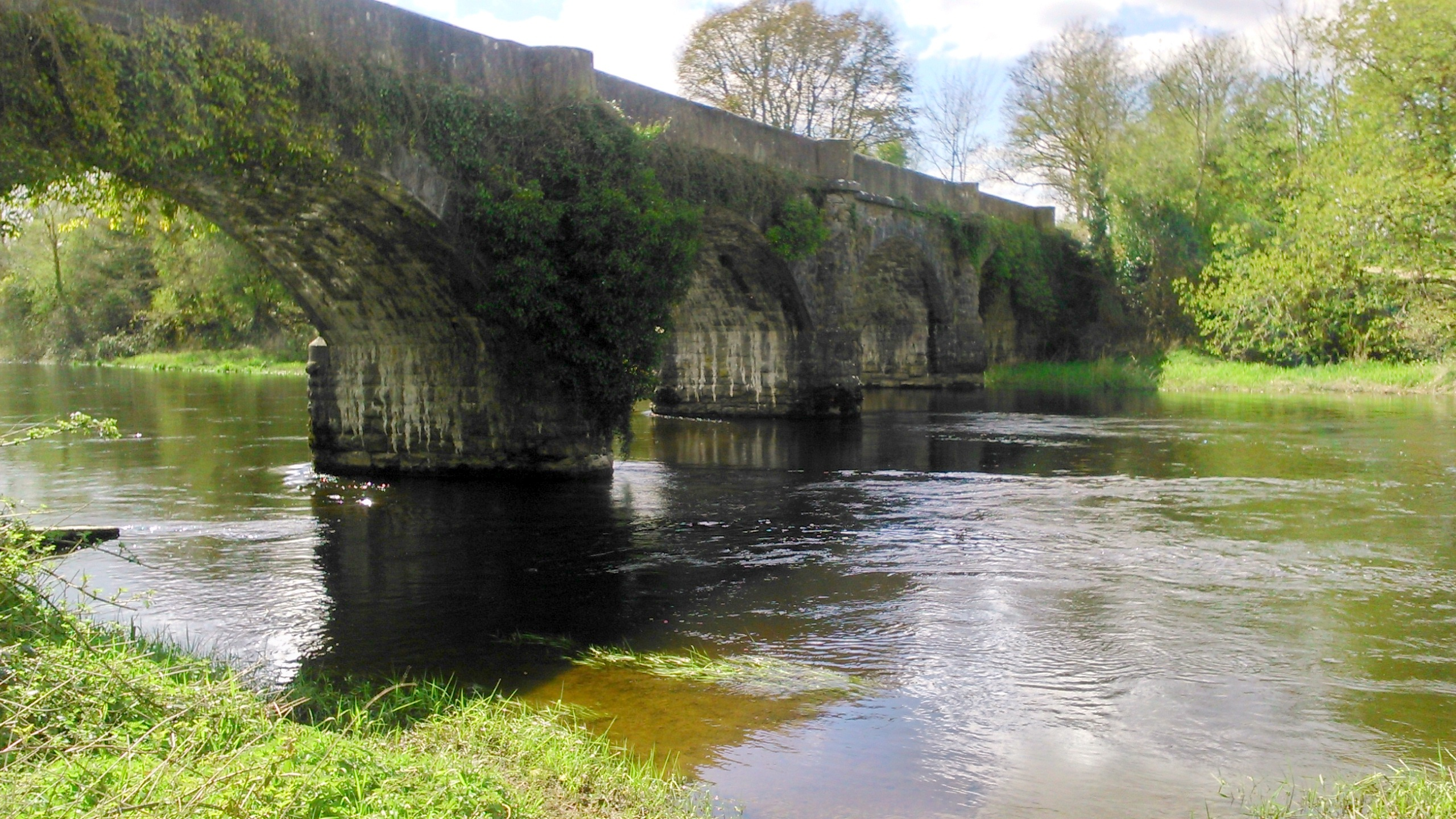
A remnant of the GNR being a viaduct spanning the river near Belturbet railway station.

A number of places were once accessible by train along the River Erne, with the once extensive Great Northern Railway and the Sligo, Leitrim and Northern Counties Railway both serving the area.
