= Arney River =

River in County Fermanagh, Northern Ireland, tributary of the Erne

Coordinates: 54°18′N 7°48′W

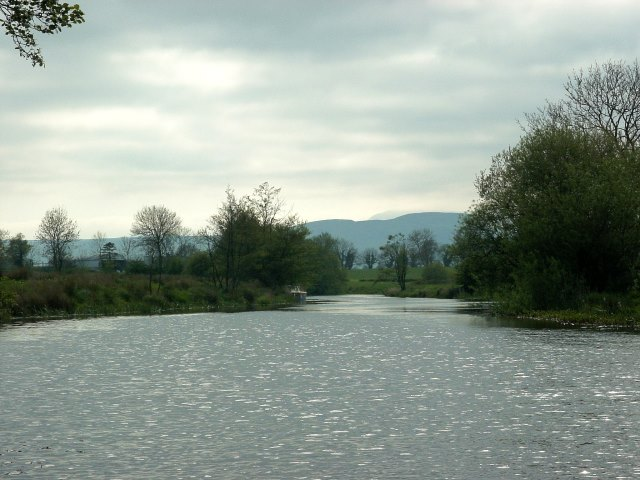
River Arney near Bellanaleck

The Arney River is a small river in County Fermanagh, Northern Ireland, feeding from Lower Lough MacNean and into Upper Lough Erne. It meanders through a wide, flat Glacial Trough between the uplands of Fermanagh, Belmore Mountain and the Cuilcagh Mountains. The valley is characterised by wide flat lowlands enclosed by low hills. The Cladagh River drains into the Arney River.

There are six bridging points on the Arney River, five of these are suitable for motorised vehicles, while one is located on private land near to the source of the river.

== Angling ==
The river is often used by amateur anglers who are fishing for salmon and trout, however, the river is mainly populated by perch.

== Name ==
There is a local tradition of an area beside the river called the Red Meadow alluding to blood soaking into the fields during the Battle of the Ford of the Biscuits. Alternatively the local brick making industry may also have given rise to this name as the river was lined with brick fields during the eighteenth and nineteenth centuries.

== See also ==
- Rivers of Ireland
- List of rivers of Ireland
