= Humphrey Willis =

English soldier (died 1602)

Captain Humphrey Willis (died 1602) was an English soldier in Ireland in the sixteenth century, his parents are unknown. Captain Willis was appointed Sheriff of County Donegal and County Fermanagh by the Lord Deputy of Ireland William FitzWilliam. Captain Willis was a fluent speaker of Irish, and enforced his authority with a detachment of the Irish Army.

Willis' appointment in Donegal antagonised the local Gaelic lords the O'Donnells who had traditionally enjoyed a close relationship with the Crown.

According to a 1614 history of Donegal Abbey written in Louvain, "The entire principality was plundered by Fitzwilliam's sheriff's and captains, to whom he sold the appointments. The more remote the shire and the more Irish, the larger the sum paid. One Boen, for example, obtained a captaincy for a bribe of two gold chains, which he gave to the sordid deputy's wife; and another, named Willis, got a similar preferment for sixty pounds. These unscrupulous marauders pillaged the country and held the heads of families in their grasp until ransomed, some for two hundred, and others for three hundred cows; and when the cattle were not forthcoming they tortured their prisoners by frying the soles of their feet in seething butter and brimstone. As for our friars, they were obliged to betake themselves, with muniments and altar-plate, to the fastness of the mountains, to avoid Willis and his brigands; who a few months before Hugh Roe's return, swooped down upon Donegal in the dead of night, killing thirty of its inhabitants, and occupying the monastery as a garrison."

Following his escape from his imprisonment in Dublin Castle, the young heir to the O'Donnell leadership Hugh Roe O'Donnell drove Willis out of Donegal, one of the actions that anticipated the coming Tyrone's Rebellion. In 1593 Willis had a new role as Sheriff of Fermanagh. Again he clashed with a local Gaelic lord Hugh Maguire who drove him out of the area. Maguire entered into open rebellion in the crown; and in 1594 laid siege to Enniskillen, attempting to retake the castle and triggering an outbreak of fighting that became Nine Years of War in Ireland, culminating in the flight of the Earls from Ireland in 1607.

He helped organise Sir Henry Docwra's expedition to Derry in 1600, to support a regime change war launched in Tyrconnell by Hugh Roe's kinsman (cousin and brother-in-law), Niall Garbh Ó Domhnaill, against O'Donnell and his ally Hugh O'Neill, Earl of Tyrone.

Captain Humphrey Willis was killed in action in Ulster in 1602, a report to the Lord Deputy and Council & to the English Privy Council dated 14 July 1602 recorded the deaths of Sir John Barkley and Captain Willis during a campaign led by Lord Mountjoy against Tyrone in Monaghan "to push him from the plains into the fastness where he now is."

George Willis of Aghatirourke, who discovered the Florencecourt Yew, was a descendant.

== Bibliography ==
- McGurk, John (2006). Sir Henry Docwra 1564–1631 – Derry's Second Founder. Dublin: Four Courts Press. ISBN 1-85182-948-2.
- Meehan, Charles Patrick (1870). The Rise and Fall of the Irish Franciscan Monasteries (3 ed.). Dublin: J. Duffy.
- Morgan, Christopher. William Cecil, Ireland, and the Tudor State. Oxford University Press, 2012.
