= Fermanagh =

Historical Irish Gaelic kingdom

Fermanagh Fir Manach (Irish)
- 10th century–1607
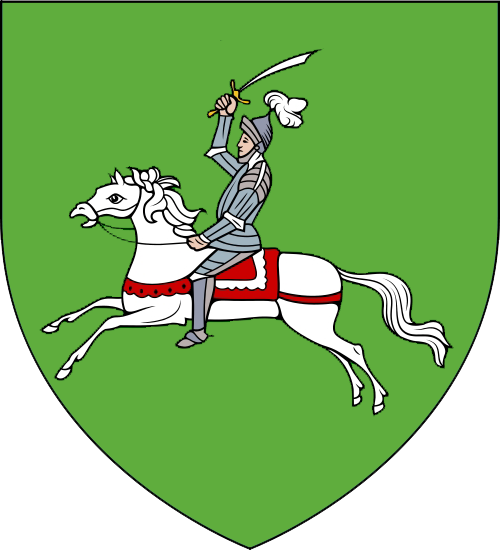
- Coat of arms

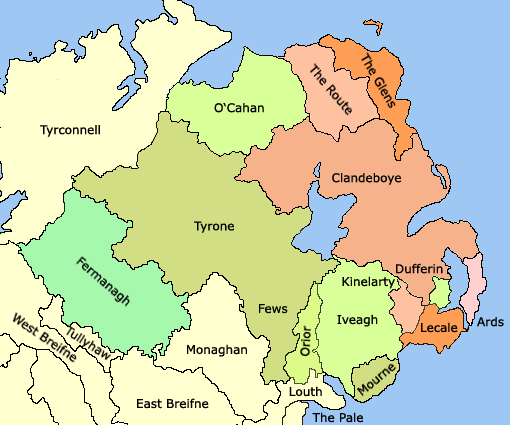
- Fermanagh in the 15th–16th centuries
- Capital: Lisnaskea
- Common languages: Irish
- Government: Elective monarchy
- King / Chief
  - d.1009: Cathal Ó Dubhdara
  - 1600–1607: Cú Chonnacht Óg Mag Uidhir (last; half-brother of Hugh Maguire)
- History
  - Established: 10th century
  - Disestablished: 1607
Preceded by	Succeeded by
Airgíalla	County Fermanagh; Kingdom of Ireland
- Today part of: United Kingdom of Great Britain and Northern Ireland

Historically, Fermanagh (Irish: Fir Manach), as opposed to the modern County Fermanagh, was a kingdom of Gaelic Ireland, associated geographically with present-day County Fermanagh. Fir Manach originally referred to a distinct kin group of alleged Laigin origins. The kingdom of Fermanagh was formed in the 10th century, out of the larger kingdom of Uí Chremthainn, which was part of the overkingdom of Airgíalla. By the late 11th century it had grown to cover all of what is now County Fermanagh. The kingdom came to be ruled by the Mag Uidhir (Maguire) clan from the late 13th century onward. They were based at Lisnaskea, and their royal inauguration site was nearby Sgiath Gabhra (Skeagoura), now called Cornashee. Under Hugh Maguire, Fermanagh was involved in the Nine Years' War against English rule. His successor, Cú Chonnacht Óg Mag Uidhir, was one of the Gaelic Irish leaders who fled Ireland during the Flight of the Earls. Fermanagh was subsequently merged into the Kingdom of Ireland as County Fermanagh.

== History ==
=== Laighin ancient origins ===
The original Fir Manach or Fear Manach, that is to say the Manach or Monaigh people in the north of Ireland, claimed descent from the Laighin of Leinster. They reached upper Lough Erne in ancient times. According to the Book of Glendalough (also known as the Rawlinson B 502) a genealogy is provided for the early Manach people and they claim descent from Dáire Barrach, the son of Cathair Mór, High King of Ireland. Dáire Barrach's descendants elsewhere in Ireland are today known as the MacGorman (Mac Gormáin) and ruled Uí Bairrche during the Middle Ages. Cathair Mór himself had ruled Ireland as King of Tara in the 2nd century.

=== Connachta and Three Collas ===
The geopolitical situation in Ireland changed during the 4th and 5th centuries, owing to the rise of the descendants of Conn of the Hundred Battles. Most significantly for the Fir Manach, the kingdoms of Airgíalla (under the descendants of the Three Collas), the kingdom of Ailech (under the Uí Néill) and the kingdom of Connacht (under the Uí Briúin) arose. According to Peadar Livingstone, the territory of Fermanagh became disputed between these groups and the previously ruling Fir Manach people.

=== 11th century onwards ===
By the end of the 11th century, Fermanagh had decisively re-emerged as a sovereign kingdom in the region. The rulers of this kingdom were drawn from the Airgíalla. Early on the territory drew kings from three branches of Clann Lugainn; the Ó hEignigh (O'Heany), Maolruanaidh (Mulrooney) and Ó Dubhdara (Darragh). These families claimed descent from the Three Collas, in the person of Colla Fochríth and were thus kinsmen of the MacMahon kings of Airgíalla. Towards the end of the 13th century, the Mag Uidhir (Maguire) arose to the kingship of Fermanagh and with the exception of some challenges from the Ó Domhnaill of Tyrconnell, this would remain the situation until the end of the kingdom in 1607 with the Flight of the Earls.

== Kings of Fermanagh ==
The Annals of the Four Masters mention the following as Kings of Fermanagh (Irish: Fir Manach).

- Cathal Ó Dubhdara (died 1009)
- Niall Ó hÉicnigh (died 1053)
- Domhnall Ó Mael Ruanaidh (died 1057)
- Giolla Críst Ó Dubhdara (died 1076)
- Ó hÉicnigh (died 1095)
- Laidhgnén Ó Dubhdara (died 1118)
- Ó Mael Ruanaidh (1126)
- Gilla Críost Ó hÉicnigh (died 1127), also over-king of Airgíalla.
- Faelán Ó Dubhdara (died 1128)
- Ó Mael Ruanaidh (died 1160)
- Mac an Oíche Ó Mael Ruanaidh (1189)
- Aonghus Mac Giolla Fhinnéin (died 1234)
- Domhnall Mór Ó Domnhaill (died 1241), also king of Tyrconnell (Tír Chonaill).
- Flaithbertach Ó Daimin (died 1275)
- Donn Mág Uidhir (died 1298)
- Mac Craith Mág Uidhir (died 1306)
- Flaithbertach Mág Uidhir (died 1324)
- Aodh Ó Domhnaill (died 1333), also king of Tyrconnell.
- Ruaidhri Mág Uidhir (died 1338)
- Aodh Ruadh Mág Uidhir (1360)
- Pilib Mág Uidhir (died 1366)
- Brian Mág Uidhir (died 1373)
- Pilib 'na Tuagh' Mág Uidhir (died 1394)
- Tomás Mór Mág Uidhir - the son of Pilib na Tuagh Mág Uidhir - (died 1430)
- Tomás Óg Mág Uidhir (abdicated 1471; died 1480)
- Éamonn Mág Uidhir (or, 'Éamonn mac Tomás Óg Mág Uidhir') deposed 1488 (died 1488, later that year)
- Tomás Óg mac Tomás Óg Mág Uidhir (died 1501)
- Seaán Mág Uidhir (died 1503)
- Conchobhar Mór Mág Uidhir (died 1527)
- Cú Chonnacht Óg ‘an Comharba’ Mág Uidhir (died 1537)
- Giolla Pádraig Bán Mág Uidhir (died 1540)
- Seán Mág Uidhir (died 1566)
- Cú Chonnacht Óg Mág Uidhir (died 1589)
- Aodh Mág Uidhir (or, 'Hugh Maguire') (died 1601)
- Cú Chonnacht Óg Mág Uidhir (fled 1607 in the Flight of the Earls; died 1608)
