= List of shipwrecks in the 16th century =

The list of shipwrecks in the 16th century includes ships sunk, wrecked or otherwise lost between (and including) the years 1501 to 1600.

== 1501–1510 ==
=== 1502 ===
- 11 July El Dorado: The Spanish carrack sank during a hurricane in the Mona Channel between Hispaniola and Puerto Rico with the loss of all on board. El Dorado was the flagship of a thirty-two strong fleet heading for Spain. Sources vary but at least another sixteen ships were also wrecked.
- 11 July Santa Maria del Antigua: Part of the fleet led by Francisco de Bobadilla, the Spanish carrack sank during a hurricane off Santo Domingo.
- 5 October Mîrî: Attacked by Captain Matoso on the orders of Vasco da Gama, the pilgrim ship was captured at Madayi, India and the cargo taken. The Muslim pilgrims travelling from Calicut, India to Mecca were locked in the hold, the ship set on fire and sunk by artillery taking several days to sink. The survivors were speared by Portuguese soldiers and an estimated three hundred people killed. The ship was a victim of the 4th Portuguese India Armada led by Vasco da Gama.
- unknown date San Antón: The Spanish caravel ran aground on the (future) site of Port-au-Prince, Haiti while attempting to recover gold from the wreck of the Santa María de Gracia. The crew was picked up by the Santo Domingo.
- unknown date Santa María de Gracia: The Spanish caravel sank near the coast of Hispaniola after the hull was weakened by shipworm.

=== 1503 ===
- 30 April Esmeralda ( Portugal): Driven ashore on the Khuriya Muriya Islands during a typhoon. Led by Vicente Sodré (captain of a squadron) and part of the 4th Portuguese India Armada led by Vasco da Gama.
- 30 April São Pedro ( Portugal): Driven ashore on the Khuriya Muriya Islands during a typhoon. Led by Brás Sodré and part of the 4th Portuguese India Armada led by Vasco da Gama

=== 1505 ===
- 4 May Bela ( Portugal): The carrack, was part of an armada commanded by Tristão da Cunha, the first Viceroy of Portuguese India, and ran aground on the coast of Guinea.

== 1511–1520 ==
=== 1511 ===
- 20 April — São Pedro ( Portugal): While on a journey to India, with five other caravels under the command of Garcia de Noronha, the islets of Saint Peter and Saint Paul was accidentally discovered when the São Pedro sailed onto one of them. The crew was rescued by the Saint Paul, hence the name of the archipelago.
- Unknown date — Santa María de la Barca (Spain): Ran aground or was lost in a storm off Yucatan or Jamaica.

=== 1512 ===
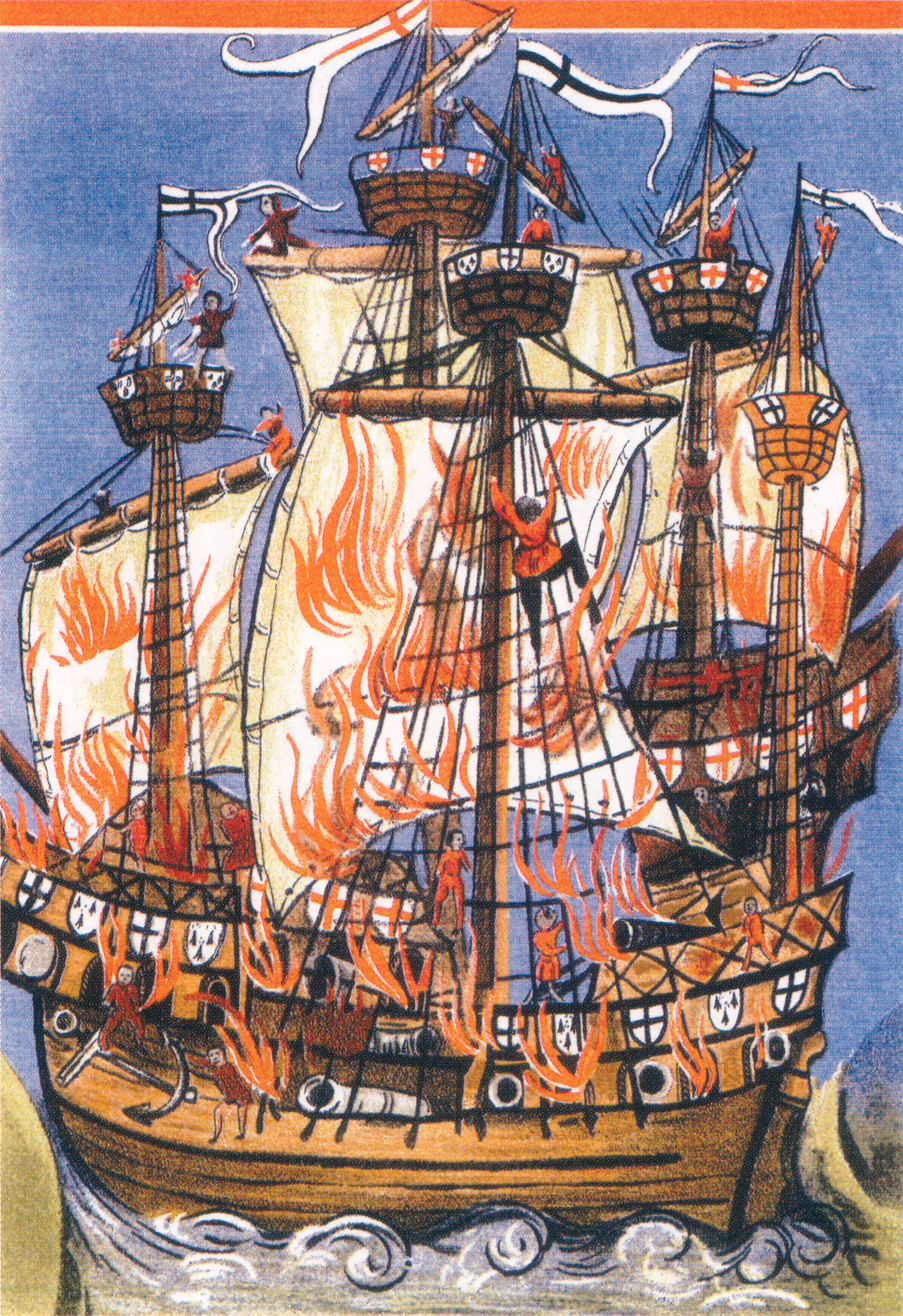
Cordelière and Regent.

- 10 August — Cordelière (also known as Marie-la-Cordelière) ( Brittany): During the Battle of Saint-Mathieu, Admiral Portzmoguer fearing defeat blew up his own ship and one English ship, HMS Regent as well.
- 10 August — HMS Regent (Royal Navy): Sank near Brest, France, during the Battle of Saint-Mathieu, after an explosion on the Breton ship Cordelière.

=== 1514 ===
- 21 February (first report) — Unidentified (Spain): Lost at Polkemyas (now known as Porth Kidney sands), near Lelant, St Ives Bay, Cornwall, in the manor of Lelant and Trevethowe. She was carrying a cargo of cloth (including scarlet).

=== 1515 ===
- Unidentified vessel: Wrecked on Eastern Green, Penzance, while carrying a cargo of spices and textiles.
- Unidentified vessel: Wrecked between Lelant Water and Porthroppter while on a voyage from Dublin with a cargo of "hydes and frys" (coarse woollen cloth).

=== 1516 ===
- 22 February (first report) — Seven ships and ″barks″: Lost between Lelant Water and St Ives, Cornwall, laden with iron cast goods, cloth and other wares.
- 15 September — Lomellina: The carrack from Genoa sank during a tornado while under repair in the bay at Villefranche-sur-Mer, Duchy of Savoy.

=== 1517 ===
- Unidentified vessel: Wrecked at Porthcurno, Cornwall with a cargo of cloth and pewter.

=== 1517 or 1518 ===
- Unidentified vessel: Wrecked near Carrack Loys, near Marckayowe (St Michael's Mount), Cornwall with a cargo of hogsheads of wine, which was divided between James Chynowythe, Richard Pendre and Sir John Arundell.

=== 1518 ===
- 4 May — Engelen: The Royal Danish Navy, four masted sailing ship was destroyed by fire while moored in the Oyarzun river, Basque Country.
- Unidentified vessel: Wrecked in "Whitson Bay at the Lands End", Cornwall witnessed by John Davye. She was carrying wines and fruit and all on board were saved.

=== 1520 ===
- 22 May — Santiago (Spain): The nau ran aground at the mouth of the river Santa Cruz, Argentina. She was one of five ships in Ferdinand Magellan's circumnavigation around the world. The wreck was discovered in 1985 by Daniel E Guillén. According to media reports, Guillén recovered a small part of the wreck's wood and had it analyzed as an authentic Spanish vessel, but he has refused to register and claim the discovery for fear that the government will mismanage the wreck. Prior to this discovery, the oldest shipwreck in the New World was the San Esteban (1554 shipwreck) found off the coast of Texas.
- Unidentified vessel: A frigate was wrecked in Studland Bay, Dorset.

== 1521–1530 ==
=== 1521 ===
- 2 May — Concepción (Spain): The nau was deliberately abandoned and burnt in the Philippines. She was part of a fleet of five ships and 234 men led by Ferdinand Magellan.

=== 1523 ===
- Nao (Spain): The nao grounded on a shoal in the British Virgin Islands. The crew was rescued by another ship which ran aground on Anegada and later refloated.
- Trinidad (Spain): The nao was wrecked in a storm at Ternate c.1523.

=== 1525 ===
- 19 November — SV Corpo Santo ( Portugal): The nau ran aground at Cape Roçalgate, Oman while en route to India.

=== 1526 ===
- 14 January — Sancti Spiritus (Spain): The carrack was one of seven ships in the Loaisa expedition passing through the Strait of Magellan when she was wrecked on the coast west of Punta Dungenes. Her crew were rescued by the Anunciada.
- 16 February — Anunciada (Spain): The carrack was one of seven ships in the Loaisa expedition from A Coruña, Spain westwards to the spice route. She was wrecked in the Strait of Magellan.
- 1 June — Pedro Serrano's patache (Spain): Wrecked while en route for Santa Marta from Cuba on the Serrana Bank. Pedro Serrano and the ship's boy was said to have been stranded there for eight years.
- June — San Lesmes (Spain): The nau was not seen after passing through the Strait of Magellan. She was part of a seven ship expedition led by García Jofre de Loaísa to find a westerly route for the spice trade.
- Unknown date — San Gabriel (Spain): The nau was wrecked during a storm, after passing Cape Frio, Brazil. She was part of a seven ship expedition led by García Jofre de Loaísa to find a westerly route for the spice trade.
- Unknown date&‐ Santa Maria del Parral(Spain): Ran aground on Sangihe Island, Archipelago Sulawesi. She was part of a seven ship expedition led by García Jofre de Loaísa to find a westerly route for the spice trade.
- Unknown date — Santa Teresa (Spain): The caravel was lost at the entrance to the Gallegos River, Santa Cruz Province, Argentina.

=== 1527 ===
- 19 January — St Anthony or Santo António ( Portugal): The carrack foundered in Gunwalloe Bay, Cornwall, en route from Lisbon to Antwerp. She had a mixed cargo including copper and silver ingots, said to be worth an estimated £100 million in early 21st century values. One half of the crew was lost. The wreck was located in 1981 and a selection of her cargo can be seen in the Charlestown Shipwreck, Rescue and Heritage Centre, Charlestown. Also reported as Saint Andrew and sinking on 19 January 1526. The site is designated under the Protection of Wrecks Act 1973.

== 1531–1540 ==
=== 1531 ===
- Unidentified vessel Wrecked on the cliffs near "Innyall Chappell (Chapel Jane, Gurnard's Head), Cornwall with the loss of all on board. The vessel was carrying salt. Anchors, cables and timber was salvaged and shared 50/50 between the finders and Sir John Arundell, Master Lord of the Franchise.

=== 1532 ===
- (First report) — Unidentified vessels: Harry Angwyne sworn at Court that he often saw wrecks of timbers cast on the land at Whitsonbay and other places around Land's End, Cornwall.
- (First report) — Unidentified vessel: Lost at the Longships, off Land's End, Cornwall.
- (First report) — Unidentified vessel: Barrel of tar washed up at Gwynver, Sennen, Cornwall and barrel of flower (flour) washed up in Whitson Bay in Gonhellye under Meen.

=== 1533 ===
- Bom Jesus (Portugal) — The ship was wrecked on the coast of Africa near the mouth of the Orange River while on a voyage from Lisbon to India.

=== 1537 ===
- 30 November — Concepción (Spain): The Carrack (nau) was wrecked at Ponta Loyola, estuary of the Gallegos River, Argentina while part of a two ship trading expedition. The crew were rescued by the Santa Maria .

=== 1540 ===
- 23 January — Capitana (Spain): The carrack (nau) was part of an expedition to the Pacific coast of South America when she was wrecked north-east of the Primera Angostura, within the Strait of Magellan. The crew was rescued by another of the expedition's ships.
- January — Trinidad (Spain): The sailing ship was seen at Cedros Island, Baja California before heading north and not seen again.

== 1541–1550 ==
=== 1542 ===
- 18 February — A hoy barque (flag unknown) was wrecked on the Goodwin Sands, Kent, England.
- 29 December — Bonne Aventure (France): Wrecked south of Les Sables-d'Olonne, France
- unknown date — Grifo ( Portugal): The cargo ship was wrecked in the bay of Angra, Terceira Island. Oldest known wreck on the island since colonisation.
- unknown date — San Juan (Spain): The nau foundered near the island of São Miguel, Azores.
- unknown date — San Miguel (Spain): The galleon sank near Hispaniola.

=== 1543 ===
- 25 July — Capitana de la Saane (France): Lost during a battle off Corcubión, Cape Finisterre, Spain.
- Unknown date — Moutier (France): The fishing boat ran aground at Noirmoutier, France.
- Unknown date — An Unidentified ship (Portugal) was wrecked on the Goodwin Sands, Kent, England.

=== 1544 ===
- Unknown date — Three vessels (flags unknown) were wrecked on the Goodwin Sands, Kent, England.

=== 1545 ===
- 19 July — Battle of the Solent: Mary Rose (England): Capsized within 1.5 miles (2.4 km) of Portsmouth harbour, in 40 ft (12 m) of water. Approximately seven hundred men lost their lives.
- 28 November — Santa Clara (Spain): The galleon was lost in a storm off Hispaniola.

=== 1550 ===
- (first report) — Pwll Fanog (Wales): Wrecked in the Menai Strait, Gwynedd, Wales.
- (first report) — Santa Maria de la Piedad (Spain): The sailing ship out of Hispaniola, was wrecked on Terceira Island, Azores. Some of the cargo was salvaged.

== 1551–1560 ==
=== 1552 ===
- 8 June — São João ( Portugal): The galleon was wrecked during a storm near Port Edward, South Africa. Approximately 120 died in the wreck while the remaining 500 survivors had to march to the mouth of the Maputo River. Only twenty-five survived due to attacks from indigenous people, starvation and disease.
- La Magdalena (Spain): The nau was wrecked in the Azores.
- Santiago (Spain): The nau sank in the harbour at Angra, Terceira Island, Azores after unloading the cargo from Mexico.

=== 1553 ===
- Six unnamed vessels (Spain): The ships sank in the Gulf of Mexico off Padre Island.
- October — Bona Confidentia, Bona Esperanza and Edward Bonaventure (all England): The ships became trapped in ice off the coast of what is now Canada. Their crews perished in January 1554.

=== 1554 ===
- 21 April — São Bento ( Portugal): The carrack ran aground in the mouth of the Msikaba River, midway between Port Edward and Port St. Johns on the Transkei coast of South Africa. The cargo included slaves and pepper, and up to 450 people lost their lives.
- 29 April — Espiritu Santo (Spain): Part of a treasure fleet en route for Havana, Cuba from Veracruz, Mexico, three galleons were wrecked in a storm off Padre Island, Texas.
- 29 April — San Esteban (Spain): Part of a treasure fleet en route for Havana, Cuba from Veracruz, Mexico, three galleons were wrecked in a storm off Padre Island, Texas.
- 29 April — Santa Maria de Yciar (Spain): Part of a treasure fleet en route for Havana, Cuba from Veracruz, Mexico, three galleons were wrecked in a storm off Padre Island, Texas.
- Bona Confidentia (England): Part of a three ship expedition, led by Sir Hugh Willoughby, for the Company of Merchant Adventurers of London to find the Northeast Passage to China. Along with Bona Esperanza the two ships attempted to overwinter near the Kola Peninsula, east of Murmansk, Grand Duchy of Moscow. The remains of sixty-two sailors were found in the spring of 1554 by Moscovian fishermen.
- Bona Esperanza (England): Part of a three ship expedition, led by Sir Hugh Willoughby, for the Company of Merchant Adventurers of London to find the Northeast Passage to China. Along with Bona Confidentia the two ships attempted to overwinter near the Kola Peninsula, east of Murmansk, Grand Duchy of Moscow. The remains of sixty-two sailors were found in the spring of 1554 by Moscovian fishermen.
- La Maria (Spain): The carrick was wrecked to the south of Pico Island, Azores.
- Nuestra Señora de Guadalupe (Spain): The nau was wrecked on São Jorge Island, Azores.
- Santa Maria de Camino (Spain): Lost off the coast of Florida.

=== 1555 ===
- Ascenção (Algarvia Velha) ( Portugal): Foundered in the Bay of Angra, Terceira Island, Azores while returning from the East Indies.
- Unidentified Spanish or Spanish-Netherlands vessel wrecked on the Bartholomew Ledge, Isles of Scilly. The oldest known wreck site in the Isles of Scilly, which is protected under the Protection of Wrecks Act 1973, and identified from silver two reale coins, six breech loading cannon and other artifacts.

=== 1556 ===
- 18 June — Nossa Senhora da Ajuda ( Portugal): The nau hit a shoal near Alagoas, Brazil. She was carrying the first bishop of Brazil from Salvador to Lisbon. All of the 103 (bar one) on-board survivors were massacred by natives while on the way to Maceió.
- 6 August — Nossa Senhora da Assunção ( Portugal): Foundered in the Bay of Angra, Terceira Island, Azores.
- 6 August — Nossa Senhora da Vitória ( Portugal): Foundered in the Bay of Angra, Terceira Island, Azores.
- Unknown date — Sancta Salbador (Spain): Lost off Florida.

=== 1557 ===
- 14 November — Abrigada ( Portugal): The patache sank at Queimada, Azores.

=== 1558 ===
- 25 February — San Sebastian (Spain): The carrack (nau) ran aground during a gale on the coast of Chile near Canal Trinidad.
- Unidentified A ship carrying people from Dublin is said to have run aground off Rathlin Island, northern Ireland.

=== 1559 ===
- 21 November — Nossa Senhora da Graça ( Portugal): The carrack (nau) foundered during a storm and sank between Mozambique and Cochin, India. The crew were rescued by the Aquia ( Portugal) and the captain died shortly after.

== 1561–1570 ==
=== 1564 ===
- 30 May — Mars (Makalös) ( Sweden): The warship was lost during a battle involving the Swedish navy and the Danish–Lübeck navy, between the Swedish islands of Öland and Gotland. The wreck was found on 19 August 2011.

=== 1565 ===
- San Juan (Spain): A Basque whaling ship sank at Red Bay, Labrador.
- Unnamed sailing vessel foundered in Mount's Bay, Cornwall, possibly near Newlyn where an anchor was found. The year of loss is given as the 7th or 8th year of Elizabeth I reign (beginning 17 November 1565 to 1567).

=== 1567 ===
- La Concepción (Spain): Out of Havana, she ran aground on the island of São Miguel, in the Azores. Some of her cargo was salvaged.

=== 1568 ===
- Unnamed (Scotland): The ship was wrecked on the coast of the Netherlands with the loss of eighteen lives.

=== 1570 ===
- Victoria (Spain): The first ship to circumnavigate the globe (1519-1522), the carrack foundered on a voyage from Seville to the Antilles with the loss of all hands.

== 1571–1580 ==
=== 1573 ===
- (First report) John (England): Wrecked on the Pole Sand at Exmouth, Devon with pilot John Parsons aboard. The Lympstone ship was heading for Exeter from Newfoundland with 70,000 salt fish (known as Newfoundland fish). The ship broke up and 18,000 fish were lost, to the value of £200 "... by his (the pilot) craft, fault, ignorance, rashness and negligence caused the ship to strike the sands and rocks of the sea".
- 17 April — Unnamed ship (Habsburg Netherlands): The unknown sloop-of-war may have been one of the ships sunk during the Battle of Flushing.
- April — (Spain): During the Eighty Years' War a number of Spanish warships were lost in a battle with the Dutch fleet, when attempting to break a blockade on Middelburg.

=== 1578 ===
- 30 September — Marigold (England): The sloop was wrecked in the Strait of Magellan, possibly near Desolación Island while on an expedition, led by Francis Drake, to attack Spanish ports.
- the Emanuel of Bridgewater, sank on the western side of Smerwick harbour, Ireland with a cargo of rocks from the Countess of Sussex mine on Baffin Island. The ship was one of Martin Frobisher's fleet, and the cargo was believed to be gold ore.
- late 1578 or early 1579; San Juanillo (Spain) A Manila galleon beached at Baja California, subsequently destroyed by a hurricane and debris spread on the beach for miles.

=== 1579 ===
- 29 October — Iveglia (Spain): The three-masted carrack ran aground on reefs near Porto Pidocchio. Iveglia, carrying artillery and textiles, was stopped from entering the harbour at Camogli, Genoa because of an infectious disease in the port; some of the ship's crew were saved.

=== 1580 ===
- 24 January — Santa Catalina (Spain): The Spanish Navy carrack (nau) was wrecked on São Miguel Island, in the Azores while part of the Indies fleet.

== 1581–1590 ==
=== 1583 ===
- 29 August — Delight (Royal Navy): Ran aground on Sable Island, approximately 175 km (109 mi) south-east of the closest point of mainland Nova Scotia. All the crew drowned bar sixteen men who spent seven days in a small boat before reaching Newfoundland. The ship was part of an expedition led by Humphrey Gilbert.
- 9 September — Squirrel (Royal Navy): The frigate foundered near the Azores. She was previously part of the expedition led by Sir Humphrey Gilbert to Newfoundland.
- October — Catalina (Spain): The nau ran aground on the island of São Miguel at Vila Franca, Azores.
- 28 December - Ann Francis (England): Wrecked at Margam in Wales on the way back from delivering a cargo of wheat to Spain.

=== 1584 ===
- 26 January — Louvois Blanc The barque was lost on the French coast opposite Île de Ré.
- February — Trinidad (Spain): The carrack (nau) was in poor condition and deliberately ran aground near Cape Virgenes, Argentina. Trinidad was one of a twenty-three strong expedition, led by Pedro Sarmiento de Gamboa, to colonise the Strait of Megellan. Items from the ship were used to equip the colony of Nombre de Jesus, Argentina.

=== 1585 ===
- 19 August — Santiago ( Portugal): Wrecked on the south-western part of Bassas da India, an atoll in the southern Mozambique Channel. An astrolabe was recovered along with jewels and silver coins when the wreck was discovered in 1977.
- Unknown date — Dolphin (flag unknown): The ship was wrecked on the Goodwin Sands, Kent, England.

=== 1587 ===
- 8 June — São Filipe ( Portugal): The nau was heading for India when she was wrecked on São Miguel in the Azores.
- Unknown date — Santiago ( Portugal): The galleon sank while moored at Angra, Terceira Island, Azores. She was out of Malacca, Malaysia.

=== 1588 ===
==== July ====
- 30 July — Bazana (Spain): Part of the Spanish fleet sent to invade England, a storm in the Bay of Biscay sent four of the smaller galleons, including Bazana, to shelter in French ports. They returned to Spain after repairs. In one version Bazana ran aground on the shoal Esclaves, near Bayonne.
- 30 or 31 July or 15 November — San Salvador (Spain): Said to have been wrecked off Chesil Beach, Dorset in July, or sank in Studland Bay while en route to Portsmouth in November.

==== August ====
- 6 August — São Mateus ( Portugal): Part of the twelve strong Portuguese squadron of the armada, São Mateus ran aground between Nieuport and Ostend.
- 7 August — Santa Maria Rata Encoronada (Spain): Part of the ten strong Squadron of Levant and part of the armada, the nau may have sunk after colliding with the Galeasse San Lorenzo off Erria, Ireland. Alternatively she grounded and was set alight in late September 1588 in Blacksod Bay, Co Mayo, Ireland.
- 8 August — São Filipe ( Portugal): Part of the twelve strong Portuguese squadron of the armada, São Filipe ran aground between Nieuport and Ostend.
- 8 August — San Juan (Spain): Part of the fourteen strong Squadron of Biscay and part of the armada, the nau was wrecked at Dunkirk, France.
- 8 August — San Lorenzo (Spain): Part of the fourteen strong Squadron of Galleasses of Naples and part of the armada, the galleasse collided with the Santa Maria Rata y Coronada and was stranded in Calais.
- 10 August — Maria Juan (Spain): Part of the fourteen strong Squadron of Biscay and part of the armada, the nau was damaged during the Battle of Gravelines and sank two days later.
- Unknown date — Capitania ( Portugal): Part of the twelve strong Squadron of Galleys of Portugal and part of the armada, Capitania foundered off Bayonne in the Bay of Biscay.

==== September ====
- 1 September — Barca de Amburgo (Spain): Part of the twenty-three strong Squadron of Urcas (Hulks) and part of the armada, the sailing ship sank during a storm south-west of Fair Isle, Scotland. Her crew were taken aboard El Gran Grifon and La Trinidad Valencera; both were later wrecked.
- 4 September — Castillo Negro (Spain): Part of the twenty-three strong Squadron of Urcas (Hulks) and part of the armada, the sailing ship foundered off Donegal, Ireland.
- 15 September — La Trinidad Valencera (Spain): Part of the sixteen strong Castile squadron of the armada, she ran aground at Kinnagoe Bay, Ireland.
- 15 September — San Nicolás (Sveti Nikola) (Spain): Part of the ten strong Squadron of Levant, the carrack was wrecked during a storm off Toorglass, Ireland.
- 15 September — São Marcos ( Portugal): Part of the twelve strong Portuguese squadron of the armada, she was wrecked on the coast of County Clare, Ireland.
- 20 September — Anunciada (Spain): Part of the ten strong Levant squadron of the armada, she was anchored in the mouth of the River Shannon at Scattery Roads and was burnt and abandoned by her crew who were rescued by other armada ships.
- 20 September — San Esteban (Spain): Part of the fourteen strong Squadron of Guipuzcoa and part of the armada, near the mouth of the Doonbeg River, western Ireland. The survivors were either killed as they reached the shore or later hung.
- 21 September — Santiago (Spain): Part of the twenty-three strong Squadron of Urcas and part of the armada, she ran aground near Mosterhamn in Hardanger Fjord, Norway.
- 21 September — Santa Maria de la Rosa (Spain): Part of the fourteen strong Squadron of Guipuzcoa and part of the armada, she was wrecked on Stromboli Reef at Blasket Sound, Ireland. There was only one survivor out of 297 on board.
- 22 September — Ciervo Volante (Spain): Part of the twenty-three strong Squadron of Urcas (Hulks) and part of the armada, she was wrecked off the west Irish coast while attempting to return to Spain.
- 22 September — Gran Grin (Spain): Part of the fourteen strong Squadron of Biscay and part of the armada, the nau was partially burnt in the English Channel and finally sank south of County Clare, Ireland.
- 25 September — Concepción de Juanes del Cano (Spain): Part of the fourteen strong Squadron of Biscay and part of the Armada, the nau sank during a storm at Spanish Point, Ireland.
- 25 September — Falcón Blanco Menor (Spain): Part of the twenty-three strong Squadron of Urcas (Hulks) and part of the armada, sank during a storm off the island of Freaghillaun, Galway, Ireland.
- 25 September — Juliana (Spain): Part of the ten strong Squadron of Levant, the nau was lost near Spanish Point between Streedagh Point and Black Rock, Ireland.
- 25 September — La Lavia (Spain): Part of the ten strong Levant squadron of the armada, she was grounded near Streedagh Strand, ten miles north of the town of Sligo and near to Spanish Point.
- 25 September — San Juan Bautista (Spain): Part of the sixteen strong Castile squadron of the armada, she was lost at Streedagh Strand, Ireland, near Spanish Point.
- 25 September — Santa Maria de Visión (de Biscione) (Spain): Part of the ten strong Levant squadron of the armada, the nau was lost at Streedagh Strand, Ireland.
- 26 September — Duquesa Santa Ana (Spain): Part of the ten strong Andalusia squadron of the armada, the nau was wrecked at Loughros Mor Bay, County Donegal with the loss of 223 lives.
- 28 September — El Gran Grifón (Spain): Flagship of the twenty-three strong Squadron of Urcas (Hulks) and part of the armada, went ashore in the cove of Stroms Heelor on Fair Isle, Scotland. Her three hundred sailors spent six weeks on the island and the wreck was discovered in 1970.

==== October ====
- 27 October (or 26 October) — Girona (Spain): Part of the four strong Squadron of Galleasses of Naples and part of the Armada, wrecked at Lacada Point, County Antrim, Ireland. There may have been as many as 1,295 casualties due to survivors from Santa Maria Rata Encoronada and Duquesa Santa Ana.
- 28 October — San Pedro Mayor (Spain): One of two hospital ships or hulks which followed the Spanish Armada. She navigated the British Isles and was driven into the English Channel, and went ashore at Hope Cove, Bigbury Bay, Devon.
- Unknown date — Doncella (Spain): Part of the ten strong Squadron of Guipuzcoa and part of the Armada, the hulk foundered when she returned to Santander, Spain.

==== Unknown date ====
- Florida (Spain): The ship was wrecked at Tobermory, Isle of Mull, Scotland.
- Maria de Aguirre (Spain): Part of the fourteen strong Squadron of Biscay and part of the Armada, the patache wrecked.
- San Antonio de Padua (Spain): Part of the sixteen strong Squadron of Castile and part of the Armada, the patache sank off the west coast of Ireland.
- St. Catherine (Spain): The ship was wrecked near Slains Castle, Aberdeenshire, Scotland.
- Unidentified wreck: A wreck in Mullion Cove, Cornwall may be the Santo Christo de Castello. The 1589 or 1590 wreck (see below) may refer to this wreck.

=== 1589 ===
- 30 October — Nuestra Señora de Guia (Spain): The carrack lost her cargo when she foundered near the south coast of Terceira in the Azores.
- 8 December — Ragusana (Regazona) (Spain): Flagship of the ten strong Squadron of Levant and part of the armada, the nau sank at the harbour entrance on her return to A Coruña.

=== 1589 or 1590 ===
- Unknown date — Unidentified small galleon: Captured on the Spanish Main in the summer of 1589 by George Clifford, the Earl of Cumberland, and sent home as a "prize" the following winter. Under the command of Christopher Lister and with a cargo of looted silver, she was lost with all hands in a gale near Penzance, Cornwall.

== 1591–1600 ==
=== 1591 ===
- 2 April — Espiritu Sanctu (Spain): The nau foundered in the Azores between the islands Terceira and Flores.
- 9 July — Santa Cruz (Portugal): Out of India, the carrick was burnt by the English at Flores, one of the islands of the Azores.
- 30 August — Assunción (Spain): The galleon sank off Flores, in the Azores, during the Battle of Flores against an English privateer, Revenge.
- 31 August — La Serena (Spain): Sank in a storm following the Battle of Flores.

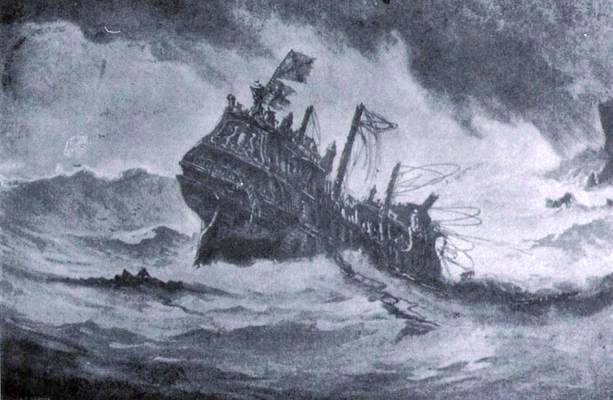
Revenge

- 31 August — Revenge (England): Captured during the Battle of Flores, but later wrecked during a storm on the reefs of Serreta, Terceira, Azores. Both the Spanish crew and English prisoners lost their lives.
- 30 September — San Medel y Celedón (Spain): The carrack was wrecked during a storm near Formigas Islets, in the Azores.
- 30 September — Vegoña (Spain): Part of an expedition led by Sancho Pardo the nau sank during a storm near the Azores.
- 30 September — Whiite Duyve (Dutch Republic): Fifteen survived when the flute sank during a storm off Terceira Island, Azores.
- September — Santa Maria del Puerto (Spain): The nau sank in the Azores, 2 nautical miles (3.7 km) south of Terceira.
- Unknown Spanish galleon (Spain): A galleon with a cargo of gold and silver is said to have sunk the Irish Sea off Ardglass.

=== 1592 ===
- 2 October — Black (England): The pinnace sank while under tow by Dainty near Cape Pilar, Chile. She was part of the five ship Thomas Cavendish expedition to China.
- 15 October — St. Peter (Dutch Republic): The ship was wrecked on the Goodwin Sands, Kent, England.
- 17 December — Golden Lion (Dutch Republic): The East Indiaman was wrecked on the Goodwin Sands.
- 17 December — Red Lion (England: The ship was wrecked on the Goodwin Sands.
- unknown date — Makeshift (England): pinnace-yacht, sank off Alderney Channel Islands. Artifacts from this wreck is featured in the Alderney Museum and is managed by the Alderney Maritime Trust.

=== 1593 ===
- 24 March — Santo Alberto (Portugal): The carrack, out of Cochin, India, sank off the Cape of Good Hope during a storm.
- 18 October Tobie (England): Merchant ship out of London, ran aground near Cape Spartel.
- unknown date — Nossa Senhora da Nazaré (Portugal): The carrack, out of Cochin, India, sprang a leak and was beached on the coast of Mozambique. The crew were rescued by Chagas.
- unknown date — La Encarnación (Spain): The carrick foundered off São Miguel Island, Azores.

=== 1594 ===
- 13 June — Cinco Chagas (Portugal): Anglo-Spanish War, Action of Faial: The nau caught fire and sank after a battle against three English privateers off Faial Island, Azores. The thirteen survivors (out of four hundred) were captured by the English.
- 24 July — Madre de Deus (Portugal): Out of India the nau ran aground on Flores in the Azores.

=== 1595 ===
- 17 July — Santa Magharita (Spain): The galleon was lost off Florida.
- 2 August — John and two other ships (England): Sank during a Spanish raid in Mount's Bay, Cornwall.
- 7 September — Santa Ysabel (Spain): The galleon was the flagship of a fleet of four ships, led by Álvaro de Mendaña de Neira, in an attempt to colonise the Solomon Islands. Santa Ysabel disappeared while passing the erupting island of Tinakula, part of the Santa Cruz Islands.
- 23 November — Magdalena (Spain): The frigate was lost during a battle against an English fleet attempting to capture San Juan de Puerto Rico.
- November — San Agustin (Spain): The Spanish Manila galleon under the command of Portuguese Sebastião Rodrigues Soromenho (Sebastián Rodríguez Cermeño in Spanish) was lost at Drakes Bay, California, when a storm blew in from the south and the ship dragged anchor. Most of the crew was on land constructing a small boat for coastal exploration. The crew successfully returned to Mexico in the small boat.
- 19 December — San Felipe (Spain): The galiot sank off the Philippines while returning to Spain from the Solomon Islands following a failed attempt to colonise those islands.
- 19 December — Santa Catalina (Spain): The frigate sank off the Philippines while returning to Spain from the Solomon Islands following a failed attempt to colonise those islands.

=== 1596 ===
- 1 January — Chancellor: Ran aground off Cape Breton Island, Canada.
- 19 October — San Felipe (Spain): The Manila galleon was wrecked on Shikoku, Japan. Her crew survived.
- November — San Pedro (Spain): The cargo ship was wrecked near Bermuda while on a voyage from Cartagena to Cádiz, Spain.
- 28 December — Anunciada (Portugal): The cargo ship ran aground near Cabo Toriñana, Spain.

=== 1597 ===
- 11 January — Amsterdam (Dutch Republic): The Vereenigde Oostindische Compagnie (VOC) cargo ship was set on fire, in the Java Sea, near the island of Bawean.
- February — San Bartolomé (Spain): The Spanish Fleet of Indies galleon was lost on the Isles of Scilly. She was carrying lead ingots and fragments of bronze bells.
- 17 November — São Francisco (Portugal): The carrack (nau) ran aground and was then burned by the English on the island of São Miguel, Azores.

=== 1598 ===
- 16 December — An estimated two hundred ships sank during the Battle of Noryang in the Noryang Strait, off the coast of Namhae Island, South Korea.

=== 1600 ===
- 14 March — Henry Frederick (Dutch Republic): Part of an expedition to open a spice route between Asia and Europe, and led by Admiral Oliver van Noort, the sailing ship went missing in the Strait of Magellan.
- late September — Hoop (Dutch Republic): The Vereenigde Oostindische Compagnie (VOC) frigate, in the service of the Magellaanse Compagnie, was lost along with approximately 130 people, in the Pacific Ocean during a storm. She was heading for Japan having left Hawaii on the 24 September.

== See also ==
- Spanish Armada in Ireland
