= Robert Sténuit =

Belgian journalist, writer and underwater archeologist (1933–2024)

Robert Pierre André Sténuit (16 July 1933 – 9 December 2024) was a Belgian journalist, writer, and underwater archeologist. In 1962, he spent 24 hours on the floor of the Mediterranean Sea in the submersible "Link Cylinder" developed by Edwin Link, thus becoming the world's first aquanaut.

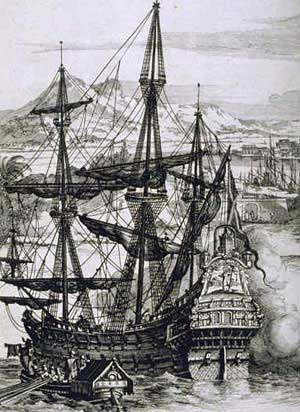
Spanish galleon

== Life and career ==
Sténuit was born in Brussels on 16 July 1933. He began caving at the age of seventeen. He discovered diving in 1953 when he began scuba diving in flooded caves in Belgium. He subsequently became interested in speleology and went on to spend many years exploring the Caves of Han-sur-Lesse.

Sténuit had a passion for history. At the age of 20, after reading 600 Milliards Sous les Mers by Harry Reiseberg, a work of fiction about shipwrecks and treasure diving, Sténuit left the Free University of Brussels, where he was studying political and diplomatic science in preparation for a career as a lawyer. In 1954, Sténuit began looking for the treasures of the Spanish fleet sunk in 1702 at the Battle of Vigo Bay by English and Dutch warships. He searched without success, finding only modern wrecks.

Together with another underwater treasure hunter, the American John Potter, Sténuit worked for the Atlantic Salvage Company, Ltd. on the specially-equipped vessel Dios Te Guarde for search and recovery of underwater treasure, beginning another search for the wrecks of the 1702 Plate Fleet, which lasted two years.

Robert Sténuit worked as a professional diver for the French company SOGETRAM (Société Générale de Travaux Maritimes et Fluviaux). Eventually, he left SOGETRAM to become the chief diver for Edwin Link's Man in Sea project.

Sténuit died on 9 December 2024, at the age of 91.

== Man in Sea project ==
From 6–10 September 1962, Sténuit participated in Man in Sea, Edwin Link's first experiment with an underwater habitat, which was performed with a submersible decompression chamber (SDC) at Villefranche-sur-Mer on the Mediterranean, at a depth of 200 feet (61 m). While submerged in the cylinder, Sténuit breathed a helium-oxygen mixture (Heliox). The experiment was conducted from Link's yacht, the Sea Diver. Sténuit remained on the sea floor for over 24 hours, becoming the world's first aquanaut.

During this dive, a mistral sank the Reef Diver, the Sea Diver's launch, which was carrying fifteen bottles of helium. A mistral surge also caused the cylinder to float back to the surface, where Sténuit remained safe from decompression sickness because the cylinder was still pressurized. A U.S. Navy boat brought an additional supply of helium during the night of 7–8 September, allowing Sténuit to continue to be supplied with helium while decompressing.

Edwin Link's second Man in Sea experiment was conducted in June–July 1964 in the Berry Islands (a chain in the Bahamas) with Sténuit and Jon Lindbergh, one of the sons of Charles Lindbergh, who made the first solo nonstop flight across the Atlantic. Sténuit and Lindbergh stayed in the SPID habitat (Submersible, Portable, Inflatable Dwelling) for 49 hours underwater at a depth of 432 feet (132 m), breathing a helium-oxygen mixture. Joseph B. MacInnis participated in this dive as a life support specialist. At the end of the two divers' decompression, a Sea Diver crew member and Sténuit's wife, Annie Sténuit, sustained minor injuries when the end of an air tank blew off. Sténuit, who had developed a case of the bends during decompression, still had some lingering symptoms afterwards in his shoulders and ankles, but these eventually dissipated.

In 1965, the Man in Sea project was taken over by a new company, Ocean Systems Inc. Link departed from the project. Still, Sténuit remained as a researcher, adviser and development engineer, conducting test dives in decompression chambers and underwater habitats and computing new helium-oxygen decompression tables for greater depths. In 1966, Ocean Systems established an office in London with Sténuit in charge. His professional work at this time involved drilling on off-shore oil and gas rigs in the North Sea, but in his spare time, he began researching the wreck of the Spanish galleass Girona.

== Underwater archeologist ==
Sténuit became involved with underwater archeology and the search for shipwrecks, collaborating with Henri Delauze (president of COMEX). In 1968, Sténuit created the "Groupe de Recherche Archéologique Sous-Marine Post-Médiévale" (Group for Underwater Post-Medieval Archaeological Research), or "GRASP". GRASP has managed the inventory of 17 merchant shipwrecks and a number of warships from the 16th century through the 19th century.

Sténuit's most important underwater archaeological discoveries are:

- Recovery of underwater treasures of the galleass Girona, part of the Invincible Armada (1967).
- Slot ter Hooge, a Dutch East Indiaman carrying a large quantity of gold and silver coins and bullion, which wrecked in 1724 near the Madeira Islands (1975).
- The Witte Leeuw wreck, part of a convoy carrying spices and Ming porcelain (1977).

Robert Sténuit is the author of several books on diving and underwater archeology, which have been translated into several languages. He remained an active seeker of underwater treasures' location and identification, especially in wrecks of ships that belonged to the various East India companies. He continued to direct GRASP alongside his daughter, archeologist Marie-Eve Sténuit.

== Books ==
- Ces mondes secrets où j'ai plongé (These secret worlds where I dived) – Robert Laffont
- L'or noir sous les flots bleus (The black gold in the blue waters) – Dargaud
- Histoire des pieds lourds (History of heavy feet) – Musée du scaphandre
- Les épaves de l'or (The wrecks of gold) – Gallimard
- Dauphin mon cousin (The dolphin, cousin to man) – Le Livre de Poche
- La plongée sous-marine, vacances chez Neptune (Scuba diving, holidays with Neptune) – Dargaud
- Le livre des trésors perdus (The book of lost treasures) – Famot
- Les trésors de l'Armada (Treasures of the Armada) – Albin Michel
- Les jours les plus profonds (The deepest days) – Plon
- L'or à la tonne: l'exploitation des trésors engloutis (The gold per tonne: exploitation of sunken treasure) – Glénat
- La flûte engloutie (The sunken flute) – Plon
- Merveilleux monde souterrain (Caves and the marvellous world beneath us) – Librairie Hachette

== See also ==
- List of ships of the Spanish Armada
- Underwater archeology – Study of human activity via evidence found underwater
- Underwater habitat – Human habitable underwater enclosure filled with breathable gas
- Wreck diving – Recreational diving on wrecks
