= List of ships of the Spanish Armada =

The Spanish Armada was the fleet that attempted to escort an army from Flanders as a part the Habsburg Spanish invasion of England in 1588, was divided into ten "squadrons" (escuadras) The twenty galleons in the Squadrons of Portugal and of Castile, together with one more galleon in the Squadron of Andalucia and the four galleasses from Naples, constituted the only purpose-built warships (apart from the four galleys, which proved ineffective in the Atlantic waters and soon departed for safety in French ports); the rest of the Armada comprised armed merchantmen (mostly naos/carracks) and various ancillary vessels including urcas (storeships, termed "hulks"), zabras and pataches, pinnaces, and (not included in the formal count) caravels. The division into squadrons was for administrative purposes only; upon sailing, the Armada could not keep to a formal order, and most ships sailed independently from the rest of their squadron. Each squadron was led by a flagship (capitana) and a "vice-flagship" (almiranta).
This list is compiled by a survey drawn up by Medina Sidonia on the Armada's departure from Lisbon on 9 May 1588 and sent to Felipe II; it was then published and quickly became available to the English. The numbers of sailors and soldiers mentioned below are as given in the same survey and thus also relate to this date.

== List of Squadron Commanders ==
- Alonso Pérez de Guzmán, 7th Duke of Medina Sidonia, commander of the Squadron of Portugal and of the whole enterprise
- Diego Flores de Valdés, commander of the Squadron of Castile
- Hugo de Moncada i Gralla, commander of the Squadron of Galleasses of Naples
- Juan Martínez de Recalde, commander of the Squadron of Biscay
- Pedro de Valdés, commander of the Squadron of Andalusia
- Miguel de Oquendo, commander of the Squadron of Guipuzcoa
- Martín de Bertendona, commander of the Squadron of Levantines
- Juan Gómez de Medina, commander of the Squadron of Hulks or Urcas
- Antonio Hurtado de Mendoza, commander of the Squadron of Communication (he died during the voyage to England, and was succeeded by Agustín de Ojeda)
- Diego de Medrano, commander of the Squadron of Galleys of Portugal (known as the São João Galleys), becoming interim Admiral on the Armada's return to Spain following the death of Admiral Miguel de Oquendo

These commanders did not necessarily sail in the capitana (flagship) of the squadron of which they were technically in command. For example, Juan Martínez de Recalde, as second-in-command of the whole enterprise, was aboard Medina Sidonia's flagship São Martinho (or San Martin in Spanish), which also carried the Duke's principal staff officers - Diego Flores de Valdés (chief advisor on naval matters) and Francisco Arias de Bobadilla (the general in charge of the fleet's military contingent). In view of this, in the event of the loss of the fleet flagship with its commanders aboard, it was determined by Felipe II that command of the enterprise would then devolve upon Alonso Martínez de Leiva, who commanded the Rata Santa María Encoronada of the Squadron of Levantines.

== Ships of the Squadrons ==
=== Squadron of Portugal ===
Twelve ships comprising ten galleons and two zabras (total seamen 1,293; total soldiers 3,330);

- São Martinho (48 guns). Known in Spanish as San Martin and in English as Saint Martin. Flagship of the commander-in-chief (Fleet Capitana), the Duke of Medina Sidonia and Maestre Francisco Arias de Bobadilla, the senior army officer. (São Martinho had an overall length of about 180 feet (55 m) with a beam of about 40 feet (12 m). She carried the aforementioned 48 heavy guns on two enclosed gun decks, plus multiple smaller weapons).
- São João (de Portugal) 4 Galleys commanded by Captain Diego de Medrano: Capitana, Princesa, Diana, and Bazana (50 guns each), known in Spanish as the galleys of San Juan de Portugal and in English as Saint John of Portugal.
- Vice-flagship (Fleet Almiranta). Captained by Recalde (captain of this ship later in the expedition).
- São Marcos (33 guns).
- São Filipe (40 guns).
- São Luis (38 guns).
- São Mateus (34 guns). Known in Spanish as San Mateo and in English as Saint Matthew.
- Santiago (24 guns).
- Florencia (52 guns). The Tuscan-built galleon San Francisco (São Francisco in Portuguese) was appropriated, renamed and integrated within the squadron of Portuguese galleons. Older Portuguese galleons like the São Lucas and the São Rafael had already been withdrawn from service; one was still in the squadron at Lisbon, but was too small and too rotted to accompany the Squadron), and she was substituted by the Florencia.

Name	Type	Tons	Built at	Year built	No of guns	Crew	Troops	Fate
São Martinho (Sp. San Martín)	galleon	1,000	Portugal	1578	48	161	317	Returned to Santander
São João (Sp. San Juan)	galleon	1,050	Portugal	1586	50	156	387	Returned to A Coruña, subsequently burned there by Sir Francis Drake in May 1589
São Marcos (Sp. San Marcos)	galleon	790	Portugal	1585	33	108	274	Wrecked on the coast of County Clare, Ireland.
São Luís (Sp. San Luis)	galleon	830	Portugal	1585	38	100	339	Returned to Santander
São Filipe (Sp. San Felipe)	galleon	800	Portugal	1585	40	108	362	Ran aground and lost off Flanders, between Nieuport and Ostend.
São Mateus (Sp. San Mateo)	galleon	750	Portugal	1579	34	110	286	Ran aground and lost off Flanders, between Nieuport and Ostend.
São Tiago (Sp. Santiago)	galleon	520	Portugal	1585	24	80	293	Returned to Santander
São Francisco (Sp. San Francisco de Florencia)	galleon	961	Tuscany	1585	52	89	294	Returned to Santander
São Cristóvão (Sp. San Cristóbal)	galleon	352	Portugal	1580	20	79	132	Returned to Santander
São Bernardo (Sp. San Bernardo)	galleon	352	Cantabria	1586	21	65	171	Returned to A Coruña
Augusta	zabra	166	Cantabria	1585	13	43	49	unknown
Julia	Zabra	166	Cantabria	1585	14	48	87	unknown

=== Squadron of Castile ===
Sixteen ships comprising ten galleons, four armed merchant carracks (naos) and two pataches (total seamen 1,719; total soldiers 2,458); seven of the galleons were built as a class at Guarnizo in 1583–83.

- San Cristobal (36 guns). Flagship of Diego Flores de Valdés (who served as chief-of-staff to Medina Sidonia aboard the São Martinho throughout the campaign, and did not set foot aboard the San Cristobal during the campaign).
- San Juan Bautista (24 guns). Vice-flagship.
- San Pedro (24 guns).
- San Juan (24 guns).
- Santiago el Mayor (24 guns).
- San Felipe y Santiago (24 guns).
- Asunción (24 guns).
- Nuestra Señora del Barrio (24 guns).
- San Medel y Celedon (24 guns).
- Santa Ana (24 guns).
- Nuestra Señora de Begoña (nao).
- La Trinidad Bogitar (nao).
- La Santa Catalina (nao).
- San Juan Bautista (nao).
- Patache Nuestra Señora del Socorro (or Nuestra Señora del Rosario). (14 guns).
- Patache San Antonio de Padua (12 guns).

Name	Type	Tons	Built at	Year built	No of guns	Crew	Troops	Fate
San Cristóbal	galleon	700	Santander	1583	36	116	202	Returned to Laredo
San Juan Bautista	galleon	750	Santander	1585	24	90	244	Returned to Santander
San Juan (el Menor)	galleon	530	Guarnizo	1584	24	77	231	Returned to Santander
San Pedro (el Mayor)	galleon	530	Guarnizo	1584	24	90	184	Returned to Santander
Santiago el Mayor	galleon	530	Guarnizo	1584	24	103	290	Returned to Santander
San Felipe y Santiago	galleon	530	Guarnizo	1584	24	75	204	Returned to Santander
Asunción	galleon	530	Guarnizo	1584	24	70	170	Returned to Santander
Nuestra Señora del Barrio	galleon	530	Guarnizo	1583	24	81	202	Returned to Laredo
San Medel y Celedón	galleon	530	Guarnizo	1584	24	75	200	Returned to Laredo
Santa Ana	galleon	250	France	1581	24	54	98	Returned to Santander
Nuestra Señora de Begoña	nao	750	Santander	1585	24	81	202	Returned to Cangas (Galicia)
Trinidad	nao	872	Santander	1586	24	79	173	Lost off the coast of Desmond — probably at Valentia Island, off the coast of south Kerry Ireland
Santa Catalina	nao	882	Santander	1586	24	134	193	Returned to Santander
San Juan Bautista	nao	650	Santander	1585	24	57	183	Returned to Santander on 7 October 1588
Nuestra Señora del Socorro (or Nuestra Señora del Rosario)	patache	75	Santander	1586	14	15	20	Possibly lost in Tralee Bay, County Kerry, Ireland.
San Antonio de Padua	patache	75	Santander	1586	12	20	20	Sank off the west coast of Ireland

=== Squadron of Galleasses of Naples ===
Four ships (galleasses); the flagship (capitana) of Don Hugo de Moncada was the San Lorenzo; when she was captured by the French at Calais after a hard fight with the English, Moncada died from a bullet wound.

These powerfully-armed vessels were built for the Neapolitan Navy (probably in Sicily) a decade earlier. Each had 28 oars on each side, but relied on a square-rigged sailing arrangement installed for the 1588 campaign, as they were slow under oars alone. Their armament consisted on six forward-firing heavy cannon in the bows and four similar guns rear-firing in the stern; they also had 20 smaller guns (4- to 12-pounders) mounted in the fore and stern castles, and 20 swivel-mounted light guns on the raised catwalks above the rowers' benches.

- San Lorenzo (50 guns). Grounded at Calais after the Battle of Gravelines. Captured by the French after a hard fight with the English that cost Don Hugo de Moncada his life.
- Zúñiga (50 guns). Forced to take refuge at Le Havre after suffering rudder damage while trying to return home. It is unclear whether Zúñiga ever returned home. It was last reported silted up at Le Havre after an unsuccessful effort to sail home.
- Girona (50 guns). Wrecked 30 October 1588 at Lacada Point, County Antrim, Ireland. There may have been as many as 1,295 casualties due to the Girona carrying survivors from Santa Maria Rata Encoronada and Duquesa Santa Ana.
- Napolitana (50 guns).

Name	No of Guns	Built at	Year built	Tons	Crew	Oarsmen	Soldiers	Fate
San Lorenzo	50	Naples	1578	380	124	300	248	Grounded at Calais after the Battle of Gravelines.
Zúñiga	50	Naples	1578	380	104	300	226	Returned to Le Havre, where abandoned
Girona	50	Naples	1580	380	129	300	229	Lost driven on to Lacada Point and the "Spanish Rocks'" (as they were known, thereafter) near Ballintoy in County Antrim, Ireland on the night of 26 October 1588.
Napolitana	50	Naples	1581	380	102	300	221	Returned home intact, making landfall at Laredo, Spain.

=== Squadron of Viscaya (Biscay) ===
Fourteen ships comprising ten naos and four pataches (total seamen 863; total soldiers 1,937);

- Santa Ana (30 guns: Flagship of Juan Martinez de Recalde, Captain General and second in command of the Armada). Commanded by Nicolas de Isla.
- El Gran Grin (28 guns: Vice-flagship). Commanded by Pedro de Mendoza.
- Santiago (25 guns).
- La Concepción de Zubelzu. (16 guns).
- La Concepción de Juan del Cano (18 guns).
- La Magdalena (18 guns).
- San Juan (21 guns).
- La María Juan (24 guns).
- La Manuela (24 guns).
- Santa María de Montemayor (18 guns).
- Patache La María de Aguirre (6 guns).
- Patache La Isabela (10 guns).
- Patache de Miguel de Suso (6 guns).
- Patache San Esteban (6 guns).

Name	Type	Tons	Built at	Year built	No of guns	Crew	Troops	Fate
Santa Ana	nao	768	Cantabria	1586	30	101	311	Lost off Le Havre
Gran Grin	nao	1,160	Cantabria	unknown	28	75	261	Wrecked near southwest tip of Clare Island, Clew Bay, County Mayo, Ireland.
Santiago	nao	666	Cantabria	1585	25	106	204	Returned to Guipuzcoa
Concepcion de Zubelzu	nao	468	Pasajes	1585	16	58	161	Returned to Guipuzcoa
Concepcion de Juan del Cano	nao	418	Cantabria	1585	18	58	167	Wrecked on Carna, County Galway, Ireland.
Magdalena	nao	530	Cantabria	1585	18	61	183	Returned to Guipuzcoa
San Juan	nao	350	Cantabria	1585	21	49	141	Wrecked at Dunkirk, France.
María Juan	nao	665	Cantabria	1585	24	94	207	Damaged during the Battle of Gravelines and sank two days later.
Manuela	nao	520	England (i.e. a prize)		12	48	124	Returned to Santander
Santa María de Montemayor	nao	707	Ragusa		18	47	158	Returned to Santander
María de Aguirre	patache	70	Cantabria	1585	6	25	19	unknown
Isabela	patache	71	Cantabria	1585	10	29	24	Returned to A Coruña
María de Miguel Suso	patache	96	Cantabria	1585	6	25	20	Returned to Guipuzcoa
San Esteban	patache	78	Cantabria	1585	6	25	10	Returned to A Coruña

=== Squadron of Andalusia ===
Eleven ships comprising nine naos, one galleon and one patache (total seamen 780; total soldiers 2,325);

- Nuestra Señora del Rosario (46 guns). Flagship of Don Pedro de Valdés.
- San Francisco (21 guns). Vice-flagship.
- San Juan Bautista (31 guns).
- San Juan de Gargarín (16 guns).
- La Concepción (20 guns).
- Duquesa Santa Ana (23 guns).
- Santa Catalina (23 guns).
- La Trinidad (13 guns).
- Santa María del Juncal (20 guns).
- San Bartolomé (20 guns).
- Patache El Espíritu Santo (32 guns).

Name	Type	Tons	Built at	Year built	No of guns	Crew	Troops	Fate
Nuestra Señora del Rosario	nao	1,150	Ribadeo	1585	46	119	345	Captured by Drake in the Channel, sent into Torbay
San Francisco	nao	915	Cantabria	1585	21	85	227	Returned to Santander
San Juan Bautista	galleon	810	Cantabria	1584	31	84	249	Returned to Santander
San Juan de Gargarín	nao	569	Cantabria	1585	16	38	175	Returned to Santander
Concepción	nao	862	Cantabria	1584	20	69	201	Returned to Laredo
Duquesa Santa Ana	nao	900	Flanders	1585	23	65	253	Wrecked at Loughros More, County Donegal, Ireland.
Santa Catalina	nao	730	Cantabria	1585	23	69	238	unknown
Trinidad	nao	650	Cantabria	1585	13	54	198	unknown
Santa María de Juncal	nao	730	Cantabria	1586	20	66	219	unknown
San Bartolomé	nao	976	Cantabria	1585	27	56	211	unknown
Espíritu Santo	patache	70	Cantabria	1585	10	15	18	Scuttled at Portencross, 6 August 1588

=== Squadron of Guipúzcoa ===
Fourteen ships comprising ten naos and four pataches (total seamen 616; total soldiers 1,992);

- Santa Ana (47 guns). Flagship of Miguel de Oquendo.
- Santa Maria de la Rosa (or Nuestra Señora de la Rosa). (47 guns). Vice-flagship.
- San Salvador (25 guns).
- San Esteban (26 guns).
- Santa María (or Santa Marta). (20 guns).
- Santa Barbara (12 guns).
- San Buenaventura (21 guns).
- La María San Juan (12 guns).
- Santa Cruz (18 guns).
- Doncella (16 guns).
- Patache La Asunción (9 guns).
- Patache San Bernabé (9 guns).
- Pinaza Nuestra Señora de Guadalupe (1 gun).
- Pinaza Magdalena (1 gun).

Name	Type	Tons	Built at	Year built	No of guns	Crew	Troops	Fate
Santa Ana	nao	1,200	Cantabria	1586	47	97	341	Lost at San Sebastian
Nuestra Señora de la Rosa (or Santa María de la Rosa)	nao	956	Cantabria	1587	26	85	238	Wrecked on Stromboli Reef at Blasket Sound, Ireland, 21 September 1588.
San Salvador	nao	958	Cantabria	1586	25	90	281	Captured in the Channel, taken into Weymouth
San Esteban	nao	936	Cantabria	1586	26	73	204	Wrecked near Doonbeg River, County Clare, Ireland.
Santa Marta (or Santa María)	nao	548	San Sebastian	1586	20	73	183	Returned to Guipúzcoa.
Santa Bárbara	nao	525	Cantabria	1586	12	54	161	Returned to Guipúzcoa
San Buenaventura	nao	379	Cantabria	1586	21	54	154	Returned to Guipúzcoa
María San Juan	nao	291	Cantabria	1586	12	40	154	Returned to Lisbon
Santa Cruz	nao	680	Genoa	1551	18	40	127	Returned to Santander
Doncella	nao	500	Germany	1586	16	29	112	foundered when she returned to Santander
Asunción	patache	60	Cantabria	1586	9	16	18	Returned to Guipúzcoa
San Bernabé	patache	69	Cantabria	1586	9	17	17	Returned to San Sebastian
Nuestra Señora de Guadalupe	pinnace	50	Cantabria	1586	1	12	0	unknown
Magdalena	pinnace	50	Cantabria	1586	1	14	0	unknown

=== Squadron of Levantines ===
Ten Mediterranean merchant carracks (naos) embargoed in Sicily and in Lisbon (total seamen 767; total soldiers 2,780);

- La Regazona (30 guns). Venetian merchantman. Flagship of Martín de Bertendona.
- La Lavia (25 guns). Venetian merchantman. Vice-flagship.
- Santa María (La Rata Encoronada) (35 guns). Genoese merchantman.
- San Juan de Sicilia (26 guns). Ragusan merchantman.
- La Trinidad Valencera (42 guns). Venetian merchantman.
- Presveta Anunciada (24 guns). Ragusan merchantman.
- San Nicolás Prodaneli (26 guns). Ragusan merchantman.
- Juliana (32 guns). Catalan merchantman.
- Santa María de Visón (de Biscione) (18 guns). Ragusan merchantman.
- La Trinidad de Escala (22 guns). Genoese merchantman.

Name	Type	Tons	Built at	Year built	No of guns	Crew	Troops	Fate
Regazona	nao	1,294	Ragusa, Sicily	unknown	30	80	333	Returned to A Coruña very damaged, subsequently burned there by Sir Francis Drake in May 1589
Lavia	nao	728	Venice	unknown	25	71	271	Grounded near Streedagh Strand, ten miles North of Sligo town, Ireland.
Santa María / (Rata Encoronada)	nao	820	Genoa	unknown	35	93	344	Grounded and set alight, late September 1588 in Blacksod Bay, County Mayo, Ireland.
San Juan de Sicilia	nao	800	Ragusa	unknown	26	63	279	Vessel carrying 300 troops and silver plate for the use of noblemen was wrecked or run aground on the coast of Islay or Mull. Lachlan sent news of the ship to James VI at Stirling Castle. Lachlan Mòr befriended the crew and borrowed two cannon and 100 soldiers to besiege the house of Angus MacAulay, leaving a hostage as a pledge. After this, a man called John Smallet set a fuse made of lint in the gunpowder store and blew the ship up in Tobermory harbour, Isle of Mull, Scotland.In October 1588 he gathered a force including 100 Spanish soldiers against Clan MacDonald of Clanranald and raided the Isles of Canna, Rùm, Eigg, and "Elennole", and besieged Mingary Castle, the stronghold of Clan MacDonald of Ardnamurchan.
Trinidad Valencera	nao	1,100	Venice	1586	42	75	338	Wrecked, 16 September 1588 at Glenagivney, Kinnagoe Bay Inishowen, County Donegal, Ireland.
Presveta Anunciada	nao	703	Ragusa	unknown	24	80	200	Anchored in the mouth of the River Shannon at Scattery Roads, Ireland, and was burnt and abandoned by her crew who were rescued by other Armada ships.
San Nicolás Prodaneli	nao	834	Ragusa	unknown	26	68	226	Anchored in the mouth of the River Shannon at Scattery Roads, Ireland, and was burnt and abandoned by her crew who were rescued by other Armada ships.
Juliana	nao	860	Genoa	unknown	32	65	290	Grounded near Streedagh Strand, ten miles North of Sligo town, Ireland.
Santa María de Visón	nao	666	Ragusa	unknown	18	38	183	Grounded near Streedagh Strand, ten miles North of Sligo town, Ireland.
Trinidad de Escala	nao	900	Genoa	unknown	22	66	342	Returned to Spain (Santander) very damaged and was unrigged.
San Bautista de la Esperanza (omitted from most censuses)	nao	300	Castro Urdiales, Cantabria	unknown	12			Returned to Spain.

=== Squadron of Urcas ===
Twenty three ships (total seamen 608; total soldiers 3,121);

- El Gran Grifón (38 guns). Flagship of Juan Gómez de Medina. Wrecked, 27 September 1588 at Stroms Hellier, Fair Isle, Shetland Islands, Scotland. Her three hundred sailors spent six weeks on the island.
- San Salvador (24 guns). Vice-flagship.
- Perro Marino (7 guns).
- Falcon Blanco Mayor (16 guns).
- Castillo Negro (27 guns). The ship foundered off County Donegal, Ireland.
- Barca de Amburgo (or Barca de Hamburg) (23 guns). The ship sank during a storm south-west of Fair Isle, Scotland. Her crew were taken aboard El Gran Grifon and La Trinidad Valencera; both were later wrecked.
- Casa de Paz Grande (26 guns).
- San Pedro Mayor (29 guns) a crew of 28 mariners and also 113 Soldiers on board, was run aground in Hope Cove, Devon, on 7 November 1588 one of two hospital ships, the ship was a hulk (cargo). The crew walked to safety from the ship, Sir William Courtney looked after the 140 men
- El Sansón (18 guns).
- San Pedro Menor (18 guns).
- Barca de Anzique (or Barca de Danzig) (26 guns).
- Falcon Blanco Mediano (16 guns). Lost on Connemara coast, County Galway, possibly near Inish Boffin, on Freaghillaun Rock?, Ireland.
- San Andrés (14 guns).
- Casa de Paz Chica (15 guns).
- Ciervo Volante (18 guns). She was wrecked off the west Irish coast.
- Paloma Blanca (12 guns).
- La Ventura (4 guns).
- Santa Bárbara (10 guns).
- Santiago (19 guns). Wrecked near Mosterhamn in Hardanger Fjord, south of Bergen, Norway.
- David (7 guns).
- El Gato (9 guns).
- Esayas (4 guns).
- San Gabriel (4 guns). Possibly wrecked near Kinlochbervie in the Scottish Highlands

AS noted in the above lists 9 Spanish Armada vessels fates are listed as "Unknown". 9 unidentified Armada vessels were reported lost off Ireland:
County Donegal:
Five further ships — unidentified — were wrecked on the Donegal coast:

- Two destroyed vessels at Killybegs (Crews later lost in Girona shipwreck)
- one at Mullaghderg:In 1797 a quantity of lead and some brass guns were raised from the wreck of an unknown Armada ship at Mullaghderg in County Donegal.
- Two vessels:One at Rinn a' Chaislean.Two miles further south, in 1853, an anchor was recovered from another unknown Armada wreck.
- The wreck found in 2010 at Burtonport initially identified as a possible Armada-era wreck was confirmed in 2013 as dating from the early 17th century.

County Mayo:
Three vessels lost County Mayo:

- In September 1588 a galleon was wrecked at Tyrawley (modern County Mayo). Tradition has it that another ship was wrecked in the vicinity, near Kid Island, but no record remains of this event. Survivors are reported to have come from a wreck in Broadhaven of another ship, which had entered that bay without masts.

=== Squadron of Communication ===
Twenty two Pataches and Zabras (5 to 10 guns) under Don Antonio Hurtado de Mendoza (total seamen 574; total soldiers 479);

- Nuestra Señora del Pilar de Zaragoza
- La Caridad Inglesa
- San Andrés Escosés (sic) (San Andrés Escocés)
- El Santo Crucifijo
- Nuestra Señora del Puerto
- La Concepción de Carasa
- Nuestra Señora Begoña
- La Concepción Capetillo
- San Jeronimo
- Nuestra Señora de Gracia
- La Concepción Francisco de Latero
- Nuestra Señora de Guadalupe
- San Francisco
- Espiritu Santo
- Trinidad (zabra)
- Nuestra Señora de Castro (zabra)
- Santo Andres
- La Concepción de Valmeseda
- La Concepción de Somanila
- San Juan de Carasa
- Asunción

=== Squadron of São João Galleons of Portugal ===
Squadron of Galleons under Admiral Juan Martínez de Recalde (total rowers 888; no soldiers);

- San Juan de Portugal

=== Miscellaneous Caravels ("Round" caravels and Lateen caravels) ===
- São Lourenço
- Santo António (1ª)
- Nossa Senhora da Conceição (1ª)
- Jesus da Ajuda
- São João
- Santo António (2ª)
- A Conceição (2ª)
- São Jorge
- Nossa Senhora da Assunção
- Conceição (3ª)
- Santo António (3ª)
- Nossa Senhora da Assunção (Nossa Senhora da Conceição (2ª), possibly did not join the expedition beyond A Coruña. Only eleven left Lisbon, and possibly about 9 or 10 (?), after the storm, left A Coruña).

== Complement of the Fleet ==
- 141 ships.
- 8,766 sailors.
- 21,556 soldiers.
- 2,088 convict rowers

== Ship Types ==
=== Galleon ===
- Pronunciation: /ˈɡæliən/ GAL-ee-ən. Etymology: Old Spanish galeón, from Middle French galion, from Old French galie. Date: 1529.

Galleon: A heavy square-rigged sailing ship of the 16th to early 18th centuries used for war or commerce especially by the Spanish. They were the fastest ships built during the 16th century. Galleons were large, multi-decked sailing ships first used as armed cargo carriers. The full body of the fleet took two days to leave port. A typical Spanish galleon was 100–150 feet in length and 40–50 feet wide.

=== Galley ===
- Pronunciation: /ˈɡæli/ GAL-ee. Etymology: Middle English galeie, from Anglo-French galie, galee, ultimately from Middle Greek galea. Date: 13th century.

Galley: A ship or boat propelled solely or chiefly by oars:

1. a long low ship used for war and trading especially in the Mediterranean Sea from the Middle Ages to the 19th century;
2. also : galleass : a warship of classical antiquity — compare bireme, trireme;
3. a large open boat (as a gig) formerly used in England.

=== Galleass ===
- Pronunciation: /ˈɡæliəs/ GAL-ee-əs. Etymology: Middle French galeasse, from Old French galie galley. Date: 1544.

Galleass: A large fast galley used especially as a warship by Mediterranean countries in the 16th and 17th centuries and having both sails and oars but usually propelled chiefly by rowing.

=== Urca ===
- "The urcas, supply hulks, had largely been requisitioned when they sailed into Spanish ports, regardless of their owners' rights and wishes. Baltic made urcas with two lateen mizzen masts were unable to sail close to the wind. They were also no good for fitting fighting 'castles' to. Some urcas came from Hanseatic ports. In all there were twenty three urcas in the fleet."

=== Zabra ===
- Zabras were small or midsized two-masted sailing ships used off the coasts of Spain and Portugal to carry goods by sea from the 13th century until the mid-16th century; they were well-armed to defend themselves against pirates and privateers.

=== Patache ===
- A patache is a type of sailing vessel with two masts, very light and shallow, a sort of cross between a brig and a schooner, which originally was a warship, being intended for surveillance and inspection of the coasts and ports.

=== Pinaza ===
- The pinaza (pinnace) is a light boat, propelled by oars or sails, carried aboard merchant and war vessels to serve as a tender.

=== Caravel ===
- Latin-rigged Caravel (Lateen Caravel), a highly manoeuvrable sailing ship. The lateen sails gave her speed and the capacity for sailing to windward (beating). Caravels were used especially by the Portuguese for the oceanic exploration voyages during the 15th and 16th centuries.

=== Square-rigged caravel (Round caravel) ===
- the Square-rigged caravel is another type of caravel which is a combination of the carrack and the caravel, distinguished from both ships by its combined sails, with four or more masts, usually three with lateen rigged sails and the fore-mast with two square sails, and by its hull design which is narrower and longer (with a sterncastle, forecastle and a galleon design). It is doubtful that the caravels of Portugal in the Spanish Armada - with the assistance mission, support, and transport of provisions and military items - had the size and the heavy weaponry of the other traditional Portuguese large Caravelas de Armada (Square-rigged caravels).

=== Nao (Carrack) ===
- A three- or four-masted ocean-going sailing ships that are developed from the 14th Century to the 17th Century.

== Summary of Armada Make Up ==
- Total Number of Ships Mustered at A Coruña = 137
- Total tons of Shipping at Muster = 58,705
- Total people on ships, soldiers & sailors = 25,826 people
- Total number of Guns = 2,477
- Total Number of Ships Lost/Burned/Missing = to 44
- Total Number that Failed to Start to leave A Coruña = 5

By 5LK

Collecting Data/ Under Construction

== See also ==
- List of shipwrecks in the 16th century
- Spanish Armada in Ireland
- Hugo of Moncada i Gralla

== Bibliography ==
- The Spanish Armada, Colin Martin and Geoffrey Parker, 1988. Guild Publishing, ISBN 9780241121252.
  2nd (revised) edition 1999.
- Hutchinson, Robert (2013). The Spanish Armada. Weidenfeld & Nicolson. ISBN 978-0297866374.
- The Spanish Armada, Roger Whiting, 1988. Sutton Publishing, ISBN 0-7509-3647-9.
- The Spanish Armada, John Tincey, 1988. Osprey Publishing, ISBN 1-84176-028-5.
- Armada, Patrick Williams, 2000. Tempus Publishing, ISBN 0-7524-1778-9.
- Ireland: Graveyard of the Spanish Armada, T. P. Kilfeather. 1967, Anvil Books.
- The Confident Hope of a Miracle, Neil Hanson, 2003. ISBN 0-3856-0451-3.
- The Defeat of the Spanish Armada, Garrett Mattingley, 1959. Jonathan Cape.
- Armada in Ireland, Niall Fallon, 1978. Stamford Maritime.
- Elizabeth's Sea Dogs, Hugh Bicheno, 2012, Conway imprint of Anova Books, ISBN 978-1-84486-214-6.
- The Armada Campaign 1588, Angus Konstam, 2001. Osprey Publishing, ISBN 1-84176-192-3.
  2nd impression 2008.
- Armada 1588-1988, National Maritime Museum, 1988, Penguin Books, ISBN 0-14-010301-5.
