= Hugo of Moncada i Gralla =

Commander of the Galleasses of the Spanish Armada

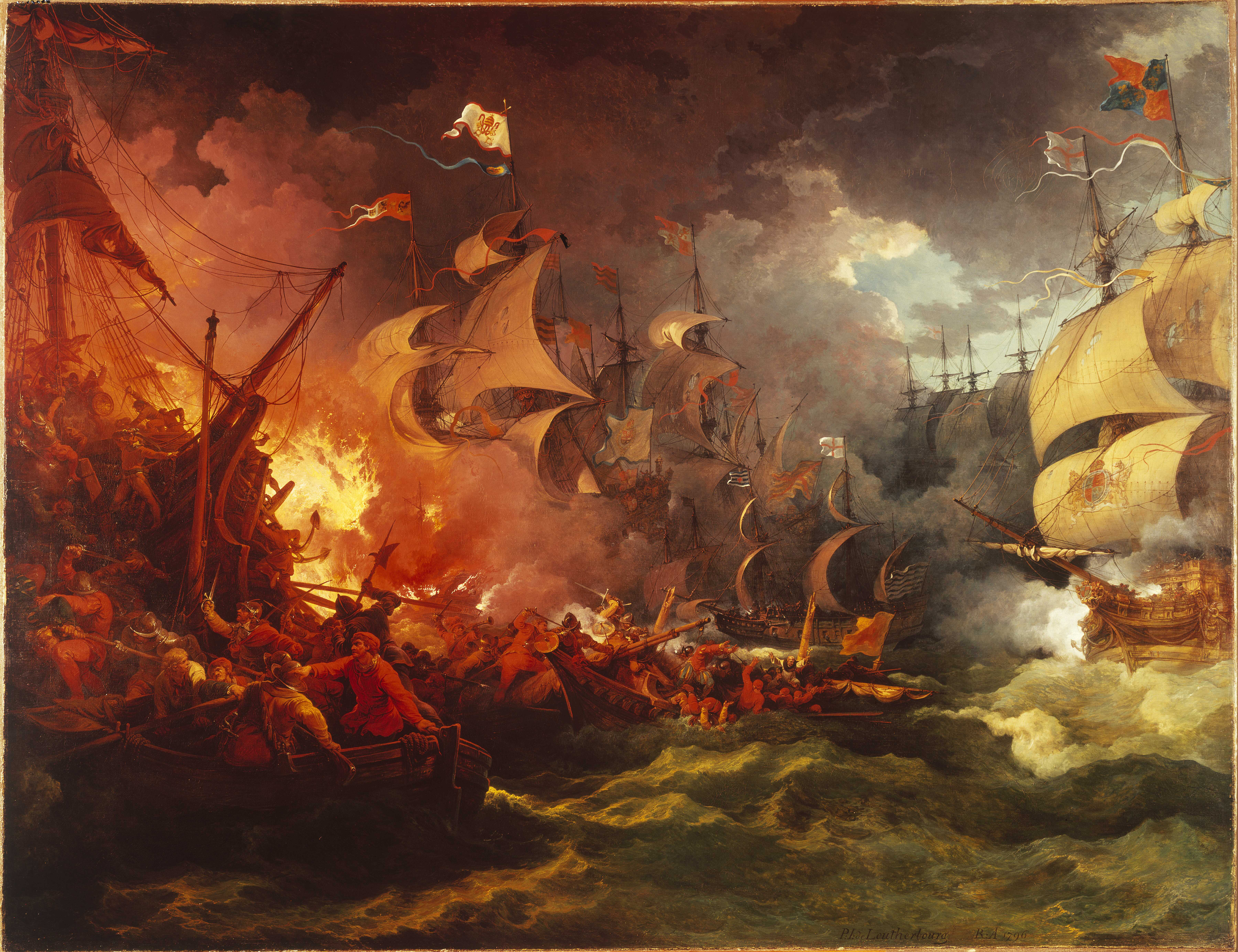
Defeat of the Spanish Armada by Philip James de Loutherbourg, 1796

Hugo of Montcada i Gralla was the commander of the Galleasses of the Spanish Armada. He was the second son of Francesc I de Montcada, first Marquess of Aitona and Count of Osona, and his wife, Lucrècia Gralla.

Belonging to the noble House of Montcada, his brother Gastó of Montcada i Gralla (first-born of 17 children) inherited the immense family fortune. His other brother was Joan of Montcada i Gralla, Archbishop of Tarragona (1613-1622) and Bishop of Barcelona (1610-1612).

== Participation in the Spanish Armada ==
=== Charge ===
Hugo of Montcada was appointed commander of the fleet of Naples. The flagship was the Galleass San Lorenzo. The Galleass-galleon La Girona was part of that fleet. The Galleasses were:

- The San Lorenzo (captain-ship of the fleet of Naples)-Captain Joan Setantí.
- The Zúñiga (patron-ship of the fleet of Naples)-Captain Pere Centelles
- La Girona-Captain Fabrizio Spínola, Genoese.
- La Napolitana-Captain Perrucchio Morán

=== Galleass San Lorenzo ===
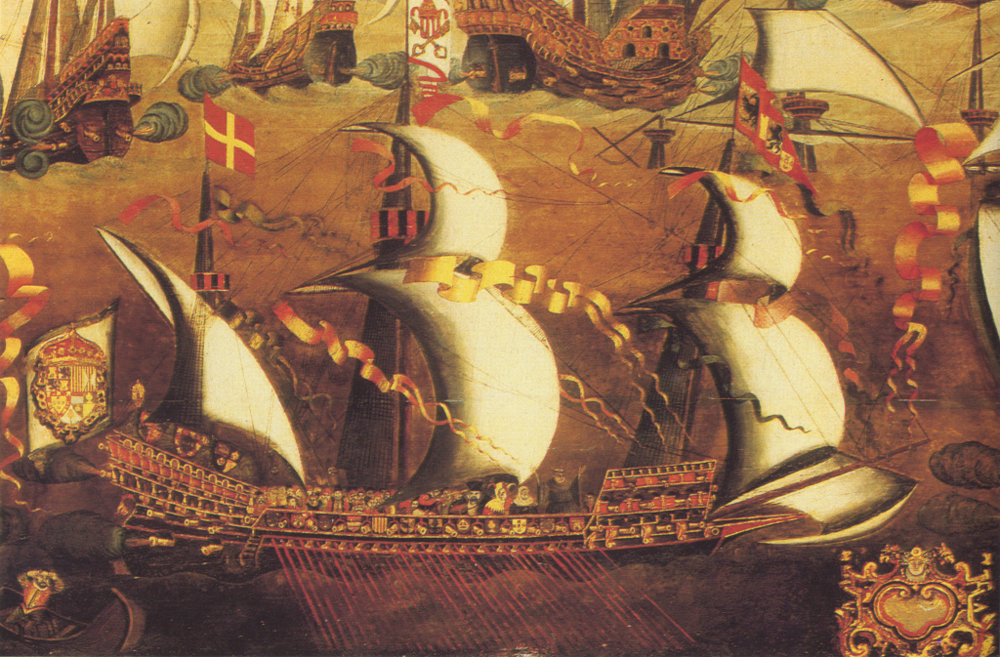
A Galleass of Malta in the Spanish Armada

This ship had 124 sailors, 50 guns, 300 oarsmen and 270 soldiers.

It was built in Naples. It displaced 762 tones and was the largest ship and, according to some, the most splendid of the entire Spanish Armada.

=== Nautical difficulties ===
One of the most difficult variables that made navigating the British Channel so dangerous were (and still are) the currents caused by the tides. Local pilots had good knowledge of those currents.

=== Battle actions ===
- According to various testimonials (documentaries and film documentaries), the Galleass San Lorenzo could not progress rowing against the current caused by the tide.
- Alonso, Duke of Medina Sidonia did not give Hugo of Montcada permission to attack the Ark Royal when she was within his reach and in conditions of superiority.
- The San Lorenzo was the first ship that warned of the danger of the eight ships sent by Francis Drake against the anchored Spanish navy.
- The order of the Duke of Medina Sidonia to cut the chains of the anchors of all the ships of the armada caused chaos and many collisions between them.

=== Final disaster ===
The references to the fact are numerous and not always coincident.

In the confusion brought about by the collisions, a shock rendered unusable the rudder of the San Lorenzo. The maneuver with the oars was not sufficiently agile to fight under the attack of the enemies (from the Ark Royal in particular). Hugo of Montcada decided to go to refuge in the port of Calais (under French control and, in theory, neutral). He did not reach the entrance by sailing or the oars. The galleass tried to enter the port of Calais but bogged down near the entrance and lay half sideways. The soldiers (probably terrified by the incident) deserted the ship, jumping into the water. Many of them drowned. Only a few faithful remained aboard.

The English sent a few boats with soldiers to seize the galleass. Finally Charles Howard sent reinforcements with the Ark Royal's Panescalm boat to reduce the last resistance. Hugo of Montcada was killed with an arquebus shot to his head, and Joan Setantí and other Catalans defenders died as well.

== Important testimonial ==
According to the work "Armada Invencible" by Cesáreo Fernández Duro, there is a description of the final attack and the death of Hugo of Montcada according to the statements of a slave of the Marquis de Santa Cruz (Volume I, page 118, document K.1467, item 18).

== See also ==
- Spanish Armada in Ireland
- List of Ships of the Spanish Armada
