= Spanish ship Nuestra Señora del Rosario (1587) =

Spanish galleon

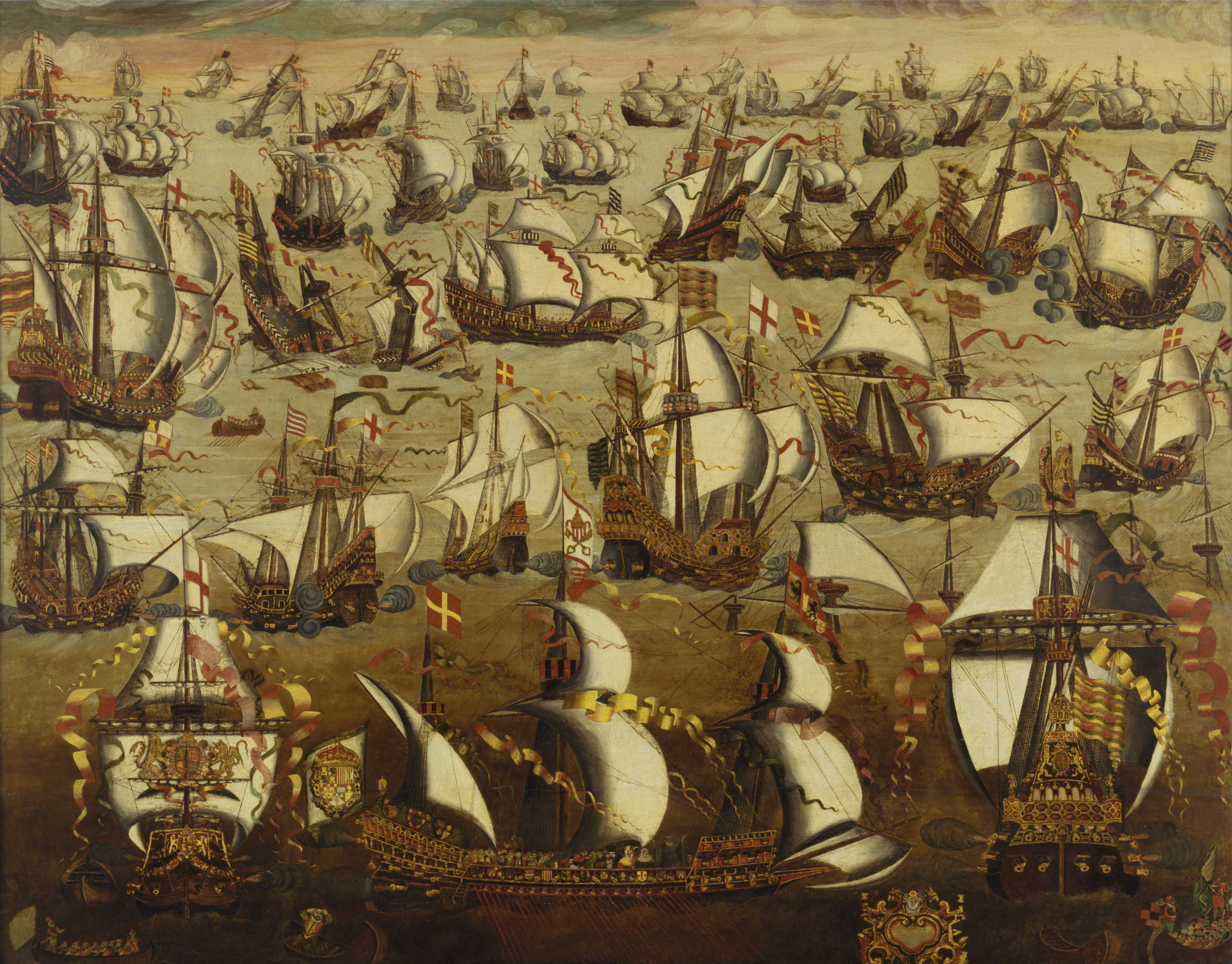
- The Spanish Armada of which Nuestra Señora del Rosario was a part

History

Spanish Empire
- Name: Nuestra Señora del Rosario
- Namesake: Our Lady of the Rosary
- Owner: King Philip II of Spain
- Operator: Spanish Navy
- Route: Armada Real – Corunna
- Builder: Vicente Alvarez, Ribadeo
- Launched: 1587
- In service: 1587–1588
- Out of service: 1 August 1588
- Homeport: Corunna
- Captured: 1 August 1588
- Fate: taken in an action on 1 August 1588 by English warship Revenge in the English Channel.

General characteristics
- Type: Galleon
- Length: 949.45 Tonelas Machos (Burthen) or 1,150 Toneladas (Burthen)
- Propulsion: Sail
- Capacity: 359 men
- Troops: 119 sailors, 240 infantry

Nuestra Señora del Rosario, was a galleon of the Spanish Navy laid down in 1587. She was captured by English forces in 1588.

== Commission and construction ==
The name Nuestra Señora del Rosario translates into English directly as "Our Lady of the Rosary", a religious reference to the Virgin Mary. The names of contemporary Spanish ships commonly had religious undertones as with general Spanish naming traditions of the period.

Nuestra Señora del Rosario was likely commissioned sometime in the mid-1580s though the exact date is unknown and was laid down and constructed at Ribadeo, Lugo, Galicia. She was designed by Spanish shipbuilder Vicente Alvarez. She was launched in 1587 and handed over to the Armada Real at Corunna.

== Service ==
Soon after her construction, Nuestra Señora del Rosario joined the forces gathering for the Spanish Armada in May 1588 under the command of Teniente General Don Pedro de Valdés at Corunna. She was recorded as having been at Corunna on 13 July 1588, and was subsequently damaged in collisions on 31 July 1588.

Nuestra Señora del Rosario entered the English Channel together with the Spanish Armada. She was the flagship of Don Pedro de Valdés who commanded the Escuadura de Andalucia which formed up the second line left flank of the fleet. During the actions of 1 August 1588, the Escuadura de Andalucias together with much of the Spanish center maneuvered to support Santa Ana. It was at this time that Nuestra Señora del Rosario began to drift and was taken off by the current in the opposite direction of the fleet and closer to the English.

On 1 August 1588, Nuestra Señora del Rosario was taken in an action by the English warship Revenge in the English Channel and sent into Torbay. Thereafter, she was brought to Dartmouth and then to Chatham where she was dry docked and eventually sunk to support a wharf.
