= Girona (ship) =

Galeass of the Spanish armada sunk in 1588

Coordinates: 55.2462°N 6.5043°W

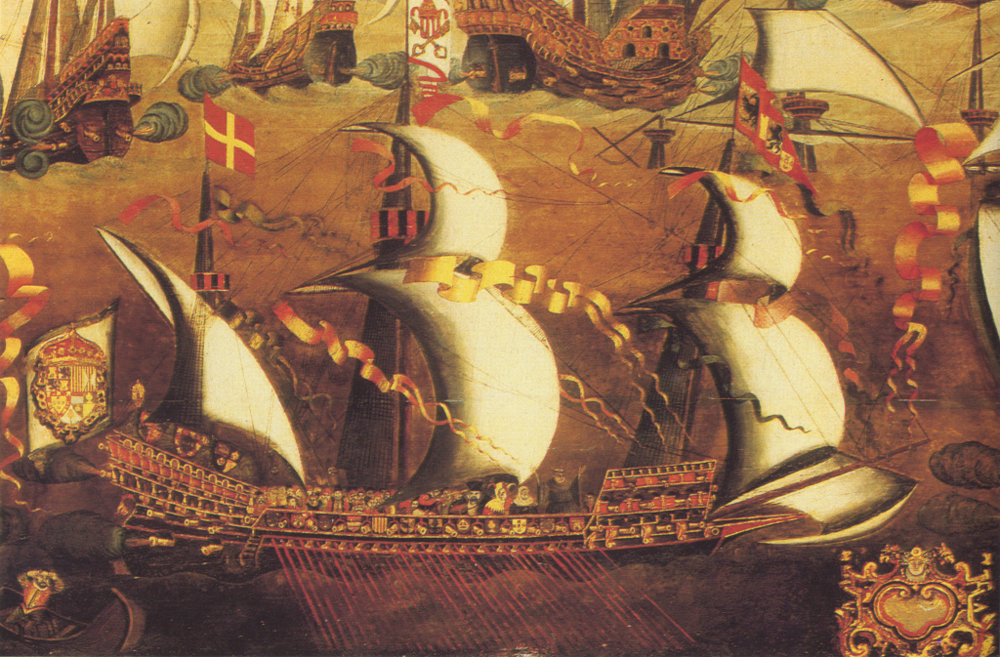
- A depiction of a galleass of the Spanish Armada

History
- Name: La Girona
- Home port: A Coruña
- Fate: Wrecked 26 October 1588

General characteristics
- Class & type: 50-gun galleass
- Capacity: 1,300+ emergency loading
- Troops: 186 transported
- Complement: 531 sailors and rowers
- Armament: 50 bronze and iron cannon
- Notes: over 1,300 aboard, 9 survived
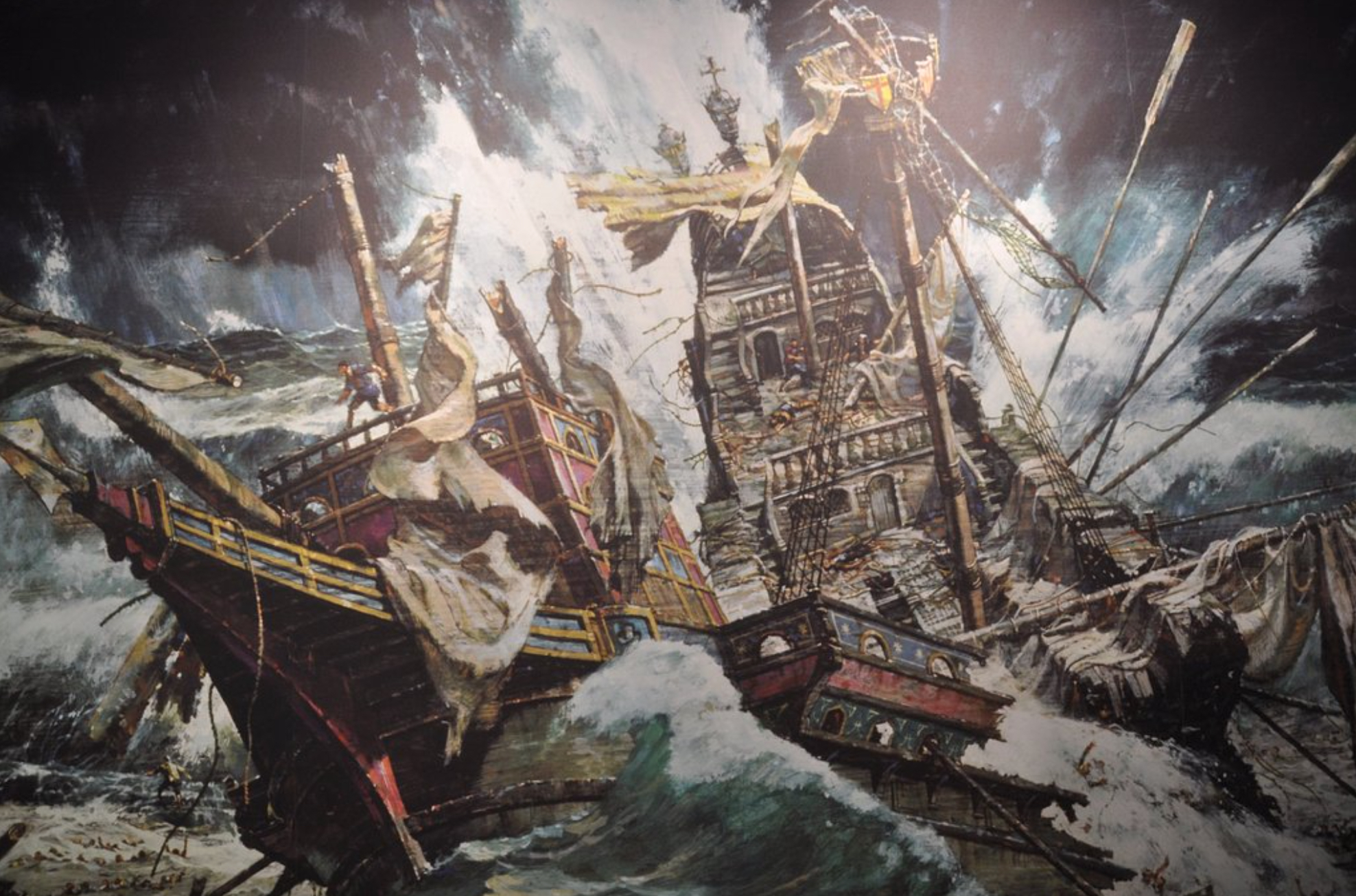
- Wreck of the Girona (Ulster Museum Exhibit Painting)

La Girona was a galleass of the 1588 Spanish Armada that foundered and sank off Lacada Point, County Antrim, on the night of 26 October 1588, after making its way eastward along the north coast of Ulster. The wreck is noteworthy for the great loss of life that resulted and the treasures recovered in the 20th century, now part of the collection of the Ulster Museum.

== Introduction ==
La Girona (/lɑː xɪˈrɔːnɑː/) was named after the Girones family, who at the time had just become Dukes of Osuna and viceroys of Naples (not after Girona, the Catalan name of the city and province of Gerona). Its captain was Hugo de Moncada y Gralla, knight of the Order of Malta.

== Shipwreck ==
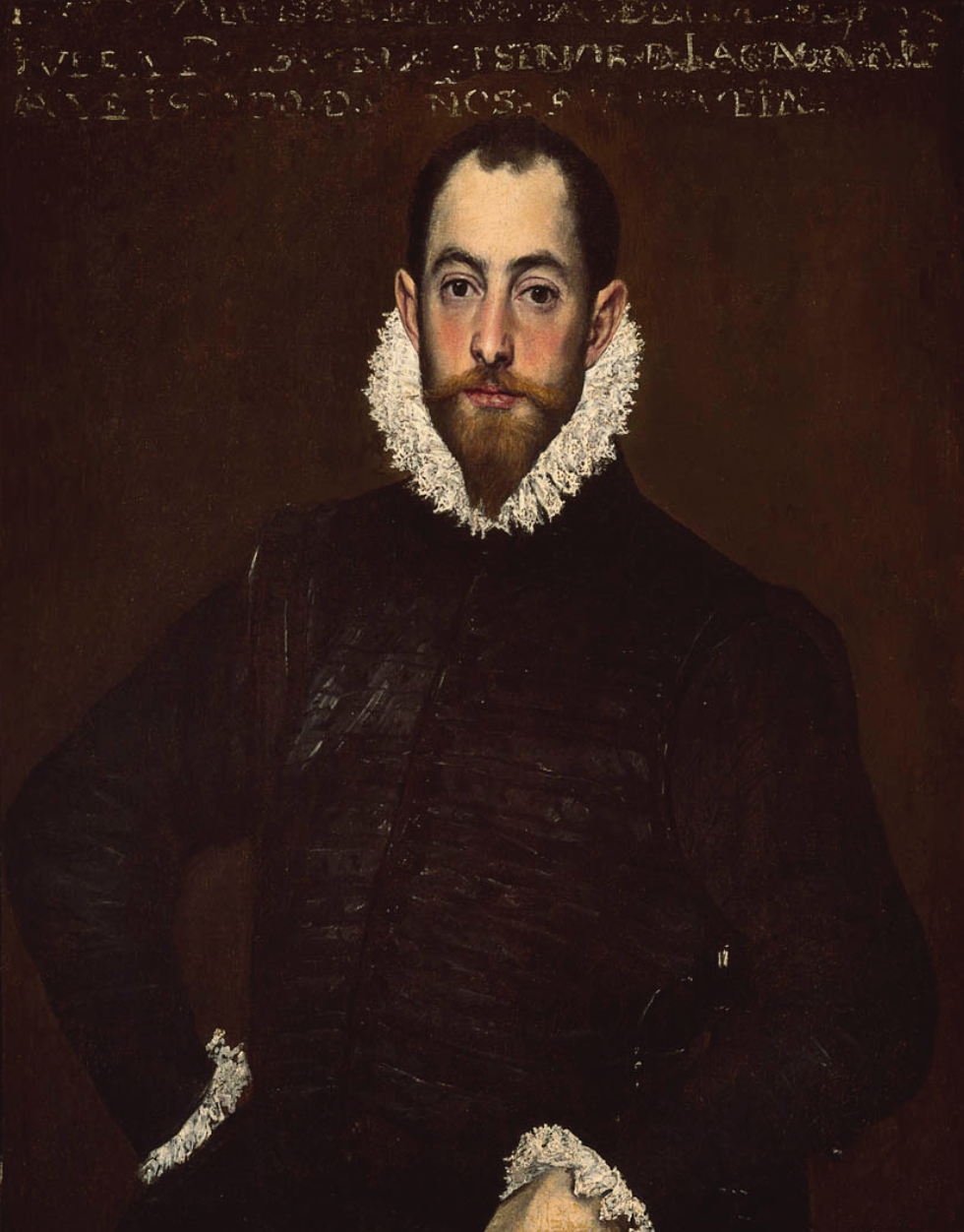
Don Alonso Martinez de Leyva, El Greco c.1580

La Girona had anchored with a damaged rudder in Killybegs Harbour in the south-west of Tír Chonaill, a Gaelic túath that covered most of the then newly established County Donegal in the west of Ulster. With the assistance of an Irish chieftain, MacSweeney Bannagh, she was repaired and set sail for the Kingdom of Scotland on the 25th of October, with 1,300 men on board, including Alonso Martínez de Leiva, knight and trece of the Order of Santiago.

After Lough Foyle was cleared, a gale struck and La Girona was driven on to Lacada Point and the "Spanish Rocks'" (as they were known, thereafter) near Ballintoy in The Route, a territory on the north coast of County Antrim in the north-east of Ulster, on the night of 26 October 1588. Of the estimated 1,300 people on board, nine survived. 260 bodies washed ashore and were buried in a common grave at the local churchyard.

The survivors were sent on to Scotland by the local clan leader, Sorley Boy MacDonnell of Dunluce Castle, which was situated just to the west on the Giant's Causeway cliffs overlooking the coast. From there, MacDonnell is also believed to have conducted the first clandestine salvage efforts on the shipwreck.

== Salvage ==
Between 1967 and April 1968, off the coast of Portballintrae (Port-na-Spaniagh Bay), a team consisting of local diver and historian John MacLennan, alongside a team of Belgian divers (including Robert Sténuit, the world's first aquanaut) located the remains of the wreck and brought up the greatest find of Spanish Armada treasure salvaged up until that time. The underwater site was designated under the Protection of Wrecks Act on 22 April 1993.

== Commemoration ==
The wrecking of La Girona was officially commemorated with a period illustration on the reverse side of sterling banknotes formerly issued by the First Trust Bank in Northern Ireland.

== Ulster Museum Exhibit, Belfast ==
"Treasures from the Girona". Gold and silver coins, jewelry, armaments, and utilitarian objects from the Spanish galleass, Girona, are on permanent display at the Ulster Museum (part of the National Museums of Northern Ireland) in Stranmillis in Belfast. Replicas of the treasures were loaned by the museum and featured in the BBC series The Great Egg Race episode "The Treasure Map" in 1986.

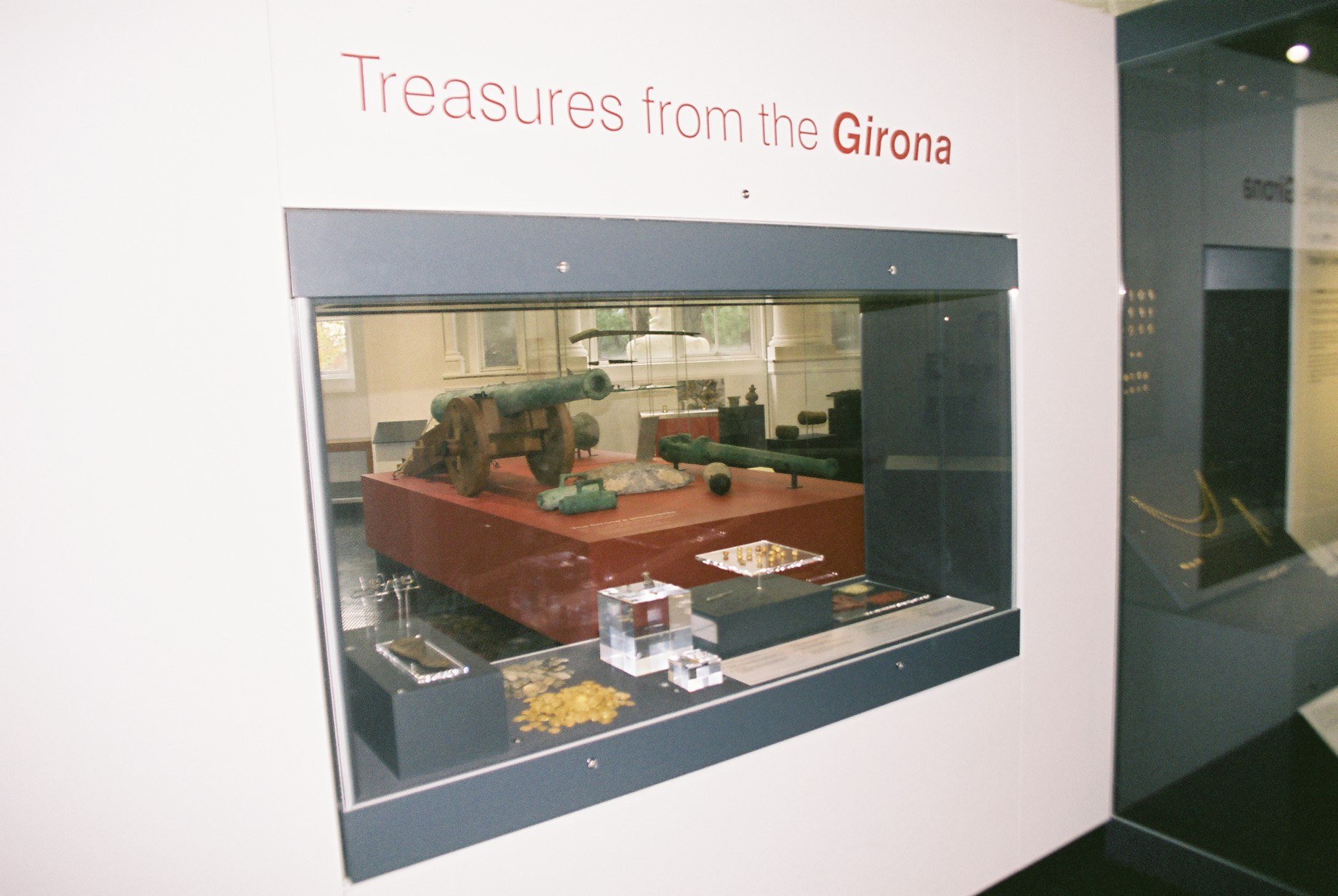
Ulster Museum, Belfast

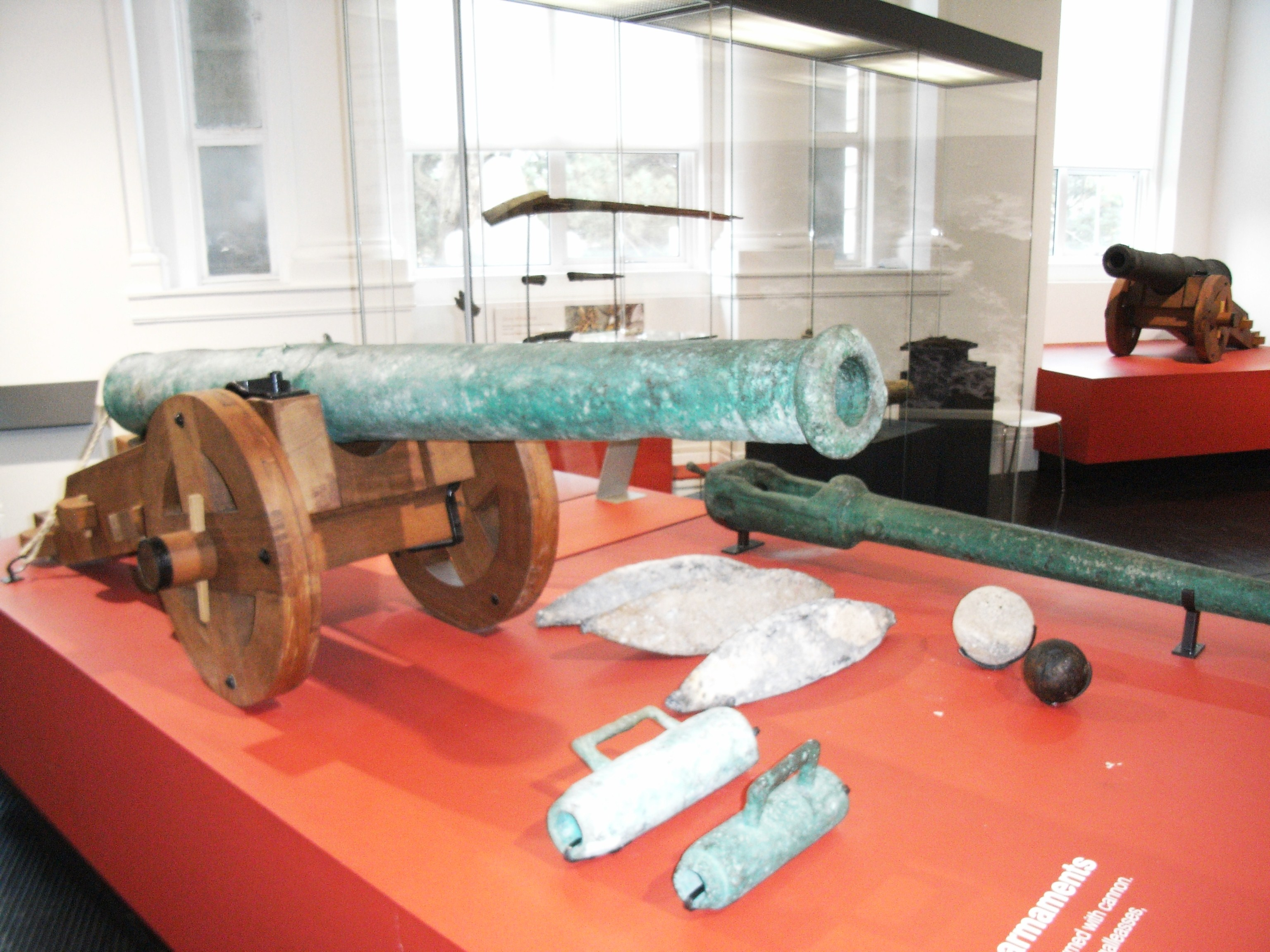
Girona cannons

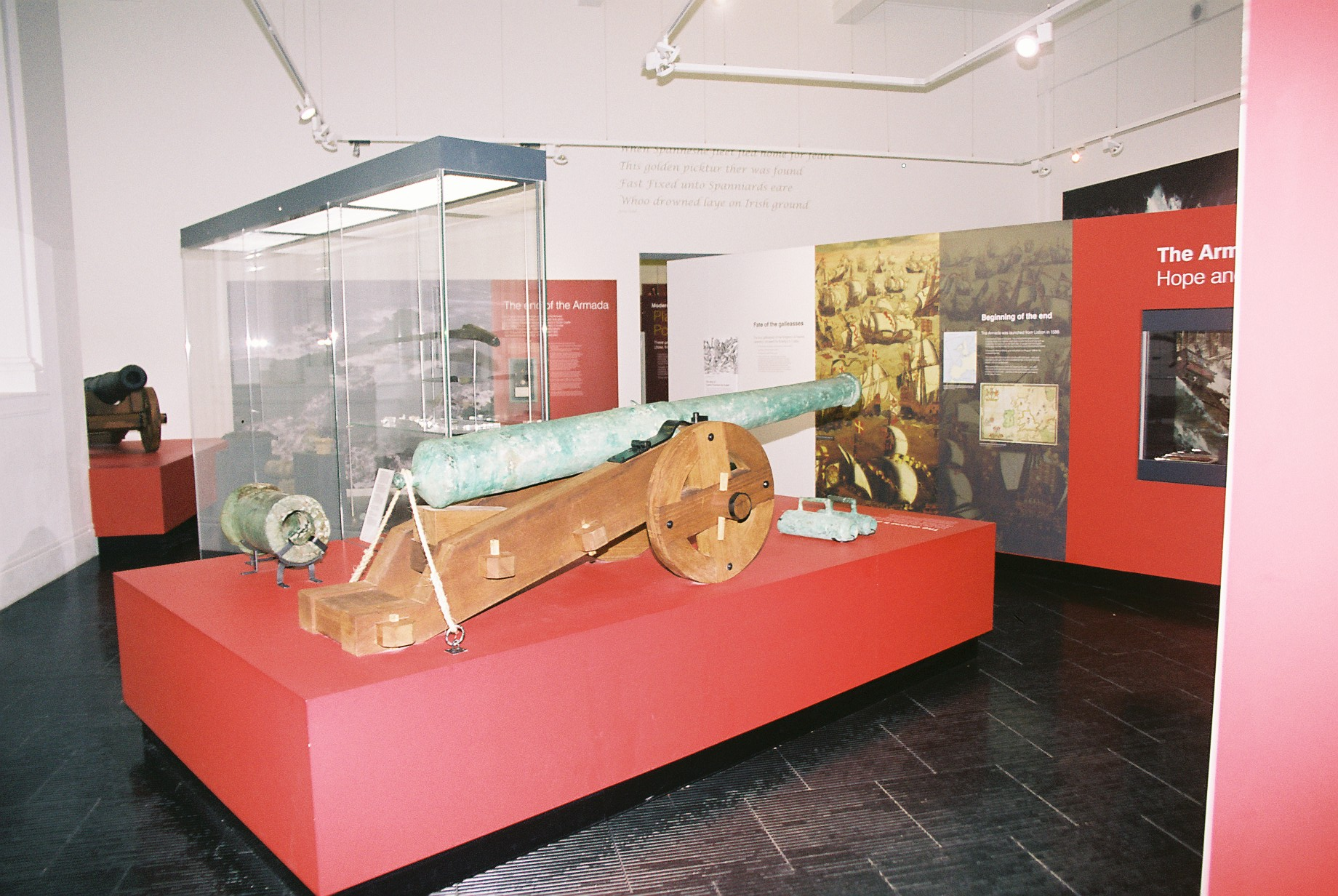
Girona cannon

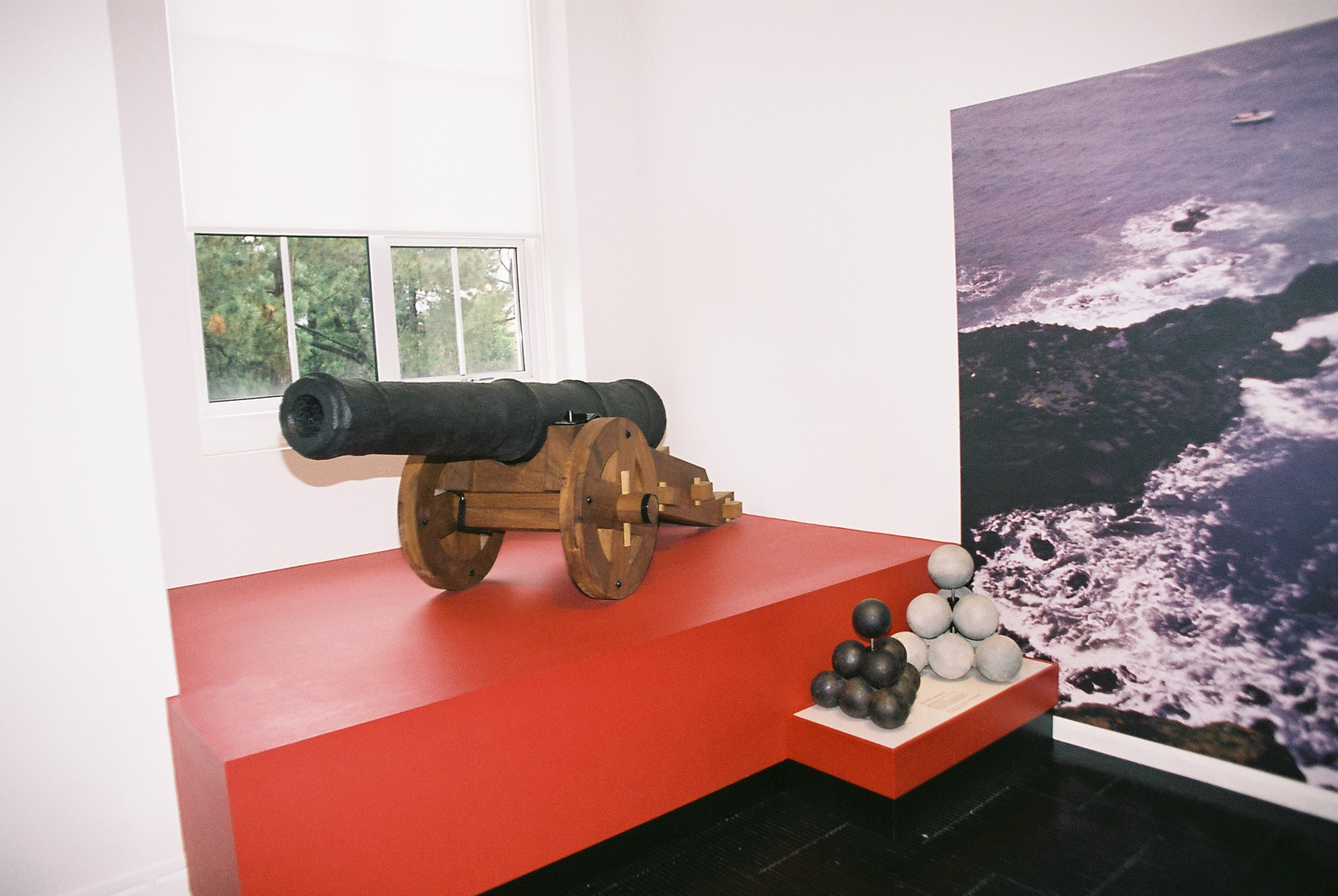
Iron cannon of Duquesa Santa Ana

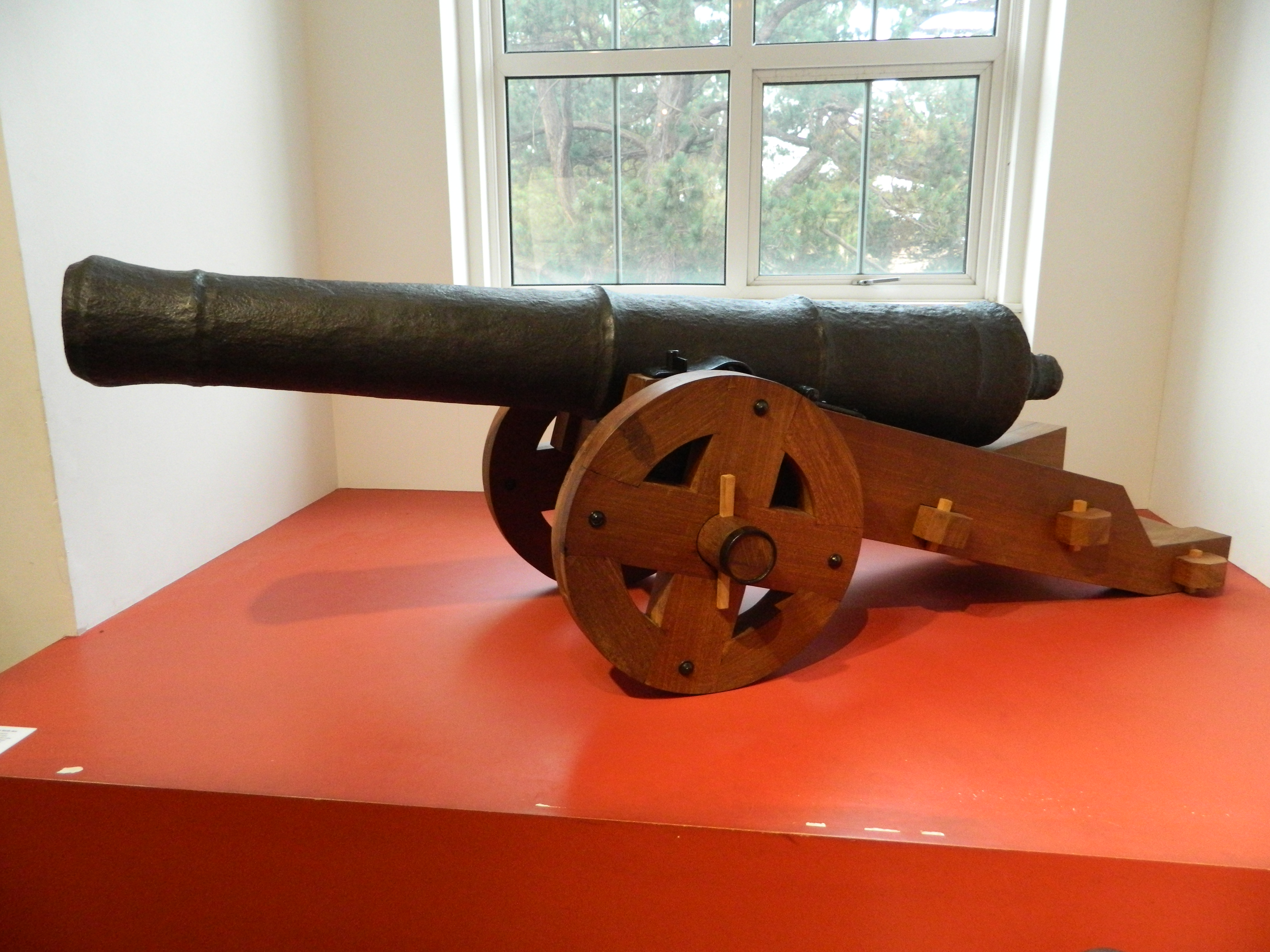
Iron cannon of Duquesa Santa Ana

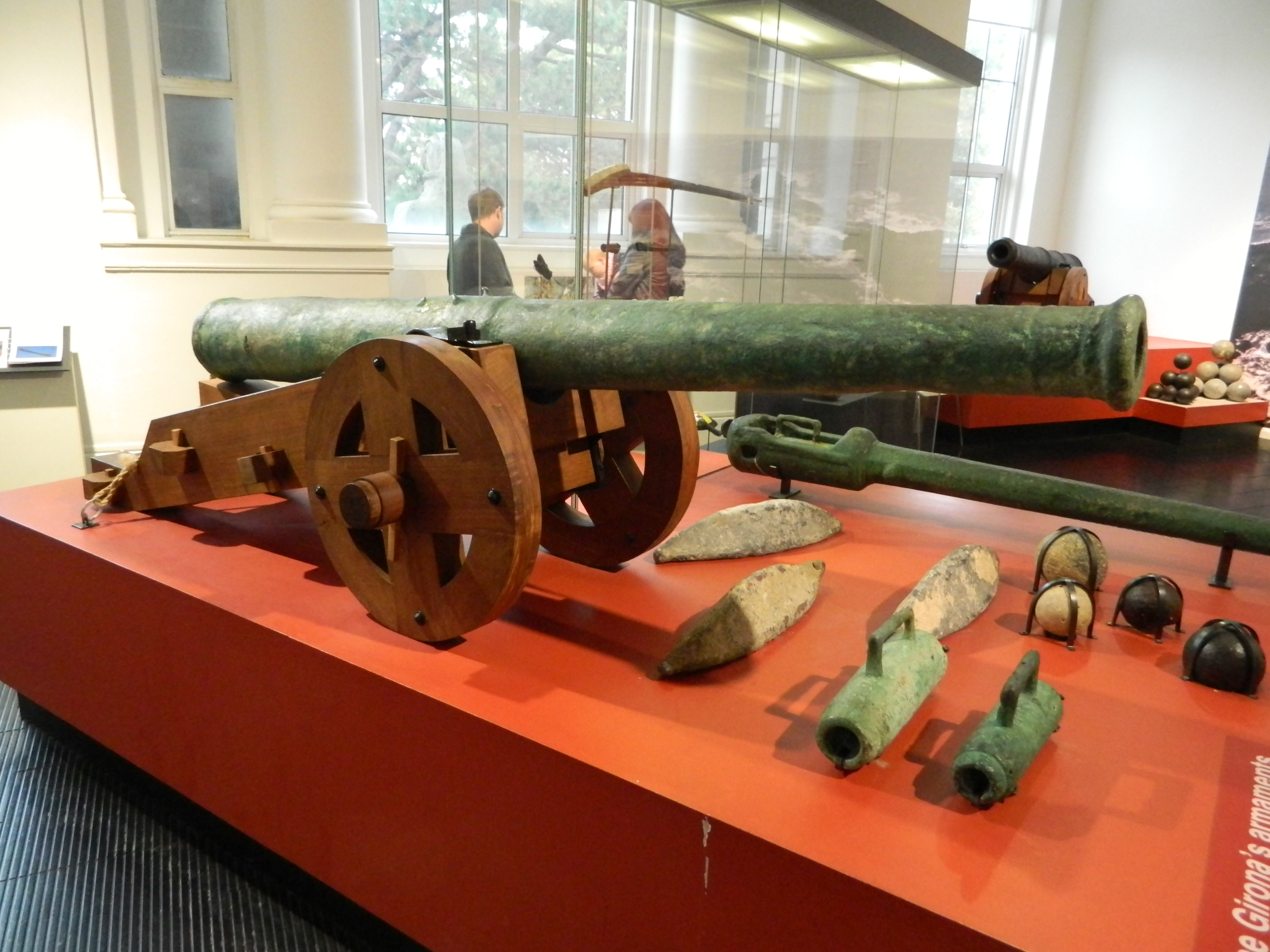
Girona cannons

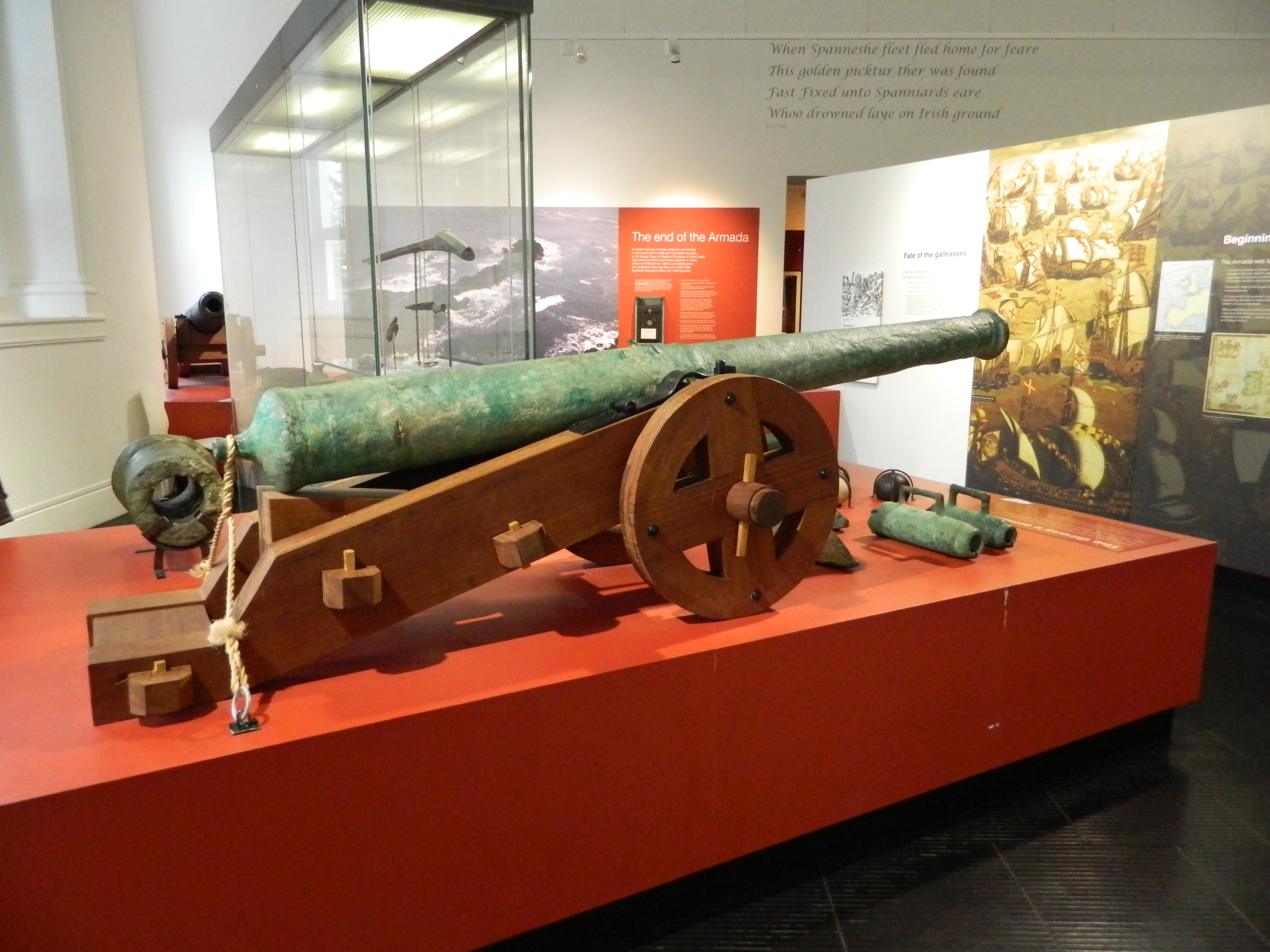
Girona cannon

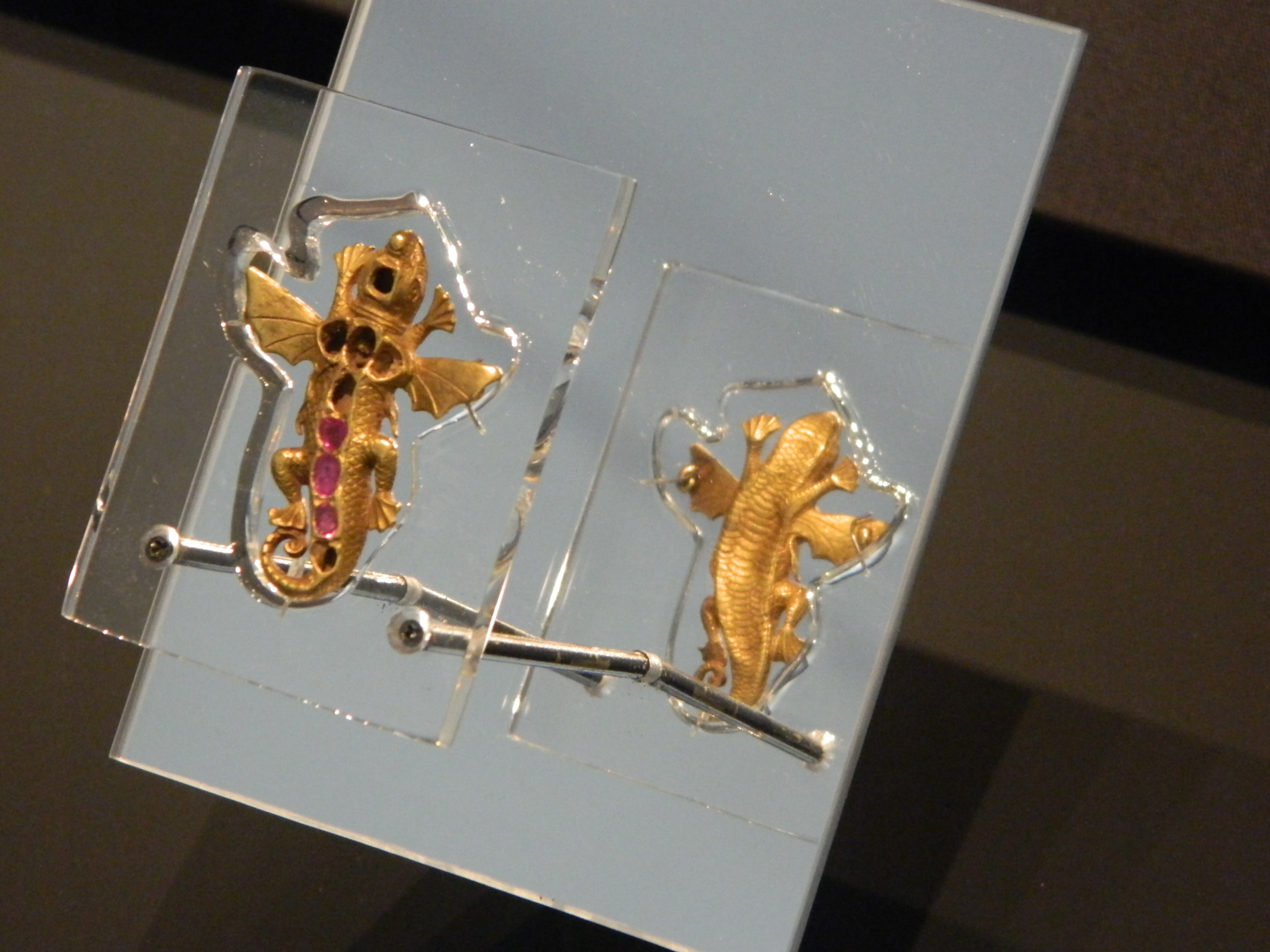
Salamander pendant

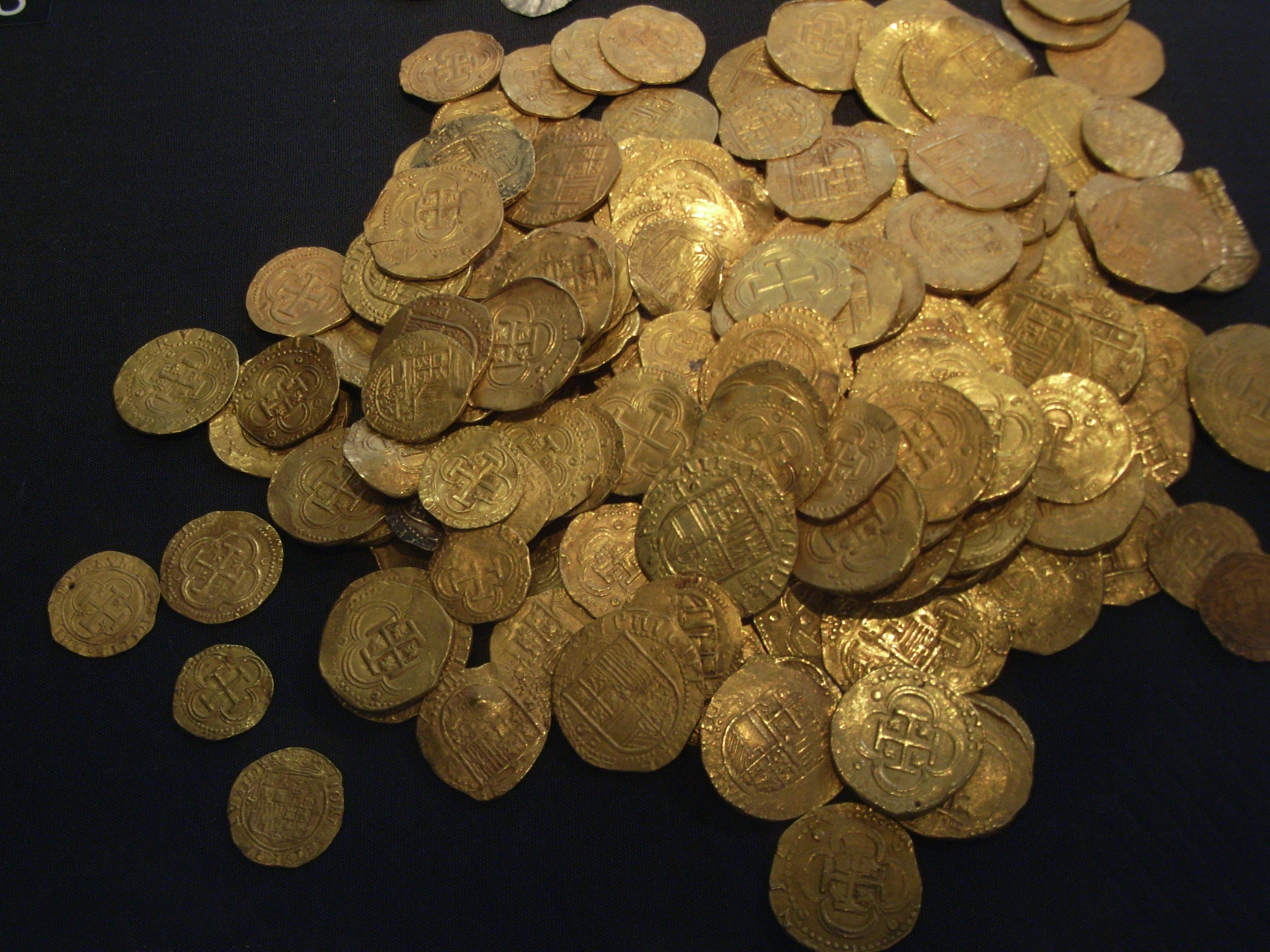
Gold coins from Girona

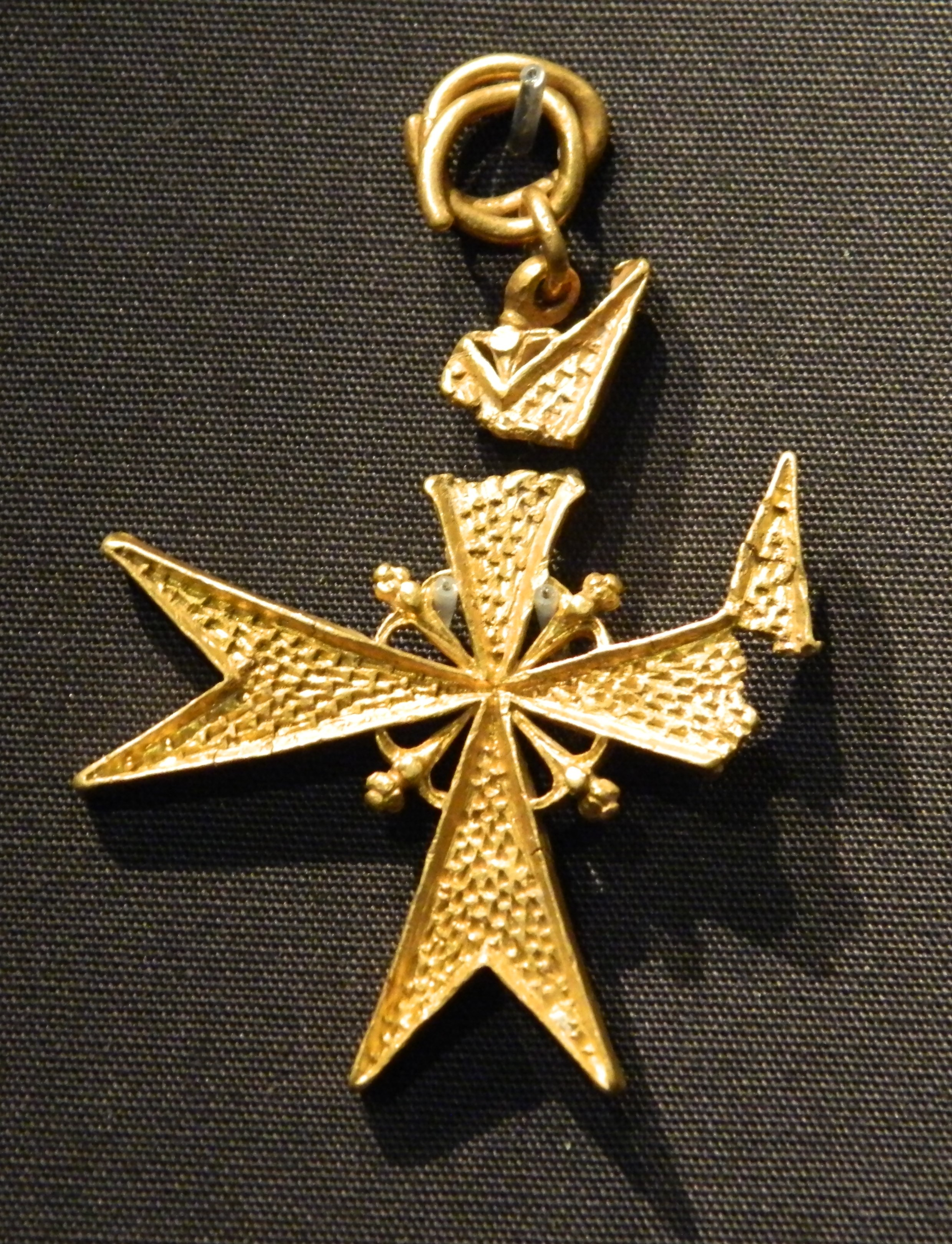
Gold cross of a knight of Saint John of Jerusalem (Order of Malta), most probably Hugo de Moncada y Gralla who was the only knight of the Order on board

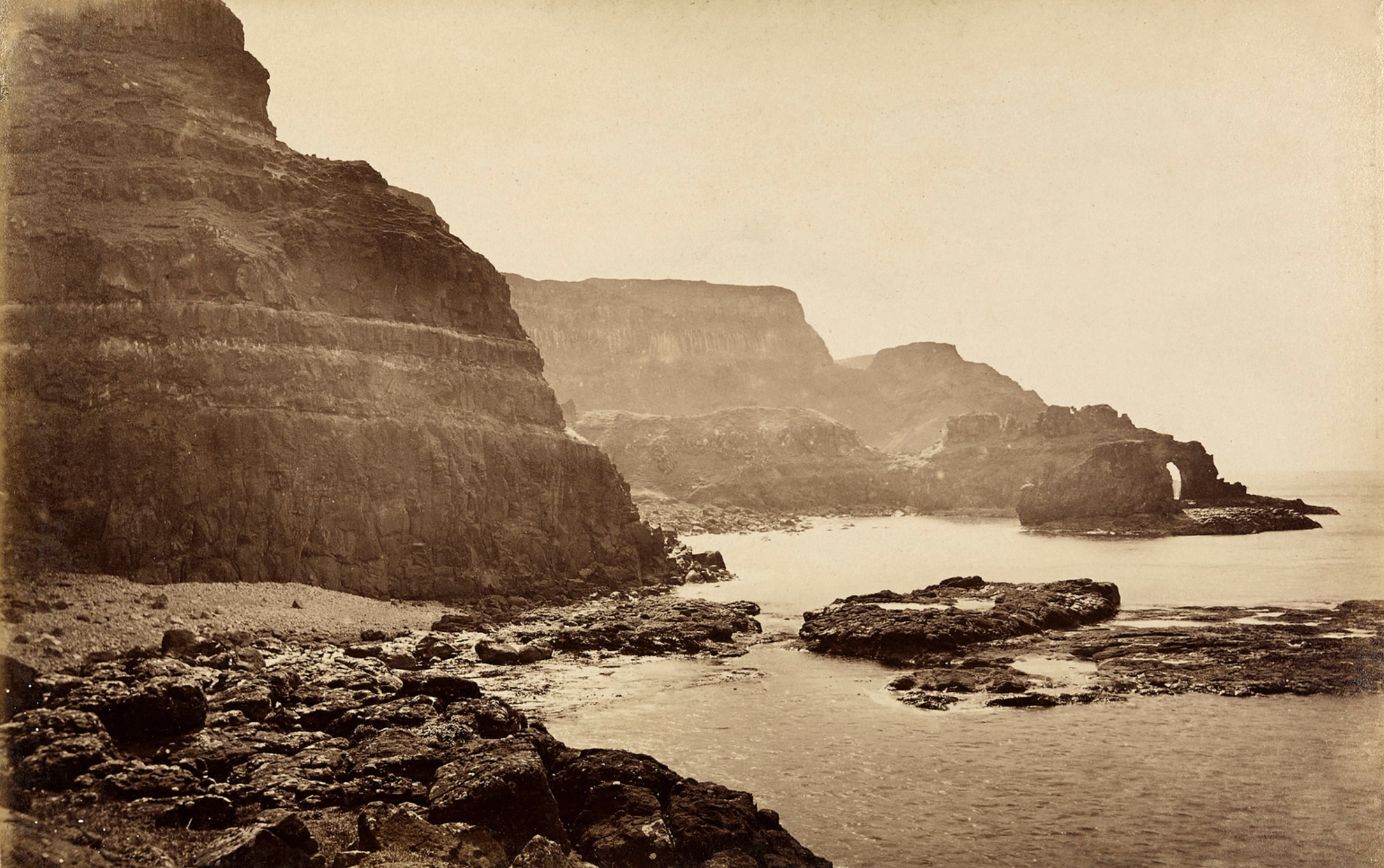
View over Port-Na Spaniagh toward Lacada Point, c.1888.

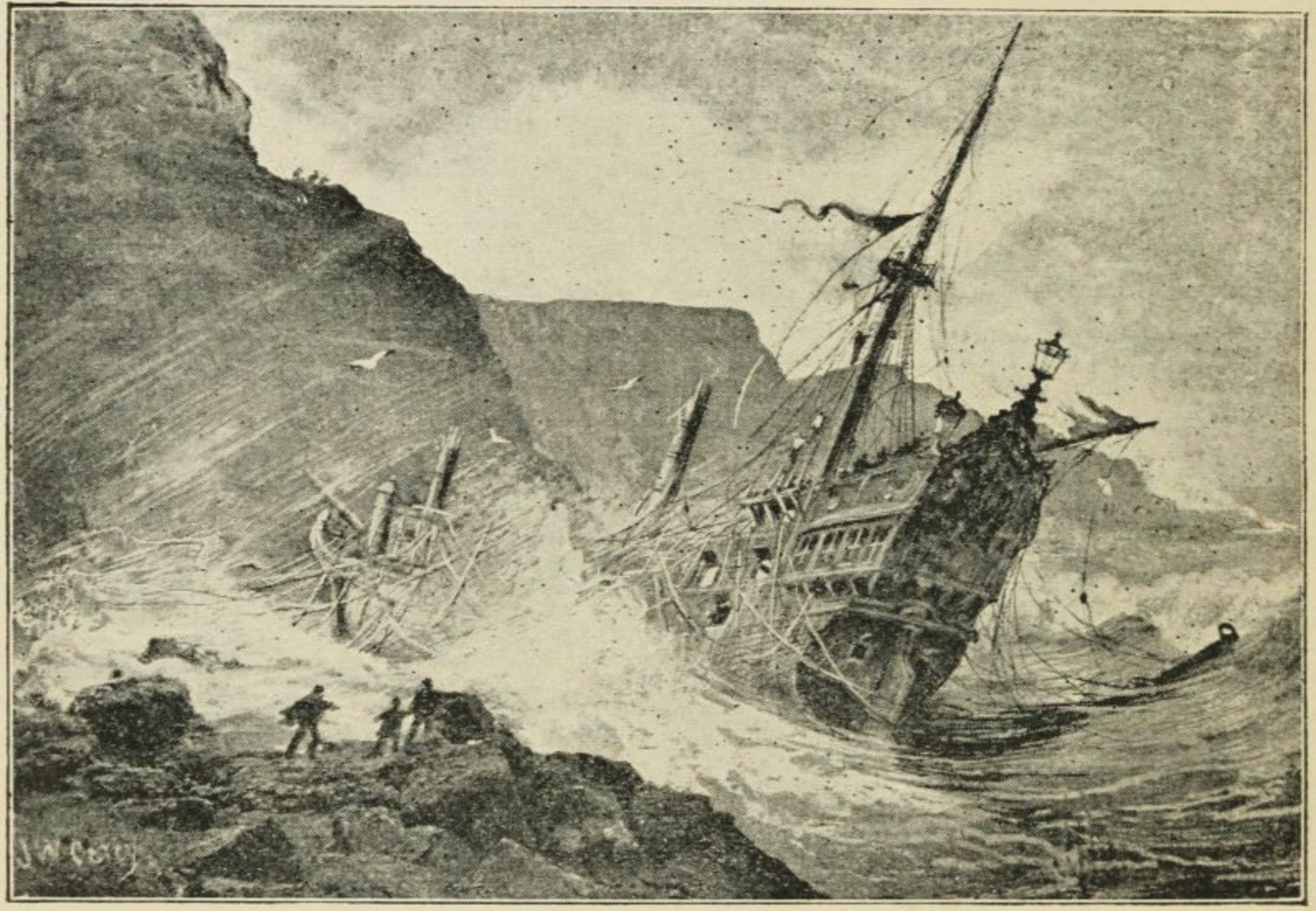
A 19th-century engraving, Spanish Rocks in the background

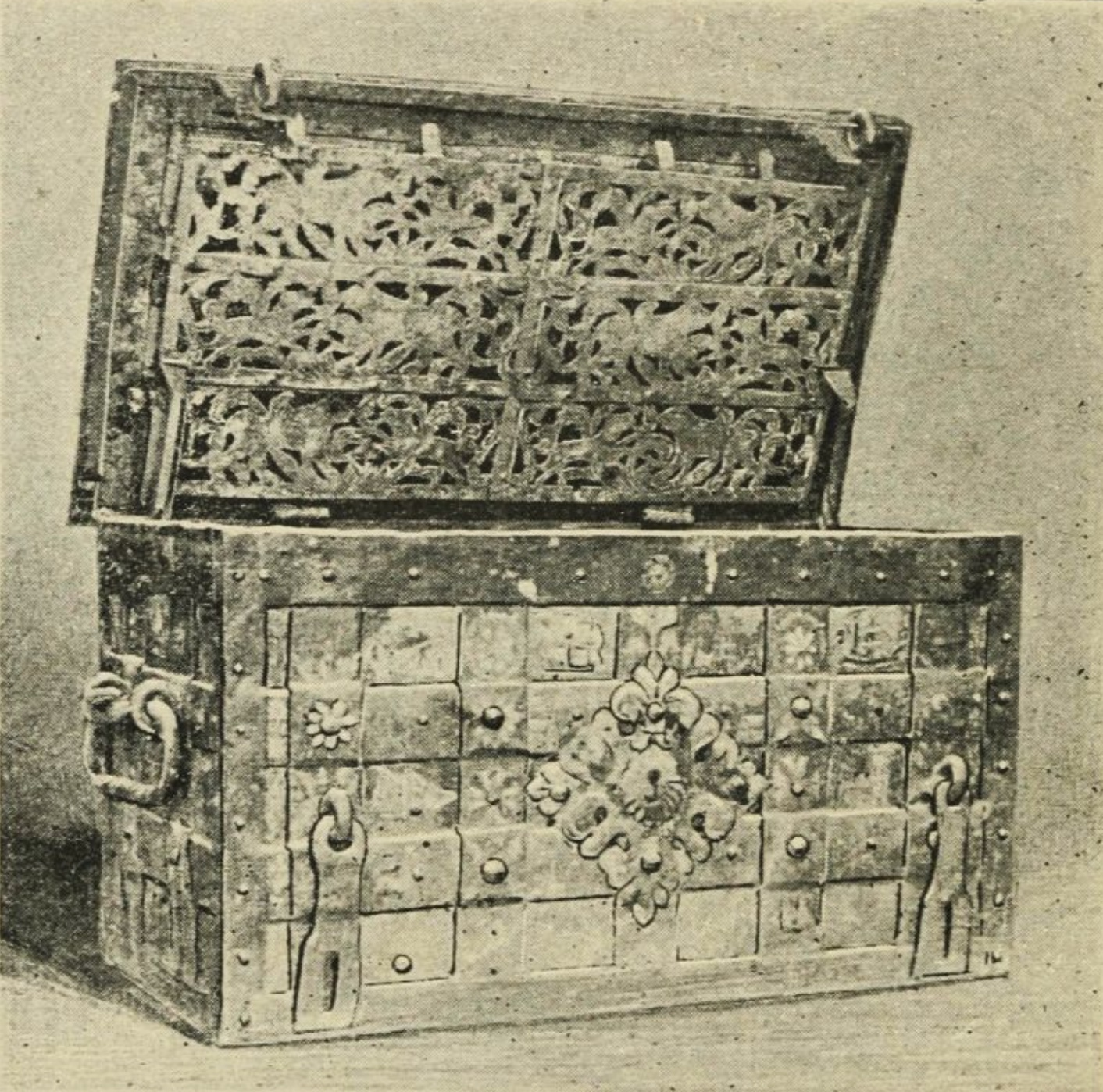
A Spanish Armada treasure chest, considered to be early salvage from the wreck of the Girona.

== See also ==
- Spanish Armada in Ireland
- List of Ships of the Spanish Armada
