= Santiago (1551 ship) =

History

Spain
- Name: Santiago
- Launched: 1551
- Stricken: 1588
- Fate: Wrecked

Santiago was a Spanish Armada supply ship that wrecked south of Bergen, Norway in 1588 (Ødegaard 2001: 19). It was built in 1551 probably in Flanders and, at 37 years old, was one of the oldest ships in the Armada (Ødegaard 2001: 13, Martin & Parker 1999: 26). Santiago was an urca (hulk), a type of ship used to carry goods between northern Europe and southern Europe. Spanish authorities seized Santiago in 1587 while it lay in port in Sanlúcar de Barrameda and pressed it into service for the Armada’s planned invasion of England (Ødegaard 2001: 13).

Santiago carried a variety of supplies and armament. These included 24 artillery mules, gunpowder, musket balls, horseshoes, horseshoe nails, hinges, wagon rods, barrel bands, iron plates, lead bar, and hardtack (Ødegaard 2001: 30,34,74). Santiago was equipped with 19 cannons (Ødegaard 2001: 14, Martin & Parker 1999: 264).

Santiago had 116 people on board when it sailed with the rest of the Armada from La Coruña out into the English Channel to engage the English fleet in July 1588 (Ødegaard 2001: 15, Martin & Parker 1999: xix). The crew consisted of 33 sailors and officers (civilians), 16 stable boys, 3 artillerists, 32 Spanish soldiers, and 32 women who were the wives of the 32 Spanish soldiers. This unusual arrangement (carrying soldiers’ wives) earned Santiago the moniker "ship of the women" (Martin & Parker 1999: 26,264).

Four people had responsibility for the ship and people on board (Ødegaard 2001: 26,29). The captain was Nicolán de Juan of Aragon. The skipper was Simon Unique. Alonso de Olmos had command of the Spanish soldiers. Diego de la Nava had command of the men who operated the artillery and cared for the mules.

After losing a series of battles with the English fleet, the Armada escaped by sailing north between England and Norway (Martin & Parker 1999: 211). They planned to sail around the north end of the British Isles, out into the Atlantic Ocean, then south to Spain. Many ships began to fall behind (Martin & Parker 1999: 211, Ødegaard 2001: 29).

In very bad weather with a strong headwind, running short of supplies, and leaking, Santiago finally turned east and ran with the wind toward Norway (Ødegaard 2001: 29). They made landfall on 18 September 1588 near Skudeneshavn (Ødegaard 2001: 34) and picked up a local man who agreed to guide them north to Bergen. As they sailed up the coast, they encountered another strong storm. Leaking badly, they turned into Hardanger Fjord and wrecked near Mosterhamn (Ødegaard 2001: 34).

Everyone survived the wreck (Ødegaard 2001: 34). After a few months stay at several locations in the Bergen area, most of the crew sailed on a German ship toward Hamburg but wrecked again near Halmstad, Sweden (Ødegaard 2001: 19). They then traveled mostly overland to Buxtehude, a town near Hamburg, where they asked to be released to find their own way home (Ødegaard 2001: 39).
