= Brian O'Neill =

Brian O'Neill may refer to:

== Arts and entertainment ==
- Brian D. O'Neill (born 1949), American author and attorney
- Brian O'Neill (journalist) (c. 1900–1975), English and Irish journalist and author
- Brian O'Neill, fictional Irish gangster in Mafia II

== Sports ==
- Brian O'Neill (ice hockey, born 1929) (1929–2023), Canadian executive in the National Hockey League
- Brian O'Neill (ice hockey, born 1988), American ice hockey player
- Brian O'Neill (American football) (born 1995), American football offensive tackle

== Others ==
- Brian McPhelim O'Neill (died 1574), lord of Lower Clandeboye
- Brian MacArt O'Neill (died 1607), member of the O'Neill Dynasty
- Brian J. O'Neill (born 1949), American politician
- Brian O'Neill (superintendent) (1941–2009), American superintendent of the Golden Gate National Recreation Area
- Brian O'Neill (High-King of Ireland) (died 1260)
- Brian C. O'Neill (born 1965), American earth system scientist and demographer
- Brian O'Neill, Baron Dungannon (died 1562), Irish aristocrat
- Sir Brian O'Neill, 2nd Baronet (died 1694), Irish landowner, barrister and judge
- Brian O'Neill (died 1617), Irish noble
- Brian O'Neill (d. 1295) (c. 1265–1295), king of Tyrone
- Brian Ballagh O'Neill(died 1425), Irish noble
- Brian Ballagh II O'Neill (died 1529), Irish noble

== See also ==
- Brian O'Neil (disambiguation)
