= Brian MacArt O'Neill =

Irish noble (??–??)

Brian MacArt O'Neill was a member of the O'Neill Dynasty, the leading Gaelic family of Ulster. He was the son and heir of Art MacBaron O'Neill of Oneilland and a grandson of Matthew O'Neill, 1st Baron Dungannon. He may have taken part in Tyrone's Rebellion, a conflict in which several of his brothers were killed. Along with the rest of his family he was pardoned as part of the Treaty of Mellifont in 1603.

In 1607 he was arrested on a charge of murder. Because it was unlikely that a jury in County Armagh, where many people remained frightened of the O'Neills, would convict him it was decided to try him in Dublin instead. Despite attempts by his powerful and influential uncle Hugh O'Neill, Earl of Tyrone to have him pardoned the sentence was still set to be carried out. Tyrone reportedly offered a bribe of £500 to secure his release, which was refused.

The steadfast refusal of the Viceroy of Ireland Sir Arthur Chichester to overturn the death sentence, convinced Tyrone that his power was being weakened despite his generally good relations with James I in London. This was a factor in his decision to take part in the Flight of the Earls which took him into exile in Italy. The Earl's departure sealed the fate of Brian who was hanged on the reduced charge of manslaughter.

Three of his brothers served as mercenaries in the Spanish Army. The best-known of them was Owen Roe O'Neill.

== Bibliography ==
- Casway, Jerrold. Owen Roe O'Neill and the Struggle for Catholic Ireland. University of Pennsylvania Press, 1984.
- McCavitt, John. The Flight of the Earls. Gill & MacMillan, 2002.
