= Art MacBaron O'Neill =

Irish landowner & soldier (c.1550–1618)

Art MacBaron O'Neill (Irish: Art mac Baron Ó Néill; before 1550 – 28 November 1618) was an Irish landowner and soldier who fought in the Nine Years' War. He is sometimes referred to as Arthur O'Neill.

== Early life ==
Art MacBaron O'Neill was born into the O'Neill clan, the ruling Gaelic Irish noble family of Tír Eoghain in Ulster. He was the son of Matthew O'Neill, 1st Baron Dungannon. His epithet "MacBaron" referred to his father's title ("son of the Baron"). His father's other children were Brian O'Neill, Cormac MacBaron O'Neill and Hugh O'Neill, Earl of Tyrone.

It is clear that Hugh and Brian were sons of Matthew's wife Siobhán Maguire, but the identity of Art and Cormac's mother is not entirely clear. John O'Hart stated that Cormac MacBaron and Art MacBaron were illegitimate. Hiram Morgan and Jerrold Casway similarly refer to Art as Hugh's half-brother. Conversely, Emmett O'Byrne states that all four boys were Siobhan's sons, thus making them all full-brothers.

Brian was Matthew's eldest son. Casway stated that Art was older than Hugh, who was born c. 1550.

In the 1550s, a rivalry formed between his uncle Shane and his father Matthew over the latter's legitimacy. The O'Neill family split into rival septs—the "MacShanes" (Shane's immediate family) and the "MacBarons" (Matthew's immediate family). The English encouraged this conflict as it weakened the powerful clan.

Shane had Matthew killed in 1558, placing the MacBaron children in a dangerous situation. The Dublin Castle administration hoped to use the support of the MacBarons to curb the MacShanes' growing power in Ulster. Hugh and his brother Brian became wards of the Crown and were moved to the Pale, where they were raised. Art MacBaron O'Neill "held the fort" for the MacBarons when Shane O'Neill was predominant in the area.

== Career ==
O'Neill ruled over Oneilland south of Lough Neagh. Unlike most Irish nobles, he could speak fluent English despite not being raised amongst English speakers.

O'Neill fought alongside his brother during Tyrone's Rebellion (1593–1603). Despite a series of defeats against the Irish Army that culminated in the burning of their capital at Dungannon and retreat into the woods, they were able to agree the Treaty of Mellifont which restored them to royal favour under the new King James I. O'Neill and his brothers were pardoned for their past activities and had their lands restored to them.

Art did not take part in the Flight of the Earls. It is not clear if he stayed in Ireland by choice or was deserted by Hugh. Hugh's departure may have been so quick that Art was not able to respond.

Art MacBaron O'Neill died on 28 November 1618.

== Children ==
Art MacBaron O'Neill was married at least three times. His first wife was a daughter of Brian McPhelim O'Neill. (Note: Art's brother Hugh was married to this woman's older sister.) Another wife was Rose, daughter of Turlough Luineach O'Neill, who survived Art by at least seven years. His third wife was the daughter of Hugh Conallach O'Reilly of Breifne.

Sources indicate that O'Neill had ten sons and four daughters who reached maturity. Six of his sons died in the Nine Years' War.

Brian O'Neill was hanged as an outlaw in 1607. The two remaining sons also served in the Spanish Army.

His children include:

- Owen Roe O'Neill (c. 1580 – 6 November 1649); son of Art's wife O'Reilly
- Conn Ruadh O'Neill
- Brian MacArt O'Neill (died 1607); (Note: Morgan stated that Brian died in 1608.) illegitimate son
- Niall O'Neill (died 1600)
- Art Oge O'Neill (died 1640); died at the siege of Barcelona. (Note: Morgan stated that Art Oge died in 1606.)
- A daughter; married Miles O'Reilly
- A daughter; married into the Maguire family
- A daughter; married into the Magennis family
- A daughter; married into the O'Neill family of Upper Clandeboye
