= Brian O'Neil =

Brian O'Neil may refer to:

- Brian E. O'Neil (1921–1985), American philosopher
- Brian O'Neil (footballer, born 1972), Scottish former footballer who played for Celtic, Aberdeen, Wolfsburg, Derby County and Preston North End
- Brian O'Neil (footballer, born 1944), English former footballer who played for Burnley, Southampton and Huddersfield Town

== See also ==
- Brian O'Neal (born 1970), American football player
- Brian O'Neill (disambiguation)
- Bryan O'Neil (1905–1954), British archaeologist
