= Matthew O'Neill, 1st Baron Dungannon =

Irish peer (1510–1558)

Matthew O'Neill, Baron Dungannon Feardorcha Ó Néill
- Born: c. 1510; Ulster, Ireland
- Died: 1558; Ulster, Ireland
- Cause of death: Assassinated

Matthew O'Neill, 1st Baron Dungannon (alias Matthew Kelly, alias Feardorcha Ó Néill; c. 1510–1558), was an Irish aristocrat. He was accepted by Conn O'Neill as his natural son. Matthew was challenged by his half-brother Shane O'Neill over the succession to the Earldom of Tyrone and was murdered by some of his supporters.

== Birth and origins ==
Mathew was born about 1510, a son of Alison Kelly (née Roth) in Dundalk, the wife of a blacksmith in Dundalk. At the age of sixteen, Matthew was presented to Conn O'Neill, with whom Kelly had previously had an affair. Tyrone accepted that Matthew was his natural son.

Family tree

Matthew O'Neill with wife, parents, and selected relatives. (Note: This family tree is based on genealogies of the genealogies of the O'Neills of Tyrone. Also see the lists of children in the text.)

Conn Mor; O'Neill d. 1493	Eleanor; FitzGerald
Alice; FitzGerald	Conn; 1st Earl; Tyrone c. 1480 – 1559	Sorcha; O'Neill
Phelim; Caoch; O'Neill d. 1542 d.v.p.*	Mathew; Baron; Dungannon c. 1510–1558; Illegitimate d.v.p.*	Joan; Maguire; 1558	Shane; O'Neill c. 1530 – 1567; The Proud
Art; MacBaron d. 1618; Illegitimate	Brian; 2nd Earl; Tyrone d. 1562 de jure	Hugh; 3rd Earl; Tyrone c. 1550–1616	Siobhan; O'Donnell d. 1591
Owen; Roe; O'Neill c. 1585–1649	Hugh; Baron; Dungannon c. 1585–1609 d.v.p.*	Henry; O'Neill c. 1586–1610

Legend

XXX	Subject of the article	XXX	Earl of Tyrone

d.v.p. = decessit vita patris (predeceased his father).

== Marriage and children ==
Around 1536 Matthew married Siobhan, daughter of Cú Chonnacht Maguire, lord of Fir Manach.

Matthew and Siobhan had three sons:

1. Brian (died 1562), called Lord Dungannon, de jure 2nd Earl of Tyrone, murdered
2. Hugh (c. 1550 – 1616), who succeeded as the 3rd Earl of Tyrone
3. Cormac (died 1613)

Matthew also had an illegitimate (Note: O'Byrne states that all four of Matthew's sons were legitimate.) son:

- Art MacBaron O'Neill (died 1618)

== Baron Dungannon ==
As part of the surrender and regrant policy brought in during the reign of Henry VIII, his father was in October 1542 made Earl of Tyrone with Matthew confirmed as his heir and made Baron of Dungannon. Both visited London to formally submit to the King.

== Conflict with Shane O'Neill ==
This arrangement was disputed by Matthew's legitimate half-brother Shane O'Neill, who had a larger and more powerful following. Shane's violent response crushed the government's hope for a peaceful succession. Matthew was killed by Shane's men in 1558. At some point between May and August 1558, English statesman Sir Henry Sidney organised the retrieval of Dungannon's sons Brian and Hugh, and for a brief time they stayed at Sydney's Dublin residence. Dungannon's father Conn O'Neill died in 1559.

In his attempts to gain recognition of the title of Earl of Tyrone from the Crown, Shane suggested that Matthew had not really been Conn's son, and his real father was a blacksmith from Dundalk named Kelly. Shane tried to show Matthew's claims were weak under both the English law of primogeniture as well as the Gaelic custom of the strongest member of the family inheriting. Shane received some recognition of his role as head of the Ó Néills, but he was never made an earl. Shane was killed by the MacDonnells of Antrim in 1567.

== Notes and references ==
=== Sources ===
- Brady, Ciaran (2002) [1st pub. 1996]. The Chief Governors: The Rise and Fall of Reform Government in Tudor Ireland 1536–1588. Cambridge: Cambridge University Press. ISBN 0-521-46176-6.
- Brady, Ciaran (2015) [1st pub. 1996]. Shane O'Neill (New ed.). Dublin: University College Dublin Press for the Historical Association of Ireland. ISBN 978-1-91082005-6.
- Burke, Bernard (1866). A Genealogical History of the Dormant, Abeyant, Forfeited and Extinct Peerages of the British Empire (New ed.). London: Harrison. OCLC 11501348.
- Canny, Nicholas (7 June 2022). "Hugh O'Neill in Irish historical discourse, c.1550–2021". Irish Historical Studies. 46 (169): 25–51. doi:10.1017/ihs.2022.2. ISSN 0021-1214.
- Cokayne, George Edward (1896). Complete Peerage of England, Scotland, Ireland, Great Britain and the United Kingdom, Extant, Extinct, or Dormant. Vol. VII (1st ed.). London: George Bell and Sons. OCLC 1180891114. – S to T
- Morgan, Hiram (1993). Tyrone's Rebellion: The outbreak of the Nine Years' War in Tudor Ireland. London: The Boydell Press. ISBN 0-86193-224-2.
- O'Byrne, Emmett (October 2009). McGuire, James; Quinn, James (eds.). "O'Neill (Ó Neill), Matthew (Feardorcha)". Dictionary of Irish Biography.
