= Brian O'Neill, Baron Dungannon =

Baron Dungannon (c.1550–1562)

Brian O'Neill
- 2nd Baron Dungannon
- Born: before 1550
- Died: 12 April 1562; Ulster, Ireland
- Cause of death: Assassination
- Noble family: O'Neill dynasty
- Parents: Matthew O'Neill, 1st Baron Dungannon

Brian O'Neill, 2nd Baron Dungannon (Irish: Brian Ó Néill; before 1550 (Note: Brian was older than his brother Hugh, who was born c. 1550.) – 12 April 1562) was an Irish aristocrat of the Elizabethan era. He was part of the O'Neill dynasty, a Gaelic family in Ulster.

== Life ==
Brian's father was Matthew O'Neill, 1st Baron Dungannon, who had been given his title by King Henry VIII as part of the surrender and regrant policy. Brian's mother was Matthew's wife Siobhán Maguire. Matthew was assassinated by his half-brother Shane O'Neill in 1558. The O'Neill family had split into the MacShane (Shane's family) and MacBaron (Matthew's family) branch. Brian had been imprisoned in Scotland by James MacDonnell in early 1556, but appears to have returned to Ulster in late 1558 or early 1559.

Shane tried to have the government recognise Matthew and his sons as illegitimate, but they continued to be supported by the Lord Deputy, The 3rd Earl of Sussex, in Dublin. Brian pursued his claims to the Earldom of Tyrone and lobbied the government to eject Shane from Tír Eoghain.

In 1562, Shane and Brian were ordered to attend the Court in London to present their cases to Queen Elizabeth I and her ministers. Shane came to London, but while Brian was travelling from Newry to Carlingford, he was assassinated by Turlough Luineach O'Neill on 12 April, almost certainly on the orders of Shane. While Shane made a melodramatic submission to the Queen in London, she only partly accepted his claims. Shane was himself assassinated five years later by the MacDonnells of Antrim.

Brian was succeeded by his younger brother Hugh who became Earl of Tyrone and head of the Ó Néills. His other half-brothers were Cormac and Arthur. In Gaelic form he is often known as Brian mac Baron Ó Néill.

== Bibliography ==
- Casway, Jerrold (2016). "Catherine Magennis and the Wives of Hugh O'Neill". Seanchas Ardmhacha: Journal of the Armagh Diocesan Historical Society. 26 (1). Cumann Seanchais Ard Mhacha/Armagh Diocesan Historical Society: 69–79. ISSN 0488-0196. JSTOR 48568219.
- Cokayne, George Edward (1896). Complete Peerage of England, Scotland, Ireland, Great Britain and the United Kingdom, Extant, Extinct, or Dormant. Vol. VII (1st ed.). London: George Bell and Sons. OCLC 1180891114.
- Falls, Cyril (1997). Elizabeth's Irish Wars. Syracuse University Press.
- Morgan, Hiram (1993). Tyrone's Rebellion: The outbreak of the Nine Years' War in Tudor Ireland. London: The Boydell Press. ISBN 0-86193-224-2.
- O'Byrne, Emmett (October 2009). "O'Neill (Ó Néill), Brian". Dictionary of Irish Biography.
- O'Hart, John (1892). Irish Pedigrees: Or, the Origin and Stem of the Irish Nation. Vol. I (5th ed.). Dublin: James Duffy & Co. OCLC 7239210.

Peerage of Ireland
Preceded by Matthew O'Neill	Baron Dungannon; 1558–1562	Succeeded by Hugh O'Neill
