= Hugh O'Neill, Earl of Tyrone =

Irish earl (c. 1550–1616)

Hugh O'Neill
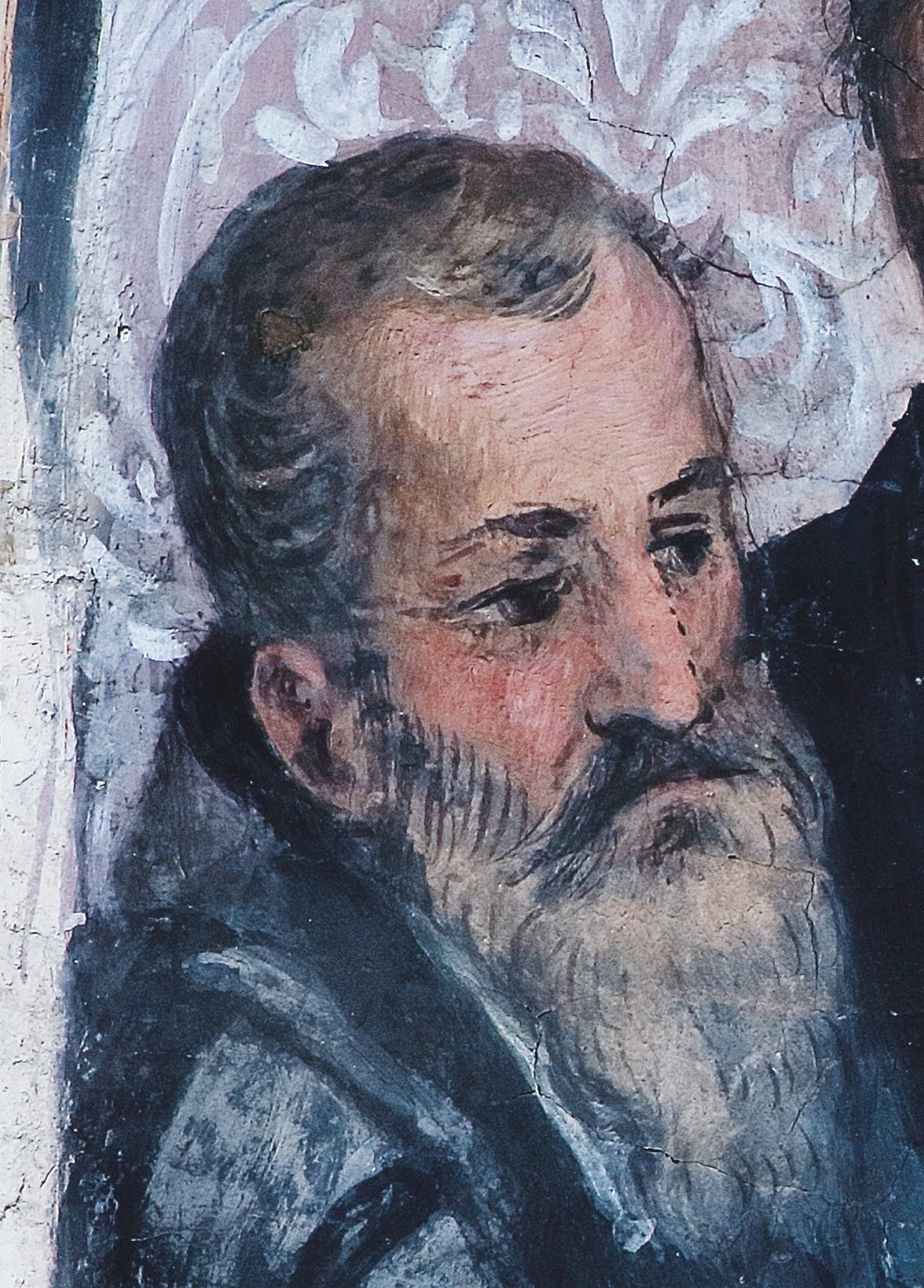
- Extract of a fresco depicting Hugh O'Neill, painted c. 1610 by Giovanni Battista Ricci

Chief of the Name O'Neill
- Reign: 15 September 1595 – 10 July 1616
- Inauguration: 15 September 1595
- Predecessor: Turlough Luineach O'Neill
- Successor: Dormant

Earl of Tyrone (Note: Hugh is usually referred to as the 2nd Earl of Tyrone, but if his elder brother Brian is counted, Hugh is 3rd. By the patent of the earldom, Brian was de jure earl between his grandfather's death in 1559 and his assassination in 1562. Brian pursued his claim to the earldom by lobbying the government, but was never recognised as Earl and did not control Tír Eoghain.)
- Tenure: 30 June 1585 – 28 October 1614
- Predecessor: Conn Bacagh O'Neill, 1st Earl of Tyrone
- Successor: Attainted in 1614 (Note: The title Earl of Tyrone was attainted by the Parliament of Ireland on 28 October 1614. Tyrone's son Shane was recognised by the Spanish court as his successor, and granted the equivalent title Conde de Tyrone. Officially Shane was the third of this title.)

3rd Baron Dungannon
- Tenure: 12 April 1562 – 10 May 1587
- Predecessor: Brian O'Neill, 2nd Baron Dungannon
- Successor: Hugh O'Neill, 4th Baron Dungannon
- Born: c. 1550; Tír Eoghain, Ireland
- Died: 10 July [N.S. 20 July] 1616 (aged about 66); Rome, Papal States
- Burial: 11 July [N.S. 21 July] 1616; San Pietro in Montorio, Rome
- Spouse: Katherine O'Neill (ann. 1574); Siobhán O'Donnell (m. 1574; died 1591); Mabel Bagenal (m. 1591; died 1595); Catherine Magennis (m. 1597)
- Issue Detail: Conn Mac An Iarla; Rose; Alice, Countess of Antrim; Hugh, 4th Baron Dungannon; Henry; Shane, 3rd Earl of Tyrone; Brian; Conn Ruadh
- House: O'Neill dynasty
- Father: Matthew O'Neill, 1st Baron Dungannon
- Mother: Siobhán Maguire

Hugh O'Neill, Earl of Tyrone (Irish: Aodh Mór Ó Néill; (Note: Literally translates to Hugh the Great O'Neill.) c. 1550 – 10 July [N.S. 20 July] 1616), (Note: Unless otherwise stated, dates in this article before 14 September 1752 are in the Julian calendar.) was an Irish lord and key figure of the Nine Years' War. Known as the "Great Earl", he led the confederacy of Irish lords against the English Crown's conquest of Ireland during the Elizabethan era.

He was born into the O'Neill clan, Tír Eoghain's ruling noble family, during a violent succession conflict which saw his father assassinated. At the age of eight he was relocated to the Pale where he was raised by an English family. Although the Crown hoped to mold him into a puppet ruler sympathetic to the English government, by the 1570s he had built a strong network of both English and Irish contacts which he utilised for his pursuit of political power, eventually becoming one of the richest and most powerful lords in Ireland.

Throughout the early 1590s, Tyrone secretly supported rebellions against the Crown's advances into Ulster whilst publicly maintaining a loyal appearance. He regularly deceived government officials via bribes and convoluted disinformation campaigns. Tyrone introduced a "military revolution" to Ireland with his adoption of both firearms and continental military tactics, making him well-prepared to resist English incursions. In 1591 he caused a stir when he eloped with Mabel Bagenal, younger sister of the Marshal of the Queen's Irish Army. During the Battle of Belleek, Tyrone fought alongside his brother-in-law Henry Bagenal whilst covertly commanding the very troops they were fighting against. After years of playing both sides, he finally went into open rebellion in early 1595 with an assault on the Blackwater Fort. Despite victories at the Battle of the Yellow Ford and Battle of Curlew Pass, the confederacy began to suffer upon the arrival of Lord Deputy Mountjoy and commander Henry Docwra in Ulster. Tyrone was not able to secure reinforcements from Spain until the arrival of the 4th Spanish Armada in late 1601. The confederacy was decisively defeated at the Siege of Kinsale, and Tyrone surrendered to Mountjoy in 1603 with the signing of the Treaty of Mellifont.

Due to increasing hostility against Tyrone and his allies—and possibly believing his arrest for treason was imminent—in 1607 he fled with his countrymen to continental Europe in what is known as the Flight of the Earls. He settled in Rome where he was granted a small pension by Pope Paul V. Despite his plans to return to and retake Ireland, he died during his exile.

In comparison to his aggressive and warlike ally Hugh Roe O'Donnell, Tyrone was cautious and deliberate. A consummate liar, he is considered an enigma to historians due to the elaborate bluffs he employed to mislead his opponents. Although wartime propaganda promoted Tyrone as a "Catholic crusader", historians believe his motivations were primarily political rather than religious—though he apparently underwent a genuine conversion around 1598. He also held the title 3rd Baron Dungannon, and in 1595 he became the last inaugurated Chief of the Name of the O'Neill clan. He was married four times and had many concubines and children.

== Family background and early life, 1550–1561 ==
=== Birth and family ===
Hugh O'Neill was born c. 1550 (Note: Until the early twentieth century, historians assumed Tyrone's birthdate to be within the 1540s. This changed with the discovery of a 1562 letter stating Tyrone to be "not yet twelve years old". Paul Walsh placed Tyrone's birthdate between July 1550 and July 1551.) in the Gaelic kingdom of Tír Eoghain in Ulster. (Note: Hiram Morgan stated that Hugh O'Neill was born in the barony of Oneilland (present-day northern County Armagh), possibly in a crannog such as Marlacoo. Micheline Kerney Walsh stated that Hugh O'Neill was born in Dungannon, which is in present-day County Tyrone.) The O'Neill dynasty were Tír Eoghain's ruling Gaelic Irish noble family, and claimed descent from Niall Ruadh of the Cenél nEógain, who was a descendant of legendary high king Niall of the Nine Hostages. Hugh was the second son of Feardorcha "Matthew" O'Neill, 1st Baron Dungannon (c. 1510–1558) and his wife Siobhán Maguire (died 1600). Hugh's paternal grandparents were clan chief Conn Bacagh O'Neill, 1st Earl of Tyrone (c. 1484–1559) and Alison Kelly of Dundalk, a blacksmith's wife. Siobhán was a daughter of Cúconnacht Maguire, Lord of Fermanagh (c. 1480–1537). Hugh had three brothers: Brian, Cormac MacBaron and Art MacBaron. (Note: John O'Hart states that Cormac MacBaron and Art MacBaron were not Siobhan's sons, making them half-brothers of Hugh and Brian. Emmett O'Byrne states that all four boys were Siobhan's sons, thus making them all full-brothers.) During his youth, Hugh was fostered by the O'Hagan and O'Quinn families.

Family tree of Hugh O'Neill and selected relatives

Hugh O'Neill with one of his wives and selected relatives

Alison; Kelly	Conn; 1st Earl; Tyrone c. 1484–1559	Sorcha; O'Neill
Mathew; 1st Baron; Dungannon c. 1510–1558 d.v.p.	Siobhán; Maguire d. 1600	Shane; O'Neill c. 1530–1567
Art; MacBaron d. 1618	Brian; 2nd Baron; Dungannon d. 1562 de jure Earl of Tyrone	Hugh; Earl; Tyrone c. 1550–1616	Siobhán; O'Donnell d. 1591
Owen; Roe; O'Neill c. 1580–1649	Alice; O'Neill; 1583–c. 1665	Hugh; 4th Baron; Dungannon c. 1585–1609 d.v.p.	Henry; 5th Baron; Dungannon c. 1586–1610 de jure, d.v.p.

Legend

XXX	Subject of the article	XXX	Earl of Tyrone	XXX	Baron; Dungannon

d.v.p. = decessit vita patris (predeceased his father)

=== O'Neill succession conflict ===
During Hugh's childhood, a rivalry formed between his uncle Shane and his father Matthew. Matthew was born from an affair between Conn Bacagh and Alison, but was accepted by Conn Bacagh as his son and tanist (designated heir). This affronted Shane, a younger legitimate son of Conn Bacagh, who employed the ambivalent status of Matthew's paternity to affirm his own claim to the chieftaincy. Shane asserted that Matthew's father was actually Alison's husband John Kelly. In the ensuing conflict, the O'Neill family split into rival septs—the "MacShanes" (Shane's immediate family) and the "MacBarons" (Matthew's immediate family). The English encouraged this conflict as it weakened the powerful O'Neill clan.

Shane had Matthew killed in 1558, placing Hugh and his elder brother Brian in a dangerous situation. The Dublin Castle administration hoped to use the support of the MacBarons to curb the MacShanes' growing power in Ulster. At some point between May and August 1558, English statesman Henry Sidney organised the retrieval of the two boys, and for a brief time they stayed at his Dublin residence.

=== Raised in the Pale ===
Hugh and his brother Brian became wards of the Crown. They were moved into the care of the Anglo-Irish Hovenden family and were raised at their household in Balgriffin, County Dublin—a property formerly belonging to Conn Bacagh. The Crown sought to keep the children safe from harm and to raise them in the English manner, so that they would be more sympathetic to the administration once they came of age and took their places in the Gaelic nobility.

Giles Hovenden, Hugh's foster father, was an English settler with a pre-existing business connection with Conn Bacagh. Hugh was raised by Giles's wife Joan Walshe, and she continued to care for Hugh after Giles's death. Hugh remained close with his adoptive family throughout the rest of his life. His foster brother Henry became his chief advisor and accompanied him on his flight in 1607. Brothers Henry and Richard led Hugh's troops in the late 1580s.

Growing up in the Pale amongst English people, Hugh gained a knowledge of English customs and politics. He was able to secure allies such as the Earls of Ormonde and Leicester. He would have received a basic education, either by attending grammar school or from private lessons.

== Early career, 1562–1579 ==
=== Baron Dungannon ===
Brian was assassinated in 1562 by Shane's tanist Turlough Luineach O'Neill, and Hugh succeeded him as 3rd Baron Dungannon and heir to the earldom. Four years later, war broke out between Shane and the Crown. It was previously considered unlikely that a MacBaron could sway Shane's dominance in Ulster, but in light of these events, the English government began to view Hugh as a significant contender who could bring Ulster under loyalist control. On the contrary, Hugh's main concern was the ruthless pursuit of political and military power, and he intended to remain autonomous and independent.

=== Return to Ulster ===
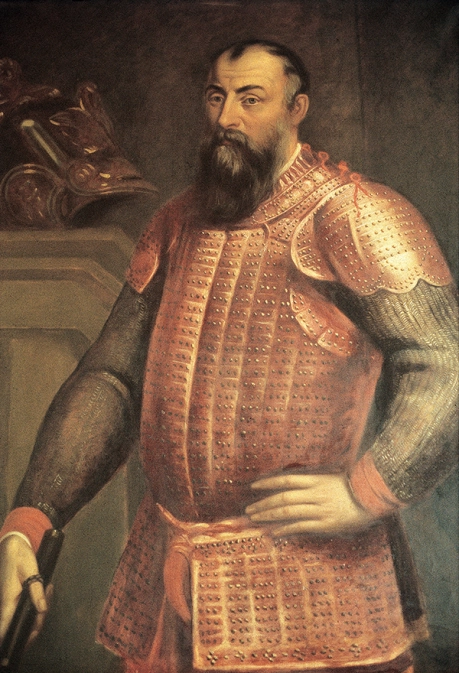
This well-known 19th-century portrait of Hugh O'Neill, once owned by Lord Dunsany, is a "Victorian fantasy".

In June 1567, Shane was killed by Scots supporting the MacDonnells of Antrim. Hugh's wardship formally ended when he sued out his livery the following November. Lord Deputy Sidney brought Hugh, together with a delegation of heirs of Irish clans, to visit the royal court in London to seek permission for the restructuring of Ulster. This was young Hugh's first visit to England. He finally returned to Ulster in early 1568 having been granted territory in Oneilland. Sidney intended to keep Turlough from crossing south past the River Blackwater, thus creating further discord within the O'Neill family.

Now returned to his province of birth, Hugh began engaging the support of neighbouring Irish Gaelic families, including the O'Hagans, the O'Quinns and his own family the MacBarons (his younger brothers Cormac MacBaron and Art MacBaron had remained in Ulster). As he had spent the previous ten years raised as an Englishman, these families would have considered Hugh an outsider. He married the daughter of favoured noble Brian McPhelim O'Neill, but in 1574 he hastily annulled the marriage when his father-in-law was implicated in a bloody conflict and tried for treason. The same year, Hugh established his most important and longlasting alliance by remarrying to Siobhán O'Donnell, daughter of chief Hugh McManus O'Donnell. The O'Donnell and O'Neill clans had traditionally been mortal enemies for centuries. Hugh O'Neill gained good standing with English colonisers, such as Thomas Smith and Walter Devereux, 1st Earl of Essex, after assisting in attacks on Turlough. Essex commended Hugh as "the only man of Ulster... to be trusted and used". By the early 1570s, Hugh was using his combined support from the Pale and Ulster to put Turlough under heavy pressure.

== Rise to power, 1580–1593 ==
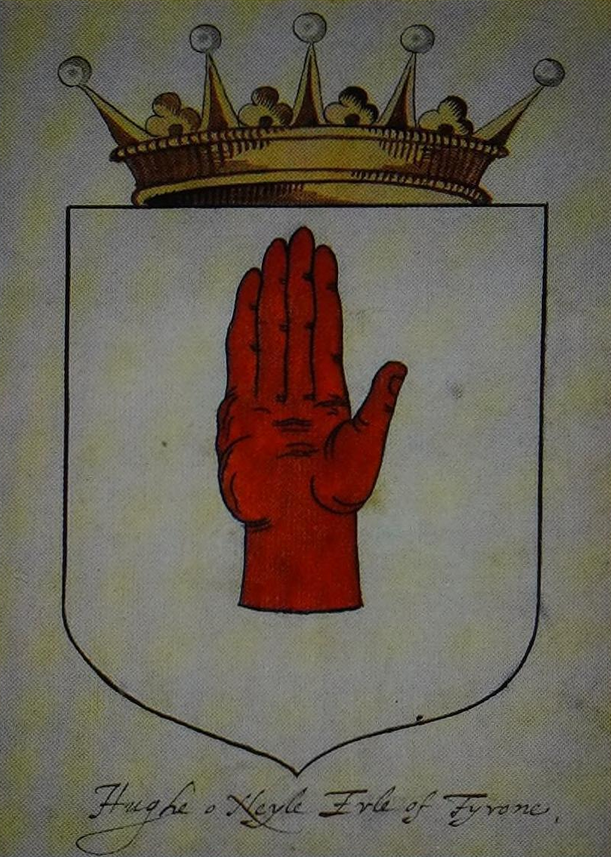
Arms of Hugh O'Neill, Earl of Tyrone, which features the Red Hand of Ulster

On 30 June 1585, he attended the Irish House of Lords in Dublin, where he was recognised as the Earl of Tyrone. In 1587, he successfully persuaded Elizabeth I to grant him letters patent to the lands of Tír Eoghain. (Note: His patent was confirmed on 10 May 1587. This also confirmed his son Hugh as the successive 4th Baron Dungannon.) From 1587, the Crown grew suspicious of Tyrone and began attempts at curbing his growing power. Although Elizabeth I asserted herself as "Queen of Ireland" and recognised Tír Eoghain as merely an earldom, it was in practice a sovereign entity and the most powerful Gaelic polity in Ireland. In the mid-1590s, Elizabeth I characterised Tyrone as "a creature of our own"—a noble raised as an Englishman who had nonetheless turned his back on the English court in favour of political independence. In 1597, Tyrone countered that the queen had given him only what he was owed, and he "ascribed the things which he had gotten to his own scratching in the world than Her Majesty's goodness". During this period, Tyrone regularly bribed government officials, developed alliances with Gaelic clans, and relied on his extensive web of connections.

=== Working with the Crown ===
Per an arrangement with the Crown, Tyrone agreed to defend the Pale's borders from fellow Ulstermen in exchange for soldiers. This arrangement allowed him to extend his influence over southeastern Ulster. He assisted English forces during the Second Desmond Rebellion and had government footsoldiers readily available to him. Though the Pale gentry disliked Tyrone, they became dependent on his services to maintain order in Ireland, particularly as he threatened Turlough and the MacShanes. In December 1580, Arthur Grey praised Tyrone as "the only Irish nobleman that hath done any service and drawn blood since my coming". Tyrone was nicknamed "The Queen's O'Neill" for his loyalty to the Crown. Nevertheless, he presumably feared that the government might weaken his power by appointing a sheriff in Tír Eoghain.

=== Spanish Armada ===
In late 1588, 23 ships of the Spanish Armada were lost on Ireland's coast. Lord Deputy William FitzWilliam ordered the execution of Spanish survivors. Tyrone sent his mercenary forces to Kinnagoe Bay in Inishowen to massacre the survivors of La Trinidad Valencera, in order to keep in the government's good graces. However, his response to the Armada is unclear as he himself assisted three Spanish noblemen and many commoners from the shipwrecks at Streedagh Strand in County Sligo. He may have been playing a double game. Tyrone rescued ordinary seaman Pedro Blanco of La Juliana, who was kept on as his footman throughout the whole of the Nine Years' War, and also helped stranded nobleman Don Antonio Manrique escape Ulster. Ultimately about a dozen Spaniards remained in Ireland, as despite their desire to return home, Philip II of Spain believed they would be of better use as emissaries for Tyrone.

=== O'Donnell clan alliance ===
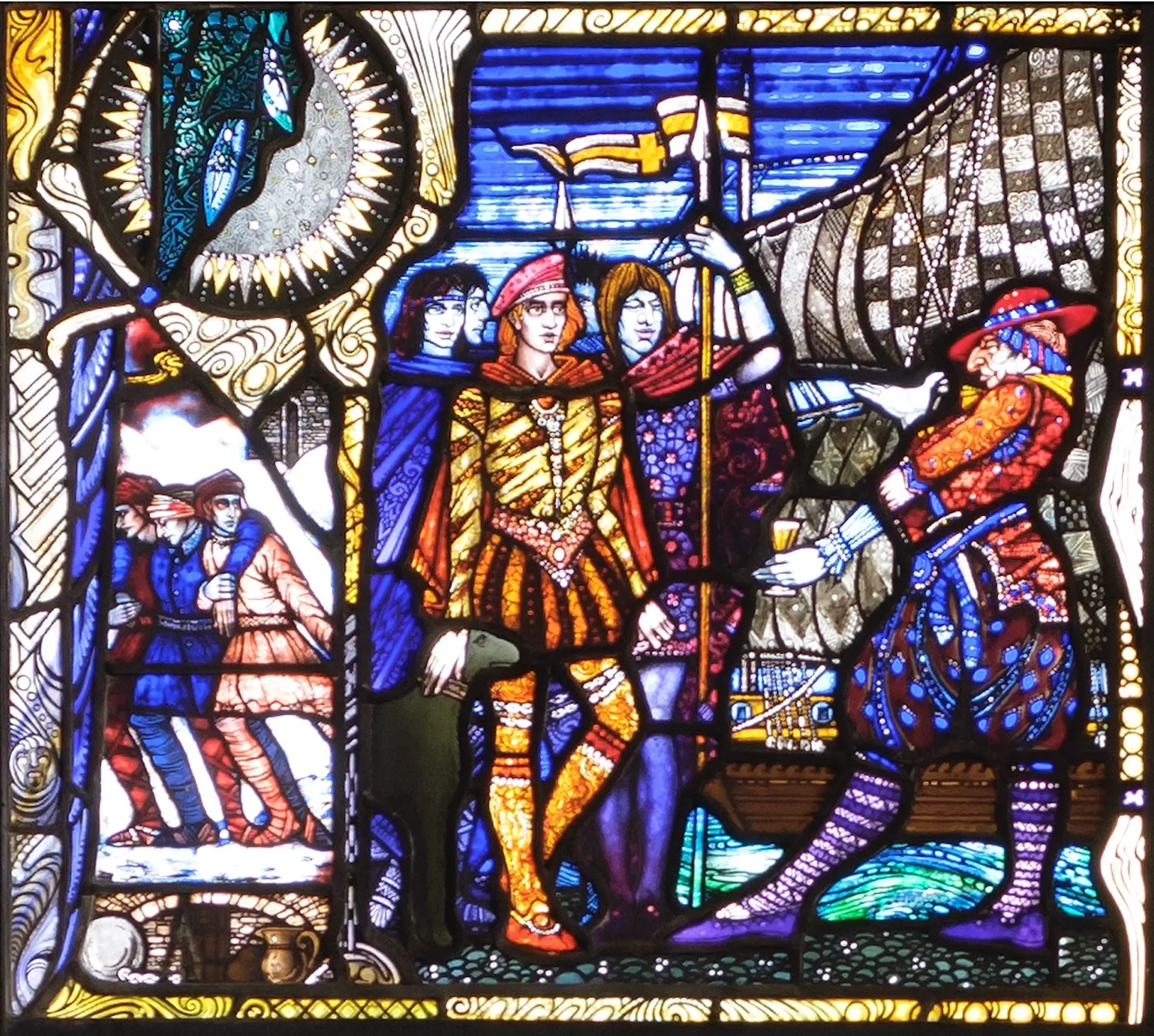
Hugh Roe O'Donnell of Tyrconnell was a major ally to Tyrone in the Nine Years' War.

Tyrone further developed his alliance with the O'Donnell clan—by 1587 his daughter Rose was betrothed to tanist Hugh Roe O'Donnell, which outraged Turlough. Via this alliance, Tyrone was able to secure Scottish mercenaries to fight the MacShanes. Lord Deputy John Perrot feared this alliance would threaten government control over Ulster, so in September 1587 he had young O'Donnell kidnapped by merchants. O'Donnell was imprisoned in Dublin Castle, along with two MacShanes, Art and Henry. Tyrone lobbied for O'Donnell's release, describing the ordeal as "the most prejudice that might happen unto me".

The O'Donnell clan's military power was key to Tyrone's ambitions to overthrow Turlough. In summer 1590, Conn MacShane O'Neill alleged that Tyrone "did lay down a plot and practised the escape of Hugh Roe" from prison. O'Donnell made a failed prison break attempt in January 1591. The same month, Tyrone's wife Siobhán (Hugh Roe's elder half-sister) died. In December 1591, Tyrone successfully aided O'Donnell's (and ironically, the MacShanes') escape by bribing officials—most likely Lord Deputy FitzWilliam. Henry MacShane split from the others in Dublin; O'Donnell and Art MacShane fled to the Wicklow Mountains to seek shelter with Tyrone's ally Fiach McHugh O'Byrne. O'Byrne's search party found the two men buried in snow and close to death. O'Donnell recovered from frostbite and was inaugurated as O'Donnell clan chief in April 1592. Art MacShane died in the mountains, fueling speculation that Tyrone had O'Byrne's party kill Art MacShane when they found him. It is more likely however that Art MacShane died of exposure. Henry MacShane was later reincarcerated by Tyrone in Ulster.

=== Bagenal family ===
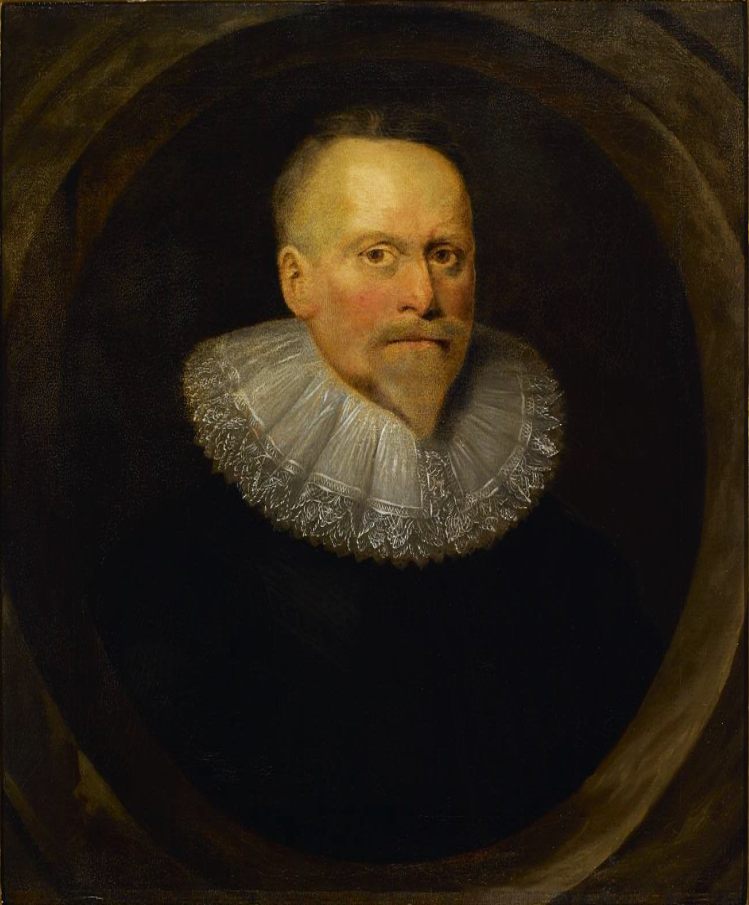
Tyrone had a polarising relationship with Nicholas Bagenal's children—marrying Mabel but becoming "arch-enemy" to Henry.

In his pursuit of power and land, Tyrone also had to contend with Nicholas Bagenal, the Marshal of the Queen's Irish Army. In 1589 Nicholas Bagenal described Tyrone "as so allied by kindred in blood and affinity as also by marriages and fosters and other friendships as if he should be ill-disposed might hap put the crown of England to more charges than the purchase of Ulster should be worth". On 24 October 1590, his son Henry Bagenal succeeded him as Marshal. In autumn 1590, Gaelic lord Hugh Roe MacMahon was executed on FitzWilliam's orders; MacMahon's land was confiscated, divided and allotted to English servitors rather than the Gaelic Irish. Tyrone, who had owned part of MacMahon's lands under brehon law, was passed over in favour of Henry Bagenal. Furthermore, Tyrone's authority was directly challenged when Henry was named chief commissioner of Ulster on 18 May 1591.

Soon afterwards, Tyrone began to woo Mabel, Henry's twenty-year-old younger sister. This was only months after the deaths of Nicholas Bagenal and Tyrone's late wife Siobhán in February and January respectively. Tyrone professed his love and asked for Mabel's hand in marriage. Alarmed, Henry Bagenal kept Mabel out of Tyrone's reach by sending her to live with their brother-in-law Patrick Barnewall in Turvey. Nevertheless, Tyrone found excuses to visit Mabel, and in July he convinced her to elope. After a dinner at Turvey, the Earl distracted Barnewall while his ally William Warren escorted Mabel to Warren's house in Drumcondra. Tyrone wanted a Protestant ceremony so that the marriage would be recognised by English law, and so Protestant Bishop of Meath Thomas Jones was summoned. Jones was reluctant to perform the marriage, but after being assured of Mabel's free consent, and for the sake of her reputation, the couple were married on 3 August 1591.

Jerrold Casway notes that this "whirlwind courtship" is unlike Tyrone's other marriages, which otherwise always had political motives. Mabel has been dubbed the "Helen of the Elizabethan Wars", a sobriquet that historians decry as being overly simplistic. It is possible Tyrone's judgment was impaired by his feelings, but historians generally believe that Tyrone would have recognised the advantages of marrying into the powerful Bagenal family. The marriage was his attempt to merge the Bagenals' interests with his own and to neutralise Henry Bagenal's growing power.

Henry Bagenal was outraged. He refused to pay his sister's £1000 dowry, even two years after the marriage, and had Tyrone's previous divorce investigated, though it was found to be valid. Because of this dramatic episode and their roles as opposing commanders during the Nine Years' War, Bagenal and Tyrone have been called "arch-enemies", "nemeses" and "arch-rivals".

=== Clashes with the MacShanes ===
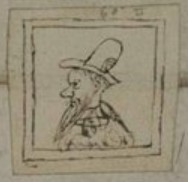
1574 sketch of Turlough Luineach O'Neill in the State Papers

It is clear that Tyrone aspired to the position of O'Neill clan chief. In March 1583, news spread that Turlough had died. Tyrone rushed to Tullyhogue Fort, the ancient ceremonial site where the O'Neill chiefs were traditionally inaugurated. It turned out that Turlough had not died but had only fallen into a brief coma from alcohol poisoning. Tyrone's constant disputes with Turlough were utilised by the government to weaken the O'Neill clan. In 1584, Tyrone and Turlough were at Strabane to celebrate Easter together. The Dublin government was extremely alarmed at this news and feared that the O'Neill rivalry may be dissolving. By 1587, Turlough had established an alliance with the MacShanes. Tyrone and Hugh McManus O'Donnell launched an attack on Turlough in 1588, but they were defeated at Carricklea to the satisfaction of Perrot.

In January 1590, Tyrone organised the execution of his MacShane cousin Hugh Gavelagh, who had exposed to FitzWilliam that he was making treasonous dealings with the Spanish. When the MacShanes refused to submit to Tyrone in exchange for Gavelagh's life, Tyrone had Gavelagh hanged at Dungannon by public executioners. (Note: It has been claimed that, because the local population were sympathetic to the MacShanes, a local executioner could not be found, so a man from outside Tír Eoghain had to be brought in to carry out Gavelagh's hanging. At the time, it was reputed that Tyrone had hanged Gavelagh over a tree with his bare hands.) Tyrone proceeded to London where he sufficiently defended himself against England's Privy Council by alleging that Gavelagh was guilty of various crimes. Tyrone was placed under house arrest but released by letters of commendation from FitzWilliam and the Dublin government.

After Hugh Roe O'Donnell's inauguration as O'Donnell clan chief, Tyrone and O'Donnell executed a pincer movement against Turlough. With an overwhelming alliance against him, in May 1593 Turlough was forced to surrender his lordship of Tír Eoghain and name Tyrone as his tanist. Turlough would receive a pension of £2,000 and the right to officially remain O'Neill chief until his death. The Earl had effectively become the ruler of Tír Eoghain.

== Proxy war, 1593–1594 ==
=== Maguire's revolt ===
By late 1592, the Crown's advances into Gaelic territory, as well as the recent executions of chieftains MacMahon (in 1590) and Brian O'Rourke (in 1591) had created a fierce resentment in the Gaelic nobility and Irish Catholic clergy. In early April 1593, English captain Humphrey Willis was appointed by FitzWilliam as Sheriff of Fermanagh; he entered the kingdom with at least 100 men and began pillaging and raiding, to the fury of Fermanagh's chieftain Hugh Maguire. Morgan states that this was a blatant move to weaken Tyrone's power by subjugating Maguire.

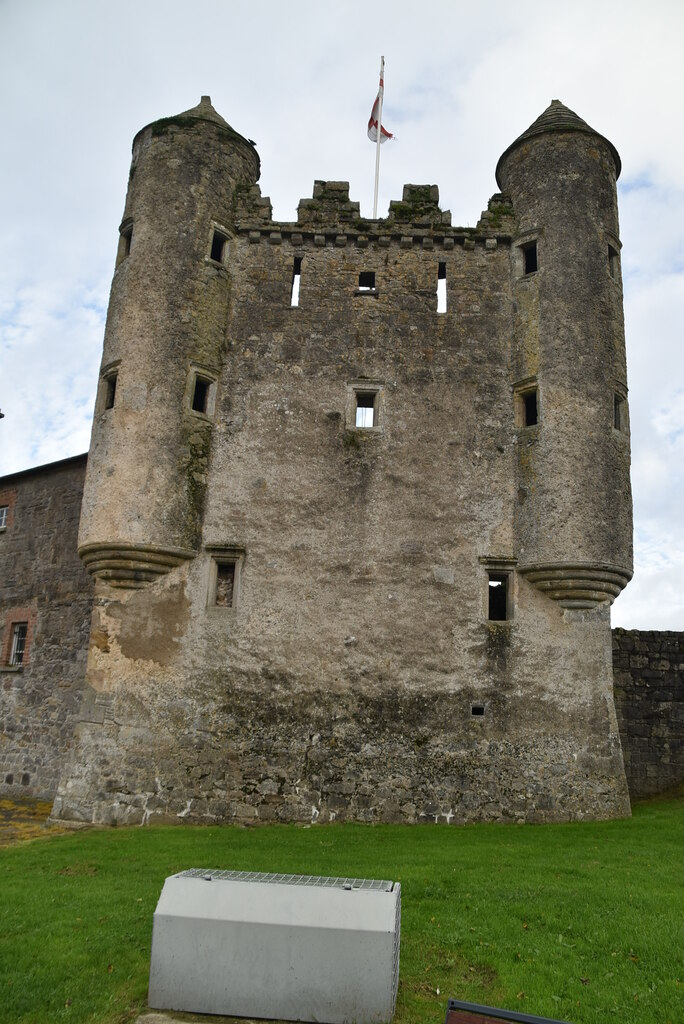
The Irish confederacy formed following a meeting at Enniskillen Castle.

After Willis' first offensive, a meeting took place at Enniskillen Castle on 8 May, with O'Donnell, Maguire and Brian Oge O'Rourke present. The Sheriff of Monaghan alleged that Tyrone also attended the meeting. The noblemen were assembled by Edmund MacGauran, a Catholic Archbishop recently returned from Spain with promises that Philip II would support oppressed Irish Catholics if they proved themselves by launching prior military action. MacGauran advised that the noblemen sign a letter addressed to Philip II which emphasised their oppression and which requested urgent reinforcements from the Spanish army. Tyrone did not sign MacGauran's letter. Catholic Archbishop James O'Hely was tasked with delivering the confederates' messages—he met with Juan de Idiáquez, the royal secretary. Idiáquez's notes to Philip II reveal Tyrone's relationship with the emerging confederacy:

"The Irish archbishop of Tuam says that it will be of great importance for the success of the confederacy of Irish Catholics, that Your Majesty should write very affectionately to the earl of Tyrone, whose name is O'Neill to induce him to enter into the confederacy openly. He already belongs to it secretly, and he should be assured that Your Majesty's aid shall not fail them. The archbishop begs Your Majesty to order a letter to be written to the earl to that effect."

Maguire managed to obtain reinforcements which included 100 men led by Tyrone's brother Cormac MacBaron and 120 men under the commands of Tyrone's O'Hagan foster-brothers. Tyrone often used his relatives and followers to make war on his behalf and it is unlikely they would have assisted Maguire without Tyrone's permission. Willis and his men in a church took refuge in a church for about a week until Tyrone intervened and negotiated their safe rescue out of Fermanagh. This conflict is considered to mark the start of the Nine Years' War. Subsequently Maguire launched raids across Connacht. Tyrone's nephews—sons of his brother Art MacBaron—also engaged in campaigns against loyalist clans.

=== Motivations ===
It is certain Tyrone was involved in the events in Fermanagh and Connacht during 1593-4, but historians disagree as to his true motivations during this period. (Note: See McGinty 2013 for discussion on Tyrone's position in the confederacy.) Hiram Morgan represents Tyrone as a master strategist who was complicit in rebellion from the start but feigned loyalty to the Crown for strategic reasons. James O'Neill agrees that Tyrone was the chief architect of the rebellion, and states that the conflict in Fermanagh allowed Tyrone to divert English forces and thus suppress English clients in east Ulster. According to John Dorney, Tyrone originally distanced himself from the rebellions because he hoped to be appointed Lord President of Ulster by Elizabeth I, but she recognised Tyrone's ambitions to usurp her as Ireland's sovereign and refused to grant him provincial presidency or similar powers. Nicholas Canny similarly states that Tyrone aspired to be the "queen's man in Ulster", was passed over in favour of Henry Bagenal, and reluctantly pushed into rebellion to prevent his followers defecting to his brother Cormac MacBaron. Michael Finnegan suggests that Tyrone wanted to prevent war with the English, trying in vain to restrain his Irish allies, but was dragged into the war because his association with O'Donnell had corrupted his loyalist reputation. Darren McGettigan downplays Tyrone's role, stating that "while [Tyrone] was crucial to the confederacy, he did not build it, and may have been carried along by events and his own success, much more than some historians realise". McGettigan and Morgan disagree over Tyrone's prominence in the confederacy.

By the beginning of the Nine Years' War, Tyrone had formally allied with O'Donnell and Maguire via their marriages to his daughters. O'Donnell married Tyrone's daughter Rose in December 1592, and Maguire married Tyrone's daughter Margaret around May 1593. Around August 1593, Maguire stated to a spy that Tyrone had pushed him into rebellion and "promised to assist him and bear him out in his war". By April 1594, Geoffrey Fenton noted that the confederates "have secretly contracted a strong league amongst themselves, leaving out the name of the earl... to be an instrument to work for them when opportunity would serve". The English government had their suspicions that Tyrone was plotting against them, but he repeatedly proved his loyalty in battles against Irish uprisings. Per Idiáquez's notes to Philip II, the early confederates operated under the understanding that Tyrone belonged to their cause but publicly hid his true allegiance.

=== Allegations against Tyrone ===
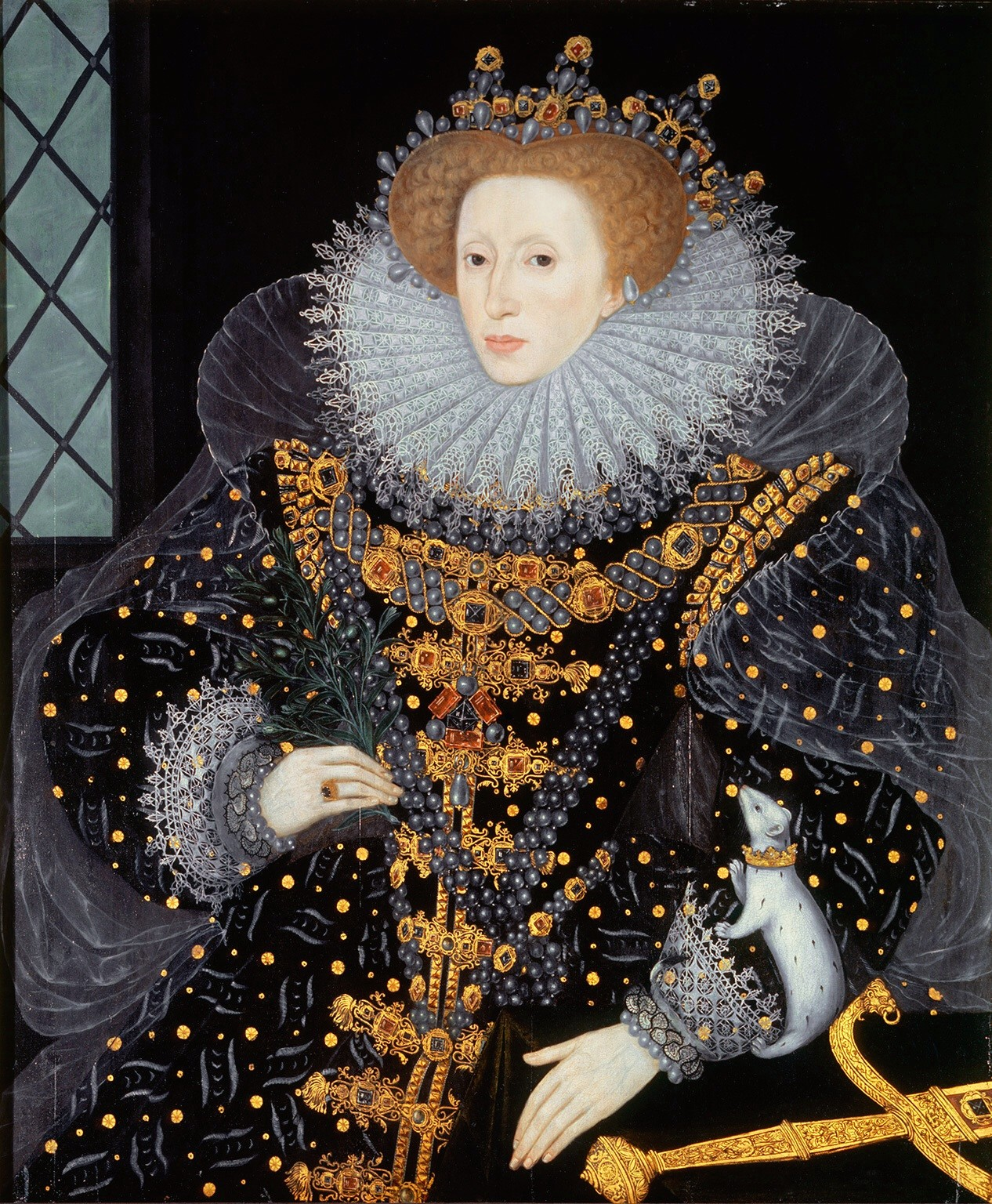
Queen Elizabeth I "would not willing deny any favour [to Tyrone], knowing his devotion to her".

On 14 May 1593, Phelim MacTurlough O'Neill, a client of Henry Bagenal, was assassinated by the O'Hagans, Tyrone's foster family. This murder enabled Tyrone to annex Killetra, which he had been attempting since the late 1580s. Tyrone was charged with involvement in the assassination. He swore his innocence, blamed it solely on the O'Hagans as a revenge murder, and accused the administration of manipulating the evidence against him. FitzWilliam had his doubts, but the council were satisfied.

By late April, there were more allegations against Tyrone from Irish lords Hugh McHugh Dubh O'Donnell and Hugh Magennis. FitzWilliam summoned Tyrone to Dublin, but Tyrone refused and made excuses, so the council went to Dundalk to confront him in person. During the proceedings, which occurred 14–28 June, the main charge was foreign conspiracy. FitzWilliam and Bagenal favoured the Earl's arrest. Three councillors were already well-disposed to Tyrone; the rest felt threatened by his power in Dundalk. Certain councillors feared Tyrone's arrest would only exacerbate the growing conflict in the north and could lead to a Gaelic invasion of the Pale. Ultimately Tyrone managed to avoid arrest. When Elizabeth I was later briefed on the proceedings, she concluded that Tyrone should have been arrested.

Tyrone met with Maguire in early August—within weeks Maguire launched raids into Monaghan.

=== Battle of Belleek ===
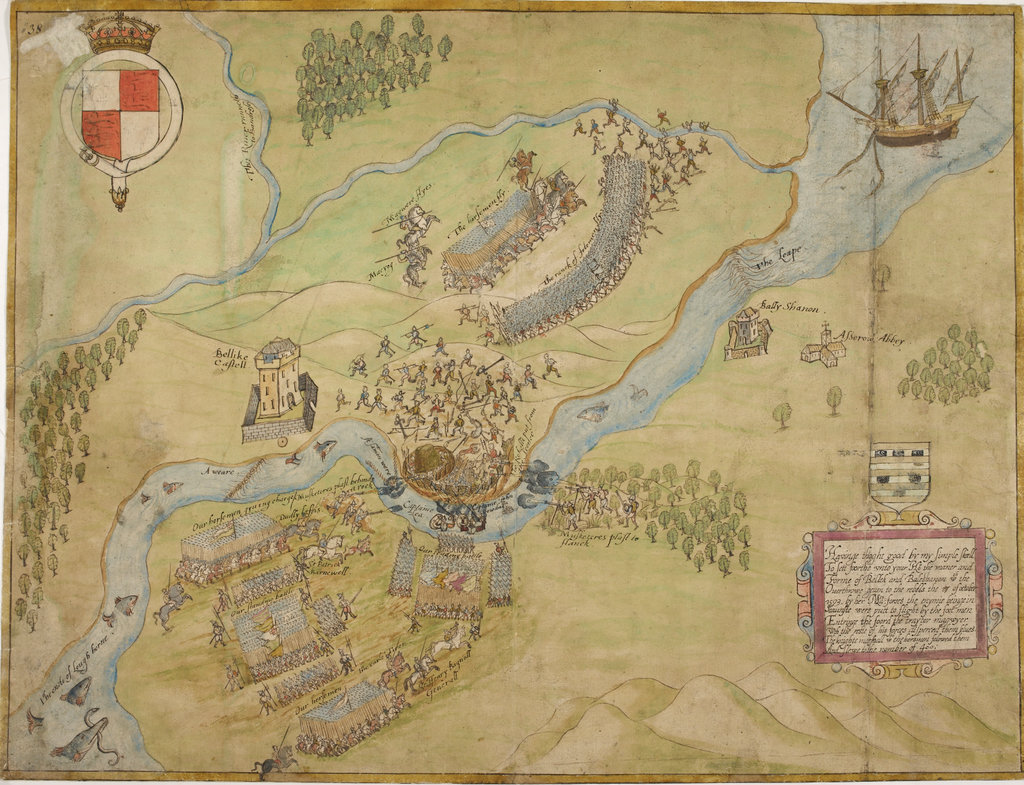
1594 drawing of the Battle of Belleek by John Thomas

Maguire's attacks provoked a large-scale military expedition to be led by Bagenal. Tyrone was able to deflect the past allegations and prove his loyalty to the Crown by agreeing to assist Bagenal. On 26 September he joined Bagenal and his army at Enniskillen, but the Earl had brought far fewer troops than he had promised. The two commanders detested each other and there was a nervous awkwardness between their troops. Bagenal proposed several plans of attack but these were all vetoed by Tyrone. On 7 October, they marched separately to the ford near Belleek.

Their combined forces moved on Maguire's positions on 10 October. O'Donnell was in nearby Ballyshannon when the battle was taking place, but he was ordered by Tyrone not to reinforce Maguire. It was estimated that 300 Irish soldiers were killed. Though Maguire's forces were not directly engaged, FitzWilliam was convinced Maguire's revolt had been stopped. During the battle Tyrone was speared in the leg; the wound served as physical proof of his loyalty to the authorities in Dublin. Bagenal remain suspicious of his brother-in-law and later received intelligence that Tyrone had advised Maguire prior to the battle. Tyrone protested against Bagenal's accusation by claiming that Bagenal and FitzWilliam were conspiring to rob him of the honour he was due.

=== Further allegations ===
More allegations emerged in 1594. Captain Willis, Sir Edward Herbert and Joan Kelly claimed Tyrone was ordering the Irish raids. He would apparently meet with confederate soldiers at Slieve Beagh under the pretense that he was going hunting. In March, it appeared that Tyrone was behind the burning of Bagenal's lands. The same month, following talks with Tyrone and other Ulster lords, government commissioners surmised that a confederacy had been established between the Ulster lords, and that Tyrone was the leader. Despite pressure from Tyrone to feign neutrality, O'Donnell joined Maguire in besieging Enniskillen Castle in early 1594. This signaled to the government O'Donnell's status as a confederate commander. O'Donnell pushed Tyrone into supplying further soldiers to the confederacy, by warning that "he must consider Tyrone his enemy, unless he came to his aid in such a pinch". Tyrone subsequently sent reinforcements under Cormac MacBaron to the Battle of the Ford of the Biscuits.

FitzWilliam was succeeded as Lord Deputy by William Russell, who was sworn in on 11 August. To the surprise of the council, Tyrone appeared in Dublin six days later to tender his submission. Tyrone admitted his failure to prevent the treasons of his followers, but the meeting was interrupted with Bagenal accusing Tyrone of disloyalty to the Crown. Most of the councillors were friendly with the earl, and to Bagenal's frustration, Russell allowed Tyrone to leave in safety. The queen was furious that Tyrone had not been arrested and she scolded Russell in private, denouncing it "as foul an oversight as ever committed in that kingdom".

== Open rebellion, 1595–1597 ==
=== Assault on the Blackwater Fort ===
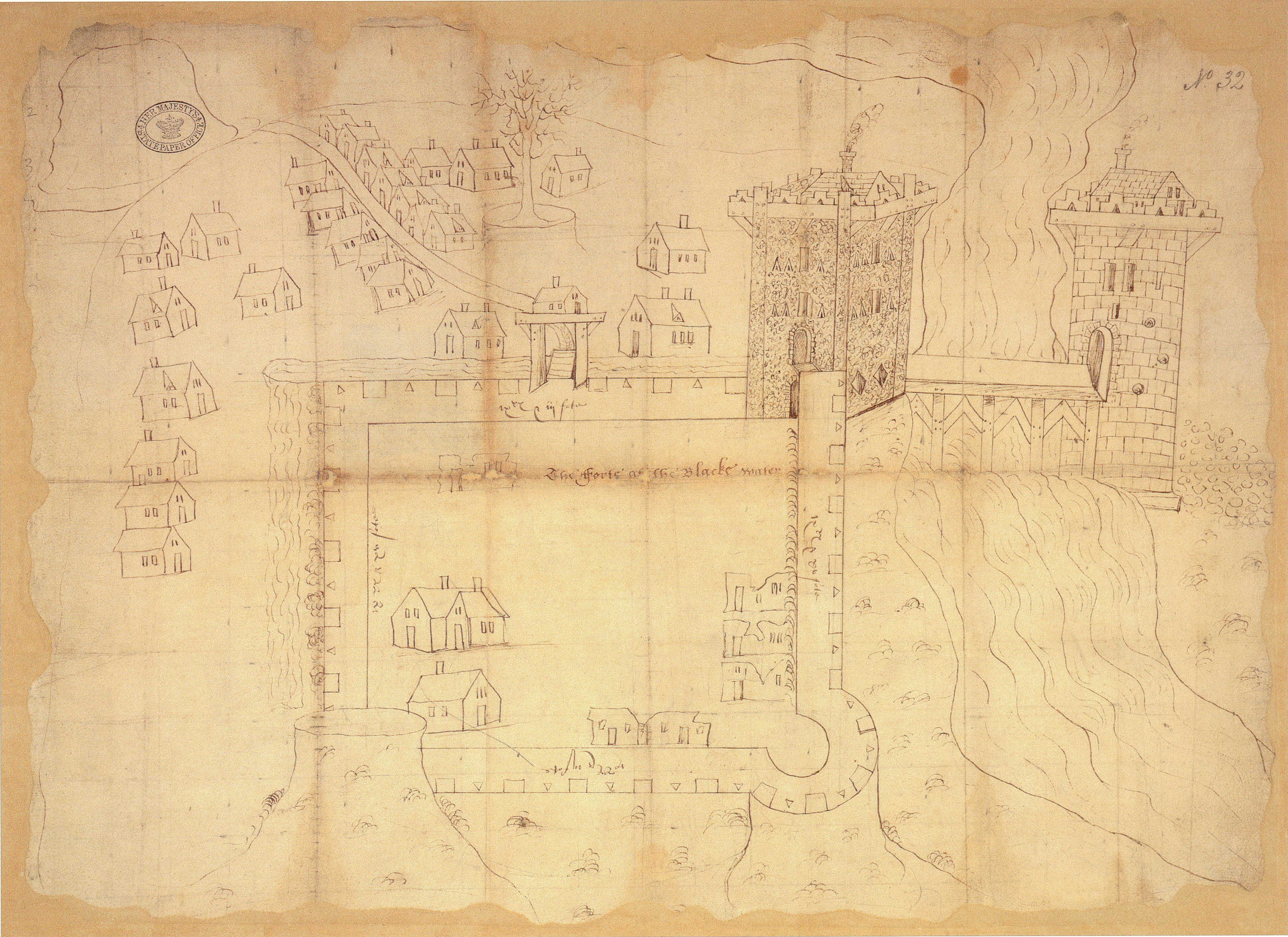
Tyrone went into open rebellion at the assault on the Blackwater Fort.

On 16 February 1595, Tyrone's brother Art MacBaron assaulted and captured the English-held Blackwater Fort in Blackwatertown. More significant however was the presence of Tyrone at the assault. The evidence against Tyrone became too great to ignore, and the government deemed an immediate attack essential. A considerable royal force arrived in Waterford on 19 March, but Tyrone had already managed to invade and burn Louth on 17 February. If Tyrone did not go into open rebellion once the English encroached onto Tír Eoghain, he may have risked estranging his followers and allowing Cormac MacBaron to oust him.

=== Battle of Clontibret ===
In May 1595, 1,750 English troops led by Bagenal were ambushed near Clontibret by an army led by Tyrone. The English column had been sent to relieve the besieged English garrison in Monaghan. The battle spanned multiple days as Bagenal's forces attempted to outrun Tyrone's. During the battle, Tyrone entered a melee with a cornet who had thrown him off his horse. An O'Cahan (possibly Donnell Ballagh O'Cahan) severed the cornet's arm then Tyrone stabbed him under the corslet.

In a report to the Lord Deputy, veteran soldier John Norris warned that the proficiency of the Irish rebels was far greater than expected: "their number greater, their arms better, and munition more plenty". The discipline and co-ordination of Tyrone's pike and shot technique caused extreme concern. Ralph Lane recorded 31 killed and 103 wounded, though he later admitted to concealing the true number of casualties. The Irish victory shocked the English and was a severe setback early in the war. On 24 June, Tyrone was proclaimed a traitor at Dundalk.

Upon Turlough's death, Tyrone travelled to Tullyhogue Fort where on 15 September he was officially inaugurated as O'Neill clan chief. Tyrone was the last inaugurated chief of the O'Neill clan, and he appointed Cormac MacBaron as his tanist. According to Norris, "the coming to the place of [clan chief] hath made [Tyrone] much prouder and harder to yield to his duty, and he flattereth himself much with the hope of foreign assistance."

=== Peace treaty negotiations ===
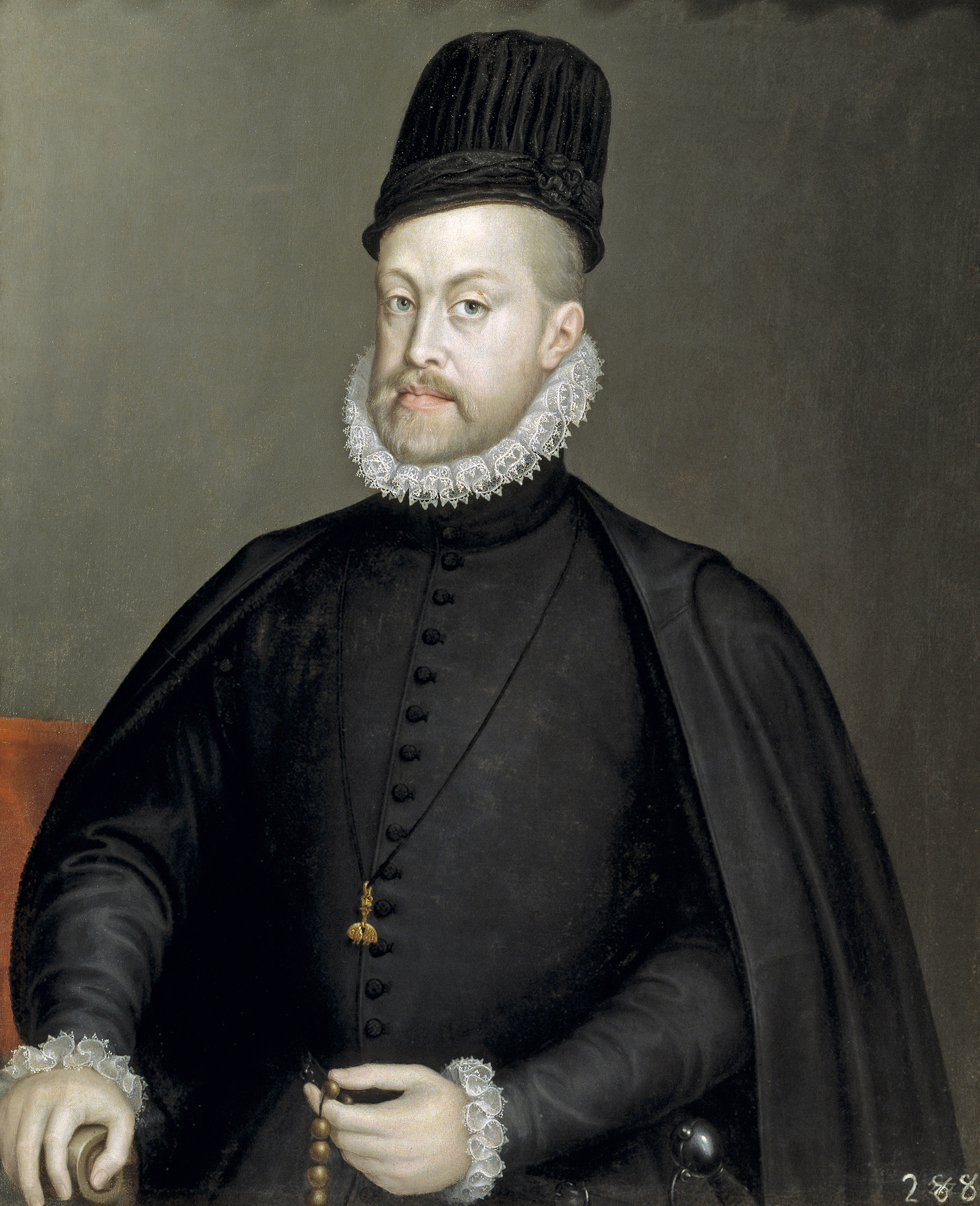
Tyrone repeatedly requested Philip II's assistance throughout the Nine Years' War.

Tyrone and O'Donnell opened communications with Philip II and his general Juan del Águila. In letters to the king—intercepted by English forces in September—they promoted themselves as champions of the Roman Catholic Church. They also offered Philip II the kingdom of Ireland in return for military support. It had long been suspected that Tyrone was in league with the Spanish but this was the English government's first piece of hard evidence. In fact Philip II had sent a ship to Ireland in March 1594 for the purpose of gathering intelligence, but the crew died in a shipwreck off Biscay.

Tyrone sought to delay the war in order to buy time for the arrival of Spanish troops. In September 1595, he sent overtures of submission to the Crown, and a ceasefire was enacted whilst the settlement could be negotiated. This timing was advantageous to the Crown, as the queen's Irish Army was facing shortages of manpower and supplies. After the discovery of the confederacy's letters to Spain, Elizabeth I emphasised the urgency of completing negotiations to her commissioners. Tyrone wore down commissioners by repeatedly objecting to their conditions. He eventually signed a cessation of arms on 27 October. This pardoned certain confederates and give them local autonomy. It also acknowledged a tolerance of Catholicism. The confederacy proved to be unsatisfied with these terms, but ultimately Tyrone successfully managed to defer all-out war for more than two years.

Tyrone's wife Mabel died in December 1595. The same month, Tyrone's partnership with O'Donnell came under strain as Rose had not born O'Donnell children. With Tyrone's consent, O'Donnell separated from Rose in hopes of a marriage alliance with the daughter of the neutral 3rd Earl of Clanricarde. This plan came to naught. Tyrone sent his secretary Henry Hovenden into Tyrconnell to handle the situation, and O'Donnell eventually took Rose back.

=== Relations with Spain and 1597 ceasefire ===
Further negotiations to develop a peace treaty were almost complete by May. In April 1596, Philip II sent three ships to Ireland to exhort the confederates to continue the war against England. Spanish captain Alonso Cobos arrived at Tyrconnell in May and dined with the confederates at Lifford. Following a secret talk between Cobos and Tyrone, O'Donnell and Cormac MacBaron, the Irishmen agreed to abandon the peace treaty and become vassals of Philip II. Tyrone and O'Donnell also petitioned Philip II to make Albert VII, Archduke of Austria, the new Catholic monarch of Ireland. After these developments, Tyrone and O'Donnell began to deliberately derail peace negotiations and provoke war in previously peaceful parts of the country. It became clear to the government that Tyrone intended the war to encompass all of Ireland.

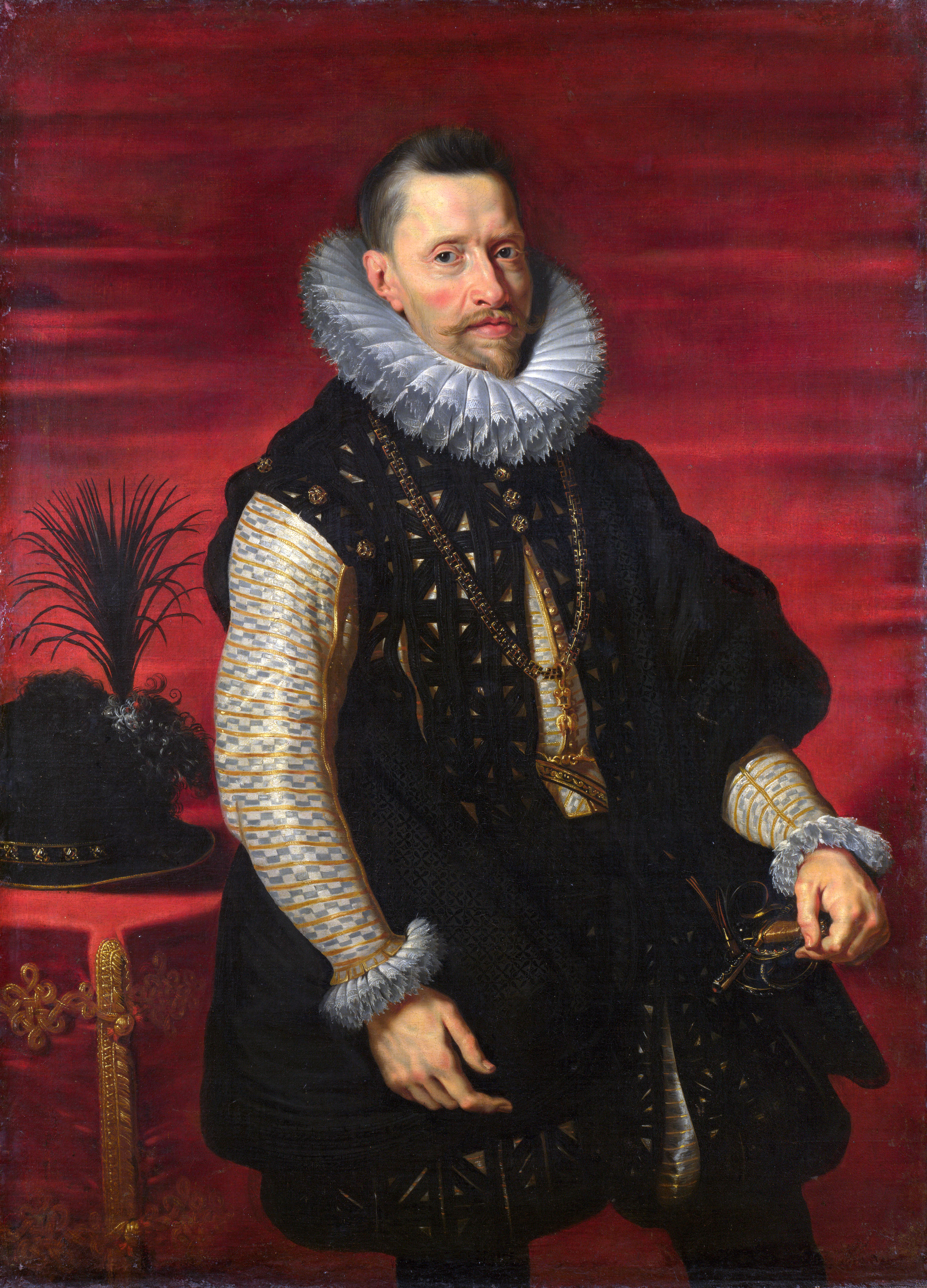
Tyrone sought to make Albert VII Ireland's new Catholic sovereign.

Tyrone declared to the government that he and O'Donnell had rejected further meetings with the Spanish, and he submitted Philip II's letter as a show of transparency. However, Philip II soon learned of Tyrone's maneuver and was indignant at this breach of trust. In defense, Tyrone shifted blame onto his secretary. Tyrone's strategy became more combative once he received promises that a large-scale Spanish military expedition would be incoming. He imported regular shipments of munitions and his ally Fiach McHugh O'Byrne engaged in a series of skirmishes against Russell's troops. Tyrone intentionally gave the government the impression that peace was imminent as misdirection from the impending Spanish expedition. After much delay, the 2nd Spanish Armada finally sailed from Lisbon in October 1596. Unfortunately for Tyrone, the armada ended in failure when it was met with a sudden storm which claimed over 3,000 lives. In a parley with Norris in January 1597, Tyrone admitted to writing letters to Spain but placed blame partly on O'Donnell. He agreed to a further parley in March but later made excuses to postpone it.

Thomas Burgh, 3rd Baron Burgh, took over as Lord Deputy on 22 May. Burgh refused to entertain Tyrone's excuses and launched a two-pronged attack on Tyrone and O'Donnell's territories. Burgh captured the Blackwater fort in mid-July, forcing Tyrone's men to withdraw to Drumflugh and Tobermessan. Royal forces also raided Dungannon and burned some of Tyrone's mills. Tyrone established a southern blockade to stop royal forces from resupplying the fort, and on 2 October made a failed attempt to scale the fort. Three days later, Burgh left the fort with 1,700 men to source supplies from Armagh. He died from illness the following week.

It was anticipated that Tyrone would seize this opportunity to overrun the Pale. Instead he requested a truce to facilitate peace negotiations. On 8 December, Tyrone submitted to Lord Lieutenant-General Thomas Butler, 10th Earl of Ormond. Negotiations took place from 20–23 December in open country near Dundalk. Tyrone promised not to obstruct the resupply missions to the Blackwater fort and to avoid corresponding with foreign rulers (this alluded to James VI of Scotland as well as Philip II). He also insisted that no peace agreement would be made until his fellow confederates' grievances were addressed. Elizabeth I was consternated on receiving a list of confederate grievances and demands, but was willing to offer some concessions as well as a pardon for Tyrone. An eight week truce was agreed on. Tyrone once again used this time to stall the English and gain the upper hand.

In early 1598, administrator Conyers Clifford induced various confederates (most notably founding member Brian Oge O'Rourke) to defect to the Crown. O'Rourke's betrayal "did amaze Tyrone"—he became paranoid and temporarily arrested various confederate clan chiefs, including Hugh Maguire. Many of the turncoats rejoined the confederacy in fear after O'Donnell executed their men.

== Large-scale rebellion, 1598–1603 ==
=== Battle of the Yellow Ford ===
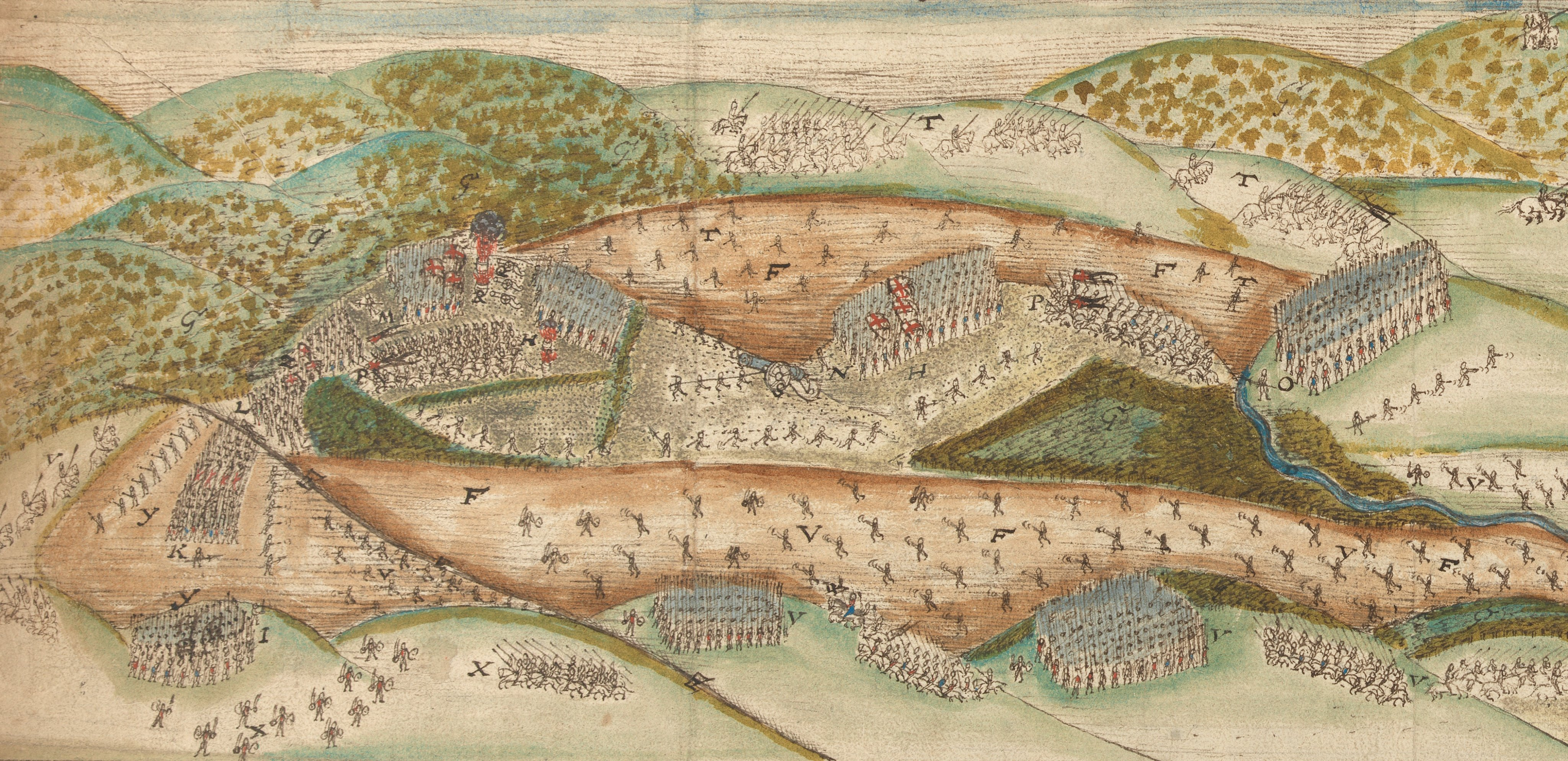
Illustration of the Battle of the Yellow Ford

Government commissioners abandoned negotiations by spring 1598, recognising that O'Donnell and Tyrone were intentionally impeding the peace process. When the truce expired in June, Tyrone resumed hostilities by besieging the Blackwater Fort. Bagenal, motivated by his animosity towards Tyrone, advocated to lead an army to relieve the fort. On 14 August, whilst crossing the River Callan, Bagenal's army was attacked by the combined forces of Tyrone, O'Donnell and Maguire. The confederates had prepared ditches in the ground to obstruct the enemy. Half of Bagenal's 4,000 men were killed, including Bagenal himself, who was struck by a bullet after lifting his visor.

The confederacy's success at the battle was the greatest victory by Irish forces against England, and it sparked a general revolt throughout the country, particularly in Munster. Tyrone has been criticised for failing to immediately capitalise on his victory, however it is possible he sustained heavy losses from the battle. One estimate puts Irish losses at the battle of the Yellow Ford at around 200 killed. News of the battle spread across western Europe, prompting Philip II to send a congratulatory letter to the confederates. Unfortunately for Tyrone, Philip II died the following month; he was succeeded by his son Philip III.

=== Essex in Ireland ===
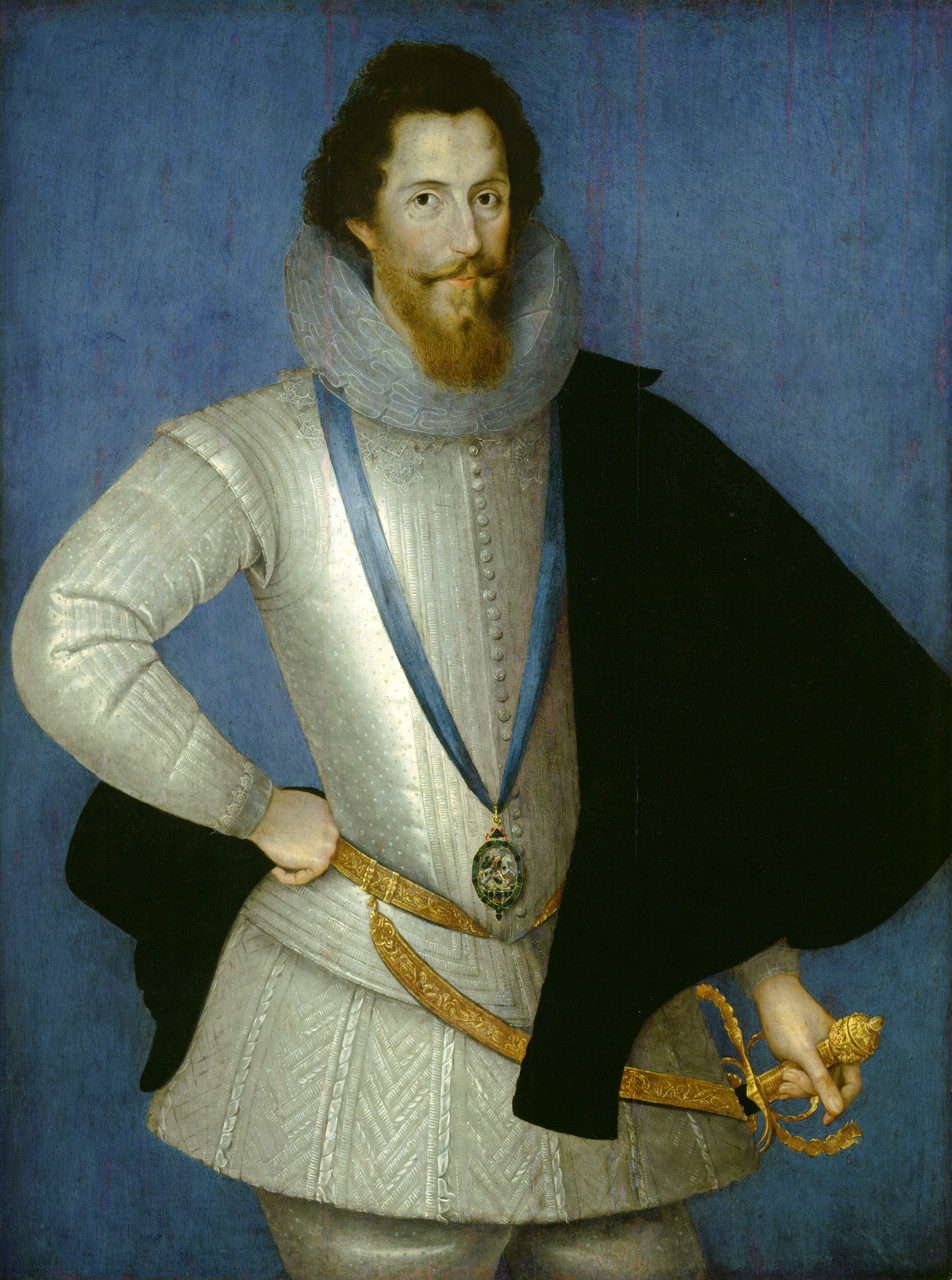
Robert Devereux, 2nd Earl of Essex, commander of the failed Irish campaign

After much hesitation, Elizabeth I selected her royal favourite Robert Devereux, 2nd Earl of Essex, as the new Lord Deputy. Essex had an existing connection with Ireland and Tyrone, as his father Walter Devereux was one of Tyrone's early allies. In a letter prior to his arrival in Ireland, he declared his intentions as Lord Deputy: "by God, I will beat Tyrone in the field, for nothing worthy of her Majesty's honour hath yet been achieved".

Essex landed in Ireland on 15 April 1599 with an expeditionary force of 17,000 troops and 1,500 horses—the largest English army dispatched to the country. Despite his resources, Essex's campaign proved to be a disaster. Many royal soldiers died from sickness and in battle. The confederates felt the English threat had weakened enough that they could safely travel with their wives—Tyrone's fourth wife Catherine Magennis, whom he had married in 1597, was present at his camp in June 1599 during her first pregnancy. In late August, Essex left for Ulster to confront Tyrone, having been heavily berated by the queen. Tyrone lightly skirmished with Essex's forces as the latter approached the borders of Ulster. Essex's numbers had dwindled to only 4,500 and Tyrone, whose army far outnumbered Essex's, refused to give battle. Tyrone sent an envoy on 5 September to request a parley, and Essex stubbornly agreed only after Tyrone had asked three times.

On 7 September, at the ford of Bellaclinthe on the River Lagan, Tyrone met Essex for a half-hour parley. Tyrone waded his horse into the river whilst Essex stayed on the bank. Tyrone praised Essex's late father and claimed he was willing to obtain peace from the new Lord Deputy. Tyrone would not give anything in writing, claiming that he feared Spain would cease their alliance with Ireland if evidence appeared that he was negotiating with England. He once again demanded liberty of conscience, to Essex's contempt, and also demanded a single treaty wherein the Crown would restore confiscated Irish lands to their former owners. Essex was not familiar with Tyrone's wily nature and gullibly accepted these proposals. Because their parley was conducted privately, out of earshot of their armies, Essex was later accused of conspiring with Tyrone to seize the thrones of England and Ireland. These accusations are far-fetched and obviously defamatory. (Note: When the spy James "Spanish" Blake was interrogated by Irish and Spanish officials in 1602, he claimed that he had acted as an intermediary between Tyrone and Essex during this supposed conspiracy to overthrow Elizabeth I.)

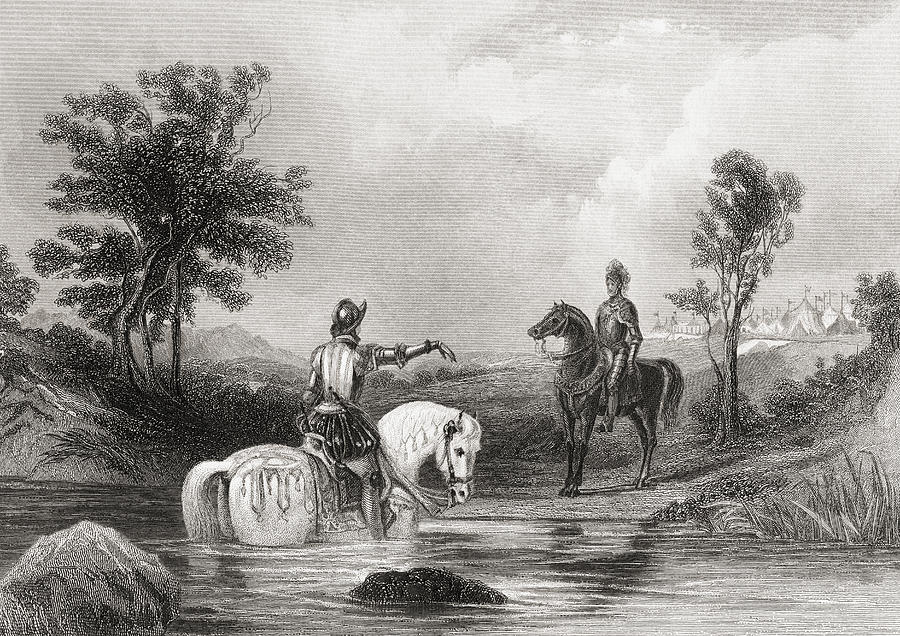
Nineteenth-century depiction of Essex and Tyrone's meeting

A more formal meeting occurred later that day with six witnesses on each side attending. Ultimately an informal truce of six weeks was arranged. Essex left Ireland on 24 September and was quickly placed under house arrest and removed from his post. Tyrone broke off the truce upon hearing of Essex's arrest. Following a failed uprising, Essex was eventually executed for treason on 25 February 1601.

=== Faith and Fatherland campaign ===
On 5 November 1599, in a strong position after Essex's failed campaign, Tyrone issued a public proclamation declaring a holy war against non-Catholics. He sent a list of 22 proposed terms for a peace agreement to Queen Elizabeth, including a request on the status of future Lord Deputies. This amounted to accepting English sovereignty over Ireland as a reality while hoping for tolerance and a strong Irish-led administration. The Dublin government were frightened upon receiving the proclamation. It was decided that any further meetings would be unseemly and futile, and the proposal was ignored.

Tyrone's main goal was now to win over Ireland's English-speaking Catholic population (the "Old English"). Despite his previous apathy towards religion, Tyrone began to position himself as a champion for Catholicism in order to rally further Irishmen to his cause. He declared that "if [he] had to be king of Ireland without having the catholic religion, [he] would not the same accept". Tyrone gained a token of encouragement from Pope Clement VIII, who entitled him "Captain General of the Catholic Army in Ireland". In late 1599 and early 1600, the Earl was in Munster on pilgrimage. He supported the claim of James FitzThomas Fitzgerald (the Súgán Earl) to the Earldom of Desmond, and recognised Florence MacCarthy as the MacCarthy Mor at Inniscarra. However, the Munster expedition ended in failure when confederacy commander Maguire was shot and killed by royal forces during a reconnaissance mission near Cork. Maguire's death was a major loss to the confederacy and prompted Tyrone to abruptly return to Ulster. Ultimately Tyrone's religious rhetoric could not abolish the deep distrust the Old English had of the Gaelic Irish, and he looked again to Spanish intervention as a means of winning the war.

In April 1600, a Spanish ship arrived in Ireland bearing considerable supplies of munitions for the confederacy. Tyrone stimulated the Irish-Spanish alliance by sending his son Henry to Spain in April 1600. At this time controversial Jesuit James Archer operated as his representative at the Spanish court.

=== Baron Mountjoy ===
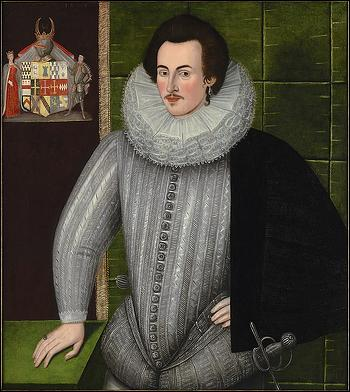
Under the leadership of Charles Blount, 8th Baron Mountjoy, the royal army greatly weakened the confederacy.

In February 1600, Charles Blount, 8th Baron Mountjoy, Essex's successor as Lord Deputy, arrived in Ireland. Mountjoy posed a major threat to Tyrone as he began immediately revitalising and restoring confidence in the royal army. He assigned commanders George Carew and Henry Docwra to north-west Ulster and Munster respectively. In May 1600 the Crown achieved a strategic breakthrough when Docwra, at the head of a considerable army, took up a position at Tyrone's rear in Derry. Docwra persuaded several unsatisfied confederacy members to defect to the Crown. These Irish turncoats, particularly Niall Garbh O'Donnell, Arthur O'Neill and Sean O'Doherty, emboldened the royal troops and allowed Docwra to significantly weaken Tyrone's forces.

In September, Tyrone blocked Mountjoy's forces from marching north past Faughart to erect a garrison in Armagh. After a two-week assault (known as the Battle of Moyry Pass), Mountjoy retreated to Dundalk. The English garrison was ultimately established in November once Tyrone had withdrawn further north. Mountjoy focused on destroying Tyrone's cattle and crops, which would damage the Earl's wealth and make him struggle to afford the paid mercenaries who made up the majority of his army.

=== Siege of Kinsale ===
As 1601 began, Philip III was focused on dispatching an expedition to Ireland in order to improve his position in the Anglo-Spanish War. In October 1601, a long-awaited armada from Spain occupied the port town of Kinsale under Spanish commander Juan del Águila. Tyrone was displeased at the small size of the force and the fact that they had landed in the south—moving his army there would mean leaving Ulster unprotected. Mountjoy rushed to contain the Spanish, but it was not until the beginning of November that Tyrone was able to put his army in motion. Tyrone and O'Donnell marched separately from the north, through territories defended by Carew, in the depths of a severe winter, gaining little support en route. Tyrone's army united with O'Donnell's at Bandon on 15 December.

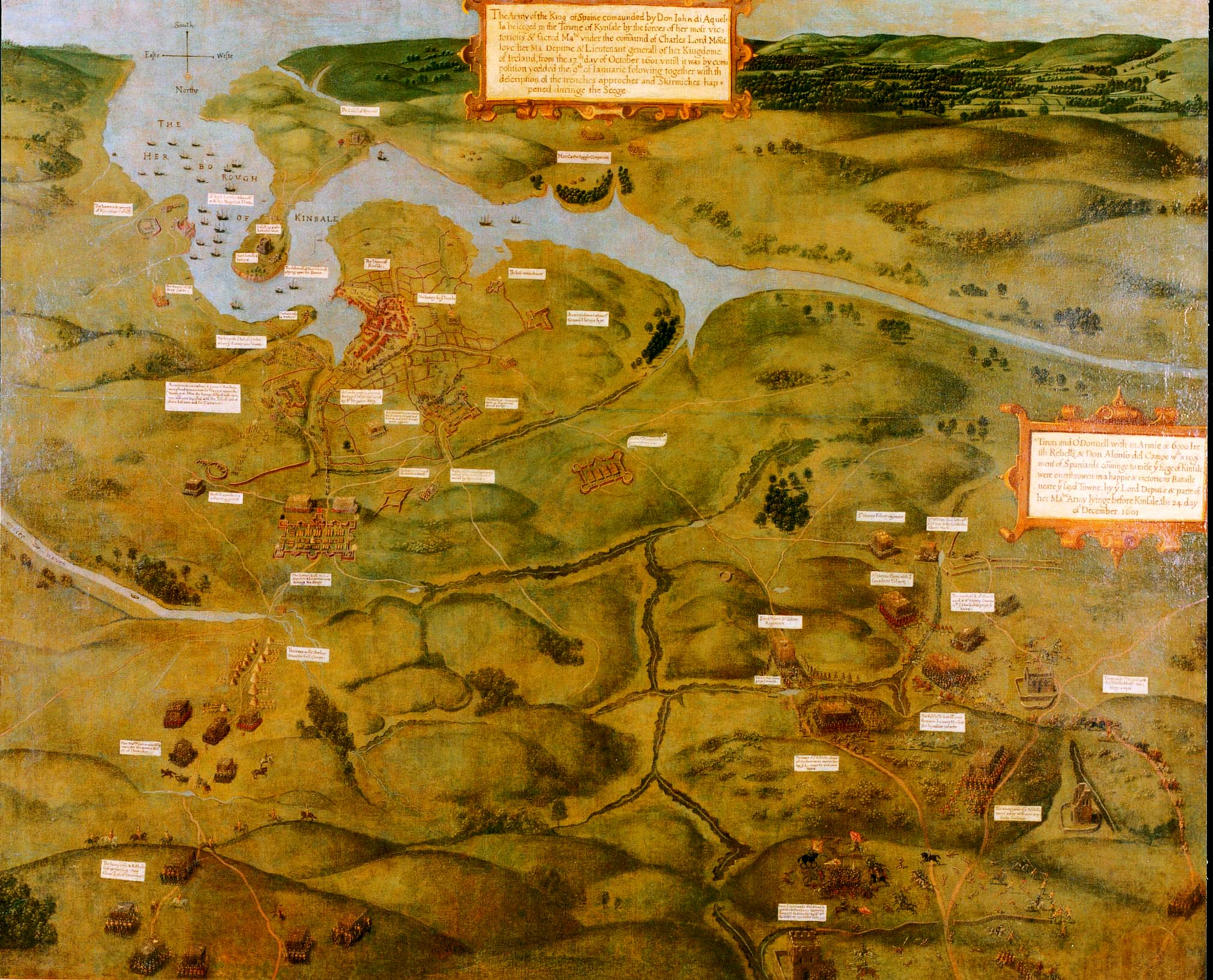
Map of the Siege of Kinsale

The Irish presence at Kinsale trapped the English army between the confederates and the Spaniards. Juan del Águila urged for a prompt combined attack on the English, but Tyrone and O'Donnell were apparently conflicted in their preferred strategy. According to Irish sources written in the 1620s, the brash O'Donnell convinced Tyrone to attack against his better judgement; this account is not unanimously accepted by historians. It is possible the story was retroactively developed to excuse the defeat at Kinsale, or perhaps was an attempt by biographer Lughaidh Ó Cléirigh to enhance O'Donnell's role in the war. O'Donnell had previously induced Tyrone into a full frontal assault in 1597, so this narrative is not out of the question. Morgan claims it was the pressure from the beleaguered Spaniards that wore down Tyrone, and that the confederates also had their reputations on the line. In any case, Tyrone abandoned his characteristically cautious military approach and resolved to make an immediate joint attack.

On the morning of 24 December 1601, Tyrone's force of 4,000 men took their position. Mountjoy spotted the soldiers and ordered an immediate attack. Tyrone retreated but Mountjoy's cavalry routed the fleeing soldiers. 1,200 men were killed and another 800 were wounded. The battle was a disaster for Tyrone and nullified years of his wartime success. He was strongly in favour of attempting another siege but was unable to persuade his surviving soldiers. The defeat at Kinsale was a fatal blow to the confederacy.

=== Peace settlement ===
O'Donnell left for Spain to seek further military assistance from Philip III. The confederate commanders separately returned to their territories. In the haste to leave Munster, 140 of Tyrone's men drowned while passing the Blackwater. Meanwhile the Crown's army swept the country. English forces began to close in on Tyrone—Mountjoy from the south, and Dowcra and Arthur Chichester from the north. Mountjoy destroyed the traditional O'Neill inauguration stone at Tullyhogue. With Queen Elizabeth in bad health, Tyrone may have been set on holding out until James VI of Scotland acceded to the English throne; he had diplomatic relations with James earlier in the war.

English forces destroyed crops and livestock in Ulster in 1601–1602, particularly in the lands of Tyrone's principal vassal (and son-in-law) Donnell Ballagh O'Cahan. This led to O'Cahan's surrender and withdrawal from Tyrone in July 1602, which drastically weakened the Earl's power. In June 1602 Tyrone burned his capital at Dungannon and retreated into the woods of Glenconkeyne. Despite O'Donnell's petitioning to Philip III, the promised Spanish fleet was repeatedly delayed due to a lack of resources. O'Donnell died in Simancas of a sudden illness on 30 August. The Spanish government subsequently abandoned plans to support the confederacy and instead sought a peace treaty with England.

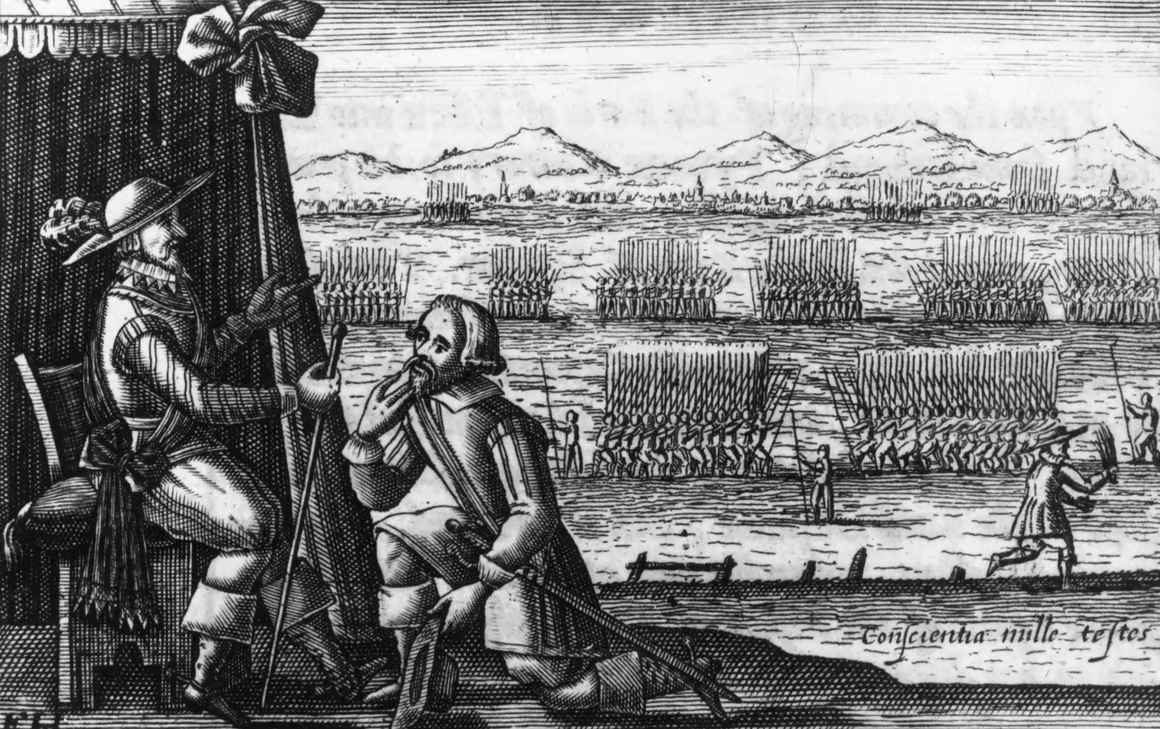
18th-century depiction of Tyrone's submission to Mountjoy

Mountjoy continued to pursue Tyrone to no avail. The Earl entered Fermanagh in autumn but was back in Glenconkeyne by December. He was able to rely on fellow Irish lords to provide him with provisions and intelligence. Whilst in Glenconkeyne, exactly a year after the defeat at Kinsale, Tyrone wrote to Philip III asking for a Spanish warship to be sent to Ulster. The royal army's use of scorched earth tactics led to famine across 1602–1603, with conditions so extreme that the local population were reduced to cannibalism. In January 1603, Mountjoy admitted to Lord Burghley that capturing the Earl would be up to chance, as despite his efforts he could not convince anyone to betray Tyrone.

On 22 December 1602, Tyrone offered his submission on his own terms, but this was firmly rejected by the queen. She insisted that Tyrone's title should be stripped from him and that his lands should be reduced. However with the queen on her deathbed, Mountjoy reopened negotiations with Tyrone in early 1603. Tyrone made his submission to Mountjoy on 30 March at Mellifont Abbey. He renounced his Gaelic title and his dependence on Spain, but was allowed to keep the title of Earl of Tyrone as well as most of his lands. These were particularly generous terms. The queen had died on 24 March but Mountjoy concealed this news to hasten negotiations. Tyrone followed Mountjoy to Dublin where he wept upon learning of the queen's death—if he had known, he could have negotiated more advantageous surrender terms. The remaining confederates followed suit in surrendering to the Crown. This marked the end of the Nine Years' War.

== Post-war, 1603–1607 ==
=== Restoration of lands ===
On 30 May 1603, Tyrone sailed to Holyhead with Mountjoy and Niall Garbh O'Donnell on their journey to meet Elizabeth's successor James I. As Tyrone traveled through Wales, widows of royal soldiers hurled "dirt and stones at the Earl... and [reviled] him with bitter words". Tyrone and Rory O'Donnell (Hugh Roe O'Donnell's younger brother) presented themselves at Hampton Court in London on 7 June. James I confirmed Tyrone in his title and core estates with a new patent. Tyrone was also bold enough to request the lord presidency of Ulster, but was only allowed lieutenancy of Tír Eoghain and Armagh. Rory was created 1st Earl of Tyrconnell. Many English courtiers were greatly incensed at the gracious reception the confederates received. (Note: Wormald notes that "it is impossible to imagine Elizabeth, at the end of the Nine Years' War, treating Tyrone and Tyrconnell as James did." Already reigning as King of Scotland, James believed he had a better understanding of Gaelic Irish culture than the Tudors since he had experience working with chiefs in the Scottish Highlands; he took a similar approach to diplomacy with the Irish. In general he was less prejudiced against Irish people than Elizabeth I. James also believed that independently-powerful lords were crucial to successfully run a large kingdom, of which Ireland was his third (after England and Scotland).) John Harington was outraged "to see that damnable rebel Tyrone brought to England, honoured, and well-liked... [He] now smileth in peace at those who did hazard their lives to destroy him". Tyrone even went hunting with the new king. Whilst Tyrone was in England, he sent a letter to Philip III offering to take up arms for Spain if peace negotiations between Spain and England failed.

Tyrone returned to Ireland in September 1603 and began rebuilding his estates, an easy task under the reserved government of Mountjoy's successor George Carey. O'Cahan's surrender to Docwra was under the promise that he would own his territory independently under English law. However, the Treaty of Mellifont's terms allowed Tyrone to retain his authority over these lands. Docwra pleaded for O'Cahan's case before the council, but Mountjoy sided with Tyrone. O'Cahan was forced to yield a third of his territory to the Earl, and was further frustrated by the harsh various levies and taxes Tyrone imposed to rebuild his wealth.

=== Hostility from English officials ===
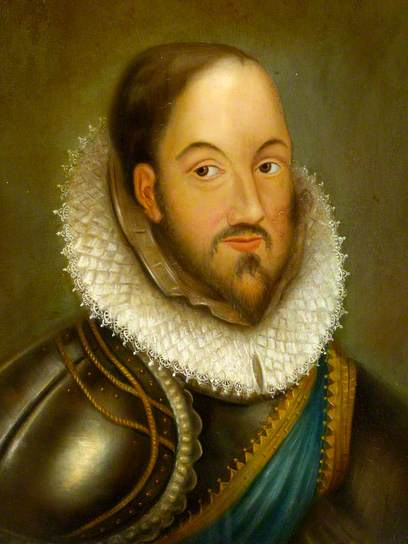
Lord Deputy Arthur Chichester's antagonism towards Tyrone was a contributing factor to the latter's flight.

Many English politicians and soldiers, who fought against Tyrone in the war, endeavoured to convince authorities that Tyrone was untrustworthy and required punishment for his continued treachery. Arthur Chichester, who became Lord Deputy in February 1605, had a markedly aggressive attitude towards the Gaelic lords. He abolished brehon law and removed the authority that senior lords had over junior nobles—making O'Cahan a freeholder with new legal rights. In October he banned Catholic clergy from Ireland and forced the population to attend Protestant church services. Chichester was also antagonistic to Tyrone, and he worked with John Davies, Attorney-General for Ireland, to accuse the Earl of treason. Indeed, Tyrone's continued correspondence with Spain broke his promises made at Mellifont. His marriage became strained and in December he considered a divorce from Catherine. Chichester sent officer Toby Caulfeild to recruit Catherine as a double agent, but she dismissed this out of hand.

Tyrone lost his political protection when Mountjoy died in April 1606. Davies and George Montgomery, the new Protestant Bishop of Derry, exacerbated the conflict between Tyrone and O'Cahan by encouraging O'Cahan to renew his suit against Tyrone. Davies prepared a case to prove that O'Cahan's lands were legally vested in the Crown, and he also acted as O'Cahan's counsel during the proceedings. O'Cahan received a loan from the Earl of Londonderry to fund his case. Montgomery also encouraged O'Cahan to leave his wife, Tyrone's daughter Rose (former wife of Hugh Roe O'Donnell), noting that "the breach between [O'Cahan] and his landlord [Tyrone] will be the greater by means of [Tyrone's] daughter". In March 1607 O'Cahan repudiated his marriage to Rose and before the end of the year he had married another woman, whilst still retaining Rose's dowry despite Tyrone's wishes. It is clear that government officials were harnessing O'Cahan's hostility to orchestrate Tyrone's undoing.

In May, the trial came before Chichester and the council. Tyrone lost his temper, snatching a document from O'Cahan's hands and tearing it up in front of Chichester. The council decreed that two-thirds of the lands should remain in O'Cahan's possession. Tyrone and O'Cahan were to travel to London in late September to have the dispute over the remaining third settled by the king.

== Exile in Rome, 1607–1616 ==
=== Flight of the Earls ===
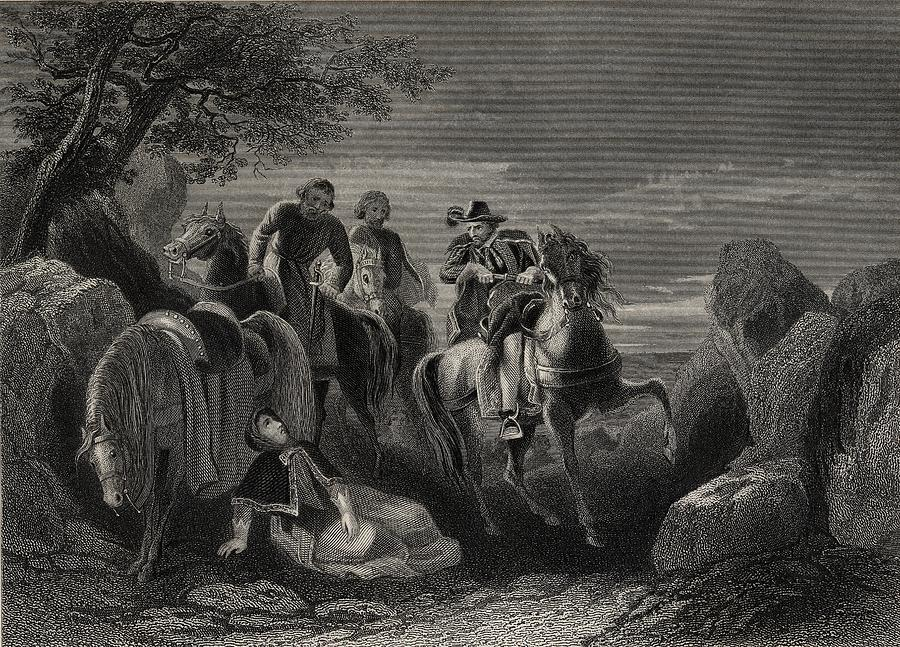
19th-century engraving of Tyrone coercing his wife Catherine to depart Ireland

In early summer 1607, Christopher St Lawrence, 10th Baron Howth, implicated Tyrconnell in a Catholic league of Irish lords which plotted to "shake off the yoke of the English government... and adhere to the Spaniard". Howth was assured from his exchanges with insiders that Tyrone was heavily involved in the league. Tyrone received intelligence, possibly from insiders on the English Privy Council, that the government intended to imprison him, or possibly execute him, once he got to London. Historians are undecided on whether the government actually intended to arrest Tyrone. A group of confederate allies, including clan chief Cuconnacht Maguire, seaman John Rath, Tyrconnell's secretary Matthew Tully and nobleman Donagh O'Brien, sent a French vessel to Ulster to facilitate an escape. Tyrconnell urged Tyrone to flee to Spain with him. Tyrone was at Slane with Chichester when news of the vessel's arrival reached him. He seemed to have come to an immediate snap decision. The exact cause of Tyrone's flight is a matter of controversy among historians, though Micheline Kerney Walsh and John McCavitt state Tyrone certainly believed that his arrest was imminent. Davies recollected that Tyrone left Slane in an unusually solemn manner, farewelling every servant and child in the house.

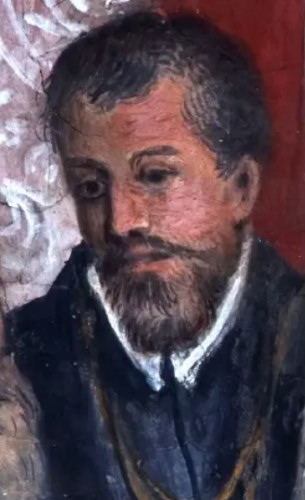
Tyrone fled to continental Europe with the 1st Earl of Tyrconnell, Hugh Roe O'Donnell's younger brother.

At midday on 4 September [N.S. 14 September] 1607, Tyrone and Tyrconnell embarked at Rathmullan on a ship bound for A Coruña. Accompanying them were their extended families and retinue, numbering about ninety-nine people. The Flight is seen to symbolically mark the collapse of Gaelic Irish society. Tyrone was clearly agitated during the departure. Due to time constraints, he left his five-year-old son Conn Ruadh behind, to Catherine's distress. According to an English account, "[Catherine] being exceedingly weary slipped down from her horse and weeping said she could go no further." Tyrone responded by threatening her with his sword "if she did not pass on with him and put on a more cheerful countenance".

The ship was driven by storms and contrary winds into port at Quillebeuf in Normandy. Henry IV of France refused English demands to hand over the émigrés and—though denying them from proceeding to Spain—permitted them passage to the Spanish Netherlands. Despite the earls' petitioning, Philip III would not allow the émigrés to enter Spain for fear of violating the 1604 Anglo-Spanish peace treaty. Spain was on the verge of bankruptcy and could not afford another war with England. In mid-December, the émigrés received news that Archduke Albert VII wanted them to leave his states. On 18 February [N.S. 28 February] 1608, Tyrone and his companions (now reduced to thirty-two people on horseback plus the women in a coach) left Leuven to travel southwards. The nobles left their younger children behind in Leuven under the care of Irish Franciscans at St Anthony's College. On 19 April [N.S. 29 April], Tyrone and Tyrconnell were welcomed into Rome by a large procession of cardinals. The two earls met Pope Paul V the next day. The journey to Rome was recorded in great detail by writer and passenger Tadhg Ó Cianáin. In November 1607 the flight was proclaimed as treasonous by James I. A bill of attainder was passed against Tyrone by the Parliament of Ireland on 28 October 1614.

=== Exile ===
The pope allowed the earls to reside at Palazzo Della Rovere on Borgo Vecchio, granting them a monthly pension of a hundred crowns. Philip III offered the collective sum of 700 ducats a month for the group of about 50 émigrés. The earls were displeased with the small size of their pension and their reduced lifestyles; they quickly found themselves in debt. Catherine became highly distressed by the Roman climate and her separation from her children, though Tyrone forbade her from relocating to Leuven. During his time in Rome, Tyrone attended papal ceremonies, visited catacombs and relics, ascended the Scala Santa on his knees, and made the traditional pilgrimage to the Seven Pilgrim Churches of Rome. In July 1608 Tyrconnell died of a fever, and by 1610, Tyrone's eldest sons Hugh and Henry had also died. Tyrone continued to petition Philip III for his assistance, including for help during O'Doherty's rebellion, but had no success.

Tyrone quickly became disillusioned with his exile and yearned to return to his position in Ireland. For the rest of his life, he did not give up the possibility of returning to Ireland. English spies were monitoring Tyrone during this period. In 1613 the English Crown briefly discussed with Tyrone a potential reconciliation, but this fell apart as the political situation changed. Tyrone ceased his petitioning to Philip III by 1614 when he was threatened with losing his pension unless he remained silent. By this time, Tyrone was planning an ambitious return to Ireland with Spanish aid. In March 1615, he declared to Philip III that "rather than live in Rome, he would prefer to go to his land with a hundred soldiers and die there in defence of the Catholic faith and of his fatherland". In July he bemoaned that he would likely "die within four or six years" and he did not wish to die "without the consolation of dying fighting for my religion and the territories of my forebears". English spies reported that, after a good dinner, Tyrone liked to talk about the prospect of "a good day in Ireland".

=== Death and burial ===
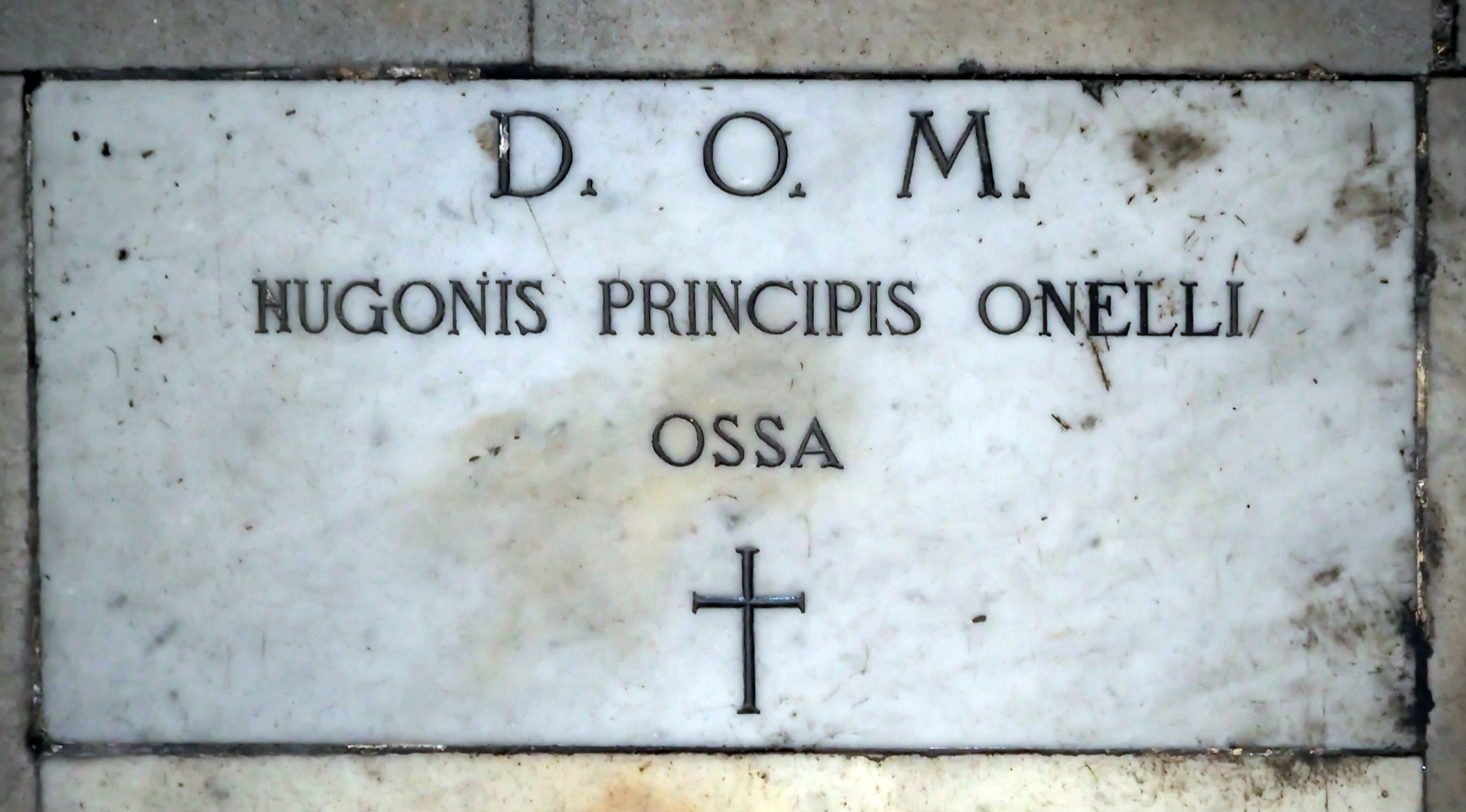
1989 replica of the 1616 inscription on the Earl's tomb—"Deo optimo maximo, Prince Hugh O'Neill, skeleton"

It has been alleged that Tyrone became blind in his last years, but this is probably propaganda spread by Chichester. Tyrone remained in good health throughout 1615 but he became seriously ill in January 1616. He died in Rome on 10 July [N.S. 20 July]. His elaborate funeral was paid for by the Spanish ambassador and attended by cardinals, foreign ambassadors, and many Irish dignitaries living in continental Europe. Attendees included Raymond Burke, Florence Conroy (Archbishop of Tuam), Donal O'Sullivan Beare (1st Count of Berehaven) and a FitzGerald of Desmond. Tyrone was interred in the church of San Pietro in Montorio, beside his son Hugh, his ally Tyrconnell, and Tyrconnell's brother Cathbarr O'Donnell. The Council of State remarked to Philip III that "as the Earl left no funds for his burial, Cardinal Borja spent what was necessary at the expense of the Embassy... but in doing this he endeavoured to cover such appearances as might cause difficulties in the relations of your Majesty with the King of England". This explains the brevity of the inscription on Tyrone's tomb. Allegedly, his bones were moved seven years after burial, and his hands were found to be perfectly intact. The original tombstone was lost in 1849 during the Risorgimento. In 1989 Tomás Ó Fiaich laid a new marble plaque with the same inscription.

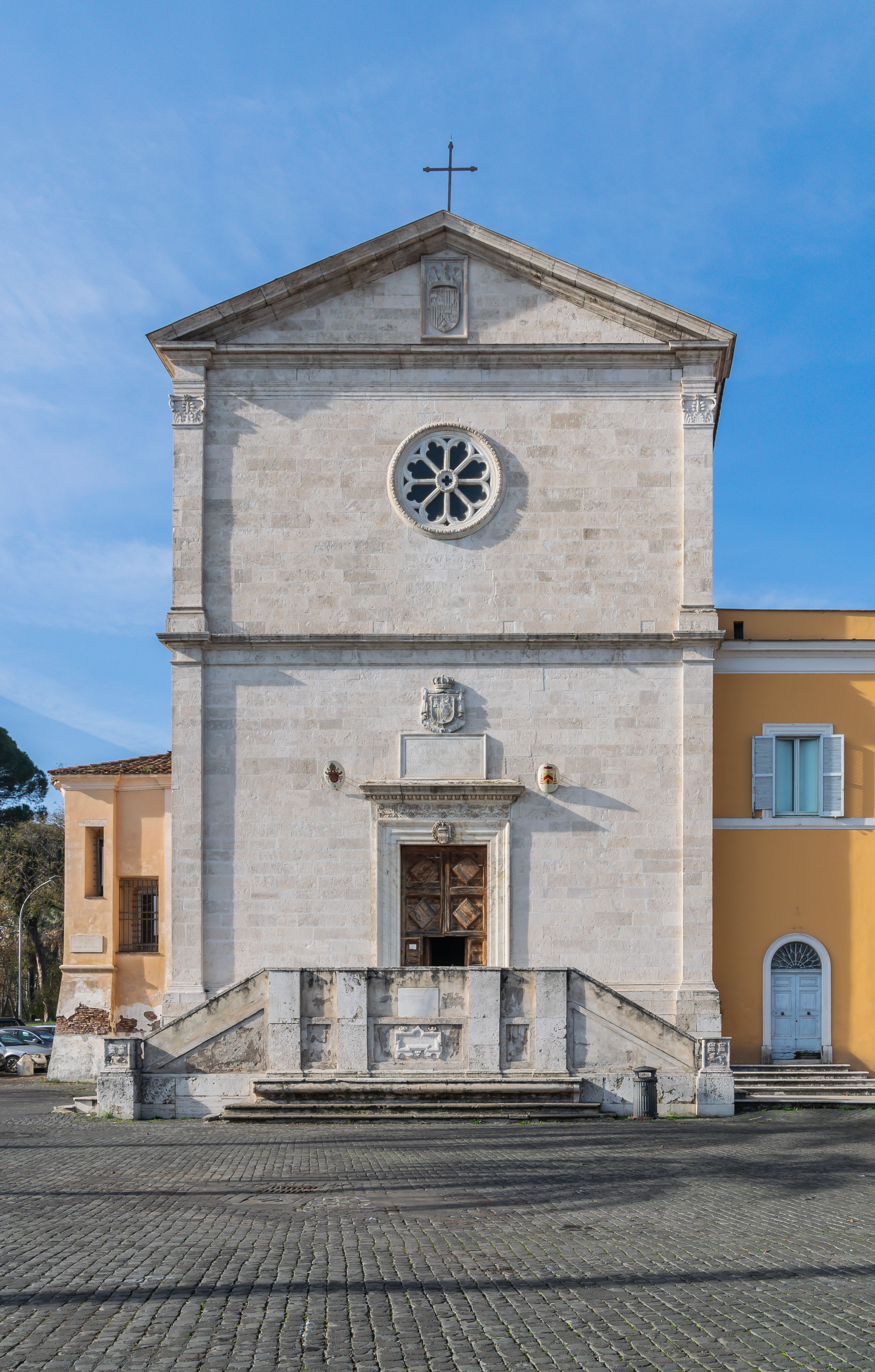
Tyrone's resting place, San Pietro in Montorio in Rome

Upon news of Tyrone's death, the court poets of Ireland engaged in the contention of the bards. His presence in Europe was a constant source of concern for the English, and his death came as a welcome relief. The Annals of the Four Masters, compiled in 1636, praise the Earl: "the person who here died was a powerful, mighty lord, [endowed] with wisdom, subtlety, and profundity of mind and intellect; a warlike, predatory, enterprising lord, in defending his religion and patrimony against his enemies". Conversely, because Tyrone had deserted his people in 1607, his own generation expressed little admiration for him.

== Legacy ==
Historian James MacGeoghegan rehabilitated Tyrone's image in the seventeenth century. This carried into the nineteenth century when Irish nationalists such as John Mitchel developed a romantic myth around Tyrone, portraying him as a selfless idealist dedicated to the freedom of Gaelic Ireland. Mitchel also credited Tyrone with the development of modern Irish nationalism and the concept of the first independent Irish state. Nevertheless, Tyrone tended to be sidelined in favour of his wartime ally Hugh Roe O'Donnell. Tyrone's "Machiavellian" nature and his partially-English cultural identity are reasons he was not embraced by Irish nationalists in the same way as O'Donnell, whose traditional Celtic upbringing, sensational prison break saga and tragic early death made him a Gaelic Irish martyr and national hero.

Seán Ó Faoláin's biography The Great O'Neill (1942) is the most influential modern work on Tyrone. It attracted a large readership but is today considered inaccurate and overdramatised. Particularly, Ó Faoláin incorrectly claims that Tyrone grew up in England (instead of the Pale) and he overtly romanticises Tyrone's marriage to Mabel Bagenal. Hiram Morgan's book Tyrone's Rebellion (1993), which focuses on Tyrone's life up to 1596, restored the Earl to the status he was formerly afforded by contemporary English commentators. Tyrone now overshadows O'Donnell in most modern depictions of the Nine Years' War. Morgan judges Tyrone more harshly than Ó Faoláin, and compared to other historians, he views Tyrone as loyal to the confederacy from the beginning. Generally speaking, present-day historians see Tyrone as a more compelling figure than O'Donnell. Tyrone's self-serving reasons for entering the war are also recognised.

== Financial and military power ==
The Earl of Tyrone was one of the richest lords in Ireland. Mountjoy estimated that Tyrone was generating revenue of £80,000 per year (Note: £80,000 in 1600 is equivalent to £21.3 million in November 2025.) (for comparison, the Tudor monarchy's total tax revenue in the 1540s was about £31,000). Tyrone's war efforts were primarily funded by cultivating crops and herds of cattle, and his army were mainly paid mercenaries.

In 1590, the Crown allowed Tyrone to obtain six tonnes of lead, ostensibly to weatherproof his hall in Dungannon, but he melted the lead into bullets for his army. Across late 1594 and early 1595, he bought £8,000 worth of gunpowder, lead and firearms from Scotland. He also established a facility in Dungannon to clandestinely manufacture gunpowder. Firearms were the primary weapon in Tyrone's army; he had an approximate 1:5 ratio of pikemen to riflemen, compared to the 1:2 ratio of his English adversaries.

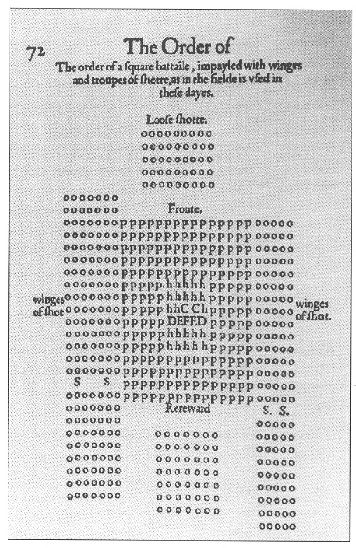
Late 16th-century English pamphlet depicting pike and shot, an infantry formation often used by Tyrone's forces

Tyrone introduced a "military revolution" to Ireland with his use of firepower and field fortifications. Although gunpowder weapons and continental tactics were already in use in Ireland before Tyrone's birth, he was in a unique position to combine the strengths of Irish, English and Spanish warfare. His army were trained with the latest European tactics of infantry warfare (such as pike and shot), adapted for the Irish landscape. Many of his soldiers were trained by veterans returned from the Spanish army. However, ammunition was often squandered following his forces' adoption of ammunition-intensive Spanish tactics. Tyrone's forces were very poor at siege warfare, as evident by their many failures to capture the occupied Blackwater fort. Tyrone had not been formally trained in regular warfare, hence why most of his successful battles were fought guerilla-style. Nevertheless with only small forces he was able to defeat the best English generals sent by Elizabeth I and exhaust her resources. Contemporary English sources lamented that Tyrone was "educated in our discipline and naturally valiant [and had become] worthily reputed the best man of war of his nation". Henry IV of France declared Tyrone to be the third greatest general of his time (after himself and the Count of Fuentes).

== Religious beliefs ==
Wartime propaganda depicted Tyrone as a "Catholic crusader", though his contemporaries had their doubts regarding the sincerity of his religious convictions. It is generally believed that his preoccupations were political rather than religious. In response to Tyrone framing the Nine Years' War as one of religious freedom, the 2nd Earl of Essex quipped "thou carest for religion as much as my horse".

Tyrone was born to Catholic parents, but raised amongst Protestants since the age of 8. The Hovenden family were the "least Protestant of the New English settlers". Tyrone's education in the Pale certainly would have anglicised him, but would not necessarily have led to an identity crisis. In fact, his background gave him the advantage of having allies from both English and Irish backgrounds. Tyrone feigned support for the Crown through the 1580s and early 1590s. On visits to Dublin, he attended Protestant services with the Lord Deputy. Tyrone's 1591 marriage ceremony was performed by a Protestant bishop because Tyrone wanted the marriage recognised under English law. Mabel later converted to Catholicism. Tyrone celebrated Easter 1584 per the Pope's new Gregorian calendar.

Once in open rebellion with the Crown, Tyrone publicly declared that his ultimate objective was to support the freedoms of Catholics by establishing the religion throughout Ireland. This proclamation was predominantly to widen support for his confederacy nationally and abroad, rather than as an authentic statement of belief. In fact, during 1596 peace negotiations the religious nature of his demands came as a surprise to the Dublin government, though he was willing to drop his demand for liberty of conscience. His wartime appeals to Spain typically highlighted the persecution Ireland suffered as a fellow Catholic nation.

Historians Nicholas Canny and Thomas O'Connor argue that Tyrone underwent a genuine religious conversion in the late 1590s. It was reported in August 1598 that O'Neill's men made confession before the battle. O'Connor believes that Tyrone's sentimental address at the 1599 parley of Dungannon is indicative of a "conversion experience" and goes beyond simple propaganda rhetoric. In his address, Tyrone candidly admitted his initially secular motives on entering the war and described Roman Catholicism as the one true religion. In the same year Tyrone went on pilgrimage to Holycross in Munster. In a 1600 memorandum to Pope Clement VIII, as part of the "Faith and Fatherland" campaign, Catholic Archbishop Peter Lombard refuted charges against Tyrone's past: "During his tutelage under the English, [he] never thought or professed anything other than what was orthodox in religion". According to Lombard, O'Neill attended daily mass, even in the field, and regularly confessed and received communion. Lombard admitted that Tyrone "was not yet always equally solicitous, earnest and zealous in the cause of religion", and claimed that it was the Earl's wartime experiences and the providential nature of his success on the field that molded him into a militant Catholic figure. Lombard did not meet Tyrone until the latter arrived in Rome, so most of his writings are based on reports from hundreds of miles away. During his exile, Tyrone interacted with the Pope and partook in traditional pilgrimages, but his religious views were apparently less dogmatic. This hints that Lombard may have exaggerated Tyrone's devoutness. Ultimately, Tyrone left no personal record of his faith.

== Personality ==
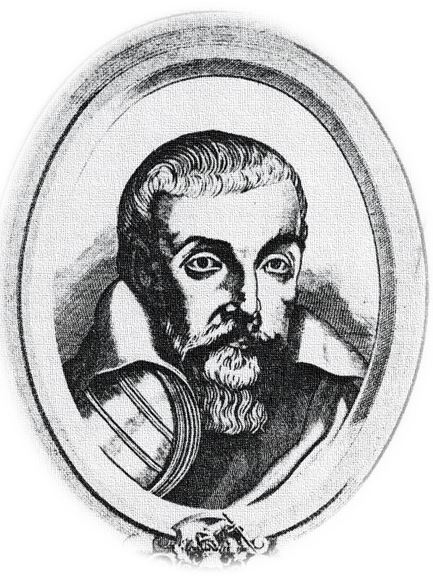
1680 illustration of Tyrone from Primo Demaschino's La Spada d'Orione

Although Tyrone lacked the magnetism and charisma of his son-in-law Hugh Roe O'Donnell, he was possessed of a considerable charm that produced confidence in others. Tyrone's charm extended even to Queen Elizabeth; letters patent reference him as "one Her Majesty would not willing deny any favour, knowing his devotion to her". This allowed him to build a wide range of contacts, including Old English, Gaelic Irish and New English figures, making him one of the most accomplished Irish politicians of his day. Historians have remarked on Tyrone's cultural fluency, which was highly unusual for Gaelic lords of the era. Tyrone's ability to speak English (unlike his Irish brethren) gave him a clear advantage in dealings with English politicians.

Tyrone's two-faced nature was well-known; as Attorney-General John Davies put it, "when the earl was in the presence of Englishmen, he was content to be called earl; but when among his followers, he would be highly indignant, nay, offended, if he was not styled 'O'Neill'". Lombard noted Tyrone's acting ability. Tyrone was also a skilled negotiator; he typically played the "good cop" to O'Donnell's "bad cop" during meetings with the government. O'Donnell was more aggressive and militaristic whereas Tyrone favoured negotiation with their enemies. He avoided impulsive decisions and was prepared to use English techniques to fight his enemies. According to historian Edward Alfred D'Alton, for these reasons, Tyrone bore little resemblance to the average boastful and talkative Gaelic lord. John McGurk described O'Neill as having the "rare gift of patience and the ability to inspire loyalty among erstwhile feuding chieftains".

However, Tyrone was also a ruthless politician not opposed to murdering his opponents for political gain. He was willing to put himself in danger during his many travels to Dublin. Tyrone was overly ambitious in his war aims, particularly since he had not been formally trained in warfare. His inability to win over the Old English and his over-reliance on Spanish intervention are the major factors that led to his defeat in the Nine Years' War. Conversely to D'Alton, Morgan notes that Tyrone's sudden flight from Ireland, leaving many of his people to suffer in the Plantation of Ulster, displays a selfishness that is typical of a Gaelic lord. Canny calls Tyrone a "forceful, determined and unscrupulous individual, who would allow nothing, and certainly not loyalty to Gaelic institutional life, to hinder his ambitions". Tyrone's disregard for Gaelic tradition and his Gaelic countrymen became evident following the war's end. Like his chieftain predecessors, Tyrone spent his life focused primarily on the pursuit and retention of power.

"He had a strong body, able to endure labour, watching and hunger: his industry was great, his soul large and fit for the weightiest business: much knowledge he had in military affairs, and a profound dissembling heart: in so much as some did prognosticate of him, that he was born either to the very great good or the great hurt of Ireland".

— Description of Tyrone by William Camden, Elizabeth I's official historian

== Wives and children ==
=== Daughter of Brian McPhelim O'Neill ===
In his late teens, he married a daughter of Brian McPhelim O'Neill of Clandeboye, probably named Katherine. Brian was in the queen's favour and initially appeared to be a useful ally against Turlough Luineach O'Neill. In 1574, after being incriminated in a violent conflict with English colonists, Brian and his immediate family were tried for treason and executed. Hugh withdrew any association with his father-in-law by annulling the marriage on grounds of consanguinity. Thus the children of this marriage were considered illegitimate by English society. Tyrone's first wife later married Niall MacBrian Faghartach O'Neill.

Their children include:

- A daughter, who married Ross McMahon around February 1579. She may have remarried to Philip O'Relieghe.
- Conn (died December 1601), known as Conn Mac An Iarla.

Children of Tyrone, presumably by his first wife, include:

- Rose; married Hugh Roe O'Donnell (1592–1597) and Donnell Ballagh O'Cahan (1598–1607).
- A daughter, who married her first cousin Henry McArt O'Neill, son of Art MacBaron O'Neill

=== Siobhán O'Donnell ===
Hugh married Siobhán O'Donnell (died January 1591) in June 1574, beginning his enduring alliance with the O'Donnells of Tyrconnell. In February 1579, Tyrone briefly repudiated his marriage to Siobhán—who had not yet born him a male heir—and prepared to marry one of Turlough's daughters in the hope of becoming Turlough's tanist. Hugh was convinced to end the engagement by a government commission. This episode apparently convinced Hugh that his "fate was tied to that of O'Donnell", though it is possible his reconciliation with Siobhán was a calculated move to keep in the government's favour.

They had two sons and multiple daughters:

- Margaret; married Richard Butler, 3rd Viscount Mountgarret in October 1595.
- Sarah (fl. 1595–1642); married Arthur Roe Magennis, 1st Viscount Iveagh in 1590.
- Mary (fl. 1608); married Brian McHugh Og MacMahon. She may have previously married Conn Oge O'Donnell.
- Alice (c. 1583/1588 – c. 1665); married Randal MacDonnell, 1st Earl of Antrim in 1604.
- Hugh, 4th Baron Dungannon (c. 1585 – September 1609)
- Henry (c. 1586 – 25 August 1610)

=== Mabel Bagenal ===
Tyrone was betrothed to Mabel Bagenal (c. 1571 – December 1595) in July 1591. They married on 3 August 1591 and had no offspring together.

Tyrone attempted to ease Mabel into her Gaelic lifestyle by decorating their residence with English furniture and tapestries. She was highly distressed by the growing rivalry between her brother and husband. In May 1593 the couple clashed over the assassination of Phelim MacTurlough O'Neill. Despite the romantic circumstances of their courtship, the marriage "probably ran its course" and Tyrone continued with his concubines. Tyrone stated "because I did affect two other gentlewomen, [Mabel] grew in dislike with me, forsook me, and went unto her brother to complain upon me to the council of Ireland, and did exhibit articles against me". By late 1595 she was living apart from Tyrone in Newry. She died in December, aged 24 years old.

=== Catherine Magennis ===
Tyrone married Catherine Magennis (died March 1619) around June 1597. He jilted the daughter of Angus MacDonald, 8th of Dunnyveg, to marry Catherine instead. It was a political marriage intended to bring the previously neutral Magennis family into the confederacy. With the pressure of the failing confederacy, Tyrone began drinking heavily and took his frustrations out on Catherine. He considered divorcing her in December 1605, but she allegedly warned him that she would expose his rebellious activities if he did so. Catherine reluctantly accompanied Tyrone on his flight. His will did not sufficiently provide for her and she died penniless in Naples.

She had three surviving sons:

- Shane (October 1599 – 29 January 1641); married the daughter of Madama de Buixln.
- Conn Ruadh (c. 1602 – in or after 1622)
- Brian (c. 1604 – 16 August 1617)

=== Other children ===
Tyrone was known to have various concubines. He had many illegitimate children or children of unknown/unclear maternal origin:

- Margaret O'Neill (fl. 1593–1612); married Hugh Maguire around May 1593
- Catherine O'Neill (fl. 1602); married Henry Oge O'Neill and had a son, Turlough McHenry O'Neill.
- A daughter, who married Donnell Oneyle
- Bridget (fl. 1615) (Note: The historian John McCavitt suggests that Bridget is the same individual as Tyrone's daughter Rose.)
- A daughter (fl. 1610); married Brian Art Roe McEny

== Depictions ==
=== Portraits ===
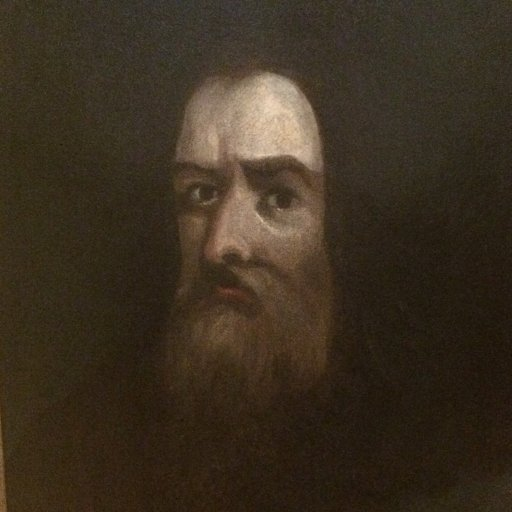
Fearon believed the above portrait was "made as [Tyrone] lived out his last years in Rome". In 2007, it was in the possession of Dom Hugo O'Neill, chief of the Clandeboy O'Neills.

According to historian James Kane, the only authenticated likeness of Hugh O'Neill is part of a fresco in the Vatican by Giovanni Battista Ricci. Painted circa 1610 in the Sala Paolina, the fresco depicts his attendance at the 1608 canonization of Frances of Rome by Pope Paul V. He stands next to the 1st Earl of Tyrconnell, sometimes mistaken for the Spanish ambassador. According to historian Benedict Fearon, Tyrone reputedly sat for a portrait during his last years in Rome.

An illustration of Tyrone appears in Primo Demaschino's La Spada d'Orione, published in Rome in 1680. Tyrone's likeness in this illustration was based on the Vatican fresco. In 1866, C. de Gernon owned two portraits of Tyrone—one in armour, the other in his old age—which both exhibited at the 1866 Exhibition of National Portraits. The old age portrait was presumably the La Spada d'Orione illustration.

By the 1990s, the armoured portrait was in the possession of Lord Dunsany. This reputed nineteenth-century portrait, from an original in the Vatican, was based on Tyrone's likeness from the La Spada d'Orione illustration. William Holl the Younger produced an engraving of Tyrone based on this portrait. This common image of Tyrone as a stocky armoured figure with cropped hair and a bushy black beard is "almost certainly a Victorian fantasy". Drawings from the 1620s depict Tyrone as a wiry man with a pointed beard and dark eyes.

The Ulster Museum owns two portraits of Tyrone—both were painted in the 19th century.

=== Literature ===
- In his 1861 poem Eirinn a' Gul ("Ireland Weeping"), Scottish Gaelic poet William Livingston laments the loss of Irish clan chiefs like Tyrone, O'Donnell and Maguire.
- Flint and Mirror, a 2022 novel by John Crowley, depicts Tyrone as a man whose loyalties are divided between the Queen of England and the old gods of Ireland.

=== Screen ===
- Portrayed by Alan Hale Sr. in the film The Private Lives of Elizabeth and Essex (1939), based on the play Elizabeth the Queen (1930).
- Portrayed by Tom Adams in the Disney film The Fighting Prince of Donegal (1966), with his name changed to Henry O'Neill.
- Portrayed by Patrick O'Connell in the BBC drama Elizabeth R (1971).
- Portrayed by Christopher Mellows in the RTÉ docudrama The Battle of Kinsale (2001).
- Portrayed by Stephen Rea in the docudrama film Imeacht na nIarlaí: Flight of the Earls (2007).
- In 2021, it was reported that writer Jack Armstrong was developing a television drama, titled The O'Neill, centered on Tyrone.

=== Theatre ===
- Tyrone is the central character in Brian Friel's play Making History (1989), which focuses on Tyrone reckoning with his legacy post-Flight. Stephen Rea played Tyrone in the original production by Field Day. Denis Conway played Tyrone in a touring 2007 production which marked the 400th anniversary of the Flight of the Earls.
- Running Beast, a 2007 musical theatre piece by Donal O'Kelly with music by Michael Holohan, is based on Tyrone's career. It commemorated the 400th anniversary of the Flight.

== Notes ==
Hugh O'Neill, Earl of Tyrone Ó Néill
Regnal titles
Preceded by Turlough Luineach O'Neill	Ó Néill; 1595–1616	Dormant
Peerage of Ireland
Preceded by Conn Bacagh O'Neill	Earl of Tyrone; 1587–1613	Forfeit (Successor Shane O'Neill recognised by Spain)
Preceded by Brian O'Neill	Baron Dungannon; 1562–1587	Succeeded by Hugh O'Neill
