= Wives and children of Hugh O'Neill, Earl of Tyrone =

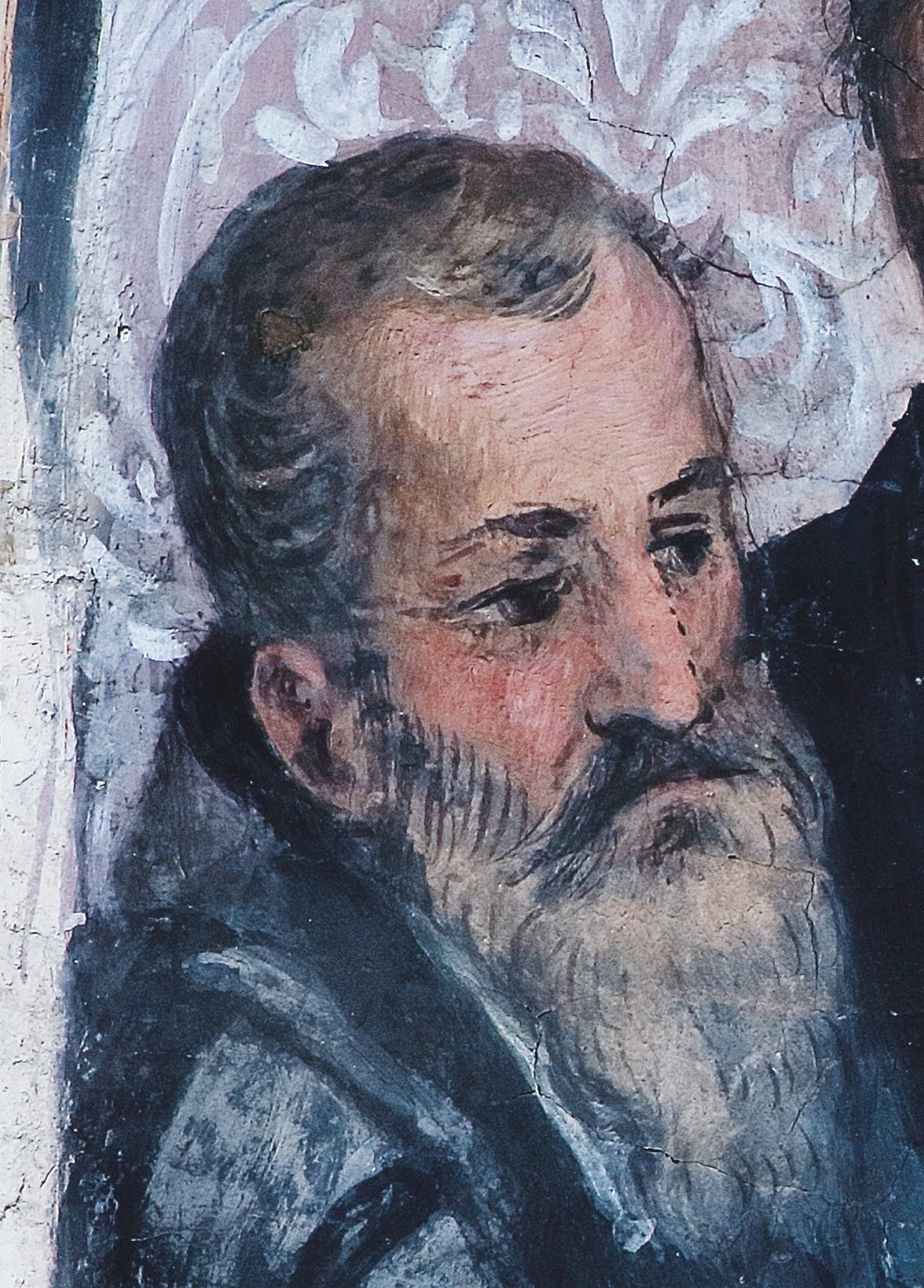
Portrait of Tyrone, c. 1610

Hugh O'Neill, Earl of Tyrone (c. 1550 – 1616) was an Irish lord and central figure of the Nine Years' War. He was married four times (Note: His first marriage was annulled, so Tyrone legally had three wives.) and also had many concubines. He had at least thirteen children by his wives and concubines.

As was standard practice for Gaelic lords, Tyrone used marriage—both his own and his children's—as a tool to form alliances and gain leverage within aristocratic communities. Each of his four marriages was political in nature. The dramatic circumstances of his third marriage to Mabel Bagenal intensified his political rivalry with Mabel's brother Henry Bagenal. From the outset of the Nine Years' War, two major confederate commanders were Tyrone's sons-in-law, Hugh Roe O'Donnell being married to Rose O'Neill and Hugh Maguire being married to her sister Margaret. Historian Mary O'Dowd described these relationships as "forming part of the labyrinthine network of family connections which the earl created in Ulster".

== Daughter of Brian McPhelim O'Neill ==
Around 1569 or 1570, Hugh O'Neill married a daughter of Brian McPhelim O'Neill of Clandeboye, probably named Katherine. (Note: Another source suggests the name Feodora.) Brian, chief of a junior branch of the O'Neill clan, was in the favour of English monarch Elizabeth I and initially appeared to be a useful ally against Hugh's rival, clan chief Turlough Luineach O'Neill. In 1574, after being incriminated in a violent conflict with English colonists, Brian and his immediate family were imprisoned, tried for treason and executed. Hugh withdrew any association with his father-in-law by annulling the marriage on grounds of consanguinity. Thus, the children of this marriage were considered illegitimate by English society. Hugh's first wife later married Niall MacBrian Faghartach O'Neill.

Their children include:

- A daughter who married Ross McMahon shortly before February 1579. Towards the end of 1579, her father intended to remarry her to Philip O'Relieghe. After the execution of her father-in-law Hugh Roe MacMahon in 1590, the Earl of Tyrone was denied the dowry he was owed from the marriage.
- Conn (died December 1601), known as Conn Mac An Iarla ("son of the Earl"), who served as an important captain to Tyrone throughout the war. Conn was wounded near Kilmallock in 1600 and died in December the following year. His son Feardorcha took part in the Flight of the Earls.

Children of Tyrone, presumably by his first wife, include:

- Rose (Note: Morgan presumes that Rose's mother was Tyrone's first wife. Casway and Morwenna Donnelly confirm that this is possible. McGettigan believes Rose's mother was Brian McPhelim's daughter, whom he describes as a concubine of Tyrone. In 1606, Rose was described by loyalist Niall Garve O'Donnell as illegitimate, though all of the children of Tyrone's annulled first marriage were considered illegitimate by English society.) (fl. 1587 – 1607), who was betrothed to Hugh Roe O'Donnell by 1587. They married in December 1592 and separated in 1595. Despite reconciling in April 1597, by the following year they had divorced, putting Tyrone's partnership with O'Donnell under strain. In 1599 she remarried to Tyrone's principal vassal Donnell Ballagh O'Cahan to strengthen clan ties, but O'Cahan left her in March 1607.
- A daughter (Note: Walsh writes that this "daughter of the Earl of Tyrone here in question may, perhaps, have been a child of the daughter of [Brian McPhelim O'Neill] who was divorced from Tyrone, as has been already shown.") who married her first cousin Henry McArt O'Neill, son of Art MacBaron O'Neill

== Siobhán O'Donnell ==
Hugh married Siobhán O'Donnell (died January 1591) in June 1574, beginning his enduring alliance with the O'Donnell clan of Tyrconnell. The O'Donnell and O'Neill clans had traditionally been mortal enemies for centuries. The 1st Earl of Essex announced the marriage on 14 June, though it may only have been a betrothal at that stage.

In February 1579, Hugh briefly repudiated his marriage to Siobhán—who had not yet borne him a male heir—and prepared to marry one of Turlough O'Neill's daughters in the hope of becoming Turlough's tanist (designated heir). It has been incorrectly stated by historian Paul Walsh and in the Calendar of State Papers, Ireland that Hugh's brief separation from Siobhán was a formal divorce. Hugh was convinced by a government commission to end the engagement and wait out for the aging Turlough's natural death. This episode apparently convinced Hugh that his "fate was tied to that of O'Donnell". However it is possible that his reconciliation with Siobhán was a calculated move to keep in the government's favour.

Hugh and Siobhán had two sons and multiple daughters:

- Margaret (fl. 1598) who married Richard Butler, 3rd Viscount Mountgarret shortly before 8 October 1596—possibly in October 1595.
- Sarah (fl. 1595–1602), who married Arthur Roe Magennis, 1st Viscount Iveagh in 1590. Through Sarah, the Earl of Tyrone is an ancestor to the Anglo-Irish Wellesley family.
- Mary (fl. 1608), who married Brian McHugh Og MacMahon. According to historian George Hill, Mary is the same woman who married Ross McMahon. She may have earlier married Conn Oge O'Donnell, who died in 1601.
- Alice (c. 1583/1588 – c. 1665) who married Randal MacDonnell, 1st Earl of Antrim in 1604. She was younger than her sisters Sarah and Mary, and older than her brother Hugh.
- Hugh, 4th Baron Dungannon (c. 1585 – September 1609); he died in Rome and was buried in San Pietro in Montorio on 24 September.
- Henry (c. 1586 – 25 August 1610); he became colonel of the first Irish tercio in the Spanish army.

== Mabel Bagenal ==
Shortly after Siobhán's death, the Earl of Tyrone began to woo Mabel Bagenal (c. 1571 – December 1595), the twenty-year-old sister of Marshal Henry Bagenal. Marrying into the Bagenal family would allow Tyrone to neutralise Henry's growing political power. Henry was alarmed and kept Mabel out of Tyrone's reach by sending her to live with their sister Mary Barnewall in Turvey. According to Tyrone's letter to the Privy Council: "I dealt with [Henry] at least six several times for his consent; I offered to put in sureties for the assurance of a jointure to his sister; this I did before good witnesses". Tyrone found excuses to visit Mabel at Turvey, and in July he convinced her to elope.

After a dinner at Turvey, Tyrone and his English friends distracted Mabel's brother-in-law, Patrick Barnewall. Meanwhile, Tyrone's ally William Warren escorted Mabel on horseback to Warren's house in Drumcondra, and she was married to Tyrone at Drumcondra Castle on 3 August 1591. The celebrant, Protestant Bishop of Meath Thomas Jones, was initially reluctant to perform the marriage but was convinced of Mabel's free consent after a private conversation with her.

Tyrone encouraged Mabel to decorate their residence with English furniture and tapestries. She also converted to Catholicism, the religion of Tyrone's parents. However, the marriage exacerbated Tyrone and Henry's rivalry. At Dundalk in 1593, Tyrone openly insulted Mabel's brother whilst in her presence. The couple reached a major crisis in May 1593 when they clashed over the assassination of Phelim MacTurlough O'Neill, a client of Henry Bagenal. Casway believes that despite the romantic circumstances of their courtship, the marriage "probably ran its course" and Tyrone would have continued to maintain concubines. According to Tyrone himself, "because I did affect two other gentlewomen, she grew in dislike with me, forsook me, and went unto her brother to complain upon me to the council of Ireland, and did exhibit articles against me". Mabel died in December 1595, aged 24 years old. The couple had no offspring together.

== Catherine Magennis ==
Tyrone married Catherine Magennis (died March 1619) around June 1597, thus jilting the daughter of Angus MacDonald, 8th of Dunnyveg. This was a political marriage intended to bring the previously neutral Magennis family into the confederacy. Catherine's brother, Arthur Roe, had previously married Tyrone's daughter Sarah.

The Crown respected the Magennis family, and Catherine was "accustomed to a comfortable way of life". With the pressure of the failing confederacy, Tyrone began drinking heavily and took his frustrations out on Catherine. He considered divorcing her in December 1605, but allegedly she confronted him and warned that if he did not stop his abuse, she "would discover him so far as to infer again to rebellion or to lose his head". English administrator Arthur Chichester subsequently sent officer Toby Caulfield to recruit Catherine as a double agent, but she dismissed this out of hand. Catherine reluctantly accompanied Tyrone on the Flight of Earls, and was highly distressed by her diminished lifestyle and her separation from her children (who were left in Leuven). Tyrone died in Rome on 20 July 1616. His will did not sufficiently provide for Catherine, and she died penniless in Naples.

Catherine had three surviving sons by Tyrone:

- Shane (October 1599 – 29 January 1641) who was recognised by the Spanish court as the successive Earl of Tyrone. Per his father's request, he succeeded Henry as colonel of the Irish tercio. Shane fought in the Reapers' War and was killed in Catalonia at the Battle of Montjuïc.
- Conn Ruadh (c. 1602 – in or after 1622), also known as Conn na Creige ("Conn of the rock"). He was left behind at the time of the Flight, was sent to Eton College to be re-educated as a Protestant, and was committed to the Tower of London on 12 August 1622.
- Brian (c. 1604 – 16 August 1617), who was found hanged in his room in Brussels with his hands tied behind his back, possibly assassinated.

== Other children ==
Tyrone was known to have various concubines. He had many illegitimate children or children of unknown maternal origin:

- Margaret O'Neill (fl. 1593–1612), who married Hugh Maguire around May 1593
- Catherine O'Neill (fl. 1602), who married Henry Oge O'Neill and had a son, Turlough McHenry O'Neill. Her husband and son both died in 1608 fighting against O'Doherty's rebellion.
- A daughter, who married Donnell Oneyle
- A daughter (fl. 1615), possibly named Bridget, who was with Tyrone in Rome before his death. She presumably took part in the Flight. The historian John McCavitt suggests that she is the same individual as Rose.
- A daughter (fl. 1610) who married Brian Art Roe McEny
