= Shane O'Neill, 3rd Earl of Tyrone =

Irish-born nobleman and soldier (1599–1641)

Shane O'Neill

3rd Earl of Tyrone
- Tenure: 1626 (Note: Charles Patrick Meehan stated that the title was conferred on Shane in 1626. Micheline Kerney Walsh stated that Shane inherited the title on his father's death in 1616.)–1641
- Predecessor: Hugh O'Neill, Earl of Tyrone
- Successor: Hugo Eugenio O'Neill, 4th Earl of Tyrone
- Born: 28 October 1599; Dungannon, Tír Eoghain, Ireland
- Died: 29 January 1641 (aged 41); Near Castelldefels, Catalonia, Crown of Aragon
- Buried: Madrid, Crown of Castile
- Noble family: O'Neill dynasty
- Spouse: Ms de Buixln
- Issue: Hugo Eugenio O'Neill; Catalina O'Neill
- Father: Hugh O'Neill, Earl of Tyrone
- Mother: Catherine Magennis

Colonel Shane O'Neill, 3rd Earl of Tyrone (Irish: Seán Ó Néill; Spanish: Juan O'Neill; also anglicised John O'Neill; 28 October 1599 – 29 January 1641) was an Irish-born nobleman, soldier and member of the Spanish nobility who primarily lived and served in continental Europe. He fought for Spain in the Franco-Spanish War (1635–1659) and the Reapers' War.

O'Neill was born during the Nine Years' War in Ireland, the son of Irish confederate leader Hugh O'Neill. Shane O'Neill and his extended family permanently left Ireland in 1607 due to hostility from the English-led government. O'Neill grew up in the Spanish Netherlands. By 1610 he had become his father's eldest surviving son, and he eventually moved to Spain to serve in the Spanish army. Though James I of England had attainted his father's title (Earl of Tyrone) in 1614, the Spanish court made O'Neill the third holder of the equivalent Spanish title El Conde de Tyrone. O'Neill was also de jure 6th Baron Dungannon from 1610 to 1614 by patent of the original earldom.

O'Neill succeeded his elder half-brother Henry as colonel of the original Irish regiment (tercio) in the Netherlands. He was a major supporter of a proposed 1627 Spanish invasion of Ireland. O'Neill professionally clashed with fellow Irish noble-turned-soldier Hugh Albert O'Donnell, Earl of Tyrconnell, even though their fathers had been wartime allies. Following military success at the Siege of Fuenterrabía, O'Neill was appointed a member of the Council of War in 1640. His duties to the Spanish military impeded his lifelong desire to return to Ireland and stage a revolution against English rule. O'Neill died in Catalonia at the Battle of Montjuïc in 1641, and was succeeded by his son Hugo Eugenio O'Neill as both Earl and colonel of the regiment.

== Early life ==
=== Nine Years' War ===
Shane O'Neill was born in Dungannon on 28 October [O.S. 18 October] 1599, during Ireland's Nine Years' War. His father was Irish lord Hugh O'Neill, Earl of Tyrone, chief of the O'Neill clan, Tír Eoghain's ruling Gaelic Irish noble family. His mother was Hugh's fourth wife Catherine Magennis, daughter of Sir Hugh Magennis, Baron of Iveagh. The Magennis family were based in Rathfriland. O'Neill had two younger full-brothers, Conn Ruadh (born c. 1602) and Brian (born c. 1604). He also had various elder half-siblings on his father's side, including Conn Mac An Iarla, Rose, Alice, Hugh and Henry.

From the 1590s to 1603, Hugh O'Neill led a confederacy of Irish clans against the Tudor conquest of Ireland. As Shane's godfather he chose Donough O'Connor Sligo, a loyalist who submitted to the confederacy through the intimidation of confederacy commander Hugh Roe O'Donnell; Hugh hoped to further enmesh O'Connor into the confederacy. Shane was born during a period when the confederacy had won many victories over the English Crown. Catherine was present at Hugh's camp when she was four months pregnant with Shane.

=== Flight of the Earls ===
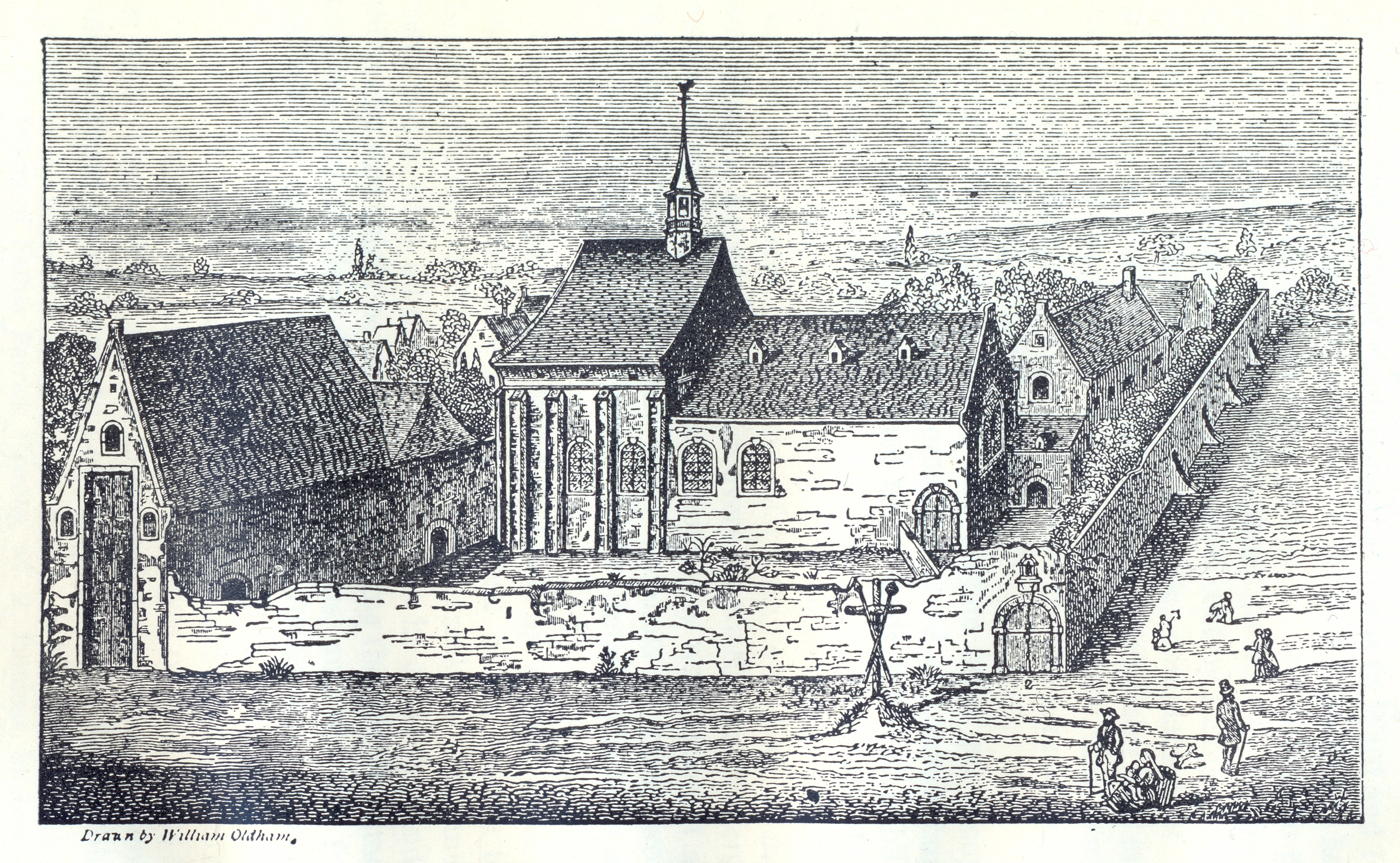
Shane O'Neill was raised at St Anthony's College, Leuven.

English officials, notably Lord Deputy Arthur Chichester, regularly antagonised Hugh O'Neill following his surrender in 1603. Chichester diminished the power of Irish lords by abolishing the Gaelic feudal system. He unsuccessfully attempted to recruit Catherine as a double agent, and began to work with John Davies, the Attorney-General for Ireland, to find evidence against Hugh. In early summer 1607, Christopher St Lawrence, 10th Baron Howth, implicated Hugh in a Catholic league of Irish lords which plotted to "shake off the yoke of the English government... and adhere to the Spaniard".

With Hugh possibly facing arrest for his alleged involvement in a treasonous plot, in September 1607 he decided to abruptly leave Ireland for continental Europe along with ninety of his followers. At the time his ally, the Anglo-Irish politician Garret Moore, was housing Shane, who received his education alongside Moore's family. On the afternoon of 9 September, Hugh left Moore's house with his son as they prepared to depart Ireland. On 14 September, at the age of eight, Shane left Ireland with his parents during the Flight of the Earls. His brother Conn was left behind in the rush. Hugh O'Neill was accompanied by his wartime ally Rory O'Donnell, patriarch of the comparatively powerful O'Donnell clan of Tyrconnell. The refugees hoped to reach Spain but King Philip III turned them away due to fears of violating the Anglo-Spanish peace treaty. Thus the refugees spent the winter in the Spanish Netherlands.

In mid-December, the refugees received news that Archduke Albert VII, sovereign of the Spanish Netherlands, wanted them to leave his states. O'Neill, along with many of the nobles' children, was left in the Spanish Netherlands whilst his parents proceeded to Rome. He was educated by Franciscans at St Anthony's College, Leuven, in the company of his brother Brian and fellow nobles Hugh Albert O'Donnell (son of Rory O'Donnell) and Hugh O'Donnell (son of Cathbarr O'Donnell).

=== Dealings with Philip III ===
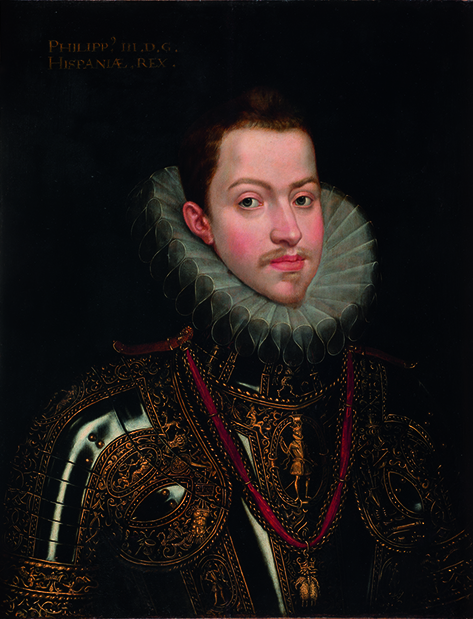
Philip III of Spain denied the many requests from O'Neill's father to associate himself with Shane.

Two of O'Neill's half-brothers died from illnesses in quick succession—Hugh in Rome in 1609; Henry in Aranda in 1610. Their father aimed to strengthen Philip III's favour toward Shane, now his eldest surviving son. However, Philip III sought to avoid appearing to side with Irish rebels, which could instigate warfare with England. (Note: In 1612, prior to the confirmation of one of Tyrone's sons, Hugh requested that Philip III be the child's sponsor. The request was discussed by the Spanish Council of State. The Council of State recommended that instead, the Spanish ambassador to Albert VII should act as the child's sponsor in his own name. In 1957, the historian Micheline Kerney Walsh identified Shane as this child. However, in 1996 she clarified that it was Shane's brother Brian.) In 1613, Shane went to the court at Brussels as a page to the Infanta Isabella Clara Eugenia, Albert VII's wife and joint sovereign. Hugh O'Neill continued to compel the Spanish government to grant his son special privileges which could be of use to his exiled countrymen. In September 1614, Hugh sent another petition to Philip III asking him to make Shane a Knight of the Military Order of Santiago, an order of knights founded to fight Spanish Muslims and protect Catholic pilgrims. In November, the Infanta wrote in support of Shane. Philip III refused this, stating that other individuals of merit must be attended to first, but that he would consider anything that could be done for Shane.

Henry O'Neill had been the colonel of the first Irish regiment in the Spanish army, known as the "Old Irish Regiment" (Spanish: El Tercio Viejo Irelandés) or "Regiment of Tyrone". His death left a vacant colonelcy. The English had previously conspired against the formation of the Irish regiment and had planted spies there. Archbishop Florence Conroy feared that the English would try to fill the vacancy with a colonel sympathetic to the English government. Two weeks after Henry's death, Conroy wrote to Philip III, urging him to immediately appoint Henry's cousin Owen Roe O'Neill to the colonelcy. Hugh instead requested that Shane be appointed. Philip III granted this request, and recommended that Owen Roe should instead be made major of the regiment. Though Owen Roe had failed in his bid to take command, within a few years of Henry's death he was promoted to sergeant-major of the regiment. As Shane was still pursuing his studies, Owen Roe served as acting commander until Shane was old enough to assume leadership. During his tenure, Owen Roe played a key role in making the regiment into a valuable asset to the Spanish military.

In 1615, Hugh's chaplain Fr. Chamberlain arrived in Brussels to arrange a marriage between Shane and the daughter of Don Juan de Mancicidor (Secretary for War in the Archduke's government). The English representative in Flanders, William Trumbull, warned his government that the marriage would increase the standing of the exiled Irish community. In Trumbull's opinion, "it is high time some underhand means were used to prevent the match". Trumbull was apparently successful; he reported that arguments against the marriage had been put forward, and the marriage did not take place.

=== Succession as Earl of Tyrone ===
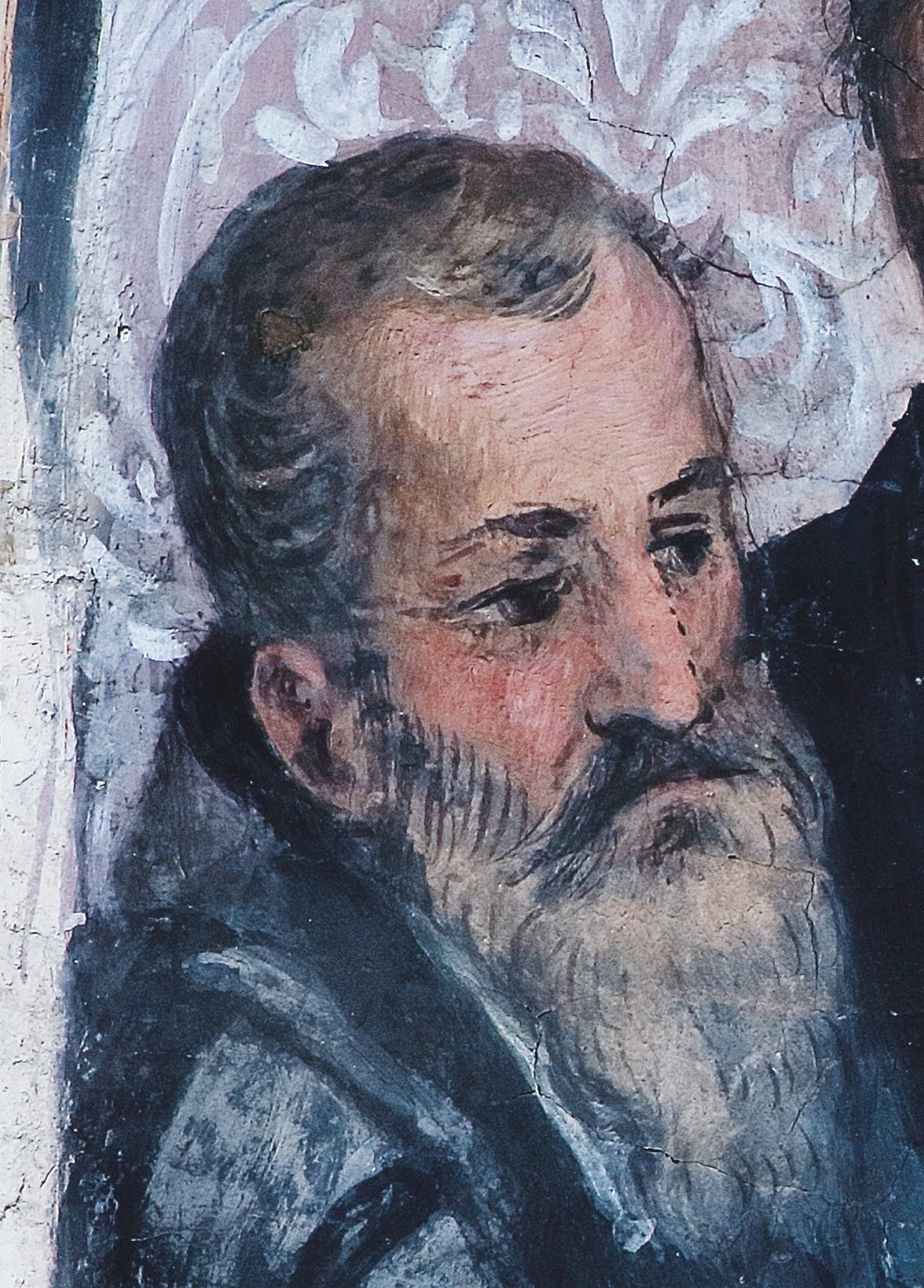
O'Neill's father, Hugh O'Neill, Earl of Tyrone

Hugh O'Neill died in Rome in July 1616. Though English authorities no longer recognised the title Earl of Tyrone since it had been attainted in 1614, the Spanish court granted Shane the equivalent Spanish title El Conde de Tyrone. (Note: Conde is usually translated into English as "Count"; Micheline Walsh uses "Earl".) (Note: According to Charles Patrick Meehan, the Spanish title of El Conde de Tyrone was conferred on O'Neill in 1626.) Officially Shane was the third of this title. (Note: Shane's uncle Brian was de jure Earl of Tyrone, but Brian was never formally granted the title before his death. If Brian is included, Shane would be the 4th Earl. Indeed, both Burke's Peerage and the historian Hugo O'Donnell refer to Shane as the 4th Earl of Tyrone.) Additionally, he was de jure 6th Baron Dungannon from 1610 to 1614 by patent of the earldom of Tyrone, though not recognised as such by the Irish House of Lords. (Note: Shane's older half-brother Hugh was 4th Baron Dungannon. After Hugh's death in 1609, the title passed to Tyrone's next eldest son Henry. After Henry's death in 1610, the title passed to Shane until its attainder in 1614.)

O'Neill became estranged from his mother Catherine due to arguments over his father's will. They disputed over their shares of the late earl's pension as well as the maintenance of his dependents. Hugh's unhappy retainers asked his secretary to inform Shane that his mother was refusing to give them the money bequeathed to them. They asked for Shane's support and even suggested that Shane force his mother to become a nun. They cautioned Shane to send someone to Rome to deposit his father's money and valuables in a bank before his mother could.

In August 1617, O'Neill's 13-year-old brother Brian was found hanged in his room in Brussels with his hands tied behind his back, possibly killed by an English assassin or accidentally killed during a children's game. Despite their arguments over his father's will, O'Neill was said to be greatly saddened at his mother's death in March 1619. On 9 June 1623, the Infanta Isabella wrote to Philip IV of Spain, requesting that he ask James I of England to have O'Neill restored to his estates.

== Career ==
=== Old Irish Regiment ===
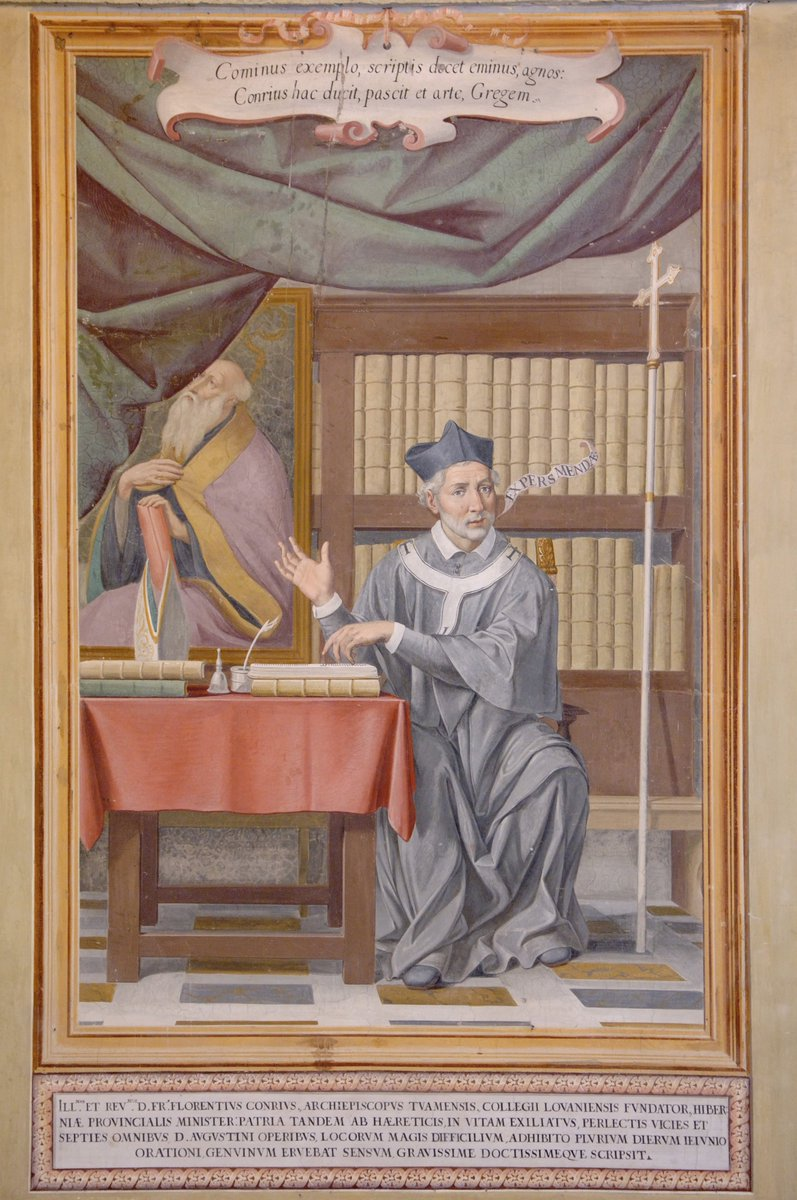
Catholic Archbishop Florence Conroy was an important adherent to O'Neill's family during their exile.

O'Neill began his military career in 1615 and assumed command of the "Regiment of Tyrone". (Note: According to Charles Patrick Meehan, O'Neill eventually succeeded to the rank of major-general.) Like his cousins and other Irish refugees, he had ambitions to return to Ireland with the regiment to take back his lands and restore his family's rank. O'Neill used his influence with Pope Urban VIII to have his former tutor Hugh MacCaghwell installed as Archbishop of Armagh and Primate of All Ireland in early 1626. MacCaghwell died in September that year, and O'Neill organised the erection of a monument in the Sant'Isidoro a Capo le Case, a Catholic church in Rome.

=== Proposed Spanish invasion of Ireland ===
Conflict between Spain and England was revived with the Anglo-Spanish War of 1625 to 1630. From 1625, Irishmen living on the Continent pressured the Spanish government to use this conflict to liberate Ireland from English control. By this time, Hugh Albert O'Donnell had succeeded his father as Earl of Tyrconnell (Note: Though the title had officially been attainted by the Irish Parliament in 1614, Hugh Albert continued to call himself Earl of Tyrconnell.) and had begun a military career. As O'Neill and O'Donnell had claims as the heirs of the two most powerful Ulster clans, (Note: Shane and Hugh Albert were the eldest surviving sons of their fathers, who themselves were the heads of the two most powerful Ulster clans.) Florence Conroy proposed they take command of an Irish invasion force. Conroy stated that since "one will never serve under the other", both men should be made generals of equal footing. Conroy also proposed that half of O'Neill's regiment could be assigned to O'Donnell, with Walloon soldiers drafted to supplement the invasion force. A fleet of 11 ships had been prepared at Dunkirk by March 1627, with the fleet anticipated to sail in September. Disagreements remained however, as the Spanish government was reticent to be publicly associated with the invasion. The two earls also could not abide each other and argued over their roles as joint commanders. The authorities in Brussels wished for O'Neill to be in sole command, while Madrid favoured O'Donnell (probably because Conroy remained there as an advisor).

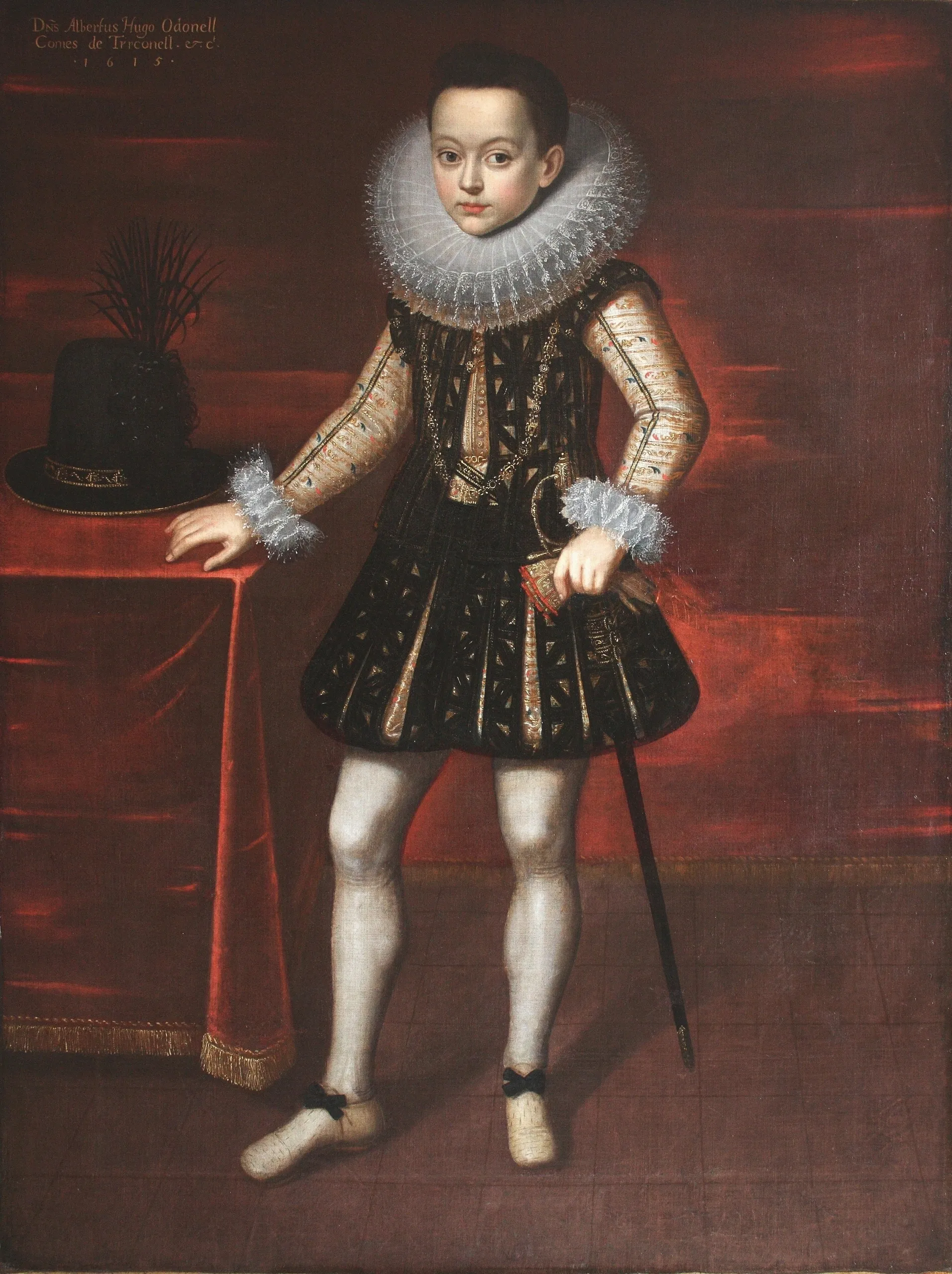
O'Neill quarreled with Hugh Albert O'Donnell, Earl of Tyrconnell, who served as colonel of the second Irish regiment in the Netherlands.

With the approval of Philip IV, it was proposed (possibly by Owen Roe) that an Irish republic should be established rather than a new monarchy. This was to avoid conflict between the earls over who had the right to the throne of Ireland. The Infanta suggested that "the earls should be called Captains General of the said republic and... one could exercise his office on land and the other at sea". Correspondence within the Irish government demonstrates that O'Neill was considered a threat to English rule. A letter from the Lord Deputy of Ireland, Viscount Falkland, dated 27 April 1627, claimed that O'Neill would have Philip IV crown him King of Ulster and appoint him governor of Ireland on Spain's behalf, and that O'Neill would have the power to create new noble titles, attract important allies and gain the cooperation of Irish Catholics. Falkland also claimed that a story was circulating among the Irish that O'Neill had already received a crown of gold, which he kept on his bedside table in Brussels.

Conroy proposed an arranged marriage between O'Neill and Mary Stuart O'Donnell, Hugh Albert's sister, to remove tensions and unify the noble families. Mary was born in England shortly after the Flight, as her pregnant mother Bridget had been left behind due to time constraints. Mary was strong-willed and a staunch Catholic who disliked her mother's Protestant family; in 1626 she fled from England following her involvement in a prison break. She arrived in Brussels in January 1627. Conroy wrote in March 1627, "Let the king of Spain... get the Infanta to treat of bringing about a marriage between the sister of the earl of Tyrconnell, who has lately fled from England and the earl of Tyrone, and let his Majesty give her a dowry, since her brother cannot do so". O'Neill was then 28; Mary was about 19. However, Mary was secretly in a relationship with an Irishman named Dudley O'Gallagher, who had accompanied her to the Continent; she rejected the marriage.

Despite an English expedition on Cádiz in 1625, the Anglo-Spanish conflict did not develop into full-scale war. Philip IV was never optimistic about the invasion's chances and was unwilling to support an independent Ireland whilst Spain was officially at peace with England. Plans for the invasion were abandoned. Conroy died in Madrid in 1629. Mary became pregnant around this time and her relationship with O'Gallagher was exposed. The couple fled to Italy in disgrace.

=== Madrid ===
O'Neill left Brussels for Madrid. Shortly after his arrival in 1630, he submitted two documents to the government: detailed plans for an invasion of Ireland, and a request that the restoration of his family's Irish estates should be included in Anglo-Spanish peace negotiations. Government commissioners felt that circumstances were not yet suitable to grant O'Neill's requests and advised Philip IV to wait for a more favourable occasion, but recommended that the king should increase O'Neill's pay by two hundred crowns per month. The commissioners were concerned that this pay raise could create a dangerous precedent and make the Irish refugees reliant on the king. It was suggested that, to ensure the stability of the O'Neill family, a marriage should be arranged between O'Neill and some wealthy or noble lady. O'Neill stayed in Madrid for the next three years. He felt slighted and protested when the king gave Hugh Albert O'Donnell his own Irish regiment in January 1632. In May 1632, O'Neill was appointed Knight Commander of the military Order of Calatrava.

"The financial help which I am accustomed to give to the College of Alcalá shall be continued for one or two years only and I beg His Majesty, who may God keep, to contribute to its upkeep and to further this pious work which is of service to God and to my poor fatherland. I charge my heir to do Iikewise in as much as possible and to plead this case with His Majesty and his ministers."

— Shane O'Neill, in his will dated 18 September 1640

O'Neill founded the Irish College of St Patrick at Alcalá de Henares in 1630. His confessor, Richard Goold, a native of Limerick, was professor of theology at the college in 1624. The college closed after O'Neill's death due to a lack of financial liquidity.

=== Franco-Spanish War ===
In January 1635, the French military made efforts to lure O'Neill and O'Donnell to work for their own military. O'Neill sailed from Flanders in early 1638. By June 1638, he was in A Coruña, where he was joined by O'Donnell and his regiment. The earls' regiments were the first to be transferred from Flanders. In July, the earls received permission to visit the Spanish court and so they went to Madrid. Before O'Neill arrived at Madrid, he sent Philip IV a petition for "a house suitable for his position, a carriage and maintenance, as he had received the first time he came to the court with the Duque de Ariscot". The Spanish Council of State recommended that this be given as O'Neill's stay would be short. However, the king recognised the need to not appear to choose favourites between O'Neill and O'Donnell's houses. He wrote: "Examine what can be done with the Count of Tyrconnell considering that both of them are coming to serve in my household; from what my brother has written to me I do not know how the matter may be adjusted evenly."

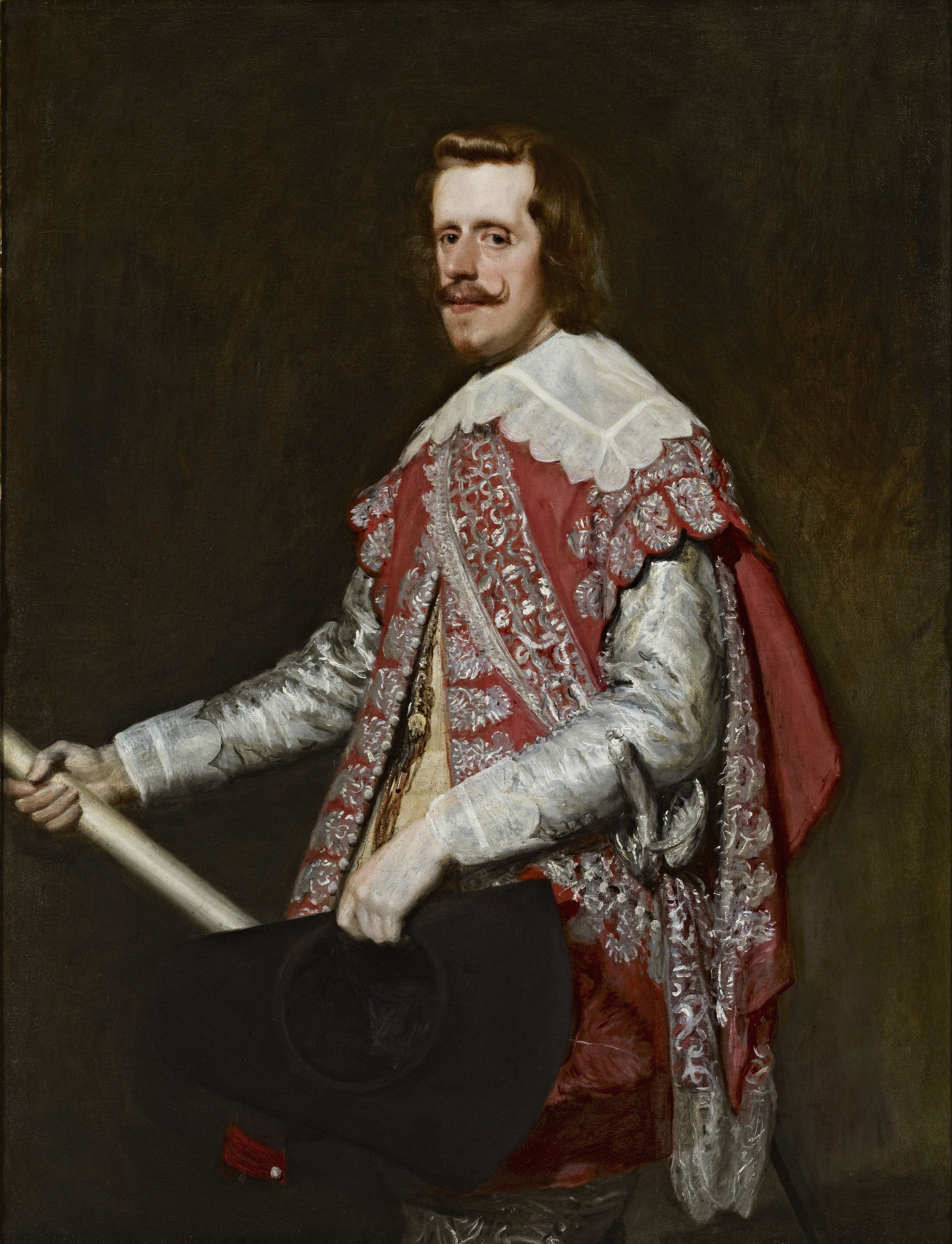
O'Neill repeatedly petitioned Philip IV of Spain for assistance in a proposed Spanish invasion of Ireland.

O'Neill reached Madrid on 25 July 1638, and wrote to the king: "The weather and the journey have prevented the Count of Tyrconnell and myself from arriving, as we had wished, before to-night. We humbly beg Your Catholic Majesty to compensate for this delay by ordering immediately that we should be employed in your royal service which is the life we most desire in this world".

When he returned to court in August, O'Neill once again argued that his years of service in the Netherlands warranted greater promotion than he had thus far received. He reminded the king that the O'Neill clan was of royal heritage and deserved to be treated with great honour. However, O'Neill's promotion was delayed as the court was busy dealing with the Franco-Spanish War of 1635 to 1659. In August, by royal decree, the Earls of Tyrone and Tyrconnell were granted a payment of four thousand escudos for their unpaid service in Flanders, in addition to two thousand escudos from army funds to support their continued service.

In 1638, the earls' Irish regiments were transferred from the Army of Flanders to the Basque Country to bolster forces on the northern coast in the face of an expected French invasion. With 1,200 men, the two Irish regiments comprised roughly 10% of the Peninsular force. A French army of 22,000, led by the Prince of Condé and the Duc de la Valette, had begun besieging the Spanish town of Fuenterrabía in July. A small garrison of five companies had been holding out for two months when a relief force of 12,000 Spanish soldiers reached the town in early September. O'Neill and his regiment were among those in the relief force, and the French were quickly routed. The two Irish regiments distinguished themselves at Fuenterrabía, significantly contributing to a Spanish victory.

Following this, O'Neill returned to Madrid. In late September 1638, he asked the king in writing once more for a "house, carriage and maintenance". O'Neill explained that he previously did not insist on these demands as he was staying in Madrid for only a short time. With Philip IV's permission, he returned to Madrid and left his regiment in Navarre, where they were better accommodated compared to his previous stay. Three months later, the king informed the Council that there was ample evidence of O'Neill's merits, and it must be decided what favors should be granted to him.

On 24 May 1639, O'Neill wrote again to Philip IV requesting that he be allowed to lead a Spanish army to Ireland. He wrote:

"In the thirty-two years since my father left Ireland there has never been another occasion like the present for the restoration of Ireland to the Catholics... With four or five thousand men, even with only the Irishmen who are in His Majesty's service here and in Flanders, and arms and munitions for twenty thousand, I shall go in person to accomplish it..."

On 4 June, the Council of State recommended to the king to reject O'Neil's suggestion, but also noted that "[O'Neill] and his Irish followers must be assured that the protection of Your Majesty will not fail them when the occasion is more favourable". Philip IV agreed with his council's advice, adding that "the best of all would be not to answer for the present and to continue delaying the matter".

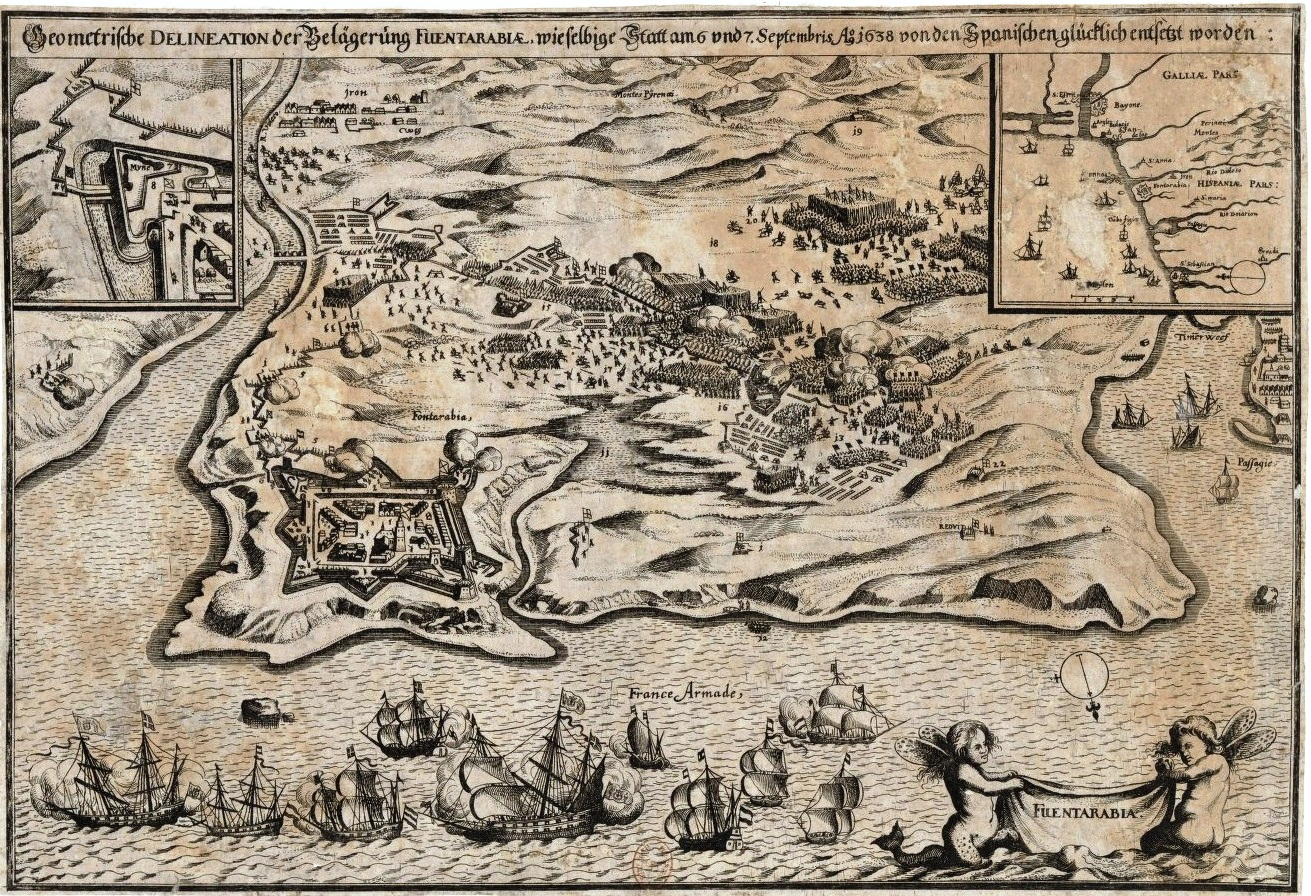
Contemporary etching depicting the siege of Fuenterrabía, where O'Neill distinguished himself.

The Count-Duke of Olivares was highly impressed with the Irish regiments' success at Fuenterrabía, and he sent the regiments to take part in the Siege of Salses in 1640. The Irish earls' participation was decisive in the siege's end. Olivares subsequently boosted attempts to attract Irishmen to the Spanish military. Following the Siege of Salses, the earls' regiments remained in Catalonia for several months.

In 1640, O'Neill was appointed a member of the Supreme Council of War, largely owing to his success at the Siege of Fuenterrabía. This was the first time that an exiled Irishman had held such a high position in the Spanish government, and represented recognition of the work of Irish emigres done in support of Spain. On 27 April 1640, O'Neill was present at a banquet at the Buen Retiro Palace in Madrid. On 18 August, he granted financial help to an Irish woman, Sicilia O'Quilli, in his capacity as a member of the Council of War. O'Quilli claimed that her father and two uncles had died in service to the king.

=== Reapers' War ===
When the Reapers' War began in 1640, O'Neill and his regiment were sent into Catalonia. They entered Ulldecona on the night of 27 October 1640. Ulldecona resident and royal supporter Joan Baptista Giner Martorell wrote that they behaved disruptively: "they have caused some disturbances in the town, notably next to my house... they wanted to tear down the doors, and I have turned them away by giving them wine through the windows..."

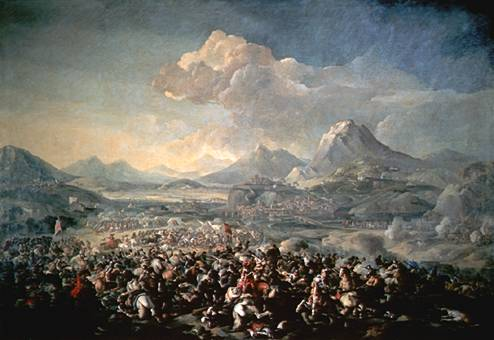
Shane O'Neill died in the Battle of Montjuïc on 29 January 1641.

In 1641, O'Neill's regiment fought at the Battle of Montjuïc, where they suffered heavy casualties. On the morning of 29 January 1641, (Note: The historian Paul Walsh stated that Shane "was killed in Catalonia on January 27, 1641." The historian Micheline Kerney Walsh stated that this date was incorrect, and in fact Shane died on the morning of the 29th.) the Catalans made a premature attack and O'Neill was killed in action near the town of Castelldefels by a musket-ball shot to his chest. He was among the first to be killed, and was reportedly "at the head of his men, both he and they fighting with their accustomed valour". Most of the regiment's soldiers were either killed in battle or taken as prisoners. O'Donnell, who also fought at the battle, retreated southwards with his own decimated regiment.

By order of Philip IV, O'Neill's remains were taken to Madrid and buried beside his half-brother Henry in the family vault in the Chapel of the Blessed Sacrament behind the high altar in the Church of Saint Francis. The contemporary source Commentariiu Rinuccinianus described O'Neill and O'Donnell thus: "Tyrconnell, an accomplished courtier, expert in matters of war, of the greatest courage, but less prudent than Tyrone, a man of singular judgement". O'Neill was his father's last surviving son.

Irish rebel Rory O'Moore, unaware of O'Neill's death, sought his assistance for the Irish Rebellion of 1641. News of the death took months to reach O'Moore and caused some confusion among the rebellion's organisers. O'Neill was eager to assist in an Irish rebellion, and would have done so in his lifetime were it not for his obligations in Catalonia. O'Donnell request permission from the Spanish Navy to travel to Ireland, intending to take part in the 1641 rebellion, but this was refused. He later died in July 1642 in a naval battle off Catalonia. The earls' deaths were a major blow to Irish expectations that they would lead an Irish rebellion.

== Family and legacy ==
During his time in Madrid in the early 1630s, O'Neill became acquainted with Hugh Albert O'Donnell's cousin Isabel O'Donnell. (Spanish: Doña Ysabel O’Donnell). Isabel, a daughter of Cathal O'Donnell, held comparable standing with O'Neill in the Gaelic nobility. The couple had a son out of wedlock, Hugo Eugenio (Hugh Eugene) O'Neill, who was born in Madrid on 15 November 1633. A few days before Hugo's birth, O'Neill returned to his regiment in the Spanish Netherlands. Isabel later became a nun in the Convent of La Concepcion Real de Calatrava; she eventually left the convent due to ill health. O'Neill also had a daughter named Catalina by an unknown mother.

When O'Neill wrote his will on 18 September 1640, he mentioned that he had married the daughter of Madama de Buixln. He left his children in the care of Gaspar Bernaben, his business agent and friend. In his will, he stated that his son Hugo should learn the Irish language and that his daughter Catalina should become a nun. In the event of her brother's death, she was to inherit their father's possessions and money. As O'Neill requested in his will, Philip IV legitimised Hugo, and Hugo succeeded his father as colonel of the Irish regiment and "Conde de Tyrone".

In his will, O'Neill requested that, if Hugo had no sons, the earldom pass to (in order):

1. Conn O'Neill, son of Cormac MacBaron O'Neill
2. Hugh Dubh O'Neill, son of Art Óg O'Neill, son of Art MacBaron O'Neill
3. Owen Roe O'Neill, son of Art MacBaron O'Neill
4. The closest relative of Shane O'Neill the Proud

== Notes ==
Shane O'Neill, 3rd Earl of Tyrone
Spanish nobility
Preceded by Hugh O'Neill	Earl of Tyrone; 1626–1641	Succeeded by Hugo Eugenio O'Neill

Shane O'Neill, 3rd Earl of Tyrone
Peerage of Ireland
Preceded by Henry O'Neill	Baron Dungannon; 1610–1614	Succeeded by Title attainted
