= Henry O'Neill (soldier) =

Irish soldier and nobleman

5th Baron Dungannon (de jure)
- Tenure: 1609–1610
- Predecessor: Hugh O'Neill, 4th Baron Dungannon
- Successor: Shane O'Neill, 6th Baron Dungannon
- Born: c. 1586; Ulster, Ireland
- Died: 25 August 1610 (aged 23); Aranda de Duero, Spain
- Buried: Madrid, Spain
- Issue: None
- Father: Hugh O'Neill, Earl of Tyrone
- Mother: Siobhán O'Donnell

Colonel Henry O'Neill (Irish: Enri Ó Néill; Spanish: Enrique Oneil; c. 1586 – 25 August 1610) was an Irish-born nobleman and soldier who served with the Spanish army in the Eighty Years' War.

In 1600 he was relocated to Spain to strengthen relations between his father, Irish confederacy leader Hugh O'Neill, and the Spanish government. Following the end of the Nine Years' War (1603) and the Anglo-Spanish War (1604), Henry continued to live in Spain and expressed interest in military service. English officials feared his entrance into the Spanish military could renew conflict. Nevertheless, in 1605 Henry was made colonel of the first Irish regiment (tercio) in the Spanish army. He served for many years in the Low Countries, before dying in Spain of illness, aged 23.

Henry was de jure 5th Baron Dungannon by the patent of the earldom, though he was never recognised as such by the Irish House of Lords.

== Family background ==
Henry O'Neill was born c. 1586, the second son of Irish lord Hugh O'Neill, Earl of Tyrone, and his second wife Siobhán O'Donnell. He was descended from the Gaelic Irish clans of O'Neill and O'Donnell of Tír Eoghain and Tyrconnell respectively. Henry had several older sisters, Sarah, Mary and Alice, as well as an older brother Hugh O'Neill, 4th Baron Dungannon. Siobhán died in early 1591. Tyrone noted that Hugh and Henry were in fosterage in August 1594. In 1599, English writer Sir John Harrington described brothers Hugh and Henry as "of good cheerful aspect, freckled, not tall, but strong, well-set, and acquainted with the English tongue".

== Education ==
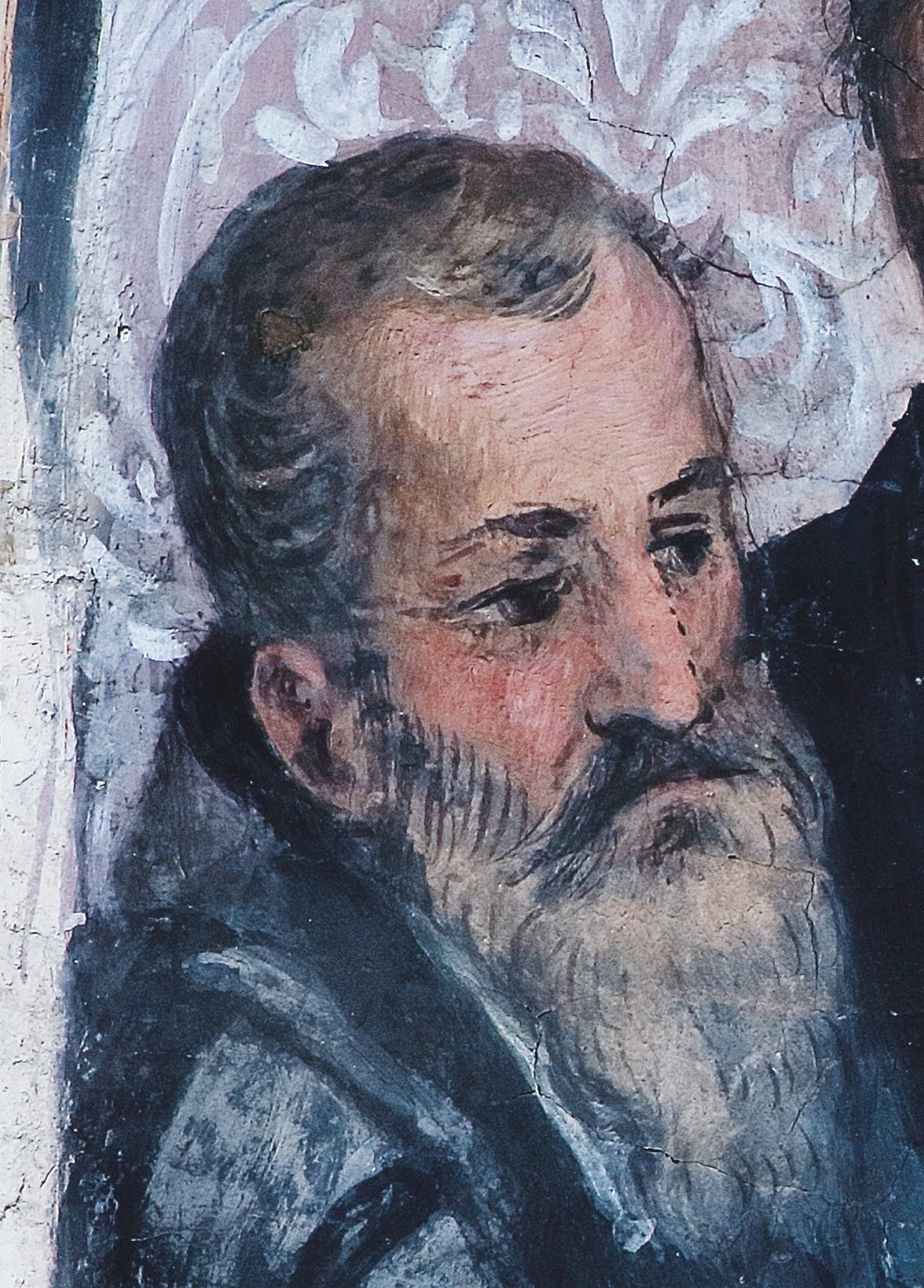
Henry's father was Hugh O'Neill, Earl of Tyrone.

Henry's father Tyrone led the Irish confederacy during the Nine Years' War with England. He sought military assistance from Habsburg Spain, which was then also at war with England. In April 1600, Tyrone stimulated the Irish-Spanish alliance by sending Henry, then aged 13, to Spain. (Note: Irish historian Charles Patrick Meehan stated that "it has been often asserted that he was sent to Spain in his childhood as a hostage for his father's allegiance to Philip III, but this was not the fact; for he was brought to that country by his tutor, father MacCaughwell, to complete his studies at Salamanca, and make himself perfect in military science, as became the son of the prince of Tyrone." Micheline Kerney Walsh agreed that Henry was "sent by his father... to be educated in Spain".)

Tyrone wanted his Spanish footman Pedro Blanco to accompany Henry, but King Philip III refused as Blanco was of greater use in Ireland. Henry was escorted to Spain by one of Philip's most trusted commanders, Don Martín de la Cerda. He was relocated to Salamanca for his education, and was given an allowance of two hundred ducats per month. Henry settled permanently in Spain. His tutor at the University of Salamanca was Irish Franciscan Hugh MacCaughwell, who was also a graduate of the university.

In 1601, Henry took the Franciscan habit, causing much concern amongst the Spanish Council of State, and leading to weeks of discussion. Mateo de Oviedo, Spanish Franciscan and the future Catholic Archbishop of Dublin, was ordered by Philip III to go to Salamanca and deal with Henry. Henry eventually gave up his ambitions to become a friar.

In January 1602, Hugh Roe O'Donnell, the O'Donnell clan chief, and a half-brother of Henry's mother, arrived in Spain seeking military reinforcements from Philip III. O'Donnell asked to see Henry, and so Henry was summoned to meet his uncle at Zamora. At this time, Henry was nearing the end of his studies. He obtained his degree in arts in July 1602. In 1603, Henry was "much esteemed and well received amongst the Spaniards".

== Anglo-Spanish tension ==
Throughout 1603, English forces travelled across Ulster, destroying crops and livestock, and leading to famine conditions. Tyrone's surrender in early 1603 ended the Nine Years' War, and the Treaty of London in August 1604 ended the Anglo-Spanish War. Henry became a focus for English authorities, who feared the Irish nobility's continued allegiance to Spain could lead to a renewed Anglo-Irish or Anglo-Spanish war. Lord Deputy Charles Blount offered Tyrone generous peace terms to placate this threat. Tyrone also felt pressure to placate the English government and he asked Henry to return to Ireland. Henry refused his father's request as Ulster was in a depressed and unappealing condition. He asked to postpone his return for a few years. This attitude deeply troubled Tyrone, who was "doubtful and jealous less the state of England should interpret it amiss and therefore as he saith, he hath written back unto him [Henry] that if he will not presently return hither he will never give him one foot of land here". Tyrone was also wary that Henry might undertake military action without the approval of King James I.

Following the end of the Nine Years' War, the social position of Irish Catholics declined significantly within just a few years. Many Catholic noblemen fled Ireland to seek refuge in continental Europe; most went to Spain, Ireland's only ally during the war. The concept emerged of an Irish regiment in the Spanish army. It is clear that Henry was engaged by the idea of commanding his own regiment; he asked the Spanish government for permission to move to the Spanish Netherlands to fight in the Dutch Revolt. Despite protests from the Earl of Tyrconnell—Tyrone's ally, and a half-brother of Henry's mother—that this would offend James I, the Spanish government allowed Henry to take up residence in the Spanish Netherlands. He was granted 2,000 ducats in living allowance for the journey.

Subsequently, Henry—almost certainly on the advice of Archbishop Florence Conry—requested to be appointed colonel of an Irish regiment. This placed Philip III in a difficult situation. The creation of such a regiment would be seen as an aggression by England, especially considering that the Treaty of London had only been recently signed. The Spanish government recognised that an Irish regiment would be valuable in combating English forces in the Low Countries. This regiment would give employment to the scattered Irish refugees and would also free the Kingdom of Galicia from financial burden. Due to diplomatic issues, Philip III was recommended to put off establishing the Irish regiment until James I gave his approval.

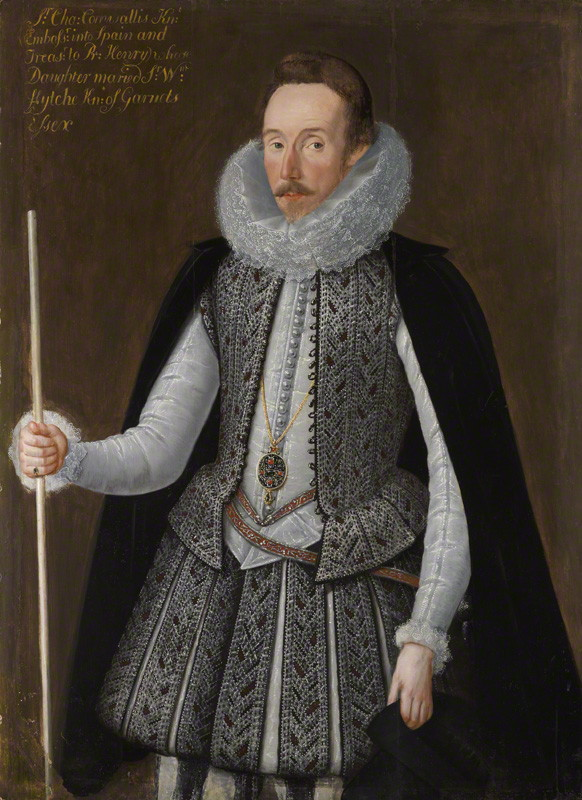
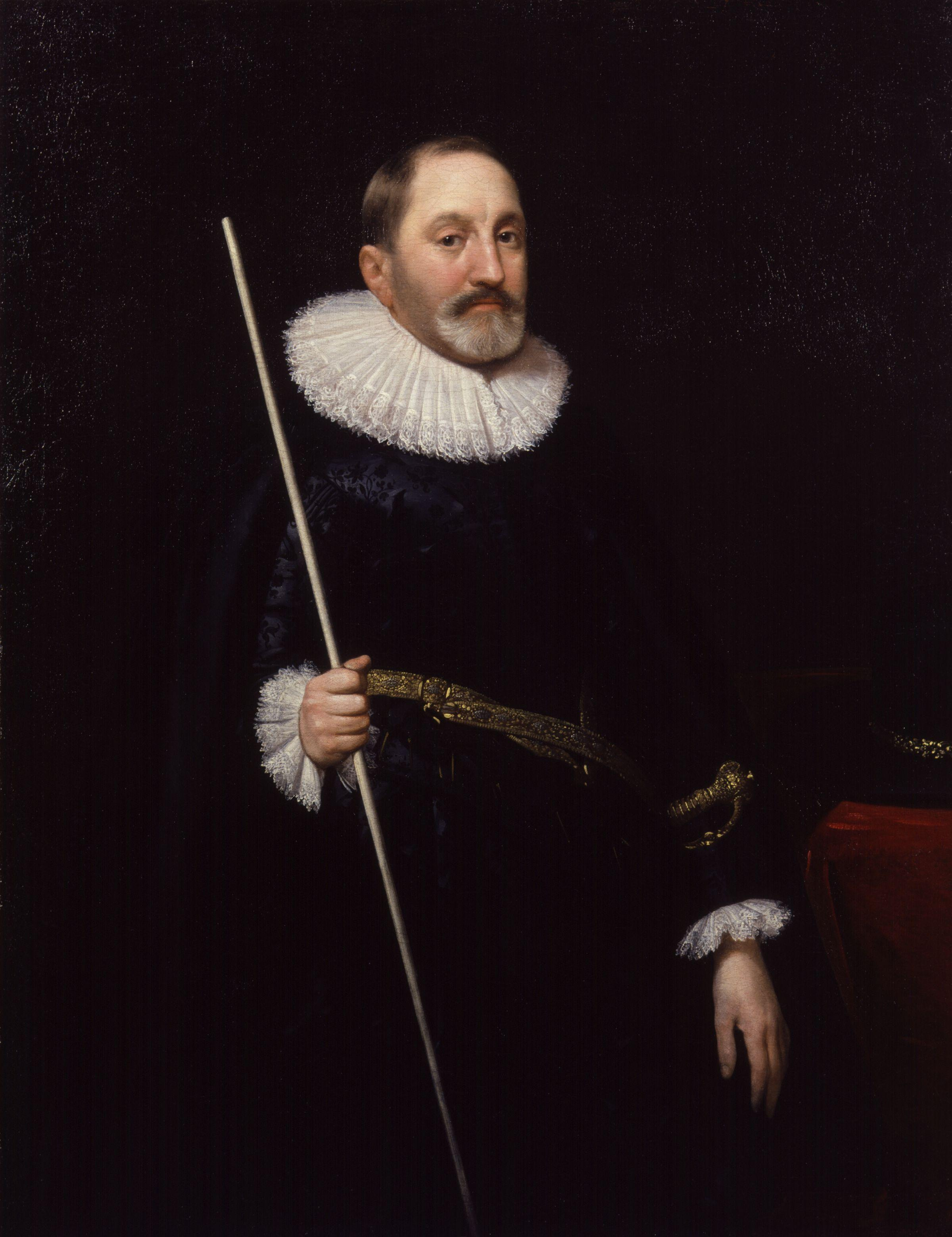
English politicians Charles Cornwallis (left) and Thomas Edmondes attempted to stop Henry's appointment as colonel of the first Irish regiment.

In April 1605, it was reported that James I had approved a levy of 2,000 English soldiers, 1,500 Scottish soldiers, and 500 Irish soldiers in the Spanish army. Philip III's ambassador, the Duke of Escalona, received 800 escudos to pay ten Scottish and Irish captains, each of whom was to recruit 150 men. The O'Neill family spread news of the recruitment to assemble volunteers across the British Isles, so Henry could assure the Spanish Council of State he had the large numbers necessary. By September 1605, Charles Cornwallis, the new English ambassador to Spain, believed he had proof that Henry had submitted to the Council of State. Cornwallis tasked Thomas Edmondes, the English ambassador in Flanders, with preventing Henry from recruiting an Irish regiment and joining military service. In early September 1605, many exiled Irish began arriving in the Low Countries, causing tension in the English government. In late October, Henry arrived at the Binche court of Albert VII, Archduke of Austria. It was during this meeting that Henry probably discussed his future, and was directed to placate the suspicions of English officials. Henry took up residence in Brussels and became acquainted with Edmondes. He reaffirmed his allegiance to King James I and claimed that neither he nor Philip III would accept a commission to colonel an Irish regiment without James I's consent.

In 1605, English Catholics made an attempt on James I's life, known as the Gunpowder Plot. The resulting anti-Catholic backlash caused James I to reconsider his decision and halt the departure of new recruits to the Catholic Netherlands. Most of the English and Scottish recruits were loyal to their king and subsequently returned to Britain; the Irish recruits had no such loyalty and stayed. The English government subsequently attempted to destroy the Irish regiment.

== Military career ==
Having successfully pacified negotiations with England, in early December 1605 Henry was made colonel of the first Irish regiment in the Spanish army. To distinguish it from subsequently-formed Irish regiments, it eventually became known as the "Old Irish Regiment" (Spanish: El Tercio Viejo Irelandés) or the "Regiment of Tyrone". On 22 December, Henry wrote to Robert Cecil, the English royal secretary, reconfirming his allegiance to the English Crown.

"[I wish to acquaint] his highness [James I] of my great desire to employ myself in his majesties service when it shall please his highness to command me, and that I refused to be employed [in the Spanish Netherlands] until I understand by the council of Spain that it was my sovereign's will [that] I should be employed hither upon, I am most desirous to serve your honour to the uttermost of my power."

— Henry O'Neill

Since Henry had no military experience, his second-in-command, veteran soldier Edward FitzGerald, played an important role in the training of Henry and his regiment. FitzGerald was elected sergeant major due to his experience serving in the Spanish military for seventeen consecutive years; he had also trained Irish confederate soldiers during the Nine Years' War. He governed the regiment from a strictly military standpoint.

Giolla Brighde O hEoghusa wrote on 19 September 1605 that Henry was then expected in Flanders. Henry's regiment was sent to the Low Countries to fight against the Dutch Republic. Towards the end of 1605 he arrived in Brussels, where he served under commander Ambrogio Spinola.

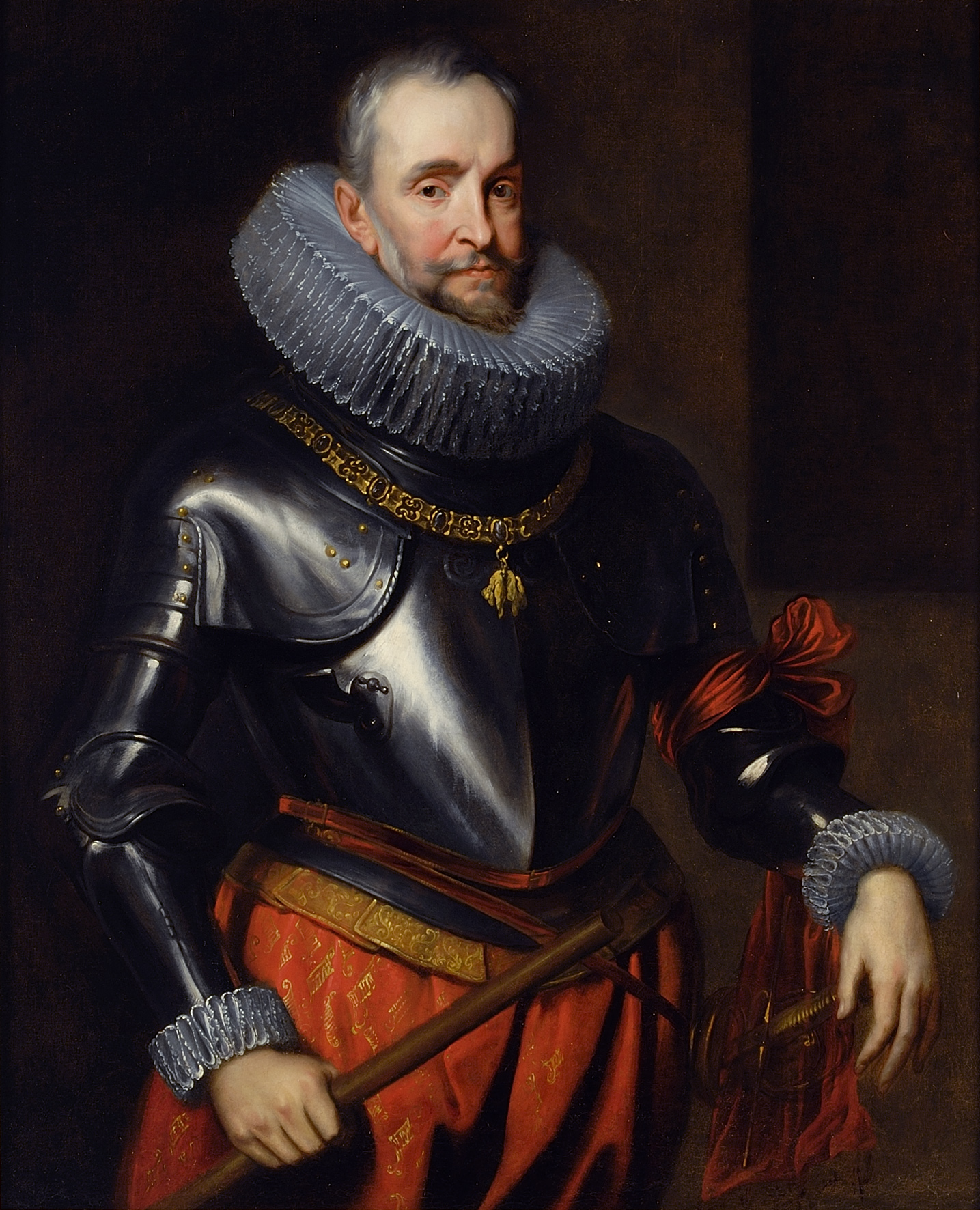
Henry served under commander Ambrogio Spinola.

Other companies of Irish soldiers were formed in the Spanish military. After the naval Battle of Dover on 13 June 1605, Captain Hugh Mostian's Irish company was absorbed into Henry's regiment. Mostian and Henry must have come into conflict as the former later resigned as captain. During Henry's 1606 campaign, his regiment saw action in Flanders and Germany. Peace negotiations led to a cessation of hostilities in early 1607.

Hostility towards Tyrone increased sharply following Lord Deputy Blount's death in 1606. In 1607, Tyrone was due to travel to London to settle a legal case when information reached him that the government intended to imprison him, or possibly execute him, on account of his involvement in a treasonous plot. It is unclear from where he obtained this intelligence, whether this plot actually existed and if the government intended to arrest Tyrone. A group of confederate allies, including clan chief Cuconnacht Maguire, organised an escape plan for Tyrone and his allies. Maguire travelled to Brussels where he contacted Henry and explained his plan to bring a ship to the Donegal coast to facilitate an escape. With money from Albert VII, they were able to hire a ship at Nantes and disguise it. The ship sailed from Dunkirk to Tyrconnell in August 1607. On 14 September, many of Henry's family, including his father Tyrone and older brother Hugh, fled Ireland for the Continent in what is known as the Flight of the Earls. Henry obtained a warrant for his family members so they could travel to Spain. At Halle in late October, whilst his regiment was quartered in the Bruges district, Henry met many of his kith and kin on their journey through Flanders. Henry remained in his father's company until they parted at Namur. He remained in Leuven for a time to watch over the noble children left behind, which included his younger half-brothers Shane and Brian and the Earl of Tyrconnell's son Hugh Albert O'Donnell.

English administrators viewed Henry's regiment with suspicion. They feared Tyrone would return to Ireland with this regiment to take his land back. Lord Deputy Arthur Chichester discussed methods of destroying the regiment, which Edmondes called "the gunpowder regiment". Henry discovered English spies in his regiment. The spies were removed under a pretext, so that the English government would not realise their spies had been caught.

News of the Plantation of Ulster in 1609 prompted Tyrone to organise a formal reconciliation with James I. Tyrone asked Henry to travel to Madrid to participate in peace negotiations. This timing was opportune for Henry, as the Spanish Netherlands and the Dutch Republic had recently signed a twelve-year truce. On 13 August 1609, Albert VII gave Henry permission to leave his post for six months to travel to Spain "on personal business and on business of his father". He was accompanied by three of his officers: Owen Roe O'Neill (his first cousin, serving as a bodyguard), John Rath (captain of the Flight of the Earls) and Jenkins FitzSimons (who served Tyrone in Ireland). Albert VII described Henry in glowing terms: "[he has served] with so much valour and in such a manner that, both on this account and because of his very promising behaviour, he deserves all favour". Despite the combined efforts of Henry, Archbishop Conry and secretary Matthew Tully to organise Tyrone's reconciliation and return to Ireland, Philip III could not be persuaded.

Henry's older brother Hugh died in Rome in September 1609, which made Henry the eldest surviving son of Tyrone. Henry succeeded his brother as de jure 5th Baron Dungannon. (Note: Burke's Peerage claims that, because of the attainder, Henry did not succeed his elder brother as Baron Dungannon. However, this attainder was only actioned in 1614, which was after both Hugh and Henry had died.) Around 1610, Henry and Fr. Hugh MacCaughwell lobbied to have Hugh Albert O'Donnell's foster parents reinstated.

== Death ==
During his preparations to return to Flanders, Henry became ill due to an epidemic. Expecting his death, Henry sent a petition to Philip III begging him not to fill the vacant colonelcy of his regiment without the consent of his father Tyrone. Both Henry and Conry feared the English would try to replace Henry with a colonel sympathetic to the English government.

Henry died on 25 August 1610, aged 23, in the Spanish town of Aranda de Duero. (Note: Many 19th-century and early 20th-century historians were not aware of the exact date of Henry's death. Because the Spanish earldom of Tyrone was conferred on Henry's younger half-brother Shane in 1626, historians often stated that Henry died in the 1620s.) (Note: Conversely, Séan Bonner claimed that Henry "was killed, almost certainly by members of his own regiment, in a row".) He died in debt as his allowance from Philip III was not paid regularly. He had no issue, though it is said that while commanding the Irish regiment in the Low Countries, he won the heart of a lady with "blue blood" in her veins. He may have been married at the time of his death. On the 28th, Philip III informed the Spanish ambassador at Rome of Henry's death, praising Henry for his service to Spain. Henry's remains were taken to Madrid and buried in the family vault in the Chapel of the Blessed Sacrament behind the high altar in the Church of Saint Francis.

Two weeks after Henry's death, Conry wrote to Philip III, urging him to immediately appoint Owen Roe O'Neill to the colonelcy. Philip III had not made a decision when he received a letter from Tyrone requesting that his younger son Shane—then aged about 11—be appointed to the colonelcy. Philip III agreed to this request, and recommended Owen Roe be made major of the regiment. As Shane was Tyrone's eldest surviving son, Shane succeeded Henry as de jure 6th Baron Dungannon.

== Ancestry ==
Ancestors of Henry O'Neill (soldier) (Note: Hugh O'Neill's parents were Matthew "Feardorcha" O'Neill and Siobhán Maguire. Siobhán O'Donnell's parents were Hugh McManus O'Donnell and his first wife, Nuala O'Neill. Matthew O'Neill's parents were Conn Bacagh O'Neill and Alison Kelly. Siobhán Maguire's father was Cúconnacht Maguire. Hugh McManus O'Donnell's parents were Manus O'Donnell and Siobhán O'Neill. Nuala O'Neill's father was Shane O'Neill.)

8. Conn Bacagh O'Neill, 1st Earl of Tyrone
4. Matthew O'Neill, 1st Baron Dungannon
9. Alison Kelly
2. Hugh O'Neill, Earl of Tyrone
10. Cúconnacht Maguire, Lord of Fermanagh
5. Siobhán Maguire
1. Henry O'Neill
12. Manus O'Donnell, Lord of Tyrconnell
4. Hugh McManus O'Donnell, Lord of Tyrconnell
13. Siobhán Ó Néill
3. Siobhán O'Donnell, Countess of Tyrone
14. Shane O'Neill
5. Nuala O'Neill

Henry O'Neill (soldier)
Peerage of Ireland
Preceded by Hugh O'Neill	Baron Dungannon; 1609–1610	Succeeded by Shane O'Neill
