= Hugo Eugenio O'Neill, 4th Earl of Tyrone =

Spanish nobleman and soldier (1633–1660)

Hugo Eugenio O'Neill
- 4th Earl of Tyrone
- Tenure: 29 January 1641 – 2 October 1660
- Predecessor: Shane O'Neill, 3rd Earl of Tyrone
- Born: 15 November 1633; Madrid, Crown of Castile
- Died: 2 October 1660 (aged 26); Madrid, Crown of Castile

Hugo Eugenio O'Neill, 4th Earl of Tyrone (15 November 1633 – 2 October 1660), was a Spanish nobleman and soldier. He was the son of Irish-born soldier Shane O'Neill, 3rd Earl of Tyrone and grandson of Irish lord Hugh O'Neill, Earl of Tyrone.

== Early life and family ==
Hugo Eugenio O'Neill was born in Madrid on 15 November 1633, the illegitimate son of Shane O'Neill, 3rd Earl of Tyrone, and Isabel O'Donnell. He was named after his paternal grandfather Hugh O'Neill, chief of the O'Neill clan and commander of the confederacy of Irish lords during the Nine Years' War. Following the confederacy's surrender in 1603, Hugh and his son Shane emigrated from Ireland to Catholic Europe in the Flight of the Earls. Shane entered the Spanish military and took command of its first Irish regiment (tercio), known as the "Old Irish Regiment" (Spanish: El Tercio Viejo Irelandés) or the "Regiment of Tyrone". Isabel was descended from the noble O'Donnell clan. She was a daughter of Cathal O'Donnell and a cousin of Irish-Spanish soldier Hugh Albert O'Donnell.

Hugo O'Neill's parents became acquainted whilst both were living in Madrid in the early 1630s. A few days before Hugo's birth, Shane had to return to his regiment in the Spanish Netherlands. He entrusted Gaspar Bernaben, his business agent and friend, with the child's upbringing. Bernaben added the name "Eugenio" for Hugo's baptism, as the child was born on the feast of St. Eugene. This was also to "conceal" Hugo's Irish heritage. Bernaben became Hugo's godfather and raised him.

Shane returned to Madrid after fighting in the Siege of Fuenterrabía in 1638, acknowledging Hugo as his son and spending two weeks with the young boy. In 1640 Shane declared Hugo as his successor.

Isabel later became a nun in the Convent of La Concepcion Real de Calatrava, but she eventually left the convent due to ill health.

Shane also had a daughter, Catalina O'Neill; her mother's identity is unknown.

== Succession as Earl ==
Shane died on 29 January 1641 in the Battle of Montjuïc. Per a request in his will, Philip IV of Spain legitimised Hugo O'Neill. Hugo succeeded his late father as 4th Earl (Note: The Spanish title was Conde de Tyrone. Conde is usually translated into English as "Count"; Micheline Walsh uses "Earl".) of Tyrone and as colonel of the Irish regiment. Catalina and Hugo were left in Bernaben's care. It was Shane's wish that Bernaben should continue to serve and care for Hugo until he reached a suitable age. He also wished for Hugo to learn the Irish language.

== Career ==
O'Neill was admitted to the order of Calatrava on 29 April 1644.

== Death ==
He died in Madrid on 2 October 1660, aged twenty-six.

== Ancestry ==
Ancestors of Hugo Eugenio O'Neill, 4th Earl of Tyrone (Note: Hugh O'Neill's parents were Matthew "Feardorcha" O'Neill and Siobhán Maguire.)

8. Matthew O'Neill, 1st Baron Dungannon
4. Hugh O'Neill, Earl of Tyrone
9. Siobhán Maguire, Baroness Dungannon
2. Shane O'Neill, 3rd Earl of Tyrone
10. Hugh Magennis, Baron of Iveagh
5. Catherine Magennis, Countess of Tyrone
11. Annabel Reilly
1. Hugo Eugenio O'Neill, 4th Earl of Tyrone
12.
4. Cathal O'Donnell
13.
3. Isabel O'Donnell
5. Cathalina Macgra (McGrath)
