= Donnell Ballagh O'Cahan =

Irish landowner (died c. 1617)

- Died: c. 1617; Tower of London, England
- Spouse: Mary O'Donnell (m. 1593; sep. 1598); Rose O'Neill (m. 1598; div. 1607); Honora O'Cahan (m. 1607)

Donnell Ballagh O'Cahan (died c. 1617) was an Irish landowner in Ulster. A vassal of Hugh O'Neill, Earl of Tyrone, O'Cahan was frequently in rebellion alongside his lord in the closing years of the 16th century. Although he did not go into exile with Tyrone, he claimed to have been betrayed by the English Crown, which he accused of failing to keep to an agreement over a large grant of lands. Arrested for treason, he was never brought to trial but was held captive in the Tower of London until his death sometime around 1617.

== Family background ==
Donnell Ballagh O'Cahan was one of several sons of Rory O'Cahan (d.1598), chief of the Ó Catháin clan in north-west Ulster. The ruling family controlled the territory traditionally known as O'Cahan's Country, centred on the Roe Valley in what is now County Londonderry.

Among Donnell’s brothers was Manus O’Cahan (c.1568–1643). The Dictionary of Irish Biography notes that tensions existed within the family and records that Manus was dissatisfied with the lands allotted to him. Such disputes were common within Gaelic lordships, where younger sons or brothers of the chief were granted subordinate estates while the principal inheritance remained with the head of the dynasty.

Following the defeat of the Gaelic lords after the Nine Years’ War and the subsequent Plantation of Ulster, much of the former O’Cahan territory was redistributed to the London Companies. Some members of the family nevertheless retained smaller estates as “native freeholders”. Plantation surveys from the early seventeenth century record Manus O’Cahan as holding land within the proportions of the Mercers’ Company and the Goldsmiths’ Company, amounting to roughly 2,000 acres.

The Mercers’ Company lands included parts of the barony of Loughinsholin around Maghera and Killelagh. Within this district lies the townland Tirkane (Irish: Tír Catháin, meaning “land of the O’Cahans”), a place-name reflecting the historical presence of the family in the region. Later seventeenth-century records show that the surname O’Cahan, often rendered as Kane, remained present in the same locality. The 1659 Census of Ireland lists the name among the principal Irish surnames of the barony of Loughinsholin, while the Hearth Money Rolls of 1663 record several Kane households in the Maghera area, indicating the survival of a branch of the O’Cahan family there after the Plantation period.

== Properties ==
O'Cahan was a major Ulster landholder and has been described as "the last in a long line of chieftains" ruling the area between the River Bann in Belfast to the River Foyle in Derry, which he held off the O'Neill Earls of Tyrone as their liegeman (ur ri—or under king—in Gaelic). His main property was in Dungiven. He also held Limavady. He spent much of the 1590s in armed rebellion with Tyrone against the crown; his lands were "viciously ravaged" by Docwra until O'Cahan surrendered. About a third of O'Cahan's lands in Londonderry were granted to Hugh O'Neill, Earl of Tyrone, who was also O'Cahan's father-in-law.

== Marriages ==
In June 1593, Donnell and his father Rory acknowledged Tyrone as their lord. Around the same time, O'Cahan married Mary O'Donnell (sister of Red Hugh O'Donnell). O'Cahan and Mary had a son (named Rory Oge O'Cahan) and a daughter.

On 14 April 1598, his father died and O'Cahan succeeded to the O'Cahan chieftainship. The same year, O'Cahan renewed his alliance with Tyrone by leaving Mary and marrying Tyrone's daughter Rose. (Note: The historian Terry Clavin states that their marriage was in 1599. The historian Matthew McGinty puts it "around 1598".) Rose had divorced from Red Hugh O'Donnell by 1598. It seems O'Cahan was never formally divorced from Mary which created enmity between him and his new father-in-law.

In 1607, with English authorities turned against Tyrone, George Montgomery, the new Protestant Bishop of Derry, encouraged O'Cahan to leave Rose and return to his first wife. Montgomery wrote to Lord Deputy Arthur Chichester on 4 March 1607: "the breach between [O'Cahan] and his landlord [the Earl of Tyrone] will be the greater by means of [the Earl's] daughter, his reputed wife, whom he has resolved to leave, having a former wife lawfully married to him." O'Cahan repudiated his marriage to Rose in 1607 and remarried to another woman, Honora O'Cahan. Tyrone would ask for his daughter's dowry back, but O'Cahan retained it. After O'Cahan was arrested in 1608, Chichester suggested placing O'Cahan's eldest son with the Provost of Trinity College.

Honora bore O'Cahan a son, Daniel Geimhleach (meaning "fettered", as he was conceived during O'Cahan's incarceration).

== Flight of the Earls ==
O'Cahan was knighted on 20 June 1607. (Note: The historian Kate Newmann stated that O'Cahan was knighted after the Flight of the Earls.) In September, Tyrone and other earls fled the country in what is known as the Flight of the Earls.

In early 1608, O'Cahan's brother joined the rebellion of Cahir O'Doherty, and although O'Cahan was not officially implicated, he was suspected of having knowledge of the uprising. He was arrested but never tried. The antiquarian Francis Joseph Bigger has suggested that he was rumoured to have attempted flight with Tyrone and the other rebel lords, and had only been prevented from doing so by an "accidental delay in crossing some ferry on the road". In the event, O'Cahan remained in Limavady Castle following Tyrone's flight. Sir Arthur Chichester—the Crown's Lord Deputy in Ulster—reasoned, says Bigger, that this indicated not only his sympathy for the rebels but mens rea also. This was compounded by the fact that, in English eyes, O'Cahan "had become troublesome, and almost unmanageable of late, so, everything considered, it was thought best to take him also into special keeping at Dublin Castle". Bigger notes that, although O'Cahan had remained loyal to his liege lord throughout the latter's seven-year campaign at the Crown, in 1608 he joined the major English statesman and commander in Ireland, Henry Docwra, on condition that O'Cahan would receive sufficient grants and lands to enable him to establish himself independently of Tyrone, and would no longer hold his estates in fief.

== Downfall and death ==
O'Cahan's arrangement with Docwra regarding his lands was agreed to by the government, but Chichester managed to persuade the government to repudiate the deal. O'Cahan, says Bigger, went "frantic": his behaviour allowed Chichester to claim that O'Cahan had spoken and acted treasonably. O'Cahan was arrested in 1608 and spent the rest of his life imprisoned in the Tower of London, dying there around 1617. (Note: Newmann stated that O'Cahan died around 1626.)

During his imprisonment, the Plantation of Ulster continued westwards. However, his legal title to the Bann−Foyle region was not contested and, even though O'Cahan was never to return, no individual planter ever laid claim to his estate.
