= Rose O'Neill (Irish noblewoman) =

Gaelic Irish noblewoman (fl. 1587–1607)

- Queen consort of Tyrconnell
- Born: Sixteenth century
- Noble family: O'Neill dynasty
- Spouses: Hugh Roe O'Donnell (m. 1592; div. 1597); Donnell Ballagh O'Cahan (m. 1598; div. 1607)
- Father: Hugh O'Neill, Earl of Tyrone

Rose O'Neill (Irish: Róisín Dubh Ní Néill; fl. 1587–1607) was a Gaelic Irish noblewoman and queen consort of Tyrconnell. She was the daughter of Hugh O'Neill and wife of Hugh Roe O'Donnell, the two leaders of the Irish confederacy during the Nine Years' War. Her marriage to O'Donnell was a deliberate move to unite the O'Neills and the O'Donnells, the two most powerful Irish clans of their day. Their marriage had formally ended by 1598.

She has been the subject of several poems and songs, particularly rebel song "Róisín Dubh", making her somewhat of a nationalist figure for Gaelic Ireland. In poetry, her name is often anglicised Rosaleen.

== Family background ==
Rose (Note: Darren McGettigan anglicises her name as Róise.) was born into the O'Neill dynasty, specifically the MacBaron branch, in the sixteenth century, probably before 1574. The O'Neills were the most powerful Gaelic Irish clan of their time, but by the mid-to-late sixteenth century, they had fallen into internal conflict due to a succession dispute. The clan split into many septs: the MacShanes, the MacBarons and the followers of Turlough Luineach O'Neill. It is possible this conflict influenced her upbringing.

=== Parentage ===
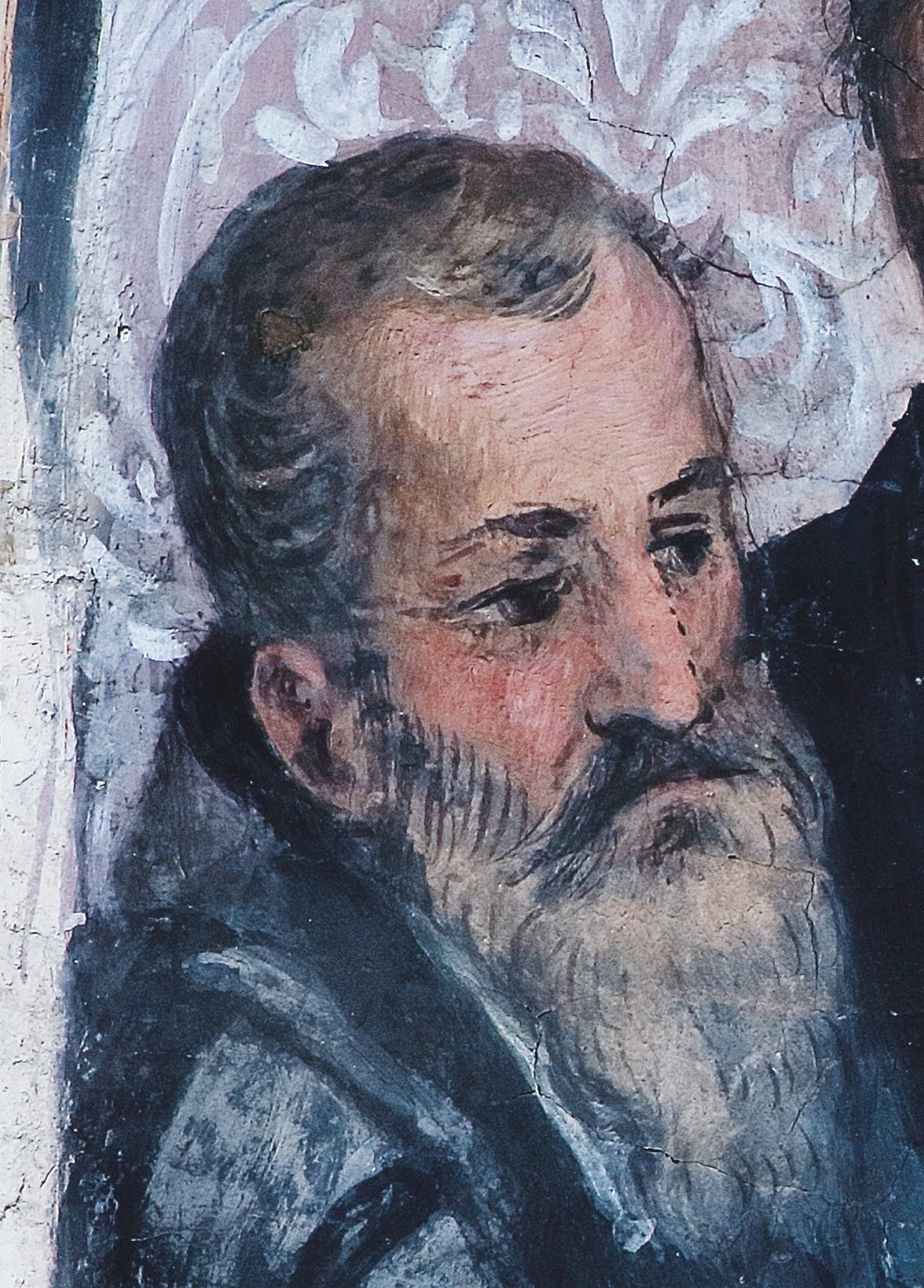
Rose's father, the Earl of Tyrone

Rose's father, Hugh O'Neill, Earl of Tyrone, was the son of Feardorcha "Matthew" O'Neill, 1st Baron Dungannon, and his wife Siobhán Maguire.

The identity of Rose's mother is unclear, as Tyrone is known to have four wives and various mistresses. Historian Robert Dunlop believed that Rose's mother was Catherine Magennis—however, since Rose was betrothed to Hugh Roe O'Donnell in the late 1580s, and Magennis married Tyrone in the 1590s, this is unlikely. According to brother-in-law Niall Garve O'Donnell, Rose was not a daughter of Tyrone's second wife Siobhán O'Donnell.

Historian Hiram Morgan presumes that Rose came from Tyrone's annulled first marriage to a daughter of Brian McPhelim O'Neill (possibly named Katherine or Feodora). Historians Morwenna Donnelly and Jerrold Casway confirm that this is possible. Historian Darren McGettigan agrees that Rose was a full-sibling of Conn Mac An Iarla, Tyrone's son by the daughter of Brian McPhelim. If so, Rose would be seen by the English as illegitimate. Indeed, loyalist Niall Garve O'Donnell described her as "illegitimate" in a 1606 deposition. This could make Rose's birthdate sometime between the earliest date for Tyrone's first marriage, c. 1569, and its annulment in 1574.

It has also been suggested that Rose was a child of a concubine of Tyrone, which would make her illegitimate under both English law and Gaelic brehon law. However, Rose's status as the daughter of a powerful and ascendant Irish lord might have led Hugh Roe O'Donnell and Gaelic society to overlook any issues relating to her legitimacy.

== Marriages ==
=== Hugh Roe O'Donnell ===
By 1587, Rose was formally betrothed to Hugh Roe O'Donnell, tanist and son to the O'Donnell clan chief. Hugh Roe O'Donnell was 14 at the time—it is likely Rose was around the same age. The O'Donnell clan, Tyrconnell's ruling noble family, were one of the strongest Irish clans in Ulster, and thus were typically rivals to the O'Neills. This dynastic marriage would further cement a growing alliance between two clans who had traditionally been mortal enemies for centuries. To this end, Tyrone had married Siobhan O'Donnell, Hugh Roe's elder half-sister, in June 1574.

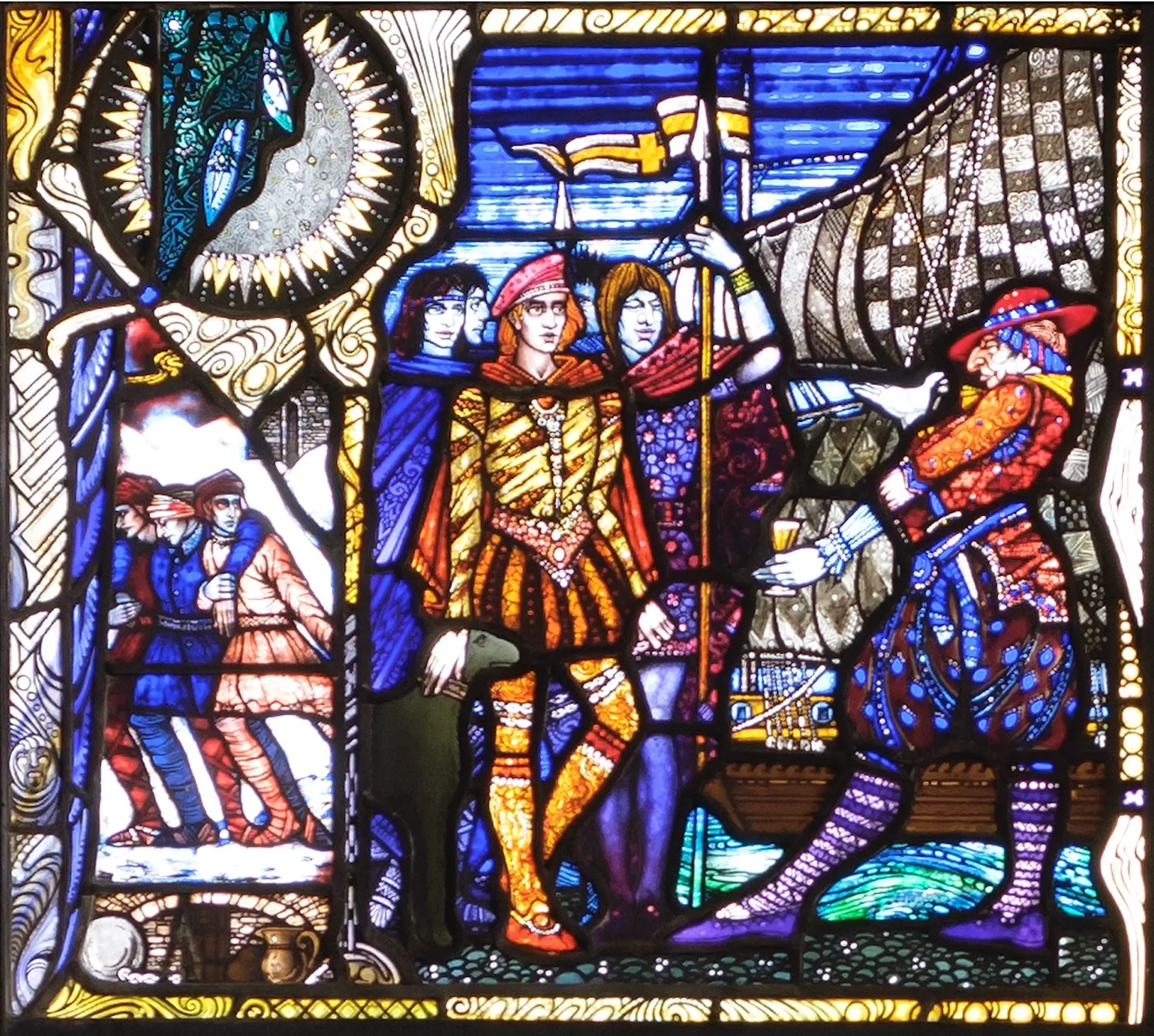
Hugh Roe O'Donnell, Rose's first husband

To prevent the impending alliance of the two powerful Ulster clans, Hugh Roe O'Donnell was kidnapped on the orders of Lord Deputy John Perrot in September 1587. O'Donnell eventually escaped with the help of Tyrone's bribery and returned to Tyrconnell in February 1592. In December, the Earl's seneschal O'Hagan and brehon William McCrodan escorted Rose to O'Donnell's house in Tyrconnell for the marriage ceremony. The couple were formally married around Christmas 1592 at O'Donnell's house. Donnelly suggests that O'Donnell was not eager to marry Rose, as it took ten months after his return to actually marry her. Tyrone may have pressured O'Donnell into sealing the marriage alliance. According to McGettigan, the marriage started out as a success with Rose having some measure of influence over O'Donnell.

In a poem addressed to O'Donnell, the bardic poet Maolmuire mac Con Uladh Mic an Bhaird appealed to Rose, stating:

Original Irish	English translation
Congnamh Róisi n'ior mhaith mé bíodh sí mar dhlighthear dhise 'na táir fá mh'égnach oraibh, a chédbhrath cláir Chonchobhair.	I have not renounced help from Rose. Let her be as befits her, a support for my complaint against you, o prime hope of Conchubhar’s plain.

However, by 1595 the couple were facing difficulties as Rose had not borne O'Donnell children. That year, with her father's consent, Rose and O'Donnell separated. In order to increase his influence in southern Connacht, O'Donnell had hopes of a marriage alliance with Lady Margaret Burke, daughter of the Ulick Burke, 3rd Earl of Clanricarde, who had refused to join the war. However the government became aware of O'Donnell's plan to reportedly "rob [Margaret] from her parents by surprise or force", and in December, she was placed in protective custody. Additionally, Clanricarde stated that he would "rather see [Margaret's] burial than her marriage to [O'Donnell] were he a good subject". Tyrone sent his trusted secretary Henry Hovenden to Tyrconnell to advise O'Donnell, and O'Donnell eventually took Rose back. Hiram Morgan believes that O'Donnell's choice to remain in a barren marriage is symbolic of his dependence on Tyrone.

The Calendar of State Papers makes reference to "some breach between Tirone and O Donnell about Tirone's daughter" on 2 April 1596. The following year, there was a rumour that Rose was to marry the Earl of Argyll. Two weeks later, on 6 April 1597, it was reported that O'Donnell had recently renewed his alliance with Tyrone, and that "their league of friendship is more apparently confirmed, for the satisfying of their followers and dependants, by O'Donnell's receiving of the earl's base daughter" in marriage. The phrase "base" could imply Rose's illegitimacy. By 1598, it was reported O'Donnell had divorced Rose. The divorce was most likely against Tyrone's wishes. Her marriage to O'Donnell did not result in any children. According to The Description of Ireland (1598), the separation was due to Rose's "barrenness". Donnelly considers this explanation suspicious—as O'Cahan would not have married such a "stigmatised" woman, and O'Donnell did not immediately remarry to secure an heir—and suggests that the separation occurred for another, private reason.

=== Donnell Ballagh O'Cahan ===
Donnell Ballagh O'Cahan, Tyrone's principal vassal, succeeded to the O'Cahan chieftainship in April 1598. To reaffirm their alliance, O'Cahan married Rose shortly after his succession. (Note: The historian Terry Clavin states that their marriage was in 1599. The historians Matthew McGinty and Morwenna Donnelly put it around 1598.) This required O'Cahan to leave his wife Mary (Hugh Roe O'Donnell's sister), who he had been married to since about June 1593.

The Irish confederacy was severely weakened following a harsh defeat at the Siege of Kinsale. Subsequently English forces destroyed crops and livestock across Ulster, particularly in O'Cahan's lands, leading to near-famine conditions. With defeat inevitable, O'Cahan offered his submission in June 1602. Tyrone demanded that O'Cahan meet with him. O'Cahan was possibly fearful of maintaining an association with Tyrone, and thus Rose was sent to meet her father on behalf of her husband. O'Cahan officially surrendered and withdrew from Tyrone on 27 July 1602. A condition of the surrender was that he would retain his land as an independent chieftain. O'Cahan's surrender drastically weakened Tyrone's power and created animosity between the two men.

Following the end of the Nine Years' War, a land rights dispute emerged between Tyrone and O'Cahan. The government sided with O'Cahan and provided funds for his lawsuit, intentionally using his hostility towards Tyrone to orchestrate the latter's undoing. Rose's marriage was also utilised to separate Tyrone and O'Cahan. It seems O'Cahan was never legally divorced from Mary which created enmity between him and Tyrone. George Montgomery, the new Protestant Bishop of Derry, encouraged O'Cahan to leave Rose and return to his first wife, writing to Lord Deputy Arthur Chichester on 4 March 1607: "the breach between [O'Cahan] and his landlord [the Earl of Tyrone] will be the greater by means of [the Earl's] daughter, his reputed wife, whom he has resolved to leave, having a former wife lawfully married to him."

O'Cahan repudiated his marriage to Rose in March 1607 and remarried to another woman. Tyrone had asked for her dowry back in the event of a divorce, but O'Cahan retained it. It is possible that the couple had children, as after O'Cahan was arrested in 1608, Chichester suggested placing O'Cahan's eldest son with the Provost of Trinity College. Sources do not mention Rose after 1607, and there are no references connecting her with the Flight of the Earls.

There is a report of Tyrone's daughter—"very beautiful... marriageable and greatly admired"—with him in Rome in 1615. It is not clear whether this woman participated in the Flight or travelled to the Continent at a different time. Aodh mac Aingil wrote a poem ascribed to Tyrone's late son Hugh O'Neill, 4th Baron Dungannon, which is addressed to a Brigid O'Neill. Paul Walsh stated it was "extremely probable" that Brigid was the same "greatly admired" daughter. Micheline Kerney Walsh agreed with this, and presumes Brigid was on the Flight. John McCavitt notes that, as the fate of Rose is unknown, it is possible she was the "greatly admired" daughter.

== In poetry ==
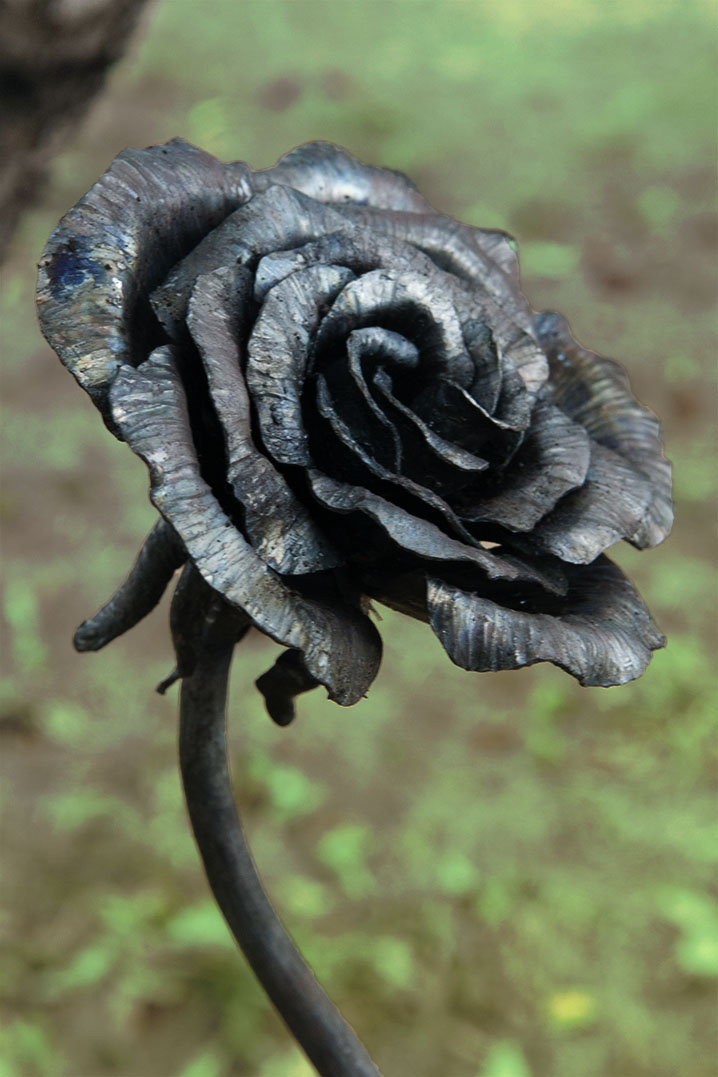
Her name, as commonly used in poetry, translates to "Dark Rose".

According to G. F. Dalton, Rose O'Neill's "misfortunes and her high birth attracted the attention of ballad-makers" who saw her as a symbol for collapsing Gaelic Irish society. She is typically called Róisín Dubh (Dark Rose) in poetry, on account of her dark hair.

James Clarence Mangan's Irish language and Sean-nós song "Róisín Dubh", (Note: Also known as Dark Rosaleen, My Dark Rosaleen or The Black-Haired Little Rose.) one of the most popular Irish rebel songs ever written, is based on a fragmentation of an older existing love song to Rose. It is addressed in Hugh Roe's voice to Rose, and is believed to have its origins in the rebel encampments during the Nine Years' War. One source attributes it to a Tyrconnellian poet under the reign of Red Hugh. Music scholar Donal O'Sullivan believes there is no evidence to suggest the original song was composed in the Elizabethan era.

Although "Róisín Dubh" is superficially a love song, it has been described as a patriotic poem that hides its nationalism via allegory. In a time when nationalistic expression was outlawed in Ireland, the poem was a way to covertly express nationalistic beliefs. Hugh Roe's love for Rose is symbolic for his love for Ireland, and his resolve to raise Ireland again to the position she held before the Norman conquest. In this way, Rose O'Neill has become a nationalist symbol for Gaelic Ireland.

Rose O'Neill has also been alluded to by English poets. She is referenced in Edmund Spenser's poem The Faerie Queene. Sir Aubrey de Vere wrote two poems about her: "Little Black Rose" and "Róisín Dubh or the Bleeding Heart".
