= Eoin O'Gallagher =

Irish royal advisor

Sir Eoin McToole O'Gallagher (died 1595) was a Gaelic Irish political advisor during the Elizabethan era. He was head of the O'Gallagher family and the chief advisor to the O'Donnell dynasty who ruled Tyrconnell. He was the son of Tuathal Balbh O'Gallagher (a previous renowned chief of his name). He came to prominence during the rule of Sir Hugh O'Donnell. His good relationship with the Crown is shown by his being awarded an annual pension in 1574 and a knighthood in 1581.

He married Siobhán Maguire, the widow of Matthew O'Neill, 1st Baron Dungannon who had been assassinated in 1558, and therefore became stepfather to Hugh O'Neill, Earl of Tyrone and his brothers Cormac and Art.

In 1574, O'Gallagher was described as Sir Hugh O'Donnell's "trusty counselor" in the State Papers. During the long O'Donnell succession dispute in the 1580s and 1590s, O'Gallagher backed Hugh Roe O'Donnell, who eventually triumphed and was acknowledged by the Crown.

O'Gallagher was in favour with the English administration and received a knighthood. He was attached to Iníon Dubh in an alliance.

In 1588, O'Gallagher went to Lord Deputy William FitzWilliam on a promise of safe conduct, but he was imprisoned instead. He was imprisoned with Lord of Inishowen Sean O'Doherty because FitzWilliam believed that they possessed treasure taken from the Spanish Armada. His wife Siobhán and his stepson Hugh lobbied for his release, but he remained captive until 1594. O'Gallagher died shortly after his release from Dublin Castle in 1595. Another source states that he died during his imprisonment.
