= Limavady Castle =

Ruined castle in County Londonderry, Northern Ireland

Coordinates: 55.024437°N 6.938100°W

Limavady Castle (Léim an Mhadaidh), also known as O'Cahans Castle, is a ruined castle in County Londonderry, Northern Ireland. It was once a stronghold of the O'Cahans.

In 1542, the MacQuillans, accompanied by James Butler, 9th Earl of Ormond, the Lord High Treasurer of Ireland and a large body of English, besieged and took the castle, slaughtering the whole garrison.
