= Giles Hovenden =

16th-century Anglo-Irish soldier

Captain Giles Hovenden (Note: Alternate spellings of his surname are Ovington, Ovenden and Hovendon.) was an Anglo-Irish light horseman who served in Ireland c. 1532. Hovenden had come to Ireland from the Parish of Ulcomb in Kent, England. He was head of the Hovenden family and for his military service received estates in Queen's County. He also developed business contacts with leading Irish figures such as Conn O'Neill. He exercised guardianship over Hugh O'Neill, the second son of the assassinated Matthew O'Neill, 1st Baron Dungannon. Hugh eventually rose to become the Earl of Tyrone, the most powerful Gaelic lord in Ireland, best remembered for leading Tyrone's Rebellion and the later Flight of the Earls. Tyrone remained close to the Hovendens, employing three of Giles' sons as officers in the forces that the Crown allowed him to maintain.

Giles Ovington (Hovenden) of Levidstown and later Tankardstown Castle.

The leasehold of the old Cistercian monastery and its estates were also granted to Giles Hovenden, in June 1551 by King Edward VI. He was Midleton's ‘missing Tudor-era landlord’. What is interesting is that this grant of the leasehold to Giles Hovenden is simply unknown in Midleton. The reason is that this fiant was misfiled during the reign of Elizabeth I. Giles counted as being "New English" in contrast to the two traditional groups of inhabitants the Gaelic Irish and the Old English. However, unlike the majority of his fellow incomers Hovenden was a Roman Catholic rather than a Protestant. This tradition carried on through the family, and led to some of his descendants fighting for the Catholic Irish Confederates and James II's Irish Army during the seventeenth century.

Giles Hovenden married Elizabeth Cheevers, daughter of Sir Walter Cheevers and they had five sons: John, Piers or Peter, Richard, Walter (named after his mothers father Sir Walter), d. 1597, and Henry. Richard and Henry served as captains of O'Neill's horse and foot soldiers no later than 1583. Henry served as Hugh O'Neill's most important secretary and adviser, and left Ireland with the Flight of the Earls in 1607.

On 29 November 1549, Captain Giles obtained the Lordship of Kilieban (Killaban) in Queens County. He married Elizabeth, daughter of Sir Walter Cheevers and left a daughter, Johanna, who married Captain John Barrington of Cullenagh Castle, Maryborough, Queens County, and five sons.

As early as the twelfth century the name of Hoveden is found in the person of Roger de Hovenden, of Hovenden in England, who held a place in the court of King Henry II, was Professor of Theology in Oxford and author of "Gesta Henrici Secundi" (1170 - 1192) (Ed. W. Stubbs, 1867), "Gesta Ricardi" and "Chronica" (1201 - Ed. W. Stubbs, 1868 -1871). In 1291, King Edward I caused diligent search to be made in all the libraries in England for this celebrated historian's Chronicle to adjust the dispute about the homage due from the Scottish crown.

John de Hoveden, a man of great repute in his time in the County of York, represented York City in five Parliaments. It is asserted by some that the name of Hoveden was derived from a town in the County of York, anciently called Hoveden, now known as Howden, twenty miles from the city of York, on the road from Beverley to Doncaster. Certain it is that the celebrated historian Roger de Hoveden was born in this place and one of the earliest Prebendaries here was the Reverend John de Hoveden. The town of Hoveden was in existence prior to the reign of Edward the Confessor.

== Bibliography ==
=== Sources ===
- Morgan, Hiram (1993). Tyrone's Rebellion: The outbreak of the Nine Years' War in Tudor Ireland. London: The Boydell Press. ISBN 0-86193-224-2.
- Marshall, John J. (1907). "The Hovendens: Foster Brothers of Aodh O'Neill, Prince of Ulster (Earl of Tireoghan)". Ulster Journal of Archaeology. 13 (1): 4–21. ISSN 0082-7355.
