= Conn O'Neill (died 1601) =

Irish soldier (died 1601)

- Other names: Conn Mac An Iarla
- Born: Between 1569–1574; Likely Ulster, Ireland
- Died: December 1601; Tír Eoghain, Ulster, Ireland
- Noble family: O'Neill dynasty
- Issue: Feardorcha O'Neill (fl. 1607)
- Father: Hugh O'Neill, Earl of Tyrone
- Mother: Daughter of Brian McPhelim O'Neill

Conn O'Neill (c. 1572–1601), known as Conn Mac An Iarla ("son of the Earl"), was a Gaelic Irish soldier of noble ancestry. The eldest son of Irish lord Hugh O'Neill, Earl of Tyrone, he fought for his father in the Nine Years' War. He was considered illegitimate by English society because his parents' marriage was annulled, thus he has been called Tyrone's "base son" or "bastard".

== Family background ==
Conn was the oldest son of Gaelic Irish lord Hugh O'Neill (Earl of Tyrone, 1585–1614), and his first wife, who was a daughter of Brian McPhelim O'Neill of Clandeboye. Conn's mother was possibly named Katherine or Feodora. He had at least one full-sister, who married Sir Ross McMahon around 1579. Tyrone also had another daughter, possibly a full-sibling of Conn, named Rose. (Note: See her Parentage)

When his grandfather Brian was incriminated in a violent conflict with English colonists, his father Tyrone withdrew any association with Brian by annulling the marriage on grounds of consanguinity. The case was judged in Tyrone's favour by the Archbishop, Official and Registrar of Armagh. The children of this marriage were therefore shut out from Tyrone’s noble lineage, and Conn was considered illegitimate by English society. The eldest son of Tyrone's subsequent marriage, Hugh (c. 1585–1609), was considered his heir.

The Royal Society of Antiquaries of Ireland suggests Conn's birthdate was c. 1577, however by this time his father Tyrone had already remarried to his second wife Siobhán O'Donnell. Conn's birthdate was prior to his father's annulment, meaning he was born sometime between 1569 and 1574.

== Career ==
After the execution of Gaelic lord Hugh Roe MacMahon in late 1590, MacMahon's lands in County Monaghan were divided and granted to English servitors. Tyrone, who had owned part of those lands under brehon law, was financially affected. In July 1592, Tyrone sent Conn on a raid into Trough, County Monaghan, to destabilise the reform settlement. As a result of the raid, court sessions were adjourned. Conn later travelled to Dundalk where he gave a facile account of the event to Lord Deputy William FitzWilliam.

Conn served his father throughout the Nine Years' War. In 1593, Tyrone was charged with sending Conn and Cormac MacBaron O'Neill into Fermanagh to assist the rebel Hugh Maguire. Tyrone claimed that they had travelled into Fermanagh simply to investigate the turmoil there.

When Conn and Henry Oge failed in an attack on Crown forces, Tyrone angrily stated that Conn was not fit to be called his son.

When Tyrone went into open rebellion in early 1595, Conn was one of his most "efficient" captains. That year Conn took possession of Fort Monaghan. In December 1595, Conn accompanied confederates Hugh Roe O'Donnell and Cormac MacBaron on a raid into Connacht. O'Donnell launched various raids into Connacht this year to expand his territory. Cormac MacBaron and Conn were with O'Donnell to represent Tyrone.

In late February 1596, a supply convoy (78 garrons with rations and munitions) headed to a garrison in Armagh was waylaid by Conn and taken to Marlacoo, one of his father's main storehouses.

In 1599, Conn commanded 300 men. He organised a riverside conference with the English on 7 September 1599. He was wounded near Kilmallock in 1600. In 1601, he was at the head of 20 cavaliers and 100 foot soldiers. On 9 December, it was reported that "Con, Tyrone's base son, is lately dead in [Tír Eoghain]".

== Legacy ==
Conn's son, Feardorcha, took part in the Flight of the Earls, leaving Ireland for mainland Europe.

Historian Paul Walsh described Conn as a "capable soldier".
