= Siobhán Maguire =

Gaelic Irish noblewoman (died 1600)

- Baroness Dungannon
- Died: 1600; Ireland
- Buried: Donegal Abbey
- Spouses: Matthew O'Neill, 1st Baron Dungannon (died 1558); Henry O'Neill (died); Eoin O'Gallagher (died 1595)
- Father: Cúconnacht Maguire

Siobhán Maguire, Baroness Dungannon (also anglicised Joan Maguire; died 1600) was a Gaelic Irish noblewoman, perhaps best known as the biological mother of Hugh O'Neill, Earl of Tyrone.

She held a prominent political role, and was considered "head and counsel of advice to the gentlemen and chiefs of Ulster".

== Biography ==
Her father was Cúconnacht Maguire, Lord of Fermanagh. On 8 October 1537, Cúconnacht was murdered on the island of Craghan in Lough Erne.

Siobhán was married three times. Her first husband was Feardorcha "Matthew" O'Neill, 1st Baron Dungannon. Their children included Brian and Hugh. Matthew also had two sons named Cormac and Art. Historian John O'Hart referred to Cormac and Art as illegitimate (i.e. not Siobhán's children). Conversely, historian Emmett O'Byrne stated that all four of Matthew's sons were legitimate.

Matthew became involved in a succession dispute with his half-brother Shane. Matthew was killed in 1558 by Shane's foster family, placing heirs Brian and Hugh in a dangerous situation. At some point between May and August 1558, English statesman Sir Henry Sidney organised the retrieval of the two boys, and they briefly stayed at his Dublin residence before being fostered by the English Hovenden family. Brian and Hugh were raised by Giles Hovenden and his second wife Joan Walshe. Brian was assassinated on Shane's orders in 1562. Hugh returned to Ulster in 1568, a year after Shane's death.

Siobhán remarried to Henry O'Neill of the Fews, son of Feidhlimidh Ruadh. Their son, Turlogh MacHenry O'Neill, died on 24 February 1639/1640. Henry was probably dead in 1572.

Her third husband was Eoin McToole O'Gallagher, chief advisor to the O'Donnell clan of Tyrconnell. O'Gallagher was a major adherent to tanist Hugh Roe O'Donnell during the 1580–1592 Tyrconnell succession dispute. In 1588 O'Gallagher went to Lord Deputy William FitzWilliam on a promise of safe conduct, but he was imprisoned instead. The covetous FitzWilliam believed that O'Gallagher possessed treasure taken from the Spanish Armada. O'Gallagher's imprisonment also had political motivations due to his support of Hugh Roe—the government sought to stop Hugh Roe from gaining power. Siobhán and her son Hugh lobbied for O'Gallagher's release, but O'Gallagher remained captive until 1594. O'Gallagher died shortly after his release from Dublin Castle in 1595.

Siobhán was involved in the Nine Years' War. Her son Hugh was the leader of the Irish confederacy during the war. She present at a dinner at Lifford in May 1595, which was in the honour of Spanish captain Alonso Cobos, who had recently arrived to assess the situation in Ireland and prepare the confederates for upcoming Spanish reinforcements.

Siobhán died in 1600. She was buried in Donegal Abbey, where her father had been interred in 1537.
