= Hugh O'Neill, 4th Baron Dungannon =

Irish nobleman (c. 1585 – 1609)

Baron Dungannon
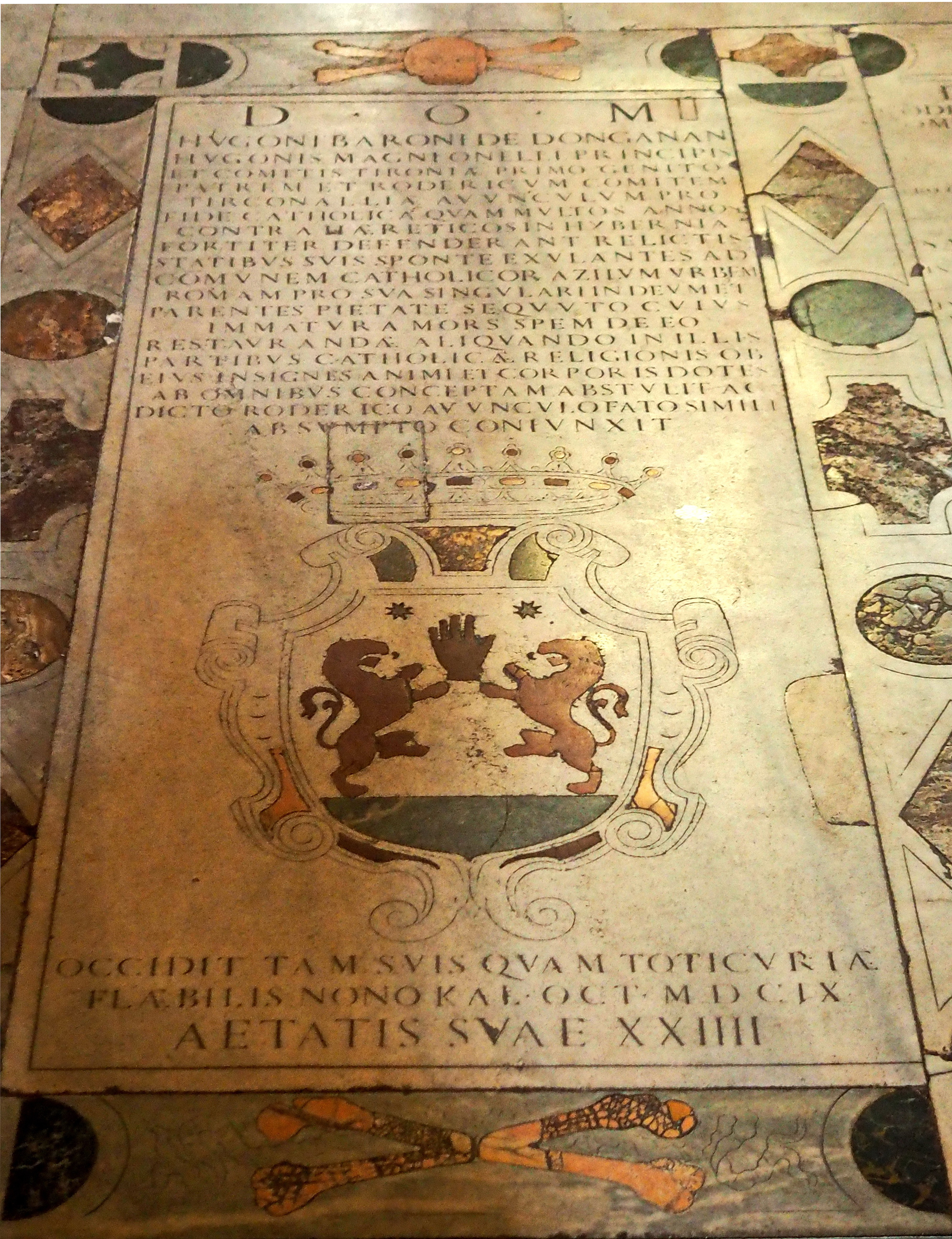
- Baron Dungannon's tomb in San Pietro in Montorio

4th Baron Dungannon
- Tenure: 1587–1609
- Predecessor: Hugh O'Neill, 3rd Baron Dungannon
- Successor: Henry O'Neill, 5th Baron Dungannon
- Born: c. 1585; Ulster, Ireland
- Died: c. 23 September 1609 (aged 24); Rome, Papal States
- Buried: San Pietro in Montorio, Rome
- Father: Hugh O'Neill, Earl of Tyrone
- Mother: Siobhán O'Donnell

Hugh O'Neill, 4th Baron Dungannon (c. 1585 – c. 23 September 1609) was an Irish nobleman. The eldest son of Hugh O'Neill, Earl of Tyrone, and Siobhán O'Donnell, he was heir to the O'Neill clan, though he predeceased his father.

Dungannon accompanied his family and countrymen on the Flight of the Earls, leaving Ireland for mainland Europe. A few months after settling in Rome, Dungannon became violently ill after catching fever during a holiday to Ostia. A year later he died in Rome aged 24. He is buried alongside his father and two half-uncles (Rory O'Donnell and Cathbarr O'Donnell) in San Pietro in Montorio.

== Early life ==
Hugh O'Neill was born c. 1585, specifically before December 1585. His father was Irish lord Hugh O'Neill, Earl of Tyrone, leader of the Irish confederacy during the Nine Years' War. His mother was Tyrone's second wife, Siobhán O'Donnell, who was a daughter of O'Donnell clan chief Hugh McManus O'Donnell.

Hugh had had several older sisters, Sarah, Mary, and Alice, and a younger brother, Henry. Hugh also had an older paternal half-brother, Conn, who was considered illegitimate by English society as his parents' marriage was annulled. As the eldest son of Tyrone's second wife, Hugh was considered the heir to his father's titles and estates.

Hugh became 4th Baron Dungannon after his father was named the Earl of Tyrone on 20 May [O.S. 10 May] 1587. His mother Siobhán died shortly before 10 February [O.S. 31 January] 1591. According to Tyrone's letters, the young Baron Dungannon was in fosterage in August 1594. In 1599, Sir John Harrington described brothers Hugh and Henry as "of good cheerful aspect, freckled, not tall, but strong, well-set, and acquainted with the English tongue". Following the Irish confederacy's surrender in 1603, he received a new patent which elevated him to the baronage of Dungannon.

== Flight of the Earls ==
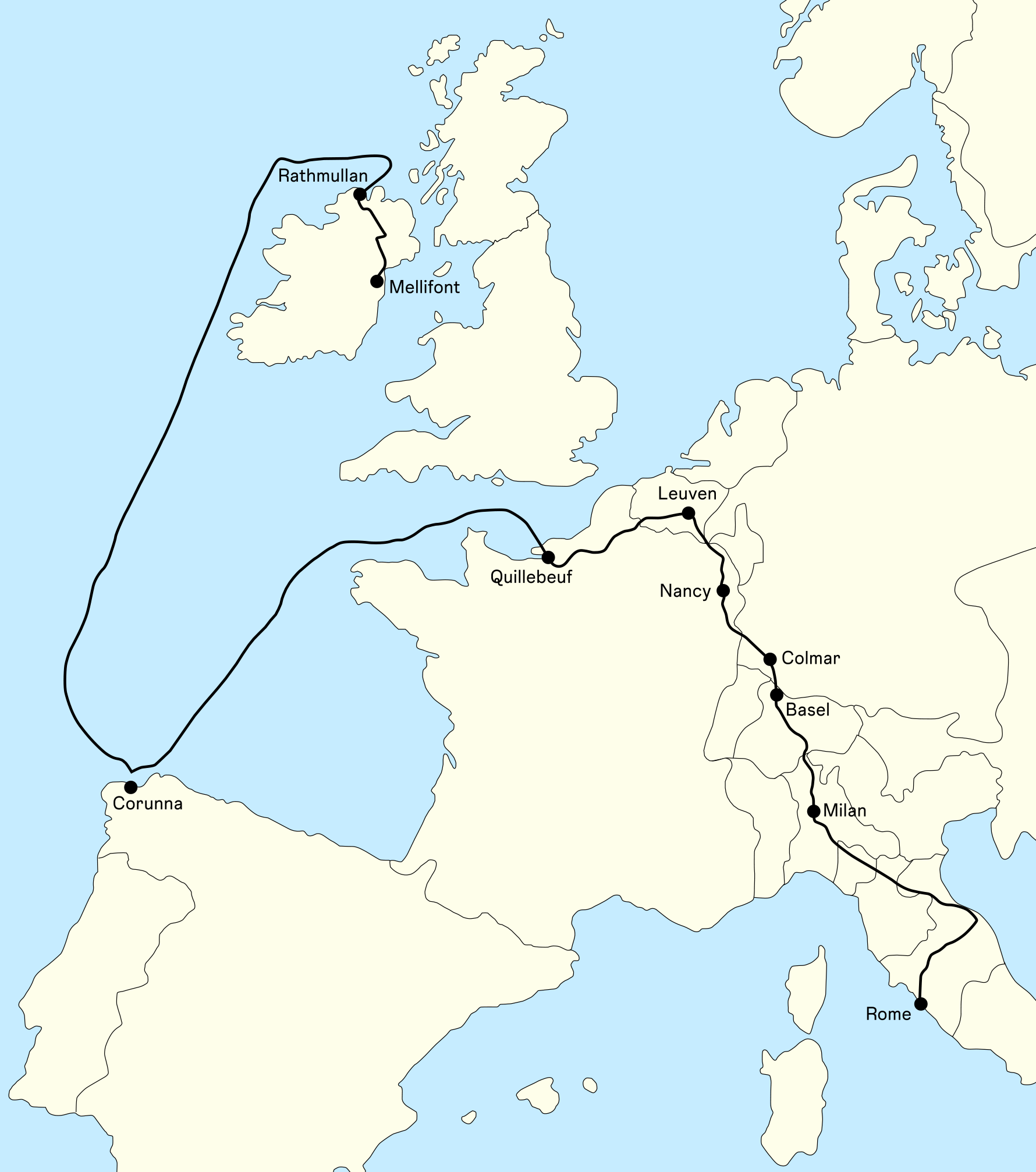
Dungannon's journey from Ireland to Rome

By September 1607, Dungannon was to be married to a daughter of Scottish nobleman Archibald Campbell, 7th Earl of Argyll. The marriage was organised by Randal McDonnell, Dungannon's brother-in-law, and was considered "the talk of Ulster". However, Tyrone's snap decision to flee Ireland put an end to these plans. With the ex-confederates potentially facing arrest for treason, Dungannon accompanied his father on the Flight of the Earls in 1607. The Irish nobles settled in Rome, where they were provided with a paltry pension.

== Illness and death ==
The nobles proved to be unhappy with the Italian climate and their poor accommodation. In early July 1608, Dungannon travelled to Ostia, a coastal town fifteen miles west of Rome, for a holiday and change of air. He was accompanied by fellow nobles Rory O'Donnell, 1st Earl of Tyrconnell and Cathbarr O'Donnell, and clergyman Donal O'Carroll. Unfortunately, the men "all agreed that that particular place [was] one of the worst and most unhealthy for climate in all Italy". Ostia's marshlands were ridden with mosquitoes, and after four days the young nobles became violently ill with fevers. Tyrconnell had caught the fever on 18 July, and Dungannon caught it on the following Monday.

Dungannon was ill for a year. He was moved from the Borgo, on the Tiber's west bank, to the Palazzo Montecitorio, with the hope that the higher altitude and distance from the river could cure his fever. He recovered to some extent, but he ultimately died in Rome in September 1609, (Note: According to the inscription on Dungannon's tomb, he was "joined in death here with Rory the aforementioned uncle, who was also taken by death in the same manner, to the inexpressible grief of his relatives and all the court on 24 September 1609..." According to a contemporary letter, Dungannon was buried on 24 September. Burke's Peerage and Cokayne stated he died on 23 September. The historian Paul Walsh also gave this death date before changing it to the 24th the following year.) aged 24 years old. (Note: The inscription on Dungannon's tomb stated he was 24 when he died.) He was unmarried. Tyrone could not afford to pay for the funeral, so the new Spanish ambassador in Rome, the Conde de Castro, funded the funeral with 400 crowns. On 24 September, Dungannon was buried in San Pietro in Montorio, the Roman church where Tyrconnell, Cathbarr, and eventually his father Tyrone were also buried.

D.O.M. To Hugh, Baron Dungannon Eldest son of the Prince, the Great Hugh O'Neill, Earl of Tyrone. For his remarkable loyalty to God and also to his parents he followed his father and Rory, the Earl of Tyrconnell, his uncle and leaving their estates they deliberately went into exile to the city of Rome, the usual safe refuge for Catholics on behalf of the Catholic faith which they had strongly defended for many years against the heretics of Ireland. His lamentable death dashed the hopes which all had placed in him for his exemplary talents and distinction of soul and body so propitious for a future favourable return to that country once again. He is joined in death here with Rory the aforementioned uncle, who was also taken by death in the same manner, to the inexpressible grief of his relatives and all the court on 24 September 1609 in his 24th year.

— English translation of the Latin inscription on Dungannon's tomb

After his death, the title of Baron Dungannon passed to his younger brother Henry, who was Tyrone's eldest surviving son. (Note: The title was ultimately attainted on 7 November [O.S. 28 October] 1614, at the same time that the title Earl of Tyrone was attainted.)

== Ancestry ==
Ancestors of Hugh O'Neill, 4th Baron Dungannon (Note: Hugh O'Neill's parents were Matthew "Feardorcha" O'Neill and Siobhán Maguire. Siobhán O'Donnell's parents were Hugh McManus O'Donnell and his first wife, Nuala O'Neill. Matthew O'Neill's parents were Conn Bacagh O'Neill and Alison Kelly. Siobhán Maguire's father was Cúconnacht Maguire. Hugh McManus O'Donnell's parents were Manus O'Donnell and Siobhán O'Neill. Nuala O'Neill's father was Shane O'Neill.)

8. Conn Bacagh O'Neill, 1st Earl of Tyrone
4. Matthew O'Neill, 1st Baron Dungannon
9. Alison Kelly
2. Hugh O'Neill, Earl of Tyrone
10. Cúconnacht Maguire, Lord of Fermanagh
5. Siobhán Maguire
1. Hugh O'Neill, 4th Baron Dungannon
12. Manus O'Donnell, Lord of Tyrconnell
4. Hugh McManus O'Donnell, Lord of Tyrconnell
13. Siobhán Ó Néill
3. Siobhán O'Donnell, Countess of Tyrone
8. Shane O'Neill
5. Nuala O'Neill

Hugh O'Neill, 4th Baron Dungannon
Peerage of Ireland
| Preceded by Hugh O'Neill | Baron Dungannon; 1587–1609 | Succeeded by Henry O'Neill |
