= Baron Dungannon =

Extinct Irish/English title of nobility

The title Baron of Dungannon in the Peerage of Ireland was associated with the first creation of the title of Earl of Tyrone.

== History ==
When Conn Bacach O'Neill, 1st Earl of Tyrone surrendered his Irish principality of Tír Eoghain to Henry VIII in 1542, as part of Henry's effort to make his new Kingdom of Ireland into all of Ireland, Henry created him, on 1 October 1542, a week later, Earl of Tyrone; by the patent this was to descend to his eldest, illegitimate, son, Ferdoragh O'Neill and his heirs; he assumed the more English name of Matthew. In the same patent he was created Baron of Dungannon, "to hold the dignity during the life of his father, with limitation to the heir apparent of the earldom," with extension to his heirs. This wording meant that the Barony was to behave like a courtesy title: the eldest son of each Earl of Tyrone was to be Baron of Dungannon until he succeeded to the Earldom, and also, as a substantive title, it did confer a seat in the Irish House of Lords.

Matthew was the first baron among the O'Neills; when he fathered an illegitimate son himself, it became known, for distinctiveness, as Art mac Baron. Unfortunately, all was not so smooth; there was considerable sentiment against the change of law and authority involved in the change to an Earldom, and when Shane O'Neill, known as "Shane the Proud", Conn's legitimate son, grew up, he led a rebellion from 1551 onward, against Conn and Matthew and Anglo-Irish law.

When Matthew was killed, at Shane's order, in 1558, his young legitimate son Brian O'Neill became Baron of Dungannon; when his grandfather, Conn Bacach, died the next year, in exile from Tyrone, Brian should have become Earl of Tyrone instead. But his claim to the Earldom was never acknowledged; instead, the Barony of Dungannon was treated as though it were not subject to any special condition, and Brian continued to be called Lord Dungannon; during these years, Queen Elizabeth's Government in Ireland was attempting to reach a settlement with Shane the Proud.

When Brian was assassinated in 1562 by Turlough Luineach O'Neill, tanist to Shane the Proud, "between Carlingford and the Newry," his younger brother Hugh continued to be treated as Baron Dungannon; when he grew up, he fought alongside the Queen's government against his uncle Shane and his cousin Turlough.

In 1585, Hugh O'Neill was seated in the Irish Parliament as Earl of Tyrone; in 1587, he received a regrant and confirmation of the Earldom, which also confirmed his son Hugh as Baron of Dungannon. This specificity was in part due to Earl Hugh's own marital complications; his first marriage, to his distant cousin, a daughter of Brian MacFelim O'Neill of Clandeboye, had been found invalid, and their children illegitimate; Hugh was the eldest son of his second wife, Joan O'Donnell, half-sister of the first Earl of Tyrconnell.

After an adventurous career, Earl Hugh, his family, and the O'Donnells left Ireland to seek Spanish aid in 1607, in the flight of the Earls; his son Hugh accompanied him, only to die in Rome in 1609. In 1608, King James I had attainted Hugh and his family, which deprived them of their lands and titles; the Irish Parliament confirmed this in 1614.

Earl Hugh and his relatives continued to use the title of Earl of Tyrone while in exile; few of them had legitimate sons to be heirs apparent. When Earl Hugh's last surviving son made his will in 1641, he called himself Earl of Tyrone and Prince of Ulster; he did not call himself or his (illegitimate) son Hugo Eugenio Baron Dungannon.

== Holders ==
The following men were called Baron of Dungannon:

- Matthew O'Neill, 1st Baron Dungannon, (bef. 1624 - 1558), cr. 1542.
- Brien O'Neill, Earl of Tyrone (- 1562), de jure Baron Dungannon 1558-9, styled Dungannon 1558-1562.
- Hugh O'Neill, Earl of Tyrone, styled Baron Dungannon 1562-1585, never de jure: before his brother's death, he was not heir apparent, for his brother could have married and had sons; after his brother's death, he was de jure Earl of Tyrone, but not Baron Dugannon by the limitation.
- Hugh O'Neill, Baron Dungannon, styled Baron Dungannon, 1587-1608, de jure from birth. Title forfeit 1608.

The title has also been extinct since the end of the male line of the grantee.

== See also ==
- Viscount Dungannon

== Sources ==
- Complete Peerage: "TYRONE": Vol. XII, part II, pp. 129–47; noted as CP; Appendix C to the same volume also deals with the claimants in exile to the Earldom.

== See also ==
Viscount Dungannon
Countess & Marchioness of Dungannon
