= Pedro Blanco (Spanish Armada) =

Spanish seaman and manservant

Pedro Blanco (fl. 1588–1616) was a Spanish seaman, footman and survivor of the Spanish Armada.

After his shipwreck in Ireland, he became a loyal aide to nobleman Hugh O'Neill and fought in the Nine Years' War. Blanco distinguished himself at various battles, and was also an interpreter and interlocutor between the Spanish and Irish. In 1607 he accompanied O'Neill in his flight to mainland Europe, though it is unclear whether he ever returned to Spain. By 1616, it appears he was living in Rome.

== Spanish Armada ==
The Spanish Armada was a naval fleet that sailed from Lisbon in May 1588. Philip II, King of Spain, intended to invade England and reinstate Catholicism in the country. Blanco, an ordinary seaman, (Note: McGurk described Blanco as a "celebrated Spanish officer".) served in the company of Captain Lope Vázquez on La Juliana, a merchant vessel (carrack) commandeered at Sicily on 15 December 1586.

=== Shipwreck ===
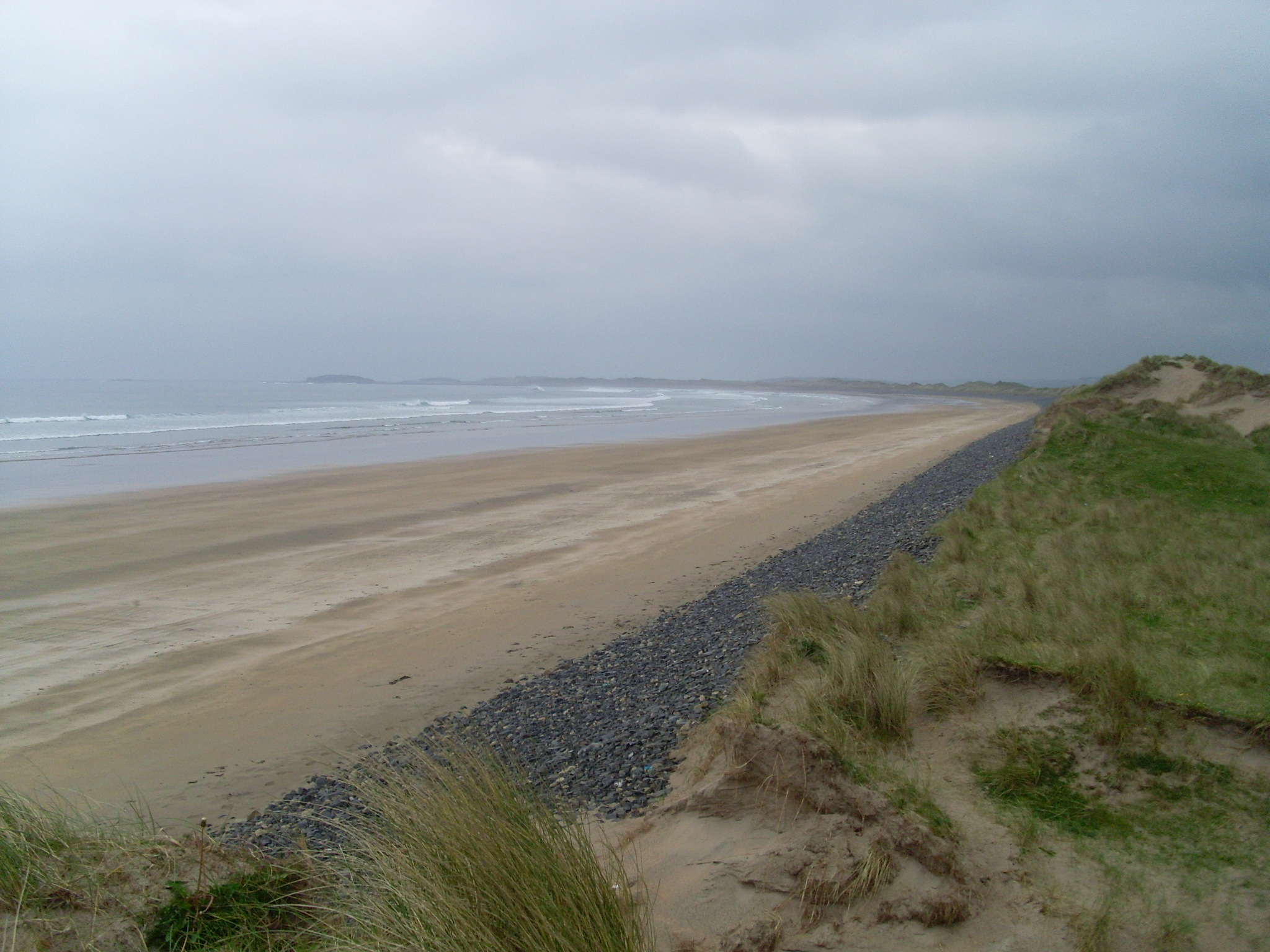
Streedagh Beach, County Sligo, where Blanco was shipwrecked

In late 1588, La Juliana became shipwrecked at Streedagh Strand, north of the Rosses Point Peninsula on the west coast of Ireland. The Lord Deputy of Ireland, English statesmen William FitzWilliam, ordered the execution of any Spanish survivors.

The mercenary forces of Hugh O'Neill, Earl of Tyrone, commanded by his foster-brothers Richard and Henry Hovenden, committed the largest single massacre of Armada survivors in Inishowen. On 14 September 1588, writing from Dungannon, Henry Hovenden reported to FitzWilliam that his troops "with 150 men attacked the Spaniards at Illagh, the O'Docartaig town, and the second day took them prisoners. Pray for a warrant for their victualing to Dublin. One of the prisoners has commanded over 30,000 men." FitzWilliam was suspicious of the Earl's activities, and refused to believe this news, but it is confirmed in the report of a Spanish escapee.

Historians John Marshall and Hiram Morgan characterised Tyrone as reluctantly ordering the massacre to keep in the English government's good graces. Contemporary sources seem to imply that the massacre was carried out on the actions of the O'Donnell clan, who counselled O'Neill's troops, though this is possibly misdirection by Tyrone. Government officials reported that Tyrone heavily reprimanded O'Donnell clan chief Hugh McManus O'Donnell for betraying the Spaniards and their refuge, and he contemptuously told O'Donnell to seek dwelling in another country.

=== Recruitment by O'Neill ===
O'Neill also assisted three officers and many sick commoners, including Blanco. He may have been playing a "double game". He kept on Blanco as his personal servant for at least the next nineteen years. It seems O'Neill never recruited Blanco or the other officers as soldiers. His decision may have been affected by the hostility the English had towards Lord Brian O'Rourke for recruiting many Spanish survivors into his military. O'Neill also helped nobleman Don Antonio Manrique escape.

Roughly half a dozen Spanish seamen, including Blanco, stayed behind in Ireland. Other Spaniards who remained in the British Isles include:

- Alonso de Carmona (Venecera veneciana)
- Francisco de Aguilar (company of Captain Beltrán del Salto, La Juliana)
- Bartolomé Rodríguez (company of Francisco de Toledo, La Lavia)
- Juaro de la Cruz (company of Captain Barate, La Lavia)
- Juan Pérez Cebadero (La Lavia)
- Antón Fernández (La Lavia)
- Juan de Montesinos (La Lavia)
- Francisco de Cuellar (La Lavia)

The turmoil created by the Armada's arrival on the Irish coast was a contributing factor of the Nine Years' War (1593–1603).

== In Ireland ==
In 1596, Captain Alonso de Cobos reported the presence in Ulster of eight Spanish survivors of the Armada. On 20 November, de Cobos arrived at the Spanish court with a petition from these men asking for financial help; one of the names mentioned was Pedro Blanco. De Cobos proposed that it would be more valuable for Blanco to remain in Ireland as a Spanish translator and emissary - King Philip II agreed.

The Spaniards, whom I mentioned to Your Majesty in another report as being in that kingdom since the loss of the Armada that went to England, wished to return with me this last summer when by order of Your Majesty I went to that kingdom. I refused to take them for I was sent on a special mission of help and it might have looked bad to the chiefs if I had taken away those Spaniards whom they had with them before. For this reason I told the soldiers that it was of better service to Your Majesty that they should remain where they were. This time they believed that I would bring them some pay or money and I told them that they had not asked me and therefore I had not mentioned it to Your Majesty. They wished to return with me and I did not allow them. I told them that Your Majesty had decided to send aid to that kingdom and would need them there to serve as interpreters, guides and spies, being so well acquainted with the language and the country; and so through my persuasion they remained and gave me a memorial for Your Majesty asking that you should give them help.

— Alonso de Cobos to Philip II

=== Nine Years' War ===
Blanco became a footman and trusted servant to the Earl of Tyrone. During the war, Blanco was a somewhat important figure as the Irish leaders sought assistance from Spain to fight England. In April 1600, O'Neill stimulated the Irish-Spanish alliance by sending his son Henry, then aged 13, to Spain. O'Neill wanted Blanco to accompany Henry, but King Philip III again refused as Blanco was of greater use in Ireland. In December 1601, the Irish alliance established contact with Juan del Águila, with various Spanish ensigns, including Blanco, acting as messengers. According to O'Neill, Blanco "distinguished himself" at the Battle of the Yellow Ford and the Siege of Kinsale.

By 1607, Blanco had somewhat assimilated into Irish life. He owned five cows, two calves, one heifer and two fowling pieces. He also had a wife and children living in Ireland. According to O'Neill, Blanco was "the last [Spaniard] remaining" in Ireland - the others either returned to Spain or were killed in war.

== Flight of the Earls ==
In 1607, Blanco was one of about ninety people who accompanied O'Neill in the Flight of the Earls, leaving Ireland to find better prospects in continental Europe. O'Neill had made a "snap decision" to leave Ireland; possibly because of this, Blanco left his wife and children behind.

They hoped to reach Spain, but their ship was driven by storms into port at Quilleboeuf, Normandy. Philip III did not permit the refugees to land in Spain, as he sought to maintain the recent 1604 peace treaty with England. The Spanish government was on the verge of bankruptcy after the Anglo-Spanish War and could not endure another war. The refugees continued to Leuven in the Spanish Netherlands, and eventually arrived in Rome.

From Rome, O'Neill wrote a document in favour of Blanco, signed 7 January 1616, received by Philip III on 17 February. O'Neill petitioned Philip to give Blanco employment, and implied that Blanco should be reunited with his wife and children.

I, the Count of Tyrone, certify that in the year 1588 Pedro Blanco and certain other Spaniards arrived in my lands having escaped from the great storm which caused the loss of many ships sent against England under the command of the Duke of Medina Sidonia. These Spaniards escaped from the enemy who beheaded any of them they found wandering and lost and so I, the Count of Tyrone, received all of those who reached my lands and kept them with me until some died fighting valiantly in my wars and others returned to Spain; the last one remaining was the said Pedro Blanco who served me with such loyalty that I wished to send him to Spain with my son Don Enrrico but the captains of the ships would not consent to take him for he was so useful in Ireland and they had orders from His Majesty, may he be with God, not to allow him to return for he was of greater service to His Majesty in Ireland than anywhere else. He particularly distinguished himself in the battle which my captains fought against Sir Henry Duke, general of the Queen of England, and they themselves made known to me the courage which Pedro Blanco displayed on that occasion. He also distinguished himself in another battle at which I was present and where we slew the general and the greater part of his army; there I myself saw Pedro Blanco fighting so valiantly that I never afterwards wanted to be parted from him. He also distinguished himself in another battle which I fought against the Viceroy when I broke the enemy’s army. When Don Juan del Aguila came to Ireland with three thousand soldiers and was besieged by the enemy Pedro Blanco showed particular courage. At that time there was no other but this great soldier whom I could trust nor who would dare to take my letters across the enemy lines. At night he passed with great difficulty over the enemy trenches and reached the town where the said Don Juan del Aguila was besieged, gave him my letters and brought back the replies with great care and loyalty. He distinguished himself by many other deeds which I do not mention for they are innumerable and I do not wish to tire Your Majesty but as they are worthy of reward I beg Your Majesty to order that Pedro Blanco be given some employment near my person for he merits any favour Your Majesty may grant him. He is now growing old and has his wife and children in Ireland without any means of removing them from the hands of the enemy. I therefore give him this certificate signed with my own hand and sealed with my seal and arms in Rome on the seventh of January 1616.

— Hugh O'Neill, Earl of Tyrone to Philip III

== See also ==
- Francisco de Cuellar
- Hugh O'Neill, Earl of Tyrone
- Spanish Armada
- Spanish Armada in Ireland
