= Spanish Armada in Ireland =

Landfall made upon the coast of Ireland in September 1588

The Spanish Armada in Ireland refers to the landfall made upon the coast of Ireland in September 1588 of a large portion of the 130-strong fleet sent by Philip II to invade England.

Following its defeat at the naval battle of Gravelines, the Armada had attempted to return home through the North Atlantic, when it was driven from its course by violent storms, toward the west coast of Ireland. The prospect of a Spanish landing alarmed the Dublin government of Queen Elizabeth I, which prescribed harsh measures for the Spanish invaders and any Irish who might assist them.

Up to 24 ships of the Armada were wrecked on a rocky coastline spanning 500 km, from Antrim in the north to Kerry in the south, and the threat to Crown authority was readily defeated. Many of the survivors of the multiple wrecks were put to death, and the remainder fled across the sea to Scotland. It is estimated that some 6,000 members of the fleet perished in Ireland or off its coasts.

== Background ==
The Spanish Armada was a fleet of 130 ships that sailed from A Coruña in August 1588 under the command of the Duke of Medina Sidonia with the purpose of escorting an army from Flanders to invade England. It met with armed resistance in the English Channel, when a fireship attack off Calais broke its formation, and was driven into the North Sea after the Battle of Gravelines.

When the fleet entered the North Sea, 110 ships remained under Medina Sidonia's command. Many were damaged by gunfire or were running low on supplies, making them unfit for service in the Atlantic Ocean. Some had cut their anchors in the flight from the fireships, which severely diminished their ability to navigate close to shore. Also, the Armada commanders made a large navigational error that brought the fleet too close to the dangerous Atlantic coasts of Scotland and Ireland.

== The course home ==
=== The plotted course ===
After Gravelines the commanders of the Armada held a conference on Sidonia's flagship. Some proposed a course for Norway, others for Ireland. The admiral made his choice, and orders were issued to the fleet:

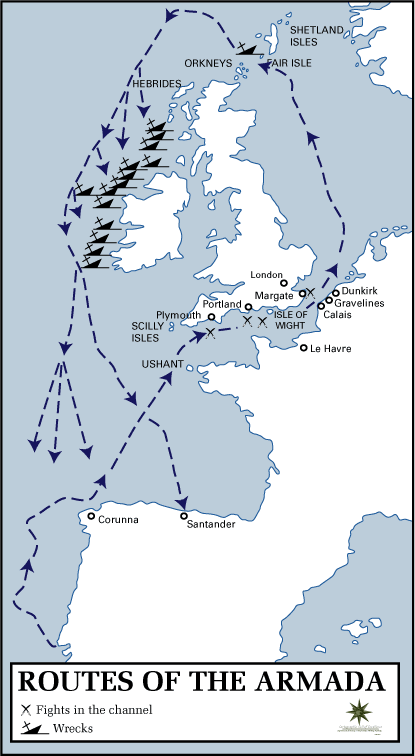
Route taken by the Spanish Armada

The course that is first to be held is to the north/north-east until you be found under 61 degrees and a half; and then to take great heed lest you fall upon the Island of Ireland for fear of the harm that may happen unto you upon that coast. Then, parting from those islands and doubling the Cape in 61 degrees and a half, you shall run west/south-west until you be found under 58 degrees; and from thence to the south-west to the height of 53 degrees; and then to the south/south-west, making to the Cape Finisterre, and so to procure your entrance into The Groyne A Coruña or to Ferrol, or to any other port of coast of Galicia.

The fleet was to approach the coast of Norway, before steering to the meridian of the Shetland Islands and on to Rockall. This allowed passage outside the northern tip of Shetland, clearing the coast of Scotland at a distance of 160 km. Once out in the broad Atlantic, the ships were to steer to a point 645 km beyond the Shannon estuary on the west coast of Ireland, giving themselves a clear run to northern Spain.

=== The course taken ===
The Armada's sailing orders were almost impossible to follow. The weather was difficult. Many of the ships and their crew members were in great distress. The navigators' charts were primitive, and their best training and experience in the techniques of dead reckoning and latitude sailing fell far short of what was needed to bring the fleet safely home.

The Armada failed to keep its course around the north of Shetland at 61 1/2°N. Instead, on 20 August, it passed safely to the south, between Orkney and Fair Isle, and was carried into the Atlantic at about 59 1/2°N. From there it was due to sail from North Uist in the Hebrides Islands until it caught sight of the distant islet of Rockall, but failed again. Southerly winds blew from 21 August to 3 September, stirred up by an anticyclone over Scandinavia, which prevented the fleet from running west-south-west as ordered. One report reflects the frustration of the navigators: "We sailed without knowing whither through constant fogs, storms and squalls".

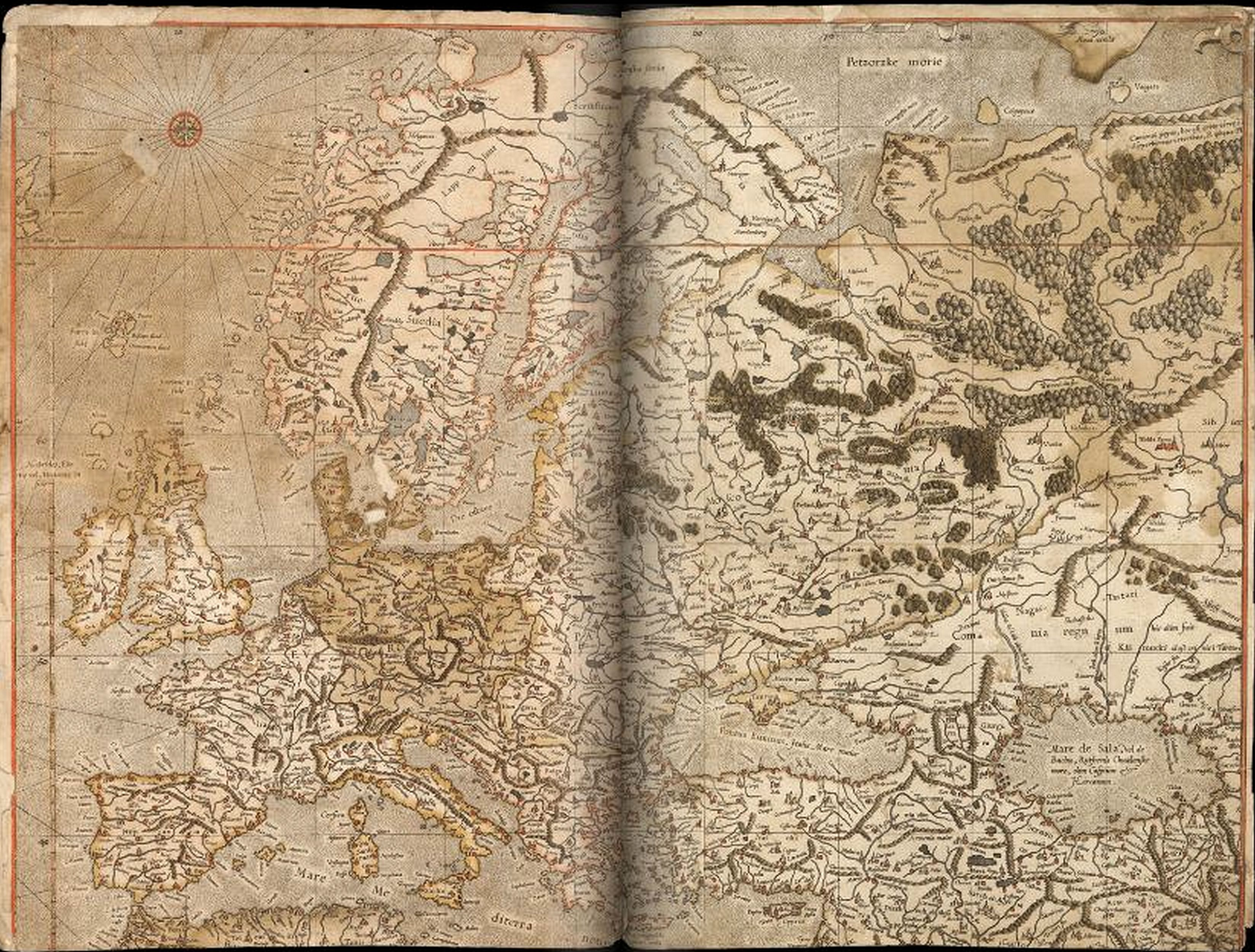
Mercator map of Europe: the west coast of Ireland on the extreme left.

The sailing orders were rendered useless by the weather, but the miscalculation of the Armada's position contributed greatly to its destruction. The navigators were unaware of the effect of the eastward flowing Gulf Stream, which must have hindered the fleet's progress – perhaps by as much as 30 km a day. The paymaster of the San Juan Bautista, Marcos de Aramburu, recorded a log of his progress from late August onwards, when the rest of the fleet was within sight. The inference from his observations is that his ship's estimated position as it turned for home was entirely wrong, some 480 km to the west: its real position lay in the east, perilously close to the coasts of Scotland and Ireland. This single deficiency "made the difference between safety and disaster".

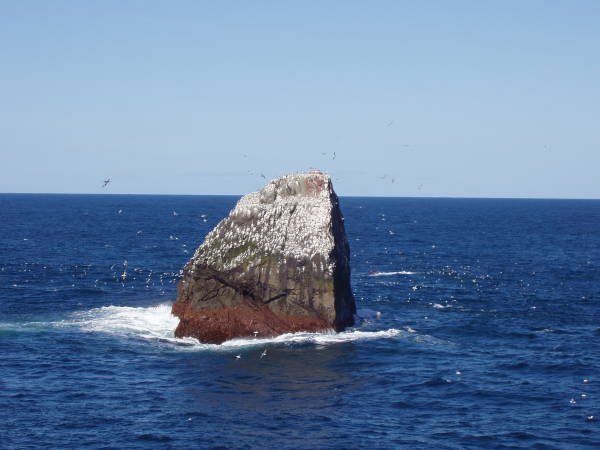
Rockall, a small, isolated rocky islet in the North Atlantic Ocean 301 kilometres (187 mi) west of Soay, St Kilda, about 430 kilometres (270 mi) north-west of Donegal.

After seven weeks at sea the opportunity to make landfall and take on supplies and effect repairs must have been welcome, but navigation in these waters demanded intimate knowledge. The experience of Spanish mariners in the intricacies of north Atlantic conditions was largely confined to trading voyages to the south and south-west of Ireland, and it is likely that the fleet's pilots preferred to maintain Sidonia's course, despite the hardships on board their ships.

Most of the fleet – 84 ships – avoided land, and most of those made it home, although in varying degrees of distress. The remainder were forced toward the coast of Ireland – perhaps 28 – and included several galleons and many merchantmen. The latter had been converted for battle and were leaking heavily, making sail with severely damaged masts and rigging, and with most of their anchors missing. The ships seem to have maintained contact until the beginning of September, when they were scattered by a south-west gale (described in the contemporary account of an Irish government official as one "the like whereof hath not been seen or heard for a long time"). Within days, this lost fleet had made landfall in Ireland.

=== Government preparations ===
The head of the English Crown administration at Dublin was Lord Deputy William Fitzwilliam. In August 1588 he was presented with credible intelligence that the battle in the English Channel had been won by the Spanish and that the invasion of England was set to be completed. Then it was understood that the Spanish were in the Atlantic and the entire fleet was about to fall on the coast of Ireland. The degree of alarm among the English at Dublin was extreme, and Fitzwilliam put out false reports that reinforcements from England were due to arrive with 10,000 troops.

The English feared the Spanish would land in disciplined formations, with the Irish rising out to join them from territories that were almost beyond the control of the government. But reliable intelligence was soon received at Waterford and Dublin that the ships were fetching up in a chaotic manner at disparate locations in the provinces of Ulster, Connacht and Munster, along a coastline spanning 300 miles (480 km). Fitzwilliam ordered that all Spaniards be captured and hanged summarily; and that anyone aiding them be tortured and charged as a traitor to the Crown.

== Landfall ==
=== Munster ===
The Armada first made landfall in the southern province of Munster, which had been colonised by the English in 1583 following the suppression of the last of the Desmond Rebellions. Fitzwilliam received orders from London to lead an expedition there, and intelligence from the governor of Connacht, Richard Bingham, soon confirmed that further landfalls were being made throughout the west and north of the country.

Thomond: Many ships were sighted off the coast of County Clare: four at Loop Head, two of which were wrecked, including San Esteban (700 tons, 264 men) at Doonbeg, and probably the heavily damaged San Marcos (790 tons, squadron of Portugal, 409 men, 33 guns) at Lurga Point (modern day Seafield, Quilty, County Clare) inside Mutton Island. All survivors were put to death by the sheriff of Clare, Boetius MacClancy (some, according to tradition, at Gallows Hill, but more likely at Cnoc na Crocaire, Spanish Point).

Seven ships anchored at Scattery Roads, probably with a pilot who knew the coast. Their landing party was fought off, but they did secure some supplies and managed to repair their ships. One galleon, Anunciada (703 tons, 24 guns, 275 men), was fired and scuttled off Kilrush on 12 September, and the crew transferred to Barco de Danzig, which made it safely to Spain after the squadron departed the Shannon estuary on 11 September.

Blasket Islands: One Armada commander, Juan Martínez de Recalde, did have experience of the Irish coast: in 1580 he had landed a Papal invasion force in the Dingle peninsula, in the run up to the Siege of Smerwick, and had managed to evade an English squadron of warships. In the Armada he had command of the galleon São João de Portugal (1,150 tons, 500 men, 50 guns) of the Biscayan squadron, which engaged with the English fleet in the Channel and held off Francis Drake in Revenge, John Hawkins in Victory, and Martin Frobisher in Triumph.

After the defeat at Gravelines Recalde's galleon led San Juan de Bautista (750 tons, 243 men) and another small vessel (almost certainly a Scottish fishing smack seized to assist with navigation and inshore work). As these ships approached the coast of Kerry, Recalde's lookouts sighted Mount Brandon on the Dingle peninsula and, to the west, the lofty Blasket Islands, a complex archipelago studded with reefs.

Recalde steered to the islands in search of shelter, riding on a swell through a tight gap at the eastern tip of the Great Blasket Island. His galleon made it through to calm water and dropped anchor over a sandy bottom beneath sheer cliffs. San Juan de Bautista and the smack soon followed. The anchorage ensured that the only wind that might drive the ships off would bring them clear to the open sea. It was a difficult manoeuvre, demanding prior knowledge of the coastline.

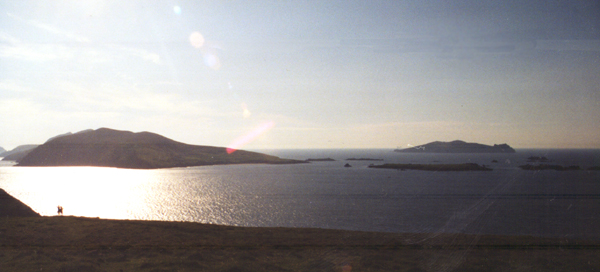
Recalde sailed through the gap between the tip of the Great Blasket and Carraig Fhada (right-of-centre) to enter the sound (foreground). Look-outs for the crown army would have shared this clifftop view from the Dingle peninsula.

Recalde's ships remained within their shelter for several days, and a crown force led by Thomas Norris (brother of the soldier, John Norris) and Edward Denny (husband of Lady Denny) arrived in Dingle to guard against a landing. Recalde sent a reconnaissance party ashore, but all eight members were captured. At one stage a westerly gale caused Portugal to collide with San Juan de Bautista, and when the wind died down another ship, Santa Maria de la Rosa (900 tons, 297 men: Guipuzcoa squadron), entered the sound from the north and fired off a gun by way of distress signal.

As the tide ebbed, Recalde's ships held their anchorage in the more sheltered part of the sound, while Santa Maria de la Rosa drifted and then simply sank — perhaps on striking Stromboli Rock — leaving one survivor for the English to interrogate. The survivor's information was that the captain of Santa Maria de la Rosa had called the pilot a traitor and run him through with a sword just as the ship began to sink; he also asserted that the Prince of Ascoli, son of the king of Spain, had gone down with the ship — this information was false, but proved useful propaganda for the English.

Two more ships entered the sound — San Juan de Ragusa (650 tons, 285 men), the other unidentified. San Juan de Ragusa was in distress and sank — perhaps on striking Dunbinna reef. San Juan de Bautista attempted to take advantage of an ebb tide and sail south out of the sound, but ended up tacking about on the flood tide to avoid the numerous reefs, before sailing through the north-west passage. After a difficult night, the crew were dismayed to find themselves at the mouth of the sound once more. But the wind blew from the south-east, and San Juan de Bautista finally escaped on 25 September and made it home to Spain through a terrible storm.

Three days later Recalde led the remaining ships out of the sound and brought them to Spain, where he instantly died. Those survivors who had fallen into Denny's custody were put to death at Dingle.

Fenit: The sloop Nuestra Senora del Socorro (75 tons) anchored at Fenit, in Tralee Bay on the coast of Kerry, where she was surrendered to crown officers. The 24 men on board were taken into custody and marched to Tralee Castle. On the orders of Lady Margaret Denny, they were all hanged from a gibbet.

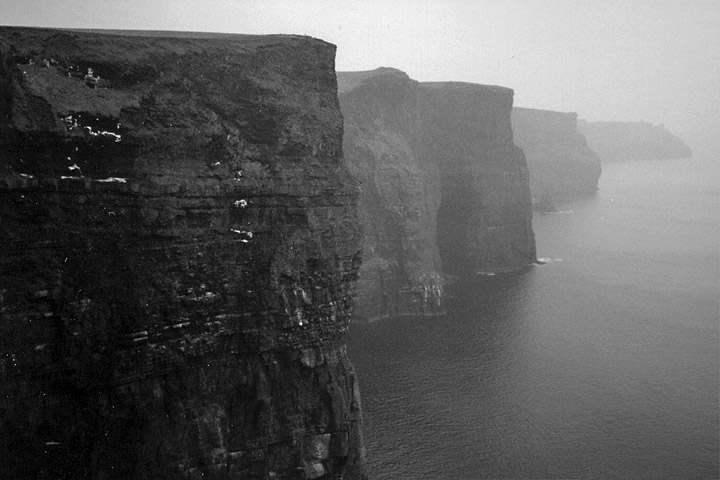
Cliffs of Moher, looking south towards Hag's Head.

Valentia Island: Trinidad (800 tons, 302 men) was wrecked on the coast of Desmond — probably at Valentia Island, off the coast of south Kerry — although there are no details of this event.

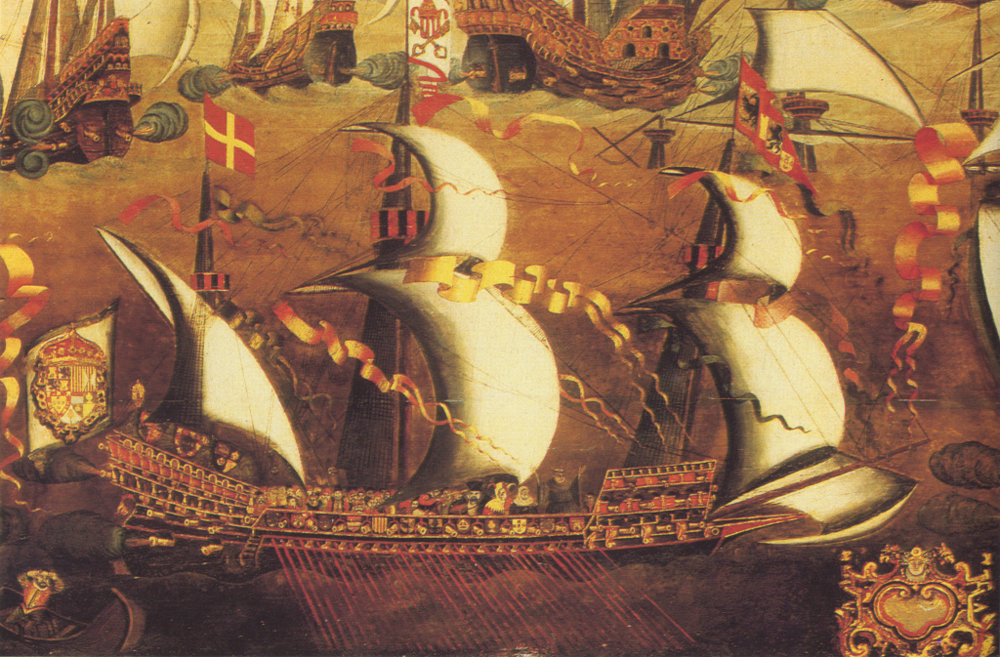
An Armada galeass, similar to Zuñiga, depicted in the anonymous Greenwich Cartoon.

At Liscannor the oar-powered galleass Zuñiga (290, Naples) anchored off-shore with a broken rudder, having found a gap in the Cliffs of Moher, which rise sheer from the sea over 220 metres. The ship came under surveillance by the sheriff of Clare and, when a cock-boat was sent ashore in search of supplies, the Spanish were attacked by crown forces and had to withdraw to their ship. One captive was taken and sent for interrogation. Zuñiga escaped the coast with favourable winds, put in at Le Havre, and finally made it back to Naples the following year.

=== Ulster ===
Donegal: La Trinidad Valencera (1,000 tons, Levant squadron, 360 men, 42 guns) had taken on more water than could be pumped out. Yet as she approached the coast she managed to rescue 264 men from the Barca de Amburgo, another ship swamped in the heavy seas. Trinidad anchored in Glenagivney Bay, where she listed to such a degree that the order was given to abandon ship. Some locals were paid for the use of a small boat, and over the course of two days all 560 men were ferried to shore. La Trinidad Valencera sank in Kinnagoe Bay, Inishowen.

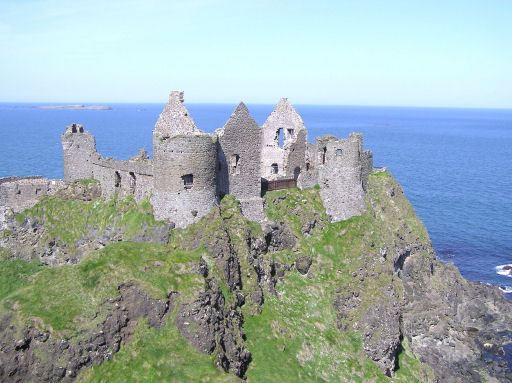
Dunluce Castle.

During a seven-day march inland, the column of survivors met a force of cavalry under the command of Richard Hovenden and Henry Hovenden, foster-brothers of Hugh O'Neill, Earl of Tyrone. Ultimately Tyrone's forces committed the largest single massacre of Armada survivors in Inishowen. Upon pledges of safe conduct for their delivery into the custody of Fitzwilliam, the Spanish laid down their arms. The noblemen and officers were separated out, and 300 of the ordinary men were massacred. The surviving 150 fled through the bog, ending up either with Sorley Boy MacDonnell at Dunluce or at the house of Redmond O'Gallagher, the bishop of Derry, and were sent to Scotland. The 45 noblemen and officers were marched to Dublin, but only 30 survived to reach the capital, where they were dispatched to London for ransom.

Tyrone's men captured thirty Spanish officers from the Spanish Armada's September 1588 shipwreck in Inishowen, and handed them over to Hugh MacManus O'Donnell so he could offer the government to exchange them for his son, Hugh Roe, who was then imprisoned in Dublin Castle. This was unsuccessful.

The Armada ship La Trinidad Valencera sank in Kinnagoe Bay, Inishowen. Tyrone's mercenary forces, commanded by his Hovenden foster-brothers, proceeded to Inishowen upon hearing of the presence of Spanish fugitives there. Tyrone's instructions to the Hovendens are unknown; ultimately his forces committed the largest single massacre of Armada survivors in Inishowen. FitzWilliam was suspicious of the Earl's activities and refused to believe this news, but it was confirmed by a Spanish escapee. Historians John Marshall, Hiram Morgan and Matthew McGinty characterise Tyrone as reluctantly ordering the massacre to keep in the English government's good graces. Contemporary sources imply that the massacre was carried out on the actions of the O'Donnell clan, (Note: In a report from Inishowen prior to the massacre, the Hovendens wrote to FitzWilliam: "O'Donnell is willing to serve against [the Spaniards], and hath none of his country as yet come in to him passing thirty horsemen; he hath sent for all his forces, but it is doubtful whether they will come in to him or not". In the 17th-century, the clergy of Donegal Abbey wrote that "[in retirement, Hugh McManus O'Donnell did] penance for his sins, the weightiest of which was a cruel raid on the wrecked Spaniards of the Armada, whom he slew in Innishowen, at the bidding of deputy Fitzwilliam".) who counselled O'Neill's troops, though this is possibly misdirection by Tyrone. Government officials reported that Tyrone heavily reprimanded Hugh McManus O'Donnell for betraying the Spaniards and their refuge, and he contemptuously told O'Donnell to seek dwelling in another country.

On 25 September, the ships La Lavia, La Juliana and the Santa Maria de Vison became shipwrecked at Streedagh Strand in County Sligo. Tyrone himself assisted three sick officers and many commoners, including ordinary seaman Pedro Blanco of La Juliana, who was kept on as his footman and manservant throughout the whole of the Nine Years' War. Tyrone also helped stranded nobleman Don Antonio Manrique escape Ulster. Ultimately about a dozen Spaniards remained in Ireland, as despite their desire to return home, Philip II of Spain believed they would be of better use as emissaries for Tyrone. It seems Tyrone never recruited these Spaniards as soldiers. His decision may have been affected by the hostility the English had towards Lord Brian O'Rourke for recruiting Spaniards into his military.

Three further ships — unidentified — were wrecked on the Donegal coast, one at Mullaghderg, one at Rinn a' Chaislean. The third was found in 2010 at Burtonport.

Antrim: The greatest loss of life was on the sinking of the galleass La Girona. She had docked for repairs to her rudder at Killybegs, where 800 survivors from two other Armada shipwrecks were taken aboard - from La Rata Santa Maria Encoronada and Duquesa Santa Ana, which went aground at Loughros Mor Bay, Donegal. La Girona set sail for Scotland, but on 26 October her rudder broke and she was wrecked off Lacada Point, County Antrim. Of the estimated 1300 people on board, only nine survived.

=== Connacht ===
The Governor of Connacht, Richard Bingham, sought reinforcements from Dublin but his request was denied by Fitzwilliam, who had few resources at his disposal. A proclamation made it treason on pain of death for any man to help Spaniards. Many survivors were delivered to Galway from all over the province. In the first wave of seizures, 40 noblemen were reserved for ransom, and 300 men were put to death. Later, on the orders of Fitzwilliam, all the unarmed noblemen except two were also executed, along with six Dutch boys who had fallen into custody afterward. In all, 12 ships were wrecked on the coast of Connacht, and 1,100 survivors were put to death.

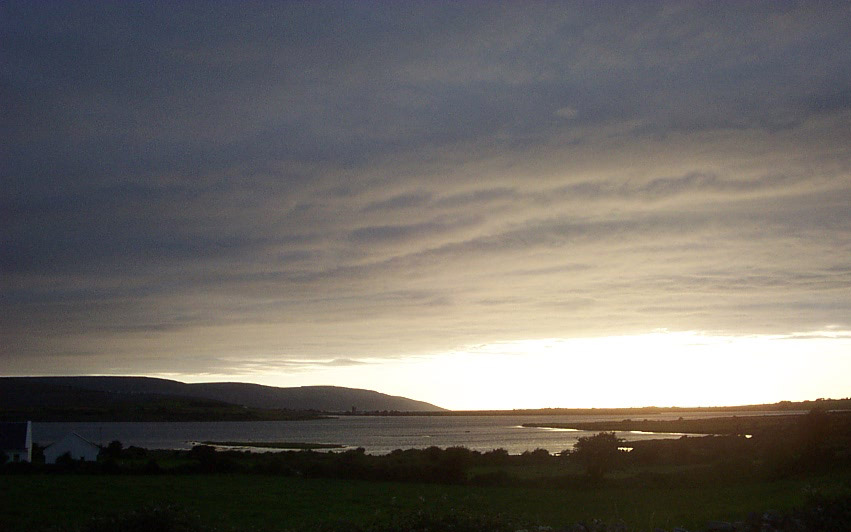
Galway Bay near County Clare.

Galway: Falcon Blanco (300 tons, 103 men, 16 guns) and Concepción de Juanes del Cano of Biscay (225 men, 18 guns) and another unknown ship entered Galway Bay. Falcon Blanco grounded at Barna, five km west of Galway City, and most of those on board made it to shore. Concepción de Juanes del Cano grounded at Carna 30 km further west, having been lured to shore by the bonfires of a party of wreckers from the Clan O'Flaherty

Sligo: Three ships grounded near Streedagh Strand, ten miles North of Sligo town, with 1,800 men drowned and perhaps 100 coming ashore. The wreck-site was discovered in 1985. Among the survivors was Captain Francisco de Cuellar, who gave a remarkable account of his experiences in the fleet and on the run in Ireland.

- La Lavia (25 guns), was a Venetian merchantman and the Vice-flagship;
- La Juliana (32 guns) was a Catalan merchantman; and
- Santa Maria de Vison (de Biscione) (18 guns) was a Ragusan merchantman.

Mayo: In September a galleon was wrecked at Tyrawley (modern County Mayo). Tradition has it that another ship was wrecked in the vicinity, near Kid Island, but no record remains of this event. Also, Gran Grin was wrecked at the mouth of Clew Bay.

Among those ships wrecked in Connacht was the merchant carrack La Rata Santa Maria Encoronada (419 men, 35 guns), which had run for the Irish coast in desperate need of repair, along with four other ships of the Levant squadron and four galleons. La Rata Santa Maria Encoronada carried an unusually large number of noblemen from the most ancient families of Spain — chief among them Don Alonso Martinez de Leyva — as well as the son of the Irish rebel, James Fitzmaurice Fitzgerald.

La Rata Santa Maria Encoronada was skillfully handled along the northern coast of Mayo, but could not clear the Mullet Peninsula, and so anchored in Blacksod Bay on 7 September. The wind got up and the anchors dragged, until the ship was driven on to Ballycroy strand. All the crew got to shore under the leadership of de Leyva, and two castles were seized and fortified with munitions and stores from the beached ship, which was then torched. The rebel's son, Maurice Fitzmaurice, had died on board, and was cast into the sea in a cypress chest.

The Spanish soon moved on to another castle, where they were met by a host of fellow survivors, approaching from the wreck in Broadhaven of another ship, which had entered that bay without masts. De Leyva's host now numbered 600, and the governor of Connacht, Richard Bingham, chose not to confront them. After some days two ships of the Armada entered Blacksod Bay — the merchantman Nuestra Señora de Begoña (750 tons, 297 men) and the transport Duquesa Santa Ana (900 tons, 23 guns, 357 men). De Leyva and his 600 men boarded Duquesa Santa Ana. Nuestra Señora de Begoña sailed straight for Santander, Spain, arriving some time later. Duquesa Santa Ana, however, was somewhat damaged and it was decided to sail north for Scotland. Stormy weather soon hit Duquesa Santa Ana and she was grounded in Loughros Bay in Donegal, with all aboard reaching shore in what was friendly territory.

De Leyva, who had been seriously injured by a capstan, pitched camp on the shore of the bay for nine days, until news came of another ship of the fleet, the galleass Girona, which had anchored in Killybegs harbour while two other ships had been lost on attempting to enter the harbour. With the assistance of an Irish chieftain, MacSweeney Bannagh, Girona was repaired and set sail in mid-October with 1,300 men on board, including de Leyva. Lough Foyle was cleared, but then a gale struck and Girona was driven ashore at Dunluce in modern County Antrim. There were nine survivors, who were sent on to Scotland by Sorley Boy MacDonnell; 260 bodies were washed ashore.

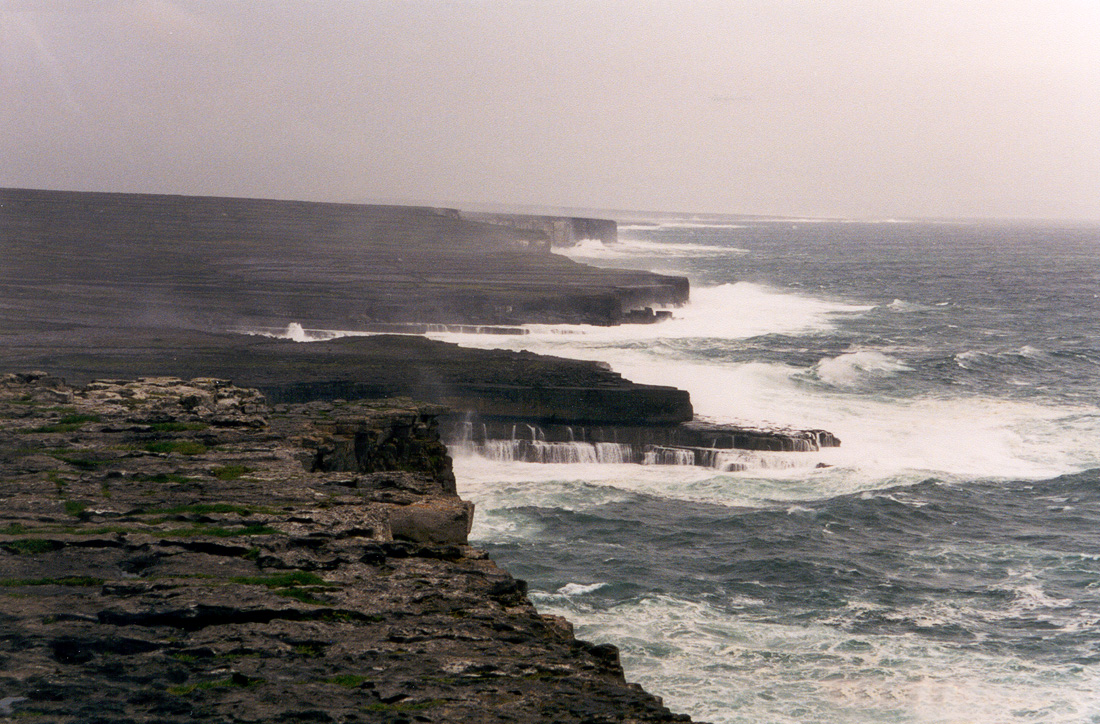
A wild coast on Inishmore, largest of the Aran Islands.

Aran Islands: Two ships were sighted off the Aran Islands: one failed to land a party in hard weather, and it is not known what became of them.

Antrim: The single greatest loss of life occurred upon the wreck of the galleass Girona on the coast of Antrim after she had taken on board many survivors from other ships wrecked on the coast of Connacht (see Ulster, above).

== Aftermath ==
Between 17 and 24 ships of the Grand Armada were lost on the Irish coast, accounting for about one-third of the fleet's total loss of 63, with the loss of about 6,000 men.

By the end of September 1588 Fitzwilliam was able to report to the Queen's secretary, Lord Burghley, that the Armada alarm was over. Soon after, he reckoned that only about 100 survivors remained in the country. In 1596, an envoy of Philip II arrived in Ireland to make inquiries of survivors and was successful in only eight cases.

Following the failure of the Armada the English sent their own fleet against the Iberian peninsula, but failed to press home their advantage and returned with tremendous losses. At the height of the Anglo-Spanish War sent their final Armada consisting of 4,500 troops in the south of Ireland to assist the Ulster rebel leader Hugh O'Neill, during the Nine Years' War (1594–1603). This expedition also failed, and Spain and England concluded a peace in 1604.

By the time of the peace the Spanish had restored their dominance at sea, and treasure from the New World was flowing in to their Royal Treasury at an increased rate. Elizabeth's successor James I neglected his fleet and chose to secure crown influence in Ireland: in 1607 the lords of Gaelic Ulster fled to the continent, and the English conquest of Ireland was largely completed on the seizure and colonisation of their territories in the Plantation of Ulster in 1610.

There is a myth that the Spanish Armada left descendants in Ireland, however research has discredited such claims.

== Salvage ==
The first salvage attempts were made within months, on the coast of County Clare by George Carew, who complained at the expense "of sustaining the divers with copious draughts of usequebaugh" [Uisce Beatha - Irish for whiskey].

Sorley Boy MacDonnell recovered three brass cannons and two chests of treasure from the wreck of Girona.

In 1797 a quantity of lead and some brass guns were raised from the wreck of an unknown Armada ship at Mullaghderg in County Donegal. Two miles further south, in 1853, an anchor was recovered from another unknown Armada wreck.

== The Spanish Armada in art ==
The Grainuaile Suite (1985), an orchestral treatment of the life of the Irish sea-queen Gráinne O'Malley by Irish composer Shaun Davey, contains a lament on the Spanish landings in Ireland, sung by Rita Connolly.

The wrecking of La Girona was commemorated in illustrations of the Armada and the Antrim coast which appear on the reverse side of sterling banknotes issued by the First Trust Bank in Northern Ireland.

The final published novel of Anthony Burgess, Byrne: A Novel, features a protagonist who is specifically stated to be descended from Spanish survivors who remained in Ireland.

The Luck of the Irish and Darby O'Gill and the Little People are American films that make reference to the wrecking of the Spanish armada as an explanation for leprechauns having pots of gold.

The Spanish-Portuguese co-produced short animated film The Monkey (2021), influenced by the story of The Hartlepool Monkey, focuses on the treatment of the Spanish shipwrecked on Irish shores. The film, which stars Colm Meaney won the Goya, for best Best Animated Short Film in 2021.

== See also ==
- List of shipwrecks in the 16th century
- Girona (ship)
- Hugo of Moncada i Gralla

== Sources ==
- T.P. Kilfeather Ireland: Graveyard of the Spanish Armada (Anvil Books Ltd, 1967)
- Ken Douglas Navigation: the key to the Armada disaster (Journal for Maritime Research, Issue: August 2003). ISSN 1469-1957
- Cyril Falls Elizabeth's Irish Wars (1950; reprint London, 1996). ISBN 0-09-477220-7.
- de Cuellar, Francisco. "Account of his service in the Armada and on the run in Ireland".
- Morgan, Hiram (1993). Tyrone's Rebellion: The outbreak of the Nine Years' War in Tudor Ireland. London: The Boydell Press. ISBN 0-85115-683-5.
- Morgan, Hiram (2002). Ó Riain, Pádraig (ed.). "The Real Red Hugh". Irish Texts Society (12). Published through academia.edu. London: 1–17.
- McGettigan, Darren (2005). Red Hugh O'Donnell and the Nine Years War. Dublin: Four Courts Press. ISBN 978-1-8518-2887-6. OL 11952048M.
- McGinty, Matthew (August 2013), The Development and Dynamics of the Relationship between Hugh O'Neill and Red Hugh O'Donnell, pp. 1–69
- Hamilton, Hans Claude, ed. (1974) [1885]. Calendar of the State Papers relating to Ireland, of the reign of Elizabeth, 1588, August—1592, September. Kraus Reprint.
- Marshall, John J. (1907). "The Hovendens: Foster Brothers of Aodh O'Neill, Prince of Ulster (Earl of Tireoghan)". Ulster Journal of Archaeology. 13 (1): 4–21. ISSN 0082-7355. JSTOR 20566288.
- Morgan, Hiram (2013). Peduelo Martin, Eduardo; Rodriguez de Diego, Julia (eds.). "The establishment of the Irish-Spanish relationship" (PDF). Los Irlandeses y la Monarquia Hispanica (1529-1800): Vinculos in Espacio y Tiempo. Madrid: 1–10. Archived (PDF) from the original on 25 May 2024.
- Green, Wm. Spotswood (1906). "The Wrecks of the Spanish Armada on the Coast of Ireland". The Geographical Journal. 27 (5): 429–448. Bibcode:1906GeogJ..27..429G. doi:10.2307/1776373. ISSN 0016-7398. JSTOR 1776373.
