= Grange, County Sligo =

Village in County Sligo, Ireland

Grange Irish: An Ghráinseach
- Village
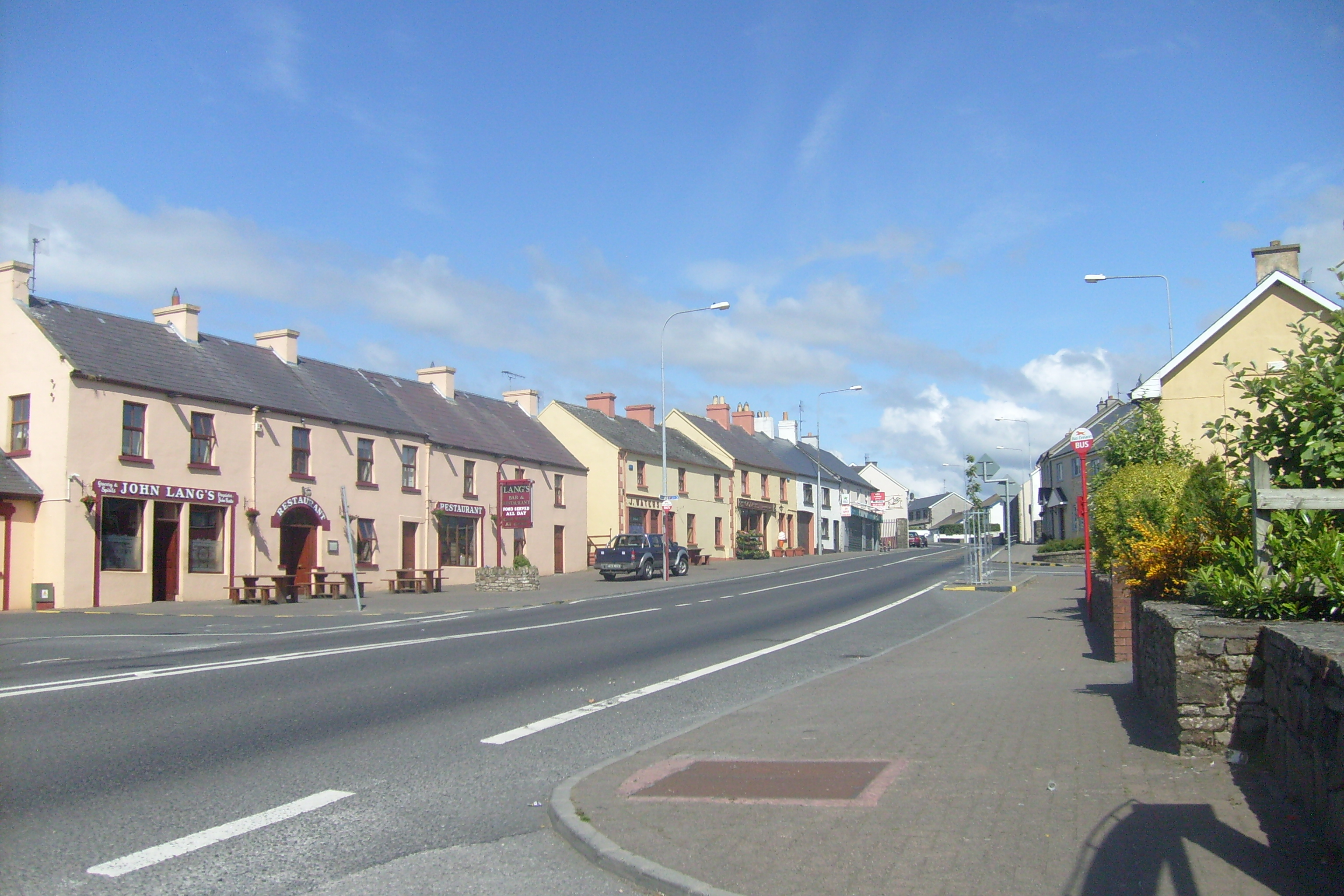
- Grange's Main Street in 2009

- Location in Ireland
- Coordinates: 54°24′00″N 8°31′00″W
- Country: Ireland
- Province: Connacht
- County: County Sligo
- Barony: Carbury

Area
  - Total: 2.27 km^{2} (0.88 sq mi)
- Elevation: 28 m (92 ft)

Population (2022)
  - Total: 569
  - Density: 251/km^{2} (649/sq mi)
- Time zone: UTC+0 (WET)
  - Summer (DST): UTC-1 (IST (WEST))
- Irish Grid Reference: G664502

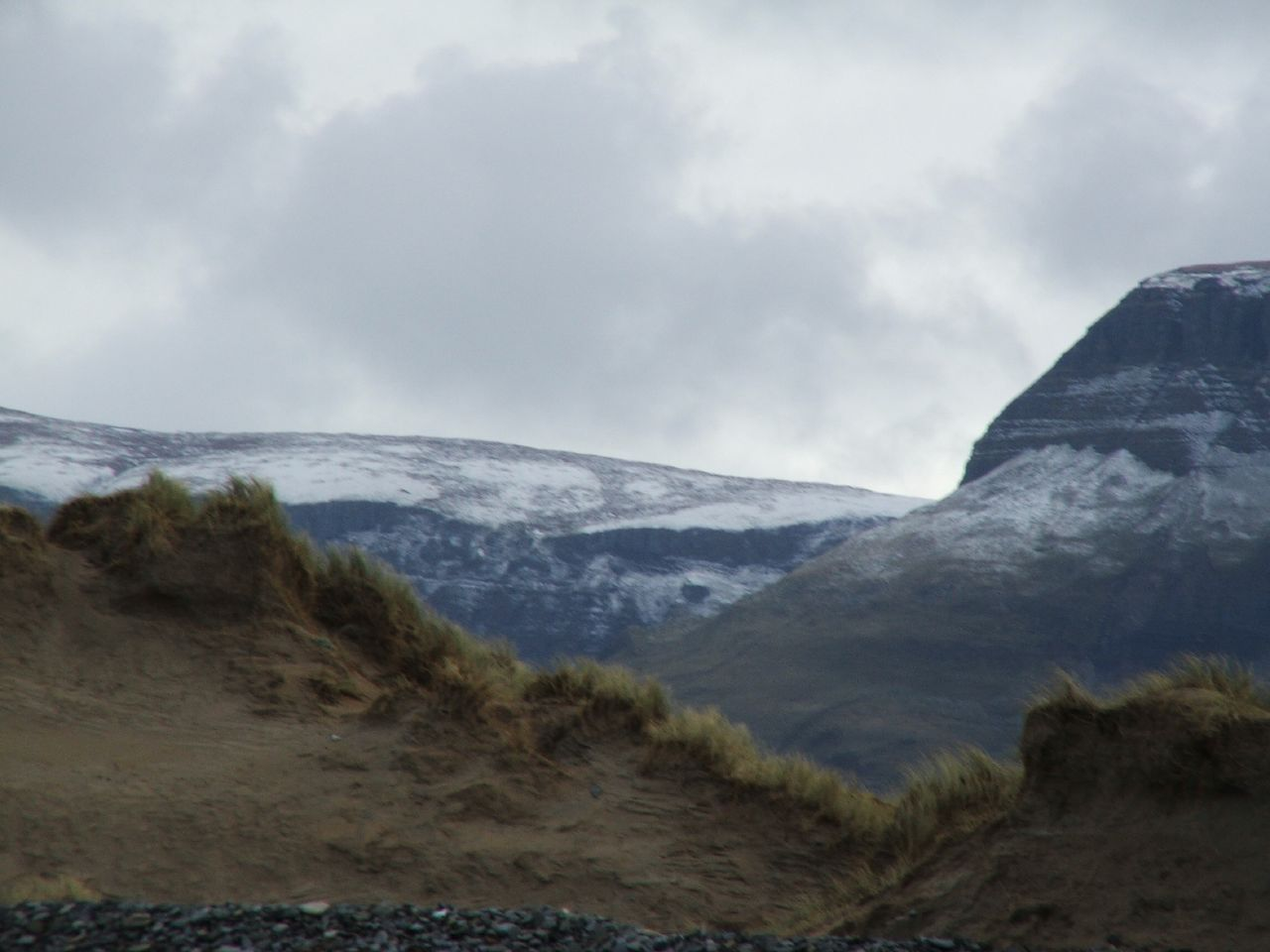
The sand dunes of Streedagh and snow on Ben Bulben

Grange (Irish: An Ghráinseach, meaning 'monastic farm') is a village on the N15 road in County Sligo, Ireland. It is located between Benbulben mountain and the Atlantic Ocean. Streedagh, a townland near Grange, is the location of a large sandy beach, three Spanish Armada wrecks, and a salt water lagoon that is an area of Special Conservation. Streedagh strand is also a surfing destination.

A short distance to the north are the towns of Ballyshannon and Bundoran, a surfing and seaside resort, which are both bypassed, and the villages of Tullaghan and Cliffoney. To the south are Drumcliff, burial place of poet and Nobel laureate W. B. Yeats, and Sligo town.

== History ==
The old village is on the hill to the north of the present village. Grange developed on land belonging to the Cistercian monastery of Boyle in County Roscommon. The village was a stronghold of the O'Harte and O'Connor families throughout the mediaeval period. The O'Hartes provided cavalry for the O'Connor Sligo Lords of Carbury-Drumcliff.

A castle once stood near the centre of the village. The Annals of Ireland record that in 1604 a "new castle and 7 cottages were built by Hugh O'Hart in the town of Grange, Co. Sligo."

After the Irish Rebellion of 1641, the land was granted to Thomas Soden. Colonel W. Wood-Martin, the Irish historian, writes that Soden was probably an officer in Colonel Richard Coote's Regiment of Horse, one of the Cromwellian regiments disbanded in County Sligo. He adds that he received in lieu of arrears of pay, a grant of the town, townland and castle, of Grange. He received this grant on 13 April 1668, under the Act of Settlement of 1701.

=== Lola Montez ===
Grange is the birthplace of Lola Montez, a dancer, courtesan, and mistress of King Ludwig I of Bavaria.

Born Eliza Rosanna Gilbert in Sligo, she caught the eye of Bavaria's King Ludwig I in 1846 by claiming to be an exotic dancer from Spain. Although married, the king took up with her, even making her the Duchess of Landsfeld. Bavarian citizens put up with their king's cavorting, but their patience snapped when his courtesan began meddling in state affairs. Ludwig was forced to abdicate and Montez had to flee. She never saw him again, but she remained a duchess.

=== Spanish Armada ===
Three Spanish Armada transport ships – La Lavia, La Juliana and the Santa Maria de Vison – were lost off Streedagh strand in September 1588, an event commemorated by a monument close to the beach. One of the survivors, Captain Francisco de Cuéllar, recorded the events of the time in detail. He documents his shipwreck at Streedagh, the subsequent events ashore, and his attempts to find hospitality from local chieftains (O'Rourke and McClancy) in the then English-garrisoned North Sligo, as he made his way back to Spain via Antrim and Scotland.

At Streedagh Strand in 1985, marine archaeologists discovered the wreck site of the three ships of the Armada. In spring 2015, after storms sent some artifacts onto the strand, the Department of Arts, Heritage, and the Gaeltacht sent divers to recover what the storms had uncovered. One particular find was a bronze cannon decorated with the image of Saint Matrona of Barcelona, which bears the initial "D" on its touchhole – the mark of the Genoese gunfounder Girardi Dorino II. Other pieces with this mark recovered from the wreck indicate that he cast most of what became La Juliana's bronze ordnance. The cannon is dated 1570, which corresponds to the date of La Juliana's construction; according to the Irish government, this puts the identity of the third wreck "beyond doubt".

A Spanish Armada interpretive centre opened at Grange's old courthouse in 2018.

=== Modern history ===
In 2012, Grange was in the news when early-20th century Mills type 36 grenades were discovered at a private home in the village. The village made national news in August that year when a herd of 105 sheep was stolen. A sperm whale washed up on the shore close to Grange in 2019.

== Amenities ==
There are two schools in the village, a Roman Catholic church, and church hall, post office, and bathroom store.

The Church of Mary Immaculate combines modern with traditional elements, particularly lancet windows. It has a nave with five bays and its sacristy is in the corner, north-east. Its roof is pyramidal and has a carved limestone cross set above an ashlar limestone bell-cot with chamfered podium within whose pointed arch opening is the bell.

== Sport and leisure ==
North Sligo Sports Complex is located in the village. The complex has an indoor association football pitch, also used for badminton and basketball. There is a squash court, racquetball court, changing room facilities, and meeting room in the complex. Outside the complex, there is a running track, where North Sligo Athletic Club meet (as well as at Oxfield Sports Centre), and both a grass and all-weather association football pitches. There was also a community park, now converted to a playground. At the north end of the village is a pitch, Molaise Park, where local Gaelic football (GAA) teams train and play. The local GAA club celebrated its centenary in 2007.

== People ==
- Caroline Currid, sport psychologist
- Eugene Gilbride, TD
- Tom Gilmartin, businessman, whistleblower and pivotal Mahon Tribunal witness
- Cyril Haran, Gaelic footballer/manager and local priest
- Mona McSharry, Olympic medallist in swimming
- Christopher O'Donnell, Ireland International track and field athlete
- Lola Montez, Gräfin von Landsfeld

== See also ==
- List of towns and villages in the Republic of Ireland
