= Greyhound (1747 ship) =

Ship from 1714

History

Great Britain
- Name: Greyhound
- Namesake: Greyhound
- Owner: Mrs. Alley
- Builder: Whitby
- Launched: 1747
- Fate: Wrecked 12 December 1770

Greyhound was a coastal trading vessel launched in Whitby in 1747 or possibly before that was wrecked in a storm off the coast of County Sligo on 12 December 1770. Lloyd's List reported on 1 January 1771 that Greyhound, Douthard, master, had been lost at Sligo while on the way from Galway to Whitby.

The wreck has been known locally as The butter boat.

== Vessel ==
Greyhound was owned by a Mrs Alley in 1747 and was a transport in 1748.

== Wreck ==
Greyhound had been caught in a storm off the coast of County Mayo. The crew could not get shelter in Broadhaven Bay and were forced to anchor near Erris Head. The crew abandoned ship, then realised they had forgotten the cabin boy. Some of the crew, along with volunteers and crew of a passing ship Mary, from Galway, returned to rescue him and managed to get aboard Greyhound. The storm was so bad that the vessel was driven ashore at Streedagh Ppoint, where 20 of the 21 on board drowned. The sole survivor had stayed on board and when the vessel settled on the beach he alerted people, but the others had already been lost.

== Speculation on identity ==
Over time, the identity of the wreck had been lost, leading to speculation that it might have been part of The Spanish Armada, or a tourist boat.

== Identification ==
Oak timbers from the wreck were dated to some time after 1712 in the first half of the 18th century by dendrochronologist Dr. Aoife Daly. The National Monuments Service said that the timber was probably sourced from the English midlands or Yorkshire. This was cross-referenced to a database of over a hundred shipwrecks off the Sligo coast in the 18th and 19th centuries, the Irish Folklore Commission, and newspaper accounts, leading to the vessel being identified.

== See also ==
- Streedagh Armada wrecksite - a nearby wrecksite
