= Gortnaleck (disambiguation) =

Gortnaleck is a townland in County Cavan, Ireland.

Gortnaleck may also refer to other things in Ireland:

- Gortnaleck, County Donegal; see List of townlands of County Donegal
- Gortnaleck, County Sligo; see List of townlands of County Sligo
  - Gortnaleck Court Tomb, a court cairn in County Sligo
