= Kinnagoe Bay =

Beach in Ireland

Coordinates: 55°15′N 7°00′W

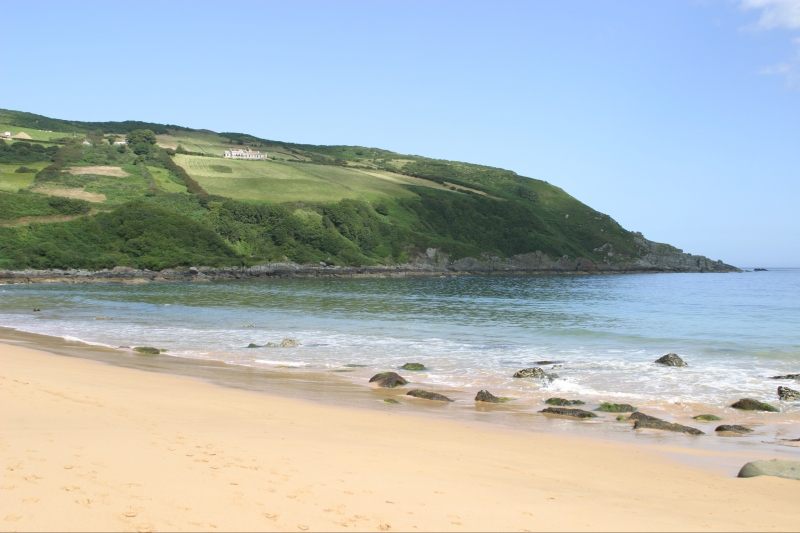
Kinnagoe Bay

Kinnagoe Bay (Irish: Bá Chionn an Ghabha) is a beach in Inishowen, County Donegal, Ireland. The wreck of a Spanish Armada ship, La Trinidad Valencera, was discovered in the bay in 1971. The sinking of this ship, on 16 September 1588, is memorialised by a plaque in the area. The beach is accessible by a road from the top of the hill. There is a small car park at the beach which gets very busy during the summer. It is one of the places of interest on the Inishowen 100 scenic route.

== Fishing ==
Kinnagoe Bay attracts fisherman from all around Ireland. The wreck of La Trinidad Valencera is favoured by some fish, which can be caught by either spinning from the rocks or casting from the beach. They include pollack, wrasse, coalfish, dogfish, bass, and flounder.
