= Streedagh Armada wrecksite =

- Straide
- Interactive map of Streedagh Armada wrecksite
- Type: Site of three sunken ships
- Periods: 16th century
- Cultures: Spanish, Catalan, Ragusan, Italian
- Associated with: Crew and soldiers of the Levant Squadron of the Armada
- Location: Shelving slope of sandy bay, 3 m (9.8 ft) to 5 m (16 ft)
- Region: Connacht

History
- Built by: Unknown.
- Abandoned: Sank September 1588
- Event: wind-driven onto sandbank during storm after loss of anchors

Site notes
- Material: Wooden, bronze, iron
- Height: Depth differential is 3 m (9.8 ft) vertical, with scattered artifacts, 5.2 m (17 ft)
- Excavation dates: Discovered 6 May 1985
- Condition: Conservation, sampling and study are ongoing
- Public access: Objects recovered are under conservation. Not on display at the moment.

The Streedagh Armada wrecksite is the site of three shipwrecks of the Spanish Armada at Streedagh beach (/ˈstriːdə/, STREE-da) in north County Sligo, in northwest Ireland. The three ships are La Lavia, La Juliana, and the Santa Maria de Visón. All were part of the Levant (eastern) squadron of the armada. The Lavia was the almiranta, or vice flagship of the fleet and carried the Judge Advocate General, Martin de Aranda, responsible for the discipline of the armada.

== Discovery ==
After extensive documentary research of over three years, an English salvage team, the Streedagh Strand Armada Group, identified the wrecksite on 6 May 1985. Subsequently, a court battle was fought over salvage rights. The wrecks are protected under the National Monuments (Amendment) Acts 1987 and 1994 which prevents any diving on the wrecks except under licence from the Irish government.

== Background ==
The three ships had set sail in the Levant squadron with the rest of the Armada from Lisbon on 29 May 1588. The Lavia (homeport Venice) had been requisitioned on 16 February that year at Lisbon. The Juliana (home port Barcelona) on 16 December 1586 in Sicily, and the Santa Maria de Vison (home port Ragusa/Dubrovnik) on 6 May 1587 at Naples. The Levant squadron consisted of 10 ships and had a complement of 767 seamen and a total of 2,780 soldiers.

They were large merchant vessels and intended as transports for the men and equipment required for the invasion of England. The Levant squadron was under the command of Don Martin de Bertendona. The squadron contained some of the largest transports in the Armada. The Lavia had Martin de Aranda, the Judge Advocate General of the fleet on board. It was to him De Cuellar was sent for sentencing after his court martial.

The ships were carracks, which were often some of the largest vessels of their day, and favoured for merchantmen due to their large cargo holds. There is some confusion as to whether tonnages given are burdened weight, as practice varied, but this is the most likely interpretation. The three ships manifests were as follows.

The Santa Maria de Vison de y Biscione carried 18 guns, 70 sailors, 236 soldiers and displaced 666 tons. She was possibly functioning as a hospital ship and therefore may have had more people on board than the official count. During the voyage half the fleet's medical supplies were transferred to the Santa Maria de Vison from the Casa de Paz, which had been deemed unseaworthy.

La Lavia, a Venetian merchantman from Naples and the vice-flagship of the squadron, mounted 25 guns, displaced 728 tons, had a crew of 71 sailors and transported 271 soldiers.

The Juliana was a Catalan merchantman from Barcelona with 32 guns, displacing 860 tons. Built in 1570, she had 65 crew, 290 soldiers and an estimated 325–520 tons burthen. This ship was perhaps carrying siege train parts and tools and potentially heavy guns as part of the siege train for use against fortifications. The cannons recovered at the site 1 wreck site show the Matrona of Barcelona and bear the mark of the Genoese gunfounder Gioardi Dorino II, which confirm this as the wreck of the Juliana.

In all, the three ships displaced 2,254 tons and carried a minimum of 807 soldiers and 206 sailors making an estimated minimum complement of 1,013 people on board the ships at the time of the sinking. The number is likely to have been considerably higher though, due to inter-ship transfers from damaged or lost vessels.

The ships had incurred heavy damage in the fighting in the English channel, where the Levant squadron was one of the first engaged. They had also cut their main anchors loose after contact with English fireships just before the battle of Gravelines. These factors, added to the difficulty these carracks had in sailing to windward and their lack of heavy equipment for north Atlantic sailing, left them the most vulnerable part of the fleet.

Unable to round Erris head against a southwesterly gale, the squadron was driven in towards the coast at Cairbre, now county Sligo, and on 17 September the ships dropped anchor 2 miles offshore and prepared to ride out the storm. On 21 September the storm worsened and changed to the west-northwest from which the ships had no shelter. Hit broadside by huge seas, the cables broke and the ships were driven onto the shore where they rapidly broke up. The scene was described by the eyewitness and survivor Francisco de Cuellar

..and not being able to weather round or double Cape Clear, in Ireland, on account of the severe storm which arose upon the bow, he was forced to make for the land with these three ships, which, as I say, were of the largest size, and to anchor more than half a league from the shore, where we remained for four days without being able to make any provision, nor could it even be made. On the fifth day there sprang up so great a storm on our beam, with a sea up to the heavens, so that the cables could not hold nor the sails serve us, and we were driven ashore with all three ships upon a beach, covered with very fine sand, shut in on one side and the other by great rocks. The likes of this had never been seen for, within the hour, our three ships broke up completely, with less than three hundred men surviving. Over a thousand drowned among them many important people, captains, gentlemen and regular officers....many men drowned inside the ships, while others jumped into the water never to come up again

— Captain Francisco de Cuellar

== Wrecksite ==
The site consists of three locations roughly parallel to the shore, marked by the discovery team as sites 1, 2 and 3. The state of preservation of the wrecks is unknown, but thought to be very good both in organic remains and in the remains of the articulated timber hulls of the ships so far recorded. Further excavations took place in 2015 after timber wreckage was found on the shore. Six cannon were recovered, making nine in total so far recovered from the wreck of the Juliana.

=== Site 1 ===
Site 1 is located just off the centre of the beach. Based on magnetometer readings site one covers an area of 165 m × 40 m (180 yd × 44 yd). The depth is 3.8–5.2 m (12–17 ft); the spread may represent the fact that this is in an exposed position and subject to the most disturbance. Three guns identified at this site are those from La Juliana and it is presumed this is her wrecksite. A total of five spoked wheels were identified in initial investigations. Three bronze guns were recovered in 1985 here.

In 2015, storms exposed the wreck-site again and a salvage operation was commenced by the National Monuments Service of the Irish state. Nine guns, a gun carriage wheel and cauldron were recovered by divers during this phase. Several of these guns bear the date 1570, matching the Julianas build date, and were cast by the Genoese gunfounder Gioardi Dorino II. One gun shows evidence of Turkish manufacture, perhaps having been captured at the battle of Lepanto in 1571.

=== Site 2 ===
390m to the southwest of site 1 is a concentration of magnetometer readings extending 15m by 10m at a depth of 3.5 to 5.0 metres. This site is identified as the location of the Santa Maria de Vison, but this awaits confirmation. It is possible this represents a partial signature from metal remains and not the ship itself.

=== Site 3 ===
A further 20m to the southwest of site 2 is a large cluster of readings extending 270m by 72m. This location has the largest buildup of sand as it is sheltered by the headland to the southwest. This site is identified as that of the Lavia, however this is not certain. In 1987 two wooden gun carriages with their bronze guns were revealed. One was a truck type previously unrecorded on Spanish vessels at this time, the other was a trailed carriage in good condition with both wheels still attached. A breech loading swivel gun identified as a falcon pedrero was also identified.

=== Conclusion ===
Considering the large scale of site 3 and the small scale of site 2 it is possible that both the Lavia and Santa Maria de Vison are located in this area having sunk together.

== Legacy ==
The site is unique in the world and represents an unparalleled preservation of three late 16th century ships in a coastal location. Monitoring and surveying continues as the wrecks are in a vulnerable high energy environment that is frequently exposed to storms.

The event is commemorated every year in the village of Grange with a festival. In 2018 a new visitors centre telling the story of the shipwrecks was opened.

Another wreck on the beach, visible at low tide and known as the "butter boat" was thought to be related to the armada, but archaeological testing in 2016 has shown it to be an 18th-century wreck. It was subsequently identified as the Greyhound, a coastal trading vessel that travelled regularly between Britain and Ireland. Twenty people died when it was swept out to sea in December 1770.

== See also ==
- The Greyhound - a nearby wreck of a vessel, wrecked 1770
