= Caroline Currid =

Irish sports psychologist

- Born: 1980/1981; Grange, County Sligo
- Education: Master's degree in Sport psychology
- Alma mater: Open University; University of Jordanstown
- Occupation: Sports psychologist
- Years active: 2007–present
- Known for: Her involvement with four All-Ireland winning teams: Tyrone (2008); Tipperary (2010); Dublin (2011); Limerick (2018, 2020, 2021, 2022, 2023, 2026)

Caroline Currid (born 1980/1981) is an Irish sports psychologist who worked as a performance coach with the Limerick senior hurling team between 2016–2023 and again from 2025. Before this, she had similar roles with the Tyrone senior football team, the Tipperary senior hurling team and the Dublin senior football team, teams based in three different provinces.

Currid has won seven All-Ireland titles in two sports while working with those four teams. Sean McGoldrick, writing in the Irish Independent in 2018, described Currid as "one of the most sought-after figures — particularly in the GAA".

== Early life ==
Currid is a native of the village of Grange, County Sligo. Having worked in banking, she sustained a cruciate ligament injury in 2005. During her rehabilitation an interest in sports psychology began. She left banking and studied for a degree in psychology through the Open University. She then achieved a master's degree in sports psychology from the University of Jordanstown. With the Sligo football team, Currid won an All-Ireland Junior Ladies' Football Championship medal in 2006. She had lost the two previous finals.

== Career ==
=== Gaelic games ===
Currid began her involvement as a performance coach at inter-county level within the GAA by approaching the then Tyrone manager Mickey Harte in 2007; he agreed and Currid was brought aboard.

Thus began a run that would lead to Currid working with four different All-Ireland winning teams in the Gaelic games of football and hurling. First, there was the Tyrone county football team that won an All-Ireland Senior Football Championship (SFC) in 2008. Then came the Tipperary county hurling team that won an All-Ireland Senior Hurling Championship (SHC) in 2010. This was quickly followed by the Dublin county football team that won an All-Ireland SFC in 2011. The fourth All-Ireland winning team which Curried worked with was the Limerick county hurling team that won an All-Ireland SHC in 2018. The Tyrone team overcame a Kerry team that was favourite to achieve a three-in-a-row run of titles, the Tipperary hurling team had not won a senior All-Ireland for nine years, the Dublin football team had not won a senior All-Ireland for sixteen years, while the Limerick hurling team had not won a senior All-Ireland for forty-five years. The Tipperary and Dublin All-Ireland victories came in the second year of her involvement with the teams.

Currid was often singled out for praise by members of the management team during Limerick's run to the 2018 All-Ireland SHC. When the Limerick hurling team bridged a forty-five year gap to win the senior All-Ireland SHC title, team captain Declan Hannon directly referred to Currid in his victory speech after the final, saying: "She has just been phenomenal with us for the last two years. She has always been there for us, always there to keep us up and pick us up when we are down. She's after inheriting 36 new babies!" Match analyst Liam Sheedy, whose Tipperary hurling team had been assisted by Currid to an All-Ireland SHC title eight years previously also said: "She deserves massive credit, that is four times now! Tyrone, Dublin, ourselves and Limerick. I do think the Limerick teams over the years didn't have the inner belief but they went behind to Kilkenny, went behind to Cork. There is no doubt about it, she has worked on their inner strengths. Their mindset today was 'we are coming up here to play!'" Four years later, Currid sat between Declan Hannon (captain) and John Kiely (manager) to be interviewed by Joanne Cantwell on television after Limerick completed a run of three consecutive All-Ireland SHC titles.

After two years away, during which time she was involved with Maigh Cuilinn's successful bid for the Galway SFC title, as well as her rugby commitments (see below), Currid's return to the Limerick senior hurling team was announced in November 2025.

=== Outside Gaelic games ===
While working with the Tyrone senior footballers, Currid also worked with rugby union player Paul O'Connell from 2008, doing so until he retired in 2016; though initially not accepting of her ideas when she drove to Limerick to meet him in August 2008, O'Connell remained aware of her work with Tyrone and telephoned her after watching their 2008 All-Ireland SFC victory the following month to inform her that he had changed his mind and wished to work with her.

Currid was drafted into the Irish men’s national team's management setup by interim head coach Paul O’Connell for their two-game mini-summer tour of Georgia and Portugal in June 2025.

Currid also worked with David Rudisha, the 800 metres runner from Kenya, before his victory and world record at the 2012 Summer Olympics, focusing on how to maximise performance on competition day. She was struck by the way the Kenyan athletes lived in the moment, which gave a high level of clarity to their performance.

She has worked with The Celtic Football Club in Scottish association football and, more recently, with Munster Rugby.
