= Gortnaleck Court Tomb =

- Tuama Cúirte Ghort na Leice (Irish)
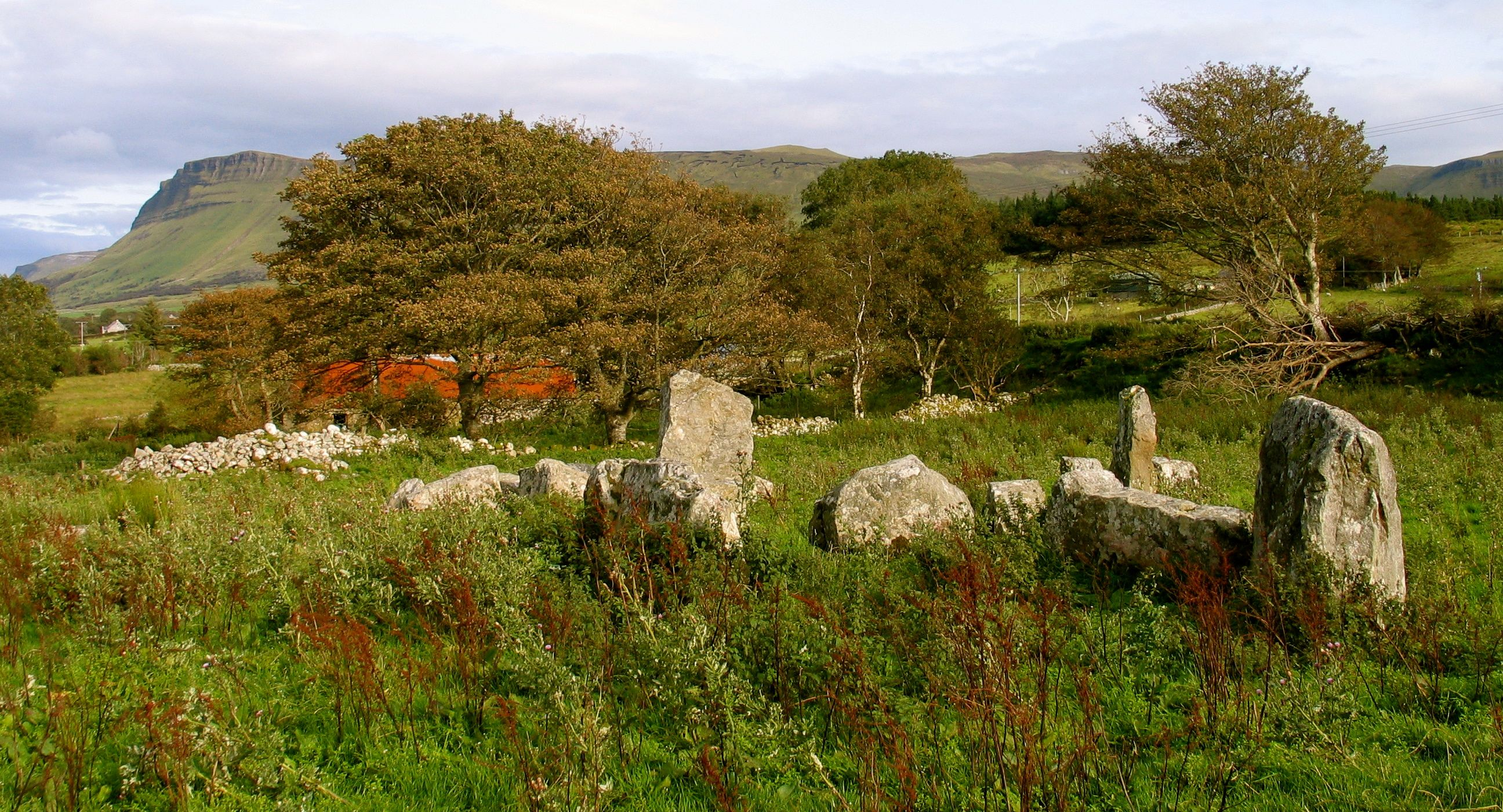
- The tomb in 2011

- Location in Ireland
- 54.384563°N 8.484219°W
- Type: court cairn
- Location: Gortnaleck, Grange, County Sligo, Ireland

History
- Built: c. 4000–2500 BC

Site notes
- Elevation: 63 m (207 ft)

National monument of Ireland
- Official name: Gortnaleck Court Tomb
- Reference no.: 607

Gortnaleck Court Tomb is a court cairn and National Monument located in County Sligo, Ireland.

== Location ==
Gortnaleck Court Tomb is located in a small field on a deserted farm 2.1 km (1.3 mi) north of Benbulben and 2.7 km (1.7 mi) east-southeast of Grange. Benbulben dominates the view to the east while there is a wide view out across the Atlantic Ocean to the west. The monument is on private property.

== History ==
Gortnaleck Court Tomb was constructed in the Neolithic, c. 4000–2500 BC. The monument was surveyed by Sean O Nuallain for the Megalithic Survey of County Sligo which was published in 1976.

== Description ==
The monument consists of a central court which is 6 m (20 ft) in diameter. An entrance passage to the south leads into the court. A pair of galleries open to the east and west. The west gallery is 7 m (23 ft) long and the east is 5 m (16 ft) by 2.5 m (8 ft 2 in) long. The majority of the cairn stones are missing, haven been used to construct the massive drystone field walls around the monument.
