= La Juliana =

Merchant vessel launched in 1570 near Barcelona, Spain

History

Spain
- Name: La Juliana
- Namesake: Juliana of Nicomedia
- Builder: Barcelona
- Launched: 1570
- Commissioned: 1568
- Fate: Wrecked 22 September 1588

General characteristics
- Class & type: Carrack
- Tons burthen: 860 tons
- Propulsion: Sails
- Sail plan: Full-rigged ship
- Complement: 65 crew
- Armament: 32 guns of various weights of shot

La Juliana (Spanish pronunciation: [la xuˈljana]) was a merchant vessel launched in 1570 near Barcelona, Spain. King Philip II commandeered her on 15 December 1586 at Sicily, and had her armed with 32 guns for the Spanish Armada. In 1985, local divers found the wreckage of three vessels of the Armada that had been driven ashore in autumn 1588 at Streedagh Strand, north of the Rosses Point Peninsula on the west coast of Ireland. Two were identified as La Lavia and the La Santa Maria de Vison; La Juliana was probably the third, but that identity was less certain. The three vessels had been part of the Levant squadron, which had been under the command of Don Martin de Bertendona in La Regazona. La Lavia was the vice flagship.

In spring 2015, after storms sent some artifacts onto Streedagh Strand, Ireland's Department of Arts, Heritage and the Gaeltacht sent divers to recover what the storms had uncovered. One particular find was a bronze cannon decorated with the image of Saint Matrona of Barcelona, which bears the initial "D" on its touchhole – the mark of the Genoese gunfounder Gioardi Dorino II. Other pieces with this mark recovered from the wreck indicate that he cast most of what became La Juliana's bronze ordnance. The cannon is dated 1570, which corresponds to the date of La Juliana's construction; according to the Irish government, this puts the identity of the third wreck "beyond doubt".
