= Henry Hovenden =

Anglo-Irish secretary (died 1610)

- Born: Ireland
- Died: 24 September 1610; Rome, Papal States
- Burial place: San Pietro in Montorio, Rome
- Children: Robert Hovenden

Henry Hovenden (Note: Alternate spellings of his surname are Ovington, Ovenden and Hovendon.) (died 24 September 1610) was an Anglo-Irish (Note: Hovenden has been described as an "Englishman", though in all likelihood he was born in the Pale, which was the part of Ireland under English control. It seems both his parents were born and raised in England.) secretary and lawyer. He was foster-brother and chief advisor to Hugh O'Neill, Earl of Tyrone during the Irish Nine Years' War.

Historian John Marshall described Hovenden as O'Neill's "captain, councillor, and confidant". He was commonly known as Harry.

== Family background ==
The Hovenden family had roots in Kent, England. Henry's parents were Giles Hovenden, an English settler in Laois, and Elizabeth Cheevers, daughter of Sir Walter Cheevers. He had five siblings – John, Peter, Richard, Walter and Joanne, all born and raised in Ireland – of which Henry was the youngest son.

== Early life ==
Sometime after 1558, young brothers Hugh and Brian, grandsons of Irish Gaelic nobleman Conn O'Neill, (Note: Shane O'Neill maintained that Matthew was not Conn's biological son.) were moved into the Hovenden family's care. Their father Matthew had been killed in a succession dispute, and the Crown sought to keep the children safe from harm. Ultimately, their aim was to raise Hugh and Brian in the English manner, so that they would be more sympathetic to the English administration once they came of age and took their places in the Gaelic nobility.

To this end, Giles acquired the lease to a property in Balgriffin formerly belonging to Conn, via an arrangement made with the Crown. Giles had a pre-existing business connection with Conn. This is the residence where Henry Hovenden grew up. Henry Hovenden and Hugh O'Neill were raised by Giles' second wife Joan Walshe. By December 1563, Giles Hovenden had died and Joan had remarried to John Piggott. She continued to raise the children.

== Career ==
Henry Hovenden and Hugh O'Neill remained close throughout the rest of their lives, and Hovenden became his secretary and advisor. One of the first records of their professional association is from 23 August 1583, when he was mentioned as being involved in a dispute between O'Neill and the Viscount Gormanston. In November 1583 and June 1585, Hovenden is mentioned as O'Neill's messenger and ambassador to the English Privy Council.

In May 1586, Hovenden bribed William Cecil to overlook O'Neill's increasingly dubious activities. O'Neill commonly bribed government officials throughout his career, and it appears that Hovenden was responsible for much of the logistics.

Henry and his brother Richard commanded O'Neill's troops in the late 1580s. In late 1588, 23 ships of the Spanish Armada were lost on Ireland's coast. Lord Deputy William FitzWilliam ordered the execution of Spanish survivors. Tyrone's mercenary forces, commanded by his Hovenden foster-brothers, proceeded to Inishowen upon hearing of the presence of Spanish fugitives there. Tyrone's instructions to the Hovendens are unknown; ultimately the Hovenden brothers organised the largest single massacre of Spanish Armada survivors in Inishowen. They killed 500 to 600 Spaniards. On 14 September 1588, writing from Dungannon, Henry Hovenden reported to FitzWilliam that "they with 150 men attacked the Spaniards at Illagh, the O'Docartaig town, and the second day took them prisoners. Pray for a warrrant for their victualling &c, to Dublin. One of the prisoners has commanded over 30,000 men."

In 1595, Hugh Roe O'Donnell separated from his wife Rose (also O'Neill's daughter) in order to form a dynastic marriage alliance with Lady Margaret Burke, daughter of the Ulick Burke, 3rd Earl of Clanricarde. O'Neill sent Hovenden to communicate advice to O'Donnell.

O'Neill trusted Hovenden to such a degree that, in January 1596, he paused negotiations with Elizabeth I's Commissioners purportedly due to Hovenden's absence. During this time Hovenden was busy meeting with a Spanish messenger.

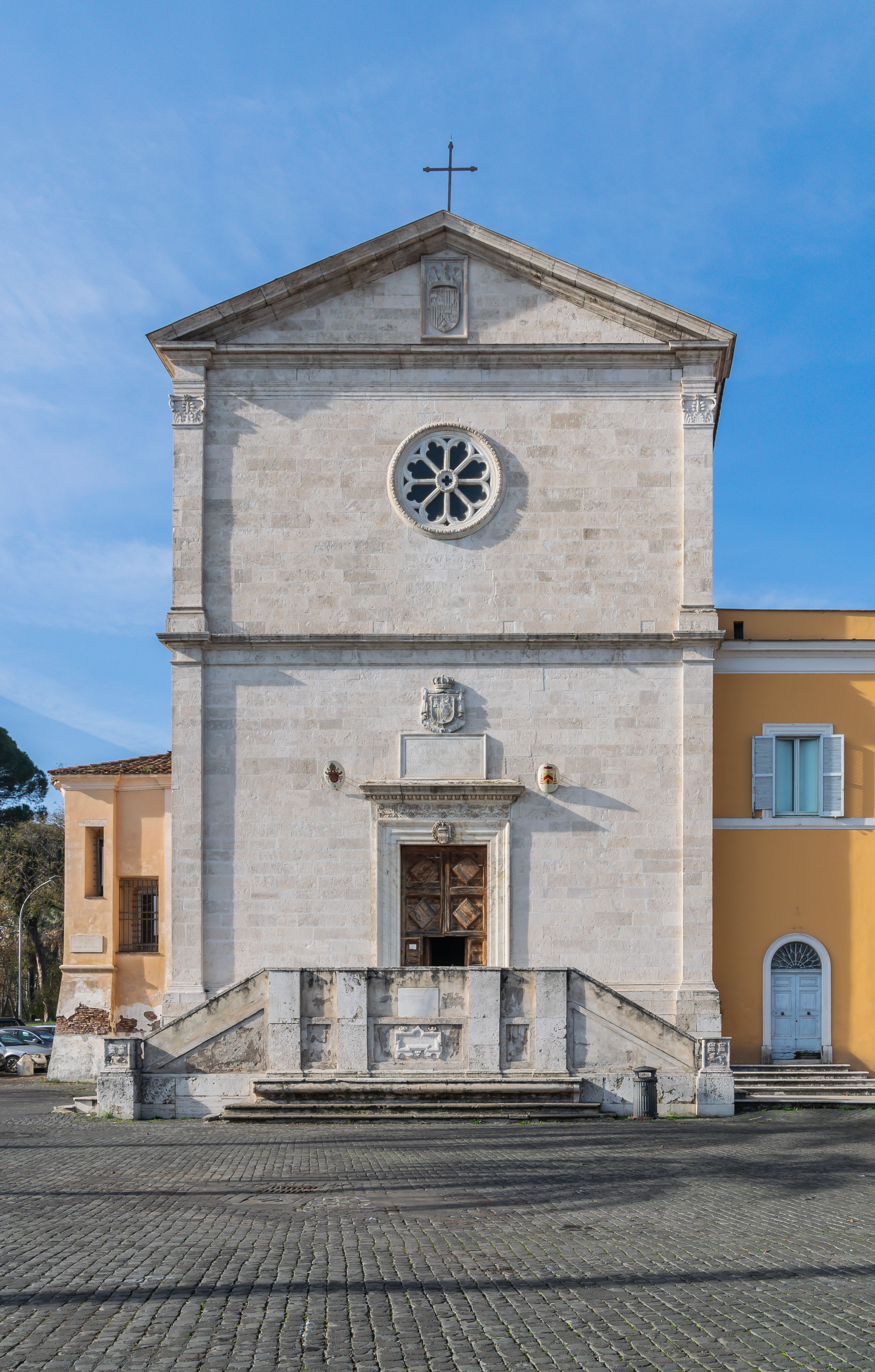
San Pietro in Montorio, Hovenden's burial place.

Around 1596, Henry Hovenden was ostensibly sent to assist military leader Hugh Roe O'Donnell in pacifying Connacht, however the state intercepted a letter which boasted that "all the delays that could possibly be used for prolonging the causes here have not been omitted".

Unlike Henry and Richard, their brother Walter remained loyal to the Crown. On 7 December 1597, Walter was killed in battle by the Irish forces of rebel leaders Owny MacRory O'More and Richard Tyrrell.

Hovenden was one of six confederate witnesses present at a riverside conference with English officers on 7 September 1599. This was a follow-up to the well-known riverside parley between Tyrone and Lord Deputy Essex earlier that day. It is highly likely that Hovenden drafted O'Neill's public proclamation of 5 November 1599, which included a list of 22 proposed terms for a peace agreement to Queen Elizabeth I.

In late 1600, Hovenden was victim to a surprise attack by loyalist Niall Garve O'Donnell once Niall defected to the English army.

Henry Hovenden resided in Dungannon. He took part in the Flight of the Earls in 1607, leaving Ireland for Continental Europe. His wife remained in Ireland, and was granted relief in the form of his goods.

Hovenden had a son, named Robert, who married Catherine O'Neill, daughter of Turlogh MacHenry O'Neill of the Fews. Catherine's first husband was Turlough MacHenry Óg O'Neill, a grandson of Hugh O'Neill, by whom she was mother of Felim O'Neill of Kinard.

== Death ==
It appears Hovenden never returned to Ireland. He died on 24 September 1610 and was buried in San Pietro in Montorio, where various Irish nobles (including O'Neill) are buried. No commemorative slab was inscribed for Hovenden.

== In media ==
Hovenden is a character in Brian Friel's play Making History. In its original 1988 production, Hovenden was played by Irish actor Niall O'Brien.
