= La Lavia =

Venetian merchant ship

History

Spain
- Name: La Lavia
- Builder: Venice
- Acquired: Requisitioned on 16 February 1588 for service in the Armada
- Fate: Ship wrecked on 22 September 1588

General characteristics
- Class & type: Carrack
- Tons burthen: 728 tons
- Propulsion: Sails
- Sail plan: Full-rigged ship
- Armament: 25 guns of various weights of shot

La Lavia was a Venetian merchantman. She was a class of ship known as a carrack often used as merchant ships due to their capacious holds. She was requisitioned at Lisbon for service in the Spanish Armada of 1588. She was wrecked on 22 September on the coast of Cairbre, now county Sligo in northwest Ireland, along with two other ships, La Juliana and the Santa Maria de Vison.

The name (pronounced [la ˈla.β̞ja]) is from Venetian or Spanish La Via, "the way."

== Armada service ==
She was the Almiranta, or Vice Flagship of the Levantine (eastern) Squadron. She also had on board the Judge Advocate General of the armada, Martin de Aranda. He was ultimately responsible for dispensing justice and therefore was in charge of discipline for the fleet. His staff consisted of a chief assistant, a licentiate named Magaña, four notaries, six military police, a jailer and six guards.

It was to this ship that the Spanish officer Francisco de Cuellar was transferred for judgement after being sentenced to death by courts martial for breach of discipline after the battle of Gravelines in the English channel. The Judge Advocate declined to carry out the sentence on de Cuellar, saving his life. De Cuellar later wrote an account of his adventures.

He ordered me to be taken to the ship of the Judge Advocate General, that his advice should be carried out on me. I went there; and although he was severe, the Judge Advocate—Martin de Aranda, for so they called him—heard me, and obtained confidential information concerning me. He discovered that I had served His Majesty as a good soldier, for which reason he did not venture to carry out on me the order that had been given him. He wrote to the Duke about it, that if he did not order him in writing, and signed by his own hand, he would not execute that order, because he saw that I was not in fault, nor was there cause for it. Accompanying it, I wrote a letter to the Duke of such a nature that it made him consider the affair carefully, and he replied to the Judge Advocate that he should not execute the order upon me, but on Don Cristobal, whom they hanged with great cruelty and ignominy, being a gentleman and well known...

— Francisco de Cuellar, 1591, Antwerp

== Wreck ==
The wreck-site of the Lavia was discovered in 1985 by an English salvage crew off the north Sligo coast at Streedagh strand. The wreck is protected under the National Monuments (Amendment) Acts 1987 and 1994. Monitoring and excavation are ongoing at the site.
