= Matrona of Barcelona =

Saint Matrona of Thessalonica
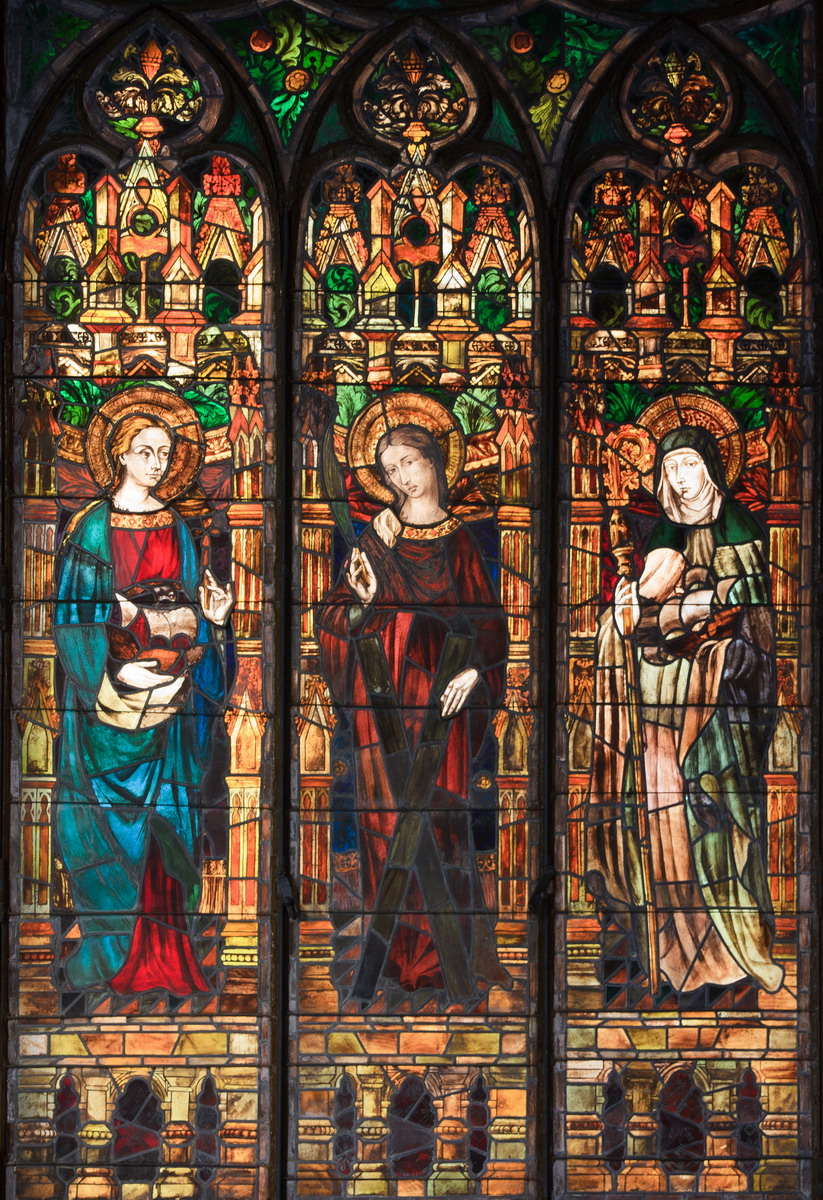
- Stained glass window at Barcelona City Hall with St. Matrona in the left panel

Virgin Martyr
- Born: 3rd or 4th Century AD
- Died: 3rd or 4th Century AD; Thessalonica, Macedonia, Roman Empire
- Honored in: Orthodox Church, Catholic Church
- Canonized: Pre-Congregation
- Feast: 27 March (Orthodox), 15 March (Catholic)
- Patronage: Barcelona, dysentery

Matrona of Barcelona or Matrona of Thessalonica (Catalan: Madrona, IPA: [məˈðɾonə]) is a saint of the Roman Catholic Church and the Orthodox Church.

She lived in the third or fourth century. She was a young girl and a slave of the Jewish woman Pautila (or Pantilla), wife of one of the military commanders (some sources say governor) of Thessalonica. According to legend, she believed in Christ from her youth and Pautila constantly tried to convert her to Judaism. There are two versions of her martyrdom, in one she was killed in Rome for taking time to ministering to Christians, in the other she was so severely beaten when she refused to enter a synagogue with her mistress that she subsequently died of her wounds.

She is venerated in Barcelona and some villages in Catalonia. She is patron saint of the Santa Madrona church in Barcelona, the Santa Madrona hermitage in the mountain of Montjuïc, as well as churches in the villages of Madrona (Pinell de Solsonès) and Móra d'Ebre. The feast day for the Matrona of Barcelona is 15 March in the West, and 27 March (9 April old style) in the East.
