= Erris Head =

Promontory in County Mayo, Ireland

- Ceann Iorrais
- IUCN category IV (habitat/species management area)
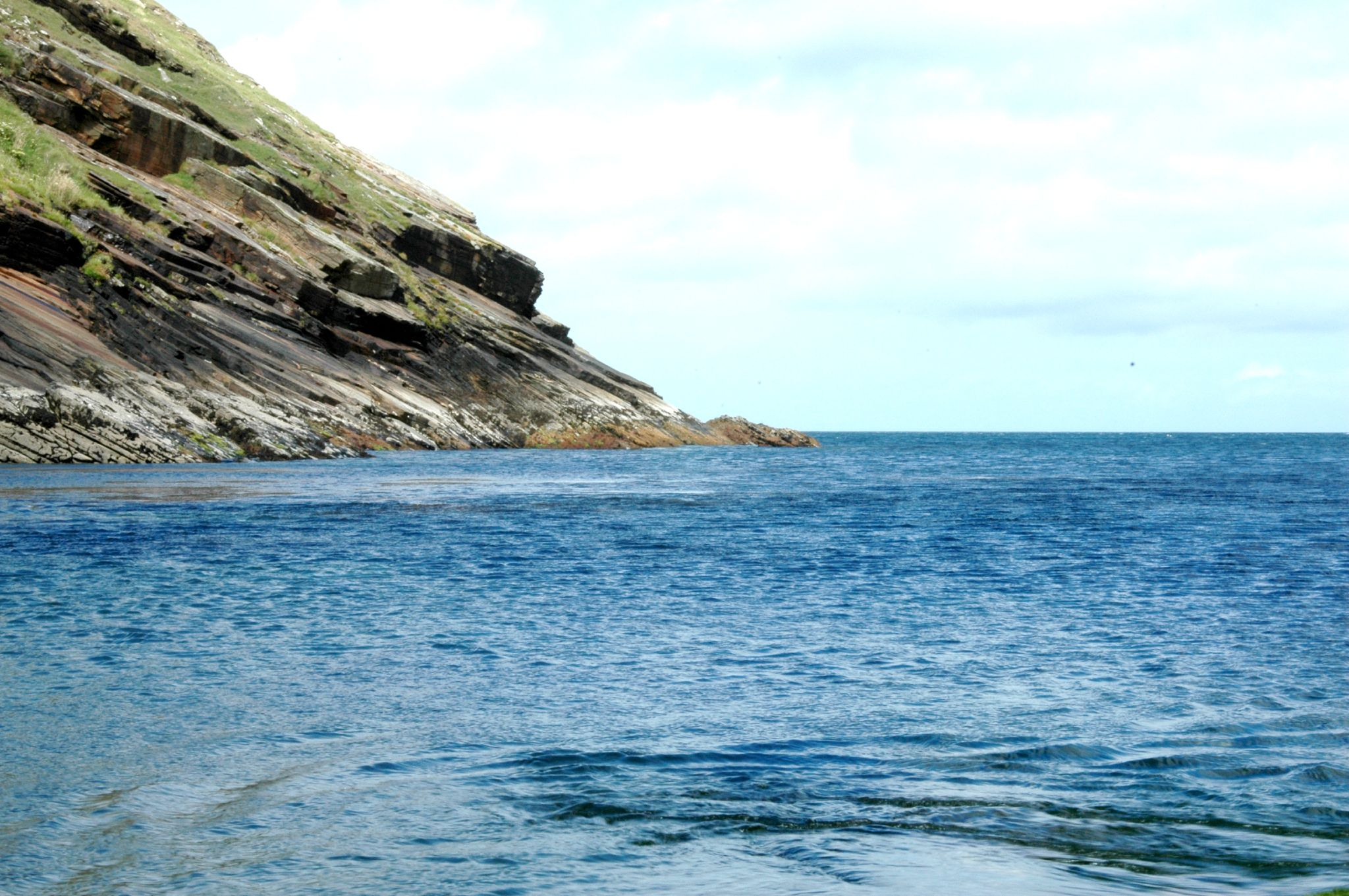
- Erris Head

- Location within Ireland
- Location: County Mayo, Ireland
- Coordinates: 54°18′05″N 9°59′50″W
- Governing body: National Parks and Wildlife Service (Ireland)

Erris Head (Irish: Ceann Iorrais) is a promontory at the northernmost tip of the Mullet Peninsula, located in the barony of Erris in northwest County Mayo, Ireland. It is used as a landmark by mariners and weather forecasters, and is also a scenic viewpoint, with views of the Atlantic Ocean and steep rocky cliffs. It is not served by any road and can only be reached by crossing a number of fields.

== Special Area of Conservation ==
Erris Head has been designated a Special Area of Conservation (SAC) under the European Union's Habitats Directive.

This dry heath supports juniper, bearberry, crowberry and heather. There are wet flushes and areas of wet heath, and here grow blunt-flowered rush, three species of sundew and the rare marsh helleborine orchid.

Seabirds nest on the cliffs, with fulmars and great black-backed gulls being most numerous, and peregrine falcons and choughs also breed here. In winter, barnacle geese feed on the grasslands above the cliff. Irish hares and common frogs occur on the headland, and grey seals can often be seen at the foot of the cliffs.

=== Marine reserve ===
A section of sea, stretching 200 metres (660 ft) from the base of the cliffs, is included in the conservation site. It was included because it is used by the seabirds nesting on the cliffs at Erris Head.

== See also ==
- Wild Atlantic Way
