= Santa Maria de Visón (de Biscione) =

Merchantman ship in the Spanish armada

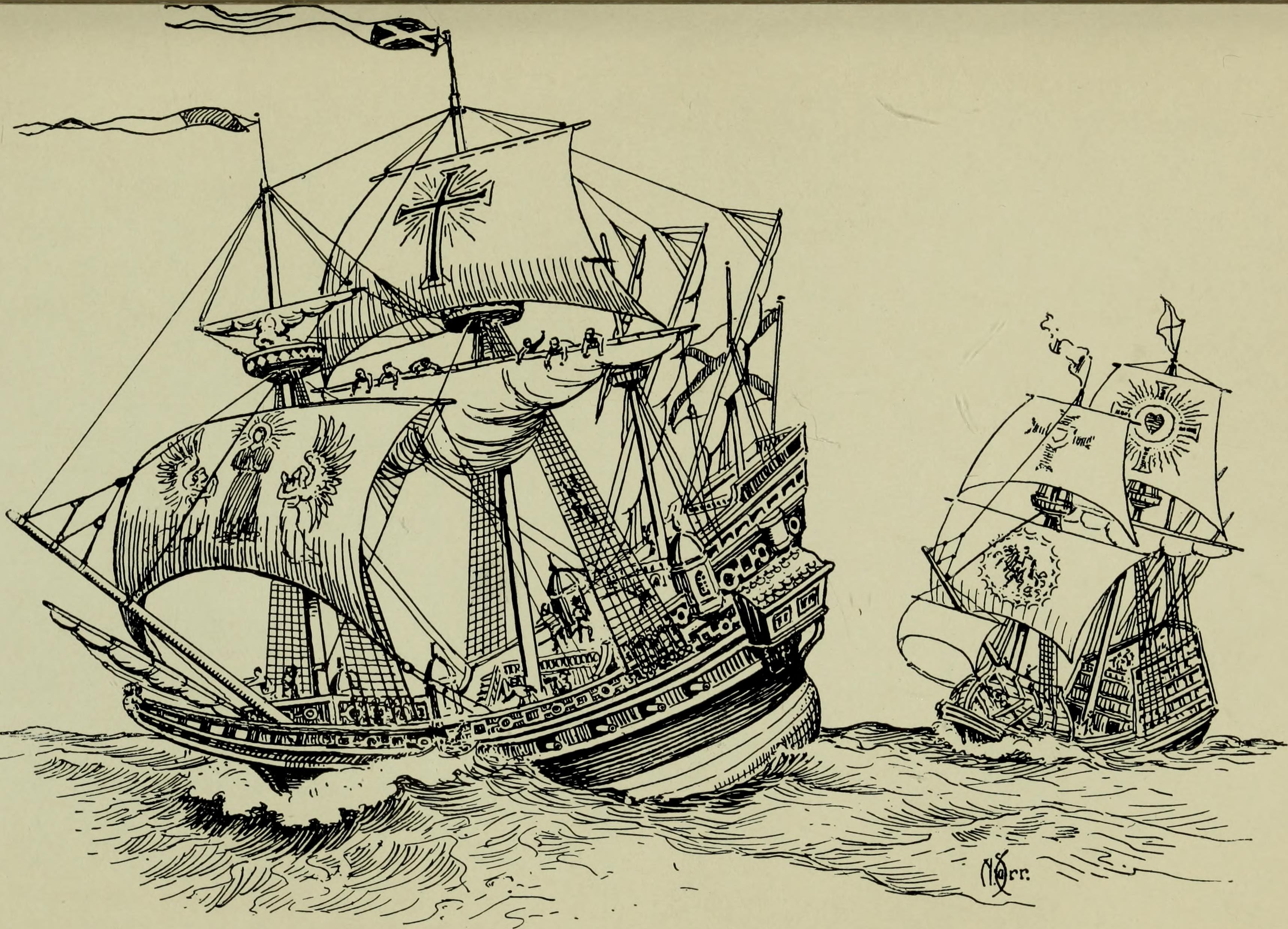
- Drawing of two Armada-era carracks

History

Spain
- Name: Santa Maria de Vison
- Builder: Ragusa
- Acquired: Requisitioned for Armada 6 May 1587 at Naples
- Fate: Wrecked 22 September 1588

General characteristics
- Class & type: Carrack
- Tons burthen: 666 tons
- Propulsion: Sails
- Sail plan: Full-rigged ship
- Complement: 70 sailors
- Armament: 18 guns of various weights of shot

The Santa Maria de Visón was a Mediterranean merchantman built in Ragusa and requisitioned in 1587 for service in the Armada of 1588. She was a large carrack and displaced 666 tons and carried 18 guns.

Her name (pronounced [ˌsãn̪.t̪a maˈɾi.a ð̞e̞ biˈsõn]) literally meant 'Saint Mary of the Viper, and is also given as Santa Maria de Biscione ('of the grass snake'). These names referred to the heraldic Biscione, a serpent with a child in its mouth which symbolised Milan.

== Armada service ==
She was part of the Levant squadron, a unit made up of mainly heavy transports carrying equipment and soldiers for the land invasion of England. Only one of the Levant squadron made it back to Spain. During the voyage half the fleet's medical supplies were transferred to this ship after the La Paz became unseaworthy.

== Wreck ==
She was wrecked during a storm on 22 September 1588 off the coast of Cairbre Drom Cliabh (now county Sligo) on a sandbank off Streedagh strand. Her wreck was discovered in 1985 by an English salvage team. The wreck is protected under the National Monuments (Amendment) Acts 1987 and 1994.
