= Urris =

Valley near Clonmany, County Donegal, Ireland

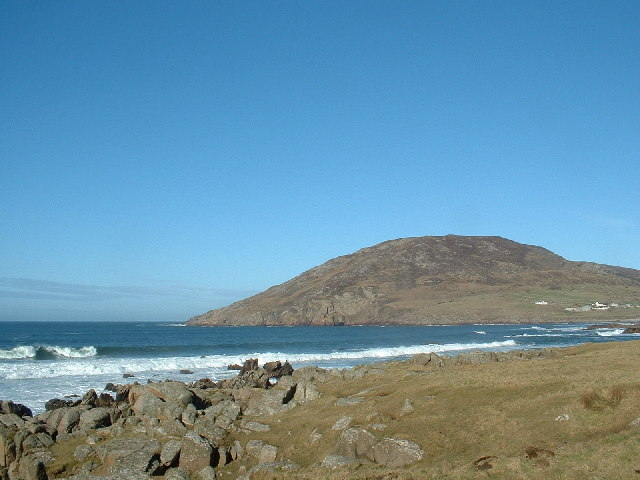
Dunaff Bay

Urris (Irish: Iorras) is a valley to the west of the parish of Clonmany, in County Donegal, Ireland. It comprises the townlands of Crossconnell, Dunaff, Kinnea, Leenan, Letter, and Urrismenagh. It sits on the eastern side of Loch Swilly and it is bounded to the south-east by the Urris hills, and to the east by Binion hill. To the north, there is Rockstown bay and Tullagh peninsula. There are two entrances to Urris; the Gap of Mamore, and Crossconnell.

Urris has some local tourist attractions, such the Dunaff cliffs, Tullagh beach, Rockstown Harbor, Leenan pier and Gap of Mamore. There are a number of traditional thatched cottages in good condition within Urris.{

== History ==
=== Mesolithic period ===
Dunaff bay is the site of Ireland's oldest neolithic campsite. The bay lies at the mouth of Lough Swilly, between the cliffs of Dunaff Head to the north and Leenan Head to the south. The site contained a number of early Irish Mesolithic artifacts, including unabraded flints comprising a few leaf-shaped flakes, some blade-like flakes and a large amount of waste material. The location is regarded as an "industrial site" producing material associated with the so-called Early Larnian tradition.

=== Colonel Daniel McNeill ===
During the early 18th century, the valley was terrorized by local landlord who targeted young women in the area. Colonel Daniel McNeill, a Scottish Planter who had fought at the Battle of the Boyne and defended Derry, resided in Binion. He commanded a group of Herdsmen, known locally as "The Yowmen," who instilled fear in the local community. It is said that any woman he desired would be forcibly taken to Binion, where she was allegedly subjected to rape. In cases where his victims became pregnant, he granted them small portions of land to support their children, known as "McNeills Roods." These parcels of land can still be found scattered throughout Urris and along the road to Clonmany. At the Pollen fair, McNeill tried to abduct a young local woman but failed when she managed to escape into the crowd. Later that evening, as he returned from the fair, he was ambushed and killed by a group of local men.

McNeill was buried in the graveyard of Straid Church. In the mid-19th century, it was still possible to identify his grave, where it was recorded that he died on 11 September 1709, aged 59.

=== Wolfe Tone ===
Theobald Wolfe Tone, leader of the 1798 Irish Rebellion, was captured by the Royal Navy off Dunaff Head, Lough Swilly in November 1798.

=== The Poitín Republic of Urris ===
In the early 19th century, Urris became a center of the illegal poitín distillation industry, and continued to be one of the main economic activities of the area throughout the century. Due to its remote and barren geography, the Urris Hills were an ideal place for poitín-making because the area was surrounded by mountains and only accessible through the Mamore Gap over the Urris Hills and Crossconnell to the East. Derry provided a major market for the trade. In an effort to curtail illegal production, the authorities levied ‘township fines" - a collective fine that was placed on an entire community if there was a suspicion that some of its residents were engaged in poitín production.

In 1812, the distillers in Urris, Donegal, took measures to protect their profitable illicit distillation operations. They established a system of scouts who would alert them of the approaching government officials. When officials were spotted, the locals would position themselves above the road on both sides of Mamore Gap and throw rocks to obstruct their passage. Additionally, the road at Crossconnell was barricaded to prevent the revenue police and local constabulary from entering the area.

In May 1815, the authorities regained control of the Urris Hills. General Dalziel led a military force into the valley, marking the end of the period of self-rule. This era came to be known as the "Poitin Republic of Urris." The term "Poitín Republic" was first used in the 20th century. There are no reliable records detailing the governance of the area during that time.

Once the authorities restored revenue collections in the area, the local population were again subjected to frequent raids from the Revenue Police and township fines. These raids were often accompanied by public disturbances. In 1818, the disruption caused by these raids led the population to petition parliament for relief from the frequent levying of fines. The text of the petition highlighted many of the concerns of the local population:

That the petitioners are compelled to endure the most vexatious and oppressive exactions under the name of fines for illicit distillation, imposed upon the aforesaid Parish and townlands contained therein; that many persons who are guiltless or incapable of illicit distillation, have been forced to pay large portions of such fines, and that all proofs of individual innocence are rejected as reasons for exemption from payment of them; that the severity of diverse persons professing to bear excise commissions has been so great that alarming disturbances have broken out in their neighborhood and that the ordinary execution of the laws has failed in restoring tranquility.

Poitin continued to play an important role in the local economy in the pre-famine period. In 1843, the Revenue Police conducted a major raid on an active poitin still owned by Bryan Harkin of Lenan. Harkin, along with four other men, were arrested. Upon hearing of the arrests, a large number of local inhabitants gathered to prevent the arrests. Eventually, Harkin persuaded the crowd to disperse and agreed to accompany the police to Buncrana. Harkin's protection of the police later formed the basis for an appeal after he was convicted of illegal poitin production.

=== Land reform ===
The ownership of land was very contentious issue throughout the 19th century. During the 18th century, the primary landlords were the Bishop of Derry and the Marquis of Donegal. In 1810, the townlands of Tullagh, Kinnea, Letter, Dunaff, and Urrismenagh were sold an absentee landlord - Sir Robert Harvey.

=== Sir Roger Casement ===
In 1904, the Irish nationalist Sir Roger Casement spent six months learning Gaelic at an Irish Language College in Urris. He lodged in a house in Tiernasligo. He subsequently returned to Inishowen in 1913, where he tried to organize the Irish Volunteers within the Urris Valley.

=== Second World War ===
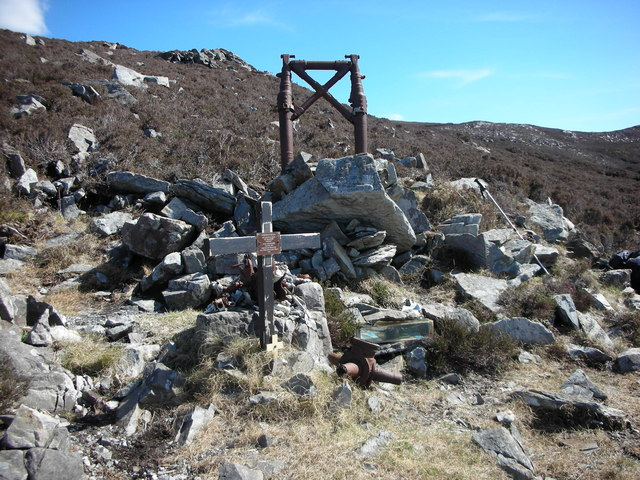
Air crash site

At around 3pm, 11 April 1941, a Vickers Wellington bomber (W5653) crashed into the Urris Hills, resulting in the deaths of its six crew members. The cause of the crash was a navigational error. The plane was returning from a convoy escort patrol to RAF Limavady.

The pilot became disorientated in thick fog and mistook Lough Swilly for Lough Foyle, while attempting a visual landing at Limavady. As the plane descended, it crashed into the hills. Irish Free State soldiers began a search of the area, which was hampered by thick fog. Due to weather conditions and the difficulty of reaching the crash site, it was not immediately possible to bring to bodies down from the hill. The dead airmen were F/O Alfred Cattley (40888) who piloted the craft; P/O James Montague (81359); Sgt John Bateman (959540); Sgt Francis Whalley (977309); Sgt Frederick Neill (976110); and Sgt Brinley Francis Badman (976192). They were assigned to RAF 221 squadron.

In June 1942, a mine washed up in Urris and exploded. There were no reported fatalities or injuries.

=== Binion Head Fishing Disaster ===
On 17 August 1962 three fishermen from Rockstown drowned when their lobster boat hit submerged rocks and sank off Binion Head. The three men were Patrick Doherty (aged 40), John McGilloway (aged 50) and his son, also called John McGilloway (aged 24). Patrick Doherty left behind a wife and five children ranging in age from ten to four years.

== Places of interest ==
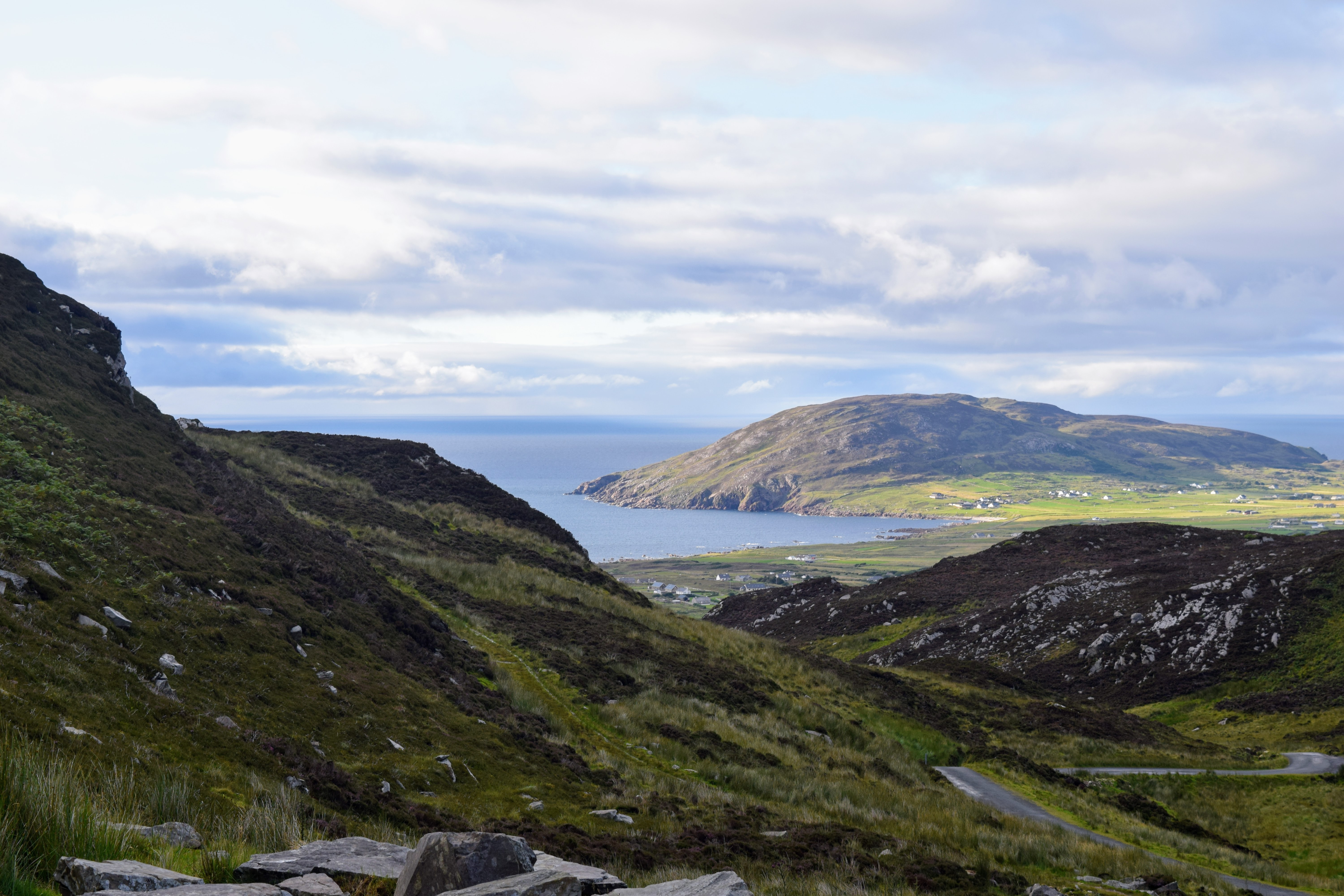
The view from the Mamore Gap holy well.

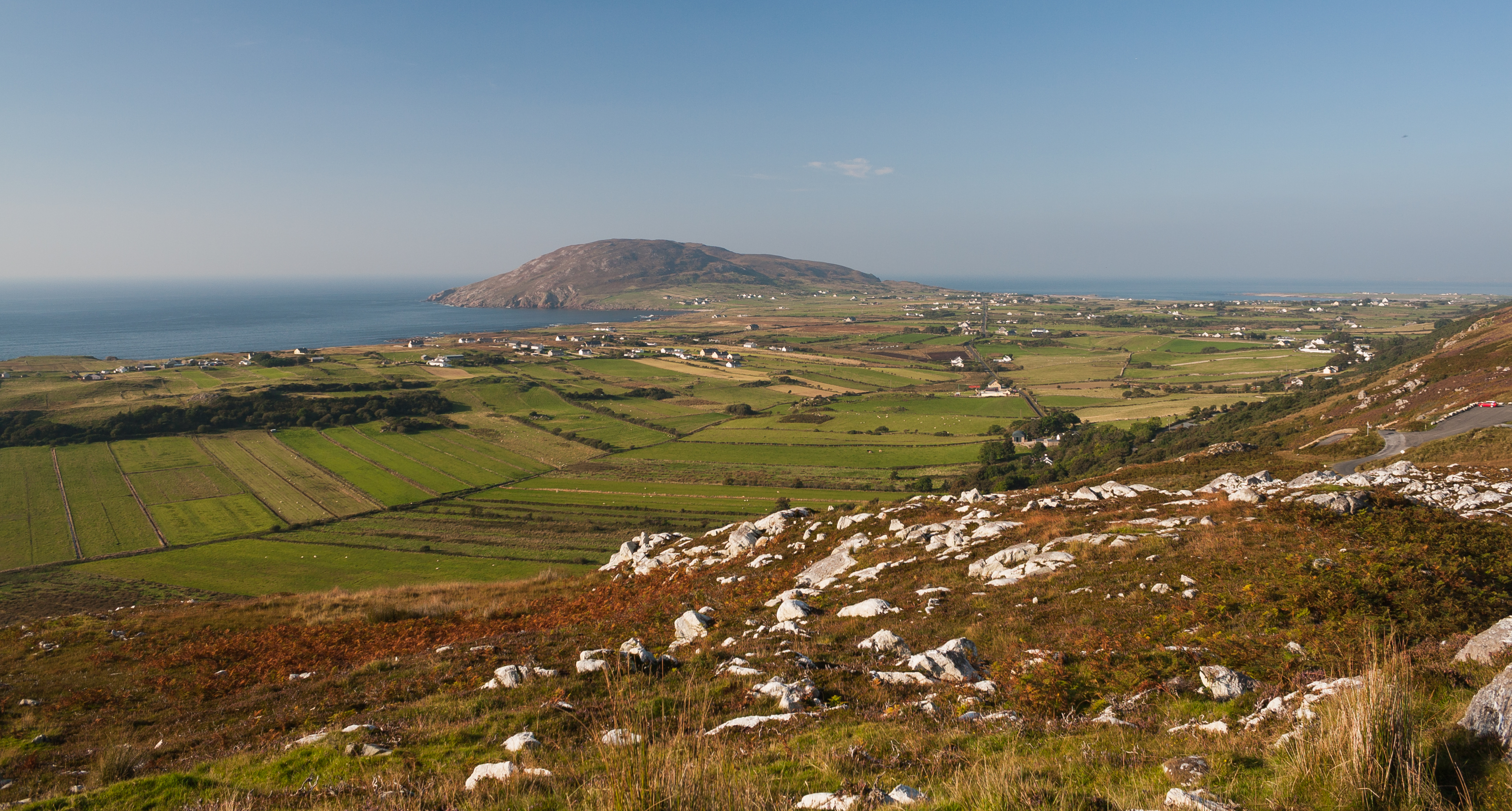
The view of Urris from Mamore Gap

- Mamore Gap is a pass through the Urris hills that links the local town of Buncrana and Urris.
- St. Eigne's Well - Also known as the Holy Well at Mamore Gap, this well is 700 feet above sea level. It is a small structure surrounded by rocks, located just a few yards away from the Gap Road. The significance of St. Eigne's Well dates back to ancient times when it was customary for people to embark on a pilgrimage known as the "turas" from August fifteenth to September eighth. During the turas, pilgrims perform a ritual involving walking around seven heaps of stones while reciting personal prayers. It was customary to throw a stone into each heap as part of the pilgrimage. Additionally, pilgrims drink the well's water, and offering prayers. The identity of St. Eigne' remains a subject of debate.
- Dunaff Hill - A mountain with an elevation of 210 meters (689 feet). Its coordinates are 55.2783° North and 7.5153° West.
- Bothanvarra - 70m high sea stack, just beyond Dunaff head.
- Raghtin Mor (Irish: Reachtain Mhór, meaning "great, big element") - A mountain in the Urris Hills on the south-east side of the valley. It has an elevation of 502 m (1,647 ft). On the mountain summit stands a megalithic cairn.
- Leenan Fort - A military installation that was built in 1895 to defend the deep-water anchorages of Lough Swilly. The fort was initially armed with three 9.2 inch guns. It was refitted in 1911 with two newer 9.2 inch models. During the First World War, the Royal Navy used Lough Swilly as an anchorage for the Grand Fleet. It was also a staging point for Atlantic convoys. After the Irish War of Independence Lough Swilly and the forts at Leenan and Dunree were one of the three Treaty Ports specified in the Anglo-Irish Treaty. These military installations, including Fort Leenan, were handed over to the Irish Free State in 1938. Fort Leenan was closed in 1946. The site is now derelict and contains many dangerous hazards.
- Lenan Strand Trail - The trail commences at Lenan Strand. It covers a variety of terrains, including bog roads, ancient cart tracks, and expanses of open country. Measuring approximately 6.5 kilometres in length, completion of the trail typically requires 2 to 3 hours. The trail is challenging. It is not suited for novice hikers.

== Irish language ==
The Urris area was the last bastion on the Inishowen peninsula where the Irish language was spoken regularly. The Ordnance Map Surveyor, John O'Donovan, visited the area in August 1835. He reported to the superintendent of the Ordnance Survey in Dublin that "the men only, who go to markets and fairs, speak a little English, the women and children speak Irish only".

== Religion ==
On the crest of Mamore Gap there are a number of religious sites associated with the Roman Catholic tradition. Saint Columba is believed to have vanquished the water dragon Giollamach in the pass.The area is served by St. Michael's Roman Catholic Church, which was built in 1888.

== Sport ==
The area hosts the Urris Gaelic Athletic Association team for Gaelic football, which has a pitch located just outside Urris, in the Townland of Straid. The club were county intermediate champions in 1982.

== Culture ==
=== In literature ===
Irish Nationalist poet Alice Milligan made a direct reference to Urris in her poem "A song of Freedom":

On Urris of Inishowen,
As I went up the mountain side,
The brook that came leaping down
Cried to me—for joy it cried;
And when from off the summit far
I looked o’er land and water wide,
I was more joyous than the brook
That met me on the mountain side.

=== Folklore ===
==== The Lost Piper ====
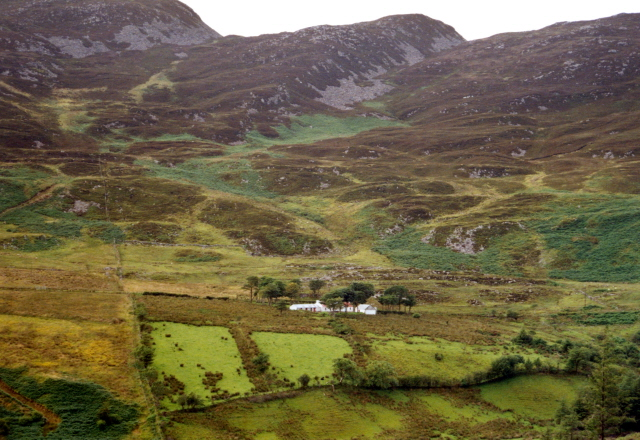
Hills in Urris

Binion Hill is associated with the Legend of the "lost piper". At the foot of the hill there is a cave known as Poll an Phiobaire (the piper's cave), which according to local tradition has no end. One day a piper heard that the cave contained a crock of gold. He entered the cave playing "Girls will be old women before I return". According to the legend, he disappeared in the cave but on occasions it is still possible to hear him playing at the mouth of the cave.

==== Cunning Fox of Urris ====
Another folktale tells the story of Urris men encountering a lifeless fox on the shore. Believing in the fox's magical tongue, they set out to acquire it but found that it had mysteriously vanished upon their return. Unbeknownst to them, the fox had cleverly played dead and escaped to Fanad. The fox takes refuge in the Urris hills, wreaking havoc by preying on lambs and consistently outwitting the locals and their dogs. After unsuccessful attempts to capture the fox, the Urris men uncover its secret escape route. A watcher stationed atop a hill observed the fox swinging into a hidden opening within the hill. Armed with this knowledge, the Urris men equip themselves with a saw to sever the branch at a critical moment. During the next chase, the fox escapes towards the hill, but to its demise, the branch has been cut, causing it to fall and meet its end.

== See also ==
- List of towns and villages in Ireland
