= List of shipwrecks in May 1839 =

The list of shipwrecks in May 1839 includes ships sunk, foundered, wrecked, grounded, or otherwise lost during May 1839.

== 1 May ==
List of shipwrecks: 1 May 1839
Ship	State	Description
Ann and Susan	United Kingdom	The ship was driven ashore at Dublin.
Hellechina	Netherlands	The ship was driven ashore near Brixsey Point, Glamorgan, United Kingdom. She was on a voyage from Cardiff, Glamorgan to Rotterdam, South Holland.
Parmelia	United Kingdom	The ship was severely damaged by fire at Plymouth, Devon. She was consequently condemned.
Preceptor	United Kingdom	The ship ran aground at Boulmer, Northumberland. she was later refloated.

== 2 May ==
List of shipwrecks: 2 May 1839
Ship	State	Description
Ann	United Kingdom	The ship ran ashore near Sunderland, County Durham. She was later refloated.
Orion	Hamburg	The ship departed from Matanzas, Cuba for Hamburg. No further trace, presumed foundered with the loss of all hnads.
Pegasus	United Kingdom	The paddle steamer struck rocks off St. Monance, Fife and was beached. All on board were rescued. She was on a voyage from Hull to Leith, Lothian. Pegasus was later refloated, repaired and returned to service.
Squirrel	United Kingdom	The ship ran ashore near Sunderland. She was later refloated.
Successful	United Kingdom	The ship ran ashore near Sunderland. She was later refloated.
Tiberius	United Kingdom	The ship ran aground at Egremont, Cumberland. She was on a voyage from Liverpool, Lancashire to Boston, Massachusetts, United States. Tiberius was later refloated.

== 3 May ==
List of shipwrecks: 3 May 1839
Ship	State	Description
Hope	United Kingdom	The ship was driven ashore at Flamborough Head, Yorkshire. She was later refloated.

== 4 May ==
List of shipwrecks: 4 May 1839
Ship	State	Description
Albertina	United Kingdom	The ship was wrecked at the entrance to Belfast Lough. Her crew were rescued.
Earl of Durham	United Kingdom	The ship ran aground on the Haisborough Sands, in the North Sea off the coast of Norfolk. She was on a voyage from Sunderland, County Durham to London. Earl of Durham was refloated and resumed her voyage.
Forsaget	Norway	The ship ran aground on the Pampas. She was on a voyage from Brevik to Amsterdam, North Holland.
Luna	United Kingdom	The ship ran aground at Helsingør, Denmark. She was on a voyage from Memel, Prussia to Dublin. Luna was refloated and resumed her voyage.

== 5 May ==
List of shipwrecks: 5 May 1839
Ship	State	Description
Amos	United Kingdom	The ship ran aground on the Foreness Rock, off Margate, Kent. She was on a voyage from Newcastle upon Tyne, Northumberland to St. Leonards-on-Sea, Sussex. Amos was refloated the next day and taken into Margate.
Bilbao	United Kingdom	The ship was driven ashore at Flamborough Head, Yorkshire. She was refloated and proceeded on her voyage.
Catherine Boland	United Kingdom	The ship ran aground on the Hook Sand, off Margate. She was on a voyage from Gloucester to London. She was refloated the next day and resumed her voyage.
Rocket	United Kingdom	The ship was wrecked in La Poile Bay. She was on a voyage from Portsmouth, Hampshire to Miramichi, New Brunswick, British North America.

== 6 May ==
List of shipwrecks: 6 May 1839
Ship	State	Description
Arab	United Kingdom	The ship ran aground on the Spaniard Sand, in the North Sea. she was on a voyage from London to Liverpool, Lancashire. Arab was refloated and taken into Whitstable, Kent.
Providence	United Kingdom	The ship ran aground on the Nore and was damaged. She was on a voyage from Selby, Yorkshire to London. Providence was refloated and taken into Sheerness, Kent.
Regina	United Kingdom	The ship foundered in Riga Bay due to ice.
Velatura	United Kingdom	The ship was run ashore near Flamborough Head, Yorkshire. She was on a voyage from London to Sunderland, County Durham. Velatura was later refloated.

== 7 May ==
List of shipwrecks: 7 May 1839
Ship	State	Description
Europe	United Kingdom	The ship was driven ashore and subsequently wrecked at Deal, New Jersey, United States. She was on a voyage from Liverpool, Lancashire to New York.
Jane	United Kingdom	The ship ran aground on the Pole Sand, in the English Channel. She was on a voyage from London to Starcross, Devon. Jane was refloated and taken into Exmouth, Devon.
Rambler	United Kingdom	The ship was driven ashore at Ostend, West Flanders, Belgium. She was on a voyage from Trinidad to Ostend. Rambler was later refloated and taken into Ostend.

== 9 May ==
List of shipwrecks: 9 May 1839
Ship	State	Description
Ann	United Kingdom	The ship was driven ashore and severely damaged at Bangor, County Down.
Boyne	United Kingdom	The ship was driven ashore at Drogheda, County Louth. She was on a voyage from Ardrossan, Ayrshire to Drogheda.
Despatch	United Kingdom	The ship was driven ashore and severely damaged at Sunderland, County Durham. She was on a voyage from Sunderland to Arundel, Sussex.
Indian	United Kingdom	The ship ran aground in the Humber. She was on a voyage from Hull to India. Indian was refloated and resumed her voyage.
Jane	United Kingdom	The ship sprang a leak and foundered in the Irish Sea off the coast of County Louth. She was on a voyage from Bangor to Newcastle upon Tyne, Northumberland.

== 10 May ==
List of shipwrecks: 10 May 1839
Ship	State	Description
Cleopatra	United Kingdom	The brig was wrecked on the Long Sand or Kentish Knock, in the North Sea off the coast of Kent. She was on a voyage from Hamburg to Newfoundland, British North America.
Clio	United Kingdom	The ship was driven ashore at Birchington, Kent.
Dee	United Kingdom	The ship was wrecked on Key Britton. Her crew were rescued. She was on a voyage from Jamaica to Trinidad.
Diligence	United Kingdom	The ship was driven ashore in Swanage Bay.
Earl of Errol	United Kingdom	The ship was driven ashore at Harwich, Essex. She was on a voyage from Calais, France to Newcastle upon Tyne, Northumberland. Earl of Errol was refloated and taken into Harwich.
Eleanor	United Kingdom	The ship was driven ashore at Poole, Dorset.
Elizabeth	United Kingdom	The ship was driven ashore and wrecked at Almonknash, Glamorgan. Her crew were rescued.
Five Friends	United Kingdom	The ship was driven ashore near Wexford. She was on a voyage from Dundalk, County Louth to Kinlough, County Leitrim.
Free Briton	United Kingdom	The ship was driven ashore and wrecked near Wainfleet, Lincolnshire.
Goodwill	United Kingdom	The ship was driven ashore in Swanage Bay.
Grace	United Kingdom	The ship ran aground on the Goodwick Sands, in the Bristol Channel. She was on a voyage from Bangor to Southampton, Hampshire.
Goodwill	United Kingdom	The ship was driven ashore in Swanage Bay.
Hope	United Kingdom	The ship was driven ashore at Weymouth, Dorset. Her crew were rescued.
James	United Kingdom	The ship was driven ashore at Poole.
John Stafford	United Kingdom	The ship was driven ashore and wrecked near Blakeney, Norfolk. She was on a voyage from Sunderland, County Durham to London.
Juno	(United Kingdom of Great Britain and Ireland) Guernsey	The ship was driven ashore at Weymouth. Her crew were rescued.
Nancy	United Kingdom	The ship was driven ashore at Poole.
Néréide	French Navy	The Artémise-class frigate ran aground at Galveston, Republic of Texas. She was refloated with assistance from Zavala (Texas Navy).
New Recovery	United Kingdom	The ship was driven ashore at Poole.
Sarah	United Kingdom	The ship was wrecked at "Paiba", Brazil. Her crew were rescued.
Trial	United Kingdom	The ship was driven ashore at Poole.

== 11 May ==
List of shipwrecks: August 1839
Ship	State	Description
Catherine	United Kingdom	The ship foundered in the Atlantic Ocean. Her crew were rescued by Druid (United Kingdom). Catherine was on a voyage from Newport, Monmouthshire to Cork.
Fairy	(United Kingdom of Great Britain and Ireland) New South Wales	The coaster, a cutter, ran aground at the mouth of the Macleay River and was wrecked.
Frau Heinke	Netherlands	The schuyt was wrecked on the Gunfleet Sand, in the North Sea off the coast of Essex, United Kingdom. Her crew were rescued by the smack Fair Traveller (United Kingdom), but the captain of that ship was drowned in the rescue attempt.
Little John	United Kingdom	The ship ran aground at Bridlington, Yorkshire and was severely damaged. She was on a voyage from Great Yarmouth, Norfolk to Bridlington.
Trial	(United Kingdom of Great Britain and Ireland) New South Wales	The coaster, a cutter, ran aground and sank at the mouth of the McLeay River.

== 12 May ==
List of shipwrecks: 12 May 1839
Ship	State	Description
Alexandra	Russia	The ship was wrecked near Karlskrona. Her crew were rescued. She was on a voyage from Liverpool, Lancashire, United Kingdom to Saint Petersburg.

== 13 May ==
List of shipwrecks: 13 May 1839
Ship	State	Description
Advance	United Kingdom	The brig ran aground on the Gunfleet Sand, in the North Sea off the coast of Essex. She was later refloated and taken into Harwich, Essex.
Edward Quesnel	United States	The ship was wrecked on Long Island, New York with the loss of eight of her crew.

== 14 May ==
List of shipwrecks: 14 May 1839
Ship	State	Description
New Leeds	United Kingdom	The sloop struck the West Rocks, Harwich, Essex and sank. She was on a voyage from Selby, Yorkshire to London. New Leeds was refloated on 15 May and taken into Harwich in a severely damaged condition.
Perseverance	United Kingdom	The ship was wrecked on the east coast of Jamaica. She was on a voyage from Newcastle upon Tyne, Northumberland to Jamaica and British Honduras.
Sarah	United Kingdom	The ship sprang a leak and was beached 4 nautical miles (7.4 km) west of Littlehampton, Sussex. She was on a voyage from Plymouth, Devon to London. Following repairs, Sarah was refloated the next day and resumed her voyage.

== 15 May ==
List of shipwrecks: 15 May 1839
Ship	State	Description
Aliquis	United Kingdom	The ship was wrecked on a reef in the Torres Straits, off Cape York, New South Wales. All on board were rescued by Argyle (United Kingdom) and she was set afire. Aliquis was on a voyage from Sydney, New South Wales to Calcutta, India.

== 17 May ==
List of shipwrecks: 17 May 1839
Ship	State	Description
Eliza	United Kingdom	The ship was wrecked on the Shipwash Sand, in the North Sea off the coast of Suffolk.

== 18 May ==
List of shipwrecks: 18 May 1839
Ship	State	Description
Aide-de-Camp	United Kingdom	The ship was wrecked on Brier Island, Nova Scotia, British North America with the loss of fifteen lives. She was on a voyage from Londonderry to Saint John, New Brunswick, British North America.
Janet	United Kingdom	The schooner was cast ashore on Poland Strand, Dunaff Head, County Donegal, Ireland (Killala, County Mayo for Liverpool, with oats) and became a total loss.

== 19 May ==
List of shipwrecks: 19 May 1839
Ship	State	Description
Andromache	(United Kingdom of Great Britain and Ireland) New South Wales	The ship was driven ashore at Miller's Point. She was refloated the next day.
Eliza	United Kingdom	The abandoned wreck was discovered in the North Sea by the pilot cutter John and Mary (United Kingdom) and was beached at Easton Bavents, Suffolk.
Thomas and Mary	United Kingdom	The ship ran aground and was damaged at Campbeltown, Argyllshire. She was on a voyage from Ipswich, Suffolk to Campbeltown.
West	United Kingdom	The ship was abandoned in the Atlantic Ocean 100 nautical miles (190 km) off Belize City, British Honduras. Her crew were rescued. She was on a voyage from British Honduras to Bristol, Gloucestershire.

== 20 May ==
List of shipwrecks: 20 May 1839
Ship	State	Description
Swan	United Kingdom	The ship was driven ashore and wrecked in Caernarvon Bay. Her crew were rescued.

== 21 May ==
List of shipwrecks: 21 May 1839
Ship	State	Description
Juno	United Kingdom	The ship ran aground off Helsingør, Denmark. She was on a voyage from Danzig to Liverpool, Lancashire. Juno was later refloated and resumed her voyage.
Socrates	Kingdom of Sardinia	The ship was wrecked on Fars Point, Sicily. She was on a voyage from the Black Sea to Genoa.

== 22 May ==
List of shipwrecks: 22 May 1839
Ship	State	Description
Navarino	United Kingdom	The barque was driven ashore and wrecked at Petit-Métis, Lower Canada, British North America. All 28 people on board were rescued. Navarino was refloated in mid-July and taken into "Cul-de-Sac".

== 23 May ==
List of shipwrecks: 23 May 1839
Ship	State	Description
Navarino	United Kingdom	The ship was driven ashore and wrecked at Métis, Lower Canada, British North America. Twenty passengers and crew were rescued. She was on a voyage from Plymouth, Devon to Quebec City, Lower Canada.
Palemon	France	The ship was wrecked on the Cruz del Padre, Cuba.
San Augustin	Spain	The ship was wrecked on the Cruz del Padre.

== 24 May ==
List of shipwrecks: 24 May 1839
Ship	State	Description
Elizabeth	United Kingdom	The ship ran aground in the Elbe near Blankenese. She was on a voyage from Hamburg to Hull, Yorkshire.

== 25 May ==
List of shipwrecks: 25 May 1839
Ship	State	Description
Havana Packet	Netherlands	The ship struck Cape Lookout Shoal and was consequently abandoned. Her crew were rescued. She was on a voyage from Havana, Cuba to Amsterdam, North Holland.
Neptune	United Kingdom	The ship was driven ashore at Helsingør, Denmark. She was on a voyage from Memel, Prussia to Hull, Yorkshire. Neptune was refloated the next day and resumed her voyage.

== 26 May ==
List of shipwrecks: 26 May 1839
Ship	State	Description
Antelope	United Kingdom	The ship ran aground on the Storkholm Reef, in the Baltic Sea. She was on a voyage from Pärnu, Russia to London. Antelope was refloated on 28 May and resumed her voyage.
Minerva	United Kingdom	The ship ran aground on the South Stack and was damaged. She was on a voyage from Liverpool, Lancashire to Londonderry. Minerva was refloated and put back to Liverpool.

== 27 May ==
List of shipwrecks: 27 May 1839
Ship	State	Description
Jahde	Bremen	The ship was driven ashore on Bornholm, Denmark. Her crew were rescued. She was on a voyage from Riga, Russia to Bremen.
Louisia	Norway	The ship was driven ashore and damaged at Calais, France. She was on a voyage from Christiania to Calais. Louisa was later refloated and taken into Calais.

== 28 May ==
List of shipwrecks: 28 May 1839
Ship	State	Description
Fenwick	United Kingdom	The ship was driven ashore at Flamborough Head, Yorkshire. She was on a voyage from London to South Shields, County Durham. Fenwick was later refloated and resumed her voyage.

== 29 May ==
List of shipwrecks: 29 May 1839
Ship	State	Description
Dove	(United Kingdom of Great Britain and Ireland) New South Wales	The cutter was driven ashore at Wollongong. Her crew survived.
Hero	United Kingdom	The ship was driven ashore at Battery Point, Sydney, New South Wales. She was on a voyage from Sydney to Batavia, Netherlands East Indies. Hero was later refloated; she resumed her voyage on 6 June.
Industry	(United Kingdom of Great Britain and Ireland) New South Wales	The cutter was driven ashore at Wollongong. Her crew survived.
Maid of the Mill	(United Kingdom of Great Britain and Ireland) New South Wales	The schooner was driven ashore and wrecked at Kiama. Her crew survived.

== 30 May ==
List of shipwrecks: 30 May 2017
Ship	State	Description
Ebenezer	United Kingdom	The ship ran aground on the Goodwin Sands, Kent. She was on a voyage from Newcastle upon Tyne, Northumberland to Exeter, Devon. She was refloated and resumed her voyage.

== 31 May ==
List of shipwrecks: 31 May 1839
Ship	State	Description
Io	United Kingdom	The ship was wrecked at Trois-Pistoles, Lower Canada, British North America. She was on a voyage from Liverpool, Lancashire to Quebec City, Lower Canada. Io was refloated in early August and towed into Quebec City.

== Unknown date ==
List of shipwrecks: Unknown date in May 1839
Ship	State	Description
Ann	United Kingdom	The ship was driven ashore and severely damaged at Bangor.
Ann	(United Kingdom of Great Britain and Ireland) New South Wales	The coaster ran aground at the mouth of the Macleay River.
Betsey and Sara	Netherlands	The ship was wrecked west of the mouth of the Bushman's River, Africa before 9 May with the loss of eighteen of her crew. She was on a voyage from Batavier, Netherlands East Indies to Amsterdam, North Holland.
Bridgetown	United Kingdom	The ship was driven ashore on Green Island. She was on a voyage from Waterford to Quebec City, Lower Canada, British North America.
Brilliant	United States	The brig was wrecked in Poverty Bay.
Caroline	United Kingdom	The ship was wrecked on Green Island before 20 April. She was on a voyage from Waterford to Quebec City.
Catherine	United Kingdom	The brig was abandoned in the Atlantic Ocean before 18 May.
John and Mary	United Kingdom	The ship foundered in the Dogger Bank on or before 21 May.
John McLellan	United Kingdom	The ship was driven ashore and wrecked in the Hooghly River, India before 9 May.
Leopard	United States	The ship was abandoned in the Atlantic Ocean before 19 May.
Maida	United Kingdom	The ship was abandoned in the Atlantic Ocean before 13 May. Her crew were rescued. She was on a voyage from Hull, Yorkshire to New York, United States.
№ 12	(Ottoman Empire) Egyptian Navy	The ship-of-the-line ran aground at Alexandria. She was later refloated.
USS Sea Gull	United States Navy	The schooner, a former pilot boat departed Orange Harbor for Valparaiso, Chile, but on 8 May lost contact with USS Flying Fish and vanished. Lost with all hands.
Tennessee	United States	The ship ran aground on French Key. She was on a voyage from Bordeaux, Gironde, France to New Orleans, Louisiana. Tennessee was later refloated and taken into Key West, Florida Territory, where she was condemned.
Welvaart	Hamburg	The ship was lost whilst on a voyage from Hamburg to Liebau, Prussia and Riga, Russia. Her crew were rescued.
Zoe	France	The ship was abandoned in the North Sea off Ameland, Friesland, Netherlands with the loss of a crew member. She was on a voyage from Cette, Hérault to Kronstadt, Russia.
