= Drumfries railway station =

Railway station in Ireland

Drumfries

General information
- Location: Drumfries, County Donegal; Ireland
- Coordinates: 55.1968°N 7.3956°W

History
- Original company: Londonderry and Lough Swilly Railway
- Post-grouping: Londonderry and Lough Swilly Railway

Key dates
- 1 July 1901: Station opens
- 2 December 1935: Station closes
Location
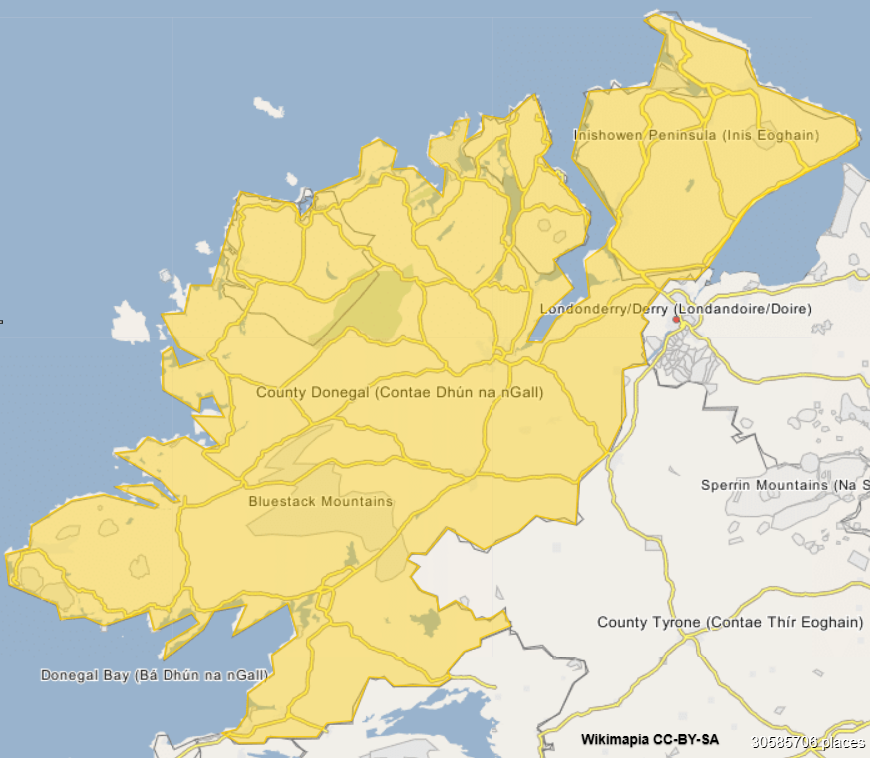
- Location within County Donegal Location within Ireland

Drumfries railway station served Drumfries in County Donegal, Ireland.

The station opened on 1 July 1901 on the Londonderry and Lough Swilly Railway line from Londonderry Graving Dock to Carndonagh.

The old station house now serves as a public house and guest accommodation.

It closed for passengers on 2 December 1935.

== Routes ==
| Preceding station | Disused railways | Following station |
|---|---|---|
| Kinnego Halt | Londonderry and Lough Swilly Railway; Londonderry- Carndonagh | Meendoran Halt |
