= Meendoran Halt railway station =

Railway station in Ireland

Meendoran Halt

General information
- Location: Meendoran, County Donegal; Ireland

History
- Original company: Londonderry and Lough Swilly Railway
- Post-grouping: Londonderry and Lough Swilly Railway

Key dates
- 1 November 1929: Station opens
- 2 December 1935: Station closes
Location

Meendoran railway station served Meendoran in County Donegal, Ireland.

The station opened on 1 November 1929 on the Londonderry and Lough Swilly Railway line from Londonderry Graving Dock to Carndonagh.

It closed for passengers on 2 December 1935.

== Routes ==
Preceding station	Disused railways	Following station
Drumfries	Londonderry and Lough Swilly Railway; Londonderry- Carndonagh	Clonmany
