= Clonmany railway station =

Station in County Donegal, Ireland

Clonmany
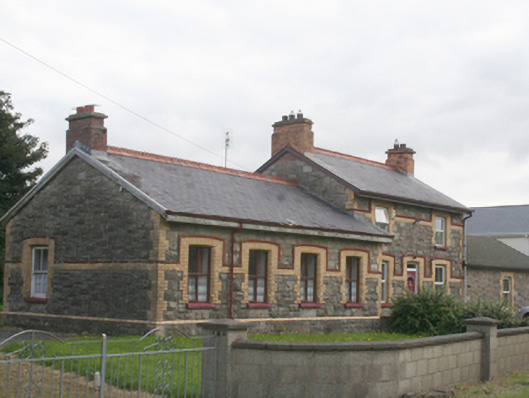
- Station building

General information
- Location: Clonmany, County Donegal; Ireland

History
- Original company: Londonderry and Lough Swilly Railway
- Post-grouping: Londonderry and Lough Swilly Railway

Key dates
- 1 July 1901: Station opens
- 2 December 1935: Station closes
Location

Clonmany railway station served Clonmany in County Donegal, Ireland.

The station opened on 1 July 1901 on the Londonderry and Lough Swilly Railway line from Londonderry Graving Dock to Carndonagh.

It closed for passengers on 2 December 1935.

== History ==
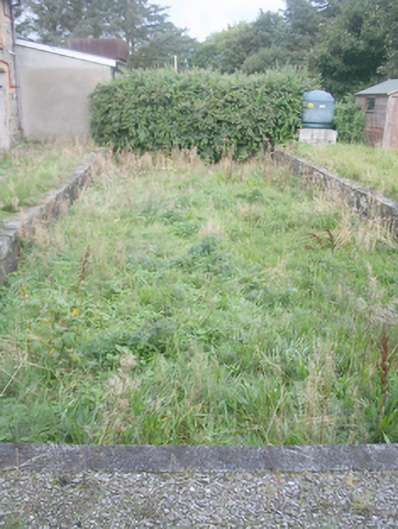
Remnants of railway platform

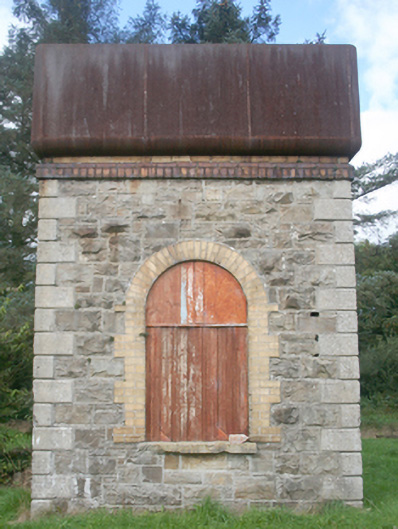
Water tower at Clonmany station

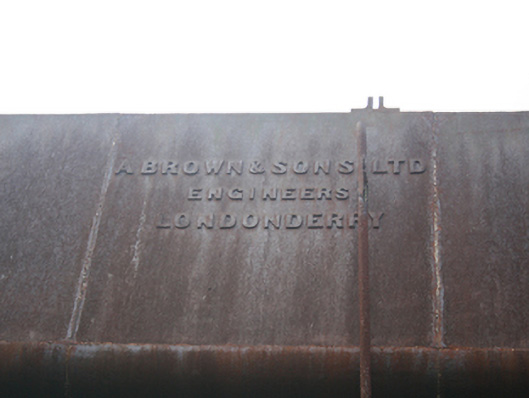
Writing on water tower

The station played an important role in transporting troops to several British Army bases that were situated in the vicinity of Clonmany. During the first world war, the Glenfield Training Camp was opened in Straid, just outside the village. Leenan and Dunree Forts were also nearby. During the War of Independence, in July 1921, railway workers refused to transport British Soldiers. The soldiers were removed from the train and sent back to Leenan fort.

A man from Rooskey - Hugh O'Donnell - was convicted in January 1925 of stealing 9 stone of coal from the railway company. In his defence, O'Donnell said that he thought that the coal belonged to the British Military, who at the time, still occupied two forts nearby in Leenan and Dunree. O'Donnell was found guilty and sentenced to one month's hard labour.

In January 1935, a man named William McLaughlin, hailing from the Isle of Doagh, was apprehended at the railway station for carrying 3 1/2 pounds of yeast without a permit. At that time, the underground distilling of alcohol played a significant role in the local economy. To possess substantial quantities of yeast, one needed an official authorization. Otherwise, the assumption was that such yeast was intended for the production of Poteen. Consequently, McLaughlin was found guilty and fined £20.

== The case of William Gubbin ==
In May 1901, local MP Mr. O'Doherty raised a parliamentary question regarding the search of William Gubbins' home in Clonmany. The police conducted the search in hopes of finding a stolen wheelbarrow that belonged to the railway company and was believed to be in Gubbins' possession. Notably, Gubbins was an evicted tenant, and the search warrant used was issued by his former landlord, Mr. John Loughrey, who also served as a local magistrate.

However, it was later revealed that Mr. Loughrey did not sign the warrant until ten days after the search took place. The wheelbarrow was eventually found, albeit with its owner's name erased. The defense argued that the wheelbarrow had been borrowed, leading to the dismissal of the case. During the trial, Gubbins expressed his belief that not only should the case be dismissed, but those responsible for the search should also face consequences.

In response to the parliamentary inquiry, the Attorney-General for Ireland provided a vague explanation. He stated that the wheelbarrow had gone missing from a railway contractor, who reported the incident to the police. The constable, believing the contractor's statement to be true, obtained a search warrant. However, the attorney general did not clarify the timeline of events or address whether the warrant was signed after the search took place.

Mr. O'Doherty persisted in seeking further clarification in Parliament, specifically regarding the sequence of events leading to the issuance of the search warrant. The Attorney-General, on the other hand, argued that he had already addressed the matter by providing details about the stolen wheelbarrow. This elicited laughter from the audience. Mr. O'Doherty insisted that the Attorney-General had not adequately answered his question. The Speaker intervened, calling for order and decorum during the proceedings.

== Accidents ==
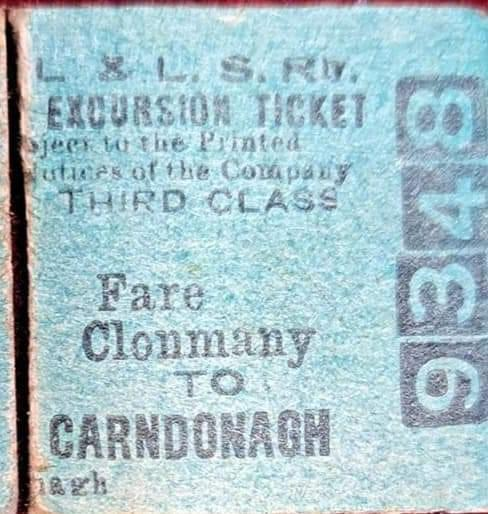
A railway ticket for travel between Clonmany and Carndonagh

On 20 July 1903 Michael Quigley, a porter at Clonmany station, broke his shin after his foot was caught between the platform and a train carriage footboard. Quigley sued the Londonderry and Lough Swilley Railway company for damages. In January 1904 he was awarded £70 damages with costs by the Lifford Quarter Sessions.

On July 26th 1906 train driver Joseph Cannon was standing on the lower step of his engine. While he was performing maintenance, he was struck by a culvert railing and thrown from the train. The train was traveling at a high speed between Clonmany and Carndonagh. The guard immediately activated the brake, and the fireman shut off the steam. Cannon was discovered caught in the railings with a broken wrist and serious injuries to his leg. He was quickly transported to Carndonagh Hospital for treatment.

In August 1909, a carriage of train from Clonmany to Buncrana caught fire. The train was chartered for passengers returning from the Clonmany horse races. On arrival at Buncrana, passengers reported that the bottom of a carriage was burning freely. The train was quickly evacuated and moved to a siding and the fire was put out.

In February 1928, a bull escaped after being loaded onto a wagon, where it was due to be transported from Clonmany to the Carndonagh fair. The animal ran along the platform, frightening passengers waiting to get on the train. It then ran along the railway track and escaped onto the main street running through the village, causing panic among school children. Despite efforts of the police and locals, the animal escaped deep into the countryside.

On 30 August 1928 a train carriage jumped the rails while it was being shunted through the station. The carriage was full of passengers who had just attended the Clonmany races. Although no-one was injured, the carriages were evacuated.

In July 1933, a horse bolted as it was being used to load timber onto a railway carriage, causing planks to be scattered in all directions. The horse galloped into the village and was eventually caught by a local policeman.

== Architecture ==
After the line was closed, the station building was converted into a house. In 2008, it was listed in the national inventory of architectural heritage. Remnants of the platform and the water tower are still visible.

== Routes ==
Preceding station	Disused railways	Following station
Meendoran Halt	Londonderry and Lough Swilly Railway; Londonderry- Carndonagh	Ballyliffin
