= Rashenny railway station =

Railway station in Ireland

General information
- Location: Rashenny, County Donegal; Ireland

History
- Original company: Londonderry and Lough Swilly Railway
- Post-grouping: Londonderry and Lough Swilly Railway

Key dates
- 1 July 1901: Station opens
- 2 December 1935: Station closes
Location

Rashenny railway station served Rashenny in County Donegal, Ireland.

The station opened on 1 July 1901 on the Londonderry and Lough Swilly Railway line from Londonderry Graving Dock to Carndonagh.

It closed for passengers on 2 December 1935.

== Routes ==
Preceding station	Disused railways	Following station
Ballyliffin	Londonderry and Lough Swilly Railway; Londonderry- Carndonagh	Carndonagh Halt
