= Crossconnell =

Townland in County Donegal, Ireland

- Townland
- Location within Ireland
- Coordinates: 55°16′31″N 7°26′35″W
- Country: Ireland
- Province: Ulster
- County: County Donegal

Area
  - Total: 115 ha (284 acres)

Crossconnell (Irish: Crois Chonaill) is a townland in the Urris Valley, located in the north-west corner of the Inishowen Peninsula in Ireland. It is in the Electoral Division of Dunaff, in Civil Parish of Clonmany, in the Barony of Inishowen East, in County Donegal. It borders the following other townlands: Binnion to the east; Straid to the south; Tullagh to the West. It contains the subtownland of Crocklacky.

Crossconnell has an area of 115.14 hectares (284 acres, 2 roods and 4 perches).

== Etymology ==
The name Crossconnell is from the Irish: Crois Chonaill meaning "Cross of Connell".

== History ==
Crossconnell was mapped in the Parsons Hollar Map of 1662, albeit under the name Rosconnel. The townland is referenced in Griffith Valuation, a land valuation survey prepared in the 1850s. A total of 21 households are recorded.

On 28 May 1892, Crossconnell experienced heavy flooding after an unusual rainfall. The storm led to a heavy loss of crops and livestock.

== Places of interest ==
Crossconnell National School - A good example of a two-classroom rural national school, the school was built in 1928, using a standard plan adapted to local conditions. It was closed in the late 1960s, following a decline in the rural population.

Bunacrick traditional thatched cottage - Located on the road between Clonmany and Urris, the house was constructed around 1820. It is an example of traditional architecture. The thatched roof uses latticed restraining ropes and cast-iron stays. The walls of the house are made of random rubble stone. Historical records from the Ordnance Survey first edition map of approximately 1837 confirm the presence of a house on the site.

== Gallery ==
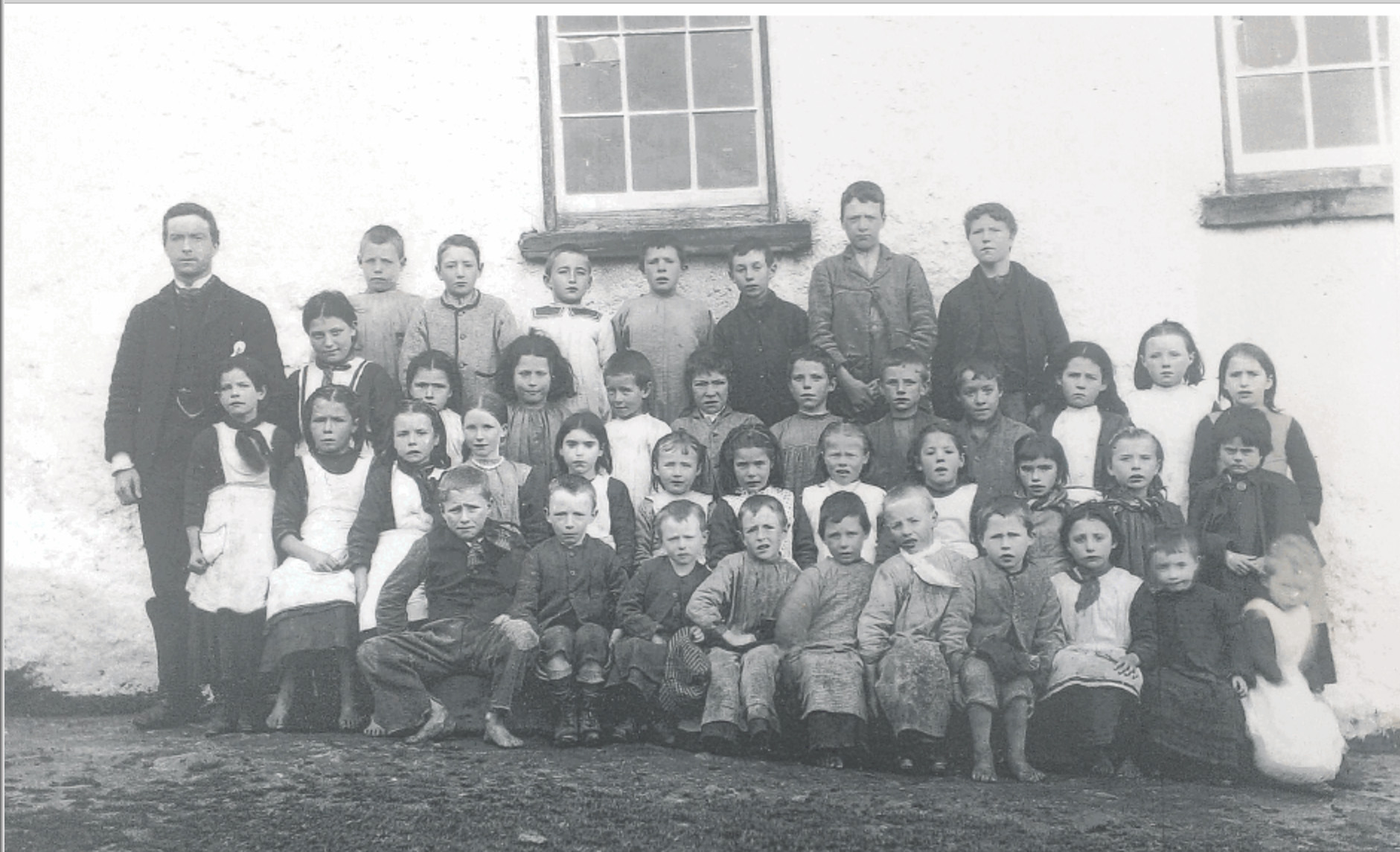
Crossconnell school, early 1900s

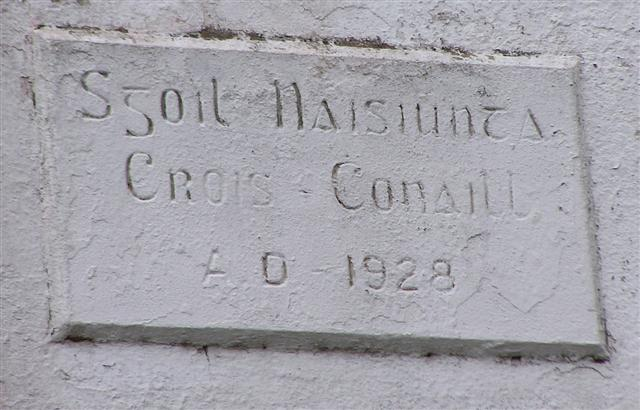
Plaque from Crossconnell school

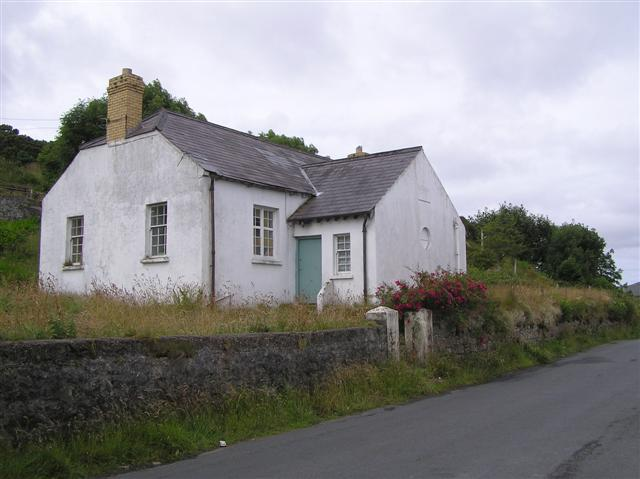
Crossconnell school, circa 2020
