= Ballyliffin railway station =

Former railway station in Ireland

Coordinates: 55.2787°N 7.3935°W

General information
- Location: Ballyliffin, County Donegal; Ireland

History
- Opened: 1 July 1901
- Closed: 2 December 1935
- Original company: Londonderry and Lough Swilly Railway
- Post-grouping: Londonderry and Lough Swilly Railway

Services
Preceding station	Londonderry and Lough Swilly Railway	Following station
Clonmany	Londonderry- Carndonagh	Rashenny
Location
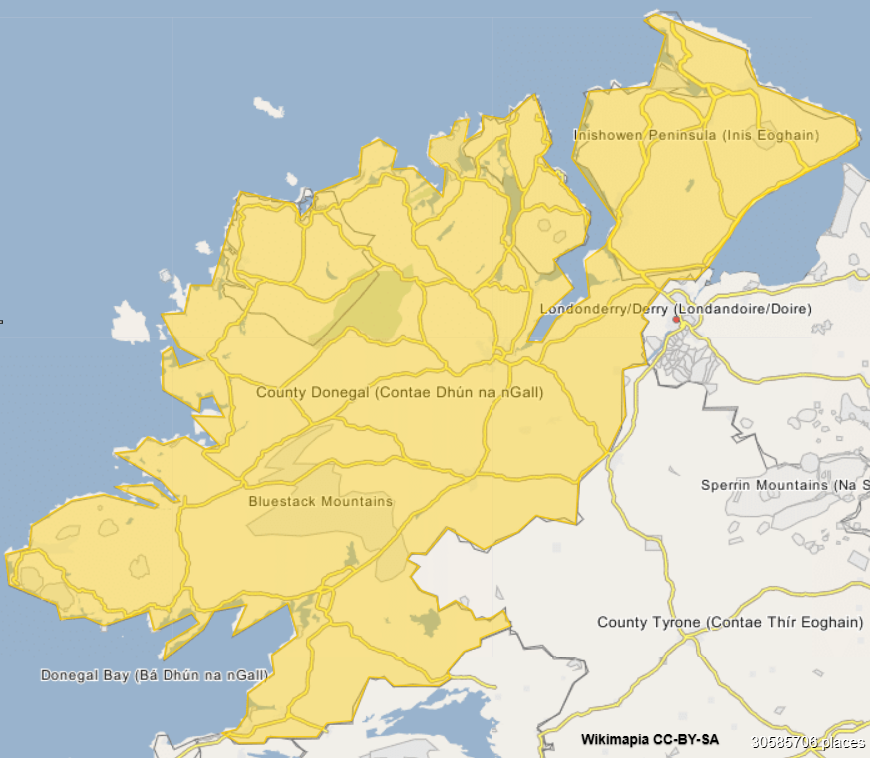
- Location within County Donegal Location within Ireland

Ballyliffin railway station served Ballyliffin in County Donegal, Ireland. Built by the Londonderry & Lough Swilly Railway Company, the railway station was in use from 1901 to 1935.

== History ==
The station opened on 1 July 1901 on the Londonderry and Lough Swilly Railway line from Londonderry Graving Dock to Carndonagh. The station closed for passengers on 2 December 1935. It is now privately owned.

== Architecture ==
According to its entry in the National Inventory of Architectural Heritage (NIAH), the building is a "typical example of the railway stations along the Tooban to Carndonagh line". It has a pitched slate roof, red brick chimneystacks, and yellow brick detailing. The NIAH entry states that it retains a number of "original features of interest", such as decorative clay ridge comb tiles and horned timber sash windows.
