= Carndonagh Halt railway station =

Railway station in County Donegal, Ireland

Carndoagh Halt railway station

General information
- Location: Carndonagh, County Donegal; Ireland
- Coordinates: 55.268538°N 7.286721°W
- Elevation: 45 ft (14 m)

History
- Original company: Londonderry and Lough Swilly Railway
- Post-grouping: Londonderry and Lough Swilly Railway

Key dates
- 1 November 1929: Station opens
- 2 December 1935: Station closes
Location

Carndoagh Halt railway station was a rural station located in the townland of Carndoagh, 1.5 miles north west of Carndonagh in County Donegal, Ireland.

The station opened on 1 November 1929 on the Londonderry and Lough Swilly Railway line from Londonderry Graving Dock to Carndonagh.

It closed for passengers on 2 December 1935.

== Routes ==
Preceding station	Disused railways	Following station
Rashenny	Londonderry and Lough Swilly Railway; Londonderry- Carndonagh	Carndonagh
