= Kinnea =

- Townland
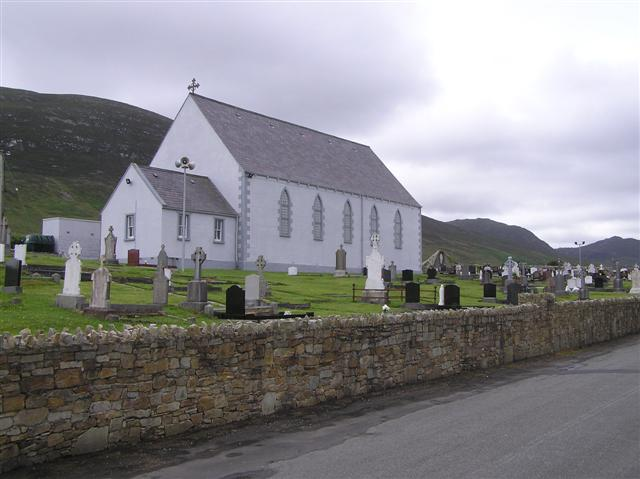
- Catholic church at Kinnea

- Location within Ireland
- Coordinates: 55°16′25″N 7°28′11″W
- Country: Ireland
- Province: Ulster
- County: Donegal

Area
  - Total: 227.53 ha (562.23 acres)

Kinnea (Irish: Ceann Eich) is a townland in the Urris Valley, in the northwest corner of the Inishowen Peninsula in County Donegal, Ireland. It is in the Electoral Division of Dunaff, in the civil parish of Clonmany and the historical barony of Inishowen East. Kinnea borders the townlands of Dunaff to the west, Letter to the south, Straid to the south and Tullagh to the east. It has four subtownlands; Rockstown (Irish: Baile na Creige), Altnacullentra, Kindrohid (Irish: Ceann Droichid) and Crocknagee (Irish: Croc na gaoithe). Kinnea townland has an area of approximately 227.5 hectares (562 acres).

== Etymology ==
The name Kinnea is an anglicization of Ceann Eich, meaning 'horse's head'. The area is commonly known as Rockstown. This name was introduced in the 17th century by English settlers, which supplanted the much older Irish language name of Kinnea.

== History ==
The townland is not mentioned in the Civil Survey - a cadastral survey of landholdings in Ireland carried out in 1654–56, nor in the Down Survey of 1655. The townland is mapped in William Mc Crea's "A Map of County Donegal" published in 1801. It is also referenced in the Griffiths Valuation of the 1850s. The townland is also mentioned in the Irish census' of 1901 and 1911. In the 1860s, Rockstown is recorded as having a harbour.

Kinnea is mentioned the 1814 Statistical Account (Parochial Survey of Ireland). The Parochial Survey described the land ownership:

"A part of the lands of this Parish (Clonmany) belongs to the Bishop of Derry, and the remainder was the fee-simple estate of the Marquis of Donegal until the year 1810, when the townlands of Tullagh, Kinnea, Letter, Dunaff, and Urrismana, Leenan...were sold...to Sir Robert Harvey."

The survey also indicated that Arthur Chichester, MP owned a small villa in Roxtown (Kinnea).

During the 19th century, there was a coast-guard station in Kindrohid. It is marked on the maps used in the Griffiths Valuation.

=== Mid-19th century ===
The Great Famine, also known as the Great Hunger, was a devastating period in Irish history that occurred between 1845 and 1852. The famine was primarily caused by the failure of the potato crop, which was a staple food for the majority of the Irish population, especially the impoverished rural communities.

A three masted ship ran around in Rockstown bay in October 1860. The crew abandoned the ship before it broke up.

=== Rural unrest in the late 19th century ===
Land ownership in Kinnea and the surrounding valley of Urris was highly contentious, with landlords often issuing eviction notices to tenant farmers. These evictions sometimes led to violent confrontations between the bailiffs and local residents. Evictions of tenants in rent arrears was a relatively frequent occurrence, and efforts to remove people from their homes was met by protest. In January 1881, for example, four local men were charged with having engaged in a riot, of unlawful assembly and of assaulting a bailiff who had visited Kinnea to serve eviction notices. A crowd of 150 residents had confronted the bailiff and pelted him with snowballs and sods of turf. The police, who had accompanied the bailiff, identified the four accused men from the assembled crowd. The magistrates took a lenient view of the incident and dismissed the case.

=== Poitin production and possession ===
The Urris Valley and Rockstown previously had a noted association with the clandestine distillation and production of poitín. In August 1924, at Carndonagh District Court, a local man was prosecuted for harbouring poitín, found in his son's room during a neighborhood raid. Maintaining innocence, Doherty denied knowledge of the prohibited spirits. The presiding judge mitigated the penalty to the minimum prescribed by law.

=== Second World War ===
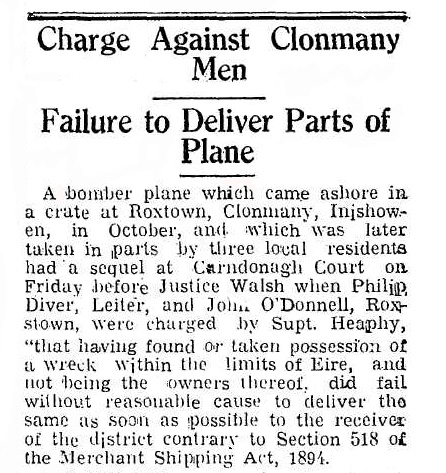
Newspaper account of a case in which several people were charged with failing to declare that a WW2 bomber had come ashore on Rockstown beach

In October 1940, a crate containing a bomber plane came ashore in a crate in Rockstown Bay. Three local men, Philip Diver, from Letter, John Devlin from Rockstown and John O'Donnell, from Rockstown found the crate, dismantled parts of the plane and used the wood and other items for construction materials. They were later arrested and charged under the Merchant Shipping Act 1894. They were subsequently found guilty and fined at Carndonagh Court.

=== Binion Head fishing disaster ===
On Friday, 17 August 1962, three fishermen from Rockstown drowned when their lobster boat hit submerged rocks and sank in calm seas off Binion Head. The three men were Patrick Doherty (aged 40), John McGilloway (aged 50) and his son, also called John McGilloway (aged 24).

The men had departed to go fishing in the morning and were expected to be back by early evening. Their boat was observed passing Binion at about 11 am. When the men failed to arrive by late evening, the alarm was raised. A search party was organised that evening and a lifeboat from Portrush was called to assist. On the Saturday, the shattered wreckage of part of the 25-foot boat washed ashore on Ballyliffin Strand, a few hundred yards from Binion Head. Over the next two days, wreckage from the boat washed ashore from Pollan beach to Binion, a distance of more than a mile.

The search continued over the weekend. On the Monday, frogmen from a Londonderry-based British naval unit found the bodies of John McGilloway Senior and his son. The keel of the boat with timber from the bow was beside the bodies. A week later, the body of Patrick Doherty was recovered. The following Tuesday, Royal Navy frogmen conducted another search where the bodies of John McGilloway and his son were found.

The divers also located the boat's engine on the seabed off Rockstown Harbor. A rope was entangled in the propeller, which according to the coroner "fouled the engine, causing the boat to drift and strike submerged rocks". The frogmen suggested that the rope was attached to a buoy from missing lobster pots. However, pieces of the wreckage were blackened which gave rise to an alternative theory that the boat was destroyed by an explosion on board. A relief fund was later established to support the families of the lost men.

=== Rockstown Bay currents ===
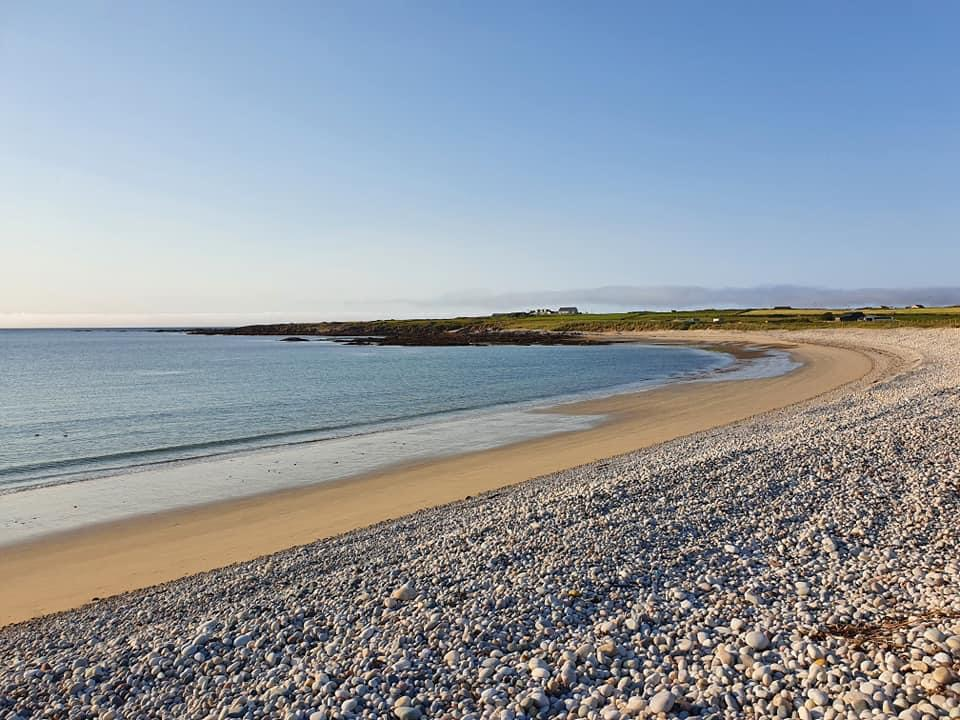
Rockstown Bay, looking at Tullagh

The sea currents around Rockstown Bay are extremely dangerous. In July 2013, a woman from Londonderry was found drowned on the bay. The search operation, lasting roughly four hours, involved four lifeboats, a helicopter, and shoreline search parties.

== Places of interest ==
- Raghtin Beg - A mountain 1,358 feet high
