= Dunaff =

Dunaff Dún Damh (Irish)
- Townland
- Location within Ireland
- Coordinates: 55°16′37″N 7°30′13″W
- Country: Ireland
- Province: Ulster
- County: Donegal

Area
  - Total: 526.72 ha (1,301.55 acres)

Dunaff (Irish: Dún Damh) is a townland in the Urris Valley, located in the North-West corner of the Inishowen Peninsula.

It is in the Electoral Division of Dunaff, in Civil Parish of Clonmany, in the Barony of Inishowen East, in County Donegal. It borders the following other townlands: Kinnea to the east; Lenan to the south; Letter to the east and Urrismenagh to the south. It has four subtownlands; Tirnasligo, Ballynacarla and Bulloor.

Dunaff has an area of 526.72 hectares (1,301.6 acres).

== History ==
Ireland's oldest Neolithic campsite is located in Dunaff Bay. It lies at the mouth of Loch Swilly, between the cliffs of Dunaff Head to the north and Lenan Head to the south. The site contained many early Irish Mesolithic artifacts, including unabraded flints comprising a few leaf-shaped flakes, blade-like flakes and a large amount of related Neolithic waste material. The location is regarded as an "industrial site" producing material associated with the so-called Early Larnian tradition. There is no evidence of a permanent settlement at the site.

In the early 20th century, Dunaff Head the location of a local regatta. Both sailing boats and rowing boats from local villages competed in races.

=== Fishing ===
During the 19th century, residents supplemented their income through fishing. A Royal Commission on the State of Irish Fishing, published in 1837, described the boats in Dunaff as being in "generally a very bad condition" with the "fishermen being too poor to keep (their boats) seaworthy".

=== Disasters at sea ===
The coastline around Dunaff is treacherous. As a consequence, the townland has a long history of accidents and disasters related to the sea.

- HMS Saldanah ran aground on the evening of 4 December 1811 with the loss of 253 lives.
- In January 1832, six fishermen were drowned off Dunaff Head. Their boat capsized after it was hit by a heavy wave.
- On 18 May 1839 the schooner Janet was wrecked near Dunaff Head, while sailing from Killala to Liverpool.
- In March 1841, the schooner Mary Hamilton struck the rocks around Dunaff Head, and foundered. The vessel was registered in Glasgow and was sailing from Liverpool to Donegal.
- On 2 April 1850, a ship called Mars sank off Dunaff head. All the crew were rescued.
- A fleet of fishing vessels set sail from Dunaff Bay in January 1890. The fleet encountered a storm and one of the boats foundered. The nine men on board were drowned.
- In April 1894, five survivors from the wreck of Ocean Witch arrived in an open boat at Dunaff Head. Captain Holden, the ship's mate and three seamen abandoned the schooner when it foundered off Eagle Island. The vessel was bound from Plymouth to Limerick.
- In March 1917, two local farmers William Kearney and Con Kelly were swept to sea while trying to recover pieces of wreckage from the rocks around Dunaff Head during a gale.
- In July 1957, the body of Thomas Porter of Inch Island was discovered in the sea near Dunaff. He was one of four fishermen who died when their boat was lost in a storm near Loch Swilley.
- In June 1975. twelve anglers were rescued by the Irish Navy, when their boat ran into trouble just off Dunaff Head.

=== Shell Explosion ===
On July 26, 1919, in Dunaff, thirteen-year-old Patrick McDonald, the son of farmer John McDonald, tragically lost his life in an accidental explosion. Patrick's fatal encounter was the result of a small shell that he had discovered and inadvertently used as a makeshift hammer. The explosion caused severe injuries, leading to the amputation of his right hand and forearm, as well as fracturing bones in his skull. Expert testimonies from Lieutenant Long of the Royal Garrison Artillery and Chief Gunner Frederick William Philmore from Lough Swilly Naval Base confirmed that the shell in question was a three-pounder of British origin.

=== Post Office Robbery ===
In January 1923, the Dunaff Post Office was robbed by three armed men. The robbers entered the premises and overpowered the occupants, taking away £100. Three local men were later arrested.

=== Poiten production ===
The relatively remote location of the townland provided significant cover for producers of illicit alcohol. In particular, the Dunaff hills were a major site of production. As a consequence, homes in the townland were subjected to regular raids by the authorities both before and after independence.

- In September 1926, the Garda seized 70 gallons of wash, an intermediate product of Poitin in a cave on Dunaff hill.
- During a routine patrol, in February 1927, Guards McKeon, Fox, and McLaughlin discovered a Poitin still on Dunaff Hill. Positioned on a ledge of a cliff facing the sea, they encountered a still and still-head. The guards descended halfway down the formidable 400-feet cliff face to reach the ledge. However, logistical constraints prevented them from bringing their find up the cliff. To ensure the permanent removal of the still, they dropped it into the sea.
- A Dunaff farmer by the name of Duffy was prosecuted in April 1928 for producing poitin.
- In July 1928, on Dunaff Hill, Sergeant Tuttle and Guards Hurley, Fox, and Clancy, based from Clonmany, stumbled upon a collection of illicit distillation equipment consisting of a still, still-head, and copper worm.

== Places of Interest ==
- Dunaff Hill (Irish: Cnoc Dhún Damh) - A mountain with an elevation of 210 meters (690 feet). Its coordinates are 55.2783° North and 7.5153° West. This hill is hemmed in by Dunaff Bay to the south and by Rocktown Bay to the north, which in turn creates the Dunaff Headland. This headland has a 4 kilometer stretch of very exposed coast line running its circumference to a high point of 220 meters.
- Bothanvarra - A 70m high chubby Matterhorn shaped sea stack that sits just beyond Dunaff head. Access to Bothanvarra is by 1.5 km sea passage from Rocktown Bay to the north or by descending the steep vegetated gully 500 meters to the south of the stack. Both methods of approach are quite dangerous and require a very calm sea state.
- Dunaff Head - A promontory that sits on the eastern entrance of Loch Swilly. The cliffs on the north side rise perpendicularly to a height of 600 feet.
