= Clonmany =

Village in County Donegal, Ireland

Clonmany Cluain Maine
- Village
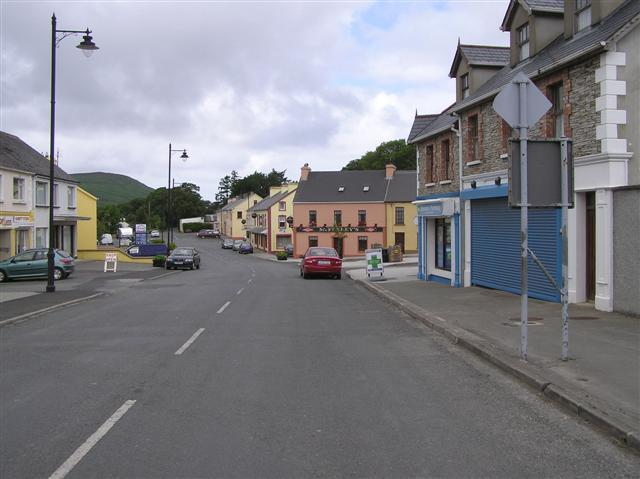
- Main Street

- Location in Ireland
- Coordinates: 55°15′45″N 7°24′45″W
- Country: Ireland
- Province: Ulster
- County: County Donegal

Government
  - Dáil Éireann: Donegal

Area
  - Total: 95.01 km^{2} (36.68 sq mi)

Population (2022)
  - Total: 569
- Time zone: UTC+0 (WET)
  - Summer (DST): UTC-1 (IST (WEST))
- Area codes: 074, +353 74
- Irish Grid Reference: C374463

Clonmany (Irish: Cluain Maine) is a village and civil parish in north-west Inishowen, in County Donegal, Ireland. The Urris valley to the west of Clonmany village was the last outpost of the Irish language in Inishowen. In the 19th century, the area was an important location for poitín distillation. Outside the village, there are a number of notable townlands, including Kinnea (Rockstown), Crossconnell, Dunaff, and Leenan.

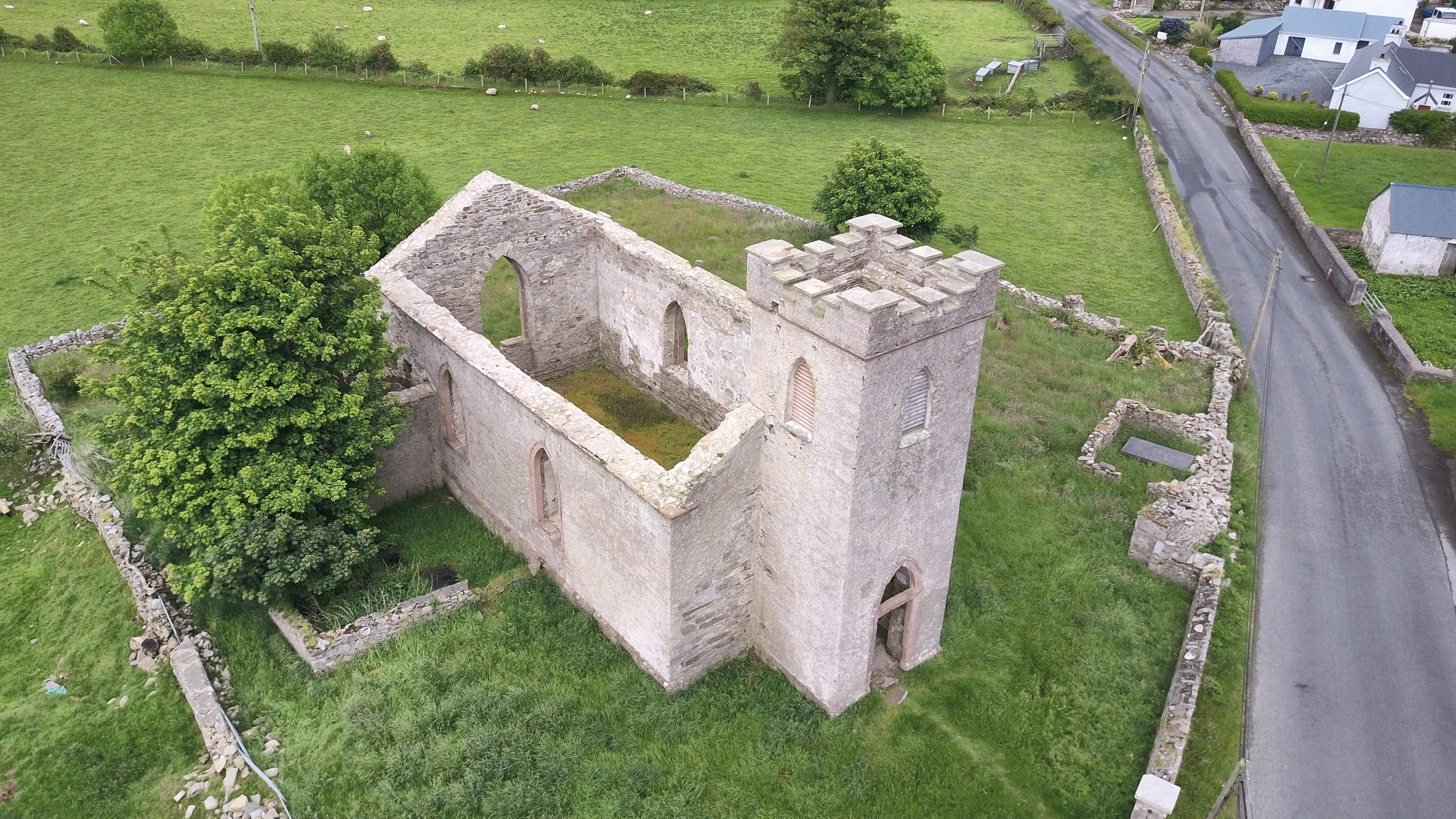
Straid Church

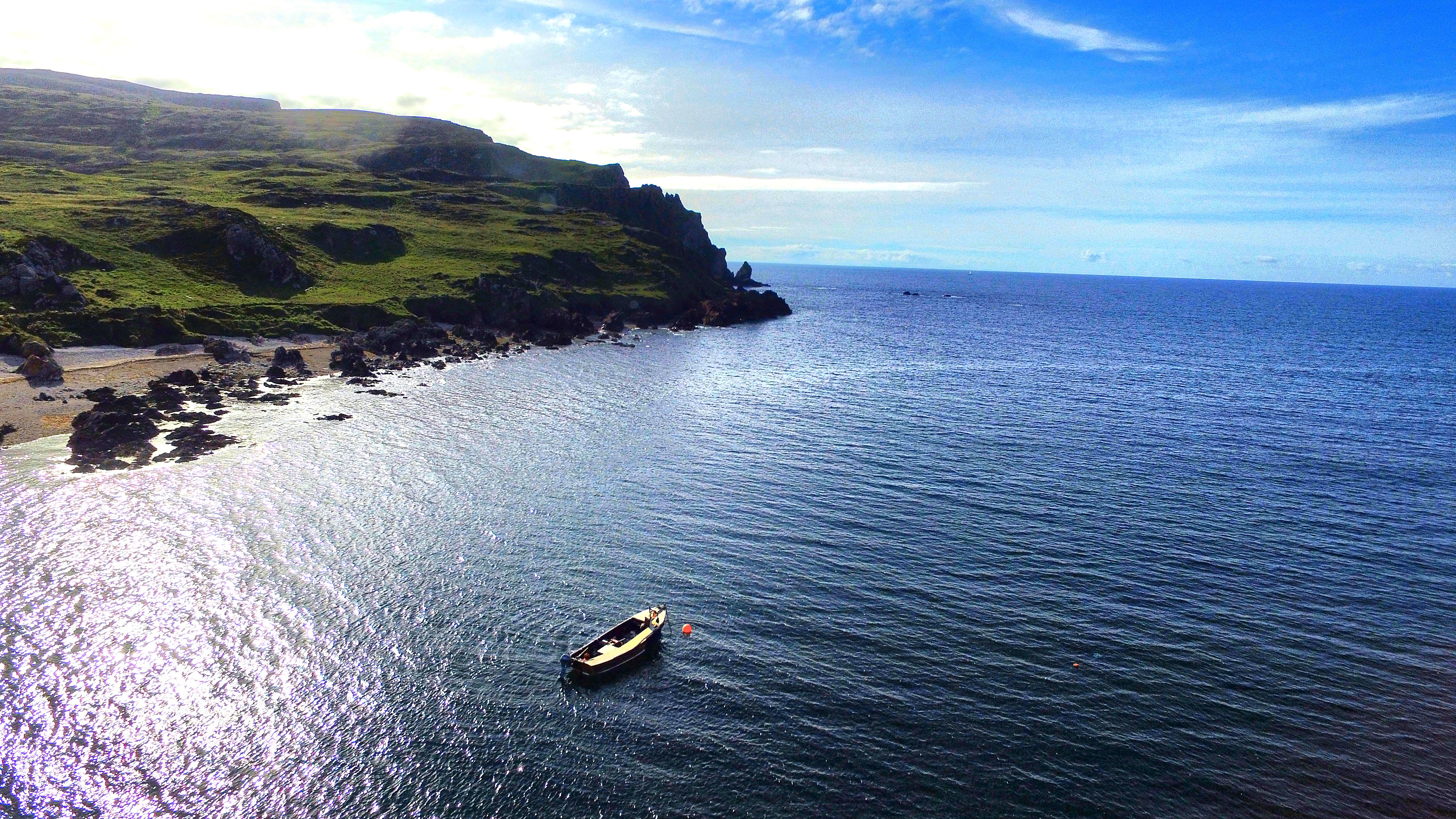
Roxtown Beach, west of Clonmany

== Name ==
The name of the village in Irish, Cluain Maine, has been translated as both "the meadow of (St) Maine" and "the meadow of the monk(s)". The former is the more widely recognised translation. The village is known locally as "The Cross", as the village was initially built around a crossroads.

== History ==
The parish was home to a monastery that was founded by St Columba. It was closely associated with the Morrison family, who provided the role of erenagh. The monastery possessed the Míosach, an 11th-century copper and silver shrine, now located in the National Museum of Ireland in Dublin.

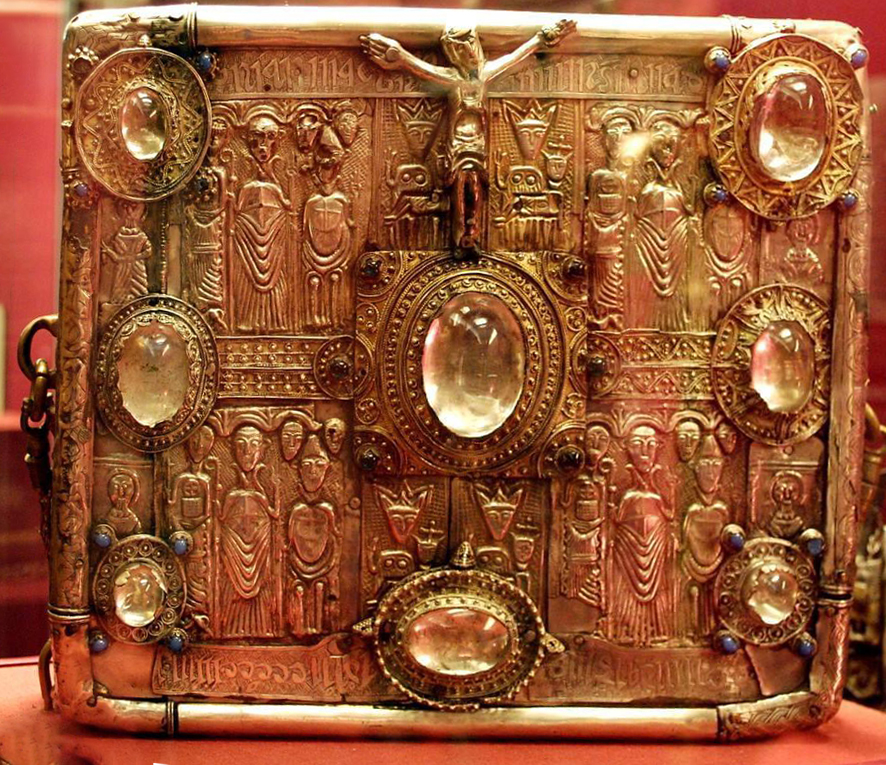
Clonmany Moisach

The village is sometimes claimed to be the youngest in Inishowen. The 18th-century travel writer, Richard Pococke, did not mention the village when he toured the area in 1752. The village is mentioned in Topographia Hibernica, published in 1795. It did not feature in the census of 1841 or 1851. In the 1861 census, 112 inhabitants are recorded as living in Clonmany in 21 houses. A further 3 houses are recorded as uninhabited.

=== Poitin Republic of Urris ===
In the early 19th century, Urris - a valley three miles west of Clonmany - became a centre of the illegal poitín distillation industry. The Urris Hills were an ideal place for poitín-making. The area was surrounded by mountains and only accessible through Mamore Gap and Crossconnell. Notwithstanding its remote location, Derry was about 16 miles away, providing a major market for the trade. To protect their lucrative business, the locals barricaded the road at Crossconnell to keep out revenue police, thus creating the "Poitin Republic of Urris". This period of relative independence lasted three years. But in 1815, the authorities re-established control of the Urris Hills and brought this short period of self-rule to an end.

=== 1840 earthquake ===
In 1840, the village experienced an earthquake, a comparatively rare event in Ireland. The shock was also felt in the nearby town of Carndonagh. The Belfast News Letter from Tuesday, 28 January 1840 reported that "In some places those who had retired to rest felt themselves shaken in their beds, and others were thrown from their chairs, and greatly alarmed."

=== The "Waterloo Priest" ===
Fr. William O'Donnell, also known as the "Waterloo Priest", was a prominent figure in the Parish of Clonmany from 1829 to 1853. Born in Cockhill, Buncrana in 1779, he initially declined the opportunity to become a priest after graduating from Maynooth College. Instead, he joined the army and fought in the Peninsular war, participating in the battles of Vitoria, Roncesvalles, Pyrenees, and ultimately at the Battle of Waterloo.

In 1819, Fr. O'Donnell was ordained and began serving as parish priest in Lower Fahan and Desertegney. He later moved to Clonmany in 1829, where he remained until his death in 1856. During his time in Clonmany, Fr. O'Donnell became deeply devoted to the people of the parish and worked tirelessly to improve their lives. He established five National schools in the Parish and was a strong advocate for the rights of local people.

In 1838, during the latter years of the tithe war, Fr. O'Donnell was jailed for non-payment of tithes to the Church of Ireland. He was imprisoned in Lifford Prison and became a national focal point in the campaign against the tithe system. Fr. O'Donnell continued his efforts to aid the people of Clonmany during the devastating Great Famine of 1845–1849. He set up a Relief Committee for Clonmany in 1846 to provide assistance to those suffering from starvation. Fr. O'Donnell died on 10 February 1856, in his residence in Clonmany at the age of 77.

=== Great Famine ===
Clonmany and its surrounding areas were severely impacted by the devastating potato blight, which led to the Irish Famine and caused significant loss of life among the rural population. As early as December 1845, signs of the impending disaster became apparent as the potato crop in Clonmany began to fail. The Church of Ireland Rector of Clonmany, Reverend George H. Young, reported to the Banner of Ulster newspaper that approximately half of the harvested potatoes were diseased, and an estimated three-fourths of the crop had already been lost. The situation was dire, and the availability of seed for the next season was uncertain.

In response to the crisis, local clergy members from both the Roman Catholic and Protestant communities made commendable efforts to raise funds and provide relief. By January 1847, a local relief committee was actively collecting funds to provide emergency food supplies. However, the scale of the crop failure and the outbreak of diseases like dysentery overwhelmed their endeavours.

The committee reached out to local landlords, appealing for financial assistance and forgiveness of rent arrears for struggling tenants. The response from landlords varied, with some demonstrating willingness to help, while others were not as supportive. Financial contributions came from Michael Loughrey, a local landlord associated with Binion Hall. Conversely, John Harvey and Mrs. Merrick expressed their refusal to support the relief efforts until outstanding rent arrears and other expenses were settled. The correspondence between the committee and the local landlords was subsequently published in the Derry Journal. During this period, the Derry Sentinel reported that Clonmany was witnessing a death rate of five to six individuals per day.

=== Trawbreaga Bay fishing disaster ===
On 23 April 1847, a fishing boat originating from the Isle of Doagh, located just outside Clonmany, embarked on a routine fishing trip with a crew of eight individuals. While navigating Trawbreaga Bay, the boat was unexpectedly overturned by a sudden swell, despite the seemingly calm weather conditions. Seven members of the crew perished as a result. The victims were identified as Donald Doherty, the boat's owner and a father of six; Patrick Doherty, who left behind a wife and three children; James MacLoughlin, survived by his wife and four children; Patrick (Roe) Doherty, a husband and father of one; William (Noher) Doherty, an unmarried young man; Hugh M'Cool, and John McLoughlin. William Doherty, the eighth person on board, managed to swim ashore and survive.

=== Land wars in the 19th century ===
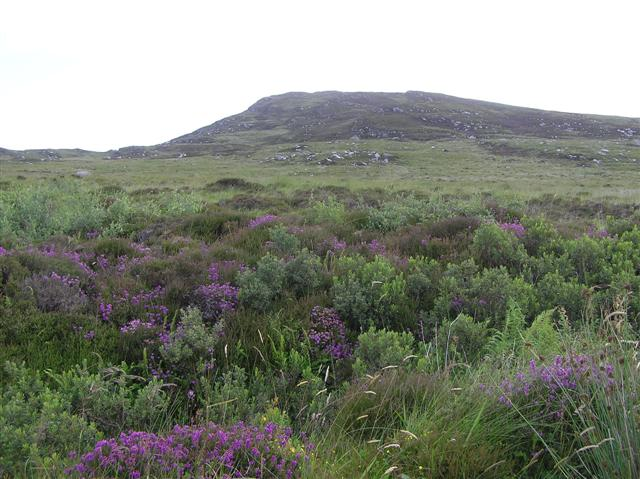
Rural Clonmany

In the 19th century, the rural areas around Clonmany saw conflicts about land ownership and tenant rights. A movement known as the Ribbon men gained popularity in the 1830s as they protested against landlords and their agents. In February 1832, a crowd of up to three thousand local tenants launched an attack on the properties of two prominent landlords, Michael Doherty of Glen House and Neal Loughrey of Binnion. The protesters demanded reduced rents and the elimination of tithe payments to the Church of Ireland. Unrest continued in mid-1833 when a local man named O'Donnell had his house destroyed by rioters due to his occupation of an evicted tenant's property. Additionally, rioters targeted the forge of the local blacksmith, a man called Conaghan, for providing services to the tithe agent. Properties belonging to individuals employed by landlords were also vandalized by the rioters.

In February 1834, a detachment of the 1st Royals Regiment from the Londonderry Garrison was stationed in the village to provide support to the civil authorities. However, further unrest erupted in April 1834, leading to property destruction by large rioting crowds.

Violence resurfaced in June 1838 when a group of local people attacked the residence of an absentee landlord, Mrs. Merrick, who was visiting the area to inspect her properties. In September 1838, the home of Mrs. Merrick's bailiff, Hugh Bradley, was assaulted. Bradley was severely beaten, and his house was ransacked by armed men. Mrs. Merrick later offered a reward of £100 for any information regarding the attacks on Bradley. The Times of London described the situation as “..security there is none for either life or property in the unhappy district of Clonmany”.

On the evening of 3 November 1841, the Binion estate belonging to Michael Loughrey suffered an attack. Eight stores of oats and several haystacks were simultaneously set on fire.

In 1852, local tenants targeted Charles McClintock, a civil engineer surveying local properties on behalf of Michael Doherty, one of the main landlords in the area. The attackers fired shots into McClintock's bedroom and pelted his house with rocks.

At times, the violence assumed a sectarian character. In January 1861, the Protestant chapel in Clonmany was attacked, with smashed windows and a destroyed door.

During the 1880s, evictions and protests against landlordism became relatively common occurrences. In January 1881, four local men were arrested for unlawful assembly and riotous behaviour after assaulting a bailiff employed by landlord Harvey. A Clonmany branch of the Land League was established, named after the organization's founder, Michael Davitt. The activities of the Land League in the area were frequently reported by the Derry Journal, which documented a steady stream of protests and evictions throughout the 1880s.

The local Catholic clergy actively defended tenant rights and, in collaboration with the Land League, advocated on behalf of individual tenants to local landlords. In December 1885, the clergy and Land League representatives met with Mr. Loughrey, a landlord known for his strained relationship with tenants. When the Land League representatives commented on the low value of land, Mr. Loughrey retorted, "the tenants were too cheaply rented, that they wanted to drive me and my family to the workhouse, but I will take steps to draw a good many there along with me." The Loughrey estate was one of the largest in the area.

Evictions often led to protests. To stop these protests, landlords would often bring in police and soldiers. Sometimes, tenants would owe years of rent before they were evicted. For example, on 1 June 1881, 80 armed police entered Clonmany to oversee a series of evictions organised jointly by four local landlords. The Land League and the local parish priest, Father Maguire, organised a protest march against the evictions. The evictions were a difficult process. Bailiffs were often not sure where properties were located, and they sometimes evicted the wrong people. There were also disputes about whether the rents had been paid. In March 1882, the Derry Journal reported that a further 18 evictions had taken place on the Loughrey estate which made over 100 individuals homeless.

The eviction of Catherine Doherty in August 1882 was typical. She was a widow who lived in Cleagh, a townland just outside Clonmany. She had accumulated significant arrears before her landlord took proceedings against her. The Derry Journal recorded the event.

"The first house visited was that of widow Catherine Doherty. She owed two years' rent. A writ was served on her in May 1881, Just two days after the rent became due. She tried to have a settlement effected but all in vain. She offered two years' rent (£8 11s) with half the costs, but that offer was flatly refused by the agent, who would accept nothing less than the entire amount of rent and costs, to be paid before he would leave the house. The Rev. Father O'Doherty, P.P., Father Maguire, and Father McCullagh were in attendance during the first eviction and reasoned with Mr. Harvey for a long time. Men were ordered to clear out the furniture. This occupied a considerable time. The usual formalities being gone through of binding up the doors, and giving possession to the agent. The ranks of the soldiers and police were ordered (to) march to Rooskey, where the next eviction was (to) come off. Denis O'Donnell, three in the family, was the tenant. His time of redemption having expired"

Concerns about the extent of evictions around Clonmany were raised in parliament by the Irish Nationalist MP O'Donnell. In March 1882, he asked the Chief Secretary to the Lord Lieutenant of Ireland if he knew about:

"the extensive evictions of tenants, for arrears of rent, are taking place, or are about to take place, in the districts of Clonmany, Binnion, Garryduff, Adderville, and Cardonagh, in the county of Donegal; whether it is true that meetings of the inhabitants to protest against these evictions, and to invite public sympathy with poor tenants, on the ground of their incapability to pay the unreduced rents accumulating since the years of distress, have been prohibited by the Government".

In May 1883, Thomas Sexton (the Irish Nationalist MP for Sligo) questioned the conduct of the Royal Irish Constabulary towards evicted tenants in Clonmany in parliament. Mr. Sexton reported that a tenant farmer named Doherty was prevented by the police from erecting huts for evicted families. He stated that 23 families, comprising 108 people, sought refuge in Clonmany, with up to four families sleeping in one small house. Sir George Trevelyan, the Chief Secretary for Ireland, disputed this account, arguing that Doherty wished to build his hut near evicted farms, requiring the police to establish an outpost for property protection, which would incur local costs.

In September 1885, landlords sent "Emergency Men" to claim farms from evicted tenants. After the tenants were removed from their homes, they continued to use the land to grow crops. The "Emergency men" arrived to take possession of these crops. In order to protect these new arrivals, the police were required to station half a dozen men in the district.

Protests often targeted individuals who had assisted in evictions. In July 1888, seven men were charged with disrupting the burial of Patrick Cavanagh, a Crimean War veteran and caretaker of evicted tenants’ properties on the Loughery estate. His role made him deeply unpopular. The accused—John O’Donnell, William Harkin, William and Patrick Gubbin, Owen Doherty (all from Clonmany), Constantine Doherty (Cleagh), and Michael Doherty (Cloontagh)—filled his grave with stones and blocked the burial. No one in the village would provide a coffin, and despite pleas from local Catholic clergy, the protesters threatened to exhume the body if it were buried. Eventually, the Local Government Board issued an administrative order to remove the body for interment in the Carndonagh Workhouse cemetery. The case aroused much interest and was reported widely across the United Kingdom. Two of the accused - Owen Doherty and Constantine Doherty - were found guilty of unlawful assembly and sentenced to six months imprisonment. The remaining men were discharged.

=== First World War ===
The area around Clonmany has a number of military associations. In 1914, the British Army opened a training camp named Glenfield Camp, which was located near Glen House, Straid. During World War I, up to 5,000 soldiers were garrisoned at Glenfield, including battalions from the Royal Inniskilling Fusiliers, the Devonshire Regiment and the Royal Irish Fusiliers.

While stationed at Clonmany, Thomas Rowlands of the 4th Reserve Battalion, The Duke of Cornwall's Light Infantry was awarded the Albert Medal for bravery. On 21 October 1918, a grenade with an ignited fuse accidentally fell into the firing bay. Rowlands shouted for the party to take cover and exit the trench. However, one soldier failed to move. Rowlands, displaying great courage, returned to the trench, retrieved the grenade, and threw it over the parapet, where it exploded.

There were also military establishments in Leenan and Dunree. The latter fort was first established during the Napoleonic wars. Both Leenan and Dunree were used to guard the entrance of Loch Swilley, which was used to station part of the Royal Navy's Atlantic Fleet. These latter two camps formed part of the Treaty Ports, which the UK Armed Forces continued to use after the Irish Free State was established. These camps were transferred to the Irish Armed Forces in October 1938.

=== Irish War of Independence ===
The Irish War of Independence (1919-1921) resulted from the Irish people's desire for home rule and autonomy. The conflict involved the Irish Republican Army (IRA) using guerrilla warfare against British forces, leading to violence and reprisals. The war ended with the signing of the Anglo-Irish Treaty (1921) establishing the Irish Free State.

In early 1920, an IRA company was formed in Clonmany. It was part of the 2nd Battalion of the Donegal IRA based in Carndonagh, which included companies from Clonmany, Culdaff, Malin, Malin Head, and Carndonagh.

In August 1920, the IRA conducted raids to seize firearms from local residents, prompting British forces to raid Clonmany in November 1920. These searches resulted in damage to properties and the discovery of significant amounts of ammunition.

In April 1921, farmer Joseph Doherty of Lenan was found guilty of possessing firearms not under military control. A shotgun was found in his mother's home, but Doherty claimed ignorance and suggested it was planted. He refused to acknowledge the court's authority, seen as evidence of his affiliation with an illegal society.

One of the most notorious incidents to occur in Clonmany during the conflict took place on 10 May 1921, when two Royal Irish Constabulary (RIC) constables, Alexander Clarke and Charles Murdock, were abducted and subsequently murdered by the IRA. Clarke and Murdock, both stationed at the RIC Barracks in Clonmany, were kidnapped while taking an evening walk near Straid. Clarke was shot and thrown into the sea, with his body washing up on the seashore near Binion the following day. Constable Murdock, originally from Dublin, reportedly survived the initial attack, managed to escape, and sought refuge among residents of Binion. However, he was betrayed to the IRA, resulting in his murder. To this day, Murdock's body remains undiscovered, although local tradition suggests that he may have been buried in a bog near Binion Hill. In June 1921, a military court convened in Clonmany to conduct a postmortem examination on Constable Clarke. The court concluded that Clarke died from gunshot wounds to the heart, jaw, and neck, and noted the absence of his firearm and ammunition. Clarke was 23 years old and unmarried at the time of his death.

A few days after the murders of Constables Murdock and Clarke, six bridges along the road between Buncrana and Clonmany were destroyed by explosives. This effectively cut off a large part of North Inishowen and delayed the return of Constable Clarke's body to England. The authorities had to ask local people to help repair the bridges so that the body could be transported.

Several weeks later, on 10 July 1921, Crown Forces conducted raids on a number of houses in Clonmany in search of Sinn Féin activists. While three young men from the village were initially arrested, they were subsequently released shortly afterwards and allowed to return home.

In July 1921, railway workers stationed at Clonmany railway station refused to transport British soldiers. As a result, the soldiers were removed from the train and sent back to Leenan Fort.

=== Civil War ===
The Irish Civil War, which took place from 1922 to 1923, was a deeply divisive conflict that broke out a few months after the signing of the Anglo-Irish Treaty. The treaty had established the Irish Free State but left contentious issues unresolved, particularly the question of whether to accept limited independence or push for a complete break from British rule and establish a republic. The conflict pitted anti-treaty irregular forces against the National Army. Ultimately, the National Army emerged victorious, resulting in the establishment of the Irish Free State as a self-governing dominion within the British Commonwealth.

During the early stages of Irish Civil War, Clonmany was captured by the Free State's National Army. A train was commandeered from Buncrana. On 1 July 1922, it moved troops to Clonmany and later to Carndonagh. The capture of Clonmany was peaceful. When the troops arrived in Carndonagh, a gun battle broke out with Anti-Treaty Irregulars, who had taken up positions in the workhouse. The Irregulars agreed to surrender after the Free State Army had opened fire with a machine gun.

=== Second World War ===
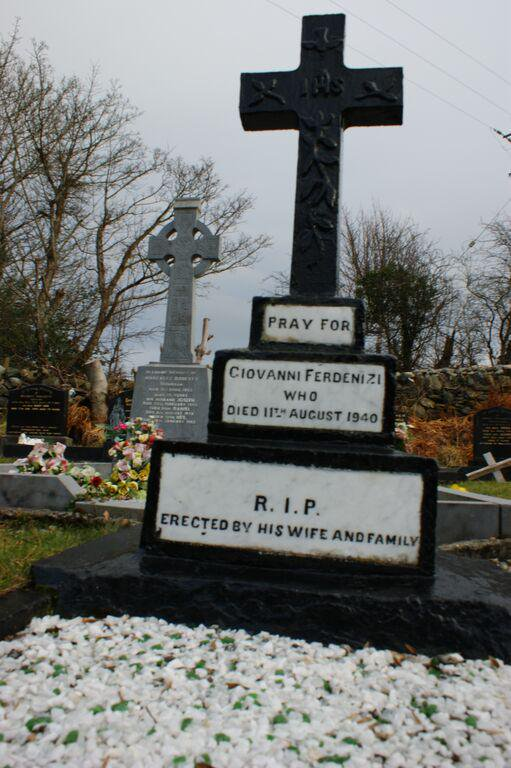
Giovanni Ferdenizi, a victim of the sinking of the SS Arandora Star in 1940, was buried in Clonmany

During the mid-20th century, a cottage-based textiles industry had developed around Clonmany. During the war, many local women were contracted to make shirts for the British Army. These contracts were allocated to cottage producers by firms in Buncrana and Derry that were unable to manage the large orders from the British War Office.

In August 1940, a body washed up on the shore at Gaddyduff, Clonmany. The body was recovered by Denis Kealey, a farmer's son, of Leenan. A postcard was found on the body indicating that the victim was Giovanni Ferdenzi; an Italian migrant to the UK, who lived in Kings Cross. He was previously held at Worth-Mills Internment Camp. The cause of death was heart failure due to exposure. The body was given a Catholic burial at Clonmany. Giovanni was being transported to Canada on SS Arandora Star, which was sunk by a U-boat on 2 July 1940. A second unidentifiable body was washed ashore on Ballyliffin strand.

During the war, mines regularly washed up around the Clonmany shoreline. In June 1942, a mine exploded at Urris. The Irish military also rendered another mine harmless after it washed ashore at Ballyliffin. In March 1946, eight mines were destroyed by the Irish Army after they had floated close to the shoreline between Ballyliffin and Clonmany. The mines appeared after a heavy storm.

=== Post-War period ===
At 2 am on 21 November 1994, the village experienced a minor earthquake. The seismic event measured 2.1 on the Richter Scale.

=== Twenty-first century ===
Clonmany was connected to internet broadband in April 2005.

Seven young local men and a pensioner died in a road accident just outside the village on the evening of 11 July 2010. The event received national media coverage.

== Floods, storms, beaches and dangerous sea currents ==
The village periodically suffers from Atlantic storms causing flooding, particularly after heavy summer rainfall. On 28 May 1892, three hours of torrential rain led to the breaking of Clonmany river banks, flooding hundreds of acres and causing crop and livestock losses. In December 1894, another storm damaged church roofs and blew away thatched cottage roofs, destroying agricultural production.

Significant flooding occurred in 1924. In October 1945, four bridges over the Clonmany river were swept away, dislocating traffic between Clonmany and Buncrana. In September 1952, heavy rain caused the Clonmany riverbanks to break, flooding corn fields, especially around Crossconnell. In August 1952, heavy rain and high tide flooded the village itself. In late August 2017, heavy rains caused severe flooding, with residents being rescued and the R238 road closed. The R238 road, which links the village with Dumfree, was closed after a bridge collapsed. The Irish defense forces were deployed to help with rescue and cleanup efforts. The area was highlighted in the 2014 Flood Risk Assessment Report for potential flood protection due to rising sea levels.

There are several beaches around Clonmany that attract tourists. However, these beaches have dangerous sea currents, posing a risk to swimmers. In August 1945, a 15-year-old boy drowned while bathing at Clonmany Strand. In September 1959, two young men, aged 26 and 15, drowned at Tullagh Beach after encountering difficulties while swimming.

== Places of interest ==
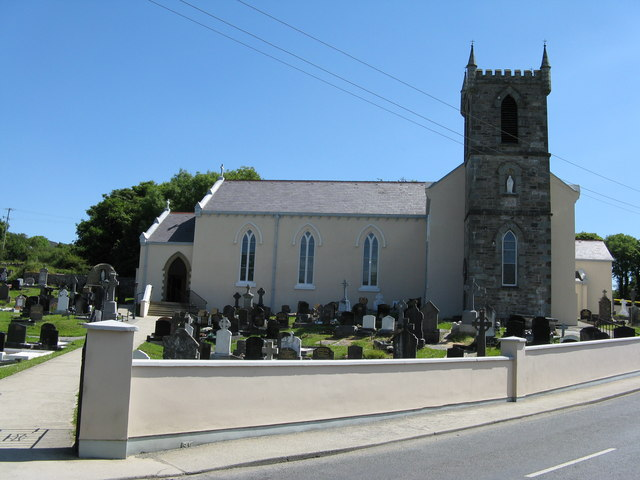
Clonmany's Catholic church

St. Mary's Roman Catholic Church - An example of a pre-emancipation Catholic church, construction on this building started around 1814, with an extension to north to form T- plan built in 1833. A three-stage tower on square-plan was built in 1843.

Clonmany Church of Ireland Parish Church - Located in Straid, just outside the village, this church was built in 1772 and altered in 1830. The building is now a ruin but is accessible to visitors. The graveyard also contains a number of early 18-century graves that predate the present edifice and may be associated with an earlier church on the site.

Clonmany Bridge - Clonmany Bridge, built around 1800, is a triple-arch structure with humpbacked design over the Clonmany River. Constructed using local rubble stone, it features round-headed arches with stone voussoirs, cutwaters, and a crenellated parapet. Predating the establishment of Clonmany village, it was in existence in 1814, when it is outlined in Revd. Molloy's Statistical Account of the Parish of Clonmany.

Clehagh Thatched Cottage - Located behind the church, this detached single-storey house, built c. 1820, incorporates elements of traditional architecture. It features a thatched roof with latticed restraining ropes and cast-iron stays. The walls are made of limewashed render on random rubble stone. Historical records from around 1837 show a house on this site.

== Climate ==
Clonmany, situated on the Inishowen peninsula and nestled alongside Lough Swilly, benefits from its location with a pleasant and moderate climate. The area experiences temperate, mild summers and winters that rarely dip below freezing temperatures. In terms of average temperatures, this region tends to be warmer than the national average during winter and cooler than the national average during summer.

== Education ==
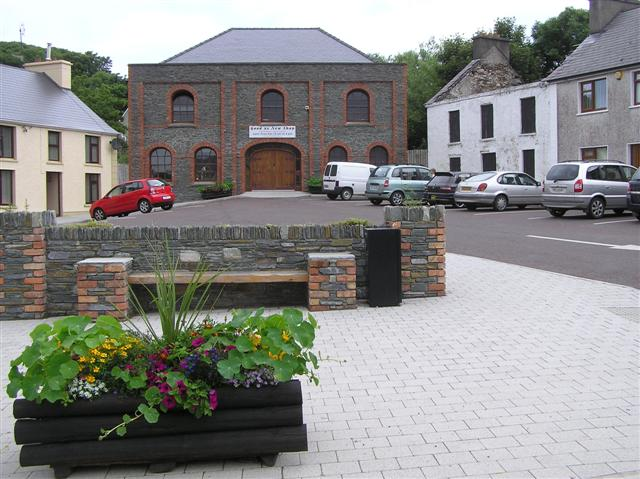
The Square, Clonmany

Clonmany and the surrounding area is home to four primary schools. The first one is Clonmany N.S. Another local option is Scoil Naomh Treasa, also known as Tiernasligo N.S. Additionally, there's Scoil Phádraig located at Rashenny and Scoil na gCluainte, also referred to as Cloontagh National School. The majority of students from these schools move on to Carndonagh Community School in Carndonagh for their secondary education. Some others opt for Scoil Mhuire or Crana College in Buncrana. There used to be a national school in Crossconnell, which was established in the 19th century. However, it was shut down in the late 1960s.

== Transport ==
Clonmany railway station opened on 1 July 1901, but finally closed on 2 December 1935. The station was a stop on the Londonderry and Lough Swilly Railway Company (The L&LSR, the Swilly) that operated in parts of County Londonderry and County Donegal.

== Culture and tourism ==
During the week of the Irish August public holiday, Clonmany hosts an annual event known as the Clonmany Festival. One of the highlights of this festival is the Clonmany Agricultural Show and Sheepdog Trials, which specifically takes place on the Tuesday of the festival week.

Details of local culture, history and traditions were recorded in "The Last of the Name". A local schoolteacher Patrick Kavanagh (not the poet) wrote down numerous stories remembered by a Clonmany local, Charles McGlinchey.

== Sports ==
The Clonmany Tug of War team, formed in 1946, has achieved six world gold medals and twenty All-Ireland titles.

The village's soccer team, Clonmany Shamrocks, plays at Shamrocks Park, Gort, Clonmany. During the 2008/2009 season, the club won the Knockalla Caravans Ulster Senior Cup, a competition organized by the Ulster Football Association.

Urris is the local GAA team and the home ground is situated in Straid, Clonmany. The team colors are red and black.

== Folklore ==
Clonmany is associated with a folktale concerning a priest and his encounter with fairies. According to the story, the fairies or the little people are fallen Angels who cannot obtain Christian salvation. A priest is walking on the road from Clonmany to Ballyliffen. He meets a group of fairies who ask him if they can be saved. He throws his prayer book at the fairies who instantly run away. Afterwards, the priest continues on his journey.

== See also ==
- List of populated places in Ireland
- Market Houses in Ireland
