= Roncesvalles (disambiguation) =

Roncesvalles is a small village in Navarre, northern Spain.

Roncesvalles may also refer to:

- Roncevaux Pass, a mountain pass near this village, called Roncesvalles in Spanish
  - Battle of Roncevaux Pass, fought in 778
  - Battle of Roncevaux Pass (824)
  - Battle of Roncesvalles (1813)
- Roncesvalles, Toronto, an urban neighbourhood in Toronto, Canada
  - Roncesvalles Avenue
- Roncesvalles, Colombia, a municipality in the Tolima department
