= Inishowen East =

Barony in County Donegal, Ireland

Inishowen East Inis Eoghain Thoir (Irish)
- Barony
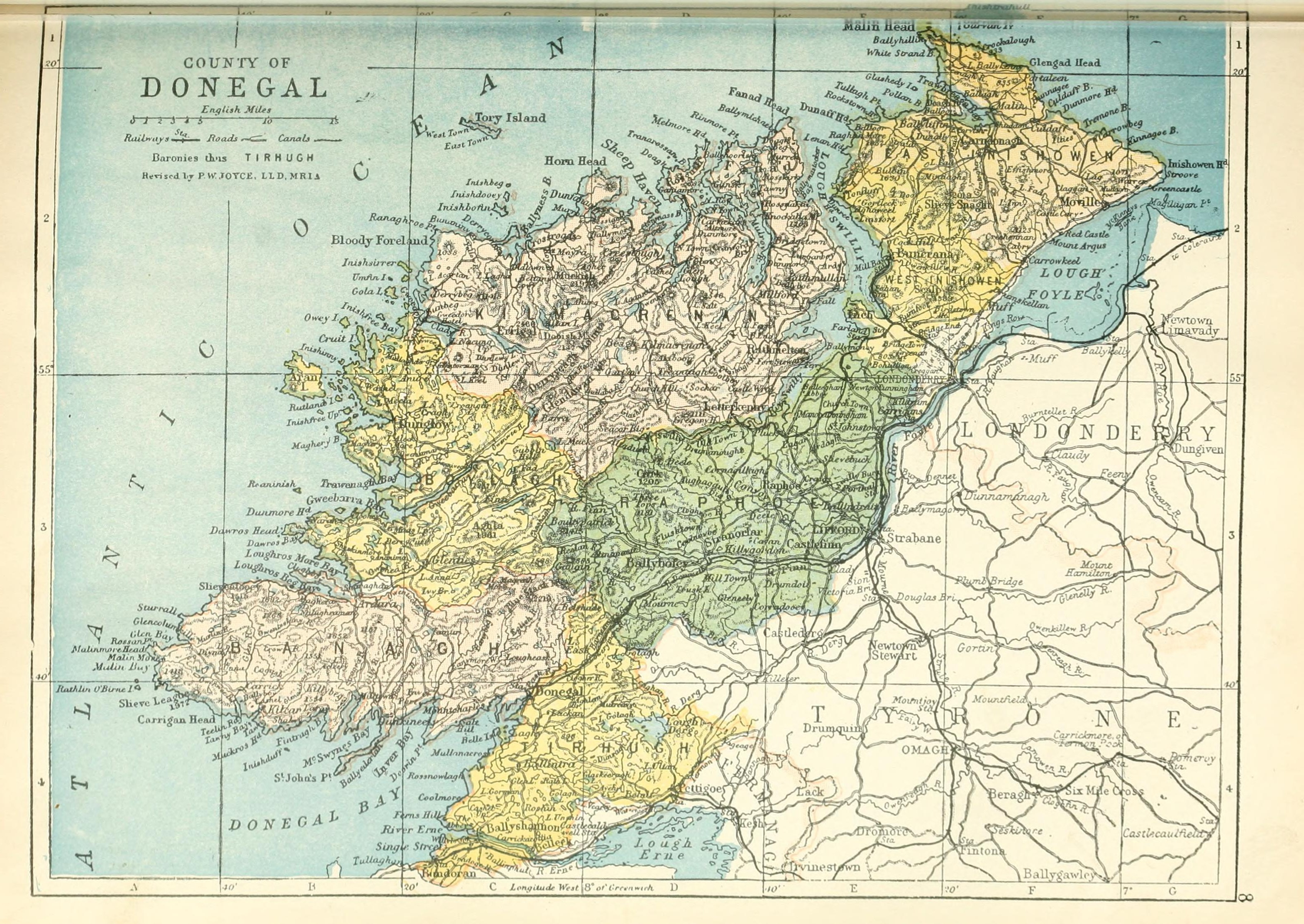
- Barony map of County Donegal, 1900; Inishowen East is in the northeast, coloured pale yellow.

- Location within Ireland
- Coordinates: 55°14′N 7°8′W
- Sovereign state: Ireland
- Province: Ulster
- County: Donegal

Area
  - Total: 499.20 km^{2} (192.74 sq mi)

Inishowen East (Irish: Inis Eoghain Thoir), also called East Inishowen or Innishowen East, is a barony in County Donegal, Ireland. Baronies were mainly cadastral rather than administrative units. They acquired modest local taxation and spending functions in the 19th century before being superseded by the Local Government (Ireland) Act 1898.

== Etymology ==
Inishowen East takes its name from Inishowen, in Irish Inis Eoghain, "Eoghan's island [peninsula]", referring to Eógan mac Néill, a semi-legendary king of the 5th century AD and ancestor of the Cenél nEógain dynasty.

== Geography ==
Inishowen East is located in the northeast of the Inishowen Peninsula.

== History ==
Inishowen East was once part of the ancient kingdom of Moy Ith. Inishowen was originally a single barony but was divided in the 1830s into West and East.

== List of settlements ==
Below is a list of settlements in Inishowen East:

- Ballyliffin
- Carndonagh
- Clonmany
- Culdaff
- Greencastle
- Malin
- Moville
- Shrove
