= Carndonagh railway station =

Railway station in County Donegal, Ireland

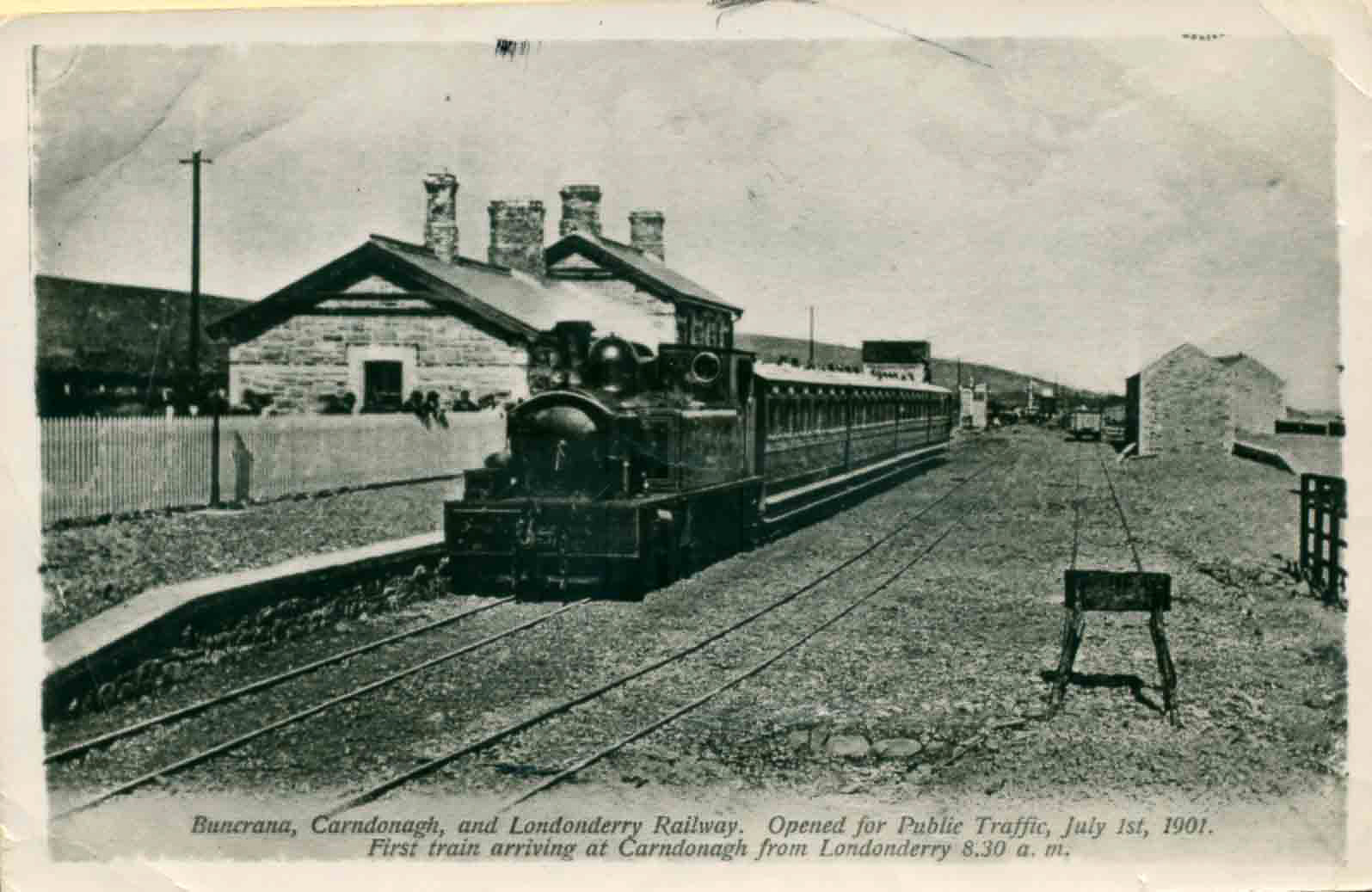
- The first train arriving at Carndonagh from Derry on 1 July 1901

General information
- Location: Carndonagh, County Donegal; Ireland
- Coordinates: 55.25335°N 7.2616°W
- Elevation: 95 ft (29 m)

History
- Original company: Londonderry and Lough Swilly Railway
- Post-grouping: Londonderry and Lough Swilly Railway

Key dates
- 1 July 1901: Station opens
- 2 December 1935: Station closes
Location

Carndonagh railway station is a disused station that served the town of Carndonagh and surrounding area in County Donegal, Ireland. It was the terminal station on the branch line of the Londonderry and Lough Swilly Railway Line that served the northern part of the Inishowen peninsula. This extension was known as the Buncrana to Carndonagh branch line, and measured 18.5 miles. The line was sometimes also known as the Carndonagh extension.

== History ==
Construction of the extension line from Buncrana to Carndonagh started in May 1899. A ceremony marking the beginning of work was held in the Carndonagh on May 23, 1899. Lady Balfour, wife of the chief secretary of Ireland, "cut the first sod". Lord Balfour also attended the event, along with Mr Thomas Robertson, chairman of the Irish Board of Works. The previous night there was a torch light procession and bonfire celebration in the town. During the festivities, a tar barrel fell on two children, killing one and severely burning the other. In his opening remarks, Lord Balfour expressed his regret for the accident.

The station opened on 1 July 1901. The Londonderry and Lough Swilly Railway provided passenger services and goods transportation from their Londonderry Graving Dock station to Buncrana and northwards to Clonmany, Ballyliffin and Carndonagh. When the Carndonagh Extension was opened, there were seven weekday trains to Buncrana, of which the 6.30 and 11.50 a.m. and 4.30 p.m. were extended to the Carndonagh. Two all-station trains ran to Carndonagh and back on Sundays. In 1901, the published timetable anticipated that the journey from Londonderry to Carndonagh would take two hours and ten minutes.

During the Irish Civil War, the Free State Army used the Buncrana to Carndonagh extension to transport troops and gain control of the North Inishowen. Services to the station were temporarily suspended in early July 1922, but were eventually restored after Free State Forces gained control of Carndonagh.

The Clonmany local councillor - John McCarron - was assaulted at the station. He was returning home from a District Board meeting held in Carndonagh on February 1, 1909. As he tried to enter a train carriage, McCarron was confronted by John Doherty (Roe) of Buncrana. Doherty wanted to prevent access to the carriage in order to play a card game with colleagues. Doherty hit McCarron in the face, causing McCarron's mouth to bleed and loosen a tooth. Doherty had previous convictions for drunkenness, using obscene language and obstruction. The local magistrate bound over Doherty to keep the peace.

in 1917, Eamonn De Valera passed through the station, travelling to a political meeting in the town.

In April 1928, the midday Londonderry train collided with a horse and cart as it was traversing a level crossing about a mile from the railway station. The train destroyed the cart and severely mutilated the horse, which was subsequently put down. The rider, a boy called Neal Doherty, received minor injuries.

In February 1933, a large barrel, containing 160 lbs of yeast was seized by the authorities at the station. The barrel was described in the manifest as "apples" while the delivery address was fictitious. The consignment was almost certainly destined to be used for the illicit production of Poitín. At the time, ownership and use of yeast was highly regulated as part of the effort to clamp down on the illegal production of alcohol. The press described the seizure as the largest ever recorded in Inishowen.

Throughout the 1930s, the station was used as a seed distribution point to local farmers by the Irish Free State Department of Agriculture.

The station had a corn store to provide warehousing facilities for agricultural products. The building was demolished in 1935 to make way for an alcohol factory.

As local road transportation improved, passengers and goods moved away from the railways and the line faced mounting financial pressures. The station was closed on 2 December 1935, along with all the other stations north of Buncrana. The rail tracks were torn up in February 1939.

== Travel times and fares ==
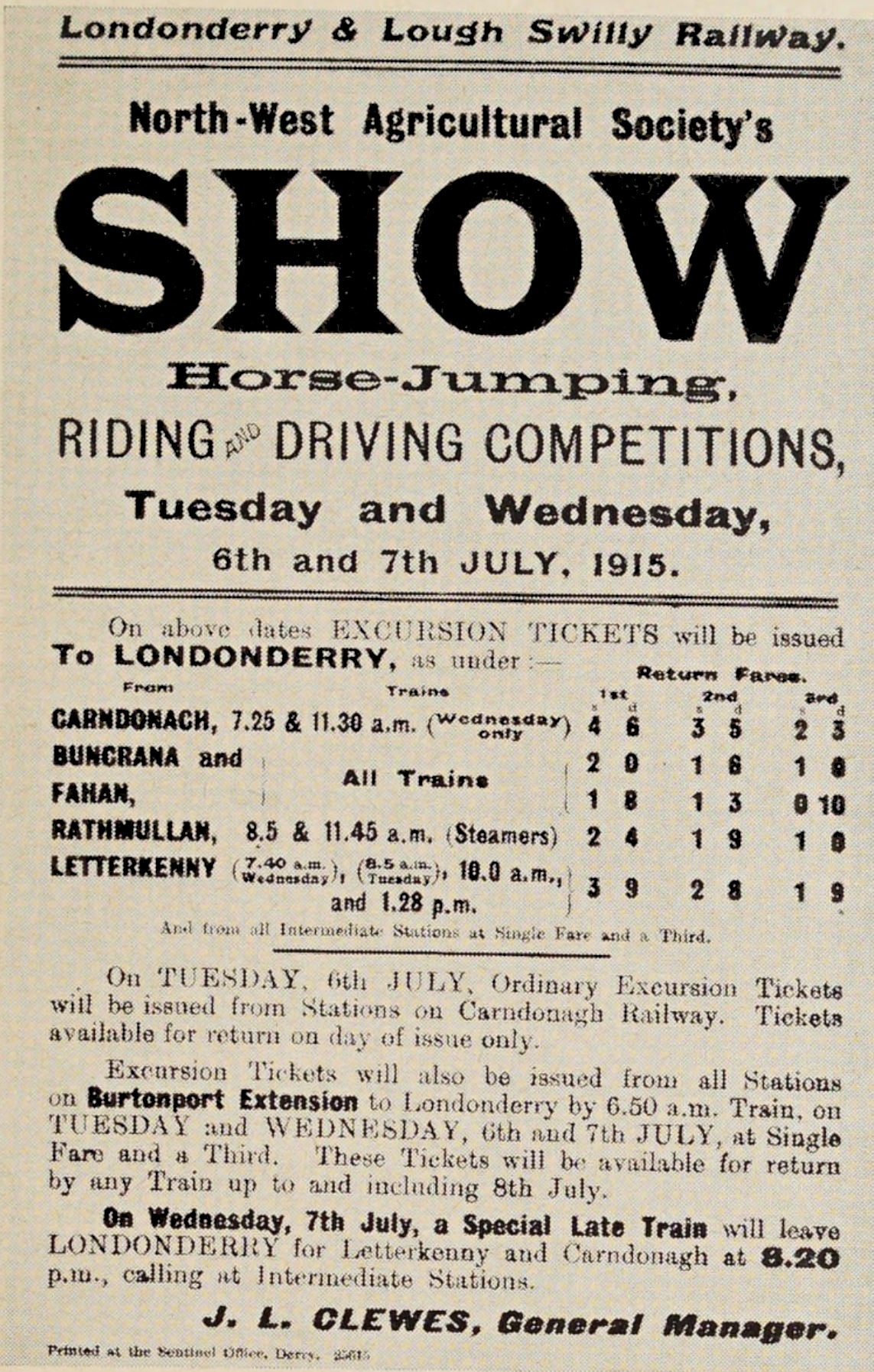
A handbill advertising an excursion on the Carndonagh extension of the railway, 1915.

When the line opened in 1901, the advertised fare from Londonderry to Carndonagh was four shillings, three shillings, and two shillings for first, second and third class respectively. The return fares from Buncrana to Carndonagh were three shillings, two shillings and three pence, and one shilling and sixpence for each of the three classes of travel.

In 1930, the rail timetable indicated a travel time from Carndonagh to Buncrana of one hour and fifteen minutes. The journey from Carndonagh to Clonmany was scheduled to take 30 minutes. At that time, the day return 3rd class fare for that journey was advertised to be 2 shillings and sixpence.

== Station buildings today ==
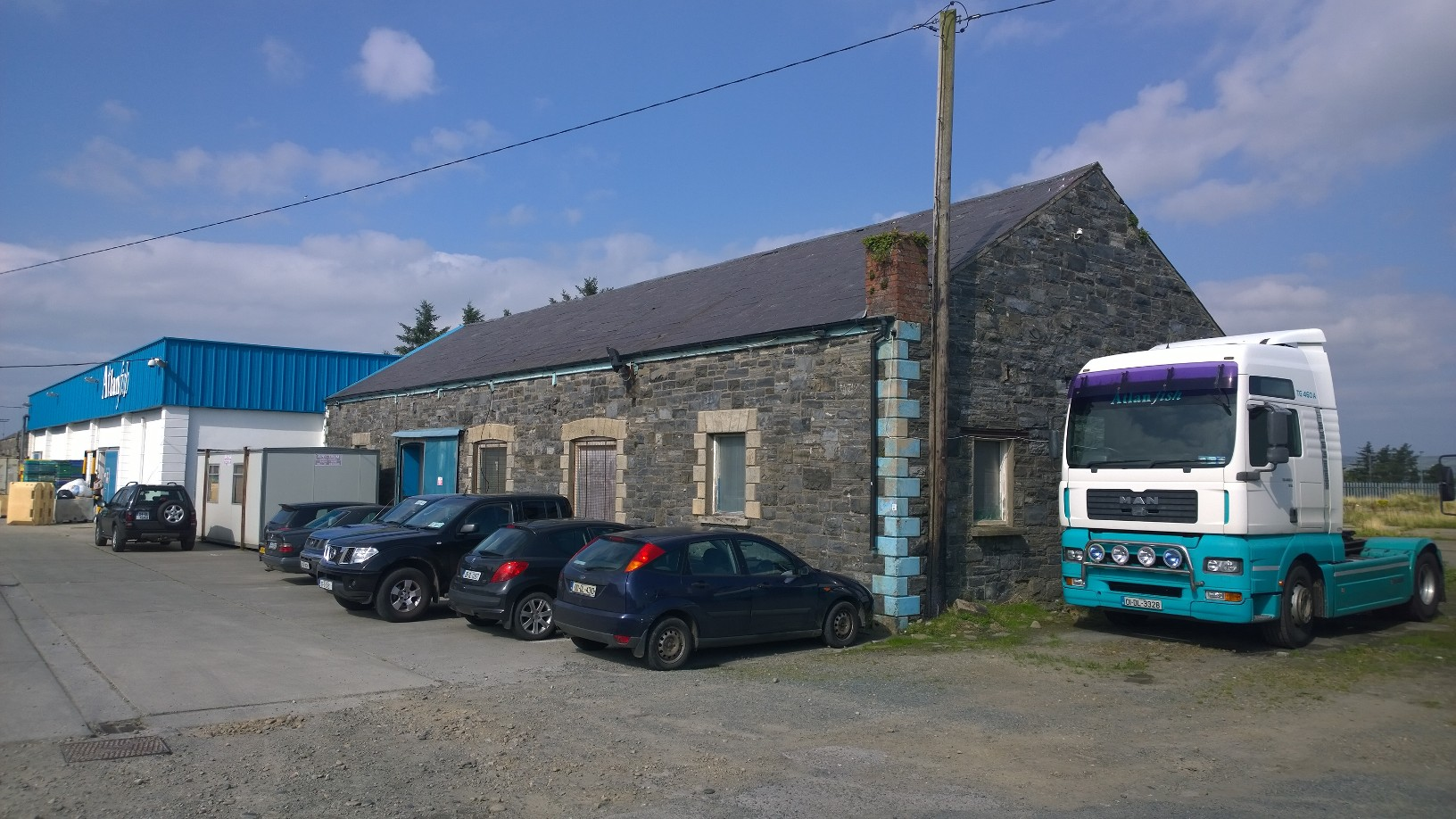
Former goods warehouse at Carndonagh station

The railway station and station master's house are still largely intact and can be found in the Churchland Quarters district of the town. The station buildings were constructed in 1900–1. The main building comprises a central three-bay two-storey block with attached four-bay single-storey block to east and single-bay single-storey block to west.

When the line closed in 1935, the station master's house was converted into a residence. More recently, the main station building is used as commercial offices. The former railway goods sheds and former engine house to the north of site survive in relatively good condition, despite some alterations and modern additions. The buildings are listed in Ireland's National Inventory of Architectural Heritage on account of their social and historical importance.

== Gallery ==
Former station and stationmasters house.

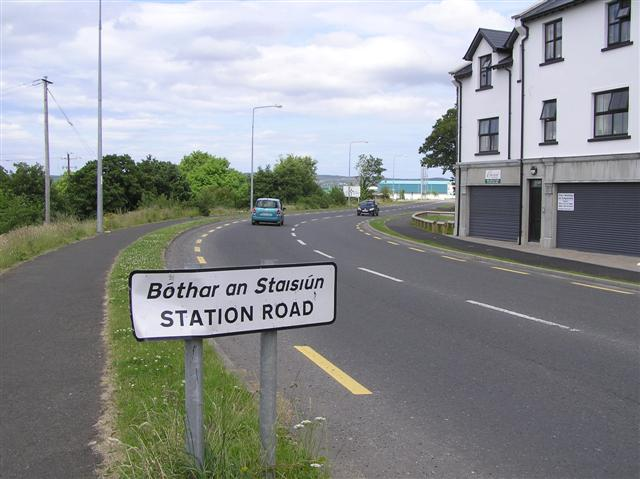
Station Road, Carndonagh

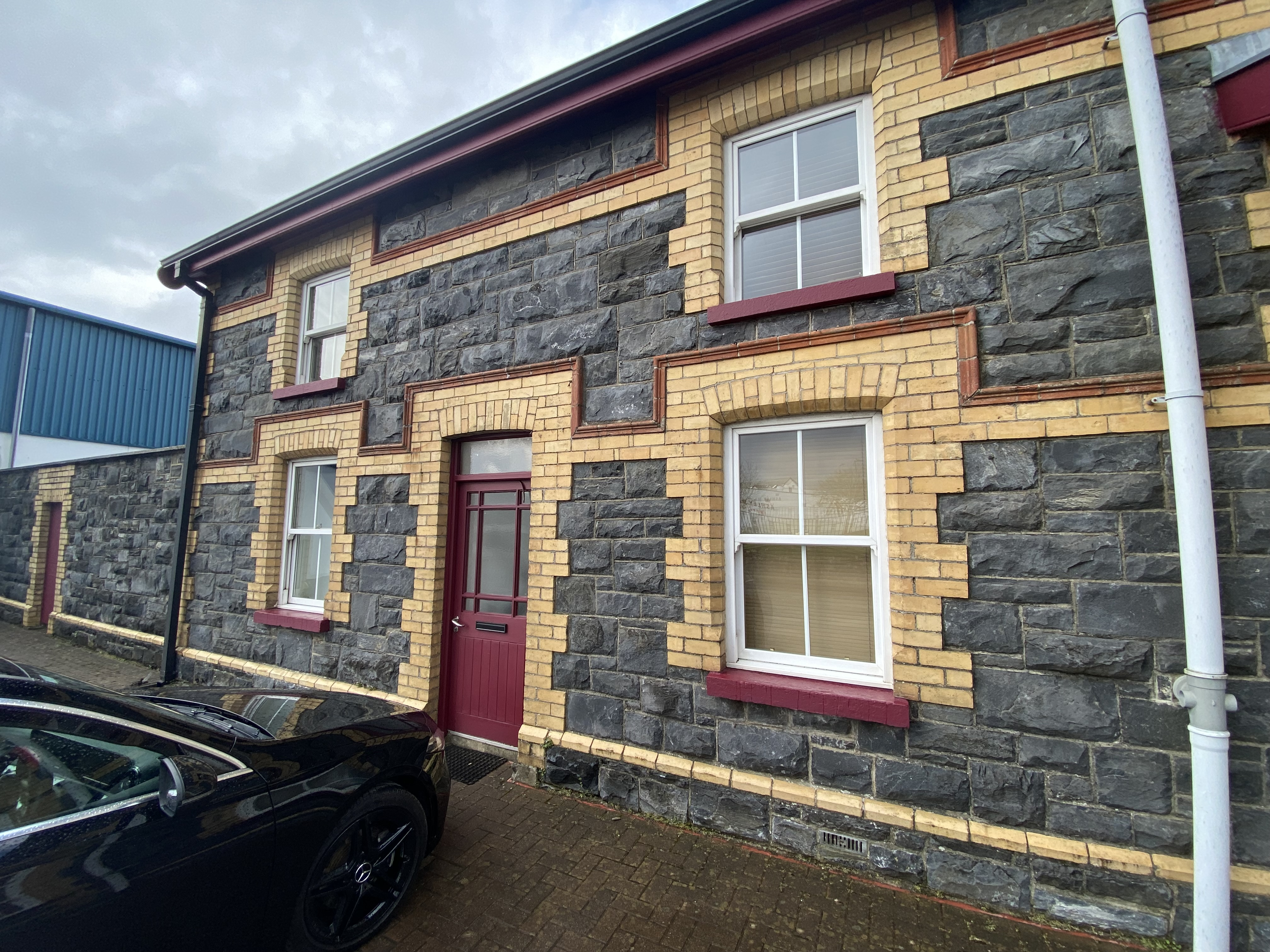
The road side of the stationmaster's house, showing the door to the building.

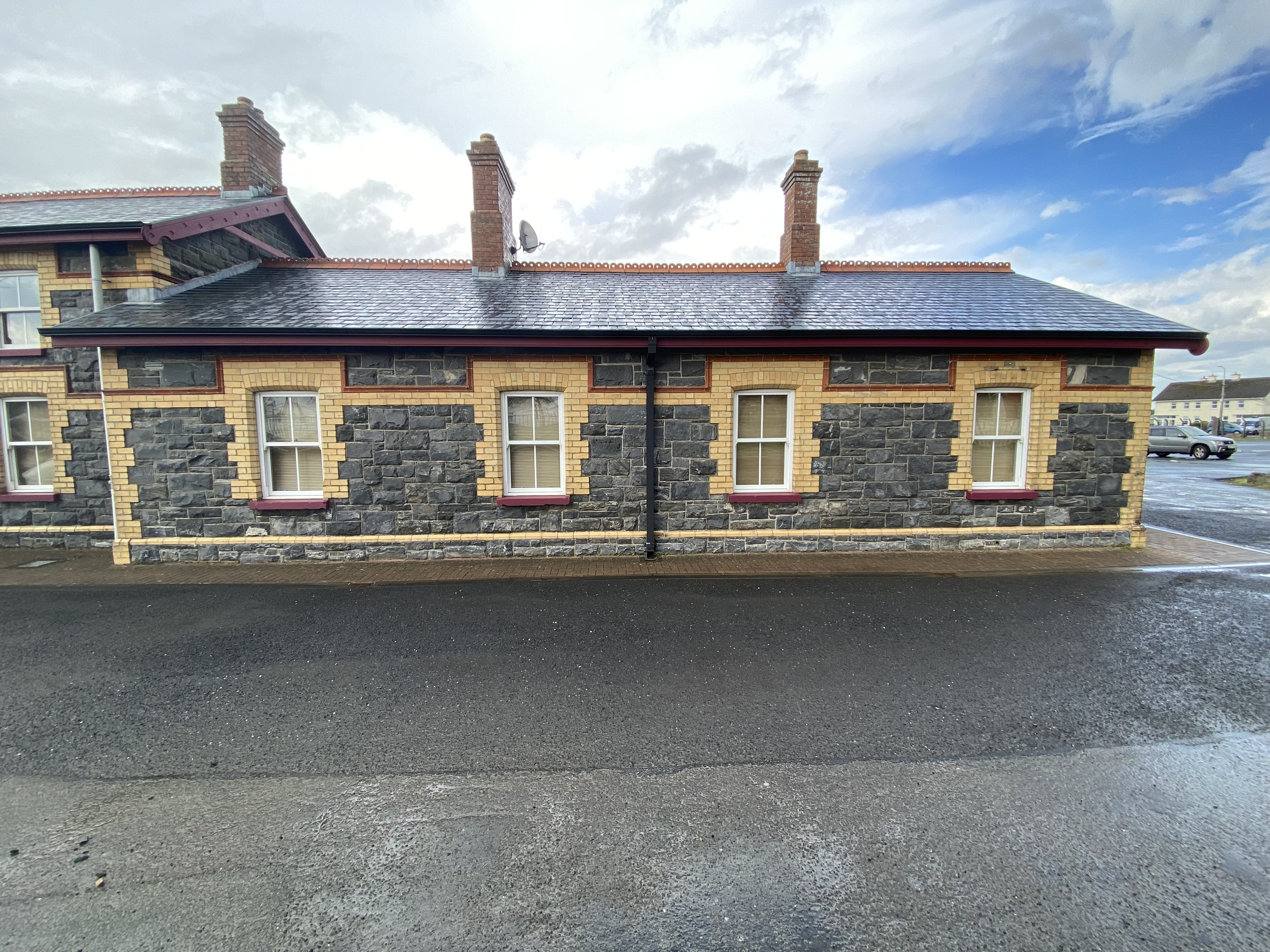
The road side of the station itself.

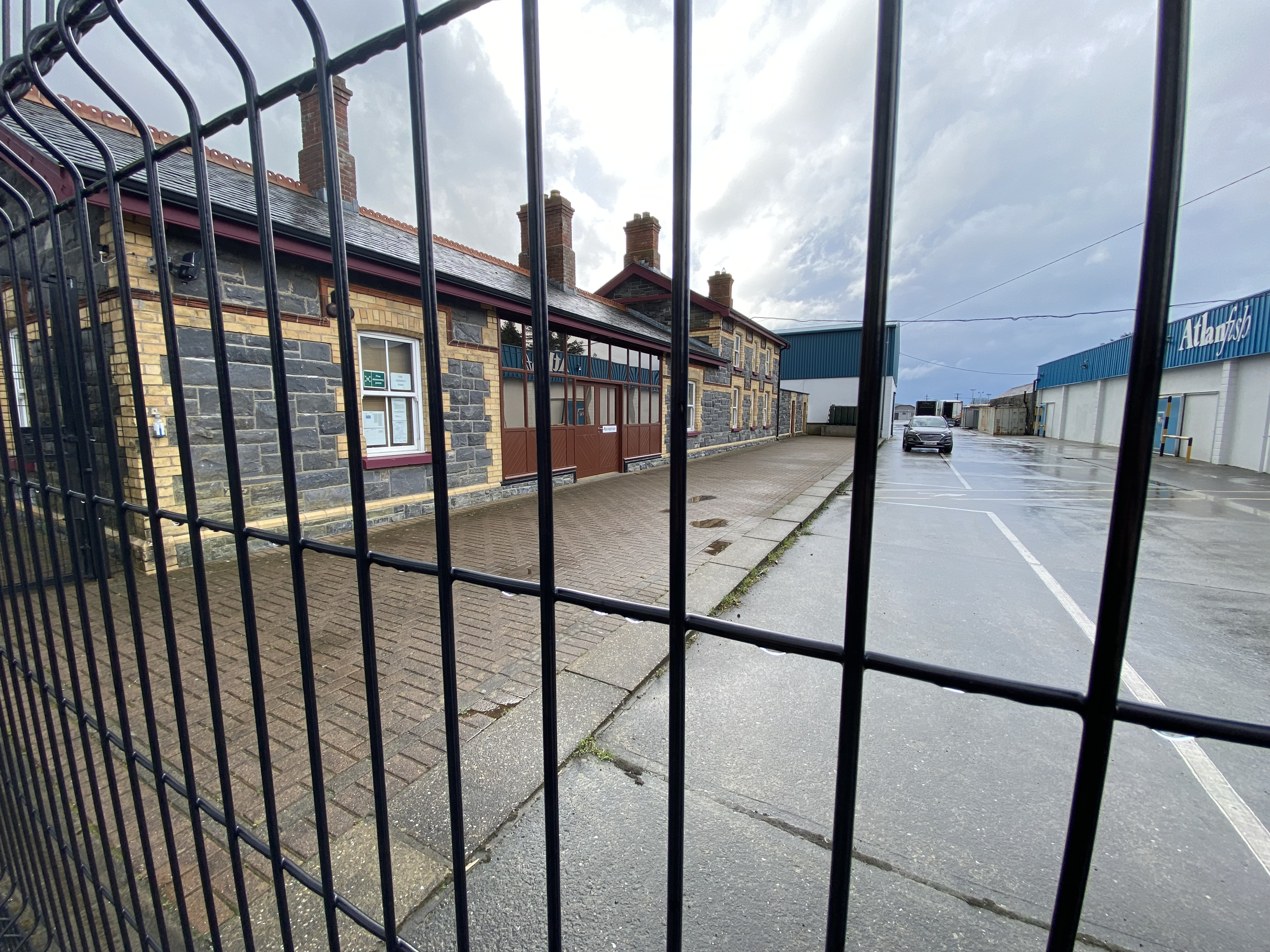
The platform side of the station, now offices, showing the door to the station, rear of the stationmaster's house and a storage shed on the far right.

== Routes ==
Preceding station	Disused railways	Following station
Carndonagh Halt	Londonderry and Lough Swilly Railway; Londonderry-Carndonagh	Terminus
