= Newmills railway station =

Disused railway station in County Donegal, Ireland

Newmills

General information
- Location: County Donegal; Ireland

History
- Original company: Londonderry and Lough Swilly Railway
- Post-grouping: Londonderry and Lough Swilly Railway

Key dates
- 9 March 1903: Station opens
- 3 June 1940: Station closes

Newmills railway station served the village of Newmills in County Donegal, Ireland.

The station opened on 9 March 1903 when the Londonderry and Lough Swilly Railway opened their Letterkenny and Burtonport Extension Railway, from Letterkenny to Burtonport. It closed on 3 June 1940 when the LLSR closed the line from Tooban Junction to Burtonport in an effort to save money.

== Routes ==
Preceding station	Disused railways	Following station
Old Town	Londonderry and Lough Swilly Railway	Churchill
