= Burtonport railway station =

Railway station serving the fishing village of Burtonport in County Donegal, Ireland

Burtonport Ailt an Chorráin

General information
- Location: Burtonport, County Donegal; Ireland
- Coordinates: 54.98135°N 8.43957°W
- Elevation: 14 ft (4.3 m)

History
- Original company: Londonderry and Lough Swilly Railway
- Post-grouping: Londonderry and Lough Swilly Railway

Key dates
- 9 March 1903: Station opens
- 3 June 1940: Station closes
Location

Burtonport railway station served the fishing village of Burtonport in County Donegal, Ireland.

The station opened on 9 March 1903 when the Londonderry and Lough Swilly Railway opened their Letterkenny and Burtonport Extension Railway, from Letterkenny to Burtonport. It closed on 3 June 1940 when the LLSR closed the line from Tooban Junction to Burtonport in an effort to save money.

== Routes ==
Preceding station	Disused railways	Following station
Dungloe	Londonderry and Lough Swilly Railway	Terminus
