= Dungloe railway station =

Former station in County Donegal, Ireland

Dungloe An Clochán Liath

General information
- Location: Crickamore, County Donegal; Ireland
- Coordinates: 54.976688°N 8.405°W
- Elevation: 27 ft (8.2 m)
- Platforms: 1
- Tracks: 1

Construction
- Structure type: Station house (extant) and goods shed

History
- Original company: Londonderry and Lough Swilly Railway
- Post-grouping: Londonderry and Lough Swilly Railway

Key dates
- 9 March 1903: Station opens as Lough Meala
- 1 November 1903: Station renamed Dungloe Road (Lough Meala)
- 1 June 1904: Station renamed Dungloe (Lough Meala)
- 1 March 1909: Station renamed Dungloe
- 3 June 1940: Station closes
Location

Dungloe railway station was located north of Lough Meela, about 5 km from the town of Dungloe in County Donegal, Ireland.

The station opened on 9 March 1903 when the Londonderry and Lough Swilly Railway opened their Letterkenny and Burtonport Extension Railway, from Letterkenny to Burtonport. It closed on 3 June 1940 when the LLSR closed the line from Tooban Junction to Burtonport in an effort to save money.

== Routes ==
Preceding station	Disused railways	Following station
Kincasslagh Road	Londonderry and Lough Swilly Railway	Burtonport
