= Creeslough railway station =

Railway station in County Donegal, Ireland

Creeslough

General information
- Location: Creeslough, County Donegal; Ireland

History
- Original company: Londonderry and Lough Swilly Railway
- Post-grouping: Londonderry and Lough Swilly Railway

Key dates
- 9 March 1903: Station opens
- 3 June 1940: Station closes to passengers
- 6 January 1947: Station closes

Creeslough railway station served the village of Creeslough in County Donegal in Ulster, Ireland.

The station opened on 9 March 1903 when the Londonderry and Lough Swilly Railway opened their Letterkenny and Burtonport Extension Railway, from Letterkenny to Burtonport. It closed to passengers on 3 June 1940 when the LLSR closed the line from Tooban Junction to Burtonport in an effort to save money and then closed completely on 1 June 1947.

== Routes ==
| Preceding station | Disused railways | Following station |
|---|---|---|
| Barnes Halt | Londonderry and Lough Swilly Railway | Dunfanaghy |
