= Barnes Halt railway station =

Railway station in Ireland

Barnes Halt
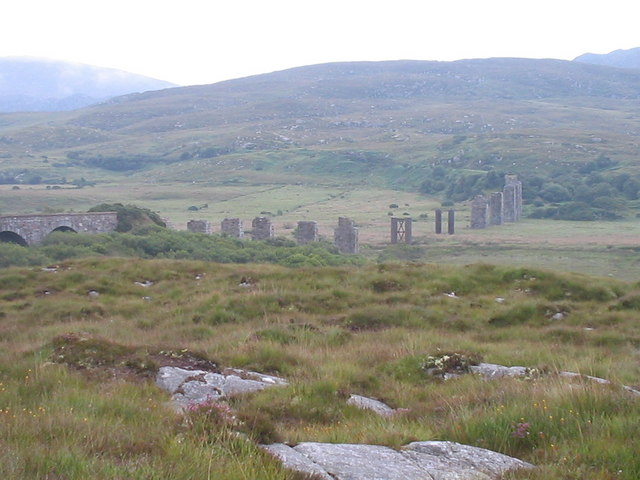

General information
- Location: County Donegal; Ireland
- Coordinates: 55.08°N 7.87°W

History
- Original company: Londonderry and Lough Swilly Railway
- Post-grouping: Londonderry and Lough Swilly Railway

Key dates
- 1 December 1928: Station opens
- 3 June 1940: Station closes
Location
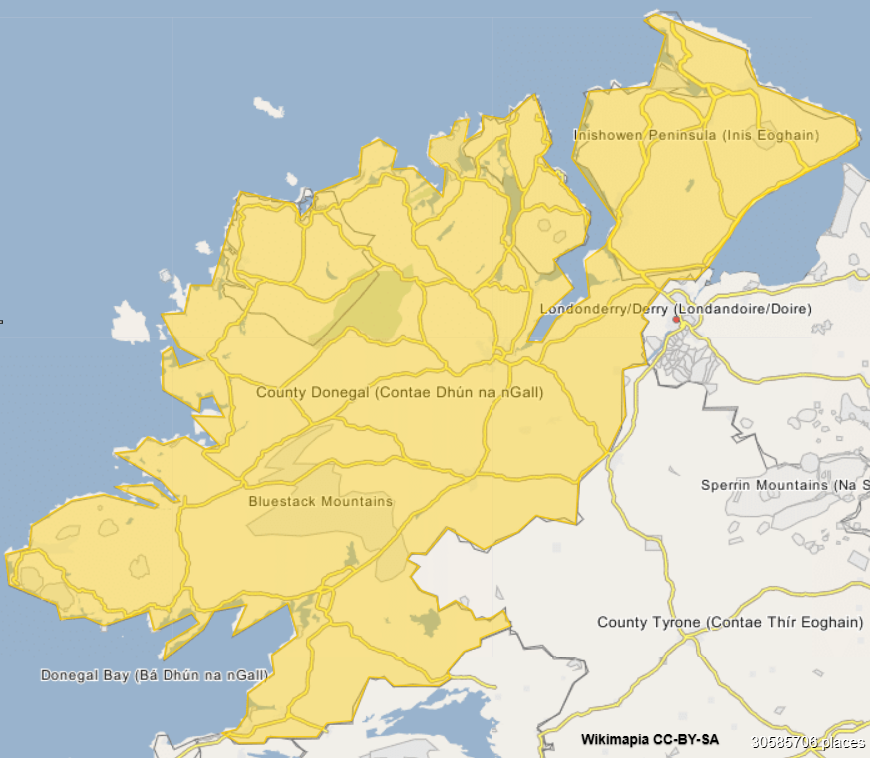
- Location within County Donegal Location within Ireland

Barnes Halt railway station served a location midway between Creeslough and Kilmacrenan in County Donegal, Ireland.

Barnes Halt was not a 'station' in the ordinary sense. It was simply a stopping point at the level crossing across the Kilmacrennan-Creeslough road, a few miles north of Termon. There was no station building or platforms, only the embankment on which the rail track ran, and the house occupied by the railway employee responsible for manning the level crossing gates.

The station opened on 9 March 1903 when the Londonderry and Lough Swilly Railway opened their Letterkenny and Burtonport Extension Railway, from Letterkenny to Burtonport. It closed on 3 June 1940 when the LLSR closed the line from Tooban Junction to Burtonport in an effort to save money. In 1925 there four passengers were killed when, in a strong storm, some carriages of the train were blown off the Owencarrow viaduct.

== Routes ==
Preceding station	Disused railways	Following station
Kilmacrennan	Londonderry and Lough Swilly Railway	Creeslough
