= Kincasslagh Road railway station =

Railway station in Ireland

Kincasslagh Road

General information
- Location: Meenbanad, County Donegal; Ireland
- Coordinates: 54.98955°N 8.383106°W
- Elevation: 106 ft (32 m)

Construction
- Structure type: Halt
- Platform levels: 1

History
- Original company: Londonderry and Lough Swilly Railway
- Post-grouping: Londonderry and Lough Swilly Railway

Key dates
- 1 October 1913: Station opens
- 3 June 1940: Station closes
Location

Kincasslagh Road railway station was a halt which served the townland of Meenbanad in County Donegal, Ireland.

The halt was located on the northern shore of Lough Atercan, at the level crossing on the road to Kincasslagh, 3 miles away.

The station opened on 1 October 1913 when the Londonderry and Lough Swilly Railway opened their Letterkenny and Burtonport Extension Railway, from Letterkenny to Burtonport. It closed on 3 June 1940 when the LLSR closed the line from Tooban Junction to Burtonport in an effort to save money.

== Routes ==
Preceding station	Disused railways	Following station
Crolly	Londonderry and Lough Swilly Railway	Dungloe
