= Carrowen railway station =

Railway Station in County Donegal, Ireland

Coordinates: 55.0325°N 7.4883°W

Carrowen

General information
- Location: Carrowen, County Donegal; Ireland

History
- Original company: Londonderry and Lough Swilly Railway
- Post-grouping: Londonderry and Lough Swilly Railway

Key dates
- 1 December 1883: Station opens
- 3 June 1940: Station closes
Location
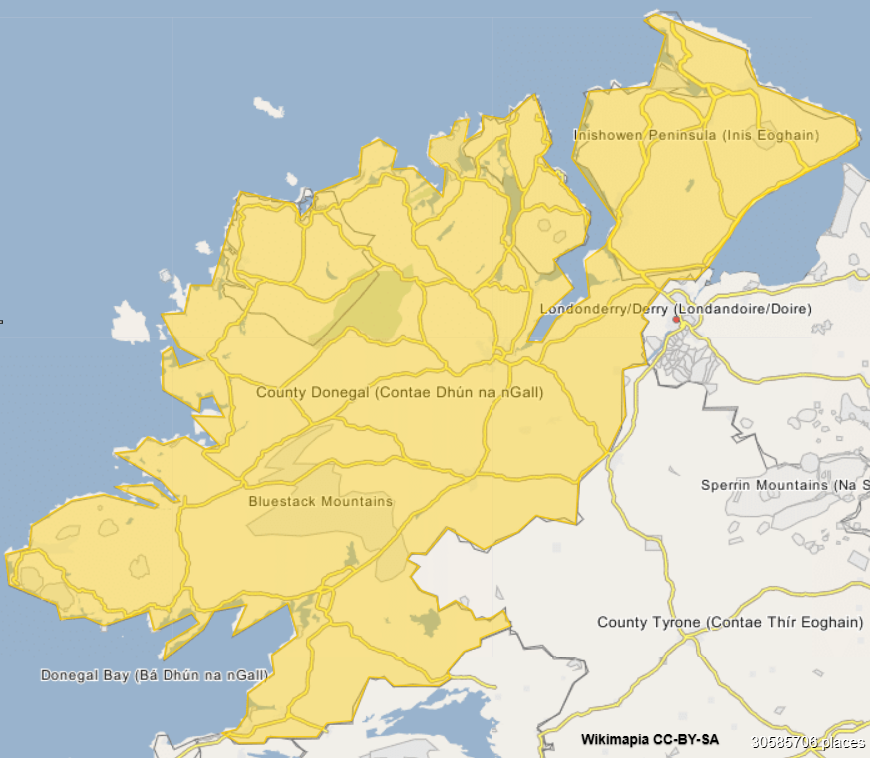
- Location within County Donegal Location within Ireland

Carrowen Railway Station served Carrowen in County Donegal, Ireland.

The station opened on 1 December 1883 when the Londonderry and Lough Swilly Railway built their line from Londonderry Graving Dock to Letterkenny (LLS).

It closed for passengers on 3 June 1940.

It remained open for freight until 10 August 1953.

== Routes ==
Preceding station	Disused railways	Following station
Trady	Londonderry and Lough Swilly Railway; Londonderry-Letterkenny	Newtowncunningham
