= Sallybrook railway station =

Railway station in Ireland

Coordinates: 54.9534°N 7.5735°W

Sallybrook

General information
- Location: Sallybrook, County Donegal; Ireland

History
- Original company: Londonderry and Lough Swilly Railway
- Post-grouping: Londonderry and Lough Swilly Railway

Key dates
- 1 May 1885: Station opens
- 3 June 1940: Station closes
Location

Sallybrook railway station served Sallybrook in County Donegal, Ireland.

The station opened on 1 May 1885 when the Londonderry and Lough Swilly Railway built their line from Londonderry Graving Dock to Letterkenny (LLS).

It closed for passengers on 3 June 1940.

It remained open for freight until 10 August 1953.

== Routes ==
Preceding station	Disused railways	Following station
Newtowncunningham	Londonderry and Lough Swilly Railway; Londonderry-Letterkenny	Manorcunningham
