= Cashelnagore railway station =

Railway station in County Donegal, Ireland

Cashelnagore

General information
- Location: Cashelnagore, County Donegal; Ireland

History
- Original company: Londonderry and Lough Swilly Railway
- Post-grouping: Londonderry and Lough Swilly Railway

Key dates
- 9 March 1903: Station opens
- 3 June 1940: Station closes

Cashelnagore railway station served the village of Cashelnagore in County Donegal, Ireland.

The station opened on 9 March 1903 when the Londonderry and Lough Swilly Railway opened their Letterkenny and Burtonport Extension Railway, from Letterkenny to Burtonport. It closed on 3 June 1940 when the LLSR closed the line from Tooban Junction to Burtonport in an effort to save money. It was used in the 1992 film The Railway Station Man.

== Routes ==
Preceding station	Disused railways	Following station
Falcarragh	Londonderry and Lough Swilly Railway	Gweedore
