= Oldtown railway station =

Railway station in Ireland

Oldtown
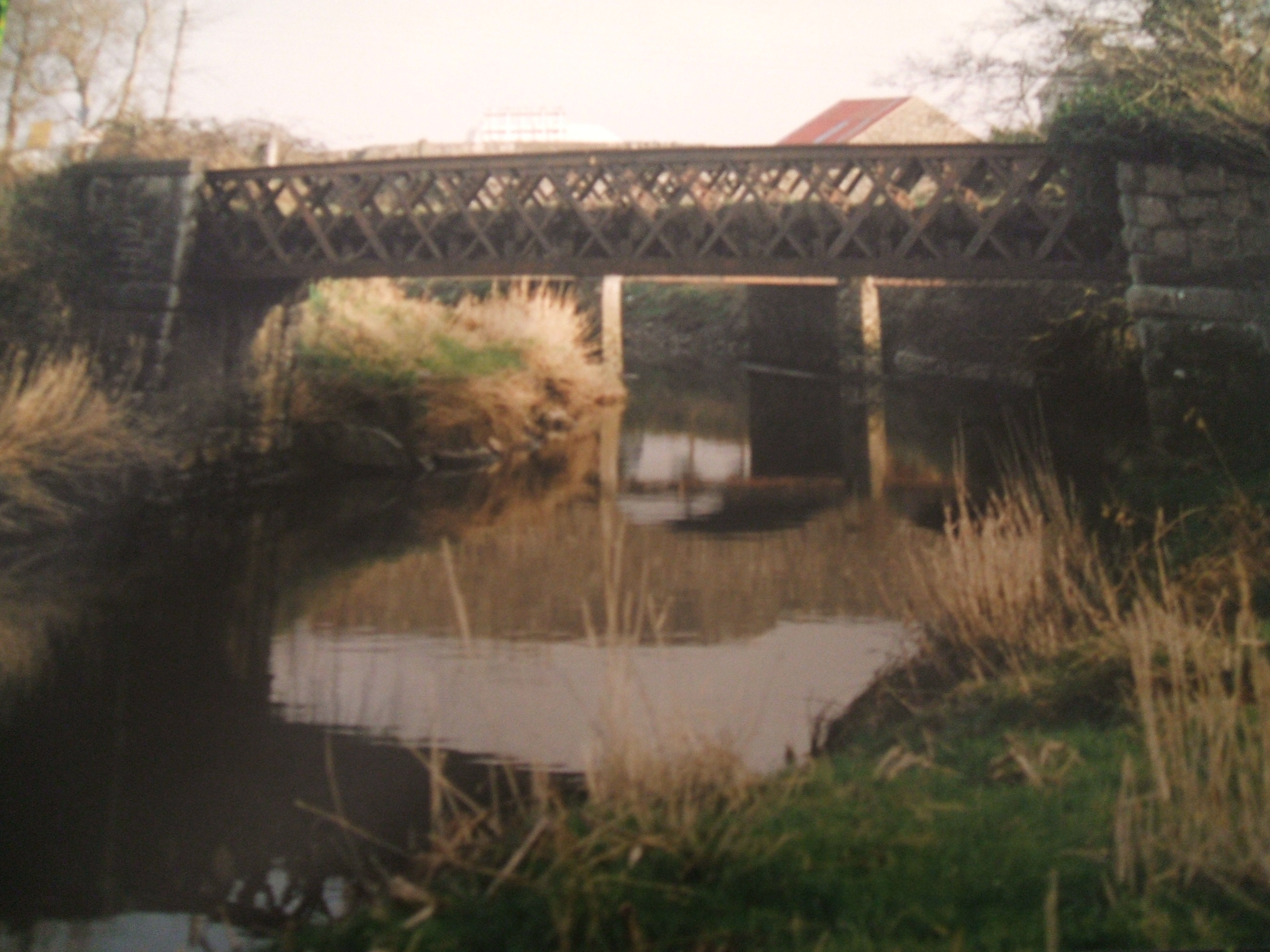
- Only remaining evidence of Oldtown railway station

General information
- Location: Pearse Rd.oldtown road. Oldtown, Letterkenny, County Donegal; Ireland
- Coordinates: 54.945644°N 7.740319°E
- Elevation: 14 ft (4.3 m)
- Platforms: 1
- Tracks: 1

History
- Original company: Londonderry and Lough Swilly Railway
- Post-grouping: Londonderry and Lough Swilly Railway

Key dates
- 9 March 1903: Station opens
- 6 January 1947/8: Station closes
Location

Oldtown railway station served the district of Oldtown, Letterkenny in County Donegal, Ireland.

The station opened on 9 March 1903 when the Londonderry and Lough Swilly Railway opened their Letterkenny and Burtonport Extension Railway, from Letterkenny to Burtonport. It closed in 1947 when the LLSR closed the line from Tooban Junction to Burtonport in an effort to save money.

== Routes ==
Preceding station	Disused railways	Following station
Letterkenny (LLS)	Londonderry and Lough Swilly Railway	Newmills
