= Manorcunningham railway station =

Station in County Donegal, Ireland

Manorcunningham

General information
- Location: Manorcunningham, County Donegal; Ireland
- Coordinates: 54.93559°N 7.60748°W

History
- Original company: Londonderry and Lough Swilly Railway
- Post-grouping: Londonderry and Lough Swilly Railway

Key dates
- 30 June 1883: Station opens
- 3 June 1940: Station closes (passengers)
- 10 August 1953: Station closes (freight)
Location

Manorcunningham railway station served Manorcunningham in County Donegal, Ireland. It was 2 km south-east of Manorcunningham.

The station opened on 30 June 1883 when the Londonderry and Lough Swilly Railway built their line from Londonderry Graving Dock to Letterkenny (LLS).

It closed for passengers on 3 June 1940.

It remained open for freight until 10 August 1953.

The station building, still largely intact, has been converted into a private residence.

== Routes ==
Preceding station	Disused railways	Following station
Sallybrook	Londonderry and Lough Swilly Railway; Londonderry-Letterkenny	Pluck
