= Burnfoot, County Donegal =

Village in County Donegal, Ireland

Burnfoot Bun na hAbhann
- Village
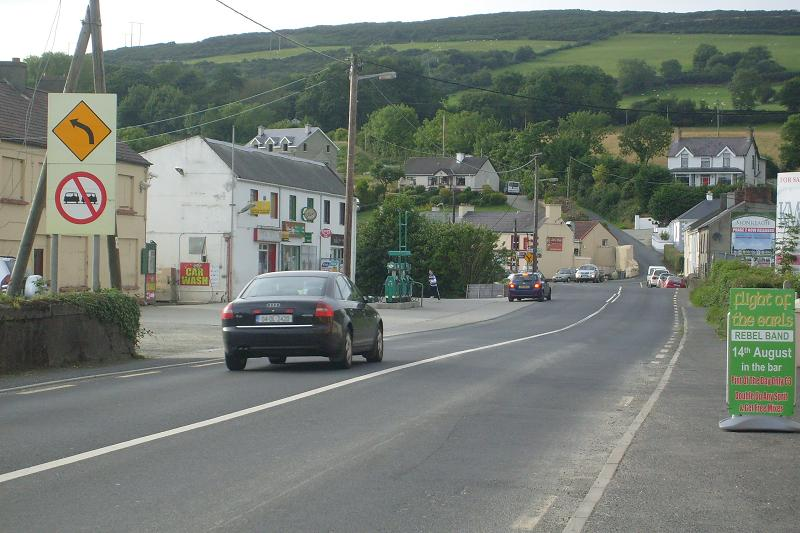

- Location in Ireland
- Coordinates: 55°03′31″N 7°24′18″W
- Country: Ireland
- Province: Ulster
- County: County Donegal

Government
  - Dáil Éireann: Donegal

Population (2022)
  - Total: 413
- Time zone: UTC+0 (WET)
  - Summer (DST): UTC-1 (IST (WEST))

Burnfoot (Irish: Bun na hAbhann) is a small village on the Inishowen peninsula in County Donegal, Republic of Ireland. It lies within the townland of Ballyderowen. It has a few local shops and a pub. As of 2022, the population was 413.

== History ==
The name of Burnfoot is believed to have originated from Scottish settlers using "Burn", the Scots language term for a small river, giving it the translated title of "Foot of the River". A large portion of the land near Burnfoot was reclaimed from Lough Swilly in the 19th century. It was originally planned to cut a channel for a canal from the sea near Derry to Burnfoot so that the village could access Londonderry Port, though this plan was not carried out due to the costs involved estimated by the proposed architect Sir John Rennie the Younger. Burnfoot is on the border with County Londonderry, Northern Ireland. It formerly had a railway station operated by the Londonderry & Lough Swilly Railway. This station was open from 1864 until 1948 when it was closed.

Burnfoot was badly flooded in flash floods in August 2017. This event caused flooding across the Inishowen peninsula and has been described as a ‘one in two-thousand-year flooding event’. The Irish Office of Public Works and Donegal County Council have plans to build a flood relief scheme is designed to protect the village.

In 2004, Philip O'Doherty, set up a production facility for E&I Engineering, a company he founded in Derry in 1986. The Burnfoot facility subsequently grew to become the global headquarters with over 1,000 people in a 300,000 sq ft production facility locally in Burnfoot and over 2,100 staff globally. It creates electrical switchgear and power distribution systems for data centres. It was acquired by US based Vertiv Holdings in 2021.

In March 2025, an application was made to Donegal County Council to build a water park in Burnfoot. In April 2025, An Post opted to centralise its postal sorting facilities in Inishowen into a new delivery office in Burnfoot. There is a small industrial estate. Burnfoot is also home to Wild Ireland, an animal sanctuary that includes Irish bears, wolves and monkeys.
