= Inch Road railway station =

Railway station in Ireland

Inch Road

General information
- Location: Magherabeg, County Donegal; Ireland
- Coordinates: 55.06315°N 7.4518°W
- Elevation: 22 ft (6.7 m)
- Platforms: 1
- Tracks: 1

History
- Opened: 9 September 1864
- Original company: Londonderry and Lough Swilly Railway
- Post-grouping: Londonderry and Lough Swilly Railway

Key dates
- 6 September 1948: Station closes to passengers
- 10 August 1953: Station closes to freight
Location

Inch Road railway station served Magherabeg in County Donegal, Ireland.

The station opened on 9 September 1864 on the Londonderry and Lough Swilly Railway line from Londonderry Graving Dock to Carndonagh.

It closed for passengers on 6 September 1948.

== Routes ==
Preceding station	Disused railways	Following station
Tooban Junction	Londonderry and Lough Swilly Railway; Londonderry- Carndonagh	Lamberton's Halt
