= Buncrana railway station =

Station in County Donegal, Ireland

Coordinates: 55.1275°N 7.4573°W

Buncrana

General information
- Location: Buncrana, County Donegal; Ireland

History
- Original company: Londonderry and Lough Swilly Railway
- Post-grouping: Londonderry and Lough Swilly Railway

Key dates
- 9 September 1864: Station opens
- 6 September 1948: Station closes for passengers
- 10 August 1953: Station closes
Location
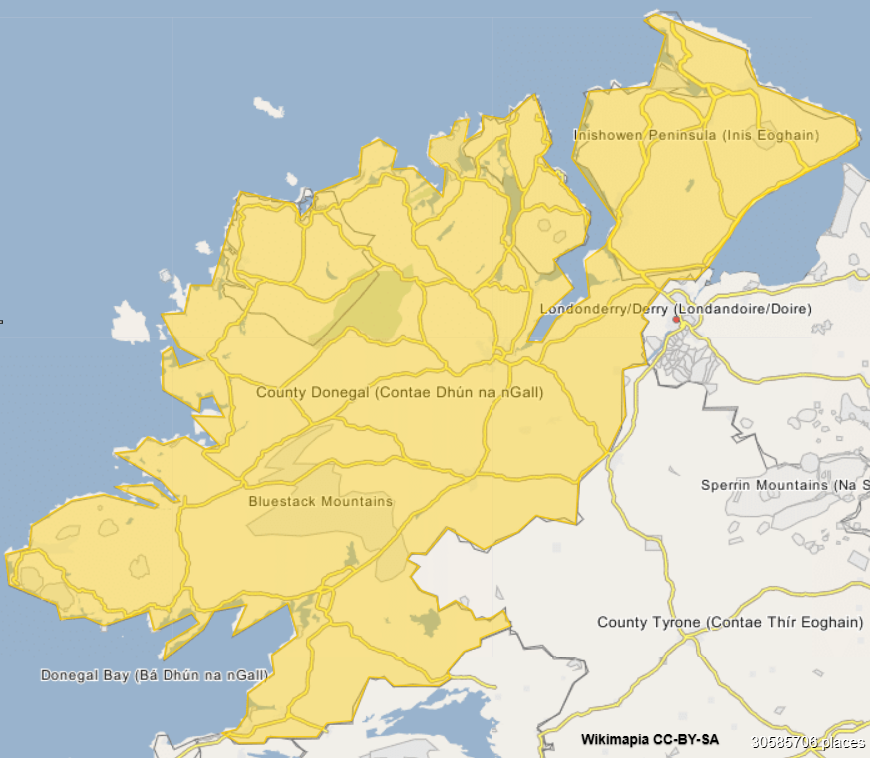
- Location within County Donegal Location within Ireland

Buncrana railway station served Buncrana in County Donegal, Ireland.

== History ==
The station opened on 9 September 1864 on the Londonderry and Lough Swilly Railway line from Londonderry Graving Dock to Buncrana. It was designed by the Derry architect Fitzgibbon Louch.

The main station building was burned down in August 1903. A servant girl living the station accidentally upset oil lamp over the refreshment rooms, and in a few minutes the whole building was ablaze. The station master rescued his wife and family, and also got out some the railway papers. The damage to the station was estimated to be £5,000 in 1903 prices.

On 4 September 1905, the front axle of a train approaching the station suddenly broke. The train overran the station and the points were torn up for a considerable distance. Although no one was injured in the accident, the station was forced to close until repairs were made.

An 18-year-old engine cleaner — Hugh McLaughlin from Londonderry — was found dead in the station pump room on 9 December 1909. He lit a fire in the room for warmth and then went to sleep. However, there was no outlet for the smoke and McLaughlin died of smoke inhalation.

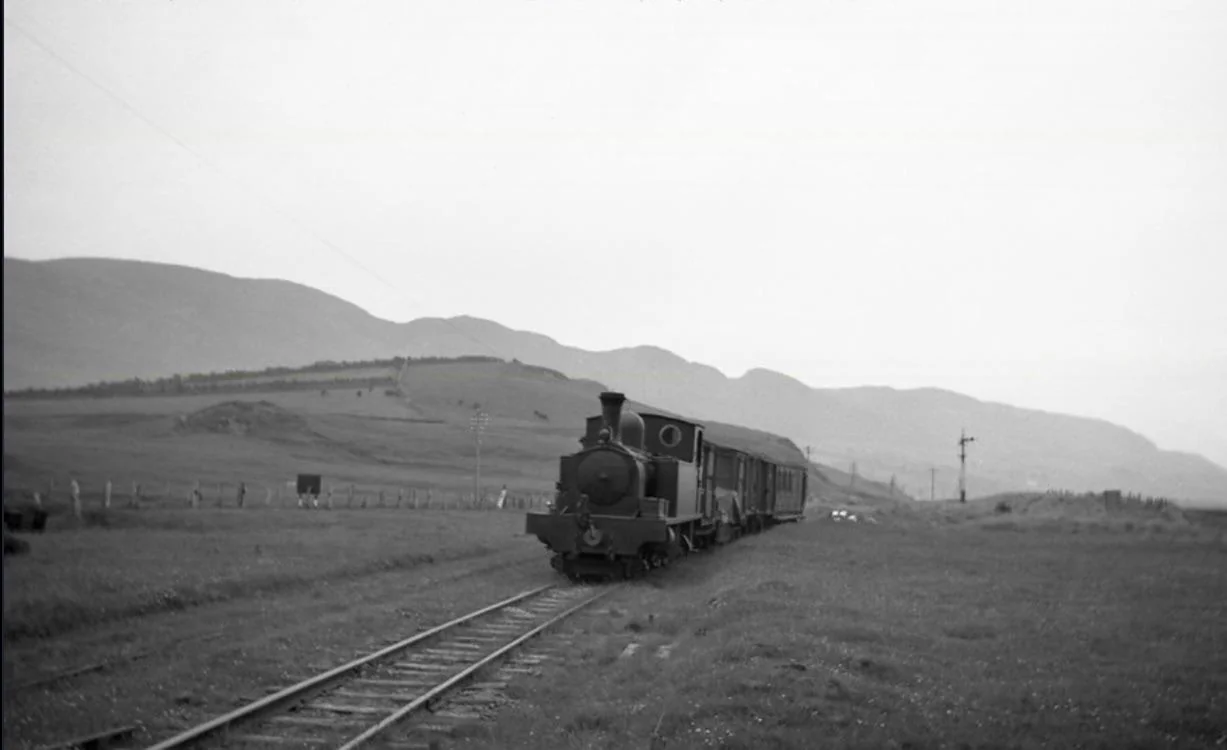
L&LSR 4-6-0T Engine No.3 approaching Buncrana at the lower links. Fahan hill and the Barrack hill in the background.

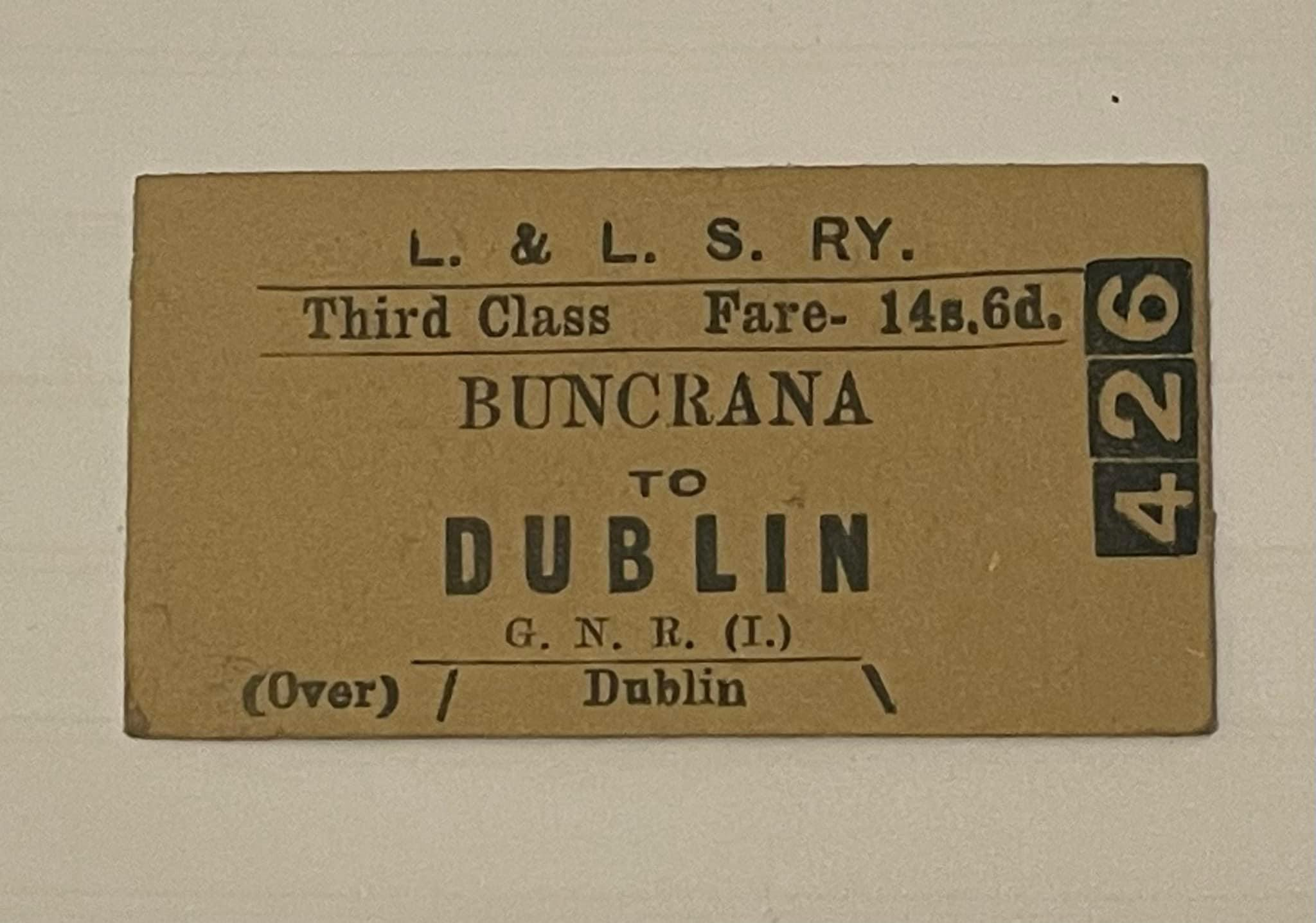
Undated railway ticket for the journey from Buncrana to Dublin. It was issued before 1948, when passenger services were terminated.

On 30 July 1922, during the Irish Civil War, Buncrana was captured by the Free State forces from Anti-treaty forces. The Free State forces held the railway station and all the roads entering the town. Later that day, 100 Free State troops commandeered a train at Buncrana station and proceeded to take Clonmany, Carndonagh and other locations on the peninsula.

The station closed for passengers on 6 September 1948. In December 1952, the Irish minister of industry and commerce signed an order authorizing the closure of rail services to Buncrana. Freight services were finally terminated on 10 August 1953.

== Post railway use ==
The station buildings still exist. They were purchased in 1952 by Dan and Molly Porter and have been converted to a public house – The Drift Inn. It is recorded on the Record of Protected Structures in the National Inventory of Architectural Heritage of Ireland.

== Routes ==
Preceding station	Disused railways	Following station
Lisfannon Links Halt	Londonderry and Lough Swilly Railway; Londonderry- Carndonagh	Ballymagan
