= Burnfoot railway station =

Railway station in Ireland

Coordinates: 55.0572°N 7.4084°W

Burnfoot

General information
- Location: Burnfoot, County Donegal, County Donegal; Ireland

History
- Original company: Londonderry and Lough Swilly Railway
- Post-grouping: Londonderry and Lough Swilly Railway

Key dates
- 12 November 1881: Station opens
- 6 September 1948: Station closes
Location

Burnfoot railway station served Burnfoot in County Donegal in the Republic of Ireland.

The Londonderry and Lough Swilly Railway opened the station on 12 November 1881.

It closed on 6 September 1948.

== Routes ==
Preceding station	Disused railways	Following station
Bridge End	Londonderry and Lough Swilly Railway; Derry to Farland Point	Tooban Junction
