= Lisfannon Links Halt railway station =

Railway station in Ireland

Lisfannon Links Halt

General information
- Location: County Donegal; Ireland

History
- Original company: Londonderry and Lough Swilly Railway
- Post-grouping: Londonderry and Lough Swilly Railway

Key dates
- 1892: Station opens
- 6 September 1948: Station closes

Lisfannon Links Halt railway station served Lisfannon Golf Course in County Donegal, Ireland.

The station opened in 1892 on the Londonderry and Lough Swilly Railway line from Londonderry Graving Dock to Carndonagh.

It closed for passengers on 6 September 1948.

== Routes ==
Preceding station	Disused railways	Following station
Beach Halt	Londonderry and Lough Swilly Railway; Londonderry- Carndonagh	Buncrana
