= Fahan railway station =

Railway station in Ireland

Fahan
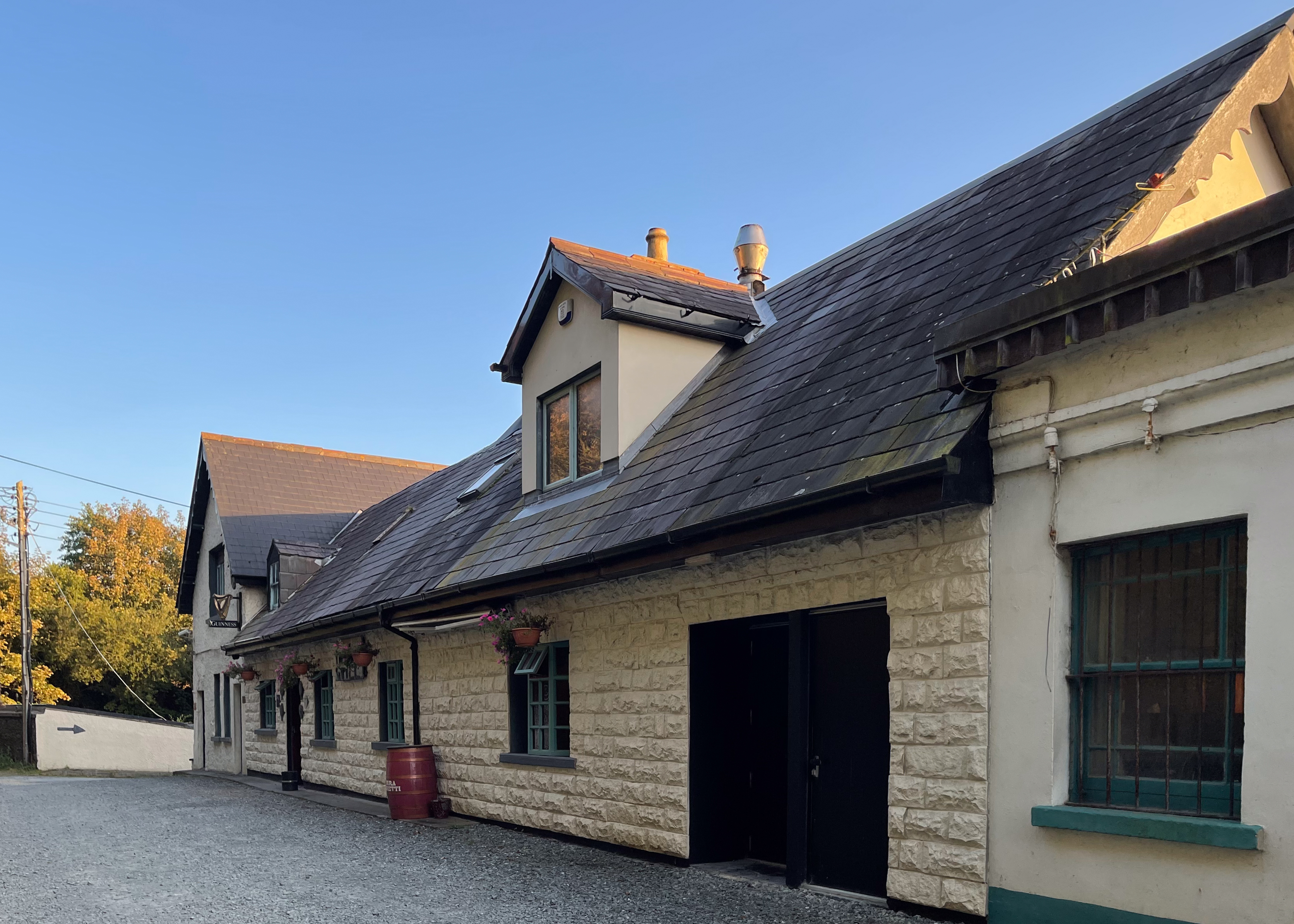
- Former railway station building on the side of the (now dismantled) railway

General information
- Location: Station Rd. Fahan, County Donegal; Ireland
- Coordinates: 55°05′N 7°29′W
- Elevation: 24 ft (7.3 m)

History
- Opened: 19 September 1864
- Closed: 6 September 1948
- Original company: Londonderry and Lough Swilly Railway
- Post-grouping: Londonderry and Lough Swilly Railway
Location

Fahan railway station served Fahan in County Donegal, Ireland.

The station opened on 19 September 1864 on the Londonderry and Lough Swilly Railway line from Londonderry Graving Dock to Carndonagh. Facilities included a goods shed, cattle pens and a spur to the end of the original Fahan Pier.

In January 1881 one James Bond was appointed Station Master to replace his predecessor who had been dismissed. It is reputed SM Bond in 1885 erected a small windmill powering a dynamo to generate electricity to light the station.

It closed for passengers on 6 September 1948.

After its closure as a railway station, the building continues to in use as a restaurant and pub, named the 'Railway Tavern & Firebox Grill'.

== Routes ==
Preceding station	Disused railways	Following station
Lamberton's Halt	Londonderry and Lough Swilly Railway; Londonderry- Carndonagh	Beach Halt
