= Kinnego Halt railway station =

Station in County Donegal, Ireland

Kinnego Halt

General information
- Location: Kinnego, County Donegal; Ireland

History
- Original company: Londonderry and Lough Swilly Railway
- Post-grouping: Londonderry and Lough Swilly Railway

Key dates
- 1 November 1929: Station opens
- 2 December 1935: Station closes

Kinnego railway station served Kinnego in County Donegal, Ireland.

The station opened on 1 November 1929 on the Londonderry and Lough Swilly Railway line from Londonderry Graving Dock to Carndonagh.

It closed for passengers on 2 December 1935.

== Routes ==
Preceding station	Disused railways	Following station
Ballymagan	Londonderry and Lough Swilly Railway; Londonderry- Carndonagh	Drumfries
