= Trady railway station =

Railway station in Ireland

Trady

General information
- Location: County Donegal; Ireland

History
- Original company: Londonderry and Lough Swilly Railway
- Post-grouping: Londonderry and Lough Swilly Railway

Key dates
- 12 September 1864: Station opens
- 1 August 1866: Station closes

Trady railway station served an area between Tooban and Farland Point in County Donegal, Ireland.

The station opened on 12 December 1864 when the Londonderry and Lough Swilly Railway built their line from Londonderry Middle Quay to Farland Point.

It closed on 1 August 1866.

== Routes ==
Preceding station	Disused railways	Following station
Tooban Junction	Londonderry and Lough Swilly Railway	Farland Point
