= Beach Halt railway station (Ireland) =

Railway station in Ireland

Beach Halt

General information
- Location: County Donegal; Ireland

History
- Original company: Londonderry and Lough Swilly Railway
- Post-grouping: Londonderry and Lough Swilly Railway

Key dates
- 1939: Station opens
- 6 September 1948: Station closes

Beach Halt railway station was an unlisted stop just south of Lisfannon Golf Course in County Donegal, Ireland.

The station opened in 1939 on the Londonderry and Lough Swilly Railway line from Londonderry Graving Dock to Carndonagh.

It closed for passengers on 6 September 1948.

== Routes ==
Preceding station	Disused railways	Following station
Fahan	Londonderry and Lough Swilly Railway; Londonderry- Carndonagh	Lisfannon Links Halt
