= Lamberton's Halt railway station =

Railway station in Ireland

Lamberton's Halt

General information
- Location: Magherabeg, County Donegal; Ireland
- Coordinates: 55.071561°N 7.454805°W
- Elevation: 4.5 ft (1.4 m)

History
- Opened: 1 June 1928
- Closed: 6 September 1948
- Original company: Londonderry and Lough Swilly Railway
- Post-grouping: Londonderry and Lough Swilly Railway
Location

Lamberton's Halt railway station served the townland of Magherabeg in County Donegal, Ireland.

The station opened on 1 June 1928 on the Londonderry and Lough Swilly Railway line from Londonderry Graving Dock to Carndonagh.

It closed for passengers on 6 September 1948.

== Routes ==
Preceding station	Disused railways	Following station
Inch Road	Londonderry and Lough Swilly Railway; Londonderry- Carndonagh	Fahan
