= Farland Point railway station =

Railway station in Ireland

Farland Point

General information
- Location: County Donegal; Ireland

History
- Original company: Londonderry and Lough Swilly Railway

Key dates
- 12 September 1864: Station opens
- 1 August 1866: Station closes

Farland Point railway station is a disused railway station that served Farland Point in County Donegal, Ireland.

The station opened on 12 December 1864 when the Londonderry and Lough Swilly Railway built its line from Londonderry Middle Quay railway station to Farland Point.

It closed on 1 August 1866.

== Routes ==
Preceding station	Disused railways	Following station
Trady	Londonderry and Lough Swilly Railway; Londonderry-Farland Point	Terminus
