= List of Irish railway accidents =

Railway accidents in Ireland

Bray Head, 1867

This sortable table lists railway accidents in the Republic of Ireland, and before its formation accidents in the provinces of Leinster, Munster and Connacht, plus the counties of Donegal, Cavan and Monaghan. It is currently limited to accidents where at least one train occupant was killed. It does not include acts of terror, nor accidents in Northern Ireland.

== Irish railway accidents with one or more train occupant fatalities ==
The 'TRA link' column gives a link to the accident's page on The Railways Archive web site, though some may not yet be fully detailed.

Date	Fatalities	Passenger fatalities	Injuries	Location	Description	TRA link	Company
2 December 1852	1	0	?	Bansha, County Tipperary	Passenger train derailed on poor track		W&L
5 October 1853	16	15	8	Straffan, County Kildare	1853 Straffan rail accident: Freight train hit rear of broken-down passenger train		GS&W
31 December 1853	2	0	6	Between Clonmel and Kilsheelan, County Tipperary	Derailment of passenger train		W&L
20 October 1855	1	1	0	Near Mallow, County Cork	Freight train broke into three portions; two collided, killing pig drover travelling as a passenger		GS&W
19 November 1856	5	0	?	Dunkitt, County Kilkenny	Passenger train misrouted into sidings & hit ballast train		W&K
9 October 1857	1	0	?	Carrigans, County Donegal	Mail train hit cow and derailed		L&E
29 October 1864	2	2	34	Ballinasloe, County Galway	Passenger train derailed due to excess speed on poor track		MGW
9 August 1867	2	2	25	Bray Head, County Wicklow	Sudden subsidence resulted in collapse at the Brandy Hole Viaduct; passenger train derailed		DWW
26 September 1874	1	1	28	Dundalk, County Louth	Collision on flat crossing		DBJ, INW
21 August 1875	1	0	1	Longpavement, County Limerick	Tyre of locomotive wheel broke, causing derailment of mixed train		W&L
30 October 1875	1	1	7	Castlebar, County Mayo	Empty cattle train struck rear of mixed train		MGW
4 July 1877	1	1	7	Dalkey, County Dublin	Passenger train derailed on unlocked facing points		DWW
27 February 1878	1	1	16	Glenageary, County Dublin	Wagons broke away from freight train and struck passenger train		DWW
8 September 1878	5	3	70	Curraheen, near Ballincollig, County Cork	Derailment of passenger train on poor track		C&MD
12 November 1879	1	0	?	Ballyhaise (then called Belturbet Junction), County Cavan	Mixed and cattle trains collided		GN
7 July 1887	1	0	3	Bantry, County Cork	Runaway train struck buffers		CBSC
22 May 1893	3	0	13	Curraduff, County Kerry	Runaway train crashed over bridge into river		T&D
6 August 1895	1	0	1	Between Avoca and Rathdrum, County Wicklow	Head-on collision of freight train and empty passenger train		DWW
24 November 1898	1	1	?	Lispole, County Kerry	Part of passenger train overturned by wind		T&D
24 April 1901	3	0	0	Tralee, County Kerry	Runaway freight train crashed through buffers		GS&W
11 April 1903	1	1	15	Between Ballymoe, County Galway, and Castlerea, County Roscommon	Passenger train struck axle from platelayer's trolley and derailed		MGW
8 September 1907	1	0	7	Kilrane, near Rosslare Harbour, County Wexford	Locomotive collided with passenger train		GS&W
13 March 1908	1	0	2	Maynooth, County Kildare	Mail train struck wagon standing foul of line		MGW
19 January 1910	1	0	1	Felthouse Junction, County Wexford	Derailment of freight train		GS&W
6 August 1910	2	0	0	Dundalk, County Louth	Passenger train collided with wagons		GN
5 August 1912	1	1	96	Lombardstown, County Cork	Passenger train derailed; excess speed on poor track		GS&W
8 January 1914	1	0	2	Birdhill, County Tipperary	Locomotive of mixed train derailed and overturned		GS&W
28 January 1915	2	2	6	Kinsale, County Cork	Runaway freight train collided with stationary mixed train		CBSC
19 December 1916	6	0	10	Kiltimagh, County Mayo	Head-on collision after ballast train passed signal at danger		GS&W
5 August 1921	1	0	5	Enniscorthy Tunnel, County Wexford	Collision between locomotive and permanent way trolley		D&SE
30 January 1925	4	4	9	Owencarrow, County Donegal	Owencarrow Viaduct Disaster—part of passenger train overturned by wind while crossing viaduct		L&LS
11 November 1941	2	0	0	Farranfore, County Kerry	Bridge washed away by flood; freight train derailed		GS
20 December 1944	1	0	?	Straboe, near Portlaoise, County Laois	Mail train passed signal at danger and hit failed cattle train		GS
29 August 1949	3	2	?	Donegal, County Donegal	Passenger train left station without train staff and collided head-on with freight train		CDRJC
21 December 1955	2	0	0	Cahir, County Tipperary	Runaway freight train derailed and fell through bridge		CIÉ
23 December 1957	1	0	4	Dundrum, County Dublin	Passenger train, delayed by cow on line, was struck from behind by second passenger train mistakenly signalled into section		CIÉ
21 October 1974	2	2	29	Gormanston, County Meath	Runaway empty passenger train collided with second empty train, which struck passenger train		CIÉ
31 December 1975	5	4	30	nr Gorey, County Wexford	Train derailed from bridge damaged by road vehicle		CIÉ
1 August 1980	18	16	75	Buttevant, County Cork	Buttevant Rail Disaster: Express sent into sidings as points not interlocked		CIÉ
31 October 1981	1	0	2	Ballymote, County Sligo	Collided with car on unattended level crossing		CIÉ
21 August 1983	7	7	55	Cherryville Junction, County Kildare	Collision into rear of broken-down train		CIÉ
24 September 1989	?	?	70	Claremorris, County Mayo	Collided with cattle on the line		CIÉ
30 September 1991	1	1	?	Ballycumber, County Offaly	Derailment of passenger train		IÉ

== See also ==
- Railway Accident Investigation Unit
- Armagh rail disaster
- Owencarrow Viaduct Disaster
- Lists of rail accidents
- List of rail accidents by country
