= Bridge End railway station (County Donegal) =

Railway station in County Donegal, Ireland

Bridge End

General information
- Location: Bridgend, County Donegal, County Donegal; Ireland
- Coordinates: 55.04°N 7.38°W

History
- Original company: Londonderry and Lough Swilly Railway
- Post-grouping: Londonderry and Lough Swilly Railway

Key dates
- 12 November 1881: Station opens
- 6 September 1948: Station closes
Location
- Location within Ireland

Bridge End railway station served Bridgend in County Donegal in the Republic of Ireland.

The Londonderry and Lough Swilly Railway opened the station on 12 November 1881.

It closed on 6 September 1948.

== Routes ==
Preceding station	Disused railways	Following station
Gallagh Road	Londonderry and Lough Swilly Railway; Derry to Farland Point	Burnfoot
