= Mark Tandy (actor) =

Irish actor

Mark Napper O'Connor Tandy is an Irish stage, film and television actor.

== Early life ==
Mark Tandy was born in Athlone, County Westmeath, Ireland on 8 February 1957. His childhood was spent between the Republic of Ireland and the Persian Gulf. He was educated at Winchester College and the University of Bristol Drama Department, and was a member of the National Youth Theatre from 1974 to 1976.

== Career ==
Tandy's first professional engagement in the theatre was for the Royal Shakespeare Company at Stratford-upon-Avon, England in 1979, where appearances included the original stage production of The Life and Adventures of Nicholas Nickleby, which played for three seasons at the Aldwych Theatre, London and at the Plymouth Theatre, New York. Tandy has since appeared irregularly at the National Theatre, the Royal Court Theatre, The Old Vic, London's West End and around the UK.

Tandy's first television role was as WB Yeats for the BBC in 1982, and many subsequent television appearances include The Jewel in the Crown, Inspector Morse, Portrait of a Marriage, Poirot, Absolutely Fabulous, Longitude, Evolution: Darwin's Dangerous Idea and Shackleton. Tandy appears as Cecil Beaton in the first two seasons of The Crown for Netflix.

Tandy first appeared on film as Viscount Risley in Merchant Ivory's Maurice. Other film appearances include Howards End, Defence of the Realm, Wings of Fame, Luzhin Defence, Bridget Jones: The Edge of Reason, Tristam Shandy: A Cock and Bull Story and Dad's Army.

== Selected filmography ==
- The Jewel in the Crown (1984, TV Series) - Gerry
- Murder Not Proven (1984, TV Series) - Edwin Rose
- Defence of the Realm (1985) - Philip Henderson
- Captive (1986) - Hammond
- Call Me Mister (1986, TV Series) - Sheridan Thurleigh
- Hedgehog Wedding (1987, TV Series) - Jamie
- Maurice (1987) - Lord Risley
- Hannay (1988, TV Series) - Cully
- Catherine (1988, TV Movie) - Dr Wishart
- A Vote for Hitler (1988, TV Movie) - Frank Pakenham
- Inspector Morse (1989, TV Series) - Mr. Collins
- Saracen (1989, TV Series) - Miles Gordon
- Wings of Fame (1990) - The Composer
- Portrait of a Marriage (1990, TV Mini-Series) - Reggie Cooper
- Duel of Hearts (1991, TV Movie) - Jackson
- A Time To Dance (1992, TV Mini-Series) - Professor Adams
- As Time Goes By (1992, TV Series) - Chas
- Howards End (1992) - Luncheon Guests
- The Railway Station Man (1992) - Manus Dempsey
- So Haunt Me (1993, TV Series) - Tom
- Eye of the Storm (1993, TV Mini-Series) - Barnes
- Absolutely Fabulous (1994, TV Series) - Mark
- Fall from Grace (1994, TV Movie) - Pilot
- Agatha Christie's Poirot (1995, Episode: "Hercule Poirot's Christmas") - Superintendent Sugden
- The Buccaneers (1995, TV Mini-Series) - Lord Seadown
- Kiss and Tell (1996, TV Movie) - Cheeseman
- A Touch of Frost (1997, TV Series) - Hotel Manager
- Food of Love (1997) - Robin
- Killer Net (1998, TV Mini-Series) - Robin Butler-Cook
- Liverpool One (1998, TV Series) - Guy Andrews
- Sophie's World (1998) - William Shakespeare
- The Waiting Time (1999, TV Movie) - Peter Vansittart
- Longitude (2000, TV Movie) - William Whiston
- The Luzhin Defence (2000) - Luzhin's father
- Claim (2002) - Peter van Hooijdonk
- The Biographer (2002, TV Movie) - Humphrey Craven
- Shackleton (2002, TV Mini-Series) - Frank Shackleton
- Evolution: Darwin's Dangerous Idea (2002, TV Mini-Series documentary) - Erasmus Darwin
- The Alan Clark Diaries (2004, TV Series) - Donald Derx
- Bridget Jones: The Edge of Reason (2004) - Derek
- Space Odyssey: Voyage To The Planets (2004, TV Movie) - Alex Lloyd, Chief Scientist
- Cherished (2005, TV Movie) - Paul Dunkels QC
- Hustle (2005, TV Series) - Gideon
- A Cock and Bull Story (2005) - London Doctor
- Hex (2005, TV Series) - Titus Peckham
- The Impressionists (2006, TV Series) - Judge #2
- Trial and Retribution (2007, TV Series) - Dr John Saunders
- New Tricks (2007, TV Series) - Colin Meadows
- The Unsinkable Titanic (2008, TV Movie documentary) - J. Bruce Ismay
- Minder (2009, TV Series) - Auctioneer
- Garrow's Law (2009, TV Series) - Dr. Herring
- Mr. Nice (2010) - Lord Hutchison QC
- Silk (2011, TV Series) - Judge Stephen Morris
- The Deep Blue Sea (2011) - Ede & Ravenscroft Assistant
- The Hollow Crown (2012, TV Series) - Sir Richard Vernon
- Silent Witness episode: "Coup de Grace" (2 parts) (2014, Series) - QC Harry Fraser
- Dad's Army (2016) - Major Cunningham
- The Limehouse Golem (2016) - Judge
- Goodbye Christopher Robin (2016) - Portrait Photographer
- The Foreigner (2016) - Simpson
- The Crown (2016-2017, TV Series) - Cecil Beaton
- The Last Post (2017, TV Mini-Series) - Colin Calvert
- Surviving Christmas with the Relatives (2018) - Vicar
- Widow Clicquot (2023)

== Selected theatre ==
- Nicholas Nickleby (1980) - Bolder, Mr. Pyke, Policeman, Master Crummles [Royal Shakespeare Company]
- Major Barbara (1982) - Charles Lomax [National Theatre]
- The Lucky Chance (1984) - Bredwell [Royal Court Theatre]
- The Importance of Being Earnest (1985) - John Worthing [Oxford Playhouse]
- Beauty and The Beast (1987) - Nosail [Old Vic]
- Siblings (1987) - Gerard [Lyric Theatre Hammersmith]
- Lady Windermere's Fan (1986) - Cecil Graham [Bristol Old Vic]
- Balmoral (1987) - Godfrey Winn [Bristol Old Vic]
- A Study in Scarlet (1989) - Sherlock Holmes [Greenwich Theatre]
- Beside Herself (1990) - Teddy [Royal Court Theatre]
- The Clandestine Marriage (1991) - John Melvil [Bristol Old Vic]
- Reflected Glory (1992) - James [Vaudeville Theatre]
- The Mountain Giants (1993) - The Count [National Theatre]
- A Voyage Round My Father (1995) - Son [Theatre Royal Bath]
- Sweet Panic (1996) - Martin [Hampstead Theatre]
- Luther (2001) - Pope Leo X [National Theatre]
- Richard II (2005) - Scroop [Old Vic Theatre]
- The Years Between -(2007) Michael [Orange Tree Theatre]
- The Voysey Inheritance - (2005) Trenchard Voysey [National Theatre]
- Mrs. Warren's Profession (2009) - Praed [Comedy Theatre]
- Racing Demon (2011) - Bishop of Kingston [Crucible Theatre Sheffield]
- Lot And His God (2012) - Lot [The Print Room]
- Eldorado (2014) - Aschenbrenner [The Arcola]
- The Philanderer (2016) - Cuthbertson [Orange Tree Theatre]
