= Ballymagan railway station =

Former railway station in Ireland

Coordinates: 55.1538°N 7.4279°W

Ballymagan

General information
- Location: Ballymagan; County Donegal
- Owner: Londonderry and Lough Swilly Railway
- Line: Londonderry and Lough Swilly Railway

History
- Opened: 1 July 1901
- Closed: 2 December 1935

Services
Preceding station	Londonderry and Lough Swilly Railway	Following station
Buncrana	Londonderry- Carndonagh	Kinnego Halt
Location
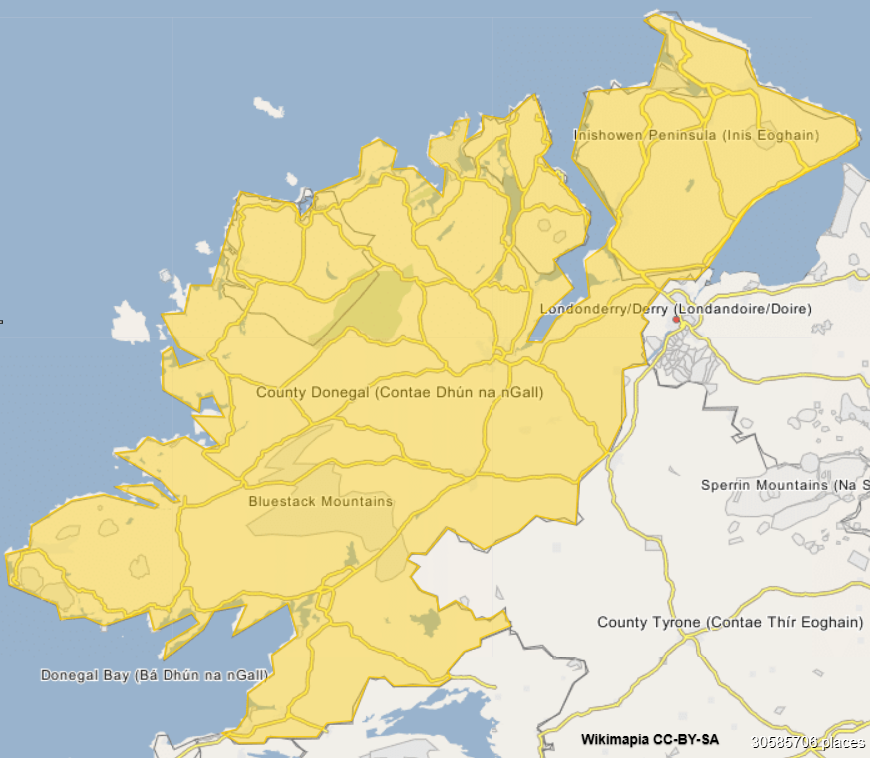
- Location within County Donegal Location within Ireland

Ballymagan railway station served Ballymagan in County Donegal, Ireland.

The station opened on 1 July 1901 on the Londonderry and Lough Swilly Railway line from Londonderry Graving Dock to Carndonagh.

It closed for passengers on 2 December 1935.
