= The Railway Station Man =

1992 film by Michael Whyte

- Directed by: Michael Whyte
- Written by: Shelagh Delaney
- Produced by: Andree Molyneaux
- Starring: Julie Christie; Donald Sutherland; John Lynch; Mark Tandy
- Cinematography: Bruno de Keyzer
- Music by: Richard Hartley
- Release date: 1992
- Running time: 93 minutes
- Language: English

The Railway Station Man is a 1992 made-for-cable film directed by Michael Whyte, and starring Julie Christie, Donald Sutherland and John Lynch. It was based on the 1984 novel of the same name by Irish writer Jennifer Johnston. It was filmed on location in Glencolmcille, County Donegal, Ireland.

== Plot ==
Northern Irishwoman Helen Cuffe (Julie Christie) has her life upturned when her husband is mistakenly killed by the Irish Republican Army. Ten years later, it is shown that she and her young son, Jack (Frank MacCusker), moved to a small town in Donegal to start life anew. Jack resented his mother's lack of love for his father and the pair became alienated as he moved to university in Dublin. Helen is now an amateur painter.

Helen meets a mysterious American named Roger Hawthorne (Donald Sutherland), who is in the area to refurbish an old railway station. He has a false arm from a shrapnel injury and he gradually explains a difficult family relationship behind his frequent relocations. Helen also meets Damian Sweeney (John Lynch), a young man helping Roger with the building work. Seeing Damian enjoying a naked swim inspires Helen’s painting to a new level.

A romance slowly blossoms between Roger and Helen, and both find love and passion unexpectedly. However, Jack has become involved with Manus Dempsey (Mark Tandy), organiser of a violent political group, who sees an opportunity to use the old engine shed at the disused station to store explosives. In the climax, lives are lost. Helen is left alone, to paint.

== Cast ==
- Julie Christie – Helen Cuffe
- Donald Sutherland – Roger Hawthorne
- John Lynch – Damian Sweeney
- Mark Tandy – Manus Dempsey
- Frank McCusker – Jack Cuffe
- Ingrid Craigie – Mary Heron
- Johnny O'Doherty Craig – Young Jack Cuffe

== Production ==
It was filmed on location in Glencolumbkille, County Donegal, Ireland in the spring of 1991. The house was the former Cashelnagore railway station; the line closed in 1947.

Julie Christie and Donald Sutherland previously worked together on Don't Look Now and there had been various attempts to get them together on a project again but their schedules did not line up. Sutherland was critical of TNT for one of the love scenes from the film being cut, in contrast to violence shown on television.

== Reception ==
Ray Loynd of the Los Angeles Times praised the "depiction of the beautiful, foggy, damp Irish west coast" but was otherwise critical of the film. The film has a score of 6.1 out of 10 on IMDb.
