= Bray Head =

Headland in County Wicklow, Ireland

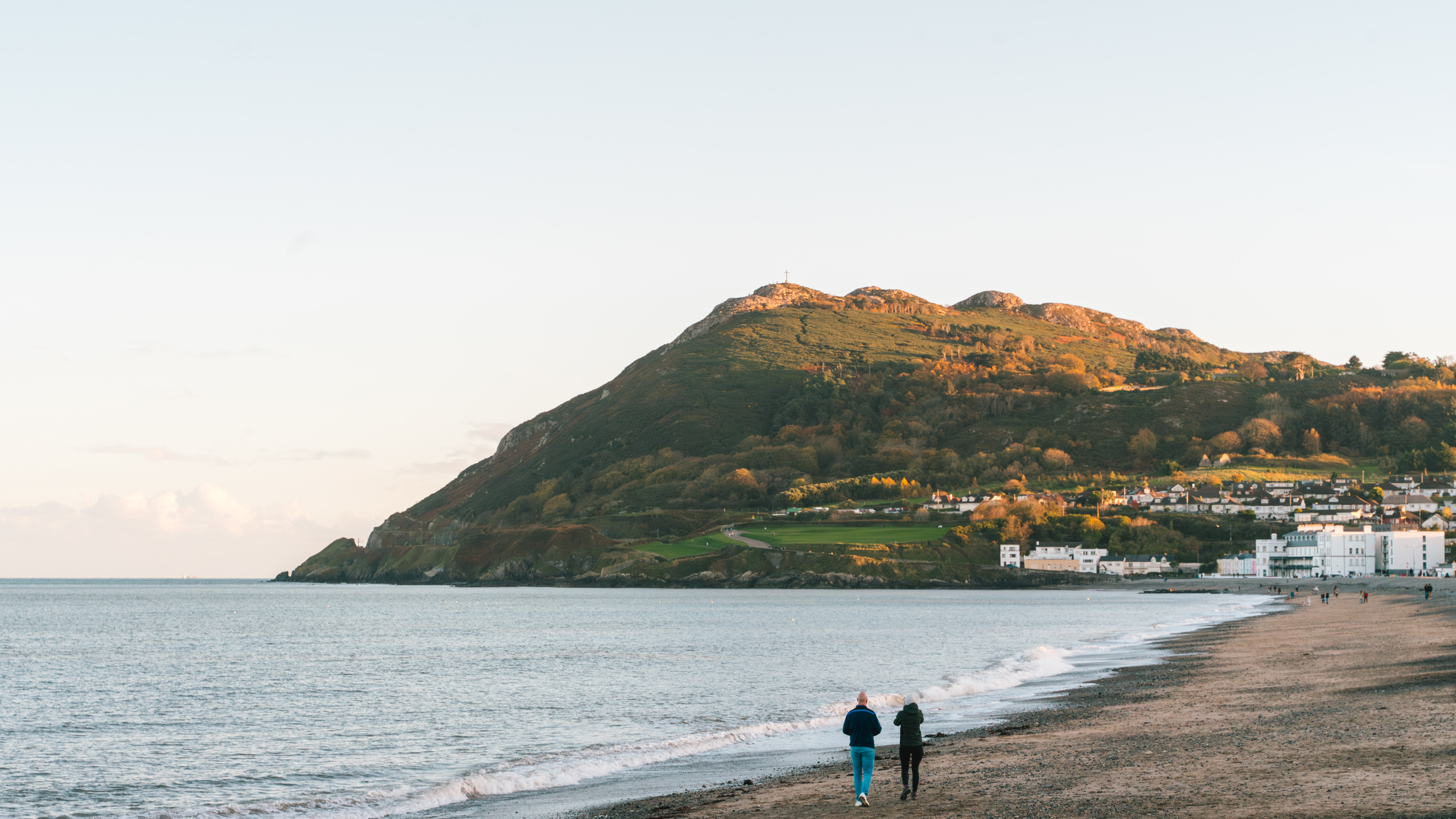
- A view of Bray Head, County Wicklow, Ireland, seen from Bray's beach during autumn.

Highest point
- Elevation: 243 m (797 ft)
- Coordinates: 53°11′25.90″N 6°05′03.00″W

Naming
- Native name: Ceann Bhré

Geography
- Location within Ireland
- Location: County Wicklow, Ireland
- Parent range: Wicklow Mountains

Bray Head (Irish: Ceann Bhré) is a 241 m (791 ft) hill and headland located in northern County Wicklow, Ireland, between the towns of Bray and Greystones. It forms part of the Wicklow Mountains and is a popular spot with hillwalkers. At the top of the head is a concrete cross which was placed there in 1950 during the holy year. Every Good Friday, hundreds of local people climb to the top of the head in a Good Friday procession marking the stations of the Cross as they go along, with the final station being held at the holy year cross. The headland and adjacent lands were designated under a Special Amenity Area Order in March 2008.

The most direct way to reach the cross at the top (about 190m above sea level) is via an ascending footpath that begins just outside the free car park on the lower, northern slopes, to the south of Bray Esplanade. This is a half-hour walk for a fit person. The footpath, after the initial section with cut steps, is a rough path formed by rainwater and ascending through natural woodland. A more gradual route can be taken from the Southern Cross, by Bray Golf Club, which is easier underfoot. There is also a route which ascends from the Greystones side of the cliff walk; this route leads quite directly up the east side of the hill and as a result is quite steep, Upon reaching the top you can then walk the path along to the cross.

The Dublin-Wicklow railway line runs outside of Bray Head along the coast, sometimes travelling within feet of the cliffs. This line, designed by Isambard Kingdom Brunel, is referred to as Brunel's Folly, due to the ongoing maintenance costs associated with maintaining a cliff-face line. The line had to be diverted on three occasions in 1876, 1879, and 1917. A serious accident occurred on 9 August 1867 when a passenger train derailed on nearby Brandy Hole Viaduct, causing the deaths of two passengers. The rail trip between Dublin and Bray Daly railway station, the nearest station to Bray Head, takes approximately 45 minutes.

On the morning of 14 April 2012, a waterspout was observed just off the coast of Bray Head.

The slate sea-cliffs at Bray Head have been established as a minor rock-climbing location since the 1970s, though a few of the climbs were originally recorded in the 1940s. The 2009 guidebook lists 27 single-pitch climbs, generally in the lower grades, up to HVS.

== Gallery ==
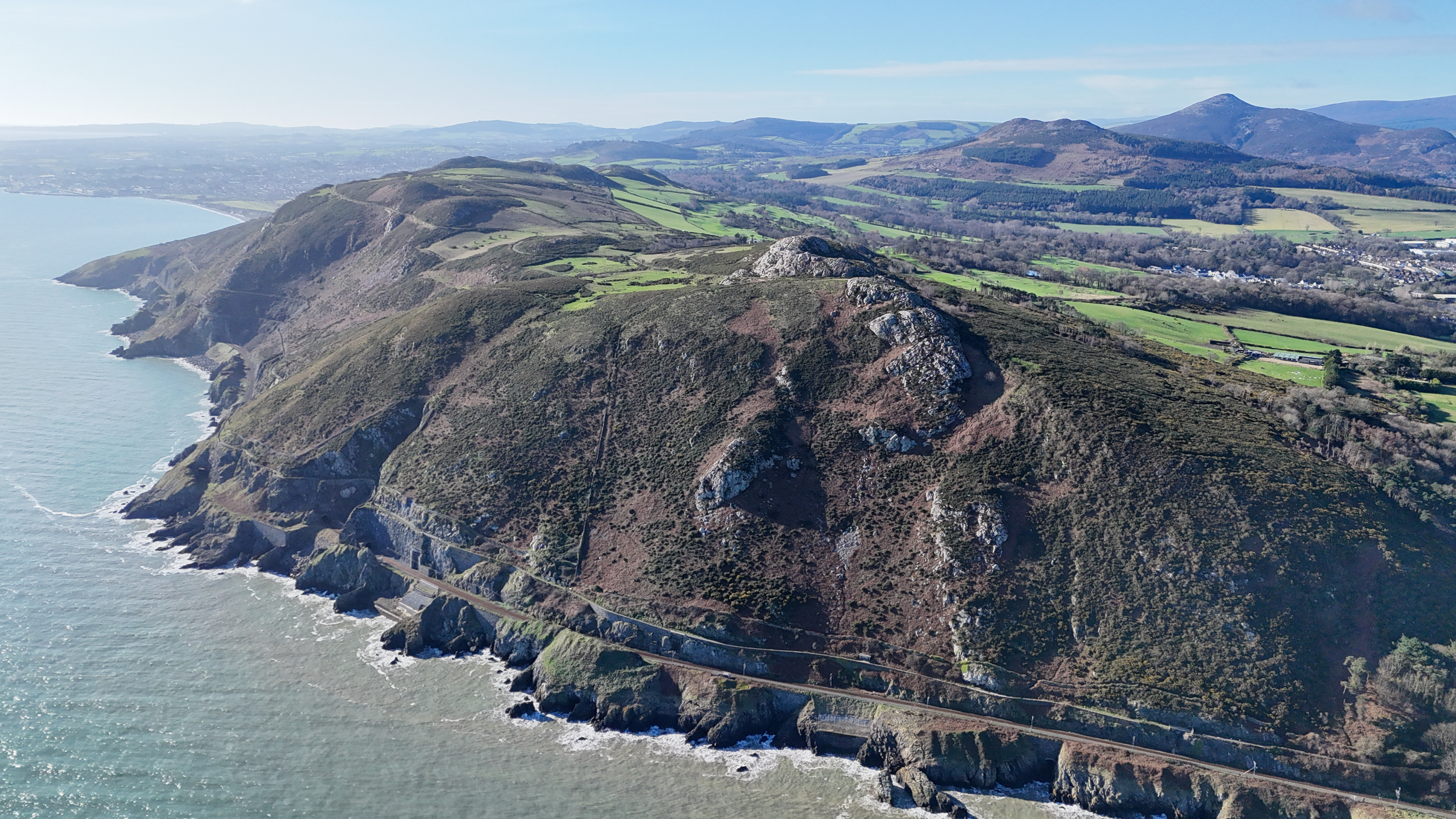
Bray Head aerial photo

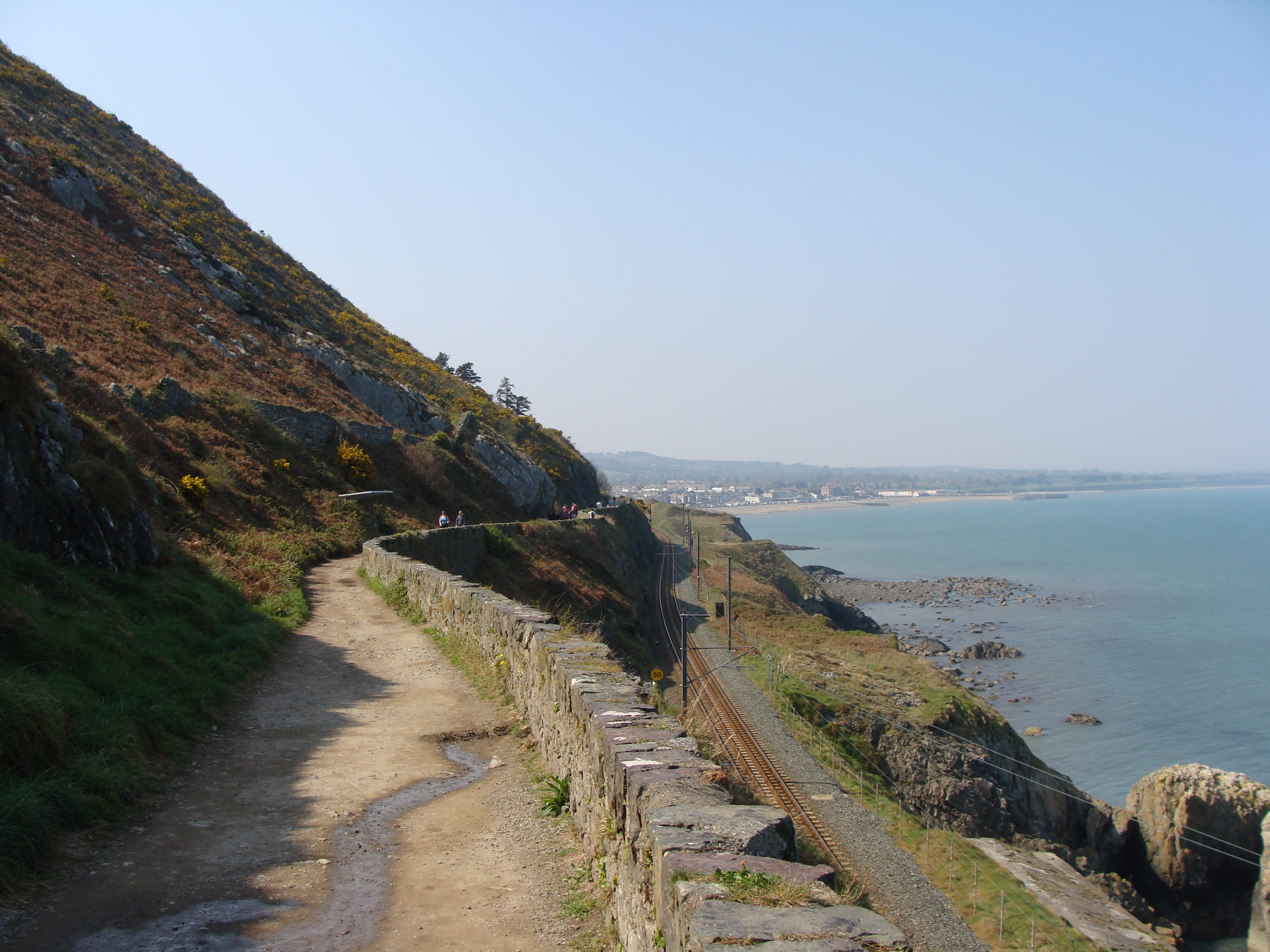
The Bray to Greystones Cliff Walk

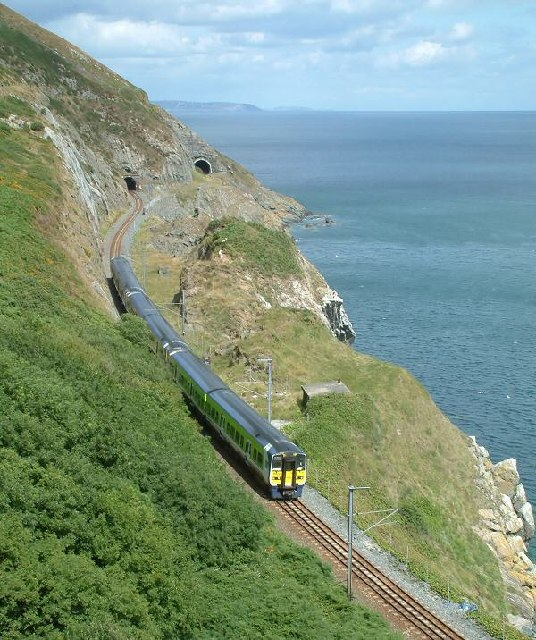
The railway along the cliffs of Bray Head with traces of the old alignment

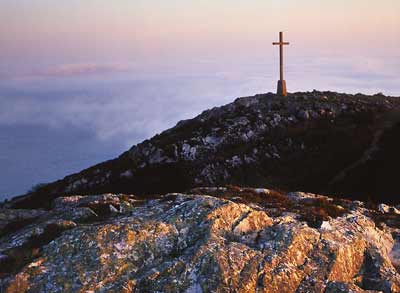
The Holy Year Cross on summit of Bray Head

Bray Head railway accident, 1867

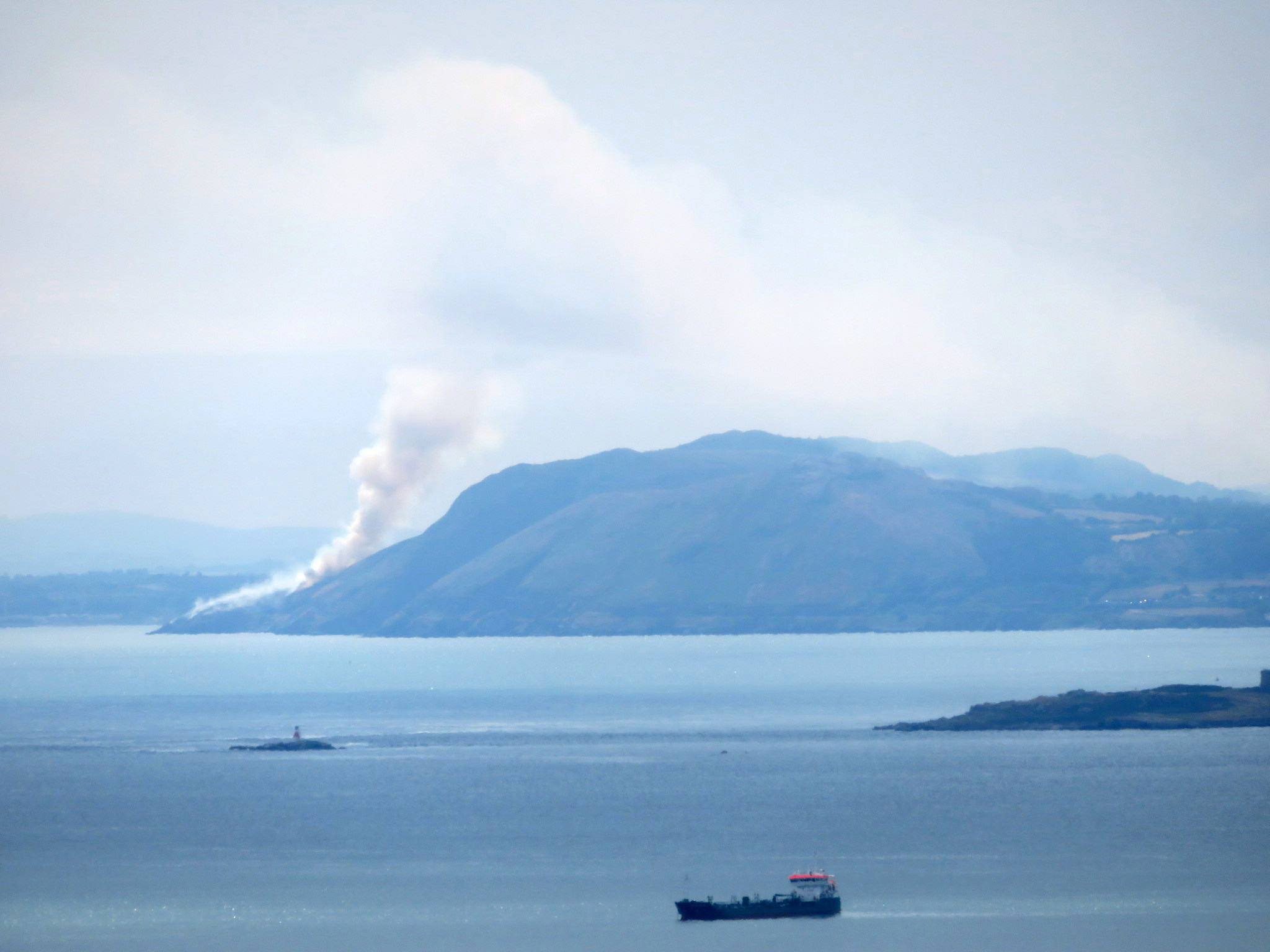
Bray Head in flames, 2018

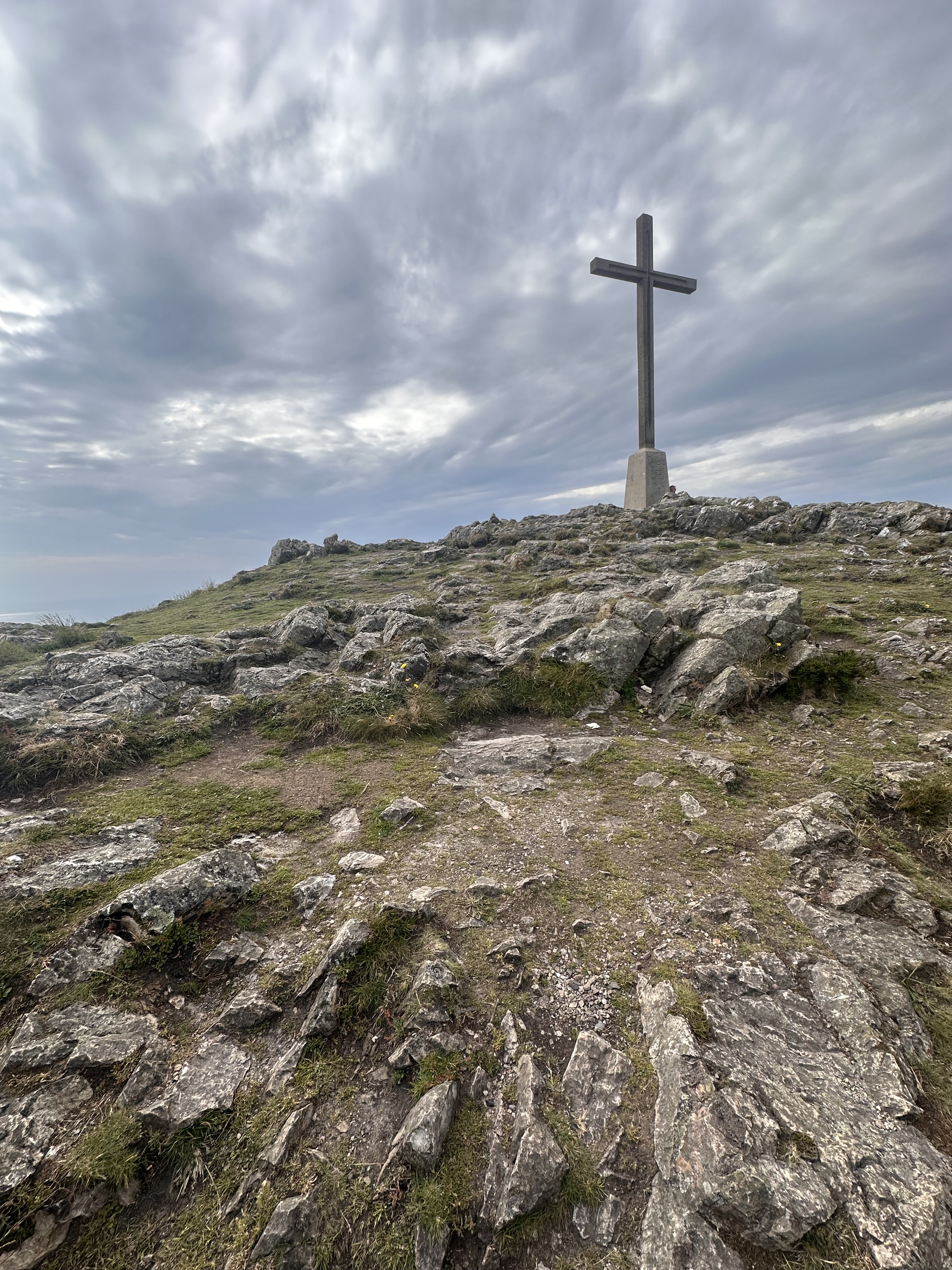
Bray head cross on Bray Head Hill walk, 2025.

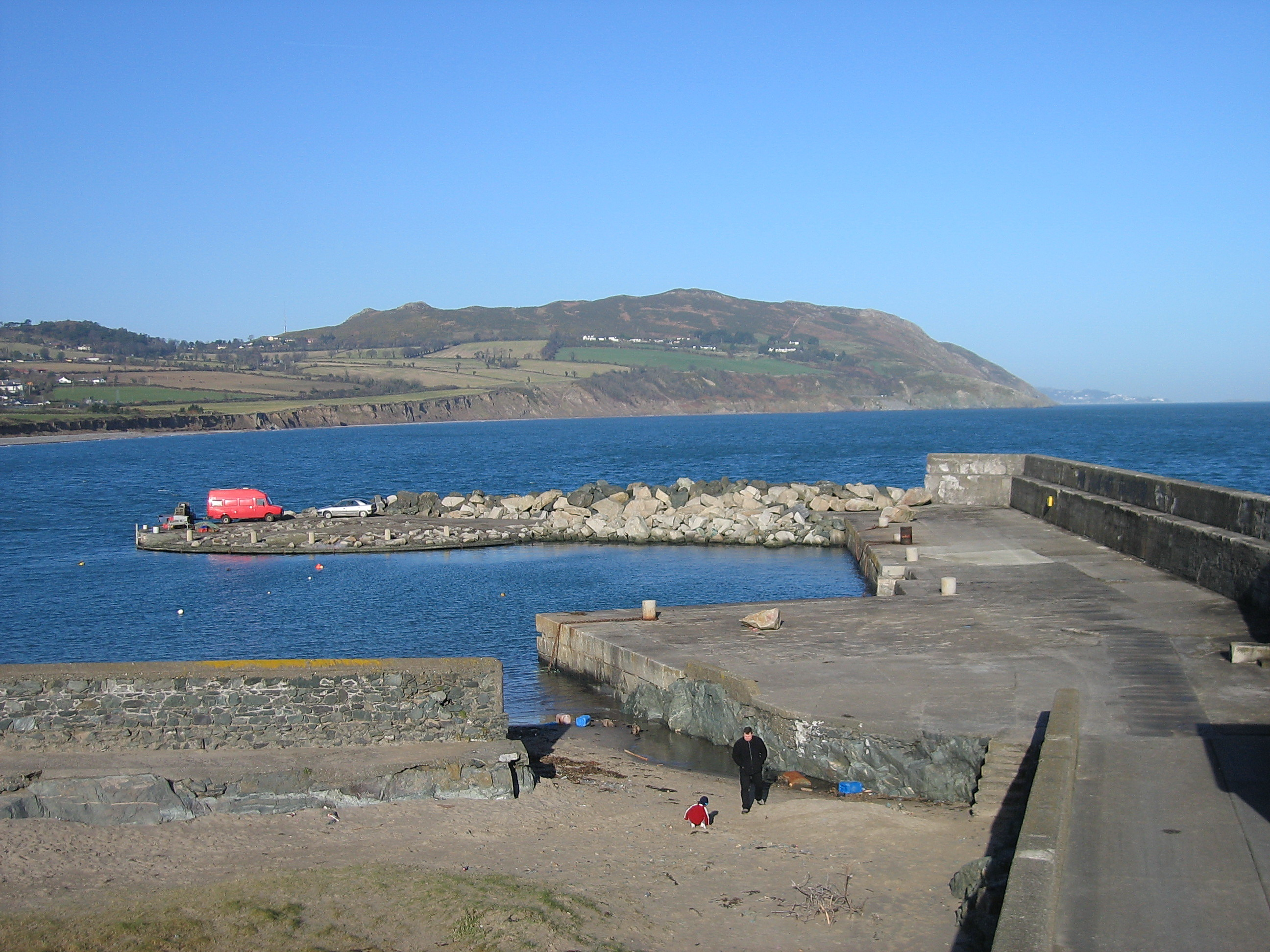
South side of Bray Head, viewed from the old Greystones harbour

== See also ==
- Geography of Ireland
