= Pluck railway station =

Railway station in Ireland

Pluck

General information
- Location: County Donegal; Ireland

History
- Original company: Londonderry and Lough Swilly Railway
- Post-grouping: Londonderry and Lough Swilly Railway

Key dates
- 1 December 1883: Station opens
- 3 June 1940: Station closes
Location

Pluck railway station served Pluck in County Donegal, Ireland.

The station opened on 1 December 1883 when the Londonderry and Lough Swilly Railway built their line from Londonderry Graving Dock to Letterkenny (LLS).

It closed for passengers on 3 June 1940.

It remained open for freight until 10 August 1953.

== Routes ==
| Preceding station | Disused railways | Following station |
|---|---|---|
| Manorcunningham | Londonderry and Lough Swilly Railway; Londonderry-Letterkenny | Letterkenny (LLS) |
