= Gallagh Road railway station =

Railway station in Derry, Northern Ireland

Gallagh Road

General information
- Location: Upper Gallagh Rd. Derry, County Londonderry, Northern Ireland; UK
- Coordinates: 55.02874°N 7.34588°W
- Elevation: 27 ft (8.2 m)

History
- Original company: Londonderry and Lough Swilly Railway
- Post-grouping: Londonderry and Lough Swilly Railway

Key dates
- 1 March 1881: Station opens
- 1 February 1924: Station closes
Location

Gallagh Road railway station served Derry in County Londonderry in Northern Ireland.

The Londonderry and Lough Swilly Railway opened the station on 1 March 1881.

It closed on 1 February 1924.

== Routes ==
Preceding station	Disused railways	Following station
Londonderry Graving Dock	Londonderry and Lough Swilly Railway; Derry to Farland Point	Bridge End
