= Newtown Cunningham =

Village in County Donegal, Ireland

Newtowncunningham An Baile Nua
- Village
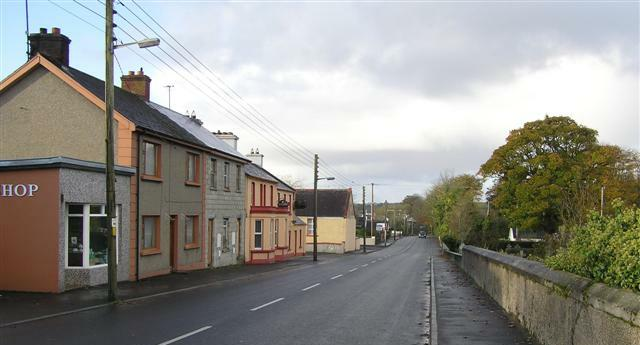
- Main Street

- Location in Ireland
- Coordinates: 54°59′53″N 7°30′50″W
- Country: Ireland
- Province: Ulster
- County: County Donegal
- Barony: Raphoe North

Government
  - Dáil constituency: Donegal
- Elevation: 10 m (33 ft)

Population (2022)
  - Total: 1,192
- Time zone: UTC+0 (WET)
  - Summer (DST): UTC+1 (IST (WEST))
- Irish grid reference: C312167

Newtown Cunningham, usually spelt Newtowncunningham or abbreviated to Newton (Irish: An Baile Nua, meaning 'new town'), is a village and townland in the Laggan district in the east of County Donegal, Ireland. It is located on the N13 road 18 kilometres (11 mi) east of Letterkenny and 16 km (10 mi) west of Derry. At the 2022 census, the village population was 1,192.

== History and name ==
Evidence of ancient settlement in the area, from the Iron Age onwards, includes the ringfort at Grianan of Aileach. Also nearby is the sixteenth-century Burt Castle.

The area of Newtown Cunningham was historically known as Culmacatrain. Like nearby Manorcunningham, the village takes its current name from John Cunningham, originally from Kilbirnie, Ayrshire, in Scotland, who was among the settlers granted lands in County Donegal during the 17th century Plantation of Ulster.

The village's architecture includes stately Anglo-Irish "big houses", now known as the Manse and the Castle, which reflect the village's colonial and Presbyterian history.

== Economy and community ==
Newtowncunningham's long Main Street once formed part of the busy N13 trunk road connecting Letterkenny with Derry. A bypass diverted the N13 around the village in 1985.

After the bypass opened, a number of the village's businesses either closed or moved to locations along the bypass, gradually divesting the village of economic activity. Newtowncunningham has several grocery stores and a filling station. The village also has an An Post post office outlet. Other businesses include several takeaways, a credit union and a pharmacy.

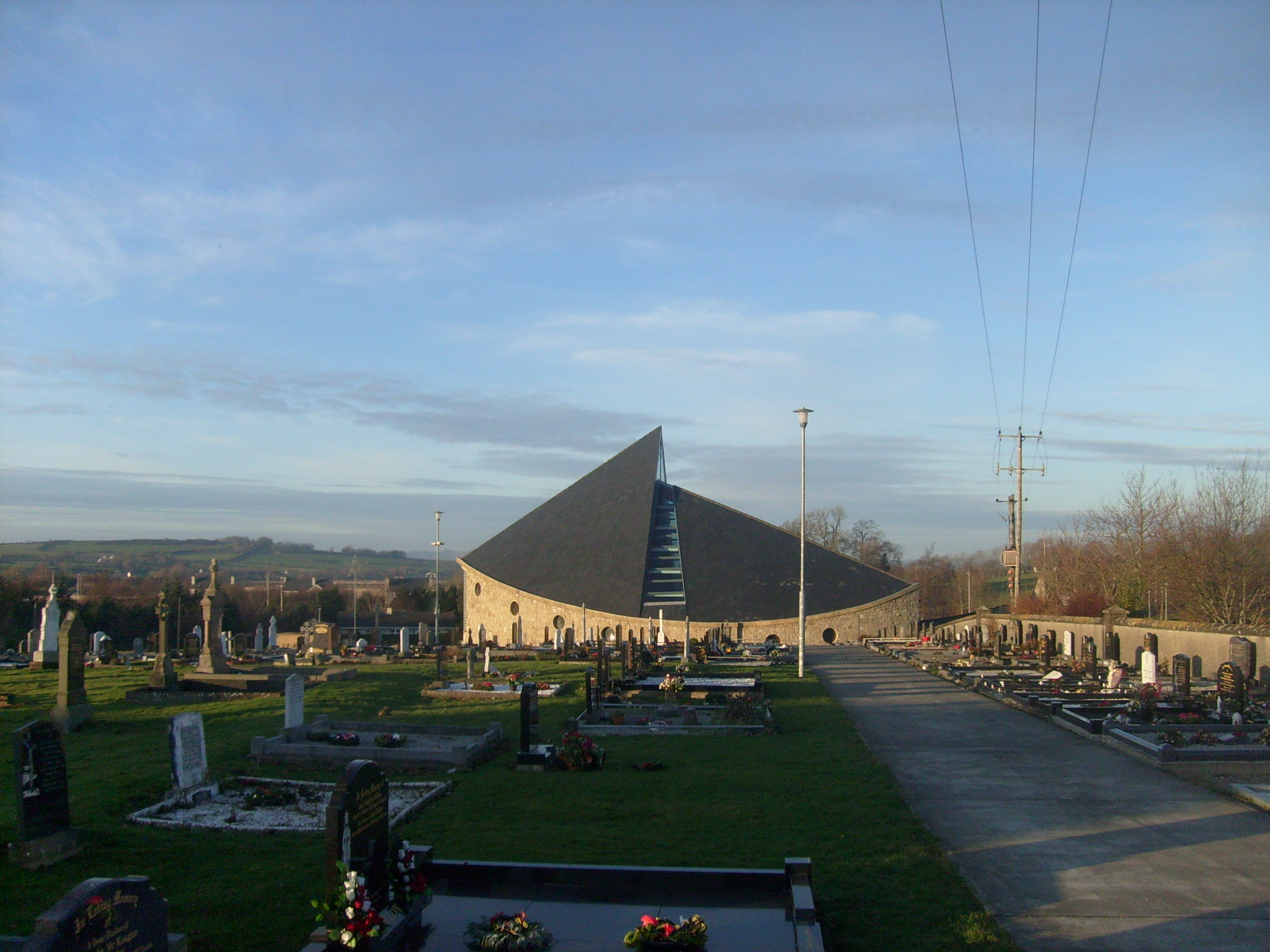
All Saints, the Catholic church in Newtowncunningham

As of the early 21st century, residential developments were built at both ends of Newtown Cunningham, and the village's population increased from 663 to 1,192 between the 2002 and 2022 census. A number of retail and service outlets were also built, and an industrial estate area located at the Letterkenny end of the village contains a number of retail outlets.

Newtown Cunningham is located close to Blanket Nook, a wetland area and bird sanctuary that is a wintering site for the rare whooper swan.

== Transport ==
Newtown Cunningham is served by Bus Éireann route numbers 64 and 480. These include Bus Éireann's Derry to Letterkenny and Derry to Galway routes. As of 2018, Bus Éireann provided 11 daily buses passing through the village in both directions, either to Derry or to Letterkenny. The bus stop in the village is located adjacent to the Roman Catholic parish graveyard on the Main Street. The village was also previously served by Lough Swilly Buses, but this provider ceased trading in April 2014.

Newtown Cunningham is not directly served by rail, and Newtowncunningham railway station (which opened in June 1883) was closed for passenger traffic on 3 June 1940 and closed altogether on 10 August 1953. It was a single-platform station on the Londonderry and Lough Swilly Railway line. The former station building, completed c. 1883, is now a private house.

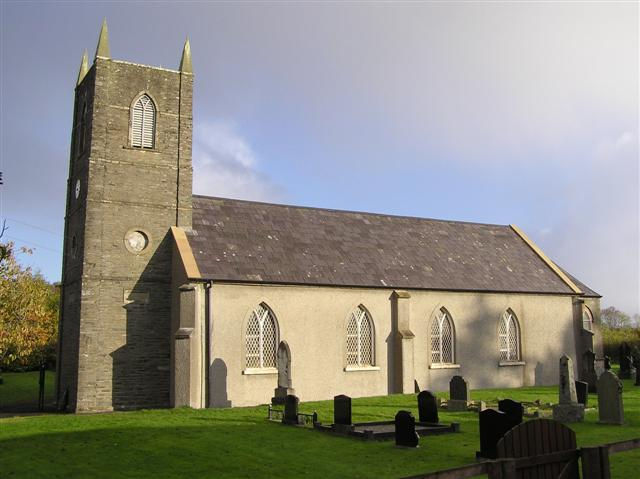
Newtowncunningham Church of Ireland church

== Culture ==
The population is largely Roman Catholic, with significant Presbyterian and Church of Ireland presences, and churches for each.

Scoil Cholmcille, a Catholic primary (national) school, was completed in 1983. In 1986, the Páirc Colmcille sports ground was opened. In the late 1990s, the existing Catholic church in the centre of the village was demolished, and construction began on a replacement church. This church, the Church of All Saints, opened in 1999.

The Columban Hall on the main street hosts several events throughout the year, such as festivals, concerts, and car boot sales.

The local Orange Lodge, Newtown Cunningham LOL1063, meet in the Orange Hall on Main Street and celebrated their centenary in 2011. An Apprentice Boys club and an accordion band also meet in the Orange Hall. The hall is used by community groups throughout the year as well as hosting an annual Remembrance Day service and concerts. A September 2014 arson attack destroyed the Orange Hall. July 2017 saw work to rebuild the hall begin, with the hope that it would be open in 2019.

Newtown Cunningham's Presbyterian Church was formed in 1830. The church building was built in one year by voluntary labour. Newtown Cunningham Presbyterian Church was united with Crossroads from 1957 until 1974 and is now united with Ray.

== People ==
- Sir George Bowen (1821–1899), author and colonial administrator, was born just outside Newtowncunningham.
- Daniel Collins (born 1985), Irish rower and national indoor rowing champion.
- Erin Friel (born 2008), Irish sprinter.
- Seán Rooney (1998/1999–2022), soldier killed while serving on the UNIFIL peacekeeping mission in Lebanon in 2022

== See also ==
- List of towns and villages in Ireland
