= Tooban =

Townland in County Donegal, Ireland

Coordinates: 55°4′0″N 7°25′50″W

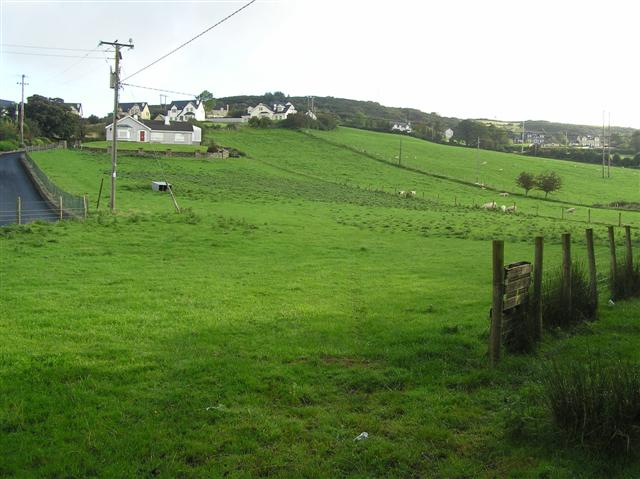
Looking towards Tooban Upper

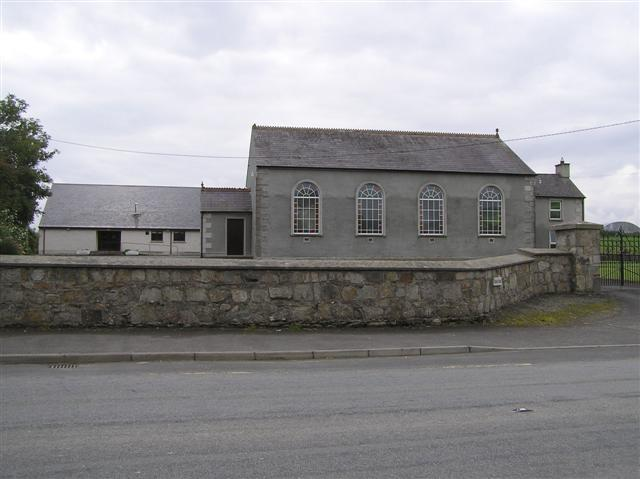
Faghan Presbyterian Church in Tooban

Tooban (Irish: Taobh Bán), also known as Tievebane, is a townland in County Donegal in the north west of Ireland. It is traversed by the R238 road. Faghan Presbyterian church is situated near the centre of the townland.

It was served by Tooban Junction railway station from 1864 to 1953.

Tooban (listed in census reports as Tievebane) had a population of 345 people as of the 2016 census.
