= Manorcunningham =

Village in County Donegal, Ireland

Manorcunningham Mainéar Uí Chuinneagáin
- Village
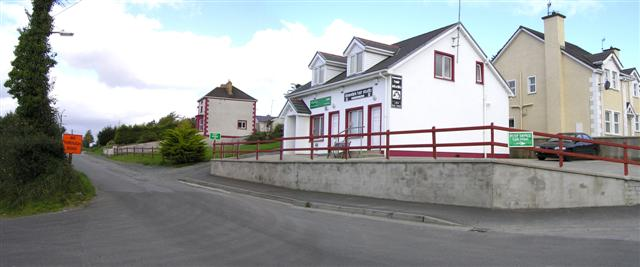
- Manorcunningham post office

- Location in Ireland
- Coordinates: 54°57′12″N 7°37′16″W
- Country: Ireland
- Province: Ulster
- County: County Donegal

Government
  - Dáil constituency: Donegal

Population (2022)
  - Total: 830
- Time zone: UTC+0 (WET)
  - Summer (DST): UTC-1 (IST (WEST))

Manorcunningham, or Manor (Irish: Mainéar Uí Chuinneagáin, meaning "the manor of Fort Cownyngham") is a village and townland in County Donegal, Ireland. It is located 7 km (4 mi) from Letterkenny on the main road to Derry. It is known locally and throughout Donegal as just Manor.

== History ==
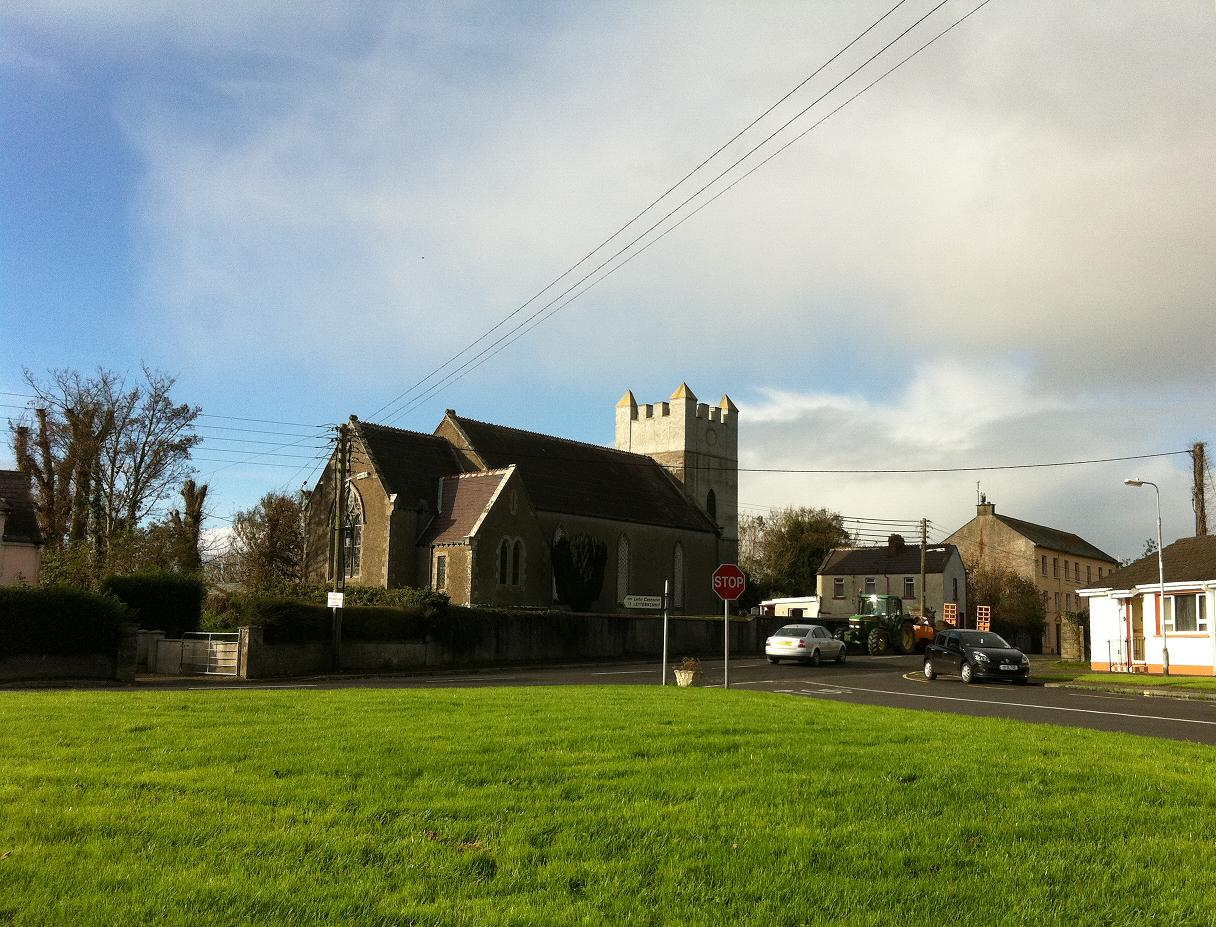
Raymochey Church of Ireland church

Before the Plantation of Ulster, Mannorcunningham was part of the townland of Magheramore (historically spelt as Machrimore and Maghrimore; from Irish Machaire Mór).

== Amenities ==
The Local Community Resource Centre hosts a number of local community groups under an umbrella organisation called Manorcunningham Community Development Ltd., often referred to as MCDA, who run the centre. The facility has a computer suite, with broadband access, and hosts several fitness, sports, dancing, youth and community groups. MCDA have also developed plans for the wider village, inclusive of health matters, outreach services and infrastructure.

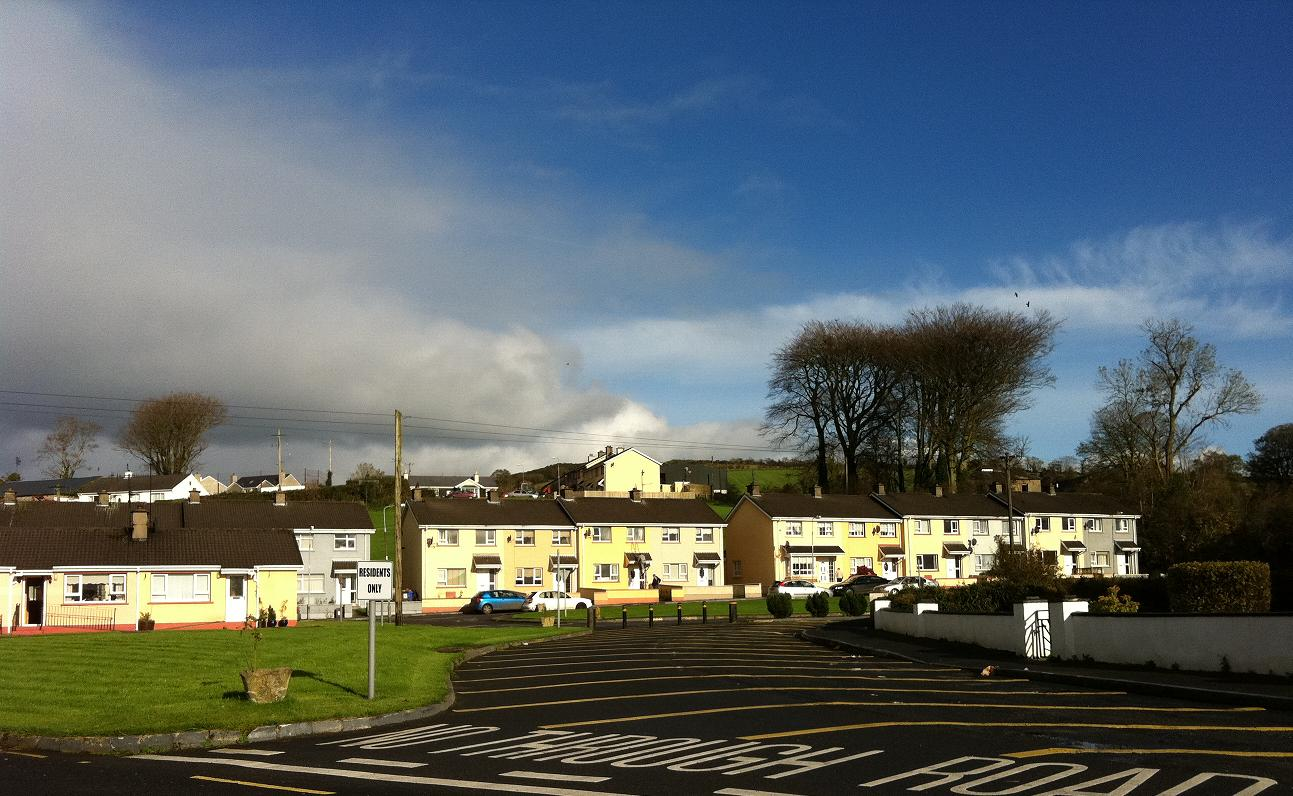
Housing in Manorcunningham

There are two local shops, takeaway, post office and a hairdressers in the village. Religious services are held in both the Church of Ireland and Presbyterian churches, with Roman Catholic services held in the local Catholic church on the outskirts of the village.

== Transport ==
Manorcunningham railway station opened on 30 June 1883, closed for passenger traffic on 3 June 1940, and finally closed altogether on 10 August 1953.

Until 2014, a regular Lough Swilly bus service ran through the village towards either Letterkenny or Derry. After the Lough Swilly bus company ceased trading, Bus Éireann took over the route. However, the Bus Éireann service only stops on the main N13 road adjacent to the village. A covered bus shelter was built at the main road junction with the village. Gallaghers Coach Company, a private transport company, also runs a service between Annagry and Belfast via Derry, and which stops in Manorcunningham upon request.

== People ==
- Major-General Sir James Murray Irwin, doctor in the British Army.
- Erminda Rentoul Esler, novelist.
- Sarah Crockett (née Stewart), paternal great-great-grandmother of Davy Crockett (1786–1836).

== See also ==
- List of populated places in the Republic of Ireland
