= Tooban Junction railway station =

Railway station in Ireland

Tooban Junction

General information
- Location: Tooban, County Donegal; Ireland

History
- Original company: Londonderry and Lough Swilly Railway
- Post-grouping: Londonderry and Lough Swilly Railway

Key dates
- 9 September 1864: Station opens
- 1 August 1866: Station closes for passengers
- 1 February 1884: Station reopens for passengers
- 6 September 1940: Station closes for passengers
- 10 August 1953: Station closes
Location

Tooban Junction railway station served Tooban in County Donegal, Ireland.

The station opened on 9 September 1864 when the Londonderry and Lough Swilly Railway built their line from Londonderry Middle Quay to Farland Point.

It closed for passengers on 23 October 1935. Freight services continued until 10 August 1953.

== Routes ==
Preceding station	Disused railways	Following station
Burnfoot	Londonderry and Lough Swilly Railway; Londonderry-Farland Point	Trady
Burnfoot	Londonderry and Lough Swilly Railway; Londonderry-Letterkenny	Carrowen
Burnfoot	Londonderry and Lough Swilly Railway; Londonderry-Carndonagh	Inch Road
