= Letterkenny railway station (L&LSR) =

Railway station in Ireland

Letterkenny (LLS)

General information
- Location: Letterkenny, County Donegal; Ireland
- Coordinates: 54.953545°N 7.728424°W
- Elevation: 32 ft (9.8 m)
- Platforms: 1
- Tracks: 1

History
- Original company: Londonderry and Lough Swilly Railway
- Post-grouping: Londonderry and Lough Swilly Railway

Key dates
- 30 June 1883: Station opens
- 3 June 1953: Station closes for passengers
- 1 July 1953: Station closes
Location

Letterkenny (LLS) railway station served the town of Letterkenny in County Donegal, Ireland.

The station opened on 30 June 1883 when the Londonderry and Lough Swilly Railway built their line from Londonderry Graving Dock to Letterkenny.

It was adjacent to the Letterkenny (CDR) railway station built by the County Donegal Railways Joint Committee and had a siding connection to the system of this company.

It closed on 3 June 1953 when the LLSR closed the line from Tooban Junction to Burtonport in an effort to save money.

Freight services continued until 1 July 1953.

== Routes ==
Preceding station	Disused railways	Following station
Pluck	Londonderry and Lough Swilly Railway	Oldtown
