= Londonderry and Lough Swilly Railway =

Irish Railway

- Londonderry and Lough Swilly Railway (LLSR); Letterkenny Railway (worked by LLSR)

Technical
- Track gauge: 3 ft (914 mm)
- Length: 99 miles (159 km) (1925)
- Track length: 107 miles 25 chains (172.7 km) (1925)

The Londonderry and Lough Swilly Railway Company (L&LSR, the Swilly) was an Irish public transport and freight company that operated in parts of County Londonderry and County Donegal between 1853 and 2014.

Established in the Victorian era and incorporated in June 1853, the L&LSR operated 99 miles of railways at its peak. With its rail services struggling to be profitable, it began a transition to bus and road freight services in 1929 and closed its last railway line in July 1953.

As it continued to operate bus services under the name Lough Swilly Bus Company into the 21st century, the L&LSR became the oldest railway company in the world to continue trading as a commercial concern. However, following a High Court petition by HM Revenue and Customs, the company went into liquidation, operating its final bus services on 19 April 2014.

== History ==
=== Background ===
As early as the 1700s there had been plans to link Lough Swilly and Lough Foyle by canal in order to avoid the rough sea passage around Malin Head, but these plans had repeatedly fallen through. In 1831, John Rennie the Younger, developed plans for a canal that required extensive work at the Lough Swilly end, primarily the building of embankments. Construction began on the canal but although the embankments were built the canal was never completed.

=== Construction and extension ===
Lough Swilly Railway Act 1853
- Act of Parliament
- Parliament of the United Kingdom
- Long title: An Act for making a Railway from Lough Swilly in the County of Donegal to the River Foyle near the City of Londonderry.
- Citation: 16 & 17 Vict. c. liv

Dates
- Royal assent: 28 June 1853

Text of statute as originally enacted

The Londonderry and Lough Swilly Railway was incorporated by the Lough Swilly Railway Act 1853 (16 & 17 Vict. c. liv).

The embankments built for the uncompleted Foyle-Swilly canal provided a route for a railway line to reach Lough Swilly, and the company opened its first line, a 5 ft 3 in (1,600 mm) link between Derry and Farland Point, on 31 December 1863, connecting with a ferry service from Farland Point to Rathmullan. A branch line between Tooban Junction and Buncrana was added in 1864 and much of the Farland Point line, which had not been a financial success, was closed in 1866.

In 1883, the canal embankments were again used to route a 3 ft (914 mm) narrow gauge railway, known as the Letterkenny Railway, between Cuttymanhill and Letterkenny, and the L&LSR connected with it by reopening the Tooban Junction—Cuttymanhill section of its Farland Point line. The L&LSR worked the Letterkenny Railway, and in 1885 it converted its other track from 5 ft 3 in (1,600 mm) gauge to 3 ft (914 mm) narrow gauge to enable through running. In 1887, ownership of the Letterkenny Railway passed to the Irish Board of Works, which continued the agreement by which the L&LSR operated the line.

Carndonagh was reached by an extension completed in 1901 and Burtonport by a one completed in 1903. Both lines were constructed as joint ventures with the UK Government, with ownership and liabilities shared between the two parties. During this period the company did not make a profit, and struggled to meet its debts.

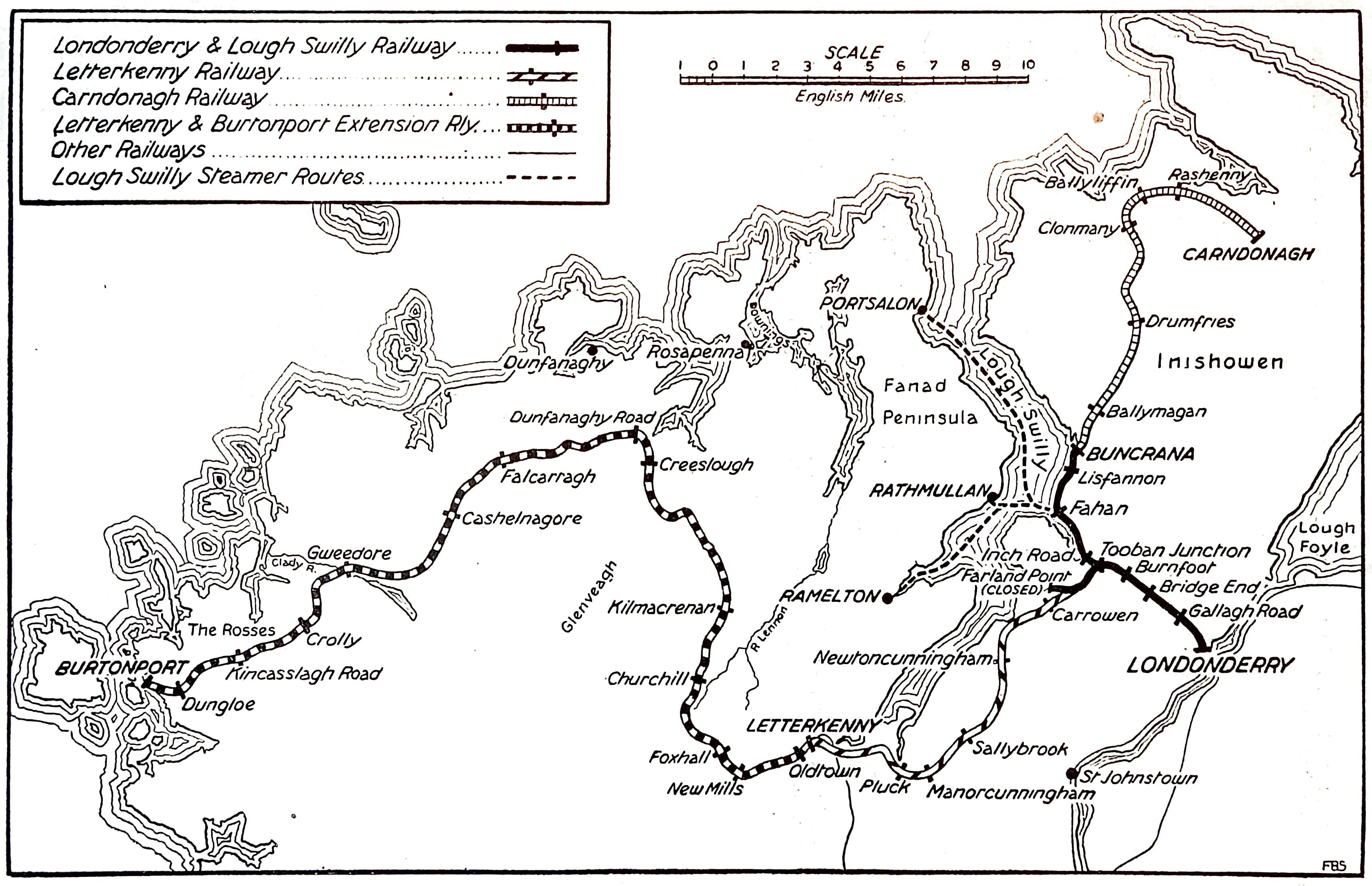
Map of the railway showing its constituents

=== Owencarrow Viaduct disaster ===
A serious accident occurred on the night of 30 January 1925 at around 8 pm at the Owencarrow Viaduct, County Donegal. Winds of up to 120 mph derailed carriages of the train off the viaduct, causing it to partially collapse. The roof of a carriage was ripped off, throwing four people to their deaths. The four killed were Philip Boyle and his wife Sarah from Arranmore Island, Una Mulligan from Falcarragh and Neil Duggan from Meenbunowen, Creeslough. Five people were seriously injured. The remains of the viaduct can today be seen from the N56 road between Kilmacrennan and Creeslough.

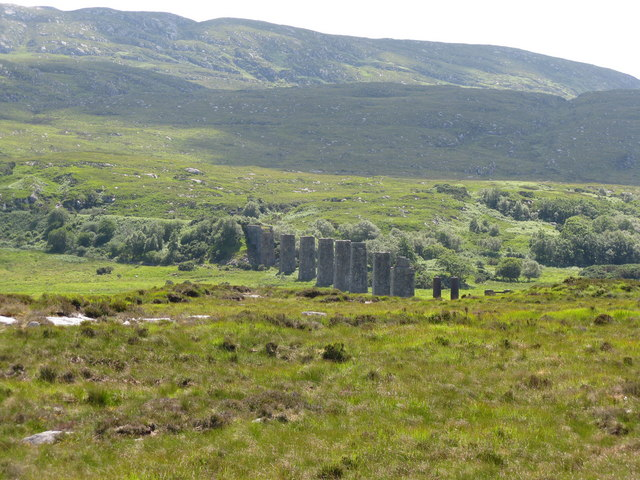
Owencarrow Viaduct

=== Transfer to road operations ===
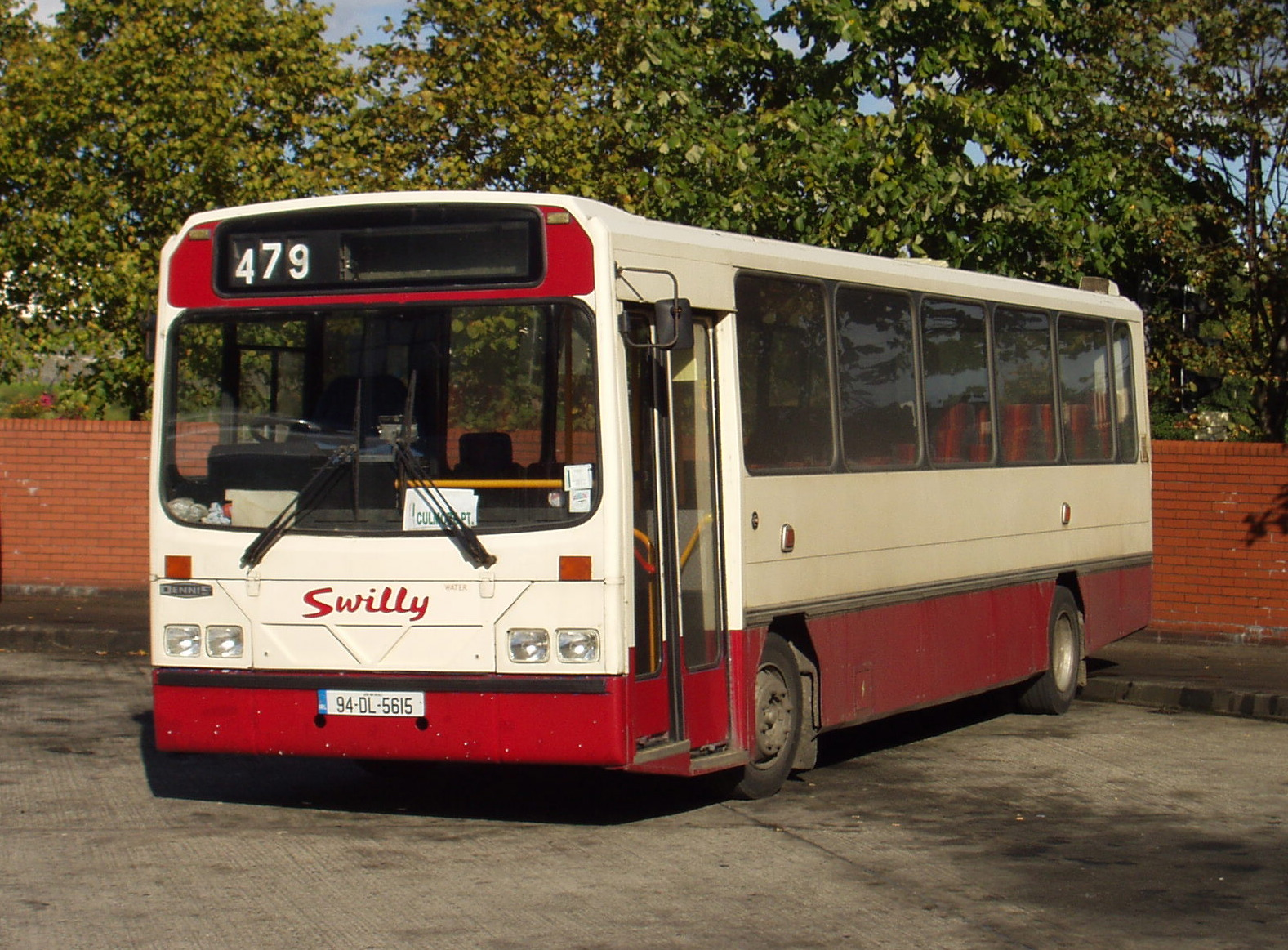
A L&LS Wright Handybus

From 1929, the company began to acquire bus assets throughout Donegal. Further expansion followed rapidly. It entered profitability in the early 1930s as a result of these ventures. Acquisition of freight operations followed, and this led to a reduction of rail services and eventual closure of lines. The Carndonagh branch was closed in about 1935 and the Burtonport line closing entirely in 1940, with a section temporarily re-opening in 1941 to Gweedore, closing finally in 1947. The Buncrana section of the line lost its passenger service in 1948, with its freight service, and the remaining Letterkenny services all closing on 8 August 1953.

=== End of rail operations ===
The last train to run on the line was the 2.15 pm from Letterkenny to Derry on 8 August 1953. It included 14 wagons of cattle and arrived 50 minutes late. Bob Turner was the driver with Paddy Clifford as fireman. The Derry Journal reported at the time "... the guard, Mr. Daniel McFeeley, or anyone else, did not call out 'Next Stop Derry'. Everyone knew that the next stop would be the last stop – the last ever."

=== Road-only operations ===
Following the cessation of all rail services, the company purchased second-hand buses from a number of operators, including Ulsterbus, and obtained vehicles on loan from CIÉ. The company operated passenger bus services, freight services, and holiday tour services, as well as providing school bus services for many schoolchildren in Donegal. However, it failed to be profitable throughout the 1970s, and was purchased from bankruptcy by Patrick Doherty, a Buncrana businessman, in 1981. The company maintained offices at the Foyle Street Bus Depot in Derry, and in Letterkenny Bus Depot in Donegal. It also had large garage areas in Derry and Letterkenny, where it kept its fleet of buses. The majority of its bus fleet, with the exception of those used for holiday touring, was more than 10 years old, mainly consisting of 1994 registered Dennis Darts.

=== Cessation of operations ===
An attempt to withdraw bus services from Donegal in June 2003 met with resistance, because the services were seen as crucial not only to schools but also to the elderly and rural population of Donegal.

The company finally went into liquidation and ceased operations after HM Revenue and Customs petitioned the High Court to wind up the company due to substantial debts owed to them and other creditors. The company subsequently went into liquidation and ceased trading on 18 April 2014 with the loss of 80 jobs, 60 in Donegal and a further 20 in Derry. The announcement caused shock and anger in local communities. Bus Éireann and Ulsterbus took over some of the routes, having ensured transportation after the 2014 Easter holidays for the 2,000 schoolchildren who previously depended upon Lough Swilly services. The last bus services operated on the evening of Saturday 19 April. Some of the routes have been maintained by other operators.

=== Possible Future Re-creation ===
The 2024 All Island Strategic Rail Review envisaged recreating the Derry to Letterkenny rail route within 25 years. A 2026 proposal from the campaign group 'Into the West' envisaged that the new line would follow some of the route used by the Londonderry and Lough Swilly Railway, with stations in Newtoncunningham and Manorcunningham.

== Routes ==
=== Rail routes ===
L&LSR rail routes started in Derry at Londonderry Graving Dock station where the depot was.

The railway headed northwest, passing through Gallagh Road, Harrity's Road, which was the near the border between Northern Ireland and the Republic of Ireland, Bridge End, Burnfoot and Tooban Junction. At Tooban Junction the railway branched, north into Inishowen and broadly west towards Letterkenny and the towns of northern Donegal.

The Inishowen branch ran through Inch Road, Fahan, Buncrana, Ballymagan, Kinnego, Drumfries, Meendoran, Clonmany, Ballyliffin, Rashenny, Carndoagh Halt, and terminating at Carndonagh.

The western branch ran through Carrowen (near Farland Point), Newtowncunningham, Sallybrook, Manorcunningham, Pluck, Letterkenny, Oldtown, New Mills, Fox Hall, Churchill, Kilmacrenan, Barnes Halt, Creeslough, Dunfanaghy Road, Falcarragh, Cashelnagore, Gweedore, Crolly, Kincasslagh Road, Dungloe and terminating in Burtonport.

=== Bus routes ===
Bus routes operated:

- Route 952 Letterkenny-Kerrykeel/Fanad
- Route 953 Letterkenny-Gweedore/Dungloe
- Route 954 Londonderry/Derry-Letterkenny
- Route 955 Londonderry/Derry-Carndonagh via Buncrana
- Londonderry/Derry-Culmore
- Route 956 Londonderry/Derry-Buncrana
- Route 957 Londonderry/Derry-Muff
- Route 957 Londonderry/Derry-Greencastle
- Route 959 Londonderry/Derry-Carndonagh

== Locomotives ==
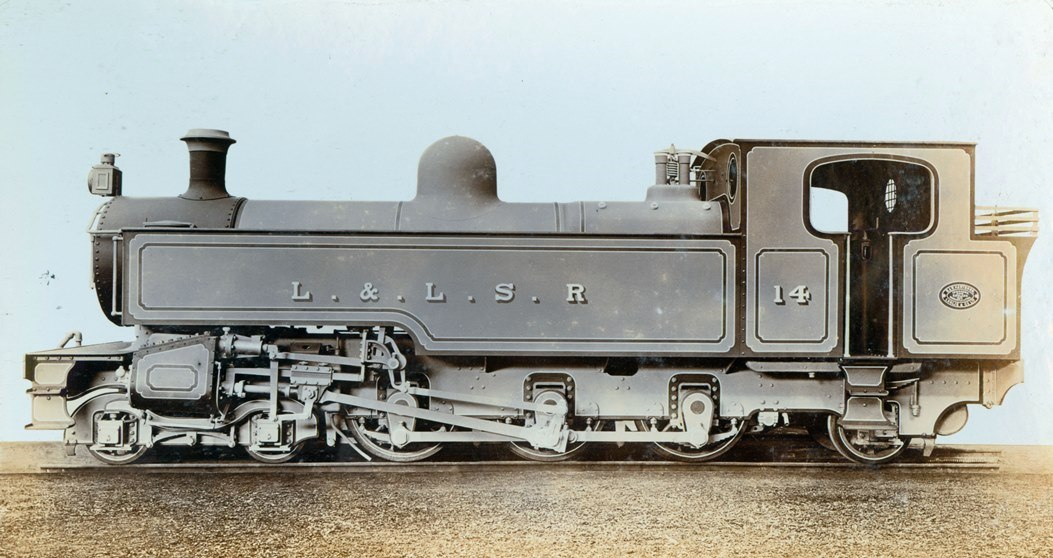
Locomotive for the Londonderry and Lough Swilly Railway, No. 14

Number	Name	Built	Manufacturer	Configuration	Notes
L&LSR No. 1	J T Macky	1882	Black, Hawthorn & Company	0-6-2T	Scrapped 1911
L&LSR No. 2	Londonderry	1883	Black, Hawthorn & Company	0-6-2T	Scrapped 1912
L&LSR No. 3	Donegal	1883	Black, Hawthorn & Company	0-6-2T	Scrapped 1913
L&LSR No. 4	Innishowen	1885	Black, Hawthorn & Company	0-6-0T	Scrapped 1940
L&LSR No. 5(A)		1873	Robert Stephenson & Company	2-4-0T	Former Glenariff Iron Ore and Harbour Company locomotive bought 1884; scrapped 1899
L&LSR No. 6(A)		1873	Robert Stephenson & Company	2-4-0T	Former Glenariff Iron Ore and Harbour Company locomotive bought 1884; scrapped 1904
L&LSR No. 5		1899	Hudswell Clarke	4-6-2T	Scrapped 1954
L&LSR No. 6		1899	Hudswell Clarke	4-6-2T	Scrapped 1954
L&LSR No. 7	Edward VII	1901	Hudswell Clarke	4-6-2T	Scrapped 1940
L&LSR No. 8		1901	Hudswell Clarke	4-6-2T	Scrapped 1954
L&BER No. 1		1902	Andrew Barclay Sons & Co	4-6-0T	Scrapped 1954
L&BER No. 2		1902	Andrew Barclay Sons & Co	4-6-0T	Scrapped 1940
L&BER No. 3		1902	Andrew Barclay Sons & Co	4-6-0T	Scrapped 1954
L&BER No. 4		1902	Andrew Barclay Sons & Co	4-6-0T	Scrapped 1953
L&LSR No. 9	Aberfoyle	1904	Kerr, Stuart & Company	4-6-2T	Scrapped 1928
L&LSR No. 10	Richmond	1904	Kerr, Stuart & Company	4-6-2T	Scrapped 1954
L&LSR No. 11		1905	Hudswell Clarke	4-8-0	Scrapped 1933
L&LSR No. 12		1905	Hudswell Clarke	4-8-0	Scrapped 1954
L&LSR No. 13		1910	Hawthorn Leslie & Company	4-6-2T	Scrapped 1940
L&LSR No. 14		1910	Hawthorn Leslie & Company	4-6-2T	Scrapped 1943
L&BER No. 5		1912	Hudswell Clarke	4-8-4T	Scrapped 1954
L&BER No. 6		1912	Hudswell Clarke	4-8-4T	Scrapped 1954

== See also ==
- Worsley Works produce model kits of Londonderry and Lough Swilly Railway railway vehicles
- Lists of rail accidents
- List of wind-related railway accidents
- List of narrow-gauge railways in Ireland
- List of Irish railway accidents
- Termon
- Creeslough

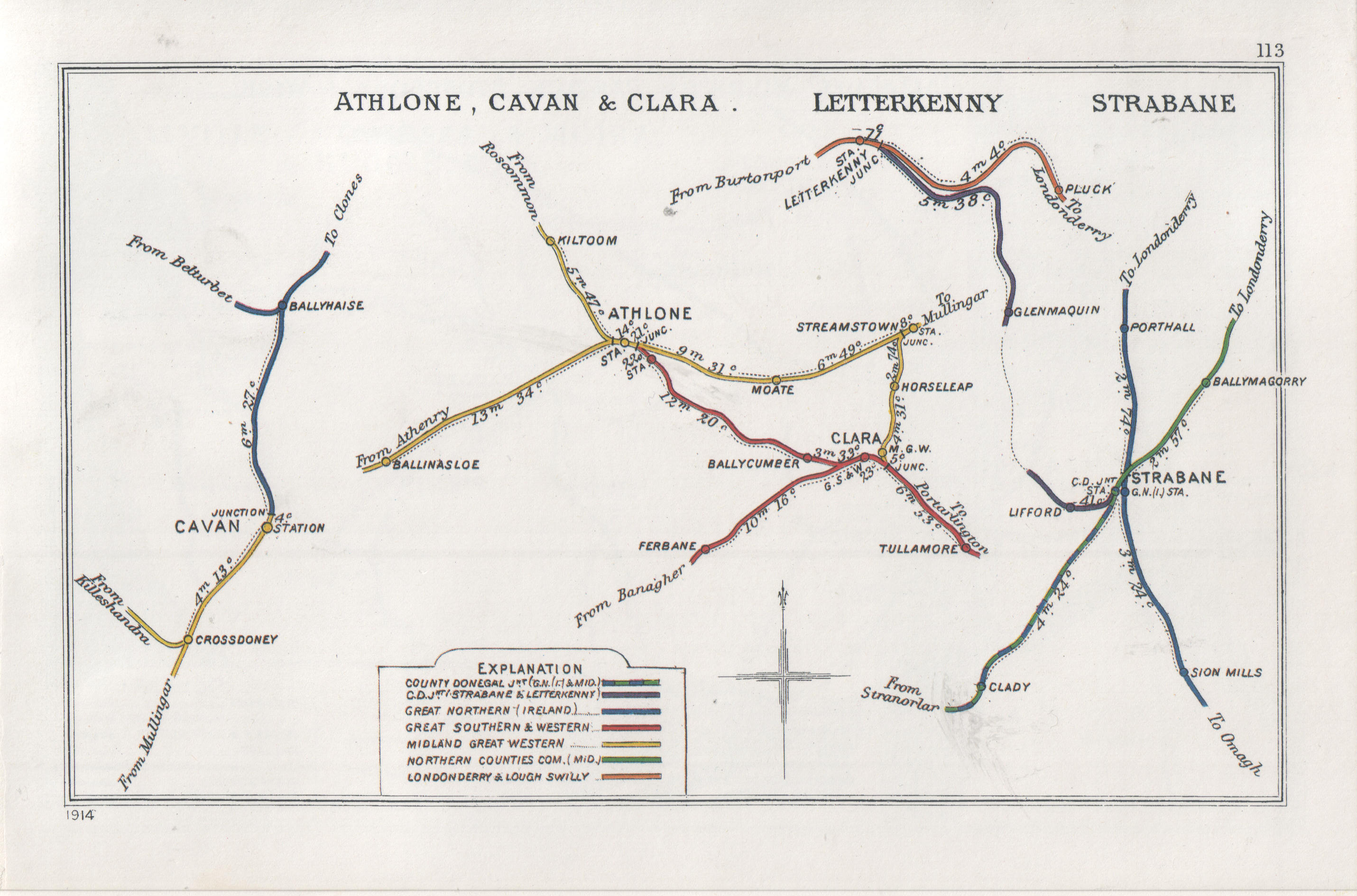
Railway Clearing House map with stations in Letterkenny.

=== Other narrow gauge railways in Ulster ===
- Ballycastle Railway
- Ballymena, Cushendall and Red Bay Railway
- Ballymena and Larne Railway
- Castlederg and Victoria Bridge Tramway
- Cavan and Leitrim Railway
- Clogher Valley Railway
- County Donegal Railways Joint Committee

== Bibliography ==
- Hajducki, S Maxwell (1974). A Railway Atlas of Ireland. Newton Abbot: David & Charles. pp. 3, 4, xiv. ISBN 0-7153-5167-2.
- Patterson, Edward M (1988) [1964]. The Londonderry and Lough Swilly Railway. Newton Abbott: David & Charles. pp. not cited. ISBN 0-7153-9167-4.
