= Henry Hart (soldier) =

Anglo-Irish soldier and landowner

Henry Hart (1566-1637) was an Anglo-Irish soldier and landowner of the Elizabethan and early Stuart eras. He served in the Nine Years' War (1584-1603) and was later involved in the opening incident of O'Doherty's Rebellion in 1608. As a servitor he acquired an estate in County Donegal.

== Tyrone's Rebellion ==
Hart served in Ireland under Sir Henry Docwra during the Nine Years' War rising to the rank of Captain. Docwra's forces operated out of Derry in alliance with local Gaelic forces opposed to the rebel Earl of Tyrone. Following the Treaty of Mellifont he was appointed to command Culmore Fort an important strategic post close to Derry.

== Later career ==
In 1608 Sir Cahir O'Doherty launched a rebellion from Burt Castle. O'Doherty had served on the Crown's side during the recent war, and was a natural loyalist, but had been angered at his treatment by Docwra's replacement as Governor of Derry, George Paulet. O'Doherty and Hart were friends, and the night before the rising he invited him and his wife to dinner. O'Doherty then took Hart prisoner and captured Culmore. He used the fort's arsenal to arm his followers. O'Doherty then followed up his seizure of Culmore with the Burning of Derry. O'Doherty was subsequently defeated and killed at the Battle of Kilmacrennan and the rebellion collapsed.

Despite his loss of Culmore, Hart was rewarded as a servitor like other veteran officers. In the Plantation of Ulster he was granted land close to Kilmacrennan in Donegal. This was in the heart of old O'Donnell territory, which had been confiscated following the Flight of the Earls. Several of Hart's former comrades also received land nearby which had been mapped out by the recent Bodley Survey.

== Bibliography ==
- Bardon, Jonathan. The Plantation of Ulster. Gill & MacMillan, 2012.
- McCavitt, John. The Flight of the Earls. Gill & MacMillan, 2002.
- McGurk, John. Sir Henry Docwra, 1564-1631: Derry's Second Founder. Four Courts Press, Dublin, 2006.
