= McKevitt =

Family name

McKevitt is an Irish surname, found primarily in the northeastern area of Ireland. The family is a member of the ancient “Northern Ó Néill” group of clans who resided in the Ulster province of Ireland.

This surname is a variant of the name McDevitt, which itself is a side-branch of the larger O'Doherty family, who were the historic chiefs of the Inishowen peninsula in northern County Donegal. The O’Dohertys are named after Dochartach, a regional chief of the 10th century, and a member of the Cenél Conaill (clan group) dynasty which in early medieval Irish history traced itself to Niall of the Nine Hostages. Niall was a major Irish king who gave his name to the Uí Néill families of the northern and northwestern parts of Ireland.

The McDevitt family name arose with the 1208 death of Davitt O’Doherty, a lesser chieftain of the O'Doherty family. Thus, McDevitt = son of Davitt. Within the McDevitt name, the later split in pronunciation (D or K) occurred in the mid-1600s. In 1608 the unsuccessful rebellion of Cahir O'Doherty, then the chief (and assisted by his kinsman Phelim Reagh MacDavitt), led to the seizure of the O’Doherty lands by the English, and the dispossession of the McDevitt family. This uprising, with its defeat, was one of the major events leading to the Plantation of Ulster.

Directly after Cahir O'Doherty's rebellion and defeat, some of Phelim Reagh MacDavitt’s family relocated eastward into County Armagh, where they had kin among the O’Hanlon family. These McDevitts settled in the O’Neilland West Barony of Oriel. The name McKevitt originated there with the vocal “aspiration”, or the loss, of the “D” sound of Devitt, with the “K” sound being carried over; thus McKevitt. By 1700 this family name was evidently established and being used in the local region. Up until the latter half of the 19th Century, the McKevitt family lived mainly in Armagh, but they had also moved south into neighboring County Louth and east into County Down. In the 1740 Corn Census of County Louth, one recorded spelling was McCevid.

In the modern world, the McKevitts, although still a small family, reside in all levels of society. They have spread throughout Ireland, into the U.K., to Canada, to the U.S., and into Australia. Today there are also several spelling variations, such as McCavitt and McEvitt. In the Irish language, the name is written Mac Dhaibhéid.

== Notable people ==
The name McKevitt may refer to:

- Anne McKevitt (born 1967), entrepreneur, TV personality, author and philanthropist
- Bernadette Sands McKevitt (born 1958), Irish republican, and a former leading member of the 32 County Sovereignty Movement
- Donna McKevitt (born 1970), English composer
- Frank McKevitt, the head coach for the Gonzaga University men's basketball team during the 1910-11 basketball season
- Karen McKevitt (born 1971), Northern Irish politician
- Michael McKevitt (1949-2021), Irish republican who was convicted of directing terrorism as the leader of the paramilitary organisation, the Real IRA
- Mike McKevitt (1928–2000), U.S. Representative from Colorado
- Peter McKevitt (1900–1976), Irish Roman Catholic priest, author, and sociologist
- Steve McKevitt (born 1966), English writer and academic
- Thomas McKevitt (born 1971), represents District 17 in the New York Assembly, which includes large portions of Nassau County, New York
