= Hugh Boy MacDavitt =

Hugh Boy MacDavitt (Irish: Aodh Buidhe Mac Daibheid) was a Gaelic Irish warrior from Inishowen. He was the brother of Phelim Reagh MacDavitt and the foster brother of Sir Cahir O'Doherty. Cahir had a strong claim to succeed as chief of the O'Doherty's, the dominant clan on Inishowen. Because of this he was captured by Red Hugh O'Donnell, who supported a rival candidate. The MacDavitt brothers succeeded in rescuing him. They had previously sided with the rebels during the Nine Years War, with Hugh Boy making a failed attempt to capture Culmore Fort. They now switched to support the Crown and allied themselves to Sir Henry Docwra, the English Governor of Derry.

On 11 August 1602 MacDavitt was killed during fighting near Omagh. He was later praised by Docwra as "a man whom I found faithful and honest".

== Bibliography ==
- Falls, Cyril. Elizabeth's Irish Wars. Constable, 1996.
- Bradley, Jim & Dooher, John. The fair river valley: Strabane through the ages. Ulster Historical Foundation, 2000.
- McGurk, John. Sir Henry Docwra, 1564-1631: Derry's Second Founder. Four Courts Press, 2006.
