= Richard Wingfield, 1st Viscount Powerscourt (first creation) =

English army officer and military administrator

The Right Honourable Richard Wingfield PC
- Viscount Powerscourt
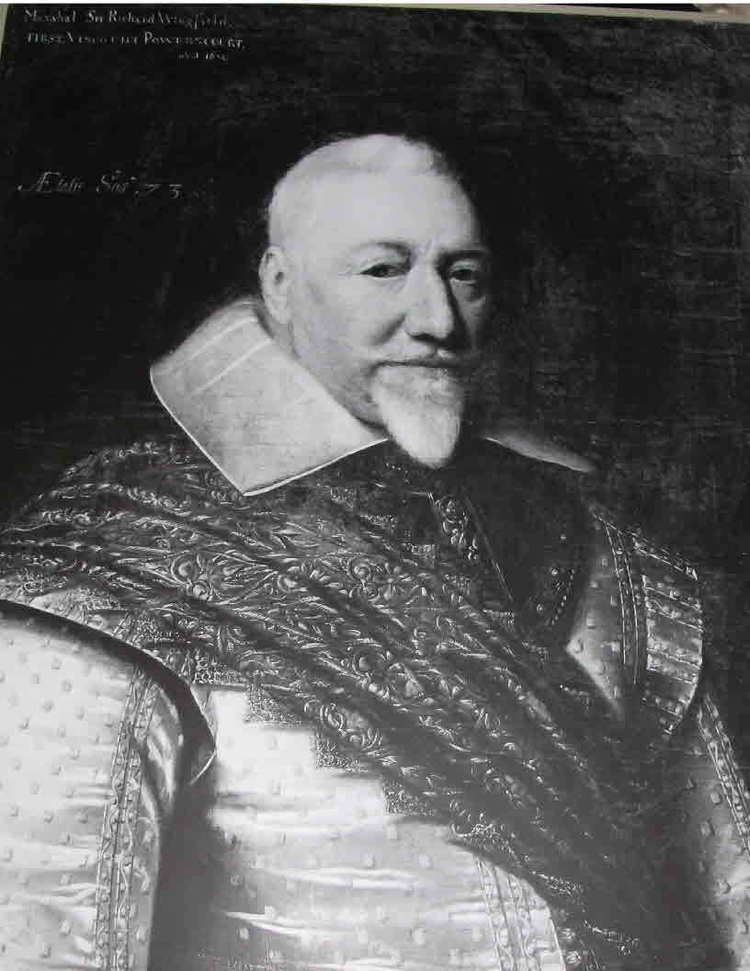
- Richard Wingfield, 1st Viscount Powerscourt, 1618 by Cornelis Janssens van Ceulen
- Born: c. 1551
- Died: 9 September 1634 (aged 82–83)
- Residence: Powerscourt
- Noble family: Wingfield
- Spouse: Frances Rugge (died 1631)
- Father: Sir Richard Wingfield
- Mother: Christian Fitzwilliam
- Occupation: Army officer; Military administrator

Richard Wingfield, 1st Viscount Powerscourt, PC (c. 1551 – 9 September 1634) was an English-born army officer and military administrator during the reigns of Elizabeth I and James I. He is notable for his defeat of Sir Cahir O'Doherty's forces at the 1608 Battle of Kilmacrennan during O'Doherty's Rebellion in Ireland.

== Family ==
Sir Richard Wingfield was the eldest son of Sir Richard Wingfield, Governor of Portsmouth, who was descended from an old Suffolk family, and Christian, daughter of Sir William Fitzwilliam of Milton, Castor, Northamptonshire, and sister of Sir William Fitzwilliam, Lord Deputy of Ireland. He became the step-son of Sir George Delves, after his mother's remarriage.

== Early career ==
He came to Ireland as a military adventurer in the latter part of the 16th century and afterwards fought in Flanders, France and Portugal, gaining the military rank of lieutenant colonel.

Returning to Ireland, Wingfield distinguished himself and was wounded in an expedition against Tyrone, and was knighted by the Lord Deputy, William Russell, in Christ Church Cathedral on 9 November 1595. He served as a colonel in the expedition against Calais, and in 1600 was advanced to the office of Marshal of Ireland, with a retinue of fifty horse and a company of foot. In 1601 during the 4th Spanish Armada, he led a force at the reduction of Kinsale, and was one of those who signed the articles of capitulation made between the Lord Deputy of Ireland and Don Juan del Águila, commander of the Spanish troops made prisoners on that occasion.

== O'Doherty's Rebellion ==
In May 1608 during O'Doherty's Rebellion he marched into Ulster against Sir Cahir O'Doherty, who had burnt Derry, killing him and dispersing his followers. For this success Sir Richard was on 29 June 1609 rewarded by a grant of the Powerscourt Estate in County Wicklow.

== Later career ==
In the Parliament of Ireland of 1613–15, he sat in the Irish House of Commons as MP for Downpatrick.

On 19 February 1618, he was created Viscount Powerscourt, and he subsequently enjoyed several important offices under the Crown.

== Marriage ==
He married Frances Rugge (d. 30 November 1631), daughter of William Rugge, of Felmingham, Norfolk, and Thomasine Townshend, and widow of Edward Cromwell, 3rd Baron Cromwell. Frances Cromwell, the elder of her two daughters, married Sir John Wingfield of Tickencote, Rutland in January 1619. Her younger daughter, Anne Cromwell, married her husband's cousin, Sir Edward Wingfield of Carnew, County Wicklow on 9 May 1619.

== Death ==
He died on 9 September 1634, without issue from his wife, Frances and his title, therefore, became extinct. His estates passed to his cousin, Sir Edward Wingfield. The title was revived in 1665 in the person of Folliott Wingfield, 1st Viscount Powerscourt, who died without issue in 1717; and again in 1743 for Richard Wingfield.

== Notes ==
Attribution

Peerage of Ireland
New creation	Viscount Powerscourt; First creation 1618–1634	Extinct
