= Burning of Derry =

Battle of O'Doherty's Rebellion (1608)

- Part of O'Doherty's Rebellion
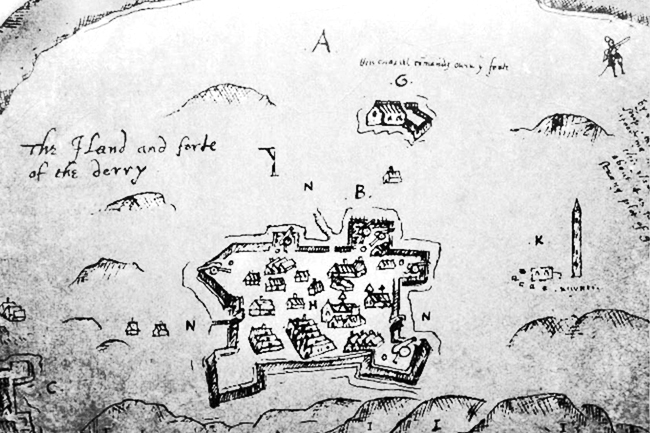
- A map of Derry around the time of the rebellion
Date	19 April 1608
Location	Derry, Ireland
Result	Rebel victory: Derry is destroyed.

Belligerents
Kingdom of Ireland	Rebels

Commanders and leaders
Sir George Paulet	Sir Cahir O'Doherty; Phelim Reagh MacDavitt

Strength
Around 100	Around 100

The Burning of Derry took place on 19 April 1608 during O'Doherty's Rebellion when Sir Cahir O'Doherty led a force of rebels to storm Derry in Ulster. He launched his rebellion with an attack on the garrison town of Derry, which was taken thanks to the element of surprise. The town was then almost entirely destroyed by fire.

== Background ==
O'Doherty was the Gaelic Lord of Inishowen. He had been allied with the government during the Nine Years' War (1594–1603), and has been described as "a youthful war hero on the side of the crown". During the conflict, he fought alongside Sir Henry Docwra's troops from the key base of Derry. O'Doherty, along with other pro-English Irish lords, was unhappy when the Treaty of Mellifont restored the leading rebels, Hugh O'Neill, Earl of Tyrone and Rory O'Donnell, 1st Earl of Tyrconnell, to land which had been promised to them.

O'Doherty was further unsettled when his friend and ally Docwra was replaced as Governor of Derry by Sir George Paulet. In the years following the war Paulet continually confronted and antagonized O'Doherty, who appealed to the Dublin government which generally sided with Paulet. O'Doherty attempted to use his contacts in London to secure himself a role as a courtier which would have given him much greater influence, and sought a position in the household of Henry, Prince of Wales.

Continued disputes with Paulet pushed O'Doherty to finally undertake a rebellion, which he seems to have begun on the spur of the moment. Unknown to him, the very day that he began his rising the London government had approved his request to join the Prince of Wales, and had generally sided with him against the Dublin administration.

== Seizure ==
After tricking his friend Captain Henry Hart, by inviting him to dinner and then taking him prisoner, O'Doherty was able to take control of Culmore Fort, the post that Hart commanded. This was a major arsenal, which he used to arm his supporters. At 2AM, O'Doherty led around seventy to a hundred followers against the nearby town of Derry.

Although the garrison numbered somewhere as high as a hundred soldiers, with many other men among the civilian population who could bear arms, they were completely taken by surprise as no sentries had been posted. O'Doherty was able to take the lower fort without bloodshed, but his deputy Phelim MacDavitt had harder work in the higher fort. Some resistance was led by a Lieutenant Gordon, but was quickly overwhelmed and killed. Around half a dozen men were killed on each side during the brief fighting at Derry Fort.

In the town itself O'Doherty and his men hunted down his enemies. The Governor George Paulet was reportedly killed by Phelim MacDavitt near his house, while O'Doherty targeted a sheriff named Harrison. However, several other officials sought by O'Doherty were absent. The remaining settlers took shelter in the residence of Bishop George Montgomery, who was also absent at the time. They surrendered to O'Doherty who assured them that "it was not blood that he sought for". O'Doherty's actions suggest that he was principally targeting those he personally considered his enemies, rather than contemplating a wholesale massacre.

== Burning ==
The "infant city" of Derry was destroyed, with all of its eighty five houses burnt including the Bishop's residence. Montgomery was a friend of O'Doherty's and had sided with him in his dispute with Paulet, whom he had himself had difficulties with. Nonetheless the insurgents set fire to Montgomery's house and library, despite being offered £100 to spare the two thousand books there. The destruction of the books was because they were considered heretical by the Catholic rebels, rather than "an act of mindless, wanton destruction"

Some prisoners were released shortly afterwards, but more important figures including the wife and sister of Bishop Montgomery were detained as hostages. These prisoners were taken away to O'Doherty's residence at Burt Castle in Donegal. For their participation in the burning, the MacDavitts became known by their Protestant neighbours as the "Burn-Derrys" although this name is sometimes also applied to O'Doherty himself.

News of the fall of Derry caused alarm in Dublin, partly because the Irish Army was very small at the time and it was not prepared to respond to the northern uprising. Paulet was widely blamed for the defeat as he was disliked by his soldiers and settlers, had antagonized local inhabitants such as O'Doherty and had not taken basic military preparations such as posting a night watch. He had ignored warnings sent to him by Richard Hansard, the commander at Lifford, about suspicious activities in the area just days earlier. It was observed that had "not the rebels taken away his life, it could not in justice have been left him by the state".

== Aftermath ==
O'Doherty gathered support following his victory at Derry, and his forces ranged across Ulster burning several other settlements. O'Doherty possibly hoped that he would be offered a settlement by the government, as had happened during rebellions over previous decades, rather than risking a long and expensive war. This prospect was dashed by the quick response of Sir Arthur Chichester in Dublin who oversaw the dispatch of what reinforcements he could spare northwards and the raising of loyal Gaelic forces. They soon recaptured the burnt-out ruins of Derry. The main force of rebels were defeated at the Battle of Kilmacrennan, where O'Doherty was killed. A group of remaining rebels made a final stand at the Siege of Tory Island, but the rising had been overcome quickly.

One consequence of the rising was a major change in the planned Ulster Plantation, which had previously been intended to involve a few limited settlements, alongside a re-sharing of the lands among the loyalist Gaelic leaders. However, after O'Doherty's attack on Derry, the government no longer trusted many of the Gaelic leaders, even those who had not risen in revolt, and brought in a more ambitious scheme of importing large numbers of English and Scottish settlers. Gaelic leaders therefore got a smaller share of the land division than had been earlier planned. Derry was rebuilt following its destruction and was renamed 'Londonderry', becoming an integral part of the new plantation and the last walled city to be built in western Europe.

Its important strategic location made Derry the site of several further military actions throughout the Seventeenth Century during the Irish Confederate Wars and the Williamite War, most notably the 1689 Siege of Derry.

== Bibliography ==
- Bardon, Jonathan. The Plantation of Ulster. Gill & MacMillan, 2012.
- Connolly, S.J. Contested Island: Ireland 1460–1630. Oxford University Press, 2009.
- Lacy, Brian. Siege City: The Story of Derry and Londonderry. Blackstaff Press, 1990.
- McCavitt, John. The Flight of the Earls. Gill & MacMillan, 2002.
