= McDevitt =

Irish surname

McDevitt is an Irish surname, originating in County Donegal in the northwest part of Ireland. This family name is a member of the ancient Northern O’Néill group of clans who resided in the Ulster province of Ireland.

This surname developed as a side-branch of the larger O'Doherty family, who were the historic chiefs of the Inishowen peninsula in northern County Donegal. The McDevitt family name arose with the 1208 death of Davitt O’Doherty, a lesser chieftain within the O'Doherty family. Thus, McDevitt = son of Davitt. Later in Donegal, and working with the O'Doherty clan, the family was involved in several of the Irish Wars of the late 16th century. In 1608, the unsuccessful rebellion of Cahir O'Doherty (assisted by his kinsman Phelim Reagh MacDavitt), led to the seizure of the O’Doherty lands by the English, and the dispossession of the McDevitt family. This rebellion, with its defeat, was one of the major events leading to the Plantation of Ulster.

The O’Dohertys are named after Dochartach, a chief of the 10th century, and a member of the Cenél Conaill (clan group) dynasty which in medieval Irish history texts traced itself to Niall of the Nine Hostages. Niall was a major Irish king who gave his name to the Uí Néill families of the northern and northwestern parts of Ireland.

After Cahir O'Doherty's rebellion, some of Phelim Reagh MacDavitt’s family remained in Donegal, near the city of Derry. Others relocated to new areas, mainly eastward into County Armagh and County Louth. In those two counties, the family name branched phonetically and evolved into the McKevitt name, where the "D" sound was lightly-sounded and then lost. The two family names are now distinct, but remain related.

Today the McDevitts, although still a fairly small family name, reside in all areas of society in the modern world. Donegal remains their homeland, but they have spread throughout Ireland, into the U.K., to Canada, to the U.S., and into Australia. There are also several spelling variations now being used, such as McDavitt and McDivitt; as well as the distinct variants of McDaid and McDade. The McDaid spelling is today often-seen around Derry city and in northeast Donegal.

In the Irish language, the name is written Mac Daibhéid.

The name McDevitt may refer to:

- Charles F. McDevitt (1932–2021), Justice of the Idaho Supreme Court
- Chas McDevitt (born 1934), British musician
- Daniel F. McDevitt (1916-1965), American politician
- Darby McDevitt (born 1975), Screenwriter and game designer
- Hugh McDevitt (1930–2022), Immunologist
- Jack McDevitt, (born 1935), American science fiction author
- James McDevitt Magee (1877–1949), American politician
- James McDivitt (1929–2022), American astronaut, and Apollo Program Manager, 1969-1972
- John W. McDevitt (1906–1994), Eleventh Supreme Knight of the Knights of Columbus
- Mary McDevitt (1922–2022), Scottish singer known professionally as Mary Lee
- Philip R. McDevitt (1858-1935), American bishop
- Ruth McDevitt (1895–1976), American film actress
- Tom McDevitt, president of Washington Times
- Ty McDevitt (born 1993), American baseball coach for the Minnesota Golden Gophers

== See also ==
- Bishop McDevitt High School (Harrisburg, Pennsylvania), a school in the United States
- Phelim Reagh MacDavitt, Irish warrior
