= Richard Hansard =

English-born soldier

Sir Richard Hansard (c. 1550–1619) was an English-born soldier who served and settled in Ireland during the Tudor and Stuart eras. He fought for the Crown during Tyrone's Rebellion, during which he was given command of the key town of Ballyshannon in County Donegal.

He was born in Biscarthorpe in Lincolnshire. He was educated at the University of Cambridge after which he became a soldier. His wife Anne was the daughter of Sir Edward Martury of Genby. He served in Ireland in a number of places during the Nine Years War (1594–1603) and was governor of Lifford during the latter stages of the war and also during the rebellion of Sir Cahir O’Dogherty. He took part in the suppression of O'Doherty's Rebellion of 1608 and had warned the Governor George Paulet of danger shortly before the Burning of Derry which launched the uprising. As a reward for his services he was granted Lifford and the surrounding lands by James I and given permission to found a corporate town at Lifford as a veteran of the Nine Years War.

In his will he instructed his executors to build a church, a school and a school house in Lifford. He also set aside money from his lands to pay for a schoolmaster and other officials in the town.

== Bibliography ==
- Bardon, Jonathan. The Plantation of Ulster. Gill & MacMillan, 2012.
- McCavitt, John. The Flight of the Earls. Gill & MacMillan, 2002.
