= Burt Castle =

Ruined castle in County Donegal, Ireland

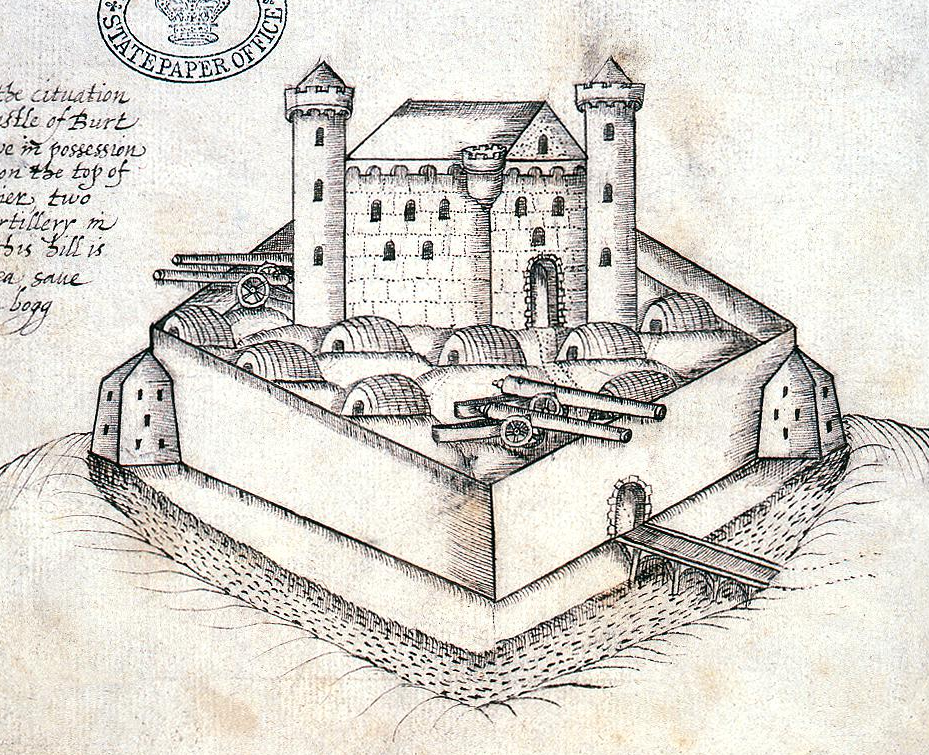
- 1601 illustration of Burt Castle
- Interactive map of Burt Castle
- 55°01′10″N 7°30′09″W
- Type: Castle

History
- Built: 16th century
- Built for: O'Doherty family
- Original use: Stronghold and defensive fortification

Site notes
- Owner: O'Doherty family (historically); Crown (after 1608 rebellion)

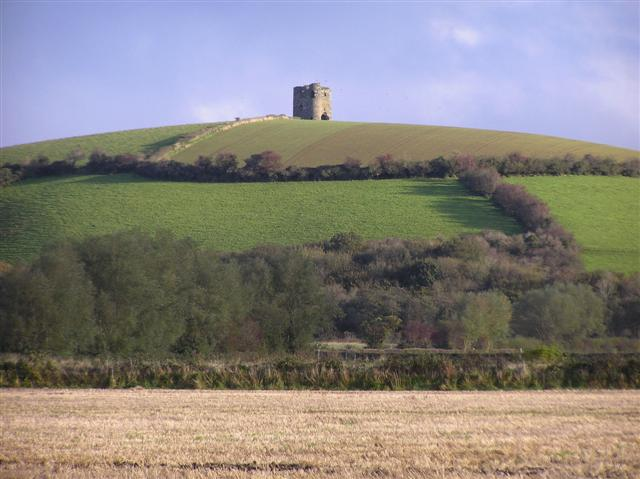
Burt Castle from Coney Island

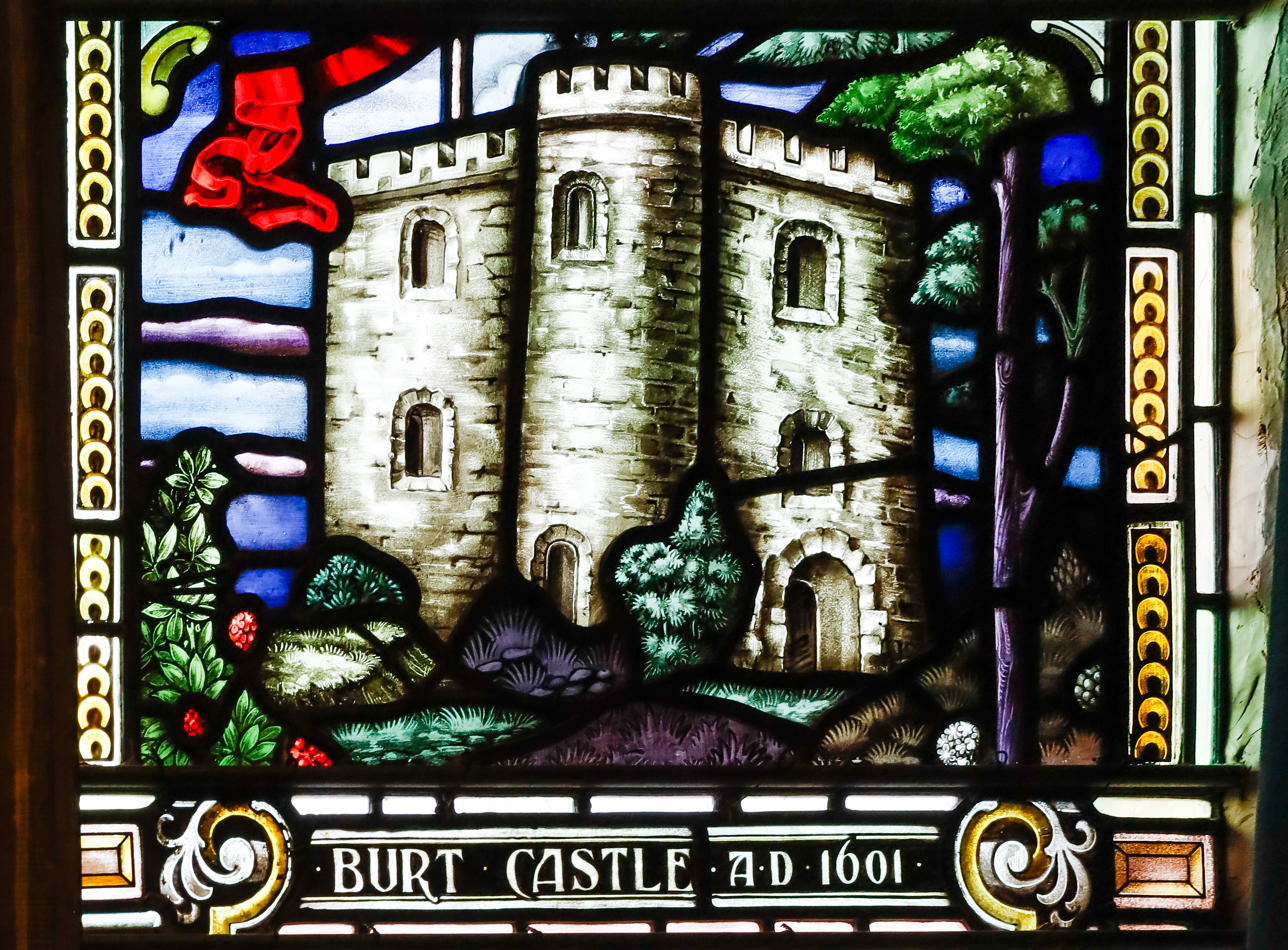
A stained glass depiction of Burt Castle in Derry's Guildhall

Burt Castle is a ruined castle located close to Newtowncunningham and Burt, two villages in the east of County Donegal in Ulster, Ireland. Historically it was sometimes spelt as Birt Castle. It is also known by the name O'Doherty's Castle, and should not be mistaken for O'Doherty's Keep near Buncrana.

The castle was constructed in the sixteenth century during the reign of Henry VIII. It was a traditional stronghold of the O'Doherty's, protecting the southern edge of their Inishowen Lordship. The design of the castle was strongly influenced by contemporary Z-Plan Scottish fortifications, and anticipated the style of buildings constructed during the Ulster Plantation of the following century.

During a disputed succession in 1600, the Crown's Governor of Derry, Sir Henry Docwra, backed the successful candidate, the fifteen-year-old Sir Cahir O'Doherty. O'Doherty wished to break free of the overlordship of Red Hugh O'Donnell and fought on the Crown's side during the Nine Years' War and was knighted for his bravery. Burt Castle was a vital post because it controlled a strategic area, allowing Docwra to bring in food supplies and to open up an offensive again O'Donnell. A garrison of a hundred men under Captain John Vaughan were stationed there.

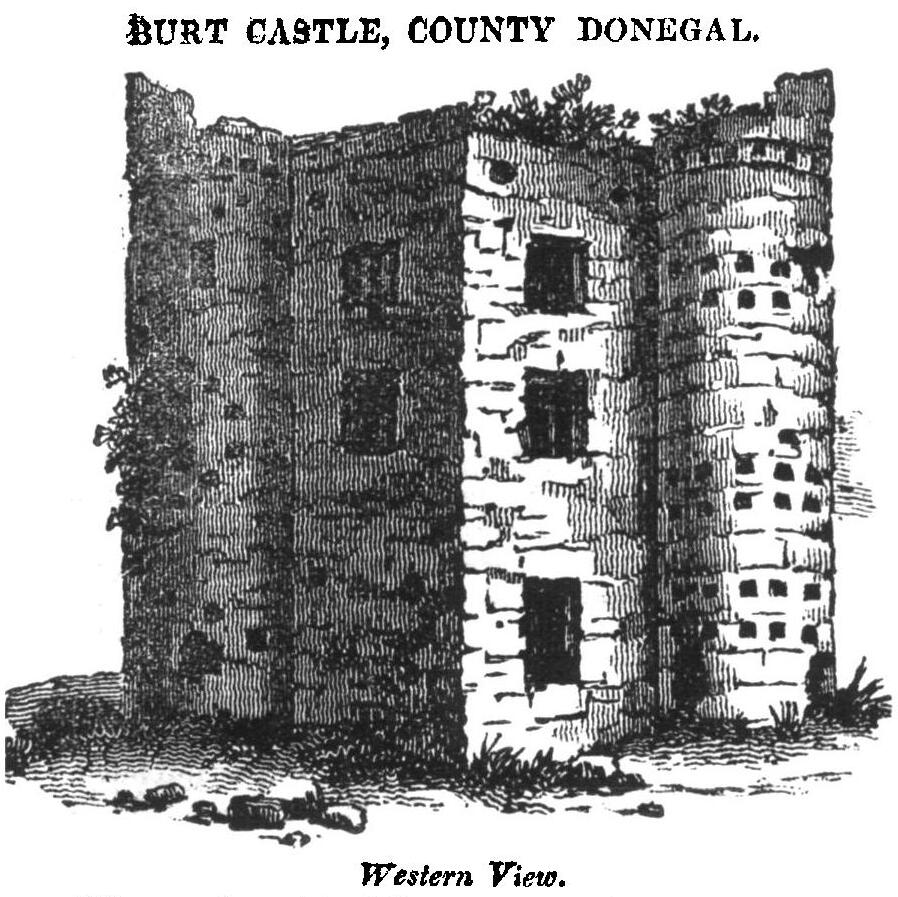
A western view of the castle, Dublin Penny Journal, 1833

Following the war O'Doherty continued in his loyalty to the Crown but in 1608, after a dispute with the new Governor of Derry, O'Doherty rose in revolt with the castle as his headquarters. The Burning of Derry in April triggered what became known as O'Doherty's Rebellion. In response the Dublin authorities sent troops to overrun O'Doherty's Inishowen heartlands. After a siege they captured Burt Castle and freed the prisoners taken at Derry who were being held there. Shortly afterwards O'Doherty was killed at the Battle of Kilmacrennan and the rebellion collapsed.

During the Williamite War, the castle was the site of a skirmish between Jacobite forces and troops under the overall command of General Percy Kirke who were supporting William III.
