= McDaid =

McDaid is an Irish surname, originating in northwest Ireland. Meaning ' son of David' The name is most often an alternate spelling of the McDevitt family name. Both of these names are offshoots of the larger O'Doherty Irish clan. Notable people with the McDaid surname include:

- Matthew McDaid (born 1994), Northern Irish musician
- Danny McDaid (born 1941), Irish runner
- David McDaid (born 1990), Northern Irish footballer
- Hugh McDaid, Northern Irish football manager
- James Pat McDaid, Irish Gaelic footballer and politician
- Jim McDaid (born 1949), Irish medical doctor and politician
- John McDaid (1909-?), Irish footballer
- Johnny McDaid (born 1976), Northern Irish musician
- Kevin McDaid (born 1984), Nigerian-born British singer
- Kevin McDaid, Northern Irish murder victim
- Richard McDaid (born 1975), Irish cricketer
- Sean McDaid (born 1986), English-born Scottish footballer
- Cillian McDaid (born 1997), Irish Gaelic footballer plays for Galway ==See also==
- McDaid's Football Special, an Irish soft drink
