= George Paulet (1553–1608) =

English soldier

Sir George Paulet
- Born: George Paulet; 1553; Crondall, Hampshire, England
- Died: 1608 (aged 54–55); Derry, Kingdom of Ireland
- Occupation: Governor of Derry
- Spouse: Jane Kyme
- Children: Frances
- Parent(s): Sir George Paulet; Elizabeth Windsor

Sir George Paulet (1553–1608), also known as Pawlett, Pawlet, or Powlet, was an English soldier and administrator. He served as governor of Derry in Ireland. His arrogant and insolent behaviour caused O'Doherty's Rebellion in 1608. Paulet was killed by the rebels during the Burning of Derry.

== Birth and origins ==
George was born in 1553 in England, a son of Sir George Paulet and his third wife Elizabeth Windsor. His father was Sir George Paulet (died 1558) of Crondall, Hampshire. His father's eldest brother William was created Earl of Wiltshire in 1550 and Marquess of Winchester 1551.

George's mother was a daughter of William Windsor, 2nd Baron Windsor.

George was one of 10 siblings.

== Early life ==
Paulet was educated at Eton, 1564–72, and at King's College, Cambridge, 1572-5. His contemporaries call Paulet a gentleman of Hampshire.

== Marriage and children ==
Before 1586 Paulet married Joan Kyme, daughter of Richard Kyme of Lewes, Sussex, and his wife Margery Humphrey. George and Joan had a son and a daughter: Nothing seems to be know about the son. The daughter's name was Frances.

== Later life ==
Paulet was a Justice of the peace in Hampshire 1593–1601.

In 1606 he was appointed governor of Derry in Ireland by letters of 20 and 23 July 1606 from King James I to Mountjoy, the Lord Lieutenant of Ireland. These letters speak of his service in the wars. The appointment was obtained through the influence of his cousin John Paulet, 2nd Marquess of Winchester NOTE, the 2nd Marquess of Winchester was dead at this time, so it must have been his son who was the 3rd Marquess of Winchester per Wikipedia for the 2nd and 3rd marquesses of Winchester, who knew Mountjoy, the Lord Deputy of Ireland. Paulet replaced Henry Docwra.

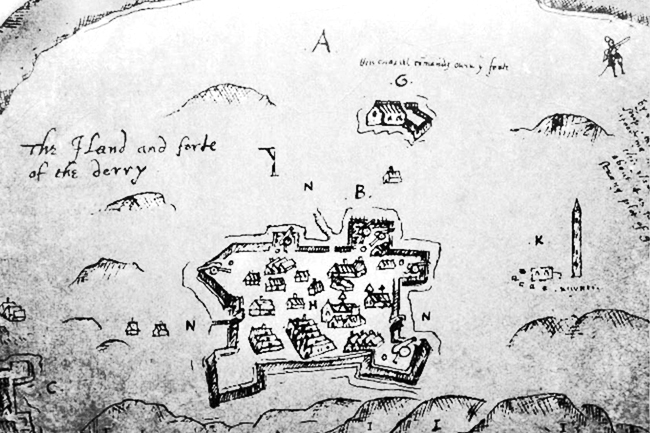
One of the oldest depictions of fort Derry, Ireland. Derry was sacked and burned by the O'Doherty & McDavitt clans in 1608.

Paulet began at Derry by buying land from Docwra, who had built a town there more than thirty years after the destruction of Randolph's settlement. Docwra incurred the hostility of Charles Blount, 8th Baron Mountjoy (who became Earl of Devonshire), Lord Deputy of Ireland, by supporting Donnell Ballagh O'Cahan, Sir Cahir O'Doherty, and Niall Garve O'Donnell, who he thought had been ill-treated. James I agreed with Devonshire on Irish policy, about the desirability of ruling Ulster through Hugh Ó Neill, 2nd Earl of Tyrone and Rory Ó Donnell, 1st Earl of Tyrconnell, without much regard for minor chiefs. Devonshire died 3 April 1606; but he had previously approved the sale of Docwra's property to Paulet, whom he knew well. Docwra accordingly sold him his house, land which he had bought, and his company of foot, at a low price. The vice-provostship of Derry was thrown in without extra charge.

The new governor was established at Derry in the early winter of 1606, and on 20 February following Sir Arthur Chichester, the new Lord Deputy, told Robert Cecil, 1st Earl of Salisbury that he was unfit for the place, and that there had been many dissensions since his arrival. He fell out with George Montgomery, the new bishop of Derry, over land claims. Tyrone and Tyrconnell fled from Ireland early in September 1607 (the Flight of the Earls); O'Cahan, who ruled the greater part of what is now County Londonderry, and of O'Doherty, the chief of Inishowen in County Donegal, came under some suspicion. Docwra had tried to divide these chiefs from the Earls, but Paulet had his own ideas on handling them.

Paulet was knighted in 1607.

O'Doherty put some armed men on Tory Island, but this seems to have been done with the consent of the few inhabitants. Sir Richard Hansard, who commanded for the Plantation of Ulster at Lifford in Donegal, recounts that O'Doherty left Burt Castle, on Lough Swilly, at the end of October to superintend the felling of timber for building; but that this gave rise to a report that he was in rebellion. He then began to arm about seventy followers, refusing all recruits from outside his own district. Paulet made an unsuccessful attempt to seize Burt in the chief's absence, and reported everything to Chichester. O'Doherty remonstrated with him in a temperate letter; Paulet then (falsely) denied that he had ever intended to surprise Burt, and accused O'Doherty of treason. O'Doherty went to Dublin early in December and made his excuses to Chichester, who accepted them, but without much confidence. On 18 April the privy council ordered him to be fully restored to such of his ancestral lands as were still withheld, but this order did not reach the Irish government until he was actually in rebellion.

== O'Doherty's Rebellion ==
The Annals of the Four Masters state that Paulet struck O'Doherty; there is more support for the idea that Paulet provoked O'Doherty into rebellion by insults. Paulet's carelessness invited attack, though Chichester warned him repeatedly to keep good watch. On the night of Monday, 18 April 1608, O'Doherty, at the head of fewer than a hundred men, seized the outpost at Culmore by a trick, and surprised Derry itself an hour before daybreak. Paulet was killed by O'Doherty's foster-father Phelim Reagh MacDavitt, and the city was sacked and burned. Sir Josias Bodley, not however an eye-witness, reported that Paulet fell fighting valiantly; but the English government spoke of his cowardice. Paulet had been warned by Richard Hansard, who held his own against the rebels at Lifford.

Despite the early success at Derry, O'Doherty's Rebellion was defeated by the swift response of the Dublin government. A force was sent out which recovered the ruins of Derry and killed O'Doherty at the Battle of Kilmacrennan.

Paulet's wife was with him at Derry, and the contemporary tract Newes from Ireland concerning the late treacherous Action; (London, 1608) says he had children there also. Lady Paulet was held captive by the O'Doherties for a short time; but her husband's death left her in poverty, which was partly relieved out of the Tyrone forfeitures. She was alive in 1617.

== Notes and references ==
=== Citations ===
Attribution

This article incorporates text from a publication now in the public domain: "Paulet, George". Dictionary of National Biography. London: Smith, Elder & Co. 1885–1900.

=== Sources ===
- Bagwell, Richard (1895). "Paulet, Sir George (d.1608)". In Lee, Sidney (ed.). Dictionary of National Biography. Vol. XLIV. New York: MacMillan and Co. pp. 86–87. OCLC 1043016801.
- Barry, Judy (October 2009). McGuire, James; Quinn, James (eds.). "Paulet, Sir George". Dictionary of Irish Biography.
- Burke, Bernard; Burke, Ashworth Peter (1915). A Genealogical and Heraldic History of the Peerage and Baronetage, the Privy Council, Knightage and Companionage (77th ed.). London: Harrison. OCLC 1155471554.
- Cokayne, George Edward (1898). Complete Peerage of England, Scotland, Ireland, Great Britain and the United Kingdom, Extant, Extinct, or Dormant. Vol. VIII (1st ed.). London: George Bell and Sons. – U to Z
- Hasler, P. W., ed. (1981). The House of Commons 1558 – 1603. Vol. II. London: His/Her Majesty's Stationery Office. ISBN 0-11-887501-9. – M to Z
- Hunter, R. J. (2004). "Paulet, Sir George (1553–1608)". In Matthew, Colin; Harrison, Brian (eds.). Oxford Dictionary of National Biography. Vol. 43. New York: Oxford University Press. pp. 155–156. ISBN 0-19-861393-8.
- Shaw, William A. (1906). The Knights of England. Vol. II. London: Sherratt & Hughes. – Knights bachelors & Index
- Venn, John; Venn, J. A. (1924). Alumni Cantabrigienses: Part 1: From the Earliest Times to 1751. Vol. III. London: Cambridge University Press. OCLC 1039474173. – Kaile to Ryves
