= Baron Docwra of Culmore =

Baron Docwra of Culmore was a title in the Peerage of Ireland. It was created in 1621 for the leading soldier and statesman Sir Henry Docwra. He was born at Thatcham in Berkshire, saw much military service in Ireland and was successively Governor of Derry, Treasurer of War for Ireland and Joint Keeper of the Great Seal of Ireland.

On his death in 1631 the title passed to his eldest son Theodore. Theodore, unlike his father, played no part in public life, and little is known of him, except that his father's death left him impoverished (Henry had never accumulated riches), and he was obliged to sell part of his Irish estates. He died in England in 1647, without issue, when the title became extinct.

== Baron Docwra of Culmore (1621) ==
- Henry Docwra, 1st Baron Docwra of Culmore (1564–1631)
- Theodore Docwra, 2nd Baron Docwra of Culmore (1606–1647)
