= Homefront (1994 TV series) =

British television series

Home Front is an interior design "makeover" TV show airing on the BBC. The programme appeared in two formats.

The original format was a half-hour show hosted by Tessa Shaw, which ran c.1992-1997 and featured numerous different designers giving advice on DIY projects.

The second was an hour-long makeover show presented by Laurence Llewelyn-Bowen and Diarmuid Gavin. The seasons 1996-2000 (and also the seasons 1997-2000 of Home Front in the Garden) were hosted by Anne McKevitt. This version originally aired concurrently with the original format as a spin-off titled Home Front Inside Out, but took on the title of the parent programme when the original format was axed.

A variant titled Home Front in the Garden also aired, hosted by Shaw and featuring Diarmuid Gavin and Kevin McCloud.
