= Culmore =

Village near Derry, Northern Ireland

Culmore Cúil Mór
- Village
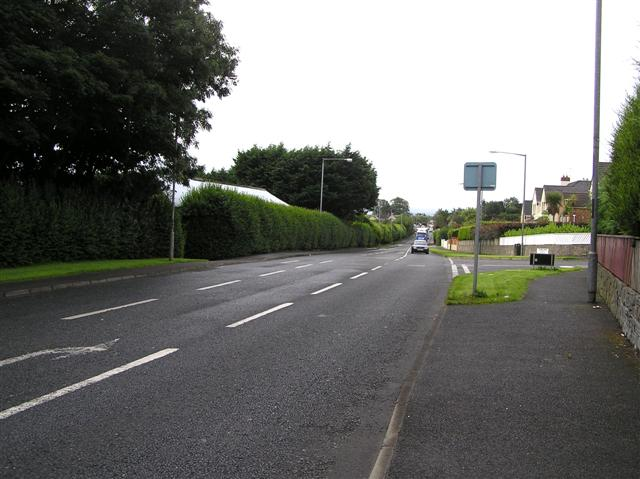
- A2 road at Culmore

- Location in Northern Ireland
- Coordinates: 55°03′N 7°16′W
- Sovereign state: United Kingdom
- Country: Northern Ireland
- County: County Londonderry
- City: Derry

Culmore (from Irish Cúil Mór, meaning 'the great corner') is a village and townland in Derry, County Londonderry, Northern Ireland. It is at the mouth of the River Foyle. In the 2011 Census it had a population of 3,465 people. It is situated within Derry and Strabane district.

== History ==
=== Nine Years' War ===
Sir Henry Docwra, 1st Baron Docwra of Culmore, was an English soldier who landed with a force of 4000 foot and 200 horse troops at Culmore on 16 May 1600, as part of an attempt to quell a war against the crown in Ulster. On 22 May he marched into Derry without resistance and occupied and fortified the town. From here he harassed some local Irish in such as a way as to make them sue for peace with him. Facing stronger local Irish opposition, Docwra's troops became almost prisoners, unable to make any progress while slowly starving until some powerful Irish became allies. For his service Docwra was granted 2000 acres (8 km^{2}) in the Precinct of Liffer. He served as Governor of Loughfoyle, and on 15 May 1621, by a patent dated at Westminster, was created Baron Docwra of Culmore. He was also Treasurer at War and a member of the Privy Council. Sir Henry died on 18 April 1631.

=== O'Doherty's Rebellion ===
Culmore Fort was an important strategic position linked to the garrison town of Derry. In 1608 when Sir Cahir O'Doherty, a formerly loyal Gaelic leader, launched O'Doherty's Rebellion by seizing and burning Derry, he began by first capturing a supply of arms from the arsenal at Culmore after capturing its commander Captain Henry Hart.

=== Recent history ===
Amelia Earhart landed in a pasture at Culmore after her 1932 transatlantic solo flight. A small museum, the Amelia Earhart Centre, has been built there, but the museum is presently closed due to its funding having been cut by Derry City Council.

== Transport ==
Culmore railway station opened on 1 October 1853 and closed on 2 July 1973, although the station was on the opposite side of Lough Foyle to where Culmore is situated today. There is still a bus service every hour from Monday to Saturday and every 2 hours on Sunday as part of the Foyle Metro service operating as the 1A bus to Muff via Culmore Point.

== Sport ==
- Sailing is a popular activity on the River Foyle and Lough Foyle.
- In early September 2017, a new Gaelic football club named Culmore Cú Chulainn GAA was established with about 30 members.

== Demography ==
At the 2011 Census, Culmore had a population of 3,465 people. Of which:

- 92.03% were from a Catholic background and 6.06% were from a Protestant or other Christian background
