= Phelim Reagh MacDavitt =

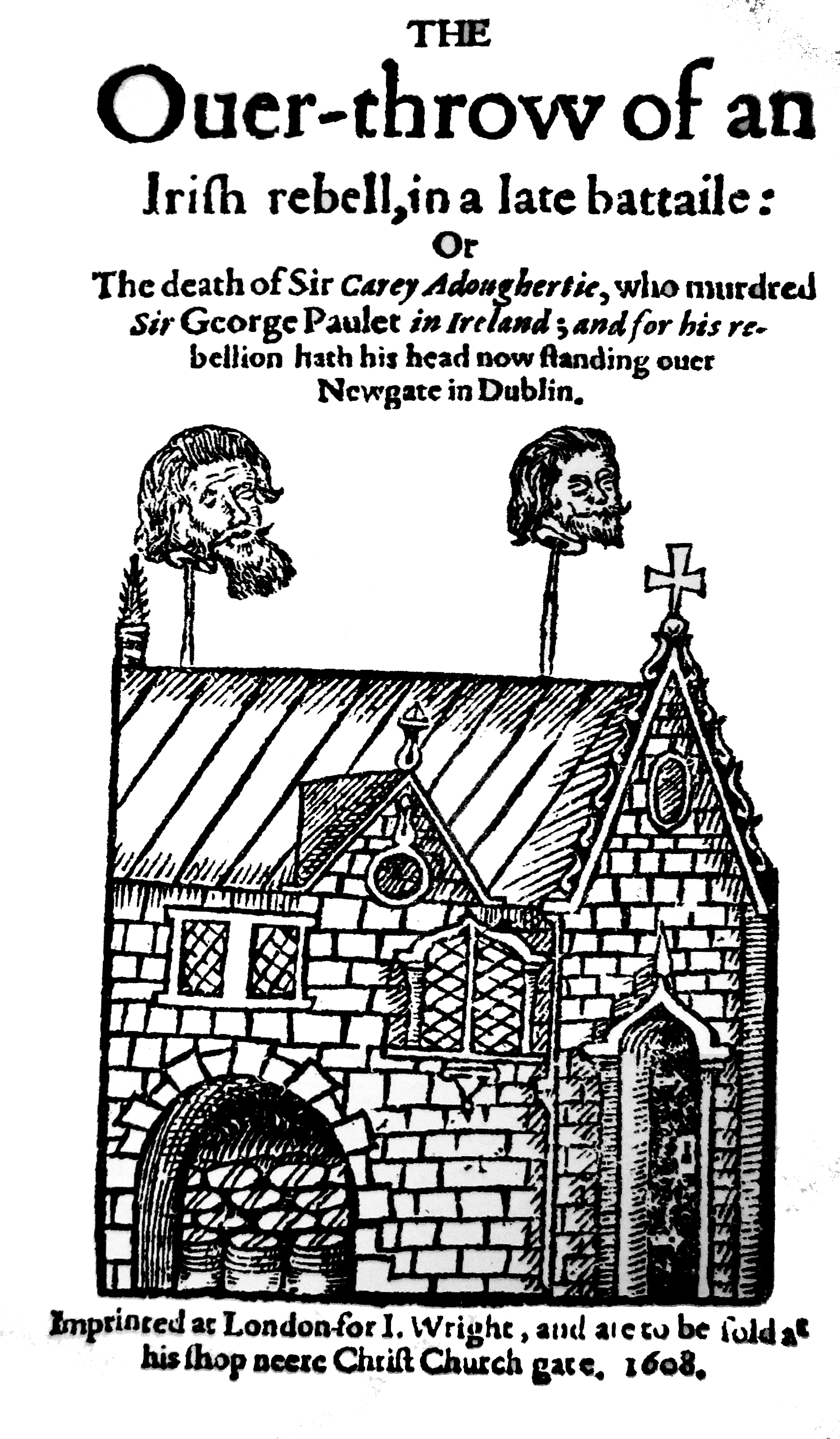
- A contemporary illustration showing the severed heads of MacDavitt (left) and Sir Cahir O'Doherty on display on the walls of Dublin.
- Born: Kingdom of Ireland
- Died: 1608; Lifford, County Donegal, Ireland
- Cause of death: Execution
- Occupations: Landowner, Warrior
- Known for: O'Doherty's Rebellion

Phelim Reagh MacDavitt or Phelim Reagh MacDevitt (Irish: Feidhlimidh Riabhach Mac Dhaibheid, or Brindled Felim - probably a reference to a white streak or streaks in his hair) was a Gaelic Irish warrior and landowner notable for his participation in the Nine Years War and later in O'Doherty's Rebellion in 1608. After playing a leading part in the Burning of Derry, he was captured and executed following the Battle of Kilmacrennan.

== Tyrone's Rebellion ==
The MacDavitts were from Inishowen, in northern Donegal, directly north of the English bastion of Derry. They were foster brothers (some sources say foster fathers) of Cahir O'Doherty, who had the strongest claim to succeed as Chief of Clan O'Doherty. When Red Hugh O'Donnell kidnapped Cahir during the Nine Years War, Phelim Reagh and his brother Hugh Boy MacDavitt changed sides, having previously supported O'Donnell and the rising of the Irish clans against the House of Tudor and the Reformation in Ireland. They now rescued Cahir from captivity and had him proclaimed as Chief of the Name of Clan O'Doherty and Lord of Inishowen by Henry Docwra, English governor of Derry. Both Cahir and his foster brothers served with distinction on the Crown's side during the war. They were disappointed when the Treaty of Mellifont 1603 restored lands to the rebels that had been promised to them.

Both Cahir O'Doherty and Phelim Reagh had problems with local government officials in the years after the war, once the more friendly Docwra had been replaced, and both felt they were being pushed into rebellion by their treatment. This came to a head when O'Doherty was ordered to hand over Phelim Reagh because he was wanted for arrest over allegations that had been made. O'Doherty reluctantly turned him over, but applied for his release. Eventually his lobbying was successful, and Reagh was freed just in time for him to take part in the rebellion.

== O'Doherty's Rebellion ==
=== Burning of Derry ===
O'Doherty planned to begin the rebellion by seizing the garrison town of Derry. MacDavitt helped lead the initial attack and capture of the Upper Fort of Derry. He was on hand when the city's Governor George Paulet (who was intensely disliked by both Protestant planters and local Gaels) was killed. Derry was then burned to the ground.

=== Kilmacrennan ===
MacDavitt was at the decisive battle fought near Kilmacrennan where O'Doherty was killed and the rebels suffered a heavy defeat. After the battle, MacDavitt was cornered by a group of soldiers. He put up fierce resistance and was wounded and captured.

MacDavitt was the most senior rebel to be executed. He was taken to Lifford, found guilty of high treason by a civilian court, and sentenced to be hanged, drawn and quartered. His and O'Doherty's severed heads were exhibited on spikes on the walls of Dublin's Newgate Prison, a common display at the time as this prison was the main prison of Dublin, the centre of English authority in Ireland and the Irish counterpart of the prison of the same name in London.

The participation of Phelim Reagh MacDavitt and others of the MacDavitts in the attack and destruction of Derry led to them becoming known as the "burn-Derrys".

== Bibliography ==
- Bardon, Jonathan. The Plantation of Ulster. Gill & MacMillan, 2012.
- Falls, Cyril. Elizabeth's Irish Wars. Constable, 1996.
- McCavitt, John. The Flight of the Earls. Gill & MacMillan, 2002.
- McGurk, John. Sir Henry Docwra, 1564-1631: Derry's Second Founder. Dublin: Four Courts Press, 2006.
