= Crookham, Berkshire =

Coordinates: 51°22′34″N 1°13′52″W

Crookham
- Hamlet
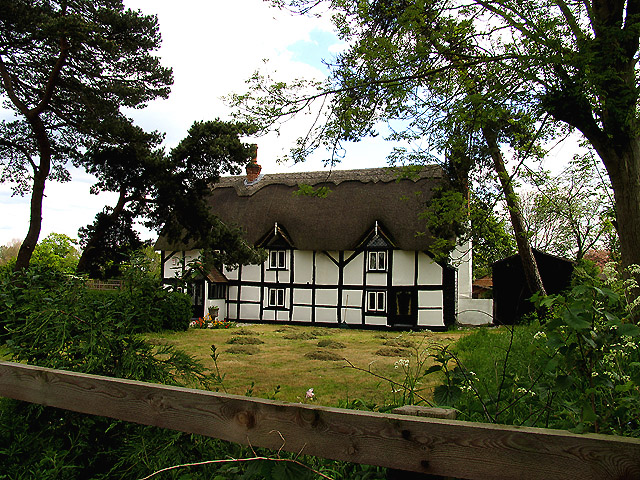
- "Old Thatch"

- Location within Berkshire
- OS grid reference: SU536641
- Metropolitan borough: West Berkshire
- Metropolitan county: Berkshire
- Region: South East
- Country: England
- Sovereign state: United Kingdom
- Post town: Thatcham
- Postcode district: RG19
- Dialling code: 0118
- Police: Thames Valley
- Fire: Royal Berkshire
- Ambulance: South Central
- UK Parliament: Newbury

Crookham is a dispersed hamlet in the English county of Berkshire, and part of the civil parish of Thatcham.

== Geography ==
The settlement lies near the A339 and A4 roads, and is located approximately 4 miles (6.4 km) south-east of Thatcham (where, according to the grid reference, the majority of the 2011 census population was included). Crookham – like the adjoining Crookham Common – is situated at the end of the former runway of RAF Greenham Common.

== History ==
Immediately before 1066, Crookham was owned by Alwi Ceuresbert, a King's thane. Crookham appears in the Domesday Book under Thatcham Hundred. It was later, about 1125, granted to Reading Abbey. There was only one manor and this was sublet to various families, some of whom hosted Royal visits, including that of Henry III who visited the hamlet in 1229, most probably to engage in hunting in the rural areas. By 1299, Crookham Manor House had a chapel attached to it. On 29 and 30 August 1320, Edward II stayed there.

In 1445 the sub-manor of Chamberhouse was formed. Chamberhouse was the childhood home of the distinguished soldier and statesman Henry Docwra, 1st Baron Docwra of Culmore, who was born there in 1564. Anne of Denmark came to Chamberhouse for dinner with Nicholas Fuller on 4 September 1613. The original Crookham Manor and chapel appear to have been abandoned around 1542, and by about 1748, the estate had been purchased by George Amyand, a merchant and subsequently Member of Parliament for Barnstaple. A new manor house was built in the 18th century and this itself was demolished and rebuilt around 1850, Crookham House, in the mid-20th century, the building served as a junior school for the children of US Air Force personnel stationed at the nearby RAF Greenham Common airbase. Then was occupied by Crookham Court School from 1961 until it was closed down in 1989 after a child sex abuse scandal at the school. The building is known today as Pinchington Hall.
