= George Delves =

16th century English knight & military commander

Sir George Delves (born c. 1545, living 1602) was an English knight, military commander, and member of the Honourable Corps of Gentlemen at Arms in the reign of Queen Elizabeth I.

Between the 1 and 3 May 1571, Delves was one of the defenders in a tournament before the Queen at which one of the challengers was the Earl of Oxford. On 24 June, Delves wrote to the Earl of Rutland "There is no man of life and agility in every respect in the Court but the Earl of Oxford".

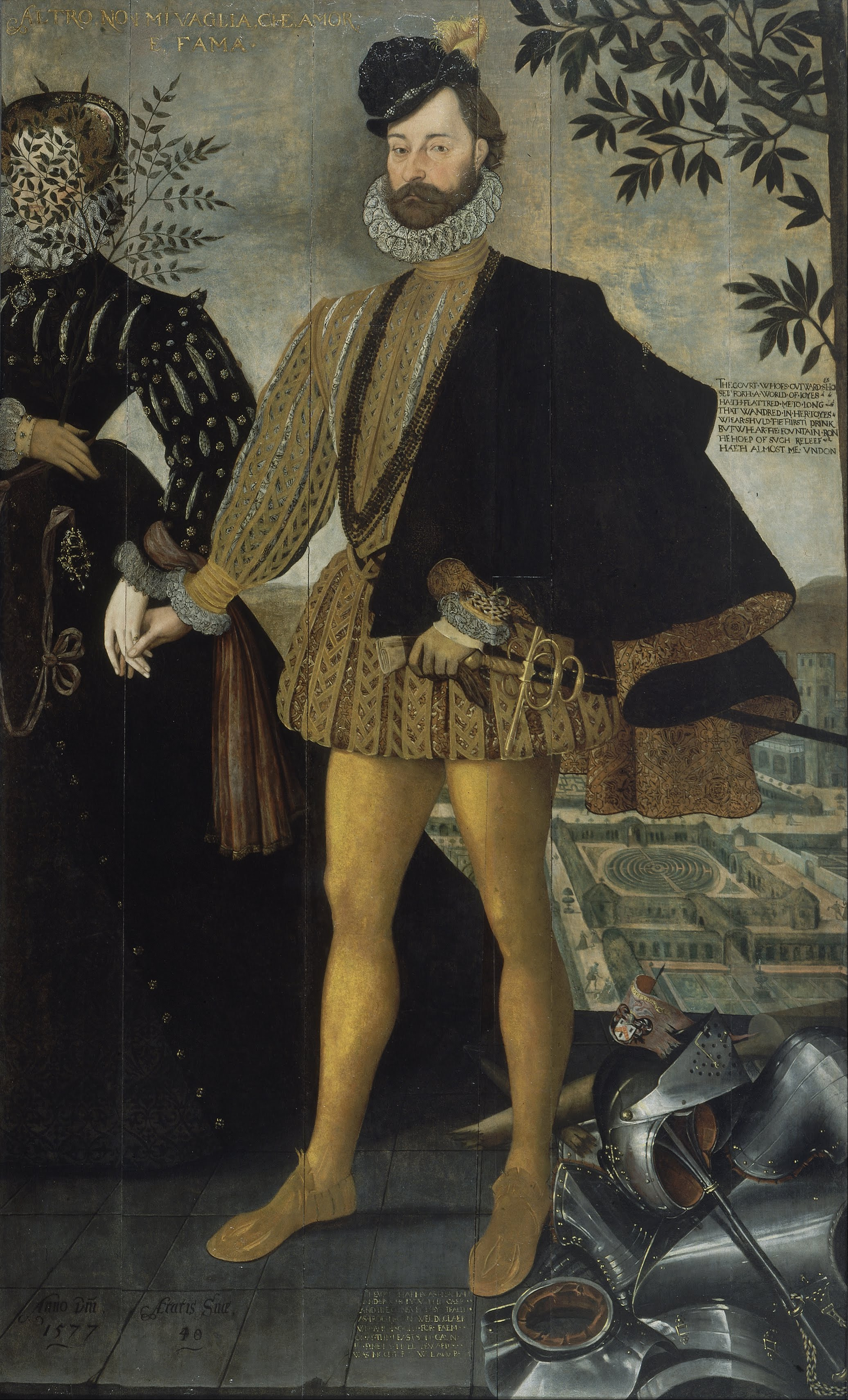
Portrait of George Delves and a Female Companion – English School, 1577

In 1578, Delves and Sir William Fitzwilliam were appointed by letters patent as alnagers and collectors of customs duties on the transport of 'New Draperies', a potentially profitable position which was to be held for seven years. In the event, they held their patent for a great deal longer, the actual work being done by deputies.

Delves married Christian, a daughter of Sir William FitzWilliam, of Northamptonshire, the widow of Sir Richard Wingfield, who had died by June 1559. He thus became the step-father of Christian's sons Richard, later first Viscount Powerscourt, and John Wingfield.

On 8 March 1582 or 1583, Delves married secondly Anne Esley, or Isley, of Westminster. She brought to the marriage an estate at Bredgar, Kent.

He was knighted on 4 April 1591 by FitzWilliam, Lord Deputy of Ireland.

In 1602, he was one of the justices for the Quarter Sessions of Kent held at Maidstone.

== Arms ==
Delves's arms are blazoned: "Argent a chevron gules fretty or between three delves sable.
