= Siege of Tory Island =

Ending battle of O'Doherty's Rebellion (1608)

- Part of O'Doherty's Rebellion
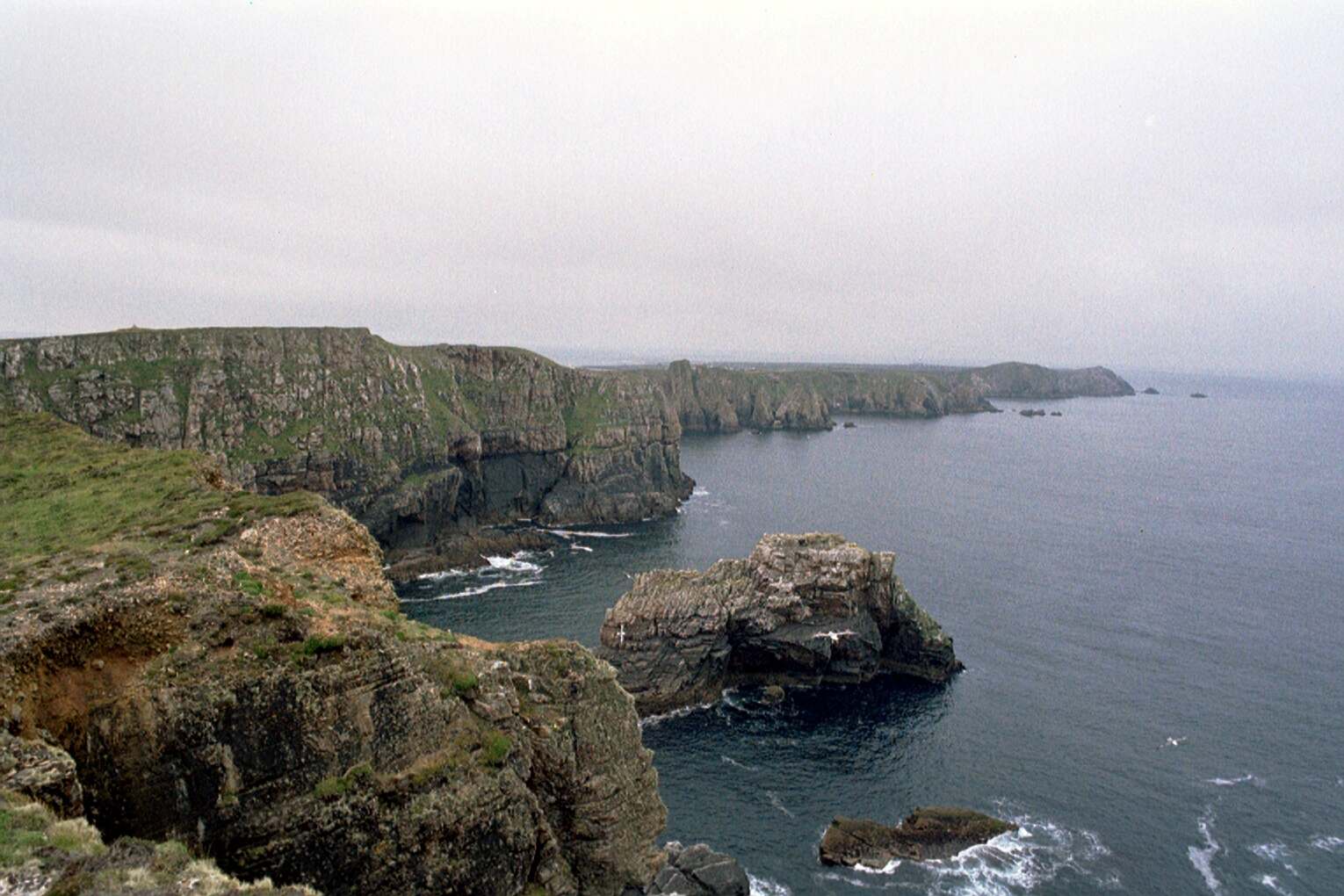
- Tory Island
Date	1608
Location	Tory Island, County Donegal
Result	Crown victory

Belligerents
Kingdom of Ireland	Rebels

Commanders and leaders
Sir Henry Folliott	Sir Mulmory MacSweeney

The siege of Tory Island took place in 1608 during O'Doherty's Rebellion when some of the remaining rebels made a last stand against Crown forces on Tory Island off the northern coast of Ireland. Following their defeat at the Battle of Kilmacrennan, where their leader Sir Cahir O'Doherty had been killed, a group of survivors withdrew to Tory Island, pursued there by Sir Henry Folliott, the Governor of Ballyshannon. The rebels took shelter in the castle on the island but it became obvious they could not hold out for long.

To avail himself of a device known as "Pelham's Pardon", the Constable of the castle, Sir Mulmory McSweeney, began to kill his fellow defenders intending to hand their severed heads over to the enemy. He killed three, before he was stabbed to death and cut to pieces. His own killer was in turn cut down. Some of the survivors of the massacre were then pardoned. Some of the family that were pardoned changed their names. For example, they could have changed it to O'Docharty or even O'Darty. There are over 20 variations that were the results of the pardon.

== Bibliography ==
- Bardon, Jonathan. The Plantation of Ulster. Gill & MacMillan, 2012.
- Connolly, S.J. Contested Island: Ireland 1460-1630. Oxford University Press, 2009.
- Lenihan, Padraig. Consolidating Conquest: Ireland 1603-1727. Routledge, 2014.
- McCavitt, John. The Flight of the Earls. Gill & MacMillan, 2002.
