= Hugh McDaid =

Northern Ireland football club chairman

Hugh McDaid (born in Derry, Northern Ireland) was the chairman of League of Ireland club, Derry City F.C.

Having worked his way up from being a delivery boy for Doherty's Butchers, he is proprietor of a well known bar and restaurant in the north west region of Ireland, known as Badger's Place. The name of the bar stems from a nickname that Hugh was christened with by people who knew him in his mid to late 20s when his hair began to take on a greyish tint.
