= Richard Wingfield (MP for Portsmouth) =

16th-century English politician

Sir Richard Wingfield (c. 1510 – 1557/59), of Portsmouth, Hampshire, was an English politician.

He was a member (MP) of the parliament of England for Portsmouth in March 1553.
