= Jonathan Bardon =

Irish historian and author (1941–2020)

Jonathan Bardon OBE
- Born: 1941; Dublin, Ireland
- Died: 21 April 2020 (aged 78); Belfast, Northern Ireland
- Education: The Queen's University of Belfast
- Occupations: Historian, educator
- Writing career
- Notable work: A History of Ulster

Jonathan Eric Bardon OBE (born in Dublin, 1941 – died in Belfast, 21 April 2020), was an Irish historian and author.

== Early life ==
Bardon was born in Dublin in 1941 and graduated from Trinity College, Dublin (TCD), in 1963. Shortly thereafter, in 1964, he moved to Belfast to begin his teaching career at Orangefield Boys Secondary School. While in Belfast, he enrolled at Queens University, Belfast, where he received a Diploma in Education, also in 1964. Living in Northern Ireland as a young man during the beginning of the Troubles, he credits two things that piqued his fascination with it, while remaining nonpolitical: his early teaching experiences educating young boys, both Catholic and Protestant, in Belfast; and a five feature commission he received from the now-defunct Sunday Times to write about and research the Battle of the Somme.

== Career ==
Bardon is best known for his critically acclaimed text, A History of Ulster. The book examines, in detail, the cultural, social, economic, and political arenas of the province, beginning with the early settlements and progressing linearly to present-day Ulster.

He has also written numerous radio and television programmes on the subject of Northern Ireland. Most recently he was commissioned by BBC Radio to create a two hundred and forty-episode series entitled A Short History of Ireland. The final episode aired on 18 March 2007.

In 2002, Bardon was appointed an OBE for "services to community life".

Bardon died in Belfast on 21 April 2020, at the age of 78, having contracted COVID-19. He already had underlying health issues, including lung cancer.

== Bibliography ==
- A History of Ulster. Blackstaff Press, 1992.
- A History of Ireland in 250 Episodes. 2008.
- Belfast: A Century. Blackstaff Press, 1999.
- Belfast: An Illustrated History. Blackstaff Press, 1982.
- Belfast: 1000 Years. Blackstaff Press, 1985.
- Beyond the Studio: A History of BBC Northern Ireland. Blackstaff Press, 2000.
- Dublin: One Thousand Years of Wood Quay. Blackstaff Press, 1988. (co-authored with Stephen Conlin).
- The Plantation Of Ulster. Gill and Macmillan, 2011.
- Hallelujah - The Story of a Musical Genius and the City That Brought his Masterpiece to Life. Gill and Macmillan, 2015.
- A Narrow Sea: The Irish-Scottish Connection in 120 Episodes. Gill Books, 2018.
