= Anne McKevitt =

Scottish businesswoman

- Born: 28 November 1967 (age 58); Thurso, Caithness, Scotland
- Known for: Interior designer Property developer TV host
- Television: Home Front; This Morning; GMTV; STV
- Website: www.annemckevitt.com

Anne McKevitt (born in 1967, in Caithness, Scotland) is a Scottish entrepreneur, TV personality, author and philanthropist.

== Early years ==
Anne McKevitt was born in 1967 in Caithness, in northern Scotland. She spent her childhood in a poor area, living together with her family in local council housing. She mentioned that she was the first girl in the Highlands refusing to do cookery and sewing lessons in high school, instead doing metal work and technical drawing lessons with a class of boys. She revolted at school against dissecting animals for biology and managed to change the high school policy in this matter. At age 15, Anne left school and went to London, where she started to work as a junior hairstylist.

== Career ==
Anne McKevitt was trained as a hairstylist by John Frieda, creating hair styles for major catwalk shows, pop video shoots, TV commercials, magazine covers and fashion spreads. Within a few years, she became established in the fashion business, considered in the British media of that time as one of the top four hairstylists in the UK.

In 1986, she suffered a serious car accident, which left her unable to walk for 18 months. The event was a turning point in her career, preventing her to return to the fashion world. The recovery was not complete, the effects of some spinal injuries were only ameliorated with alternative treatment provided by Linda and Paul McCartney (two of her former clients).

As part of her recuperation, she spent time revamping her own apartment. When she was asked by other people to help them renovating their houses, this proved to be the inception of a successful business. In 1990, Anne started her first company with finance from her credit card, refurbishing and developing London homes, then a second one for handling interior design of existing properties.

After a year, her property development business had a multimillion-pound turnover, her work resulting also in several design awards, including the Housing Design Award 2000 and Best Home in Scotland.

In 1995, as a result of her success as an interior designer and property developer, Anne was asked to host a new lifestyle TV show. From 1995 until 2000, she appeared for the BBC in 18 series of lifestyle programmes (including Home Front, 1996 - 2000 seasons) that were syndicated in 22 countries. Anne also featured in various other UK TV shows (among them, the ITV programmes and subsidiaries This Morning, GMTV, STV) and later appeared on several US networks. She also appeared as a guest on TV shows in Australia, Canada, Ireland, New Zealand, Sweden, Hong Kong, Japan, South Africa, UK, United States and Zimbabwe.

In the years 1997 - 2002, Anne wrote five interior design books that sold in 16 countries. The first of them (Style on a Shoestring) sold one million copies and was the twentieth best selling UK book in the 1990s. Interviews and feature articles appeared in numerous magazines and newspapers.

In 1997 she launched her line of home products, branded Anne McKevitt Ideas, its items being sold in the UK retail outlets, including Homebase, B&Q, Debenhams, John Lewis, Freemans and Home Shopping Network.

In Spring 2001, Anne McKevitt announced that her line of home products would also be launched in the United States. In August, the same year, she was named by Time magazine as one of "Four International Business Leaders to Watch".

At a later date, Anne McKevitt immigrated to Australia, living in Sydney.

Besides her brand of home products, Anne became also known as an adviser on lifestyle changes and competitiveness, counselling global businesses, including Mercedes-Benz, Walmart, Toyota and Hewlett-Packard. She is a motivational speaker, covering topics such as leadership, innovation, trends and competitiveness. She also gives keynote presentations and runs workshops on a variety of business subjects.

Anne McKevitt is involved in humanitarian and educational projects, working with organizations such as Clinton Global Initiative and Opportunity International Australia. She is a member of Humanists UK, PETA and the Australian and British Vegetarian Societies.

== Personal life ==
Anne is a ethical vegan and she is known as an expert on vegan cuisine. Her interests include animal compassion, environmental issues, poverty reduction, neuroscience and space science.

She practised sports from an early age and won awards for gymnastics as a teen. After the 1986 accident, although she was told that she would never be able to walk again, she managed to recover, remaining however with a chronic back pain. She continued an active life, with daily yoga exercises, swimming and walking.

She also did Mal Chandé's house on Home Front.

== Books ==
- 1997 McKevitt, Anne: Style on a Shoestring, Quadrille Publishing Ltd, London. ISBN 1-902757-37-8
- 1998 McKevitt, Anne: Home Front Kitchens, BBC Worldwide Publishing, London. ISBN 0-563-38391-7
- 1998 McKevitt, Anne: House Sensation, Quadrille Publishing Ltd, London. ISBN 1899988432
- 2000 McKevitt, Anne: Designer Know How by BBC Worldwide Ltd, London. ISBN 0-563-55164-X
- 2002 McKevitt, Anne: Style Solutions, Clarkson Potter-Random House Publishers, New York. ISBN 1-4000-4610-6

== Awards ==
- "Leading Women Entrepreneur of the World" 2002-2003
- Time's one of "Four International Business Leaders To Watch"
- "World Class Entrepreneur" (The International Herald Tribune)
- Number 30 in The Sunday Times "500 Most Powerful Britons"
- "Best Home in Scotland" ("UK National Home Builder design" award sponsored by The Guardian newspaper)
- "Best Home for the Future in the UK" ("UK National Home Builder design" award sponsored by The Guardian newspaper)
- "Best Interior Layout" ("What House" award sponsored by The Sunday Times newspaper)
- "Civic Trust Award" 2001 (Saltire Society)
- "Housing Design Award" 2000 (Royal Incorporation of Architects in Scotland)
- "Regeneration Achievement Award" 2000 (Supreme Award, Chartered Institute of Building, Scotland)
- "Good Building Award" 2000 (Royal Town Planning Institute award for Planning Achievement)
