= O'Doherty's rebellion =

Failed rebellion in 1608 in Ulster, Ireland

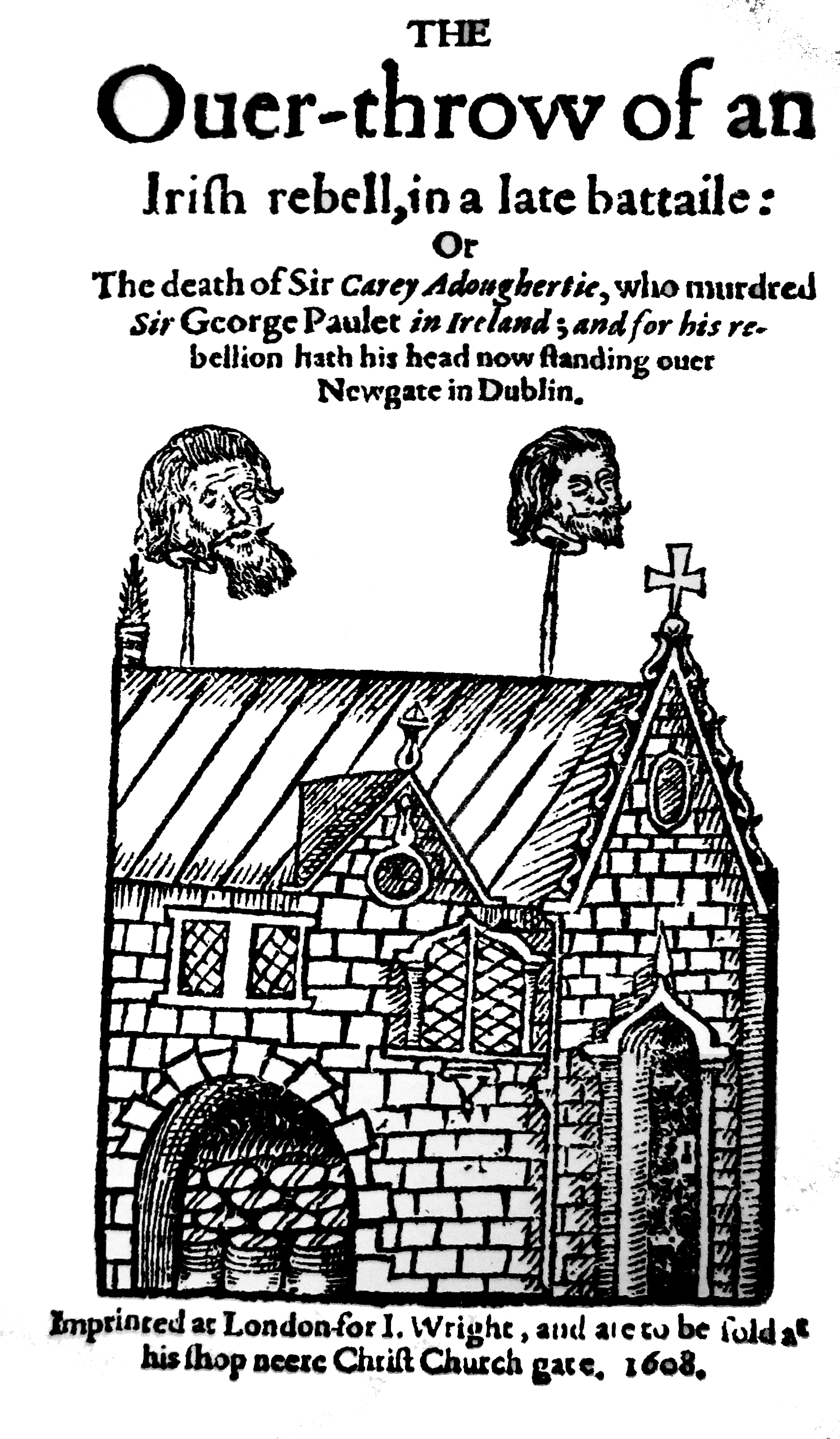
- The severed heads of MacDavitt and O'Doherty on display on the Newgate, Dublin, beheading being a common punishment for treason.
Date	1608
Location	County Donegal, Ulster, Ireland
Result	Revolt suppressed

Belligerents
Kingdom of Ireland	O'Doherty's rebels

Commanders and leaders
(Kingdom of Ireland) James I (Kingdom of Ireland) Sir Arthur Chichester (Kingdom of Ireland) Sir Richard Wingfield	Sir Cahir O'Doherty †; Phelim MacDavitt †

O'Doherty's Rebellion, also called O'Dogherty's Revolt, was an uprising against the Crown authorities in western Ulster, Ireland. Sir Cahir O'Doherty, lord of Inishowen, a Gaelic chieftain, had been a supporter of the Crown during the Nine Years' War (1593–1603), but angered at his treatment by Sir George Paulet, governor of Derry, he attacked and burned Derry in April 1608. O'Doherty was defeated and killed in the Battle of Kilmacrennan in July. The rebellion ended with the surrender of the last die-hards at the Siege of Tory Island later in the same year.

== Background ==
O'Doherty also called O'Dogherty ruled the Inishowen peninsula in northern County Donegal in the northwest of Ulster, the northern province of Ireland. The Gaelic O'Dohertys had traditionally accepted the overlordship of the O'Donnells, but had ambitions to become freeholders under the English Crown instead. In 1600, at the age of 15, Cahir joined the forces of the English Governor of Derry, Sir Henry Docwra, who were fighting to defeat Tyrone's Rebellion. With the help of O'Doherty and other Gaelic lords, Docwra advanced from Derry into the heart of Gaelic territory. Docwra praised his courage under fire, and recommended him for a knighthood.

The two principal leaders of the northern rebellion, The 2nd Earl of Tyrone and The 1st Earl of Tyrconnell, were restored to their lands by the Treaty of Mellifont in 1603, after publicly submitting to the new King James VI and I. However, the English still suspected them of being involved in fresh plots. Summoned to London in 1607, they instead sailed for the Continent with a group of their followers, in the Flight of the Earls.

By this time, the sympathetic Docwra had been replaced by Sir George Paulet, who took a much harder view of the Gaelic lords, even loyalists like O'Doherty. Docwra had resigned his command because he felt that English veterans of the war and their Irish allies had been poorly rewarded in the peace settlement after the war, as the land promised to them had been returned to Lords Tyrone and Tyrconnell. O'Doherty had not suffered as badly as others, losing only Inch Island.

=== Canmoyre Woods incident ===
Tensions were high following the Flight of the Earls and the English were concerned that there might be a wider conspiracy amongst the Gaelic lords of the north. This was based partly on the evidence of Lord Howth who had claimed that there was a major plot. Paulet, governor of Derry, overreacted to reports that O'Doherty and a number of his followers were assembling for a planned revolt and marched out with troops. O'Doherty was in fact taking part in a wood-cutting expedition to the Canmoyre Woods near his home, rather than assembling a rebellion as Paulet had been led to believe.

O'Doherty travelled to Dublin to plead his case before Sir Arthur Chichester, Lord Deputy of Ireland. Unfortunately, his arrival coincided with the escape from Dublin Castle of Lord Delvin, leader of a planned revolt. O'Doherty demanded that his innocence be publicly declared. Instead, Lord Deputy Chichester ordered that O'Doherty put up a huge surety bond of more than £1,000, its repayment conditional on his future behaviour, and banned him from leaving Ireland – forbidding him to go to London to lobby King James. No evidence was provided of his involvement in any plot, but the incident severely damaged O'Doherty's relations with the government.

=== Plot ===
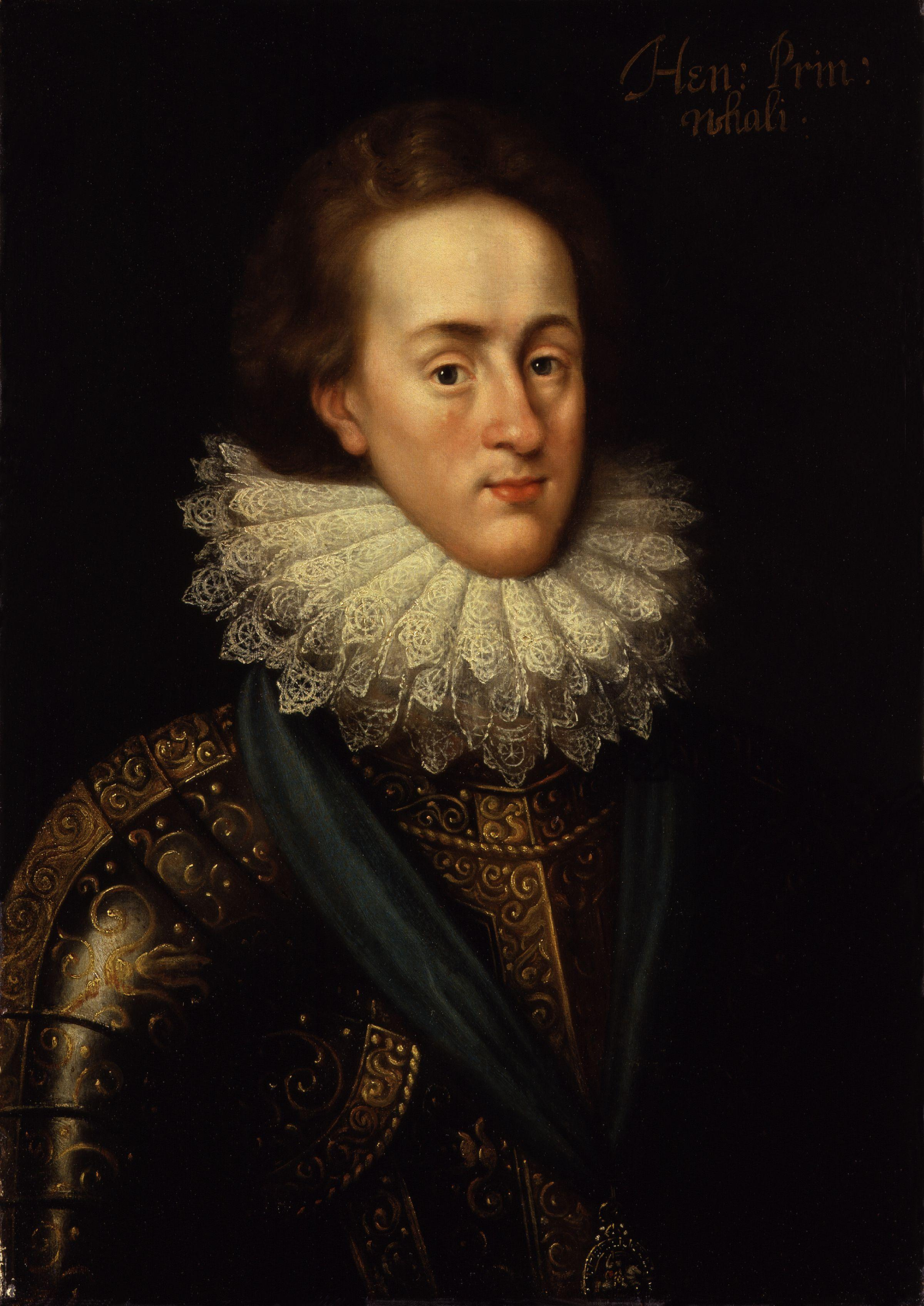
Henry, Prince of Wales, into whose entourage O'Doherty sought to be placed

Despite his difficulties, O'Doherty persisted in his allegiance to the Crown once he returned to County Donegal. In January 1608, Sir Cahir, as he was now, sat on the Irish jury that confirmed the Act of Attainder against the absent Earl of Tyrconnell, stripping him of his lands and title for treason. He also pursued his links at Court, through contacts such as the well-connected Sir Randal MacDonnell. O'Doherty sought to become a courtier by gaining a place in the household of Henry, Prince of Wales.

The main cause of O'Doherty's move towards rebellion was the insults he suffered from Governor Paulet. While he was in Derry on business, Paulet struck him in the face. O'Doherty now began to suspect that he could not hope for fair treatment from English justice, and armed force was his only possible tactic. He was encouraged by one of his neighbours, Sir Niall Garve O'Donnell, who was possibly duplicitous and hoped to be awarded O'Doherty's lands in the event of a failed rebellion. Even at this point, O'Doherty remained reluctant to rebel and with "tears in his eyes" he approached English officers asking them how he could regain the Lord Deputy's favour. He even turned over one of his relations, Phelim MacDavitt, a wanted man, to the authorities – a sign of the extreme demands being made on him. O'Doherty's lobbying on behalf of MacDavitt led to his release just in time to take part in the rebellion.

O'Doherty now rose in revolt, choosing to "play the enemy" that the authorities "would not admit for a friend". The night before the rising, O'Doherty dined with his friend Captain Henry Hart, the constable of Culmore Fort, near Derry. O'Doherty explained his reasons for rebellion and asked Hart to hand Culmore over to him. Hart refused, even when threatened with death. To save her husband's life, Hart's wife agreed to help betray Culmore. She lured the garrison out of the fort, making them fall into an ambush by O'Doherty's men.

The rebellion was poorly prepared. Ironically, unknown to O'Doherty, the very day he began his rising instructions were sent from London to Chichester asking him to grant O'Doherty's demands, especially returning Inch Island to him.

== Rebellion ==
=== Derry ===
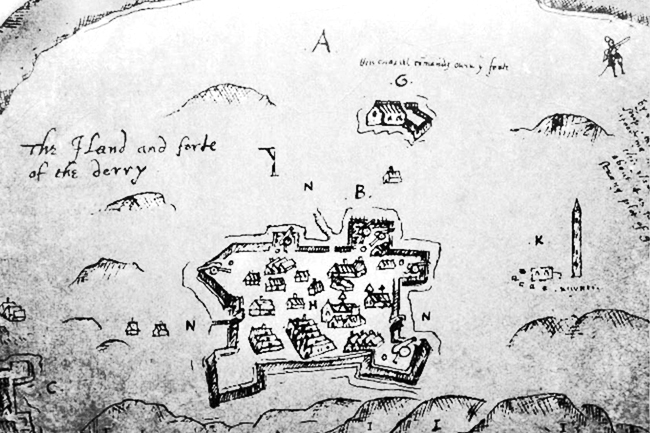
Derry around the time of O'Doherty's attack was described as an "infant city".

Having armed his supporters with weapons taken at Culmore, at 2:00 am on 19 April 1608 O'Doherty led around 100 men on a surprise attack on Derry. Casualties on both sides during the initial assault were light. O'Doherty was able to take the lower fort without firing a shot, as the guards were asleep. Phelim MacDavitt met resistance in the upper fort but overcame it by force of numbers.

The insurgents hunted down the officials who had angered them. Phelim MacDavitt killed Paulet in battle, a sheriff named Hamilton was killed. The rest of the garrison and inhabitants surrendered. Declaring that he was not there to spill blood, O'Doherty let a number of English prisoners go but kept some important hostages. Every house in the settlement was then burned, including public buildings.

=== Spread of the rebellion ===
Paulet was largely blamed for the rising, both for his behaviour towards the local Gaelic population, and for neglecting basic security precautions in Derry. However, Chichester later admitted his part of the responsibility for his bad treatment of O'Doherty after the Canmoyre Woods incident, observing that "all men believed that he had been wronged". The English military in Ireland had few troops ready to respond to the outbreak of violence, but Chichester mustered the male inhabitants of Dublin and surroundings and sent what forces he could northwards immediately. He also arranged the raising of hundreds of Gaelic fighters in Ulster.

Their success at Derry gained support for the rebels. O'Doherty captured Doe Castle, the Scottish inhabitants of Strabane fled for safety, and Coleraine was under threat. Sir Henry Og O'Neill, a Gaelic leader allied with the Crown, and his son Turlough McHenry O'Neill were killed and his town of Kinard was burned. O'Doherty's rising attracted around 1,000 supporters, including the O'Hanlons, who rose near Newry. O'Doherty's forces avoided the estates of the exiled Earl of Tyrone, sparing Dungannon.

It still remained a distinct prospect that the revolt would lead to the Crown offering a favourable settlement to O'Doherty rather than face an expensive war, a common occurrence in Ireland during previous centuries. But some of his gathering supporters believed the Earl of Tyrone was about to return with Spanish help, possibly as a first stage to restoring Catholicism in England and Scotland as well as Ireland. To encourage such supporters O'Doherty proclaimed that everything he did was "in zeal for the Catholic cause". There was also the possibility that Tyrone would use the threat of his return to pressure for a reconciliation with the Crown and be restored to his title and lands.

Chichester offered to step down from his post once the rebellion was put down, and King James was said to have been "persuaded that the mistaken conduct of the present Viceroy has much to do with these events". In the meantime Chichester despatched 700 troops under Sir Richard Wingfield, encouraging them to launch a "thick and short" campaign in Ulster. In response, some of O'Doherty's forces even advanced towards the edge of The Pale.

Wingfield's forces overran O'Doherty's own territory in Inishowen, capturing the town of Buncrana and recovering the ruined remains of Derry. They took O'Doherty's residence at Burt Castle, capturing his wife and son and freeing the prisoners taken at Derry, who were held there. The loss of his own castle badly damaged the morale of O'Doherty's supporters, who pressured him into seeking a direct confrontation with Wingfield's army and threatened to leave him if he did not.

=== Kilmacrennan ===
Gathering his forces, Sir Cahir marched with 1,000 men and met the Crown's troops in July 1608 at Kilmacrennan near Letterkenny in County Donegal, on ground selected by O'Doherty that made it difficult for the enemy's cavalry to deploy. While some accounts suggest the battle was an epic one, it was most likely closer to a skirmish that lasted for around half an hour. During the fighting, O'Doherty was struck in the head by a musket shot and killed. The loss of their leader led to the collapse of the rebel forces, who were pursued by Wingfield's troops and their Gaelic allies. O'Doherty's head was taken by an English infantryman, who claimed the £500 reward for it.

With O'Doherty dead, the rebellion began to fall apart. A number of those taken prisoner were tried for treason in Lifford in civil courts and executed. The most prized prisoner taken was Phelim MacDavitt, who was wounded in woodlands and forced to surrender. He was executed and his head put on display alongside O'Doherty's at Newgate, Dublin. The speed with which Chichester had responded to the rebellion now brought him praise from London.

=== Tory Island ===
Sporadic resistance continued across Ulster, but the defeat at Kilmacrennan led to the disintegration of the rebel forces. A group led by Shane MacManus O'Donnell withdrew to Tory Island off the Donegal coast and occupied a castle. The Governor of Ballyshannon, Sir Henry Folliott, surrounded the castle.

To receive "Pelham's Pardon", the commander of the castle, Sir Mulmory McSweeney, began to kill his fellow defenders to present their heads to the besiegers. After killing several, he was hacked down by his own men who then began killing each other. Those who remained after the infighting were pardoned. Historian Pádraig Lenihan claimed that "It was a fitting epilogue to the disunity and duplicity of Gaelic Ireland".

== Aftermath ==
Following the Flight of the Earls in 1607, Lord Tyrone and Lord Tyrconnell had been attainted for treason and their lands confiscated. It was proposed to settle English and Scottish inhabitants on these lands in a manner similar to the earlier Munster Plantation. Chichester had originally planned a much smaller group of settlements such as Derry, combined with the long-standing policy of Anglicisation of the Gaelic lords. The King and his advisers now implemented a much more ambitious scheme that led to the "plantation" with "undertakers" across six of the nine Ulster counties. The Ulster Plantation's progress was slow at first, partly due to a widespread belief that the government would still reverse its policy and make a deal to restore the Earl of Tyrone and other exiles to their lands, an uncertainty that only went away when Tyrone died in Rome in 1616.

English government attitudes toward the Irish hardened significantly in the wake of the rebellion; it was quickly crushed, but it badly frightened the government who now had a reason to change their minds on how to execute the planned plantations in Ulster. Until this, it was intended to include the so-called "loyal Irish" in the plantation scheme.

Although a number of "deserving Irish" were awarded estates, these were much smaller than had been expected. The Plantation was intended to break up the traditional Gaelic model of a handful of great lords such as Tyrone, replacing them with smaller landowners whose primary loyalty was to the Crown. Among those who benefited from the post-rebellion settlement was Chichester, who was granted much of O'Doherty's former lands in Inishowen. Veteran British and Anglo-Irish officers of the 1594–1603 and 1608 rebellions were granted significant estates, with many going on to found landed dynasties.

== Notes and references ==
=== Sources ===
- Bagwell, Richard (1895). "Paulet, Sir George (d.1608)". In Lee, Sidney (ed.). Dictionary of National Biography. Vol. XLIV. New York: MacMillan and Co. pp. 86–87. OCLC 1043016801.
- Bagwell, Richard (1909). Ireland under the Stuarts and under the Interregnum. Vol. I. London: Longmans, Green, and Co. OCLC 458582656. – 1603 to 1642
- Bardon, Jonathan (2001) [1992]. A History of Ulster (new updated ed.). Belfast: Blackstaff Press. ISBN 0-85640-703-8.
- Bardon, Jonathan (2011). The Plantation of Ulster: War and Conflict in Ireland. Dublin: Gill & MacMillan. ISBN 978-0-7171-5447-0. – (Preview, no page numbers)
- Casway, Jerrold (1984). Owen Roe O'Neill and the Struggle for Catholic Ireland. Philadelphia: University of Pennsylvania. ISBN 0-8122-7895-X.
- Clarke, Aidan; Edwards, Robert Dudley (1976). "Chapter VII: Pacification, Plantation, and the Catholic Question". In Moody, Theodore William; Martin, F. X.; Byrne, Francis John (eds.). A New History of Ireland. Vol. III. Oxford: Oxford University Press. pp. 187–232. ISBN 978-0-19-820242-4. – 1603–1623
- Gillespie, Raymond (2006). Seventeenth-Century Ireland: Making Ireland Modern. Dublin: Gill & MacMillan. ISBN 978-0-7171-3946-0.
- Lenihan, Pádraig (2008). Consolidating Conquest: Ireland 1603–1727. London: Routledge. ISBN 978-0-582-77217-5. – (Preview)
- McCavitt, John (2002). The Flight of the Earls. Dublin: Gill & MacMillan. ISBN 978-0-7171-3047-4. – (Snippet view)
- McCavitt, John (2004). "Chichester, Arthur, Baron Chichester (1563–1625)". In Matthew, Henry Colin Gray; Harrison, Brian (eds.). Oxford Dictionary of National Biography. Vol. 11. New York: Oxford University Press. pp. 397–401. ISBN 0-19-861361-X.
- Shaw, William A. (1906). The Knights of England. Vol. II. London: Sherratt & Hughes. – Knights bachelors & Index
