= Kilmacrennan =

Village in County Donegal, Ireland

Kilmacrennan Cill Mhic Réanáin
- Village
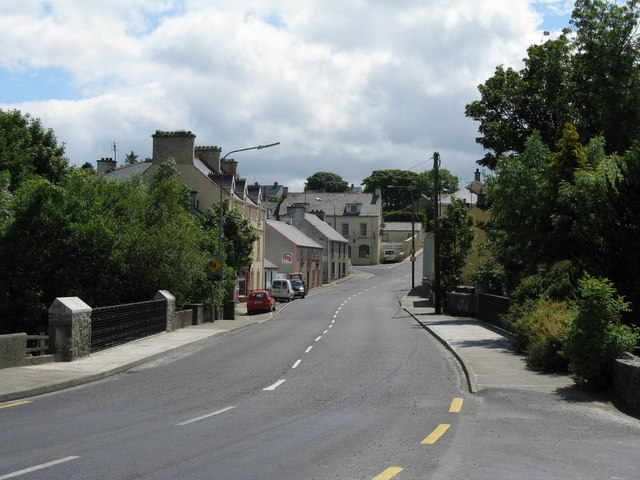
- The village is on the N56 road

- Location in Ireland
- Coordinates: 55°01′47″N 7°46′43″W
- Country: Ireland
- Province: Ulster
- County: County Donegal

Government
  - Dáil Éireann: Donegal

Population (2022)
  - Total: 888
- Time zone: UTC+0 (WET)
  - Summer (DST): UTC+1 (IST (WEST))
- Irish Grid Reference: C166178

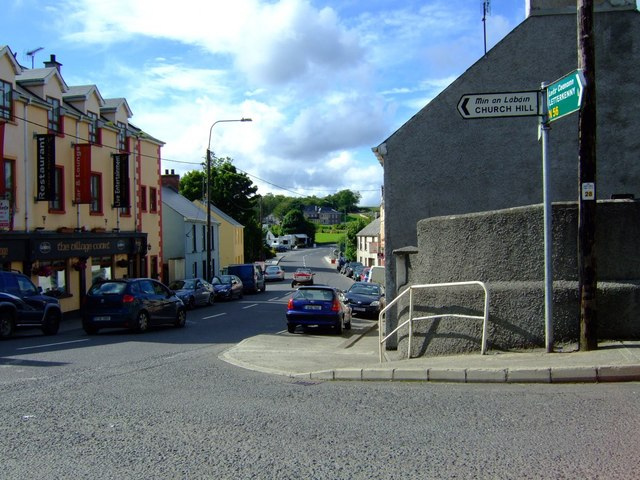
The crossroads on Main Street

Kilmacrennan (Irish: Cill Mhic nÉanáin or Cill Mhic Réanáin), also Kilmacrenan, is a village, townland and civil parish in County Donegal, Ireland. The village population was 888, as of the 2022 census. The village's population has increased steadily over the last decade with many new housing developments catering, in particular, for an overspill population from Letterkenny. Kilmacrennan was historically the caput of its eponymous Barony of Kilmacrennan, of the eight Baronies of Donegal.

The Battle of Kilmacrennan was fought near the village in 1608 during O'Doherty's Rebellion.

== Geography ==
Kilmacrennan lies on the N56 road, 9 km northwest of Letterkenny which is the largest town in County Donegal. The village's name 'Cill Mhic nÉanáin' means 'the church of the sons of Éanán'.

Two rivers flow through the village, the Lennon and the Lurgy. Traditionally, the river Lennon was renowned for salmon fishing; however, the salmon numbers have dropped dramatically in recent years. Most anglers blame pollution for this. The salmon and trout population is slowly increasing but will take a number of years for it to reach its old level.

== Amenities ==
A 1916 Remembrance Garden was opened to the public in 2016 to mark the centenary of the Easter Rising. There are three churches: a Catholic church and the Church of St Finian and St Mark Church of Ireland in the village itself, as well as a Presbyterian Church in the townland of Leiter about 3 km away. Kilmacrennan national school is also located beside the Catholic church. It has approximately 240 pupils. It opened in 2008. The previous national school, which opened in 1935, is across the road.

== Industry ==
Kytun is a local manufacturer; they produce aluminium roofing and ventilation products, and are notable for their large range of both aluminium & pvc roofline trims.

== Sport ==
Kilmacrennan has a soccer club called Kilmacrennan Celtic, founded in 1977 and formerly known as Lurgy Celtic. They have a senior and reserve team in the Donegal League and also have underage teams from u-8 level to u-18 level.

== Notable people ==
- Arthur Kenney, Dean of Achonry 1812–1821
- Michael Logue, Archbishop of Armagh 1887–1924
- Bernard McGlinchey, senator and businessman
- Cahir O'Doherty was killed near here, was decapitated and his head was put on public display
- John O'Donnell, businessman and politician

== See also ==
- List of populated places in Ireland
- List of abbeys and priories in the Republic of Ireland (County Donegal)
- Kilmacrennan railway station
