= Battle of Kilmacrennan =

1608 skirmish during O'Doherty's Rebellion

- Part of O'Doherty's Rebellion
Date	5 July 1608
Location	Kilmacrennan, Ireland
Result	Crown victory

Belligerents
Kingdom of Ireland	Rebels

Commanders and leaders
Sir Richard Wingfield	Cahir O'Doherty †

Strength
Unknown	1,000

The Battle of Kilmacrennan was a skirmish fought near Kilmacrennan, County Donegal in 1608 during O'Doherty's Rebellion. Sir Cahir O'Doherty was a traditional supporter of the Crown whose treatment at the hands of local officials had led him to launch a rebellion in which he had seized the garrison town of Derry, killing his enemy George Paulet. O'Doherty raised local forces and possibly hoped to negotiate an agreement with the government as had been common with leaders of previous rebellions.

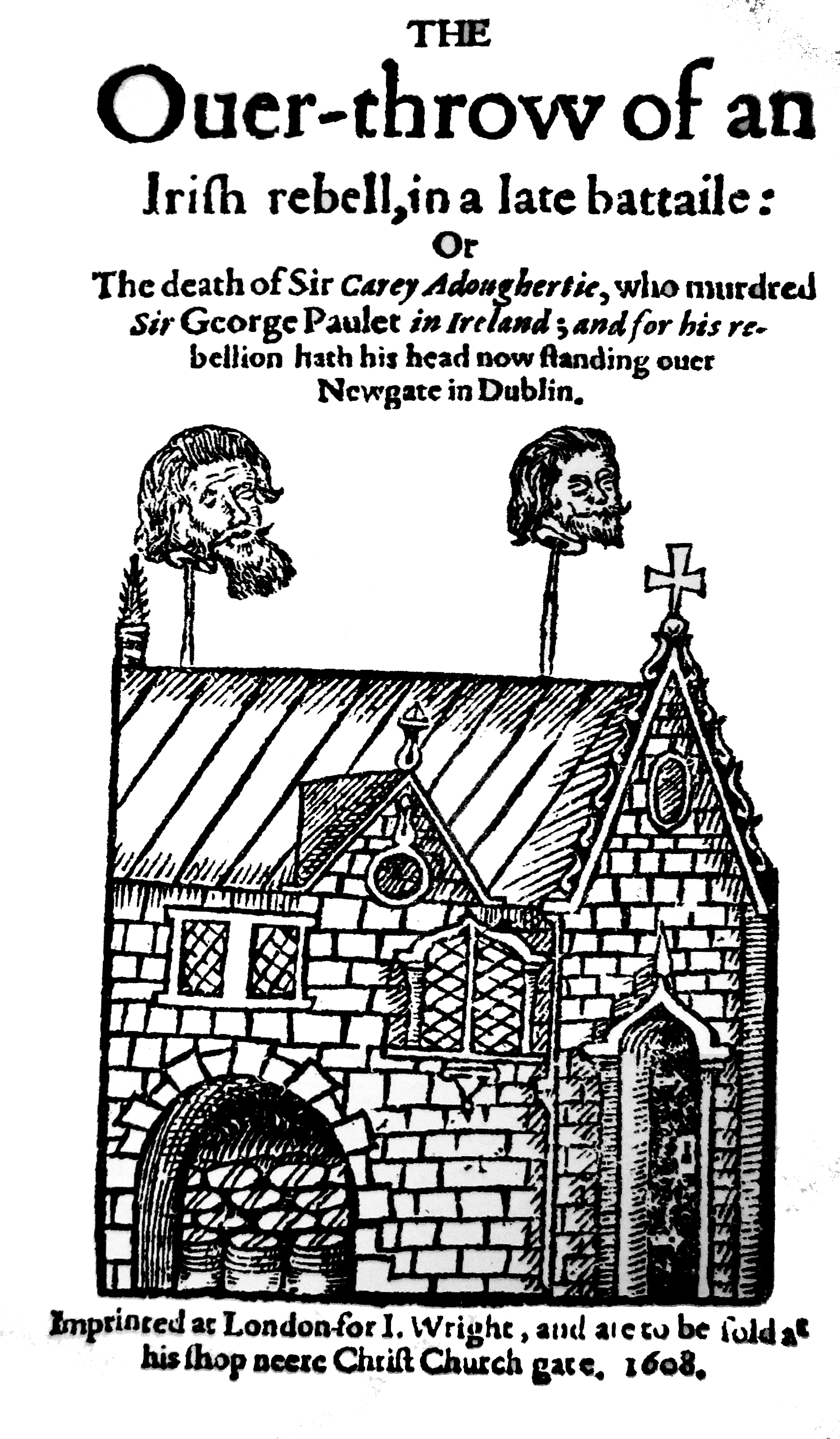
Newgate, Dublin. 1608. Displaying the heads of Irish rebels Cahir O'Doherty (right) and his foster father Phelim Reagh MacDavitt (left).

However, the Viceroy in Dublin, Arthur Chichester, responded quickly and despatched reinforcements to the area under Richard Wingfield. They were a mixture of professional soldiers of the Royal Irish Army and Gaelic warriors allied to the government. They met the rebels at Kilmacrennan and O'Doherty was killed by a musket shot to the head. His troops' morale collapsed and they fled the field. A £500 bounty had been placed on O'Doherty and, while a number of outlandish legends exist about the fate of his severed head, a reward was given to an infantry soldier John Trendor by the Dublin government. With O'Doherty's death, the rebellion quickly collapsed, the final forces retreating to Tory Island, where they were successfully besieged.

== Bibliography ==
- McCavitt, John. The Flight of the Earls. Gill & MacMillan, 2002.
