= Henry Docwra, 1st Baron Docwra of Culmore =

English-born soldier and statesman (1564–1631)

The 1st Baron Docwra of Culmore
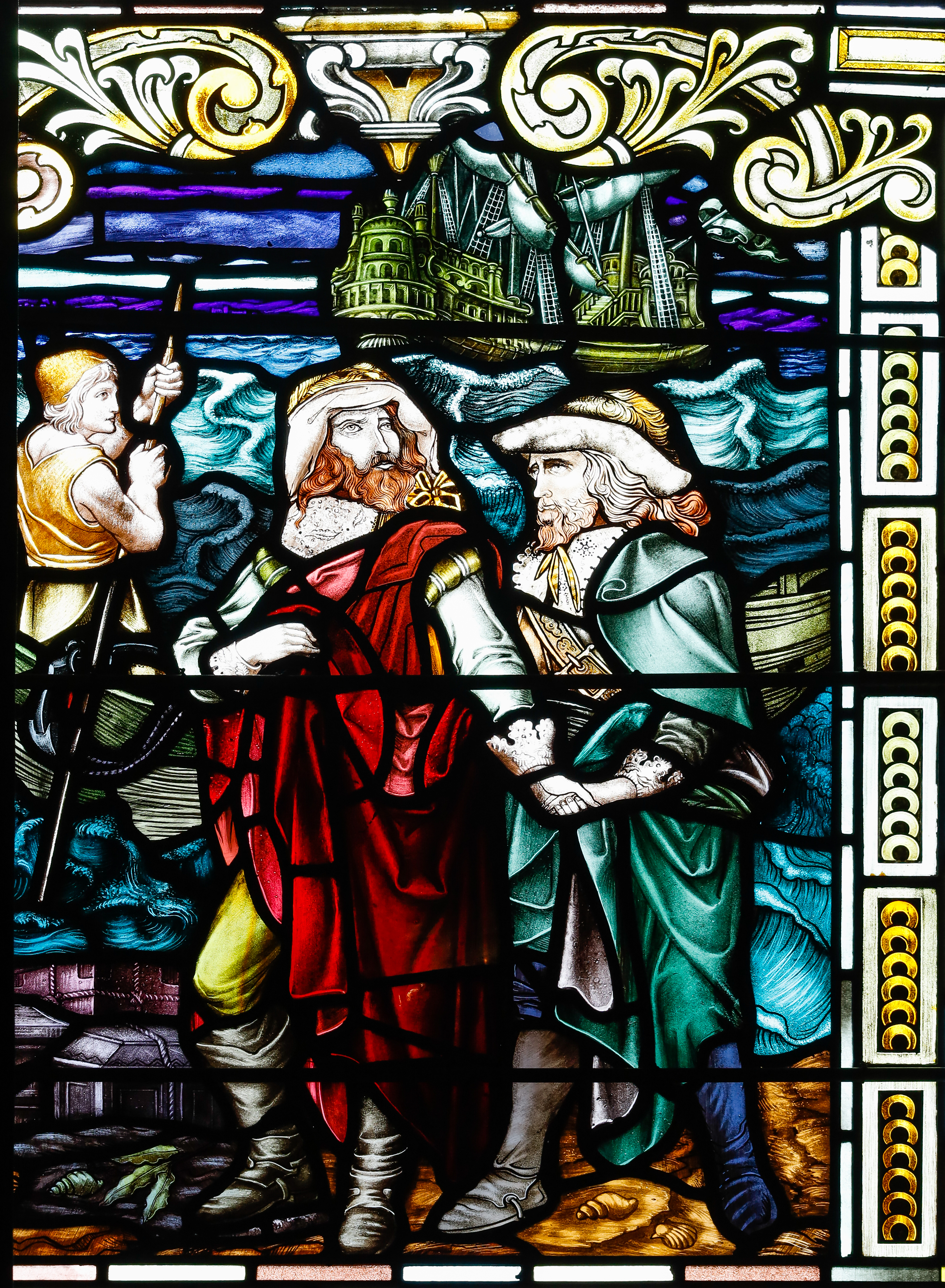
- Detail of a stained glass window in the Guildhall in Derry, depicting the landing of Sir Henry Docwra at Culmore in April 1600
- Born: 1564; Crookham, Berkshire, England
- Died: 18 April 1631 (aged 66-67); Dublin, Ireland
- Burial place: Christ Church Cathedral, Dublin
- Spouse: Anne Vaughan
- Military career
- Nickname: The founder of Derry

Henry Docwra, 1st Baron Docwra of Culmore (1564 – 18 April 1631), was a leading English-born soldier and statesman in early seventeenth-century Ireland. He is often called "the founder of Derry", due to his role in establishing the city.

== Background ==
Henry Docwra was born at Chamberhouse Castle, Crookham, near Thatcham, Berkshire, into a minor gentry family, the Docwras (there are several variant spellings of the name, including Dockwra and Dowkra), who came originally from Yorkshire. Docwra was baptised on 30 April 1564.

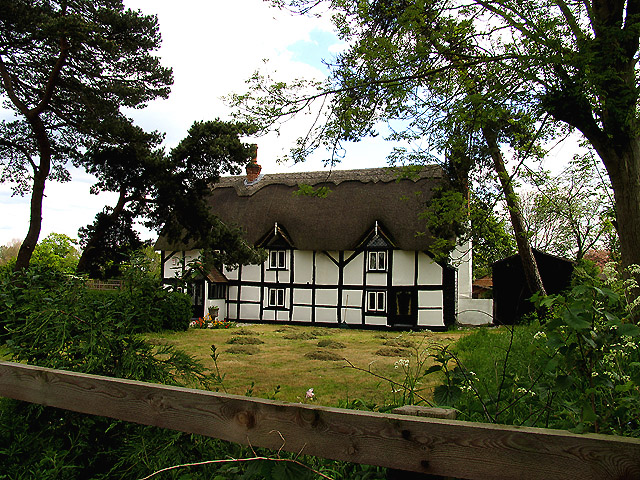
Crookham, Berkshire, Henry's birthplace

He was (as far as is known) the only surviving son of Edmund Docwra MP and his wife Dorothy Golding, daughter of John Golding of Halstead, Essex, and sister of the noted translator Arthur Golding. His father was a prominent local politician, who sat in the House of Commons as MP for Aylesbury in the Parliament of 1571, and for New Windsor in that of 1572. He was later obliged by financial difficulties to sell Chamberhouse. The family's money troubles may be the reason why his son pursued a military career.

The Docwras seem to have lacked influential relatives, and this was to be a considerable difficulty to Henry throughout his career, in an age when family connections were of great importance. Henry did inherit some lands in Berkshire, which he sold around 1615 to finance his hoped-for return to Ireland and to public office.

== Military career ==
After serving for some years as a professional soldier in the Netherlands and France, Docwra, who was still only in his early twenties, was sent by the English Crown to Ireland in about 1584. He was made the constable of Dungarvan Castle, and served under Sir Richard Bingham, the governor of Connaught, in 1586. Bingham besieged Annis Castle near Ballinrobe, and used Ballinrobe as a base from which to attempt to pacify County Mayo. He was unable to subdue the Burke clan, the dominant political force in Mayo, and the campaign ended inconclusively.

=== Service with Essex and Vere ===
Docwra left Ireland around 1590. Like many ambitious young courtiers of the time, he entered the service of the Earl of Essex, the royal favourite, and fought beside him in the war against Spain. He took part in the Siege of Rouen in 1591-2, and in the Capture of Cádiz in 1596 where he was knighted by Essex in person for his "acts of valour". The following year he saw military service under Sir Francis Vere in Maurice of Nassau's campaigns in Brabant, and spent much of the late 1590s in the Netherlands where he distinguished himself at the Battle of Turnhout. He did not take part in Essex's ill-fated Islands Voyage expedition to the Azores in 1597.

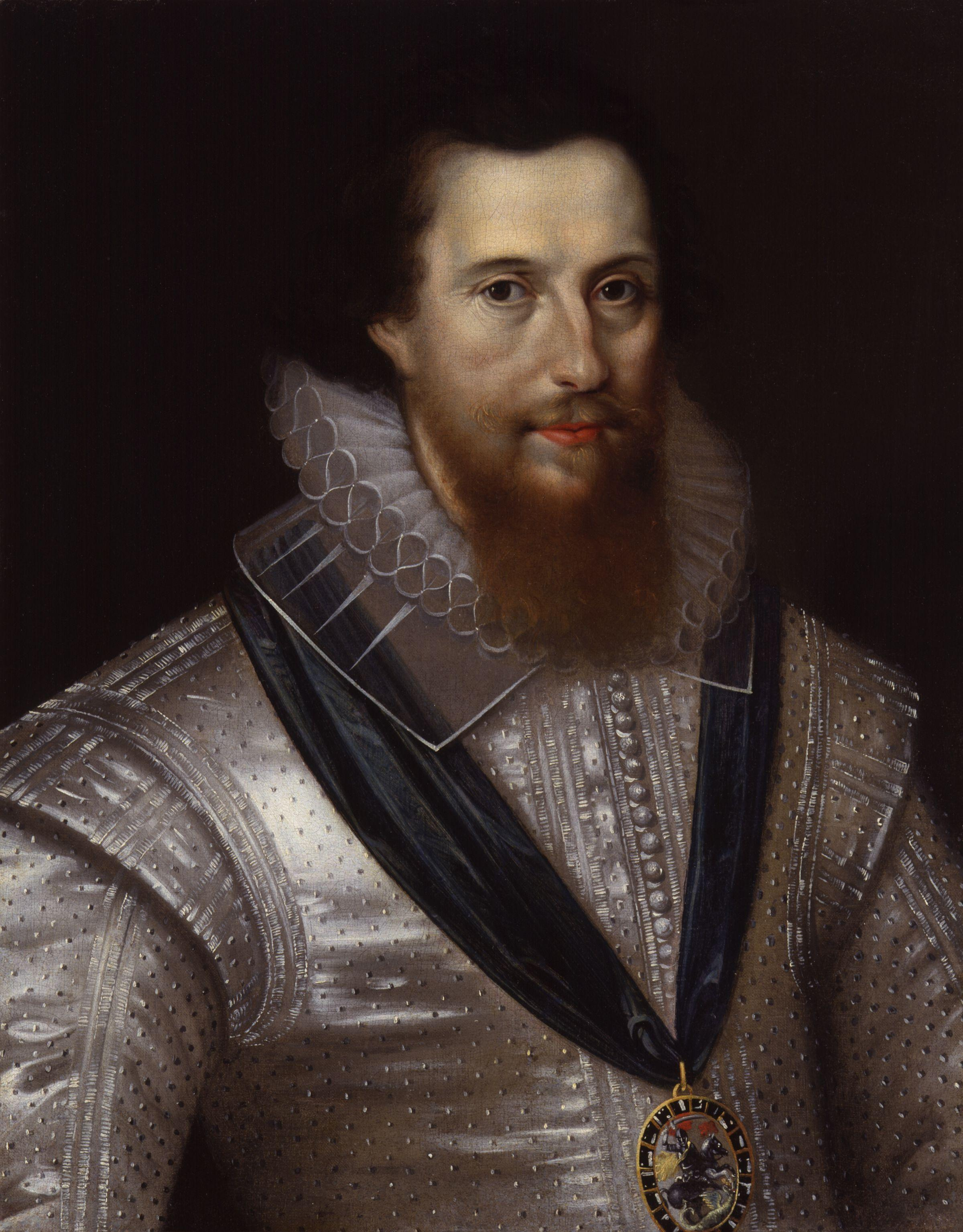
Robert Devereux, 2nd Earl of Essex

=== Return to Ireland ===
In 1599, to his "unspeakable contentment", he was sent back to Ireland to serve with Essex during the Nine Years War, acting as his chief adviser on Irish military affairs. During Essex's disastrous attempts to pacify Ireland, Docwra was mainly occupied with attempting to subdue the O'Byrne clan in County Wicklow. He took no part in Essex's controversial negotiations with Hugh O'Neill, who was the overall Irish leader during the Nine Years' War. These negotiations produced a set of terms called the Cessation, which was attacked by Essex's enemies as a total English capitulation to the Irish. The Queen's reaction was to tell Essex sharply that if she had wanted to abandon Ireland altogether, it would hardly have been necessary to send him there. Docwra had returned to England with Essex in the autumn of 1599. In 1600 he was sent back to Ireland as commander of an army of 4000 men and captured the ruined site of Derry in May 1600. Fighting continued until 1603.

The Cessation led quickly to Essex's disgrace, and this, in turn, caused his rebellion against Queen Elizabeth I, which ended with his execution as a traitor in February 1601. Docwra, who had prudently remained in Ireland throughout the crisis, was not suspected of any part in Essex's plotting, and he quickly gained the confidence of Essex's successor as Lord Deputy of Ireland, Mountjoy, although they were later to quarrel over Docwra's policy in Ulster. His biographer remarks that if he was not highly regarded as a politician, Docwra did at least have the true politician's instinct for survival.

== Conquest of Ulster ==
In April 1600 Docwra was given an army of 4200 men to subdue Ulster. He landed at Carrickfergus, and proceeded to Culmore, where he fortified both the ruined castle there and Flogh, near Inishowen, County Donegal. Proceeding to what is now Derry, he fortified the hill and laid out the first streets of the new city. Further up the River Foyle, he fortified Dunnalong, a position dividing Counties Donegal and Tyrone, in July 1600. He constructed Dutch-inspired star-shaped bastion forts, each with a strong earthen rampart, surrounded by a ditch, at the three sites of Culmore, Derry and Dunnalong. He engaged in several skirmishes with the Irish, reportedly winning their admiration for his courage and cunning, and was severely wounded by Black Hugh O'Donnell, a cousin of Red Hugh O'Donnell, chief of the O'Donnell Clan. However, in his early months in Ulster, he showed a certain timidity, which damaged his reputation with the English government. In particular, he was criticised for concentrating his men at Derry, where an epidemic was raging: so many fell sick that his effective force was reduced to 800 men.

Throughout his career in Ulster, he showed remarkable skill in fostering divisions in the leading Irish clans, and he gained the support of several prominent Irish chieftains, including members of the dominant O'Neill and O'Donnell clans. His most notable diplomatic coup was to win for the Crown, at least for a time, the loyalty of Niall Garve O'Donnell, cousin and brother-in-law of Red Hugh. A charge often levelled against Docwra by his enemies was of his gullibility in believing in the promises of loyalty made by the Gaelic chieftains, and differences over this policy of conciliation later led to a quarrel between Docwra and Mountjoy. In fact, Docwra, who was a sensible man, had no expectation of any of the chieftains remaining loyal "if the Spaniards should approach these shores", or if the English suffered any decisive military defeat at the hands of the Irish. His attitude was simply that, so long as it lasted, the support of men like Niall Garve was a political asset which the English should exploit to its fullest extent.

The winter of 1600/1601 was spent in further military expeditions, and in negotiations with the Irish. In 1602 he secured Dungiven Castle from Donnell Ballagh O'Cahan, the principal vassal or 'uriaght' of Hugh O'Neill. This gave him control of most of what is now County Londonderry, and led O'Cahan to switch sides, depriving O'Neill of a large portion of his remaining force. He joined forces with Mountjoy to finally crush Hugh O'Neill, who made his submission to Mountjoy at Mellifont in March 1603. The military campaign is said to have been one of exceptional savagery, resulting in the death of thousands of Irish civilians.

On the death of Queen Elizabeth I, it was Docwra's firm action which prevented a rising in the north of Ireland by his chief Irish ally, Niall Garve O'Donnell, who was infuriated at not having been made Earl of Tyrconnell, a title which was instead conferred on his cousin Rory O'Donnell. Niall was, in the short term, persuaded to trust in the promise of further rewards from the Crown. Clearly, his loyalty could not be depended on for much longer, but then Docwra had never had any trust in the permanent loyalty of the Gaelic chiefs.

== Founder of Derry ==
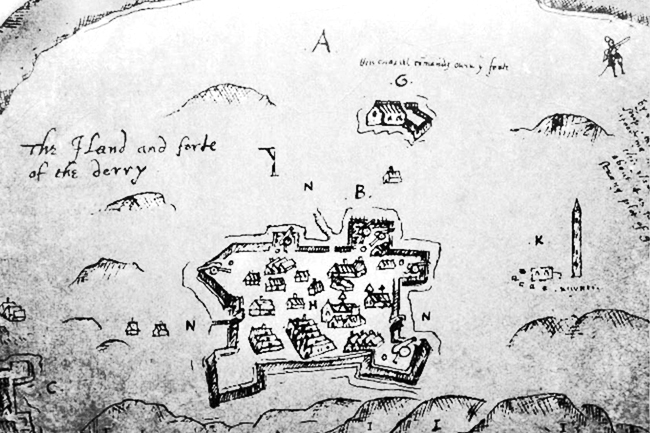
This map of Derry c. 1607 is one of the earliest known images of the city

Docwra's reputation as "the founder of Derry" rests on his early attempts to develop Derry as a city, although in the short term his efforts came to nothing, as the nascent settlement was burnt to the ground in 1608.

Docwra had hoped that his services to the Crown in the Nine Years' War would produce rich rewards, and he seems to have set his heart on being created Lord President of Ulster; but he had never been popular, even it seems with his own soldiers. His career was further damaged by a quarrel with Sir Arthur Chichester, the strong-minded Lord Deputy of Ireland. Also, he lacked powerful friends at court, where he was regarded as something of a nuisance. It was said that there was nothing which the Queen and her Council dreaded more than yet another verbose letter from Docwra, angrily replying to any criticism of his conduct; and despite his later military success, a certain reputation for timidity and indecision remained with him. The old closeness to Essex was held against him, quite unfairly since it was universally agreed that he had played no part in the rebellion. Sir Robert Cecil eventually decided not to trouble the Queen with his letters, and so far as possible, he was simply ignored. He took the appointment of a Muster Master for Derry without his approval or advice being asked as a personal insult, quarrelling bitterly with Humphrey Covet, the first Master, and even more sharply with his successor Reynolds.

He had to be content with being appointed the first provost and 'Governor of Londonderry and Culmore'. The city's first charter empowered him to hold markets and a fair. It was his duty to appoint the sheriffs, the recorder and the justices of the peace and to hold a county court.

Docwra was beginning to tire of life in Ireland, although he did not return to England until 1608. In 1606 he was bought out of his public offices by Sir George Paulet, whose relations with the Irish leaders of Ulster, and particularly the ruler of Inishowen, Sir Cahir O'Doherty, whose loyalty Docwra had sought to win, were far less amicable.

During O'Doherty's subsequent rising in 1608, O'Doherty's foster-father Phelim Reagh MacDavitt killed Paulet in battle and Derry was burned. Docwra's policy of seeking to conciliate the leading Gaelic nobles of Ulster was now utterly discredited. He was accused of neglect of duty and undue leniency towards the native Irish, and retired to England in temporary disgrace. Following the Flight of the Earls, and the O'Doherty rebellion, the English Crown no longer saw any advantage in conciliating the chieftains of Ulster: Docwra's Irish allies were ruined, and many of them, including Donnell O'Cahan, Niall Garve O'Donnell, and his son Neachtain, died as prisoners in the Tower of London.

== Later career ==
During his retirement in England, Sir Henry Docwra protested bitterly to King James I that he had been unfairly accused of incompetence, and of his meagre rewards for his services to the Crown: in particular, he complained of the failure to make him Lord President of Ulster. In 1614 he published his Narrative, which is both a description of, and a justification for, his military actions in Ireland. While obviously self-serving, the Narrative is a valuable source of information for the period.

His decade-long campaign to return to government employment, preferably in Ireland, finally bore fruit. In 1616, following the recall of Lord Deputy Chichester, with whom he had been on bad terms, he was made Treasurer of War for Ireland and returned to live there. In 1621 he was raised to the peerage, with a modest grant of land at Ranelagh, now a suburb but then a village on the south side of Dublin city, and another estate at Donnybrook, also in south Dublin.

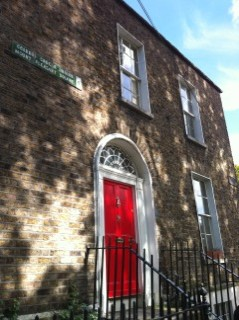
Ranelagh, Dublin, present-day

Despite his title, he was a comparatively poor man, partly because he had not been given the office of Vice-Treasurer of Ireland, which had previously been associated with the office of Treasurer of War, and thus Docrwa's income was half what he might have expected. Assurances of a grant of lands worth £5000 came to nothing, although he did later receive some further lands in County Wicklow. After his death all his colleagues praised him as "an honest man who died poor". As Treasurer he avoided the temptation, to which so many of his contemporaries succumbed, of using his office to enrich himself; in 1618 the English Council commended him to the Lord Deputy of Ireland for his care and diligence in carrying out his duties. His one serious fault as Treasurer, it was generally agreed, was his exceptional slowness in compiling his accounts. In his last years, he admitted to finding the burden of office almost unbearable, and he was willing to sell his office for £4000.

In 1628 he was one of 15 peers empanelled to try Edmond Butler, Lord Dunboyne for manslaughter after Butler had killed his cousin, James Prendergast, in a quarrel over the right of inheritance to an Irish feudal barony. Docwra was the only one to vote "guilty", and Dunboyne was duly acquitted by 14 votes to 1.

Lord Docwra of Culmore died on 18 April 1631 in Dublin, shortly after retiring from his public offices, and was buried in Christ Church Cathedral, Dublin. His fellow Irish councillors sent a petition to their English colleagues, praising him as "an excellent civil servant", who died (relatively) poor, and recommended his widow and surviving children to their care.

== Family ==
He married Anne Vaughan, daughter of Sir Francis Vaughan of Sutton-on-Derwent, Yorkshire, and his wife Anne Boynton, daughter of Sir Thomas Boynton of Barmston, East Riding of Yorkshire, and Frances Frobisher. They had two sons, Theodore and Henry. Theodore, the elder son, succeeded to the barony but died without issue. Little is known of him except that he was obliged to sell his Ranelagh estate and was living in poverty when he died in England in 1647: since his brother Henry had predeceased him, the title became extinct. The 1st Baron also had three daughters, Anne, Frances, who died young, and Elizabeth. Anne married Captain Shore of Fermanagh. Elizabeth married firstly in 1640 Andrew Wilson of Wilson's Fort, Killynure, near Convoy in the east of County Donegal, but seems to have had no surviving issue, and secondly, as his third wife, Sir Henry Brooke of Brookeborough and had issue, including George.

Lady Docwra of Culmore outlived her husband and both of her sons, and survived till 1648: like her elder son, she was living in a state of some poverty in her later years, despite receiving a legacy from the 1st Earl of Cork, who had been a close friend and ally of her late husband in his last years.

== Character ==
As a soldier Docwra was brave, skilful and ruthless; even the Irish reportedly admired him as "an illustrious knight of wisdom and prudence, a pillar of battle and conflict". He showed considerable skill in negotiating with the Irish clans of Ulster, and was known for fomenting quarrels among them to strengthen the Crown's position. Historians have remarked that the accusations made against Docwra by his political enemies of excessive "leniency" towards the Irish would have astonished the Irish themselves, thousands of whom are said to have died, directly or indirectly, as a result of his actions. As Treasurer of War, he had his critics, but he also enjoyed an enviable reputation for being diligent, conscientious and upright, if rather slow in conducting business.

In his private life, he had a reputation for being honest, public-spirited, and a man of independent judgment. In religious matters he is said, by the standards of the time, to have been tolerant enough. While there is no doubt that English troops who were under his command killed a number of priests, his biographer argues that Docwra neither ordered nor approved of these killings.

Peerage of Ireland
New creation	Baron Docwra of Culmore; 1621–1631	Succeeded by Theodore Dockwra
