= Cahir O'Doherty =

Gaelic Irish chief (1587–1608)

Cahir O'Doherty Cathaoir Ó Dochartaigh
- Lord of Inishowen
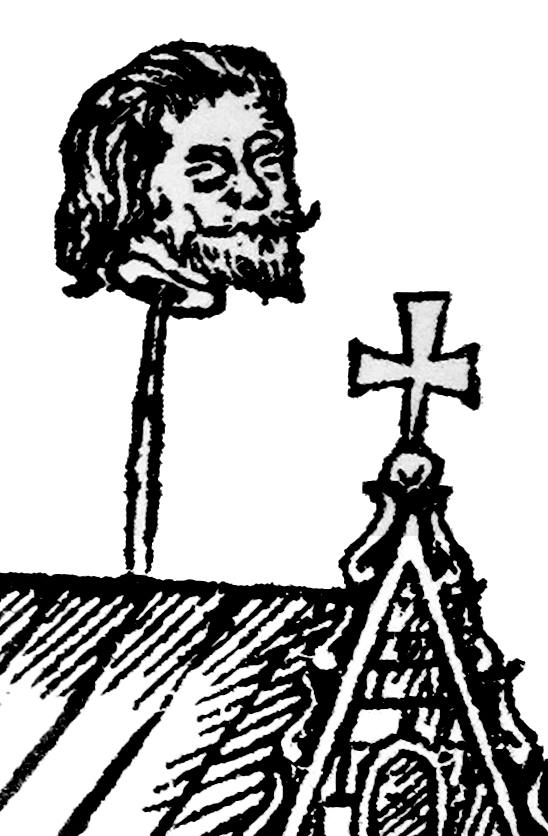
- Contemporary illustration of O'Doherty's severed head on a spike in Dublin
- Predecessor: Sir John O'Doherty
- Other names: Queen's O'Doherty
- Born: 1587; Ireland
- Died: 5 July 1608 (aged 21) near Kilmacrennan, County Donegal, Ireland
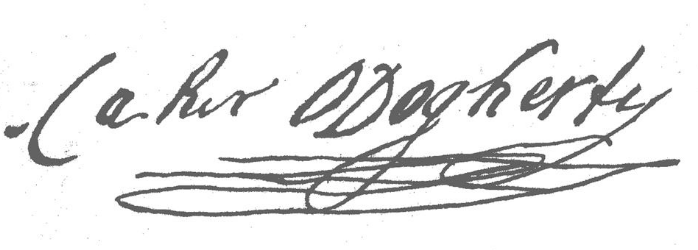
- Signature

Sir Cahir O'Doherty (Irish: Cathaoir Ó Dochartaigh or Caṫaoir Ó Doċartaiġ; 1587 – 5 July 1608) was the last Gaelic Irish chief of the O'Doherty clan, who in 1608 launched a failed rebellion against the English crown.

O'Doherty was the eldest son of clan chief John O'Doherty, ruler of Inishowen. O'Doherty and his father initially fought for the Irish confederacy in the Nine Years' War. Following his father's death, his clan became embroiled in a succession dispute. O'Doherty, aged 15, defected to the English and became known as the Queen's O'Doherty for his service on the Crown's side. After the war, O'Doherty had ambitions to become a courtier and applied for a position in the household of Henry Frederick, Prince of Wales, but he increasingly came into dispute with Irish-based officials such as the Viceroy Sir Arthur Chichester and the Governor of Derry Sir George Paulet. In 1608, he launched a rebellion, seizing Derry from Paulet and burning it to the ground. O'Doherty was subsequently killed in a battle at Kilmacrennan, and the rebellion swiftly collapsed.

== Early life ==
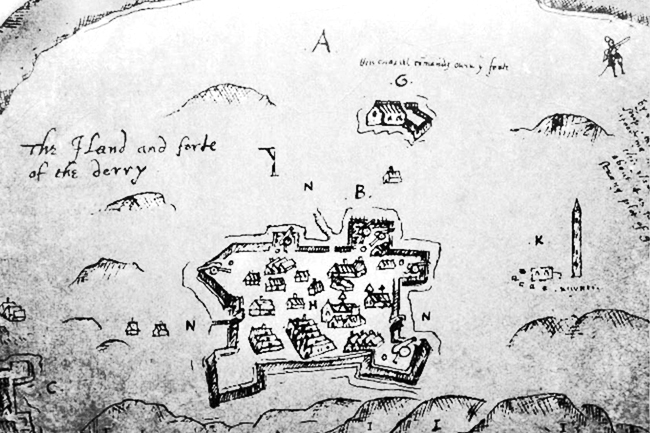
One of the oldest depictions of fort Derry, Ireland. Derry was sacked and burned by Clans O'Doherty & McDavitt in 1608.

Cahir was the eldest son of Sir John O'Doherty, O'Doherty clan chief and effective ruler of Inishowen. One of Cahir's younger sisters was Rosa who married Cathbarr O'Donnell and later Owen Roe O'Neill. A third was Margaret, who married Oghie O'Hanlon. Cahir was fourteen when his father died, and he had to spend the next few years gaining control of his lordship. Cahir's foster father was Phelim Reagh MacDavitt (Mac Daibhéid).

Cahir was knighted by Lord Mountjoy, and for a time he seemed prepared to work amicably with the English authorities: he found a strong supporter in Sir Henry Docwra, the first Governor of Derry. His marriage to Mary Preston, daughter of the 4th Viscount Gormanston, allied him to some of the leading nobles of the Pale, including Thomas FitzWilliam, 1st Viscount FitzWilliam, who in 1608 was required to stand surety for O'Doherty's good behaviour.

O'Doherty and Niall Garve O'Donnell, the main rival of Red Hugh O'Donnell for the leadership of the O'Donnell dynasty, were the principal Gaelic chieftains whose support the English Crown hoped to gain through a policy of moderation, and for a time this policy seemed to be working.

== O'Doherty's Rebellion ==
Niall encouraged O'Doherty to rebel against the Crown, though Niall had ulterior motives for doing so. The English government had previously reneged on promises to grant Niall a patent to his clan's lands of Tyrconnell, which encompassed Inishowen. Niall distanced himself from the rebellion, as he clearly hoped to be awarded Inishowen in the event of a failed rebellion.

After the Flight of the Earls and angered by the eviction of his clansmen during the subsequent Plantation of Ulster, in 1608 Sir Cahir sacked and burned the town of Derry. Cahir's foster father, Felim Riabhach McDavitt (Mac Daibhéid), killed Docwra's successor as Governor, Sir George Paulet, with whom Cahir had repeatedly quarrelled. Paulet has been accused of goading O'Doherty into taking up arms by a calculated series of insults under the code of conduct of an Irish clan chief. Paulet was also said to have physically assaulted O'Doherty. Niall Garve O'Donnell, previously a loyal supporter of the English Crown, was also accused of supporting the rebellion. O'Doherty's precise motives for the rebellion are unclear, and its timing is also something of a puzzle, especially as the Privy Council of Ireland had just ordered that the Clan's confiscated and planted lands be restored to him. Taking revenge on Paulet was perhaps a sufficient motive in itself.

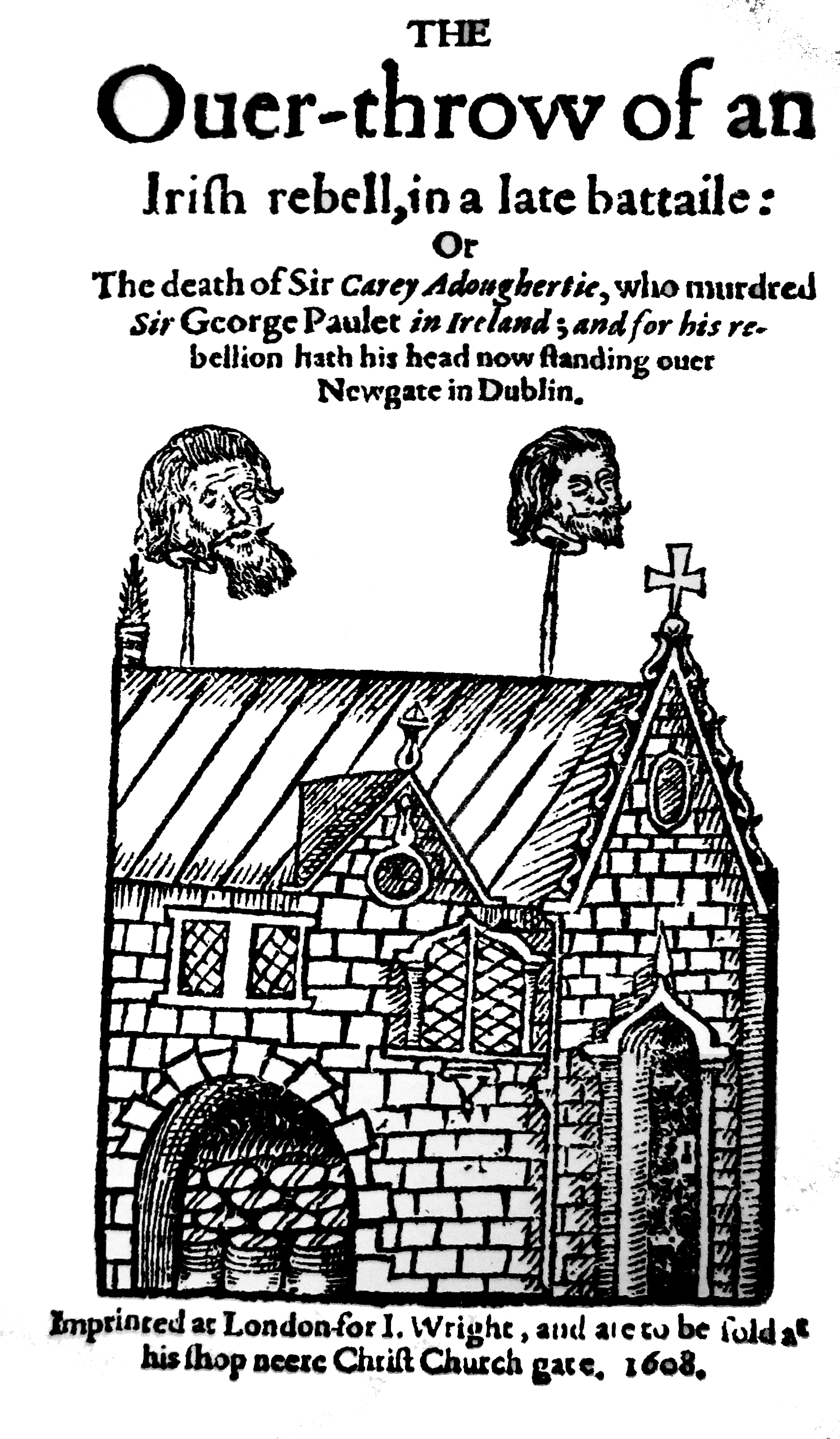
Newgate, Dublin. 1608. Displaying the heads of Irish rebels Cahir O'Doherty (right) and Felim Riabhach McDavitt (left).

O'Doherty was shot in the head and killed during the Battle of Kilmacrennan on 5 July against a counter-attacking force under Lord Powerscourt. O'Doherty was 21 years old. His surviving soldiers retreated and made a last stand during the Siege of Tory Island.

== Legacy ==
His severed head was displayed on a spike over Newgate Prison in Dublin for some time afterwards. Niall Garve O'Donnell and his son Neachtain were arrested and sent to the Tower of London, where they died.

According to historian Brian Bonner, "While and where the old traditions were retained in Inis Eoghain, Cathaoir was seen as a mighty one of the Gael. He was loved and honoured. His memory was revered, and his relationship with his line was a privilege which brought dignity and status to the rightful claimant. The passage of time has now dimmed his memory, and the English-speaking native community has developed a distorted view of this great son of Inis Eoghain. It is indeed a paradox that the planters' view of the 'villain' who sacked Culmore and burned Derry has been passed on to the descendants of those whom Cathaoir Rua strove to defend and protect."

During the 1990s, the Chief Herald of Ireland offered recognition to descendants of the chiefs of some ancient clans as recognised under the English system of primogeniture, rather than the original Brehon Law succession practice of tanistry, calling them the Chiefs of the Name. The chieftainship of the Dohertys was claimed by Dr. Ramón Salvador O'Dogherty, who claimed descent from Cahir O'Doherty's brother, Sean.

In July 1990, an O'Dogherty clan gathering was held, and Ramon Salvador O'Dogherty was installed as "Chief of the Name" at a ceremony in Belmont House (present-day Shantallow, County Londonderry). O'Dogherty received a traditional white wand of office and a sword which Cahir O'Doherty bore at the time of his death in battle at Kilmacrenan in 1608.

== Bibliography and further reading ==
- Bonner, Brian (1985) [1975]. That Audacious Traitor. Digitized by the Internet Archive in 2018 with funding from Kahle/Austin Foundation. Pallaskenry: Salesian Press Trust. ISBN 978-0-9505076-2-0.
- Casway, Jerrold (1984). Owen Roe O'Neill and the Struggle for Catholic Ireland. Philadelphia: University of Pennsylvania. ISBN 0-8122-7895-X.
- Connolly, S. J., ed. (2007). The Oxford Companion to Irish History (2 ed.). Oxford: Oxford University Press. doi:10.1093/acref/9780199234837.001.0001. ISBN 978-0-19-923483-7. "O'Doherty, Sir Cahir". p. 422.
- Dougherty, Rob (2008). O'Doherty's Rebellion.
- Jefferies, Henry A. (December 2009). "Prelude to plantation: Sir Cahir O'Doherty's rebellion in 1608". History Ireland. 17 (6): 16–19. JSTOR 40588447.
- Gillespie, Raymond (2006). Seventeenth-Century Ireland: Making Ireland Modern. Dublin: Gill & MacMillan. ISBN 978-0-7171-3946-0.
- Lenihan, Pádraig (2008). Consolidating Conquest: Ireland 1603–1727. London: Routledge. ISBN 978-0-582-77217-5.
- McCavitt, John (2002). The Flight of the Earls, An Illustrated History. Dublin: Gill & MacMillan.
