= O'Doherty family =

Irish clan

O'Doherty Ó Dochartaigh
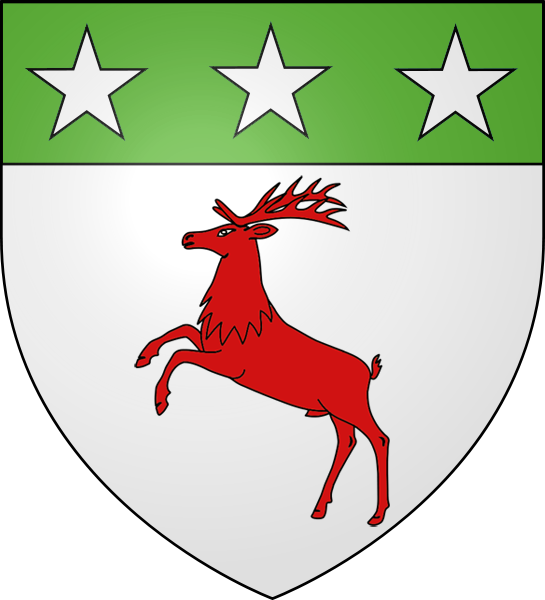
- Parent house: Northern Uí Néill
- Country: Ireland
- Founded: 10th century
- Founder: Dochartach
- Final ruler: Cahir O'Doherty (died 1608)
- Historic seat: Carrickabraghy Castle
- Titles: Chief of Cenél Eanna; Lord of Inishowen

The O'Doherty (Irish: Ó Dochartaigh) family of Inishowen in County Donegal is an Irish clan who were a prominent sept of the Northern Uí Néill's Cenél Conaill, and one of the most powerful clans of Tír Connaill.

Originally chiefs of Cenél Eanna, the O'Dohertys became rulers of Inishowen, a large peninsula in what is now County Donegal. They ruled this territory from the beginning of the 15th century until the early 17th century, when their lands and possessions were confiscated following Sir Cahir O'Doherty's rebellion, and as part of the Ulster plantation. The O'Dohertys are kinsmen of the O'Donnells, rulers of Tír Connaill, and the O'Gallaghers, and senior descendants of Conall Gulban, founder of Cenél Conaill and a son of Niall of the Nine Hostages.

Like clans in other cultures, Irish clans such as the O'Dohertys are divided into many septs and regional families. In the modern day, there are over 140 variations in spelling of the name Ó Dochartaigh, of which O'Doherty and Doherty are the most common anglicized forms.

== Naming conventions ==
Male	Daughter	Wife (Long)	Wife (Short)
Ó Dochartaigh	Ní Dhochartaigh	Bean Uí Dhochartaigh	Uí Dhochartaigh

== Origins ==
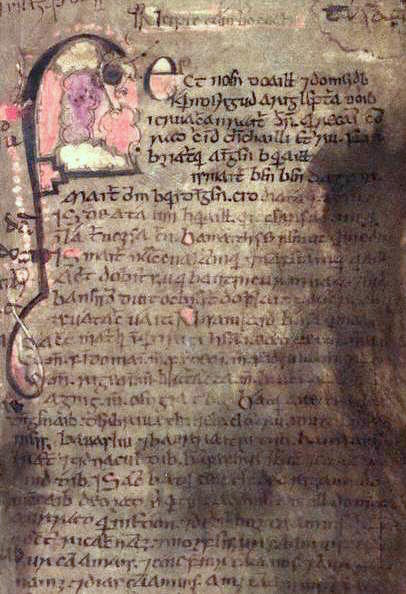
Lebor Gabála Érenn is recorded in more than a dozen medieval manuscripts including the Book of Leinster shown here, which is just one of the primary sources of text. Image: Dublin, TCD, MS 1339 (olim MS H 2.18)

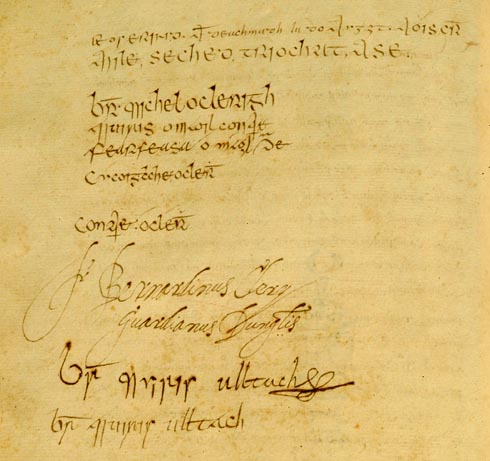
Signatures of the authors of the Annals of the Four Masters, compiled between 1632 and 1636 AD from earlier annals by Brother Mícheál Ó Cléirigh from Ballyshannon, who was assisted by, among others, Cú Choigcríche Ó Cléirigh, Fearfeasa Ó Maol Chonaire and Cú Choigríche Ó Duibhgeannáin

The O’Dohertys are named after Dochartach (fl. 10th century), a member of the Cenél Conaill dynasty which in medieval Irish genealogy traced itself to Niall of the Nine Hostages (see Uí Néill). Their coat of arms is a gules rampant stag in an argent field, vert chief with three stars. The clan motto is Ár nDuthchas (English: Our heritage).

In Munster O'Doherty is often a different surname, Ó Dubhartaigh, which has sometimes been anglicized as Doorty in County Clare.

The O’Doherty clan and family name is one of the most ancient in Europe. The clan traces its pedigree through history, pre-history and mythology to the second millennium BC. Their story was transmitted orally for thousands of years and was first put in writing by Christian monks between the 6th and 11th centuries AD. The principal written sources are manuscripts, genealogies, king-lists, chronologies and poems including:

- The Lebor Gabala Érenn (the Book of the Taking of Ireland, usually known in English as The Book of Invasions or The Book of Conquests, and in Modern Irish as Leabhar Gabhála Éireann or Leabhar Gabhála na hÉireann) was compiled in Irish in the 11th century AD. It is now considered primarily myth rather than history by most scholars.
- The Annals of Ulster, spanning the years from AD 431 to AD 1540. Written in Irish and Latin.
- The Annals of the Four Masters (Irish: Annála na gCeithre Máistrí), a.k.a. the Annals of the Kingdom of Ireland (Irish: Annála Ríoghachta Éireann) were compiled between 1632 and 1636. Written in Irish.
- The Foras Feasa ar Éirinn (English: Foundation of Knowledge on Ireland) chronology was compiled by Geoffrey Keating (Irish: Seathrún Céitinn) in 1634. Written in Irish.

According to these sources, the O’Dohertys are descended from Breogán, the famous Celtic King of Galicia in Spain in the second millennium BC. His grandson Galam, famously known as Míl Espáine (Irish: Soldier of Spain) a.k.a. Milesius, gave his name to the Milesians who are said to have been the first Celtic (or Gaelic) peoples of Ireland). Breogan's great-grandson Érimón was one of the Celtic chieftains who conquered Ireland from the pre-Celtic neolithic Tuatha Dé Danann (Irish: People of the Goddess Danu), and was the first Milesian King of Ireland.

Érimón was King of Ireland from c. 1700 – 1684 BC according to the Annals of the Four Masters, although the Foras Feasa ar Éirinn calculates his reign from 1287 to 1272 BC.

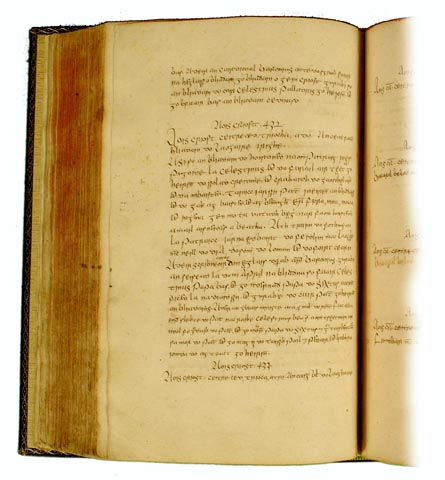
Annals of the Four Masters, entry for the year 432 AD

The O’Doherty clan traces its descent from Erimon through some 150 generations of his descendants including 54 kings and 26 princes. Notable among Erimon's descendants are:

Eochu Feidlech a.k.a. Eochaid (i.e. the enduring) was High King of Ireland in the 4th century BC and the father of Queen Medb or Maeve the great warrior Queen of Connacht who started the famous Táin Bó Cúailnge (English: Cattle Raid of Cooley) to steal Ulster's prize stud bull, opposed by the teenage Ulster hero Cú Chulainn.

Túathal Techtmar (1st century BC), high King of Ireland and ancestor of the O’Neill and Connachta dynasties.

Conn of the Hundred Battles (Irish: Conn Cétchathach), High King of Ireland in the 2nd century AD. He was the ancestor of the Connachta and, through his descendant Niall Noígiallach, the Uí Néill dynasties, which dominated Ireland in the early Middle Ages. Conn appointed the legendary hero Finn MacCool (Irish: Fionn mac Cumhaill) the last leader of the Fianna, the small, semi-independent warrior bands in Irish mythology.

Niall of the Nine Hostages (Irish: Niall Noígíallach), King of the Northern half of Ireland from c. 368–395 AD The O’Neill dynasty which he founded were High Kings of Ireland for 400 years, and ruled their own Kingdom of Aileach for 8 centuries from 465 to 1283. His grandson Saint Columba (Irish: Colum Cillle) (7 December 521 – 9 June 597) introduced Christianity to what is today Scotland at the start of the Hiberno-Scottish mission. He founded the important Abbey of Iona on the Scottish island of the same name, which became a dominant religious and political institution in the region for centuries. He is the Patron Saint of Derry. The O’Neill dynasty includes the O’Donnell Kings, Princes and Lords of Tyrconnell, and the O’Doherty Princes or Lords of Inishowen in County Donegal. These titles were given through the traditional proto-democratic system of election by tanistry (the form of elective monarchy based on patrilineal relationship that characterised the succession of the ancient Gaelic clans under Brehon law. However, after the Anglo-Norman and English conquests of Ireland, the aristocratic titles of Irish Kings and clan chieftains were designated by the foreign system of primogeniture through which the first-born "legitimate" son would automatically inherit his father's title and or property (which transmitting and concentrating power and wealth to men with no regard of their merit or ability).

King Conall Gulban (died c. 464 AD) was the son of Niall Naoigiallach. He is the eponymous ancestor of the Cenél Conaill, and founded and gave his name to the kingdom of Tír Chonaill, comprising much of what is now County Donegal in Ulster. He is important in the history of Irish Christianity as he was the first Gaelic nobleman baptised by St. Patrick, thus opening the way for the conversion of the nobility in Ireland. The Kingdom of Tyrconnell was part of the Kingdom of Aileach until 1185 AD.

Donagh Dochartach, who lived in the 9th century AD, gave his name to the O'Doherty family. The later chiefs of the clan, elected by tanistry under the Brehon Laws, became the Lords of Inishowen after migrating from their original territory in the Laggan valley area of present-day Donegal, into the vacuum left by the end of Meic Lochlainn rule in Inishowen, the northernmost peninsula of the island of Ireland.

Conor-an-Einigh O Dochartaigh (1359–1413) was the first of the clan to settle in Inishowen, namely at Castleross in the parish of Desertegney (Irish: Díseart Einigh, i.e. the refuge or hiding place of Einigh) which is named after him. Other members of the clan subsequently born in Desertagny include a brother of the rebel Sir Cahir O’Doherty (1587–1608) and the ancestors of the politician Joseph O’Doherty who lived a few miles further south in the same parish at Gortyarrigan.

== Modern history ==
Seán More O Dochartaigh (Abt. 1505 – 26 May 1582 or 1566?) had castles at Aileach, Inch and Burt. The O’Doherty's were called the ‘Lords of Inishowen’. An agreement was reached in abt. 1540 that O’Dochartaigh would not cross the River Foyle if the British would stay out of Inishowen. In doing this under the process called Surrender and Regrant, Seán Mor O’Dochartaigh bent the knee before the English King Henry VIII in 1541 and became Sir John O’Doherty. This strategy essentially sought to assimilate the Gaelic leadership into the new Tudor Kingdom of Ireland and the Anglican Church.

Sir John Og O’Doherty (Abt. 1540–1601, Lord in 1582). Son of Seán Mor O’Doherty and Rosa O’Donnell. Lived at Burt Castle. In 1600 he protected Inishowen against an invasion by the English fleet which had set up three forts around Lough Foyle, one of which was built on the O’Dogherty estate at Culmore. Later in 1600, he slew Colonel Sir John Chamberlain and many members of the English army who had marched against him. John Og was slain on 27 January 1601. "There was not a lord of a barony amongst the Irish more distinguished for manual action and hospitality, or more bold in counsel than he."

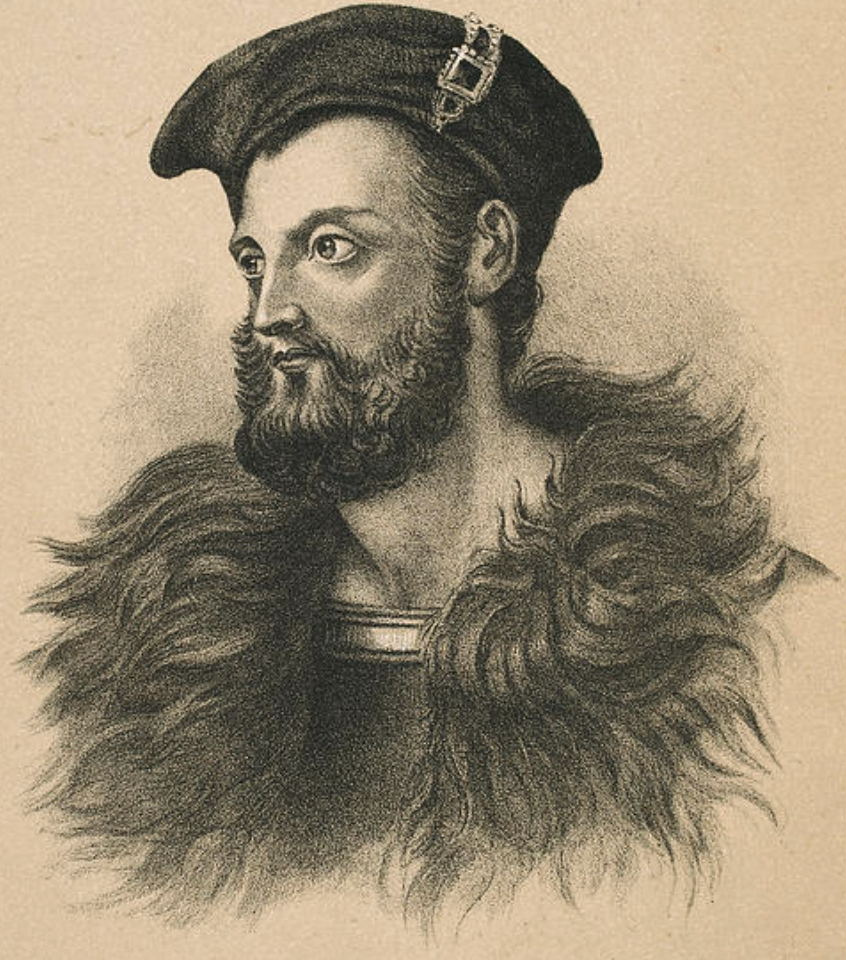
Owen Roe O'Neill (1585 – 1649). Second husband of Rosa O'Doherty. Lithograph copy of a painting attributed to the Flemish artist Van Brugens.

Rosa O’Doherty (Irish: Róisín Ní Dhochartaigh) (c. 1588 – 1660) was the daughter of Sir John O’Doherty and the younger sister of Sir Cahir O’Doherty. Rosa was first married to Cathbarr O’Donnell, the younger brother of Rory O’Donnell, the last King of Tyrconnell and then 1st Earl of Tyrconnell. Cathbarr, Rosa and her infant son Hugh accompanied Rory to Continental Europe during the 1607 Flight of the Earls, which signalled the end of the ancient Gaelic nobility in Ireland. They embarked on a French ship from Rathmullan on the shore of Lough Swilly heading for La Coruña in Spain on 14 September with the Earls O’Neill and O’Donnell along with a great number of the nobles of the province of Ulster. The Annals of the Four Masters described the event as follows: "That was a distinguished company for one ship, for it is most certain that the sea has not borne nor the wind wafted from Ireland in the latter times a party in any one ship more eminent, illustrious, and noble than they were, in point of genealogy, or more distinguished for great deeds, renown, feats of arms, and valorous achievements; and would that God had granted them to remain in their patrimonies, until their youths should arrive at the age of manhood! Woe to the heart that meditated! Woe to the mind that planned! Woe to the Council that determined on the project which caused the party who went on that voyage to depart, while they had no prospect to the end of their lives of returning safe to their hereditary estates or patrimonial inheritance." Rosa's husband Cathbarr O’Donnell died of fever in Italy the following year, leaving Rosa widow at the age of twenty. In 1613–14 she married Owen Roe O’Neill, an Irish officer serving in the Spanish army whom she met in Flanders. His great-grandfather was Conn O’Neill, 1st Earl of Tyrone, the most powerful figure in Ulster and the first Ó Néill to take a title from the Crown as part of the surrender and regrant policy. At the peak of his lengthy reign, he was the most powerful Irish king. He was known throughout Europe as a strong and able leader, a hearty warrior, and looked to by the Catholic world as a bastion of strength against the English crown, despite his conversion to the Protestant faith. In 1642 Rosa returned to Ireland when Owen Roe came back to serve the Irish Confederacy during the War of Three Kingdoms. She landed at Wexford in the company of Colonel Richard O’Farrell with supplies and reinforcements for her husband's Ulster Army. Owen Roe became a leading figure of the Irish Confederacy, enjoying mixed fortunes but winning a notable success against Scottish forces at the Battle of Benburb in 1646. Following the Irish Rebellion of 1641, O’Neill returned and took command of the Ulster Army of the Irish Confederates. Owen Roe O’Neill died of natural causes at Cloughoughter Castle in Cavan November 1649. Rosa had been in Galway and arrived a few days after her husband's death. She went to Flanders following the Cromwellian conquest of Ireland, living in Brussels until her death in 1660. She was buried near the altar of the Franciscan College of St. Anthony of Padua in Louvain. The Latin inscription on the stone slab that covers her grave (here translated into English) reads as follows: "To the Greater Glory of God —Here lies awaiting the Resurrection D.O.M. The Most Excellent Lady Rosa O’Docharty, Daughter and Sister of Chiefs of Inishowen. The honour of her exalted race; illustrious by character and by her splendid alliances. She was first married to that eminent man, her kinsman Lord Cathbar O’Donnell, Chief of Tirconnell. Subsequently she married, His Excellency Lord Eugene O’Neill, Commander-in-Chief of the Catholic Army in Ulster. She experienced good and evil fortune, And strove through her beneficience to become worth of Heaven. She was more than seventy years when she died in Brussels, 1st November A.D. 1670. This monument was erected by her first-born son Hugh O’Donnell. Here, her body awaits the resurrection."

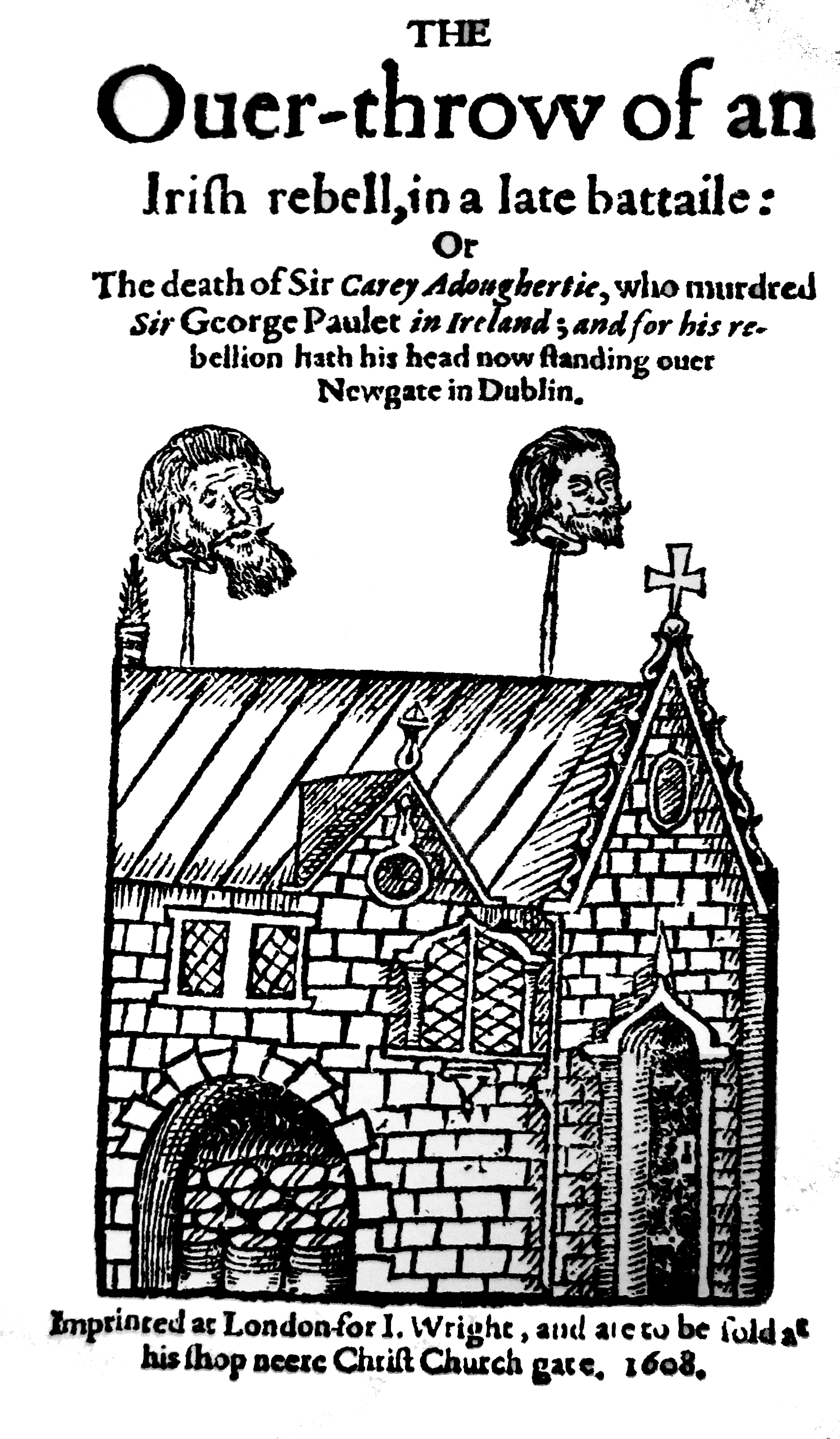
The severed heads of Sir Cahir O'Doherty (right) and Felim Riabhach McDavitt (left) displayed on pikes at Newgate, Dublin, 1608

Sir Cahir O'Doherty (1587–1608) was the last Gaelic Lord of Inishowen. Following the Flight of the Earls in 1607, he rebelled against English domination in Ireland and the plantation of Protestant settlers in what is known as O'Doherty's Rebellion. Provoked by the English Governor George Paulet, Cahir and his followers attacked and destroyed Derry and burned several castles in Strabane and Lifford in 1608. However, the King's Marshal Richard Wingfield (1st Viscount Powerscourt) recovered the city in a counter-attack and on 5 July 1608, Sir Cahir was killed at the Rock of Doon during the Battle of Kilmacrennan on 5 July 1608. The remaining rebels were then crushed by Sir Arthur Chichester who received the Lordship of Inishowen for himself, together with a grant of O’Doherty's entire 170,000 acres of land in Inishowen.

After this loss the O'Doherty family lost much of its power and influence. By 1784, the leading branch of the family (i.e. with titles recognised according to the English system of primogeniture) fled the country and has not returned since.

== Clan "chiefs" ==
During the 1990s, the Chief Herald of Ireland offered recognition to descendants of the Chiefs of the most ancient clans as recognised under the English system of primogeniture, rather than the original Brehon Law succession practice of tanistry, calling them the Chiefs of the Name. The chieftainship of the Dohertys was thus claimed by Dr. Ramón Salvador O'Dogherty.

In July 1990, an O'Dogherty Clan Gathering was held and Ramon Salvador O'Dogherty of Spain was ceremonially installed as Chief of the Name at the ancient inaugural stone in Belmont House, Derry. O'Dogherty received the traditional white wand of office and was handed the sword which Cahir O'Doherty bore during his death in battle in 1608. However, after Terence MacCarthy was exposed as a fraud after being recognised as Chief of the MacCarthy clan, a scandal threw the credibility of the "chiefs of the name" into question, including that of Ramon O'Dogherty in Spain.

== Clan reunions ==
Today, there are Doherty families in many parts of Ireland, with primary concentration in their homeland of the Inishowen Peninsula, County Donegal and the vicinity of Derry. The O’Dohertys are an important part of the Irish diaspora. To this end, the family continues through voluntary organisations, exploring family and Irish history and hosting regular family reunions.

The Ó Dochartaigh Clann Association was formed in the 1980s by a collaboration of American and Canadian clanfolk with its base in Michigan. It operated from Inch Island, Co. Donegal, from 1985 until 1999, and from Buncrana from 1999 until 2007. The association is now a charitable society based near Seattle WA, again offering international membership and a newsletter.

Ó Doherty reunions have been hosted in Ireland every five years since 1985, by the Ó Dochartaigh Irish Reunion Committee (an amalgamation of the reunion committees from Inishowen and Derry). A special reunion was held in July 2008, commemorating the 1608 death of Cahir Ó Doherty. The reunion scheduled for 23–28 July 2020 was cancelled due to COVID. In 2005 the reunion hosted the film premiere of Roots of a Man – "A Journey Through The Land of the Clan O'Doherty".

== O'Doherty castles ==
The O’Dohertys built or occupied numerous castles to defend their territory of Inishowen against Viking, Saxon, Anglo-Norman and English invaders. These included:

- Caisleán Nua (a.k.a. Green Castle or Northburgh Castle), located in Greencastle on the western shores of Lough Foyle. It was built in 1305 for the 2nd Earl of Ulster, an Anglo-Norman lord, to control access to the lough. It was taken by the O’Dohertys in 1332 or 1333 following the collapse of Norman power in the western part of Ulster, and held by the O’Doherty clan for 222 years before it was destroyed by siege in 1555.
- O’Doherty's Keep in Buncrana that was inhabited by the O’Dohertys in 1602 but seized in 1608 by the English.
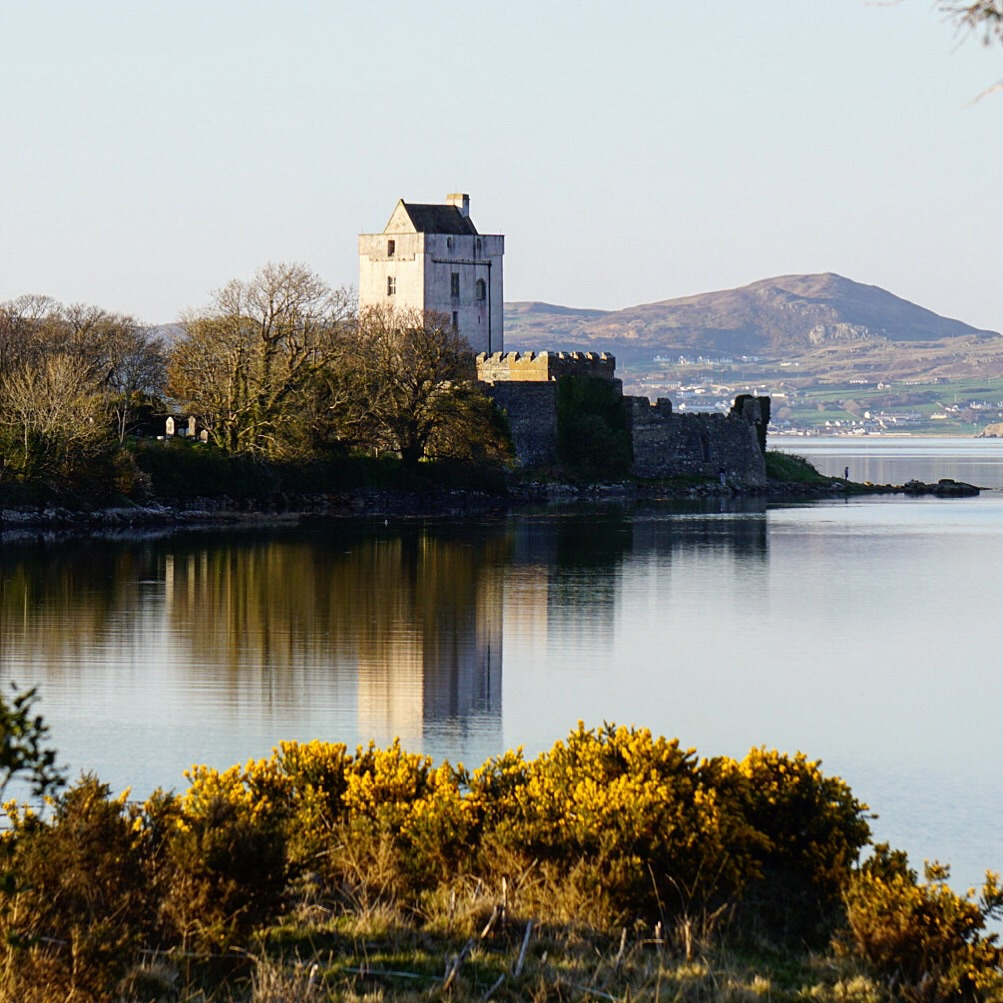
- Doe Castle
  Doe Castle near Creeslough. Built in the early 1400s, it was one of Tír Chonaill's strongest fortifications and played a pivotal role in Irish history. Sir Cahir O’Doherty set up his headquarters here before his attack on Derry in 1608. The castle was recovered by the MacSweeney Clan in 1641, and it was at Doe Castle that Owen Roe O’Neill landed on his return from Europe in 1642 to lead the Ulster Army of the Irish Confederate forces during the Wars of the Three Kingdoms, when Scotland and Ireland rebelled against England, leading to the execution of King Charles I of England and Scotland and the start of the Cromwellian conquest of Ireland, both in 1649.
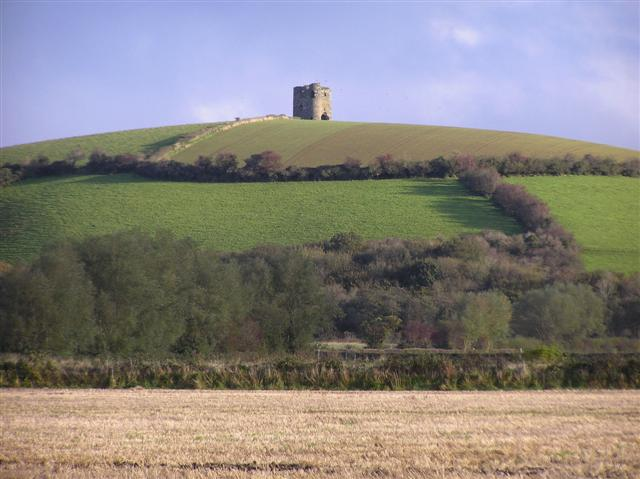
- Burt Castle
  Carrickabraghy Castle stands on a rocky outcrop at the north-western extremity of Doagh Island, at the head of Pollan Bay, in the north of Inishowen. The place is first mentioned in 834. The castle was built before 1600 by Phelemy Brasleigh O’Doherty. Because of its seclusion, it was chosen by Sir Cahir O’Doherty to plan his revolt in 1608.
- Culmore Castle (Irish: Cuil-Mor, meaning "large point" or "angle") on the Foyle river estuary north of Derry. This was an ancient fort of the O’Dohertys according to the poet Dugald Mac Fadyen in a footnote to his poem, Cahir Roe. The castle was first held by the Crown of England in 1559 but was captured by Sir Cahir O’Doherty in April 1608 the day before he besieged and destroyed the English settlement at Derry.
- Burt Castle (built around 1560–1580 by the O’Dohertys); Sir Cahair O’Doherty took up residence there in 1601.
- O’Doherty's Tower in Derry. Built in 1615 by Patrick O’Doherty "to satisfy tax liability owed to the O’Donnells".

== See also ==
- Docherty (surname)
- Doherty (surname)
- O'Doherty
- Glen Docherty, a glen (valley) in Wester Ross, Scotland
- Ní Dochartaigh
