= Glashedy =

Island in County Donegal, Ireland

Native name: Glaiséidí
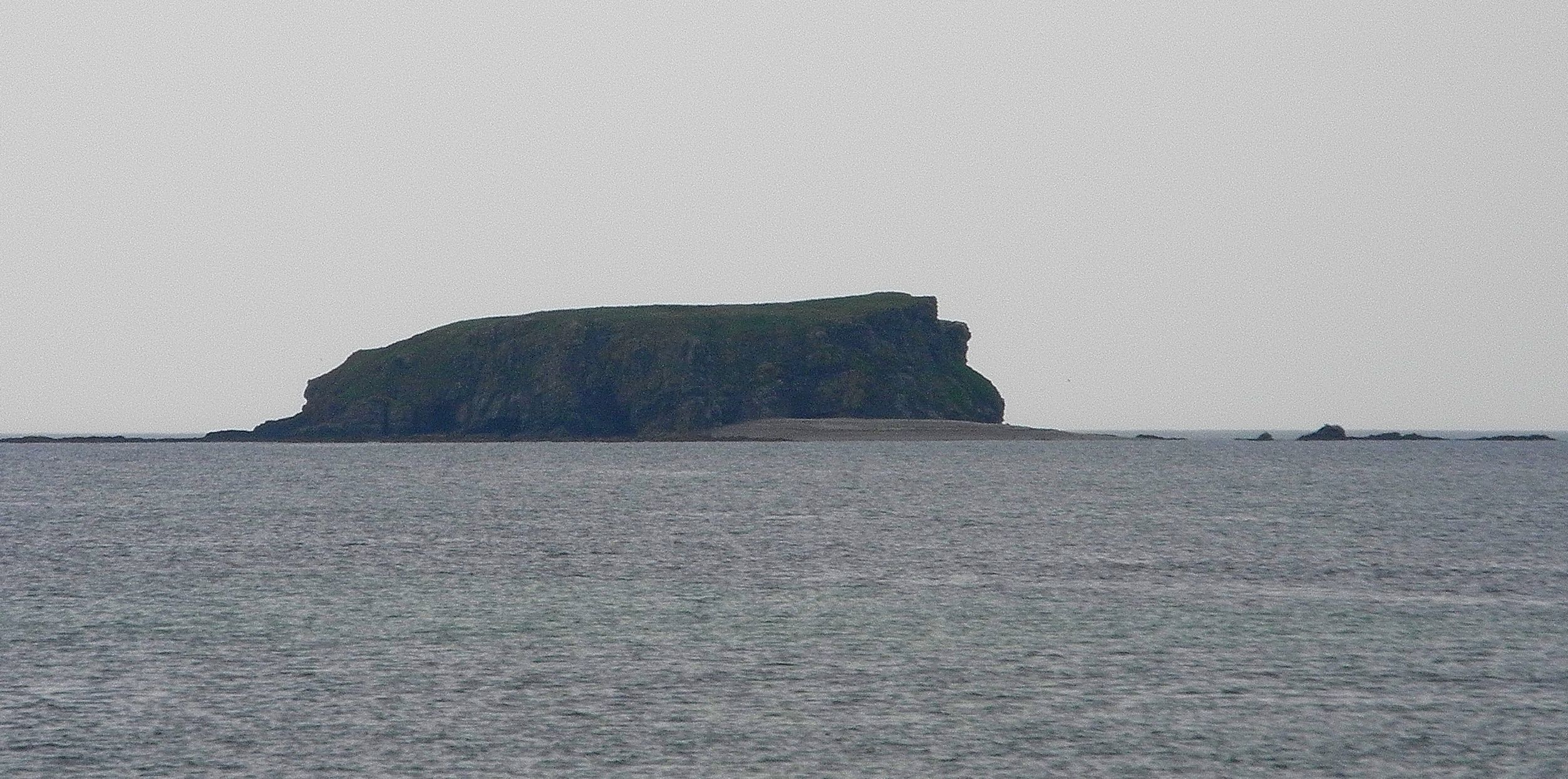
- Glashedy from Pollan Beach (Ballyliffin)

- Location within island of Ireland

Geography
- Location: Atlantic Ocean
- Coordinates: 55°19′02″N 7°24′09″W

Administration
- Ireland
- Province: Ulster
- County: Donegal

Demographics
- Population: 0

Glashedy Island (Irish: Glaiséidí) is an uninhabited island approximately 1 mile (2 km) off Pollan strand, 2 miles (3 km) west of Trawbreaga Bay, and about 4 miles (6 km) south of Malin Head, Donegal, Ireland. Glashedy Island has an area of 22,548 m^{2} which is equivalent to 2.25 hectares (5.57 acres / 5 acres, 2 roods, 11 perches). At its highest point, it is 119 ft high.

The sea around the island is potentially very dangerous for shipping and unsafe for anchorage. Rocks and breakers extend up to 1,000 metres from all sides of the Island. The waters are relatively shallow at between 4 and 5 fathoms. The shoals to the north of the island are particularly treacherous, lying at a depth of just 3 fathoms. Glashedy Sound is the channel between the island and the shore. It is also shallow. The island contains a number of caves. The island principally comprises quartzite.

== Etymology ==
Its former name until the early 17th century was Seale Island. The English translation of the name is the Island of the Green Cloak derived from the layer of grass present on the top. The island is sometimes called Glashedy Rock.

== History ==
There are references to the Island in a number of historical-geographical surveys of Inishowen. It is referred to as Seale Island in the King James Patent Role of 1621. It is called Glasseve in the Civil Survey of 1654.

"Wee have likewise some small inconsiderrable ffishings, vizt one small sallmon ffishing in ye river in ye river of Boncrannogh one seale ffishing in the island of Glasseve one litle sallmon ffishing in the River of Strabregg and a less in Loghfoile all wch."

Crow's Maps of Donegal Estates, which was compiled between 1767 and 1770, uses its current name of Glashedy. In Griffiths Valuation (1858) the Island is also called Glashedy, with ownership of the island attributed to John Harvey of Clonmany, Donegal.

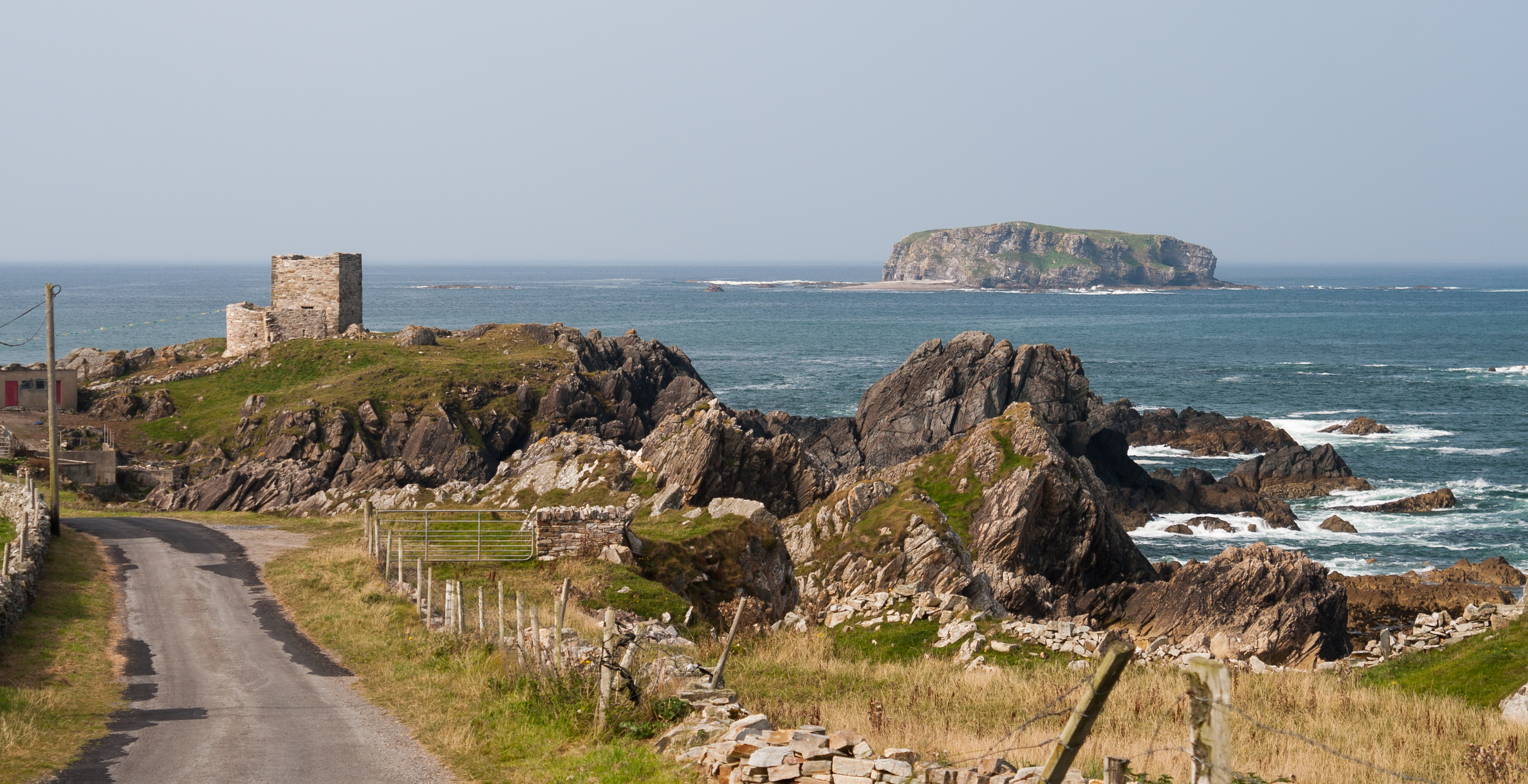
Glashedy Island as seen from the Isle of Doagh with Carrickabraghy Castle in the foreground

On Wednesday, 24 November 1841, a schooner called the James Cook was hit by a gale and struck some rocks near Glashedy Island and broke up. The vessel was bound from Sligo to Glasgow with a cargo of oats. The master and nine crew drowned. One man, James Fitzgerald managed to reach the island. The weather was too rough to allow a rescue boat to reach the island. The Coastguard from Rockstown, Urris managed to reach the island after two days when the survivor was rescued in an emaciated and exhausted state. In January 1845, a ship called the Harmony was shipwrecked after she hit the rocks around Glashedy island.

In February 1893, a group of young men took a trip out to the island but became stranded when the weather became stormy. After several hours, they attempted to leave the island, but the boat capsized, forcing them back to the safety of the island. Eventually, experienced boatmen led by Patrick Quigley from the Isle of Doagh managed to reach the island in the evening and rescued the beleaguered day-trippers.

During the 19th and early 20th century, the Island was used as a hide-out for making illegally distilled Poitin. In August 1900, Sergeant Gillespie and Sergeant Quinn of Royal Irish Constabulary and Mr Webber, the Station Master of the Malin head Coastguard mounted an expedition to the Island. They found several hundred gallons of "wash" - an intermediate input for Poitin. They also found a large quantity of distilling machinery in a cave which served a still-house. The cave was well stocked with fuel and provisions.

In the 1930s, the fishing grounds around the island were often the subject of poaching from foreign trawlers.

On occasions, the Island has been used to farm sheep. The surrounding waters have been used to fish for seals.

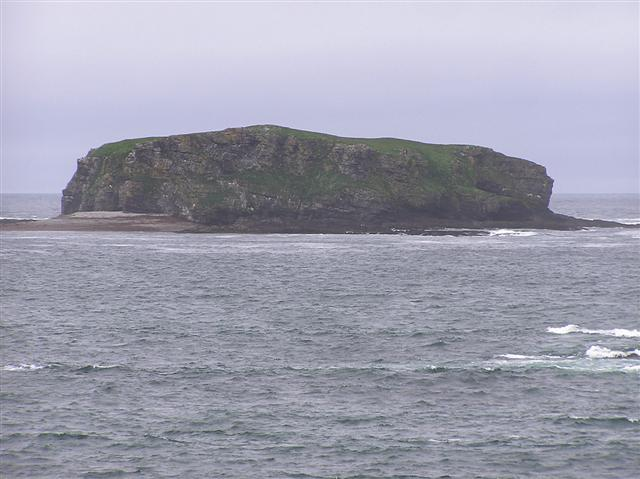
Various photos of Glashedy Island

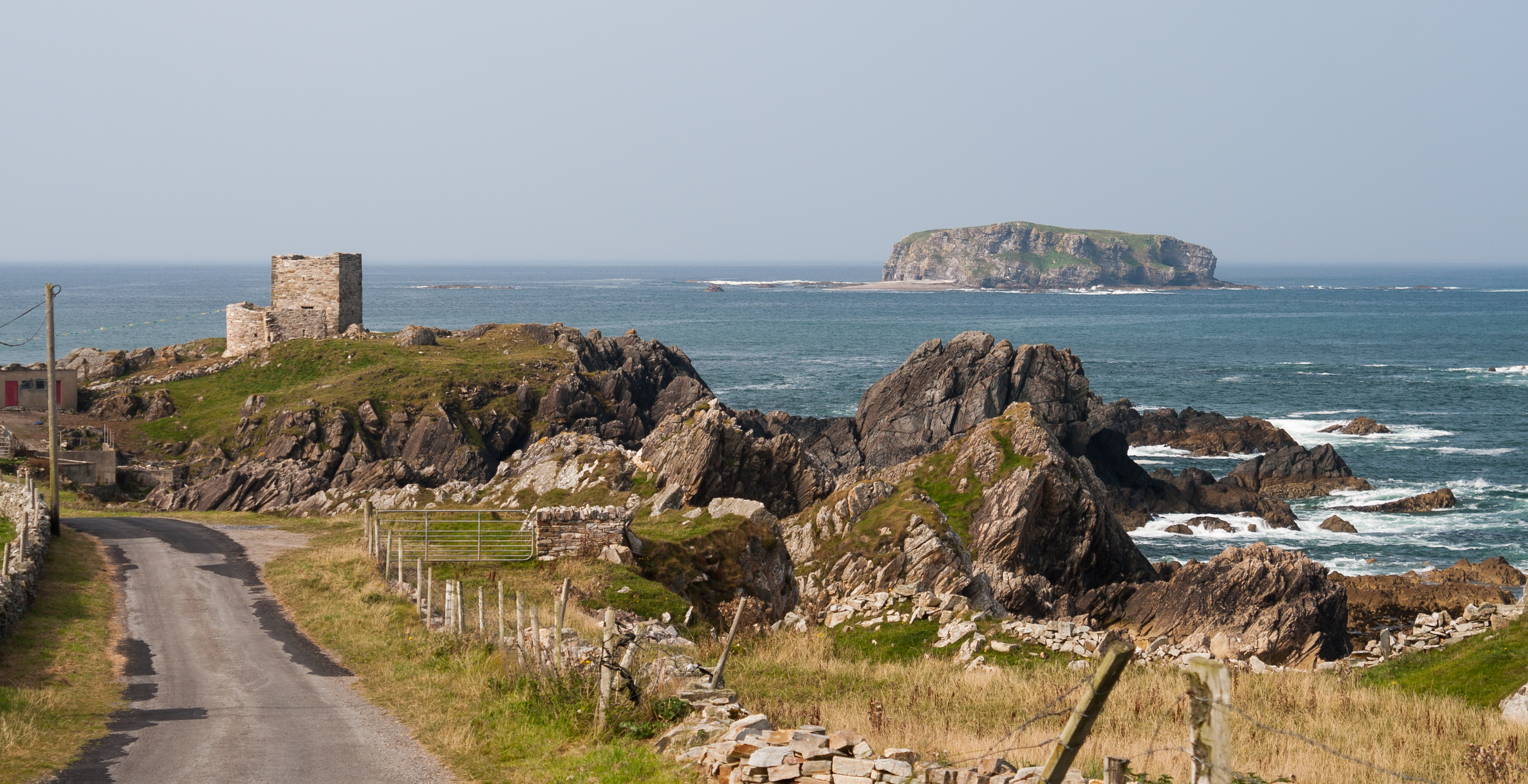

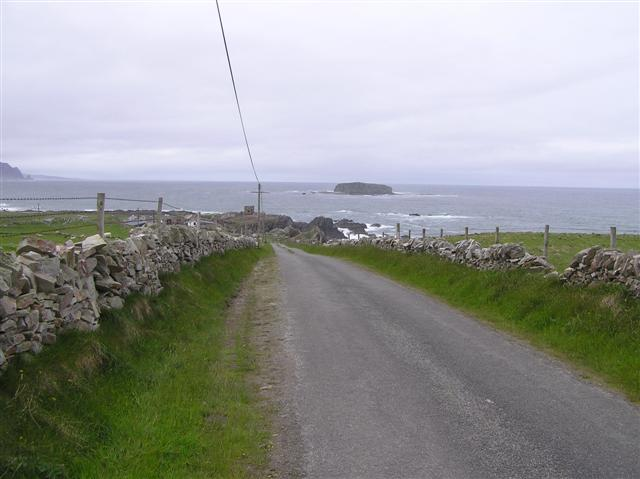

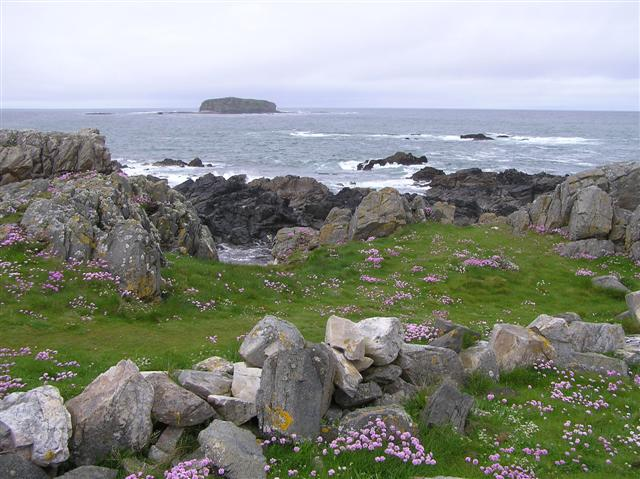

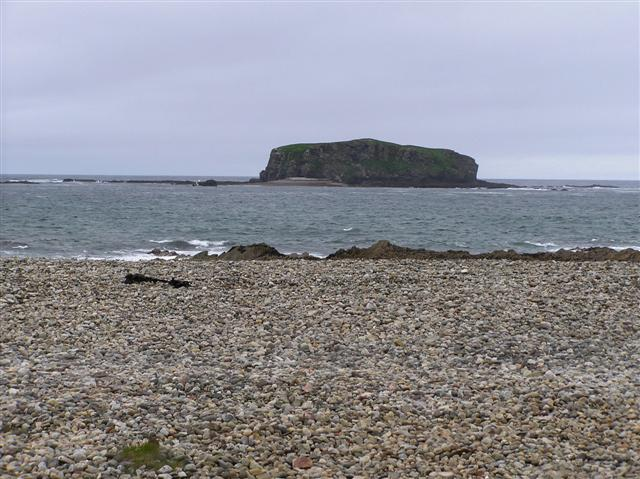

== Culture ==
The Island is referenced in the short story Soft Rain by Trisha McKinney, which was short-listed in the 2013 Bord Gais Energy Irish Book Awards. Glashedy was also the subject of a poem written by Danny O'Donnell. It is also the subject of a short film by Michael McLaughlin.

== Folklore ==
The island is the subject of a local legend. Between Glashedy Island and Pollen Strand, there is a "magic island" that appears once every seven years. If a mortal can throw some clay and hit the island, it will remain permanently above the water, and the mortal will gain possession of the island. However, if the mortal takes their eyes from the island while collecting the clay, the island will disappear again. So far, no one has yet "claimed" the island.
