= Inishowen West =

Barony in County Donegal, Ireland

Inishowen West Inis Eoghain Thiar (Irish)
- Barony
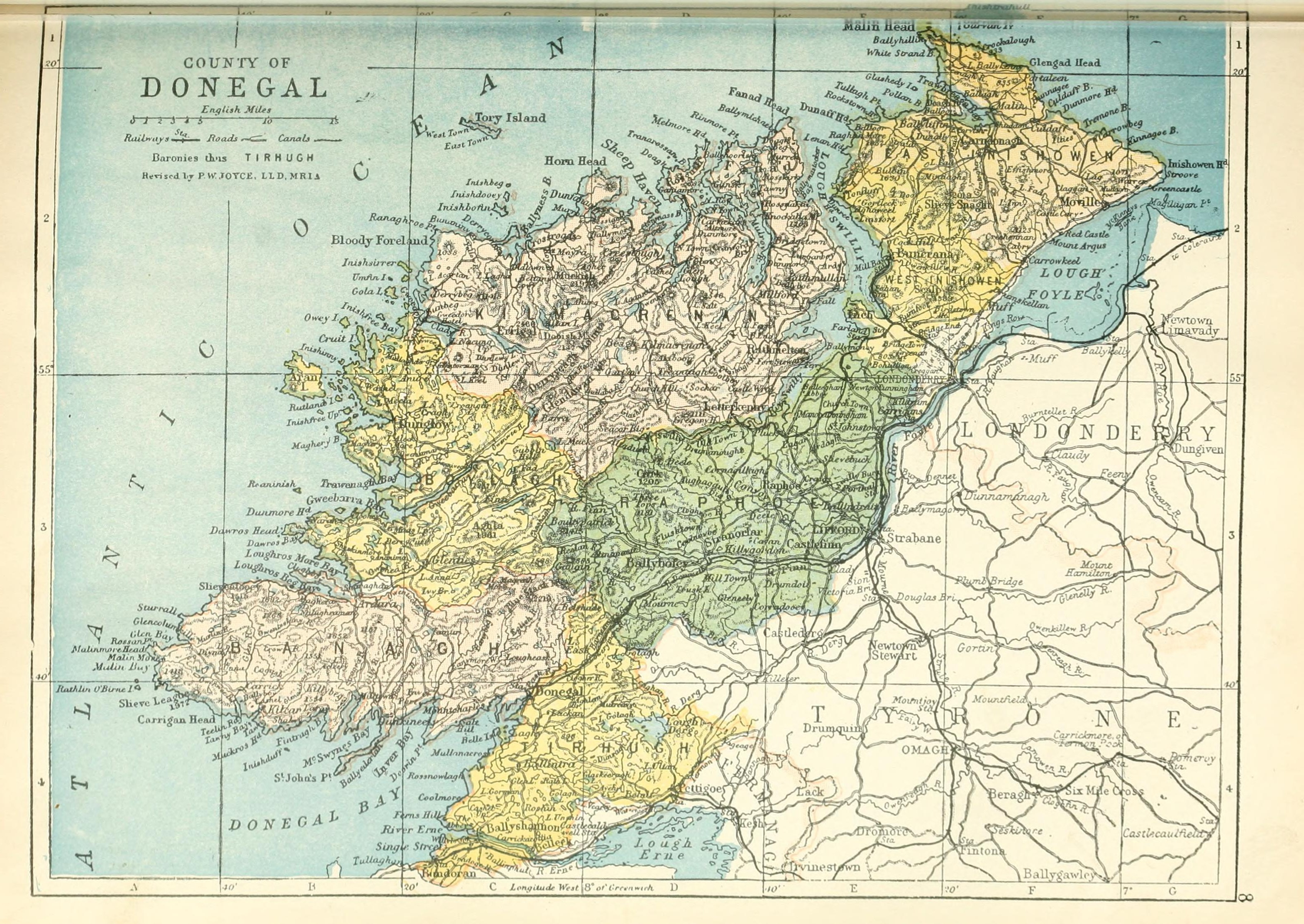
- Barony map of County Donegal, 1900; Inishowen West is in the northeast, coloured yellow.

- Location within Ireland
- Coordinates: 55°4′N 7°21′W
- Sovereign state: Ireland
- Province: Ulster
- County: Donegal

Area
  - Total: 310.91 km^{2} (120.04 sq mi)

Inishowen West (Irish: Inis Eoghain Thiar), also called West Inishowen or Innishowen West, is a barony in County Donegal, Ireland. Baronies were mainly cadastral rather than administrative units. They acquired modest local taxation and spending functions in the 19th century before being superseded by the Local Government (Ireland) Act 1898.

== Etymology ==
Inishowen West takes its name from Inishowen, in Irish Inis Eoghain, "Eoghan's island [peninsula]", referring to Eógan mac Néill, a semi-legendary king of the 5th century AD and ancestor of the Cenél nEógain dynasty.

== Geography ==
Inishowen West is located in the southwest of the Inishowen Peninsula.

== History ==
Between the 9th and 13th centuries, Inishowen was divided into three sectors, Aileach, Bredach and Cairrge Brachaidhe (Carraickabraghy) in the west. O'Mulhall (Mulfaal) and O'Hogain are cited as chiefs of Carrichbrack (Carrickbraghy). Inishowen was originally a single barony but was divided by 1851 into East and West.

== List of settlements ==
Below is a list of settlements in Inishowen West:

- Buncrana
- Bridgend
- Burnfoot
- Fahan
- Muff
