= Cairrge Brachaidhe =

Cairrge Brachaidhe, aka Carrickbraghy or Carrichbrack, was a Gaelic-Irish medieval territory located in Inishowen in present-day County Donegal, Ireland.

== Overview ==
Thought to have been named after, or by, Brachaidi mac Diarmata of the Cenél Fergusa (see List of Irish clans in Ulster), a clan who held the territory from the early medieval period. The family of Ó Maol Fábhail were its kings.

In the early modern era it was part of the barony of Inishowen West, in County Donegal.

== Cairrge Brachaidhe in the Irish annals ==
- 721: Snedgus Dearg Ua Brachaidhe, was slain in battle on the side of Aedh Allan, son of Fearghal, and the Cinel Eoghain.
- 834, Fearghus son of Badhbhchadh, lord of Carraig (Cairge or Cairrge) Brach Aidhe, was slain by the Munstermen.
- 857, Seghonnán, son of Conang, lord of Carraig Brachaidhe, died.
- 859, Sechonnan filius Conaing, rex Cairgi Brachaide, died.
- 878/81, Maelfabhaill, son of Loingseach, lord of Carraig Brachaighe (or Chairrge Brachaighe), died.
- 907, Ruarc, mac Maol Fabhaill, tighearna Cairrge Brachaidhe, died.
- 965/67, Tigernach mac Ruairc, ri Carce Brachaidhe, died.
- 1014, Cú Dubh, mac Maol Fabhaill, toiseach Cairrge Brachaighe was slain by the Síl Taidhg i m-Breghaibh.
- 1053, Flaithbhertach Ua Mael Fabhaill, tigherna Cairrcce Brachaidhe, died.
- 1065, Muircertach Ua Mael Fhabaill ri Cairce Brachaidhe was slain by the Ui Meithe Menna Tire.
- 1082, Gilla Crist Ua Mael Fhabaill ri Cairrce Brachaidhe, died.
- 1102, Sitricc Ua Maol Fabhaill tigherna Cairrge Brachaidhe.
- 1166, Aedh Ua Mael Fhabhaill, tigherna Cairrcce Brachaidhe, was slain by the son of Néll Uí Lochlainn.
- 1198, Cathalan O'Mulfavil, Lord of Carrick-Braghy, was slain by O'Dearan, who was himself slain immediately afterwards in revenge of him.
- 1199, Cathalan h-Ua Mael Fhabaill, ri Cairrgi Brachaidhe, was slain by d'O Deran.
