= Isle of Doagh =

Peninsula in County Donegal, Ireland

Coordinates: 55.301°N 7.344°W

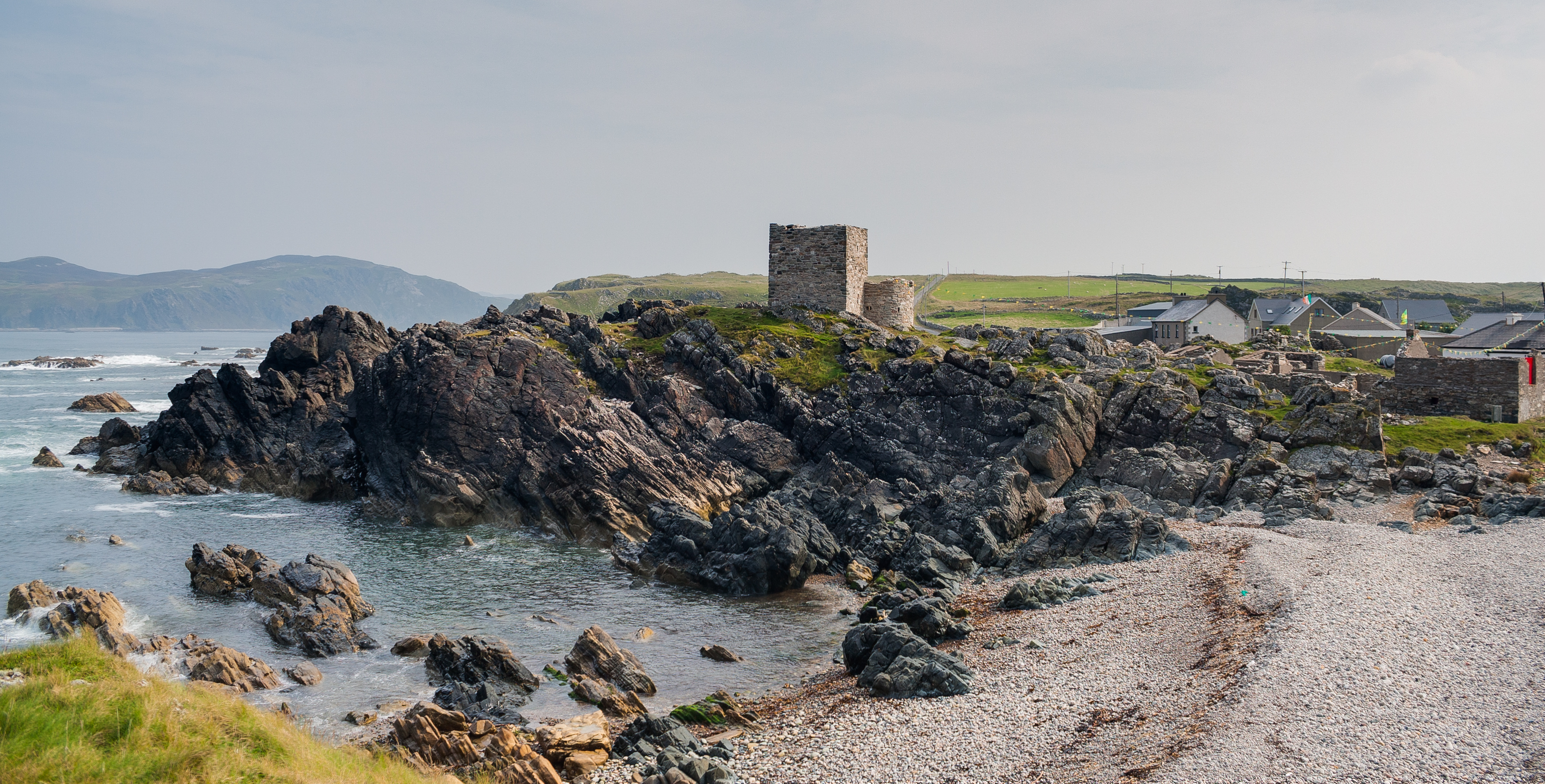
Carrickabraghy Castle

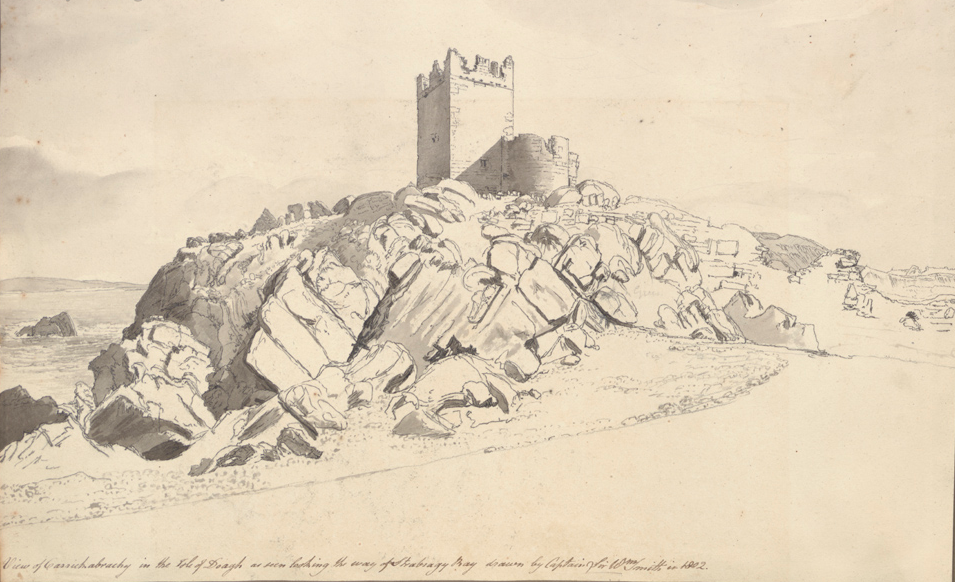
'View of Carrickbrachy in the Isle of Doagh as see looking the way of Traghbraga Bay drawn by Captain Sir Wm Smith in 1802'.

The Isle of Doagh (Irish: Oileán na Dumhcha, meaning "Isle of the Dune"; also known in English as Doagh Isle or Doagh Island) is a small peninsula in the north of Inishowen on the north coast of County Donegal in Ulster, Ireland. It once was an island. Over time, the channel between Doagh and the mainland silted up and it became joined to the mainland. Nevertheless, the area continued to be referred as the Isle of Doagh or Doagh Island. The area comprises five townlands; Ballymacmoriarty, Carrickabraghy, Carrowreagh, Fegart and Lagacurry. Doagh Island is very near the village of Ballyliffin.

The ruins of Carrickabraghy Castle stands at the north-western extremity of the peninsula.

== History ==
=== Neolithic period ===
The Isle of Doagh has one of the largest clusters of rock art sites in Ireland. The markings are around 4000–5000 years old.

=== Early medieval period ===
The Island was a stronghold of the Lords of Carraig Bhrachai who were part of the Ó Maolfabhail sept (anglicised McFall). There are numerous references to the inhabitants of the Isle of Doagh, in particular Carrickabraghy, in the Annals of the Four Masters. The earliest historical reference to Carrickabraghy is in 834, when Niall Caille led an army into Leinster. The Annals refer to one of his officers, Fearghas, son of Badhbhchadh, who was Lord of Carraig Bhrachai. According to the Annals, Fearghas was killed by Munster men during the campaign.

=== 17th and 18th centuries ===
Several townlands within the Isle of Doagh are mentioned in the 1665 Hearth money rolls: a tax levied on chimneys whose revenues were used to support the Royal Household. A total of 18 households paid the tax from "Lagacurry, Fegurt, Carickbracky, Carowreagh, and Ballym'Murty", of which 11 households carried the name of "O'Dougherty". In the 1654 Civil Survey, these townlands are also referred to as the property of The 1st Earl of Donegall (who also held the subsidiary title Viscount Chichester). The survey provided some limited information about economic activities in the area, which were the cultivation of oats, barley, wheat and rye. There was also some salmon and seal fishing.

=== 19th century shipwrecks ===
The coastline around the Isle of Doagh is notoriously hazardous for shipping and fishing. Throughout the 19th century, there were a number of maritime accidents nearby:

- On 24 November 1841, a schooner, the James Cook, struck some rocks near Glashedy Island and broke up. The master and nine crew drowned.
- On the morning of 22 April 1847, seven fishermen from the Isle of Doagh were drowned. In relatively calm weather, their boat capsized while crossing the Bay of Strabega after it was hit by a sudden swell. The dead were Donald Doherty, owner of the boat, who left a wife and six children; Patrick Doherty, who left a wife and three children; James McLoughlin (or McLaughlin), a wife and four children; Patrick (Roe) Doherty, a wife and one child; William Doherty, a young unmarried man; Hugh McCool, who was unmarried; and John McLoughlin (or McLaughlin), a widow's son, and her only support. William Doherty, the eighth person on board, escaped by swimming ashore.
- In March 1878, a large barque called the Danube ran aground on the Isle during a severe storm. It was sailing from Liverpool to New York. It lost its masts and began to drift aimlessly. Two coastguards from Malin Head put out in a small boat and reached the vessel. The rescue craft was hit by a huge wave, and one of the coastguards was drowned. Subsequently, a line was floated ashore by means of a barrel, and the crew, twelve in number, were hauled ashore safely.
- In September 1847, a brig heading for Greenock ran around on the Isle of Doagh.

=== The Irish Famine ===
The potato blight and the subsequent famine devastated the Isle of Doagh. Despite the obvious hardship caused by the failure of the potato crop, landlords continued to evict tenants. In May 1848, the Weekly Vindicator Newspaper reported that a large contingent of police and bailiffs entered the Isle of Doagh and evicted between 20 and 30 families. Tenants had been previously confronted with a doubling of their rents.

In June 1848, the Belfast Vindicator reported that in Feggart, Isle of Doagh 53 people had died of hunger. Moreover, the newspaper provided a list of the victims; James McLoughlin, his wife and three children; Owen McLoughlin, and his six children; "Widow" Diver, and her two sons; Patrick Doherty and his wife; "Widow" Doherty and her two children; Patrick James Doherty, his wife, and three children; "Widow: McCoal and five children; Charles McLoughlin, his wife, and three children; Neal Doherty, his wife, and four children; Patrick, Daniel, Nancy, and Catherine Doherty; William McRory, his wife and five children.

=== Rural unrest ===
The Land League, which campaigned for agrarian reform, was active on the Isle. In 1880, John Mooney, a process-server, was attacked by a large crowd while he was serving a writ for a debt. Mooney took refuge in the local school but was forced out and made to swear on his knees that he would never serve any writs again. Five local men were subsequently arrested and tried at Carndonagh Magistrates. However, the men were acquitted after Mooney, the school master and other witnesses refused to identify the men as assailants.

=== Poitín production ===
Poitín is a traditional Irish homemade spirit. It has a long history in North Inishowen and was often made illicitly due to its prohibition. It is typically produced using ingredients such as grains or potatoes, which were usually relatively abundant on the island. During the 19th century and early 20th century, poitín was a major source of income in the area. It was also the subject of suppression by the authorities.

In April 1898, the Royal Irish Constabulary (R.I.C.) conducted a mass raid on homes on the Isle and found illegally distilled spirits in several locations. Prosecutions of local inhabitants for illegal distillation were commonplace. For example, in August 1878, the home of a widow called Mary McGeoghegan, from Maheranoll, Isle of Doagh, was raided by the R.I.C. The constabulary found a jar containing one gallon and a half of illicit spirits concealed in her potato garden at the rear of her house. Opposite her kitchen door, they found a still that had been used for illicit distillation. A month later, at the Malin Petty Sessions, she was fined £6.

The 1920s and 1930s were a particularly active period of poitín production in the area, with the newly established Civic Guards actively trying to suppress distillation. In October 1924, Miss Cassie Doherty from Figart, Isle of Doagh was charged with the possession of illicit spirits. In October 1925, James Doherty was charged with hiding wash and poitín on his Isle of Doagh farm. He was sentenced to two months' hard labour and fined £50, later replaced with one month's imprisonment. In March 1926, Civic Guards found stills and barrels containing wash concealed in the sand hills. Additionally, the barrel of wash contained an unusual admixture of a quantity of turnips.

In October 1927, the Guards carried out significant operations targeting illegal poitín production on the Isle of Doagh. While patrolling the area, the Guards noticed smoke rising from the beach and proceeded to investigate. They stumbled upon a fire and two individuals rowing the boat, which clearly carried a still. The distillers attempted to flee, rowing the boat across the bay in an attempt to evade capture. However, the Guards pursued them, leading to a chase that concluded near the border of Clonmany and Carndonagh districts. The Guards managed to secure the boat and its illicit cargo, successfully apprehending the suspects and removing the still from the vessel. In a separate but related incident, the Guards seized another boat originating from the Isle of Doagh. This operation led to the arrest of one individual involved in the illegal poitín trade. Additionally, several barrels of poitín were confiscated during this intervention.

=== Second World War ===
In February 1941, a mine washed up on a local beach. It was detonated by Irish Army troops stationed at Fort Lenan. The explosion shook houses up to ten miles away.

== Places of interest ==
- Carrickabraghy Castle - Also known as Doherty's Castle, is situated on the westernmost point of the Isle of Doagh. Constructed in the late 16th century, the castle stands on Friar's Rock, a large rock formation. It features an oval bawn, seven circular towers, and a central keep. The castle's walls are approximately 3 feet 9 inches wide. The castle was last inhabited in 1665 and is known for its strategic location overlooking the seashore. The architectural elements, such as gun-loops and wall-presses, showcase its defensive nature.

- Doagh Famine Village - In Lagacurry, a collection of traditional Irish houses have been transformed into a folk museum. The museum illustrates community living from the mid-19th century times right up to the present day. It was badly damaged by fire in May 2025.
- Glashedy Island - (Irish: Glaiséidí) is a rock island approximately 3 kilometres (2 mi) west of the Isle of Doagh. It is currently uninhabited. Its former name until the early 19th century was Seale Island. At various times, the Island has been used to farm sheep. The 1654 Civil Survey indicates that the Island was also used as a base for seal fishing.

== Notable people ==
- Stephen McLaughlin (born 1990), footballer
