= Raghtin More =

Mountain in Ireland

- Reachtain Mhór
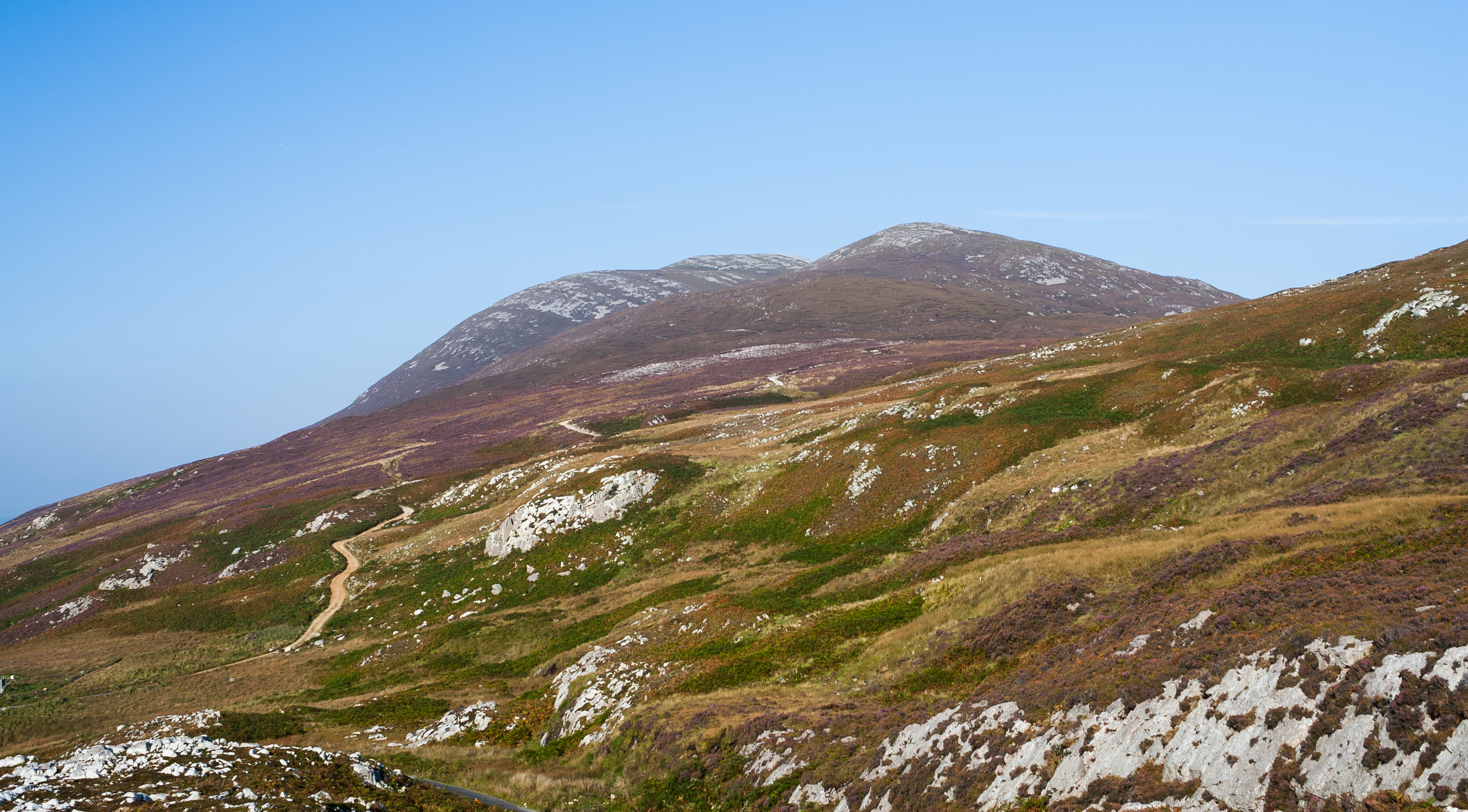
- Raghtin More (left) as seen from Mamore Gap

Highest point
- Elevation: 502 m (1,647 ft)
- Prominence: 407 m (1,335 ft)
- Listing: Marilyn
- Coordinates: 55°12′21.24″N 7°28′1.2″W

Naming
- Language of name: Irish

Geography
- Location within Ireland
- Location: Inishowen, County Donegal, Ireland
- OSI/OSNI grid: C339455

Geology
- Mountain type: mainly of quartzite

Climbing
- Easiest route: from Mamore Gap

Raghtin More (Irish: Reachtain Mhór) or Slieve Keeroge is a mountain with a height of 502 metres (1,647 ft) in Inishowen, County Donegal, Ireland. There is a megalithic cairn on its summit, which can be climbed from Mamore Gap. From the summit there is a view of Lough Swilly and the coast stretching to Malin Head.

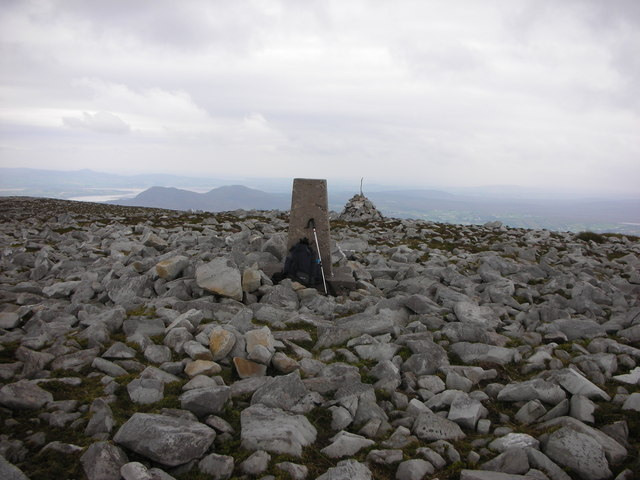
Triangulation pillar on the summit
