= Dunree =

Dunree An Dún Riabhach
- Townland
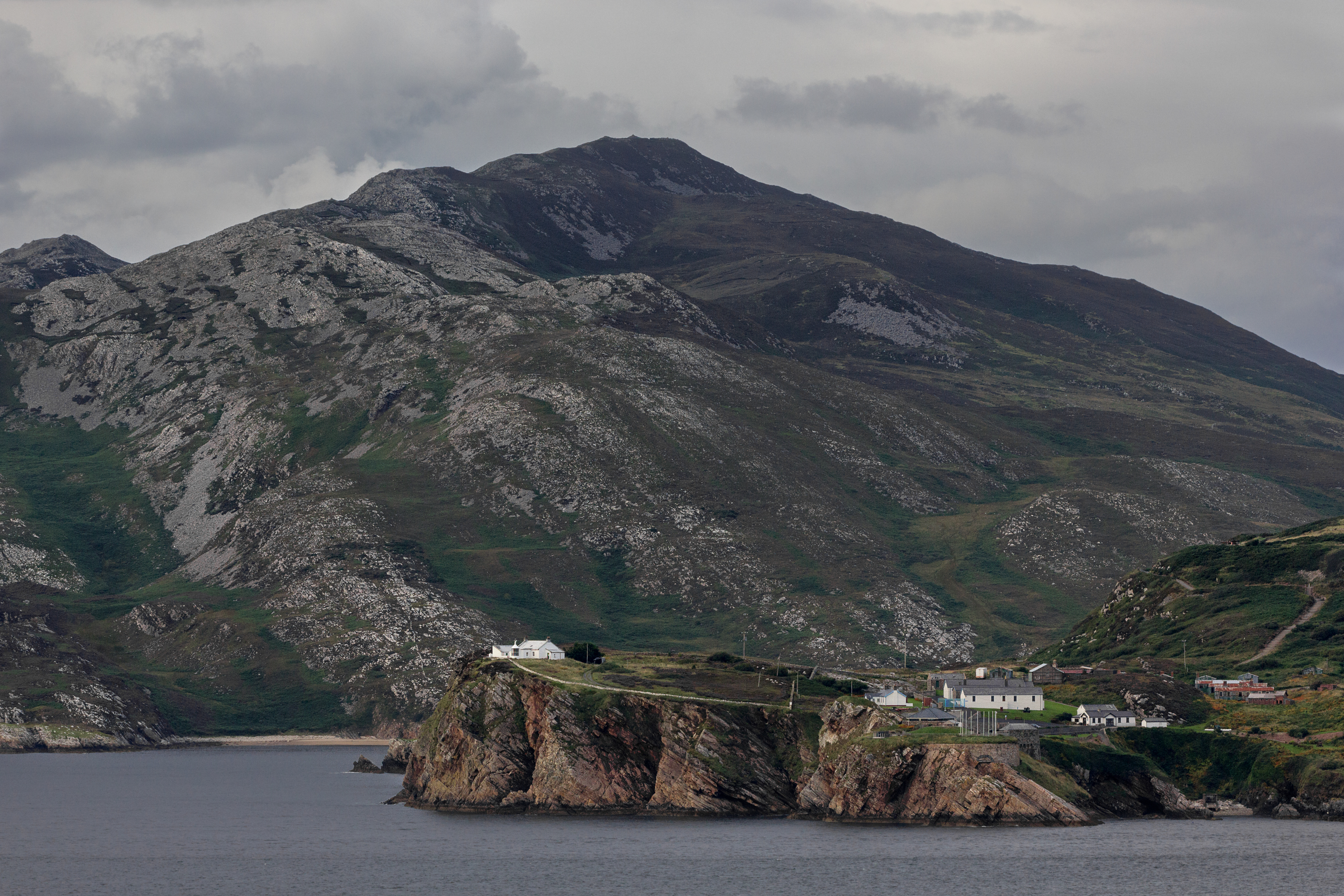
- Dunree Head and lighthouse

- Location in Ireland
- Coordinates: 55°11′49″N 7°32′53″W
- Country: Ireland
- Province: Ulster
- County: County Donegal

Area
  - Total: 0.87 km^{2} (0.34 sq mi)
- Time zone: UTC+0 (WET)
  - Summer (DST): UTC-1 (IST (WEST))
- Irish Grid Reference: C287390

Dunree (Irish: An Dún Riabhach, meaning 'grey (or streaked) fort') is a townland in north-west Inishowen, in County Donegal, Ireland. Part of the civil parish of Desertegney, the townland has an area of approximately 0.8 square kilometres (0.3 sq mi), and had a population of 33 people as of the 2011 census.

The area, which lies on the shore of Lough Swilly, has a number of tourist attractions such as Dunree Beach, Dunree Lighthouse (which was built in the 1870s), and Fort Dunree. Fort Dunree is a military museum located on Dunree Head about seven miles north of Buncrana. The museum houses a display of military memorabilia and artefacts as well as several large guns from the twentieth century. Next to the fort is Dunree Beach, which tourists and visitors use for parking.
