= Ó Maol Fábhail =

Ó Maol Fábhail, anglicised as Lavelle is an Irish surname. It can also be found as O'Mullawill, or rarely, as Mulfall or Mac Fall.

== Lavelle of Connacht ==
The surname Lavelle is found mainly in Connacht, particularly in County Mayo, where Griffith's Valuation of 1857 recorded 286 Lavelle households. Many were located on Achill Island. It is found sparsely elsewhere in Ireland.

The Lavelles of Mayo and elsewhere in Connacht are believed by MacLysaght to be descendants of the clan Ó Maol Fábhail, a surname phonetically anglicised as Lavelle.

On page 370 of Ruaidhrí Ó Flaithbheartaigh's Iar Connacht, James Hardiman quotes the manuscript called Crichaireacht cinedach nduchasa Muintiri Murchada, which states that O'Maelampaill of Donaghpatrick is the brehon of O'Flaherty. Hardiman notes concerning this family states:

- O'Maelampaill. This name is written Ó Maol Fábhail in Dubhaltach Mac Fhirbhisigh's copy of this tract. The name is still extant, but pronounced O'Mullawill, and sometimes anglicised Lavelle. According to the tradition in the barony of Murrisk, or Iar-Umhall (Umaill) this family is of Danish descent, but this tradition does not appear to be entitled to much credit.

Of Donaghpatrick, Hardiman states:

- Donaghpatrick, Domnaig Padraig, i.e., of St. Patrick's church. This is the name of a parish in the north of the barony of Clare. Its original church stands in ruins near the margin of Lough Hackett, which is the Loch Cime of the old Irish writers. (p. 370) The parish of Donaghpatrick is between the towns of Headford and Tuam.

The surname derived from the Gaelic personal name, Maol Fábhail, its form denoting descent from a person named in honour of a Saint Fábhail. Nineteen persons of the name are cited by Nollaig Ó Muraíle (pp. 479–480, volume V Leabhar na nGenealach) but none seem to have been saints. Elsewhere, (pp. 450–451, volume I) he has them as Ui Mhaoil Fhábhaill (or Maoil Ampuill). Based upon a variant manuscript of Crichaireacht cinedach nduchasa Muintiri Murchada, it also cites the family as the brehons or judges of the clan Ó Flaithbheartaigh, c. 1100.

== Lavelle of Armagh ==
The Annals of Inisfallen record that in 1102,

The son of Mac Lochlainn with the Cenél Eógain went into Ulaid, and their camp was attacked when unguarded, and the king of Carraig Brachide, namely, Ua Maíl Fhábaill, and the son of Conrach, son of Eógan, and many others were slain.

Twelve Lavelle households were recorded by the same survey in County Armagh. However, though the forms O'Lawell, O'Lowell and O'Lavell are recorded in the 17th-century Hearth Money Rolls for Armagh, they are believed to be unrelated to the Connacht family (Mac Lysaght p. 144, 1996).

== Mulfall of Donegal ==
This is a rare form of the surname Mulfall, the original form of which is also Ó Maol Fábhail, but "is of different and distinct origin, being that of a family who descended from Fergus, grandson of Niall of the Nine Hostages and were chiefs of Carrickbraghy, in the barony of Inishowen. There, however, it has been widely corrupted to MacFael, MacFall and even MacPaul and Paul." He goes on to note that this makes it indistinguishable from the family of Mac Fall of Antrim (p. 144, 1996).

The family would thus descend from Fergus Cendfota, son of Conall Gulban. Fergus's grandson, Ainmuire mac Sétnai, was King of Tara at his death in 569 (see Cenél Conaill family tree). The eponym, Maol Fábhail, lived in the mid-9th century, and the surname not come into use till the time of his grandsons or great-grandsons, some one hundred years later (i.e., mid-to-late 10th/early 11th century. He is identified as Maol Fábhail mac Loingseach in the following note from the Annals of Ulster:

- 878/81: Maelfabhaill, son of Loingseach, lord of Carraig Brachaighe (or Chairrge Brachaighe), died.

The Annals of Inisfallen, sub anno 1102, record that The son of Mac Lochlainn with the Cenél Eógain went into Ulaid, and their camp was attacked when unguarded, and the king of Carraig Brachide, namely, Ua Maíl Fhábaill, and the son of Conrach, son of Eógan, and many others were slain.

== Mac Fall of Antrim ==
Writing of this family, Mac Lysaght states:

- "Mac Fall (MacPhail and MacPhoil) which I think is of Scottish and Clan MacPhail origin. O'Mulfoyle is listed in the 1659 'census' as a principal Irish surname in the barony of Tirkeerran, which is contiguous to Inishown."

Thus it is confused with Mulfall of Donegal (see above). "The most distinguished of the name was Dr. James Augustine MacFaul (1850–1917), Bishop of Trenton, protagonist of Irish Catholic causes in USA"

== Ua Maíl Fhábaill of Muscraige ==
Still another family of the name was located in Munster:

- AI1208.3 Ua Maíl Fhábaill of Muscraige was slain by Mac na Sethar Ua B[...] through enmity.

== Meaning of the name ==
The Irish meaning of the name Lavelle or O'Maolfhábhail 'descendant of Maolfhábhail', a personal name meaning 'fond of movement or travel'.

The French meaning of the name comes from the common French place name Laval, from Old French val 'valley'. This is also a Huguenot name (with the same etymology), taken to England by Etienne-Abel Laval, a minister of the French church in Castle Street, London, around 1730.French: habitational name from Lavelle in Puy-de-Dôme or various other, smaller places so named

== Variations ==
Variations include Lawell, Melville, Mulville and MacFaul, though these are generally reckoned as separate, unrelated surnames.

Lavelle is found in France and Belgium as a surname but, being derived from a placename, has a different and unrelated origin to the Irish surname. Examples include

- Velle-le-Châtel
- Velles, Haute-Marne
- Velles, Indre

French people bearing the surname include:

- Louis Lavelle, philosopher, 1883–1951.

In Spain, it is derived from placenames such as La Vellés.

== Other forms ==
As LaVelle, La Velle, and LaVella, it is found as a forename in the USA.

== People with the surname ==
Notable Lavelles include:

- Patrick Lavelle, priest and Irish nationalist, 1825–1886
- John Daniel Lavelle, United States Air Force general, 1916–1979
- John W. Lavelle, Democratic Party representative in New York, 1949–2007
- Caroline Lavelle, British singer-songwriter and cellist, born 1969
- James Lavelle, DJ, electronic recording artist and record label boss, born 1974
- Peter Lavelle, writer and RT broadcaster, born 1961
- Rose Lavelle, professional soccer player for United States women's national soccer team and OL Reign, born 1995
- Gary Lavelle, professional baseball pitcher for San Francisco Giants, Toronto Blue Jays and the Oakland A's born 3 January 1949

== See also ==
- Irish name
- Maigh Seóla
- Connacht
