= Ballyliffin =

Village in County Donegal, Ireland

Ballyliffin Baile Lifín
- Village
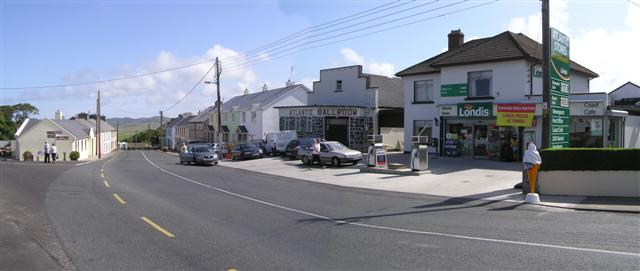

- Location in Ireland
- Coordinates: 55°16′40″N 7°23′40″W
- Country: Ireland
- Province: Ulster
- County: County Donegal

Population (2022)
  - Total: 479
- Time zone: UTC+0 (WET)
  - Summer (DST): UTC-1 (IST (WEST))
- Irish Grid Reference: C467453
- Website: visitballyliffin.com

Ballyliffin (Irish: Baile Lifín) is a village on the R238 road near the north coast of the Inishowen peninsula in County Donegal, Ireland.

The surrounding landscape includes Pollan Strand, Binion Hill and Crockaughrim hill.

== History ==
Local history of the area is covered in Charles McGlinchey's publication, ‘The Last of the Name’. It includes accounts of feuds between landlords and tenants, battles and other nuances.

== Places of interest ==
A small island off Pollan Bay called Glashedy is located roughly one mile off the coast. The English translation of the name is the Island of the Green Cloak derived from the layer of grass present on the top. Throughout the ages various ships have become wrecked near to the island, which provide rich fishing grounds and also contributed the rat population to the island.

Isle of Doagh is also nearby, though no longer separate from the mainland.

== Transport ==
Ballyliffin railway station opened on 1 July 1901, but finally closed on 2 December 1935. It is now a private residence.

== Sport ==
Ballyliffin also has two 18 hole golf courses. Among Nick Faldo's favourite links courses, they were designed by course designers, Eddie Hackett, Pat Ruddy and Tom Craddoc. In 2006 the old course was upgraded by Nick Faldo. Ballyliffin Golf Club hosted the 2008 Irish Seniors Open in June 2008. Ballyliffin Golf Club was the venue for the 2018 Irish Open, which was won by Russell Knox.

== People ==
- John Toland (1670–1722) philosopher and "heretic" who coined the ideals of Pantheism was born in Ballyliffin.

== See also ==
- List of populated places in Ireland
