= Ní Dochartaigh =

Ní Dochartaigh is a surname. Notable people with the surname include:

- Kerri ní Dochartaigh (born 1983), Northern Irish writer
- Fionnghuala Ní Dochartaigh (died 1440), listed bearer of the name Fionnghuala
