= Carrickabraghy Castle =

Ruined fortification and townland in County Donegal, Ireland

Carrickabraghy Castle Caisleán Charraig Bhrachaí
- Townland
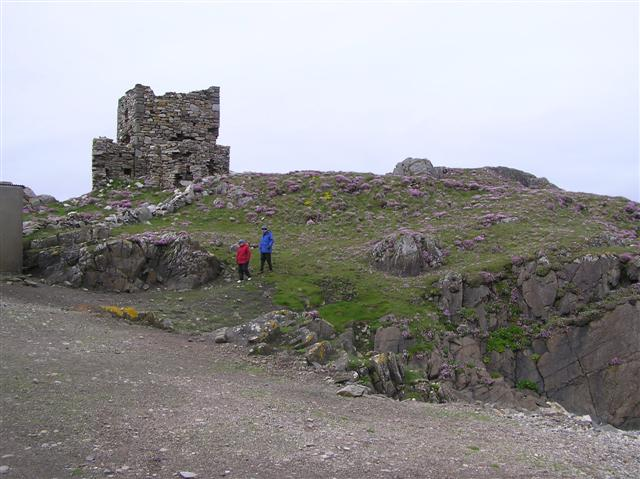
- Carrickabraghy Castle, before restoration

- Location in Ireland
- Coordinates: 55.316329°N 7.372674°W
- Country: Ireland
- Province: Ulster
- County: County Donegal
- Time zone: UTC+0 (WET)
  - Summer (DST): UTC-1 (IST (WEST))
- Irish Grid Reference: C398523

Carrickabraghy Castle (Irish: Caisleán Charraig Bhrachaí stands in the townland of Carrickabraghy meaning "Friars Rock" in Irish) on a rocky outcrop at the north-western extremity of the Isle of Doagh, at the head of Pollan Bay, in the north of Inishowen, a peninsula on the north coast of County Donegal, Ireland. The townland and its castle are located in the Parish of Clonmany in the Barony of Inishowen East. Known as 'The Castles', the site is of local historical importance.

== Name ==
Whilst it is accepted that the Irish word 'Carraig' means rock, there is some debate as to the meaning of 'Bhrachai'. It is thought the word could be a personal name, as it is mentioned in the pre-Norman genealogy of the Cineal Fhearghasa, and could be an ancestor of the McFall sept. Machtochair, in his book Inishowen, Its History, Traditions and Antiquities says Carraig Bhrachai means 'The Friars Rock'.

== History ==
From the ninth to the thirteenth century Inishowen was politically divided into three 'tuatha' or districts. These were known as Aileach in the south, Bredach to the east and Carraig Bhrachai to the west. The Lords of Carraig Bhrachai were the Ó Maolfabhail sept (anglicised McFall, MacFael, MacFall, MacPaul, and Paul), who were descended from Cineal Fhearghasa, a branch of Cineal Eoghain. They ruled from the townland of Carrickabraghy, the area where the Castle now stands. They were one of the most important families in Inishowen.

The earliest historical mention of Carrickabraghy comes in The Annals of the Four Masters;

In 834 The monarch Niall Caille led an army into Leinster; one of his officers, Fearghas, son of Badhbhchadh, lord of Carraig Bhrachai, was killed by Munstermen.

In 857 Sechonnan, son of Conaing, king of Carraig Bhrachai, died.

In 878 Maolfabhail, son of Loingseach, lord of Carraig Bhrachai, died.

In 907 Ruarc, son of Maolfabhail, lord of Carraig Bhrachai, died.

In 915 in a battle between the Irish and foreigners – Danes or Norse – the chief of Carraig Bhrachai was slain.

In 965 Tiarnach, son of Ruarc, lord of Carraig Bhrachai, died.

In 1014 Cu Dubh, son of Maolfabhail, chief of Carraig Bhrachai, was slain by the race of Tadhg Breagha.

In 1053 Flaitheartach O Maolfabhail, lord of Carraig Bhrachai, died.

In 1065 Muireartach O Maolfabhail, king of Carraig Bhrachai, was killed by the Ui Meith of Menna Tire.

In 1082 Giolla Chriost O Maolfabhail, king of Carraig Bhrachai, was slain.

In 1102 An army was led by Cineal Eoghain to Maigh Cobha. The Ulidians entered their unguarded camp by night and killed a number, among whom was the king of Carraig Bhrachai, Sitric O Maolfabhail.

In 1166 Aodh O Maolfabhail, king of Carraig Bhrachai, was treacherously killed by Muireartach, son of Niall Mac Lochlainn.

In 1199 Cathalan O Maolfabhail, king of Carraig Bhrachai, was killed by O Dearain [no particulars], who was slain in revenge immediately afterwards by adherents of Cathalan.

In 1215 Trad O Maolfabhail, chief of Cineal Fhearghasa, his brothers and a great number of people were slain in Dumbartonshire in Scotland by Muireadach, the chief steward of Lennox. The particulars of the conflict are not given.

At this point all reference to the Lords of Carriag Brachai ceases.

It is striking to see that the Lords of Carrickabraghy were important enough to be included in this book of Irish History over such a long period of time. They were heavily involved in medieval conflicts and were considered important military officers in these battles, fighting alongside kings, and taking to battle across the seas.

Seán Beattie, in his book Ancient Monuments of Inishowen, recounts a tale regarding a Viking raid on Donegal in the tenth century. Three princesses were taken as hostages during the raid. One of the princesses escaped and took plundered treasure with her. She came ashore at Carrickabraghy and married a local chief.

Throughout the period of Viking invasion in Inishowen the McFall sept maintained their control over Carrickabraghy.

Carraig Bhrachai is not mentioned again in the history books until 1600. The present remains of The Castle are thought to have been built around this time. The O Dochartaigh Clan had risen into power in Inishowen and the Chief of the clan and Lord of Inishowen was Sean Og O Dochartaigh. The English invasion of Ireland was well underway, and to protect his livestock and supplies from English raids, Sean Og decided the best place to store them was on The Isle of Doagh with his kinsman, The Lord of Carraig Bhrachai, Feilimi Brasleach O Dochartaigh. There was good reason for this as The Isle of Doagh was unfamiliar territory to the English and was easily defended as it was only accessible at low tide.

Sean Og O Dochartaigh died suddenly in 1601 and his successor as Lord of Inishowen had not yet been decided. The natural choice, his first-born son, Cathaoir Rua, had not yet come of age, and there were other forces at work wanting their own man installed. Aodh Rua O Donaill, the Lord of Tir Chonaill, wanted an experienced and mature man at the helm, someone who would remain loyal to him, effectively keeping the peninsula and its resources under his control. That man was Feilim Og, Sean Og's half-brother. The English commander in Derry, Sir Henry Dowcra, was not bothered who the successor was as long as they were ready to submit himself and the territory to the Queen. Aodh Bui Mac Daibheid wanted the young Cathaoir as his successor. Aodh Rua O Donaill prevailed and Feilim Og was inaugurated in February 1601. His reign, however, was to be short lived. Aodh Bui Mac Daibheid, though cunning negotiations with both Dowcra and O Donaill, had Cathaoir Rua O Dochartaigh rightfully installed as Lord of Inishowen in May 1601. He was just 14 years old, and he was to be the last of the great Irish Lords.

Ireland at this time was very fragmented, with feuds and arguments happening between different clans. The English were seen as just another enemy, and the rulers of the clans were interested only in keeping hold of their own lands.

Aodh Rua O Donaill mobilised his army in May 1601 to attack Aodh Bui Mac Daibheid who was in alliance with the English. The reasons he did so are unclear. Maybe he thought he was being double-crossed when he agreed to install Cathaoir Rua as Lord of Inishowen. The battle took place on the sand plain at Pollan on The Isle of Doagh, not far from Carrickabraghy Castle. Aodh Rua O Donaill and his forces were beaten. Machtochair says 'The battle was bloody; the loss was terrible'.

Although Cathaoir Rua, or Cahir Roe was Lord of Inishowen from 1601, he did not take full control until he turned 18 in 1605. His rule was a peaceful one until The Flight of The Earls in 1607. The English became suspicious the Earls would return with forces from Spain to reclaim their lands, and thought Cathaoir Rua had a part to play in this plan. In the autumn of 1607, Cathaoir Rua went to chop wood at Kilmacrennan for building purposes. English spies reported this as Cathaoir Rua mobilising for a rebellion. Cathaoir heard of these English suspicions and sensed danger. He went into hiding at Carraig Bhrachai Castle. From here he planned the famous rebellion that would end in his death in 1608, the last lord of Inishowen.

Around 1665 Carrickabraghy Castle was abandoned and began to decline for several centuries.

A grant from the National Rural Development LEADER Programme and over €30,000 from local fundraising events and contributions from supporters allowed the first phase of the work of conservation to be completed in December 2013.
