= Civil Survey =

The Civil Survey was a cadastral survey of landholdings in Ireland carried out in 1654–1656. It was separate from the Down Survey, which began while the Civil Survey was in progress, and made use of Civil Survey data to guide its progress. Whereas the Down Survey was a cartographic survey based on measurements in the field, the Civil Survey was an inquisition which visited each barony and took depositions from landholders based on parish and townland, with written descriptions of their boundaries. The Civil Survey covered 27 of Ireland's 32 counties, excluding 5 counties in Connacht which had been covered in the 1630s by the Strafford survey commissioned by Thomas Wentworth, 1st Earl of Strafford. The original Civil Survey records were destroyed by fire in 1711, but a set of copies for 10 counties was discovered in the 19th century.

== Sources ==
- Irish Manuscripts Commission, Digital Editions: The Civil Survey AD 1654–56 (10 vols, ed. Robert C. Simington, 1931–61)
- 1 Tipperary (eastern and southern baronies)
- 2 Tipperary (western and northern baronies; crown and church lands)
- 3 Donegal; Londonderry; Tyrone
- 4 Limerick; Kerry (part of Clanmaurice)
- 5 Meath
- 6 Waterford; Cork (Muskerry); Kilkenny (City and liberties)
- 7 Dublin
- 8 Kildare
- 9 Wexford
- 10 Miscellanea including a map showing changes to the county and barony boundaries since the Civil Survey
