= Inishowen =

Large peninsula in County Donegal, Ireland

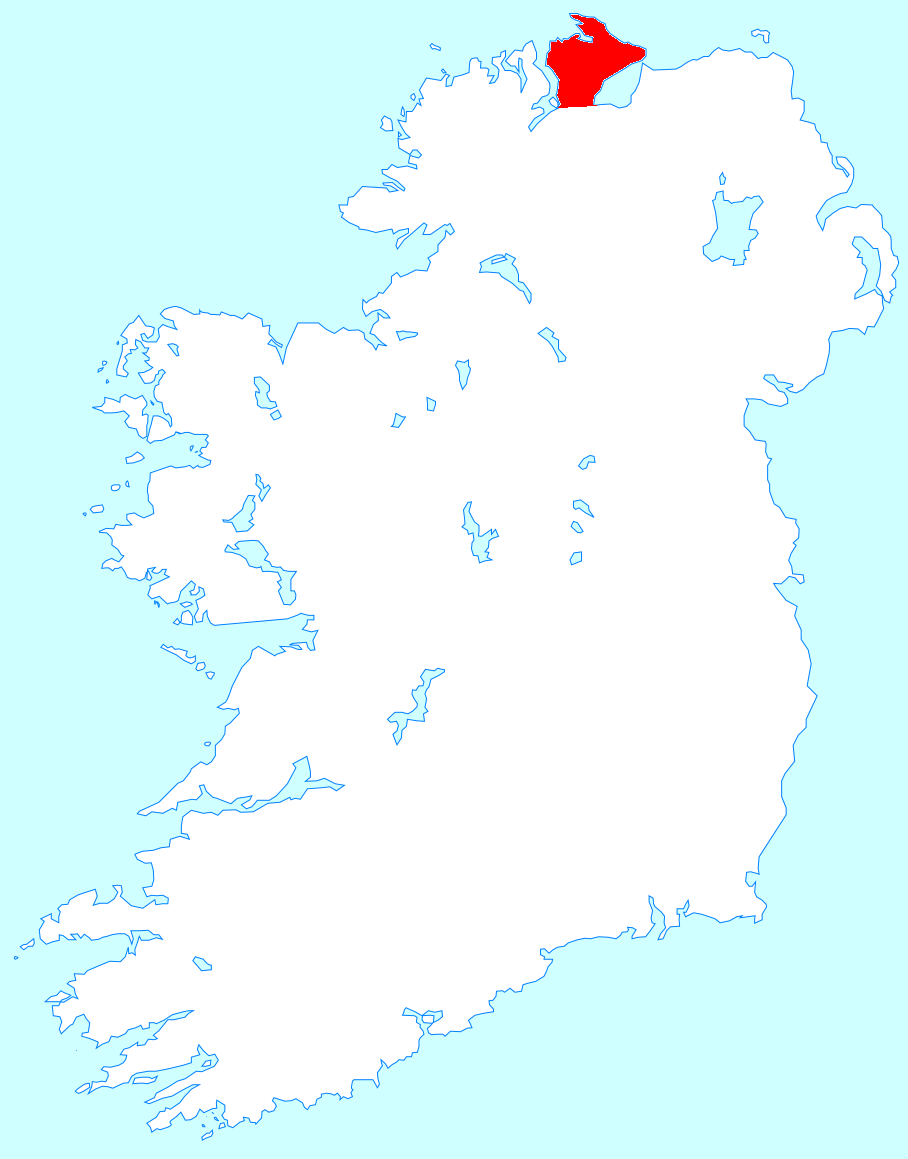
Location of Inishowen (in red)

Inishowen (Irish: Inis Eoghain, meaning 'island of Eoghan') is a peninsula in the north of County Donegal in Ireland. Inishowen is the most northerly peninsula on the island of Ireland.

The Inishowen peninsula includes Ireland's most northerly point, Malin Head. The Grianan of Aileach, a ringfort that served as the royal seat of the over-kingdom of Ailech, stands at the entrance to the peninsula.

== Towns and villages ==
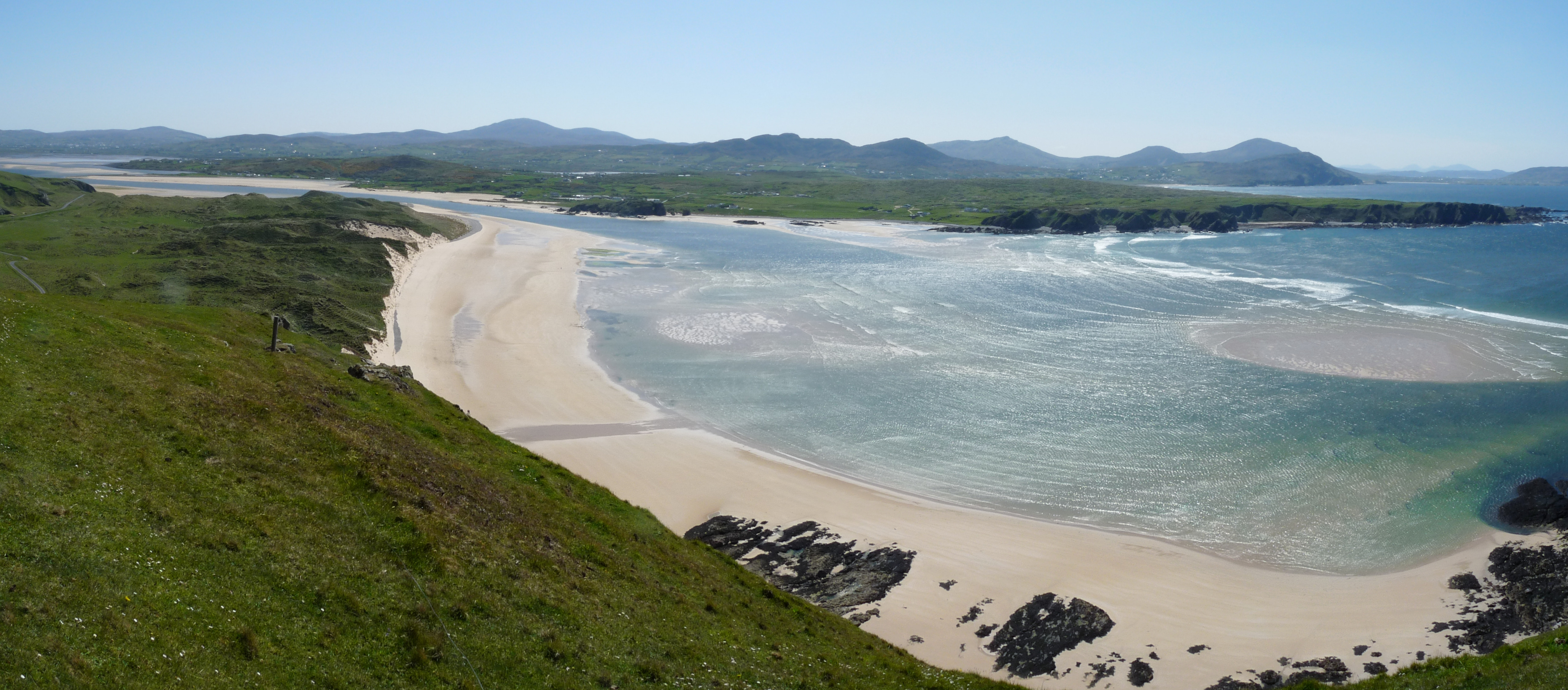
Five Finger Strand

The main towns and villages of Inishowen are:

- Ballyliffin, Buncrana, Bridgend, Burnfoot, Burt
- Carndonagh, Carrowmenagh, Clonmany, Culdaff
- Dunaff
- Fahan
- Glengad, Gleneely, Greencastle
- Malin, Malin Head, Moville, Muff
- Redcastle
- Shrove
- Quigley's Point
- Urris

== Geography ==
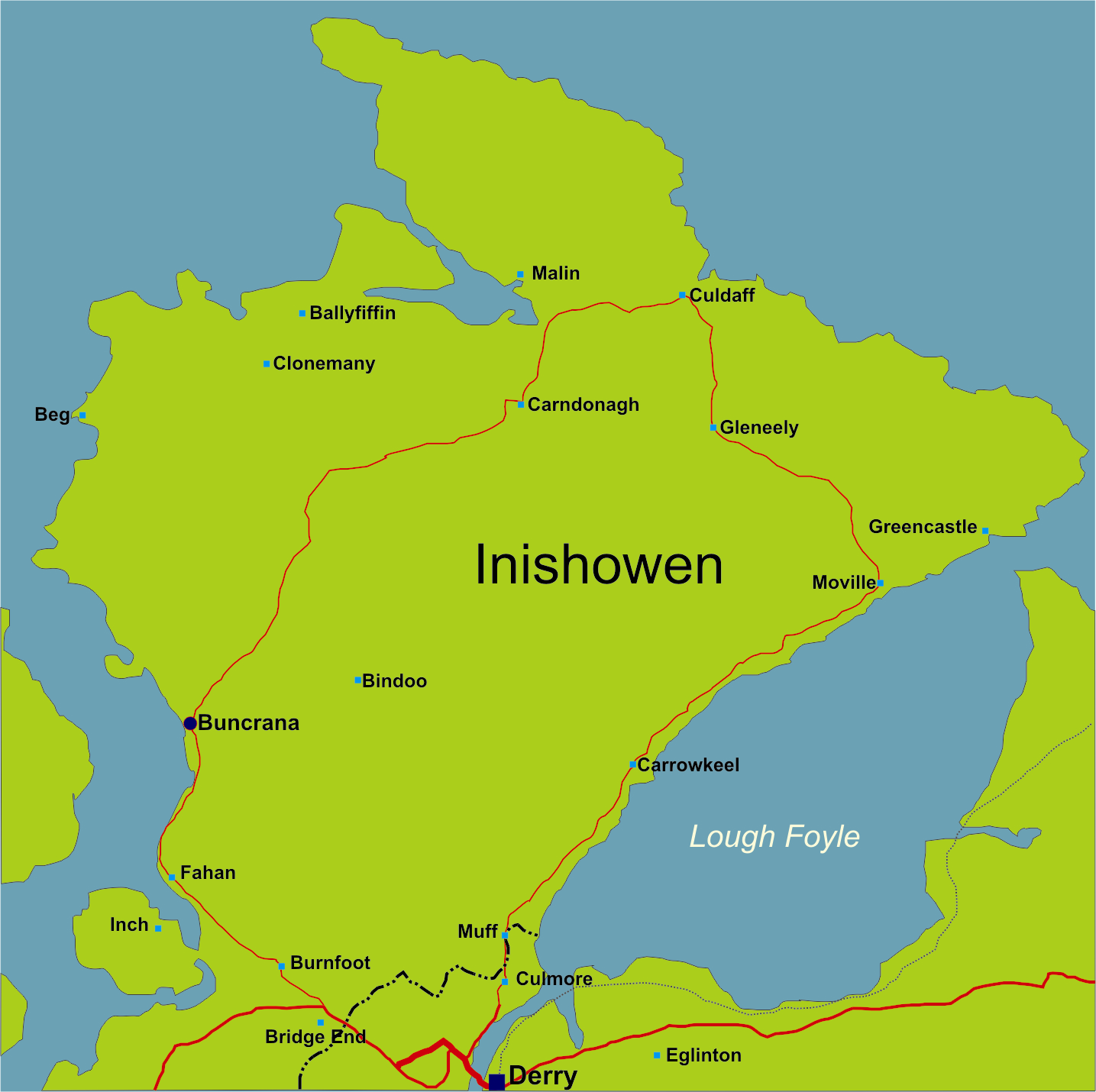
Detail on a map of Inishowen peninsula

Inishowen is a peninsula of 884.33 square kilometres (218,523 acres), situated in the northernmost part of the island of Ireland. It is bordered to the north by the Atlantic Ocean, to the east by Lough Foyle, and to the west by Lough Swilly. It is joined at the south to the rest of the island and is mostly in County Donegal in the Republic of Ireland. The south-eastern part of the peninsula lies in County Londonderry, Northern Ireland, having been transferred from County Donegal at the behest of the London companies as part of the Plantation of Ulster in the early 17th century. The peninsula is separated from the rest of Northern Ireland by the River Foyle.

After the last ice age, the peninsula was an island. Most of Inishowen's population inhabits the peripheral coastal areas, while the interior consists of low mountains, mostly covered in bogland, the highest of which is Slieve Snaght, which is 619 metres (2,030 feet) above sea level. Other major hills are located in the Malin Head peninsula, as well as the Urris Hills in west Inishowen. Due to its geography, Inishowen usually has relatively more moderate weather conditions, with temperatures slightly lower than in other parts of Ireland in summer and slightly warmer in winter, especially during extended cold weather periods.

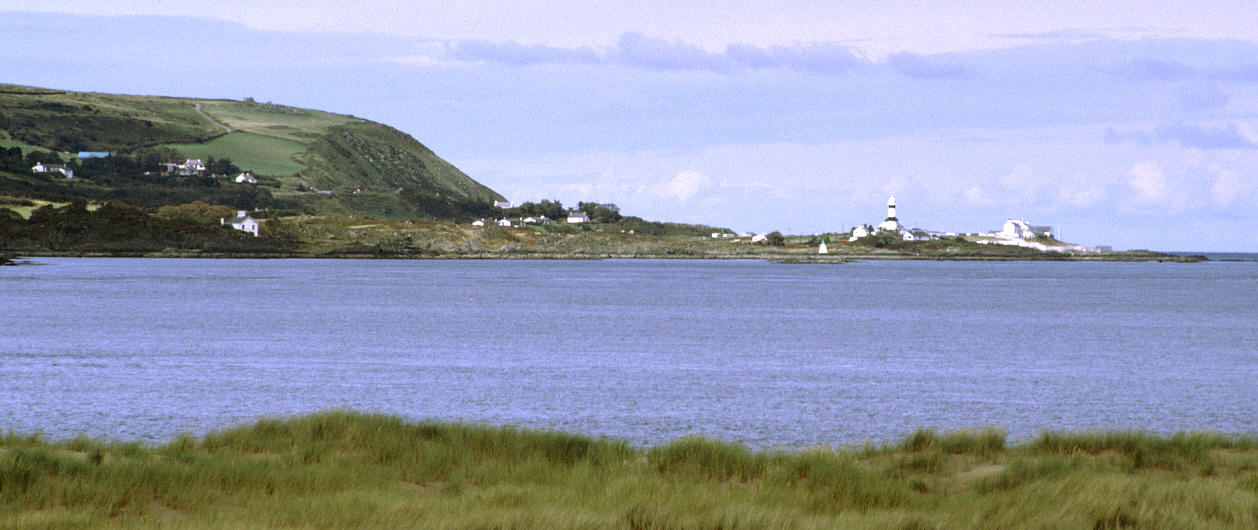
Looking across the mouth of Lough Foyle to Dunagree Point and Inishowen Head

Inishowen has several harbours, some of which are used for commercial fishing purposes, including Greencastle, Bunagee and Leenan. A seasonal ferry service crosses the Foyle, connecting Greencastle with Magilligan in County Londonderry, while another crosses the Swilly, connecting Buncrana with Rathmullan. The village of Fahan has a privately built marina.

There are several small outlying islands off the Inishowen coast, most notably Inishtrahull and Glashedy islands, both uninhabited, although the former was inhabited until the early twentieth century. Inch, located in Lough Swilly, is technically no longer an island, as it has a causeway connecting it to the mainland at Tooban, south of Fahan.

Lough Swilly is a fjord-like lough, and was of strategic importance for many years to the British Empire as a deep-water harbour. It is also famous as the departure point of the Flight of the Earls. Lough Foyle is important as the entrance to the river Foyle, and the city of Derry, but is much shallower than Lough Swilly, and requires the use of a guide boat to guide ships to and from Londonderry Port.

A large area of land, most of which now forms part of Grianán Farm, one of the largest farms in Ireland, was reclaimed from a shallow area of Lough Swilly, stretching from the village of Burnfoot to Bridgend and Burt. The outline of this land is plainly visible due to its flatness, showing a marked contrast to the more mountainous area surrounding it.

== History ==
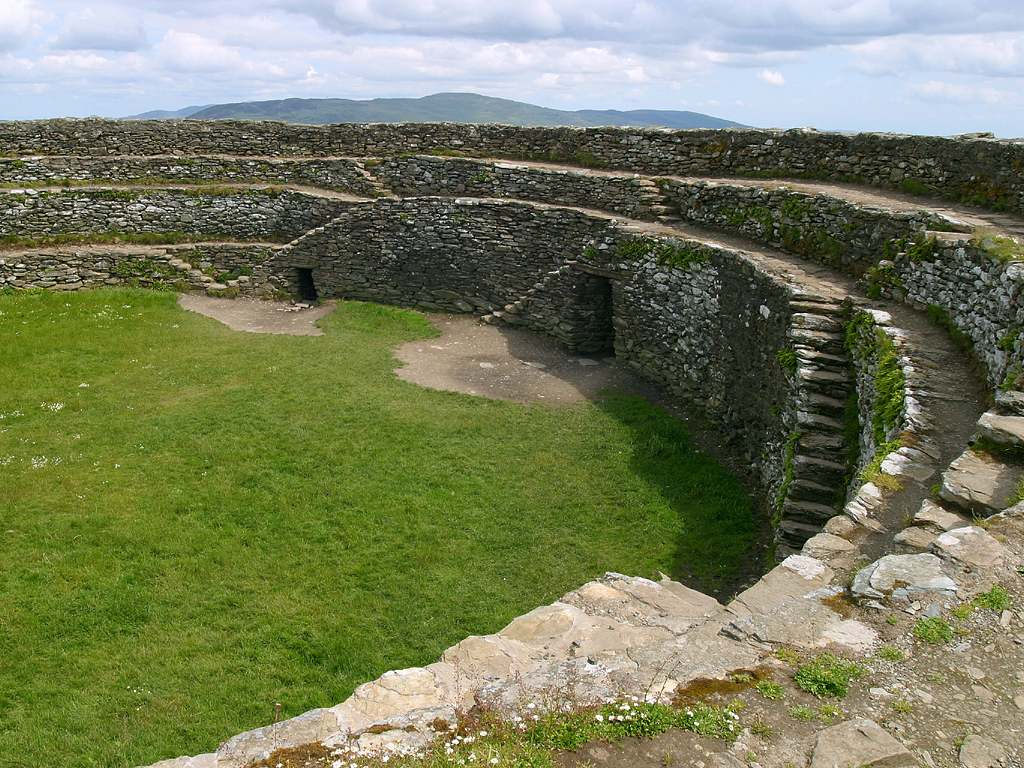
The Grianán of Aileach is a stone fort on the Inishowen peninsula.

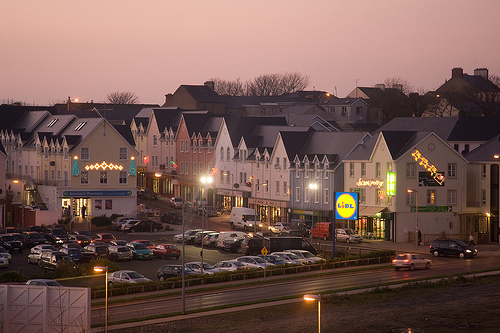
Buncrana is the largest town in Inishowen and the second largest in County Donegal

Ptolemy's Geography (2nd century) described a point called Ουεννικνιον (Wenniknion, perhaps from *wen- "friends") which probably referred to Inishowen.

Predating the formation of County Donegal by centuries, the area was named Inis Eoghain (the Island of Eoghan) after Eógan mac Néill, son of Niall of the Nine Hostages (Niall Naoigeallach, a High King of Ireland), whose name was also used for Tyrone (Irish: Tír Eoghain). Inis Eoghain is also the ancient homeland of the Meic Lochlainn (descended from the tribe of Eoghan), a clan that grew so formidable that they eventually came under siege by a Limerick King, who came north to Aileach, and ordered the destruction of Aileach fort, and that each soldier was to carry away a stone from the fort in order to prevent its rebuilding. Later, after the decline of the Meic Lochlainn, the Norman Earldom of Ulster expanded into Inishowen, founding Greencastle in the process. After the Bruce invasion in the early 14th century, the Ó Dochartaigh clan (descended from the tribe of Conaill), gradually conquered it as they lost their own homeland in the Laggan, a district in the east of Tír Conaill.

Inishowen has many historical monuments, dating back to early settlements, including the ruins of several castles, and the fort at Grianán Aileach. The ancient Grianán Ailigh fort at Burt was the one-time seat of the High Kings of Ireland, including both High Kings of the Meic Lochlainn, who held power in Inis Eoghain for many centuries. It was restored in the nineteenth century, although some damage in recent years has resulted in the partial collapse of the south side wall. Among the main castle ruins of Inishowen are Carrickabraghey on the Isle of Doagh, the Norman Castle at Greencastle, Inch Castle, Buncrana Castle and Elagh Castle.

In 1196, John de Courcy, an Anglo-Norman knight who had invaded Ulster in 1177, defeated the King of the Cenél Conaill and most of County Donegal was at his mercy. Two years later he returned to devastate Inishowen. However, in subsequent campaigns de Courcy was defeated by Clan O'Neill and their Chief Áed Méith and found himself unable to conquer the western part of Ulster.

In 1608 Sir Cahir O'Doherty, the Chief of the Name of Clan O'Doherty and Lord of Inishowen, launched O'Doherty's Rebellion by burning Derry. After the defeat of the uprising, most of Clan O'Doherty's territory was awarded to Arthur Chichester. In 1990, an O'Doherty clan ceremony was held in Derry, during which Ramon Salvador O'Dogherty of Spain was installed as ceremonial "Lord of Inishowen" and received a traditional white wand of office.

Ireland's deadliest road accident happened at Inishowen in July 2010.

== Demographics ==
At the last Census of Ireland in 2016, Inishowen counted a population of 40,544 Buncrana is the largest town in Inishowen, with a 2016 population of 6,785 in its urban area.

== Politics ==
On a national level, Inishowen forms part of the Donegal constituency, which elects five TDs to Dáil Éireann, the lower house of the Oireachtas (the Irish Parliament). At the county level, Inishowen is an electoral area, a Municipal District, electing nine councillors to Donegal County Council. Currently there are three members of Fianna Fáil, two each of Sinn Féin and Fine Gael, one from the Labour Party and one independent.

== Media ==
In addition to the radio stations and newspapers available elsewhere in Donegal, there are several media outlets that are based solely on the peninsula, including two newspapers (the Inish Times and the Inishowen Independent, both of which are published in Buncrana) and one online daily local news service (InishowenNews.com). The traditional news source for Inishowen is the Derry Journal, published in nearby Derry city, since 1772. It still serves the peninsula as a paper of record.

== Tourism ==
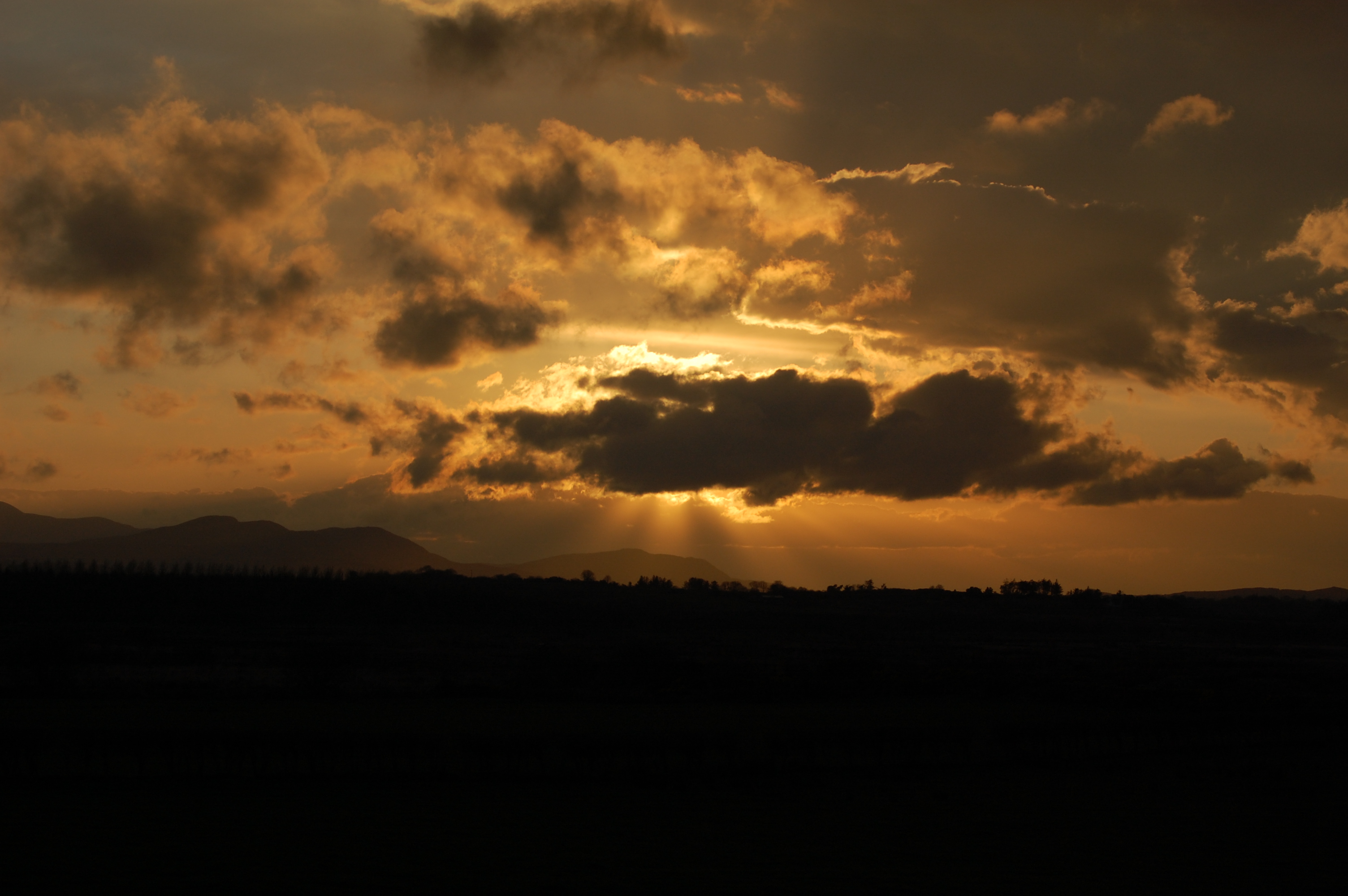
Inishowen sunset

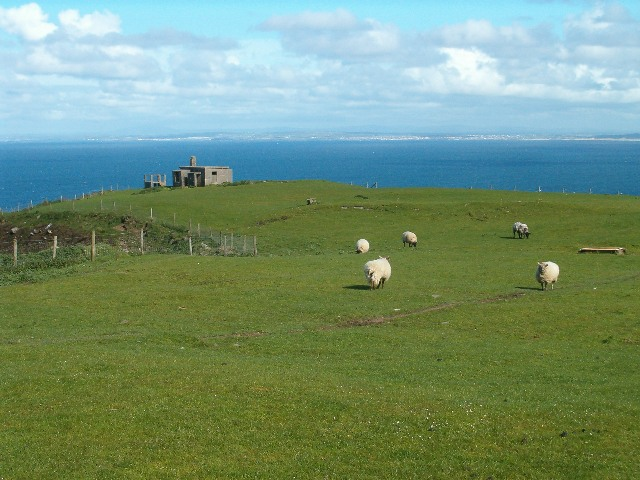
Sheep grazing at Inishowen Head

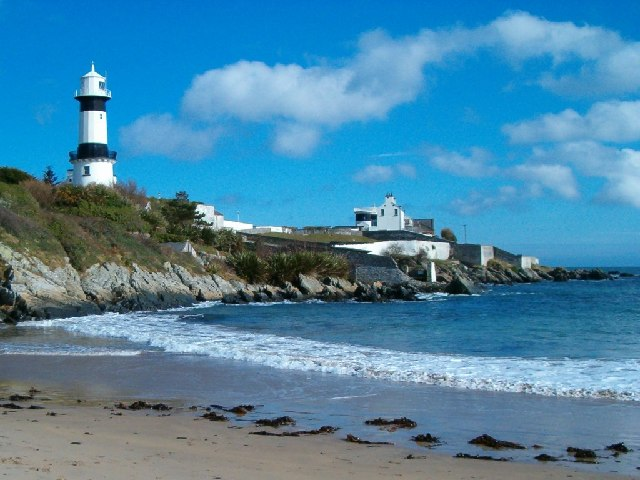
Lighthouse at Dunagree Point

Inishowen is at the starting (or ending) point of the Wild Atlantic Way.

The Inishowen 100 tourist route is an approximately 100-mile signposted scenic drive around the peninsula. It takes in or passes nearby many of the tourist sights and places of interest on the peninsula. It starts at Bridgend where there is a lay-by with a large map and information boards. The first leg of the coastal route is along the coast of Lough Swilly. It passes Inch Island, Fahan (a blue flag beach), Fahan 18-hole Golf Course, Buncrana Town, Tullyarvan Mill (An interpretive centre tracing over 250 years of textile production in the Buncrana area.). It continues along the western coast on Lough Swilly. The route passes Dunree beach, Dunree Fort (military museum) and then turns inland for Mamore Gap (between the Urris Hills and Raghtin More mountain), Leenan Bay, Dunaff, Head, Tullagh Bay (a blue flag beach), through the villages of Clonmany and Ballyliffin. Ballyliffin has an 18-hole golf course.

The route then passes the Isle of Doagh (where there is a famine museum and an interpretive centre). Next is Carndonagh - the second largest town in Inishowen, after which the route turns North again through Malin Town, past Five Fingers Strand and then up onto cliff top viewpoint at Knockamany Bens, then down again to sea level with the route looking out into the Atlantic, before heading to Ireland's most northerly point Malin Head.

On the North Eastern coast, the route passes through Culdaff village and Culdaff Bay (another Blue Flag beach), Tramone Bay, and Kinnagoe Bay. Further East, it reaches Lough Foyle and then Greencastle (a port used by fishing boats and a landing point for the car ferry from Magilligan in Northern Ireland). Then, as the road heads South along Lough Foyle, it passes through Moville town, Quigley's Point and the village of Muff.

=== Museums ===
The famine village on the Isle of Doagh in Lagacurry takes visitors on a tour from the famine days of the 1840s to the present. It includes thatched cottages, a large walk-through museum, and guided tours of life in an isolated place living on the edge.

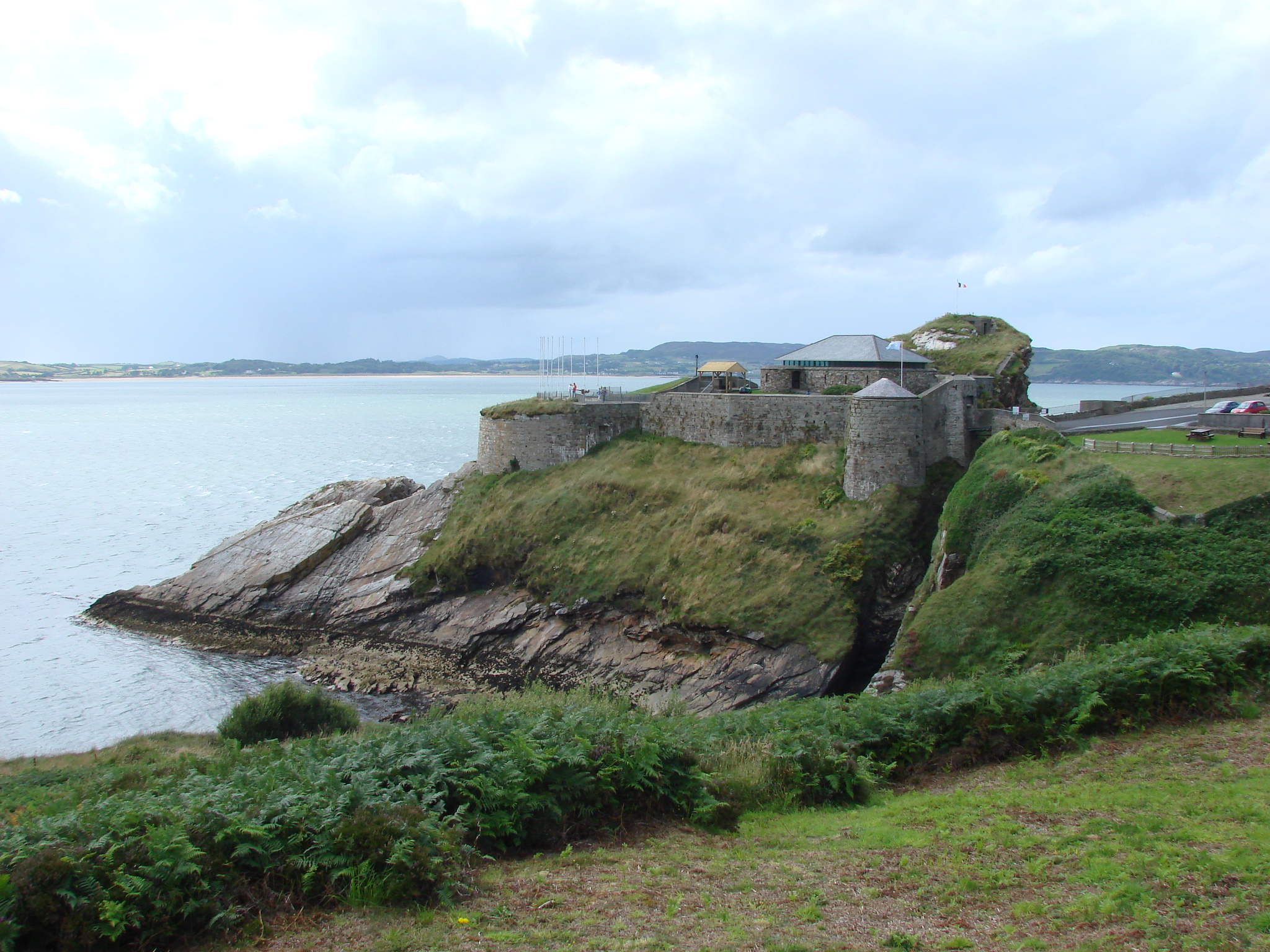
Fort Dunree

Fort Dunree Military Museum is located at the site of the former coastal defence and fortification at Fort Dunree. During the Napoleonic Wars, the fort was built to defend Lough Swilly. The museum includes restored guns, a military camp and underground bunkers.

The Inishowen Maritime Museum & Planetarium was founded in 1994 by maritime history enthusiasts who raised funds to buy the Old Coast Guard Station on Greencastle Harbor. The museum includes photographs and artefacts. A planetarium is housed in an extension built to the museum. There is a memorial to those lost at sea from the Inishowen Peninsula in front of the museum.

== Sport ==
=== Gaelic games ===
Inishowen has a number of Gaelic football clubs which represent the various parishes on the peninsula. Each club has different football teams for both sexes and a variety of age groups. While hurling is played at underage level by all the clubs there is, of yet, no adult team fielded on a regular basis by any of them. Local clubs include Beart CLG (in Burt), Buncrana GAA club, Carndonagh GAA club, Malin GAA club, Moville GAA club, Naomh Pádraig GAA club (Muff), and Urris GAA club.

=== Association football ===
The Inishowen Football League (IOFL) is an amateur league for football (soccer) clubs in the Inishowen peninsula.

=== Other sports ===
Inishowen Rugby Club is based at Carndonagh.

Other sports in the area include cycling, golf, horse riding, kayaking, shooting (for example at North Inishowen Gun Club ), surfing and rock climbing.
