= List of participants in the Nine Years' War (Ireland) =

This article is a list of the participants, both civilian and military, of the Nine Years' War in Ireland. The war was fought in the late 16th and early 17th century and was a conflict between a coalition of Irish lords and their Spanish allies against the English and their authorities in Ireland.

- In order to be listed here an individual must have a historical record of their conduct, position or any role they played in the war during the years 1593–1603.

== Confederacy of Irish lords ==
Beginning with the alliance between Tyrone and Tyrconnell in 1593, most of the Irish kingdoms and lordships gradually assembled, either voluntarily or through coercion, into a loose confederation whose aim was to expunge English rule in Ireland once and for all. Although the motives of Hugh O'Neill, the symbolic leader of the Irish during the conflict, are still debated, a return to the Gaelic order and the disbandment of English institutions in Ireland was a paramount objective for not only O'Neill, but his allies as well.

=== Gaelic lords ===
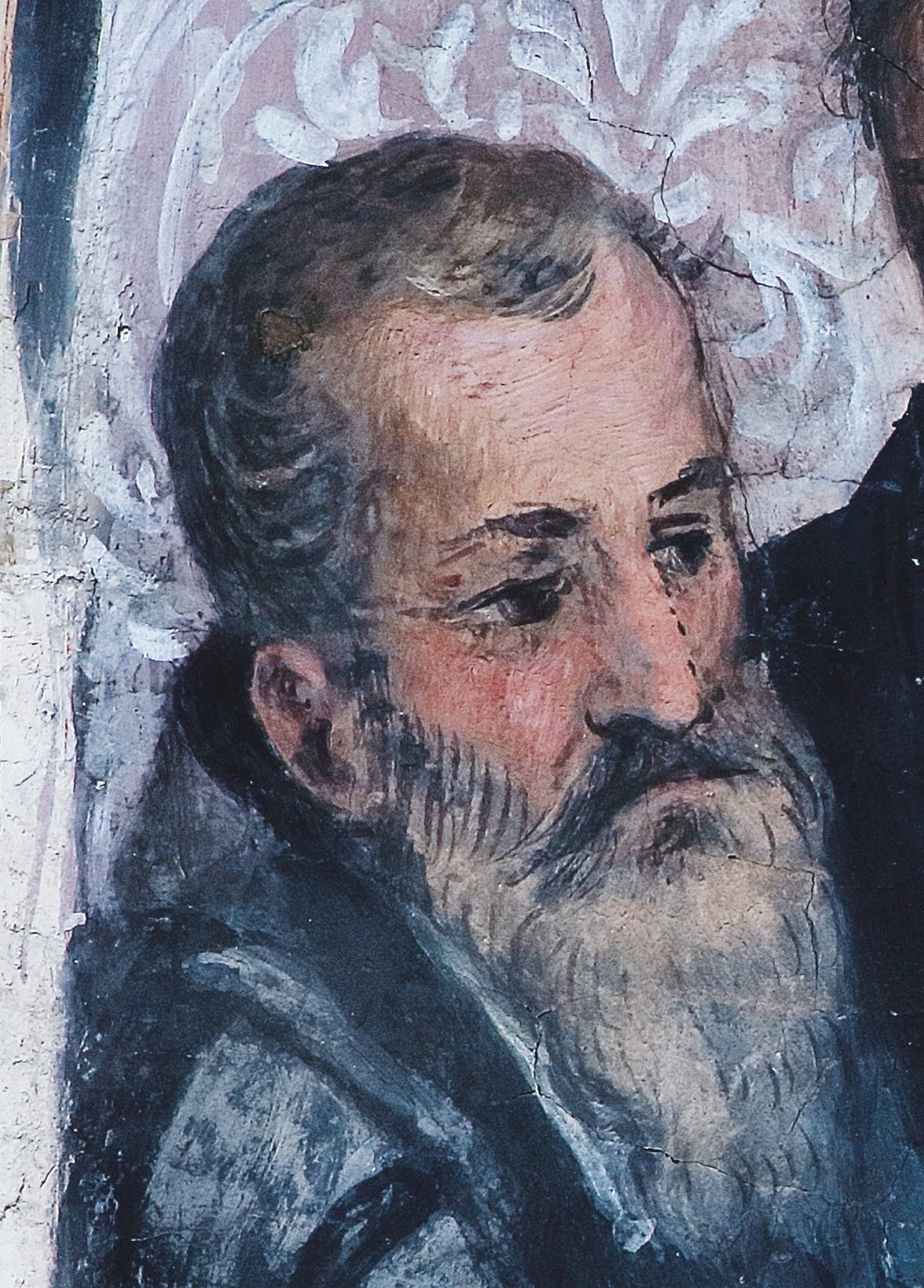
Hugh O'Neill, Earl of Tyrone

==== Tyrone ====
- Hugh O'Neill was the Earl of Tyrone and the effective leader of the Irish forces, both diplomatically and militarily, to such a degree that the war is often referred to as Tyrone's Rebellion. While it took until February 1595 for O'Neill to declare open rebellion, he had been laying down the foundations for war for some years. This included his alliance to the once hostile Tyrconnell, which capitalized on the unified strength of Ulster, his military reforms which introduced modern tactics and muskets to Gaelic-Irish warfare for the first time, and his correspondence with Philip II, which brought vital Spanish financial and military support to Ireland.
- Cormac MacBaron O'Neill was Hugh's younger brother. He was initially a stalking horse of sorts, having led forces against the English before Tyrone was formally at war. He assisted Hugh Maguire in the Siege of Enniskillen and the Battle of the Ford of the Biscuits in 1594, victories which shocked the Dublin administration. His relationship with Hugh was frayed by the war, but he remained loyal throughout, even when living in the woods following the Burning of Dungannon. However, due to their falling out, he did not travel with Hugh to Spain in 1607.

==== Tyrconnell ====
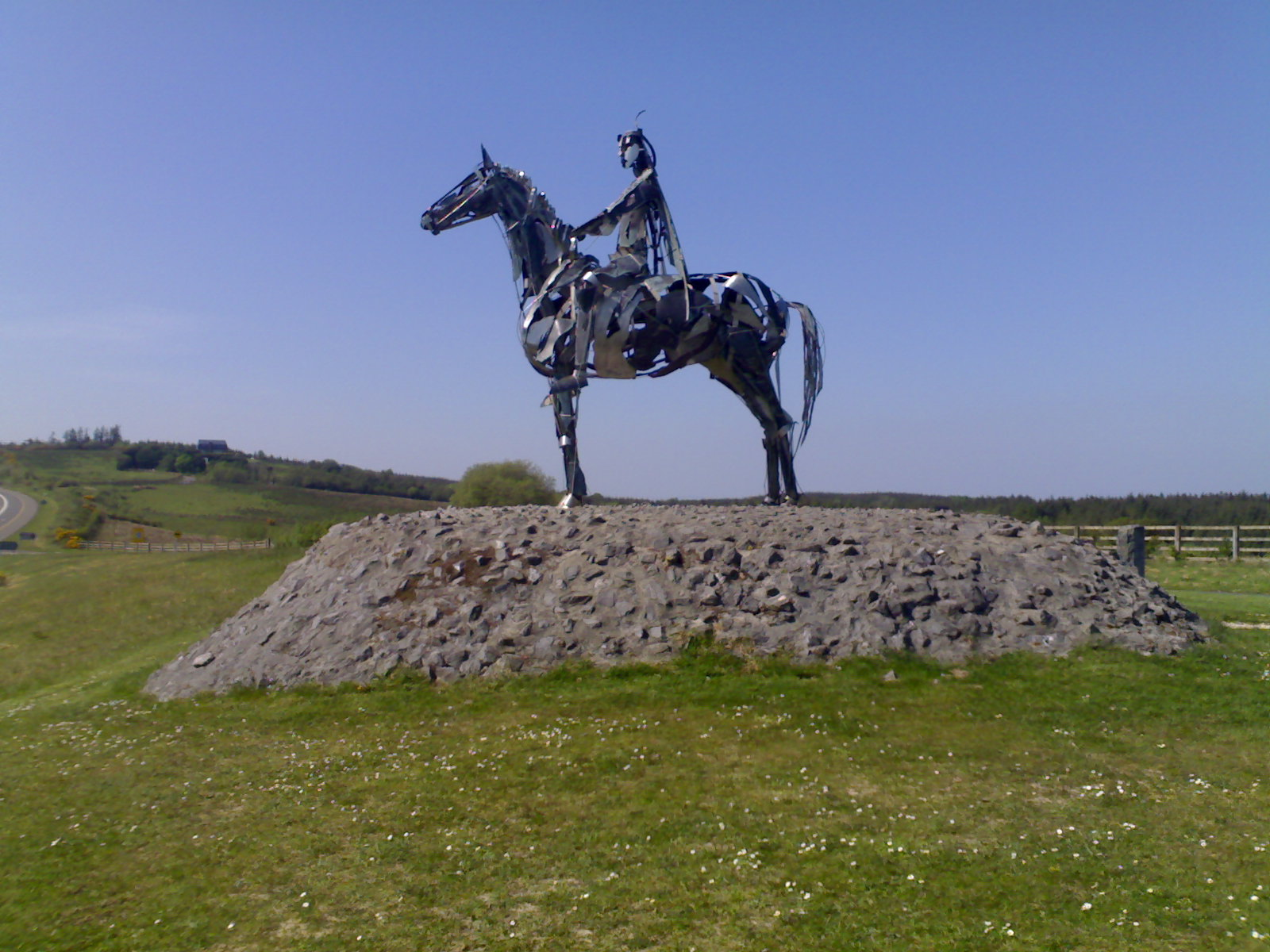
Hugh Roe O'Donnell, Lord of Tyrconnell.

- Hugh Roe O'Donnell was the King of Tyrconnell and the most prominent commander of Irish forces in the war. He had been in conflict with the English since his escape from Dublin Castle in 1592. A master of cavalry raids, his punitive assaults against Turlough Luineach collapsed the latter's lordship, allowing Hugh O'Neill to take power. Having successfully taken Sligo in June 1595, his access to Connacht was left unimpeded and his control of the province became so absolute that Governor Clifford referred to it as O'Donnell's Commonwealth. He is noted by both Irish and English historical sources for his great charisma and leadership. His death in 1602 was followed swiftly by Tyrconnell's withdrawal from the war.
- Rory O'Donnell was left in charge of Tyrconnell for the duration of his brother's expedition to Spain in January 1602, and became king following the latter's death in September of that year. He inherited a largely hopeless situation and, despite his best efforts, failed to revive the rebellion. He surrendered at Mellifont and travelled alongside Hugh O'Neill to seek a pardon from King James I in March 1603.

==== Fermanagh ====
- Hugh Maguire was the Lord of Fermanagh and one of the confederation's chief tacticians. He spearheaded vital victories in the early stages of the war, namely at Enniskillen and Ford of the Biscuits. He also led the victorious cavalry units at Yellow Ford and Clontibret. As the war expanded in scope he commanded the Irish cavalry in Leinster and Munster, wresting much of the country from the English. He was intercepted in Cork by Warham St. Leger in March 1600 and, despite killing St Leger, died from his wounds shortly afterwards.
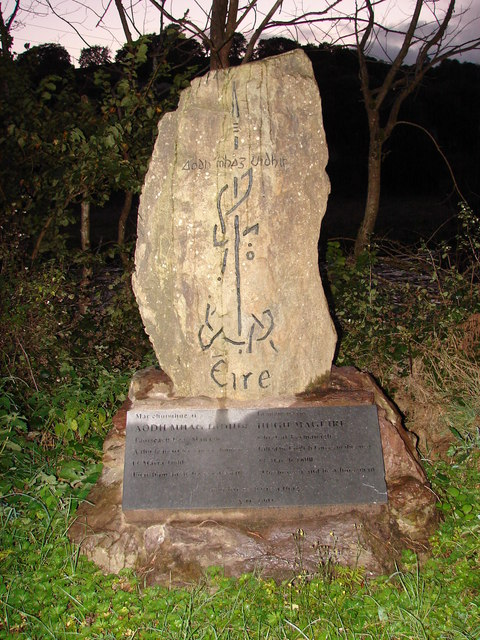
  Memorial to Hugh Maguire in Garravagh
- Cuchonnacht Maguire succeeded his half-brother Hugh in 1600. A succession crisis erupted immediately after Hugh's death as the English threw financial support behind a rival claimant, Connor Roe. Infighting claimed the lives of over 200 people in Fermanagh before O'Donnell finally stepped in to quell the bloodshed. He played a much less prominent role in the war and left Ireland in 1607.

==== O'Sullivan Beara ====
- Donal Cam O'Sullivan Beare was the head of the O'Sullivan sept and the Prince of Beare in southwestern Munster. He initially kept his distance from the Ulster lords, but eventual joined the war and tasked himself with securing the southern coast for a Spanish landing. Following Kinsale, George Carew was particularly vicious towards O'Sullivan's kingdom and carried out a number of atrocities against its people, forcing O'Sullivan and 1,000 men, women and children to embark on an infamous 500 km long march in the depths of winter to seek refuge from his ally in West Breifne. By the time they arrived only 35 of their party had survived.

==== West Breifne ====
- Brian Óg O'Rourke was King of West Breifne and one of the confederation's foremost commanders. He was Ireland's most intractable lord, having been in continuous rebellion against the English from January 1590 to April 1603. His plundering of Sligo in May 1593 was a precursor to the war and despite being one of Ireland's poorest lordships, West Breifne, under Brian Óg, contributed disproportionately to the war effort, including their decisive victory over England at Curlew Pass. He was the last Gaelic lord to be toppled on 25 April 1603, almost a month after the others had surrendered.
- Teigue O'Rourke was Brian Óg's half-brother and a rival claimant to the kingship of West Breifne. He lived in exile in Tyrconnell and was a close ally of O'Donnell, whose sister he married in 1599. Despite being in frequent contact with the English, he was a committed member of the Gaelic alliance until Kinsale. While Brian Óg and O'Donnell were at Kinsale, and it became obvious that their defeat was imminent, he finally defected to the English in late 1601.

==== Umhaill ====
- Grace O'Malley, Queen of Umhaill, and much of her clan actively assisted the Gaelic cause, although they remained officially neutral. The O'Malleys never ceased their piracy of English ships during the war and on several occasions were blatantly acting against them, such as the five O'Malley ships stationed in the Shannon Estuary that delivered supplies to the Irish whilst preventing the English from crossing in 1599. Curiously, her son Tibbot na Long was a staunch loyalist throughout the war.

==== East Breifne ====
- Pilib O'Reilly was proclaimed King of East Breifne by Hugh O'Neill following his brother's death in 1596. East Breifne had been a vassal of Tyrone until the 1530s, and Pilib achieved great acclaim for the successful defence of the kingdom against an invasion by Tyrone in 1580–81. He submitted to Hugh but still harboured great antipathy towards the O'Neills. He ruled for mere weeks before his suspicious death, when he was accidentally shot and killed by a stray musket bullet fired by one of O'Neill's soldiers.
- Emon O'Reilly was inaugurated as king of East Breifne by O'Neill in October 1596, after Pilib's death. The 90 year old tánaiste had seen great change occur within his kingdom due to English incursions in the latter half of the 16th century. He served as an MP in the Irish House of Commons but had a well documented affinity for Tyrone and Irish tradition, and remained committed to the rebellion until his death in 1601, although was not able to contribute much.
- Eoghan O'Reilly served as acting King of East Breifne from 1601 to 1603. He was tasked with causing disruption along the frontier with Dublin and Meath in order to divert English resources away from the battle at Kinsale. He evidently failed in this regard as O'Neill was reported to be very angry at his inactivity during the battle.
- Brian Bán McKiernan was the Mág Tighearnán chief of Tullyhunco. He allowed O'Donnell to camp in his territory following raids into Connacht and assisted the rebels against his O'Reilly overlords and their English allies in Cavan, before their capitulation at the hands of O'Neill in late 1595. In June 1602 he was granted a pardon for fighting against the Queen's forces.

==== Clann Uí Bhroin ====
- Fiach McHugh O'Byrne was chief of the O'Byrne clan in Wicklow. Fiach had achieved acclaim for his defeat of the English at Glenmalure in 1580 during the Second Desmond Rebellion, and aided in the escape of Hugh O'Donnell from Dublin castle in 1592. Although he was not initially involved in the war, the English proclaimed him a traitor in 1594 and led campaigns into Wicklow against him. Despite obtaining a pardon from Lord Deputy Russell, the elderly and ailing O'Byrne was captured and executed in May 1597.
- Felim McFiach O'Byrne succeeded his father as chief of the O'Byrnes, and despite remaining a nominal threat, the clan never regained a solid footing against the English in Wicklow. He submitted to Elizabeth in 1600 and withdrew from the war.

==== Loígis ====
- Brian Riabhach O'More was a nobleman from Loígis who fought against the English in Leinster. The O'Mores had been expelled from much of Loígis four decades prior, as it was the first place in Ireland to be planted by the English in 1556.

==== MacCarthy Mór ====
- Florence MacCarthy was the most prominent member of the MacCarthy dynasty which controlled much of southwest Munster. His kingdom had been fractured by the Desmond rebellions and he sought to restore himself as the chief of MacCarthy Mór with O'Neill's assistance. He agreed to provide the landing Spanish soldiers with food and refuge for their battles against the English. The size of the kingdom proved a problem during Kinsale, as Spanish soldiers were spread thin across the vast southwest coast in MacCarthy's castles and forts, leaving them not readily available for pitched battles

=== Anglo-Irish lords ===
==== Desmond ====
- James FitzThomas FitzGerald, known as the Súgán Earl of Desmond joined the rebellion in 1598 at the request of O'Neill and rallied his countrymen to re-establish Desmond, which had been dismantled 2 years prior following the Desmond Rebellions of the late 1500s. This dramatically expanded the scope of the war, as Munster fell to the Irish lords. He initially commanded an army 8,000 strong which he directed at his family's traditional foe, the Butlers of Ormonde, to address historical grievances. After suffering a heavy defeat near Kilmallock in October 1600 his forces never recovered. He went into hiding in May 1601 but was captured later that month.
- John FitzThomas FitzGerald was James' brother who rebelled alongside him. According to 19th century historian C.B. Gibson, John was "the prime instigator of it [the rebellion]". Following his brother's downfall, he evaded capture and fled to Kilkenny and from there onto Spain in 1603, where he was conferred the title "Conde de Desmond".

==== Fartullagh ====
- Richard Tyrrell was the Lord of Fartullagh in Westmeath and a close friend of Hugh O'Neill. He was made commander of the Irish forces in Leinster in 1594, during which time he recorded a string of victories against the Crown, most notably at Tyrrellspass where his forces killed 1,000 English soldiers – the area now bears his name as a result. Following Desmond's entry into the war in 1598, Tyrrell was made Colonel General of Munster and he fought until Mellifont in 1603.

==== Lower Mac William ====
- Tibbot MacWalter Kittagh Bourke was appointed chief of Mac William Íochtar in 1595 following O'Donnell's conquest of the territory. Despite immense internal pushback against his rule, primarily by his arch-rival, the loyalist Tibbot ne Long Bourke, he remained in effective control of Mayo for most of the war years. He agreed to assassinate O'Donnell in exchange for payment and recognition as the Earl of Mayo, however English money was not forthcoming and he therefore never carried out the deed.

==== Clanricarde ====
- Redmond Burke was soldier in the Spanish army, who, along with his four brothers, returned to Ireland to fight in the war. Redmond was a pretender to the Lordship of Clanricarde, and at times occupied much of County Galway and parts of Clare. His brothers John Oge, William and Thomas were recorded by the annals as occupying much of the castles in Ormond and Desmond in 1600. He fought at Kinsale and travelled with O'Donnell to Spain following the battle.
- Ulick Burke was a grandson of Ulick na gCeann Burke, 1st Earl of Clanricarde and ensign to Governor of Sligo George Bingham. Following months without due pay he killed in Bingham in 1595 and took possession of Sligo castle. He handed it over to O'Donnell who made him a constable for the Irish alliance in Connacht, and he fought across the province rather than in any one particular area.

==== Cahir ====
- James Galdie Butler was the brother of Thomas Butler, 2nd Baron Cahir. He was given control of Cahir Castle by his brother in 1599 but defected to the confederation. His brother was arrested by Essex during the Siege of Cahir Castle in 1599, as James Galdie held out the castle against the English. With only 100 men defending the castle against 5,000 English troops, it was quickly lost and James Galdie fled. The castle was returned to Thomas who later joined the rebellion and handed the castle backed over to the rebels in 1600.

== England and Kingdom of Ireland ==
The war presented the first major threat to English authority in Ireland since the beginning of the Tudor conquest. The dominant forces in Elizabeth's court at the time were the opposing factions of Essex and Cecil. While both men were anti-Catholic and desired the full subjugation of Ireland, their approaches to the war differed, with Essex demanding more aggressive action against the native Irish lordships, and Cecil preferring a steadier approach. The war ended shortly after Elizabeth's death in March 1603.

Lord Mountjoy was largely responsible for ending the war in the crucial years from 1600 to 1603. He ultimately became the dominant English voice in Ireland until his departure in 1604. The generous terms offered by Mountjoy to the Irish in the Treaty of Mellifont were quickly undone by his successor, Sir Arthur Chichester.

=== English government officials ===
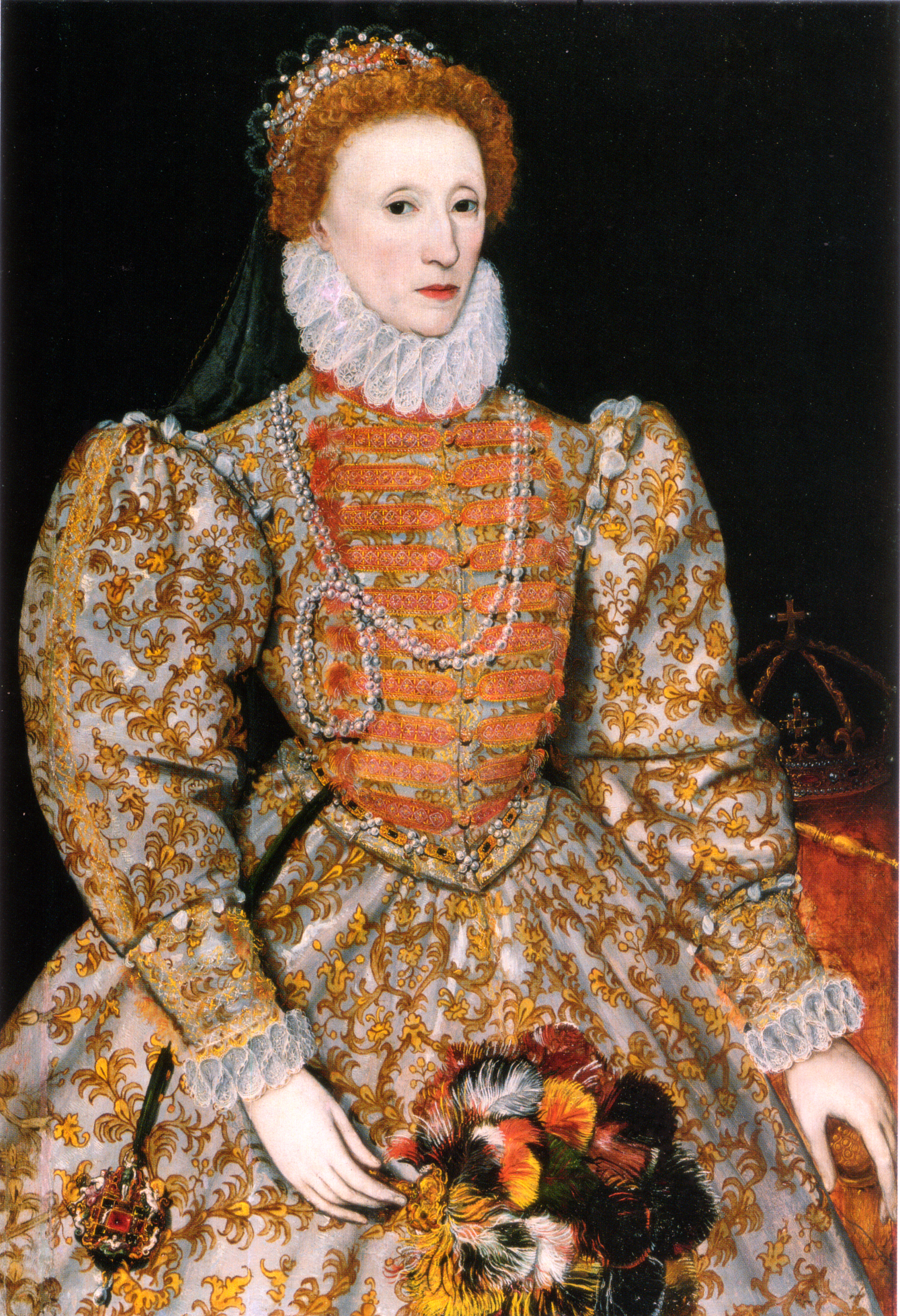
Queen Elizabeth I of England and Ireland.

- Queen Elizabeth I (until 24 March 1603)
- King James I (after 24 March 1603)
- William Cecil, 1st Baron Burghley, Chief Advisor to Elizabeth I (1558–1598)
- Geoffrey Fenton, Secretary of State in Ireland

==== Lord Deputies of Ireland ====
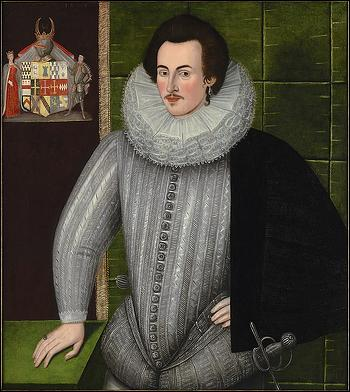
Sir Charles Blount

- William FitzWilliam replaced John Perrot as Lord Deputy and served from 1588 to 1594. His aggressive pursuit of conquest in Ireland was a major contributing factor in the outbreak of the war, particularity his execution of Lord McMahon and the division of Airgíalla amongst planters in 1589, although similarly antagonistic policies had been in place for many decades prior. Nevertheless, Attorney General Lucas Dillon noted in 1590 that relations between the Gaelic Powers and the English had deteriorated greatly under FitzWilliam.
- William Russell, 1st Baron Russell of Thornhaugh served from 1594 to 1597. Despite favouring military force over negotiation with the Irish, his time in office also saw the Gaelic Powers strengthen their position even further. He did however defeat the O'Byrnes in Wicklow, who threatened the capital, before being recalled to England.
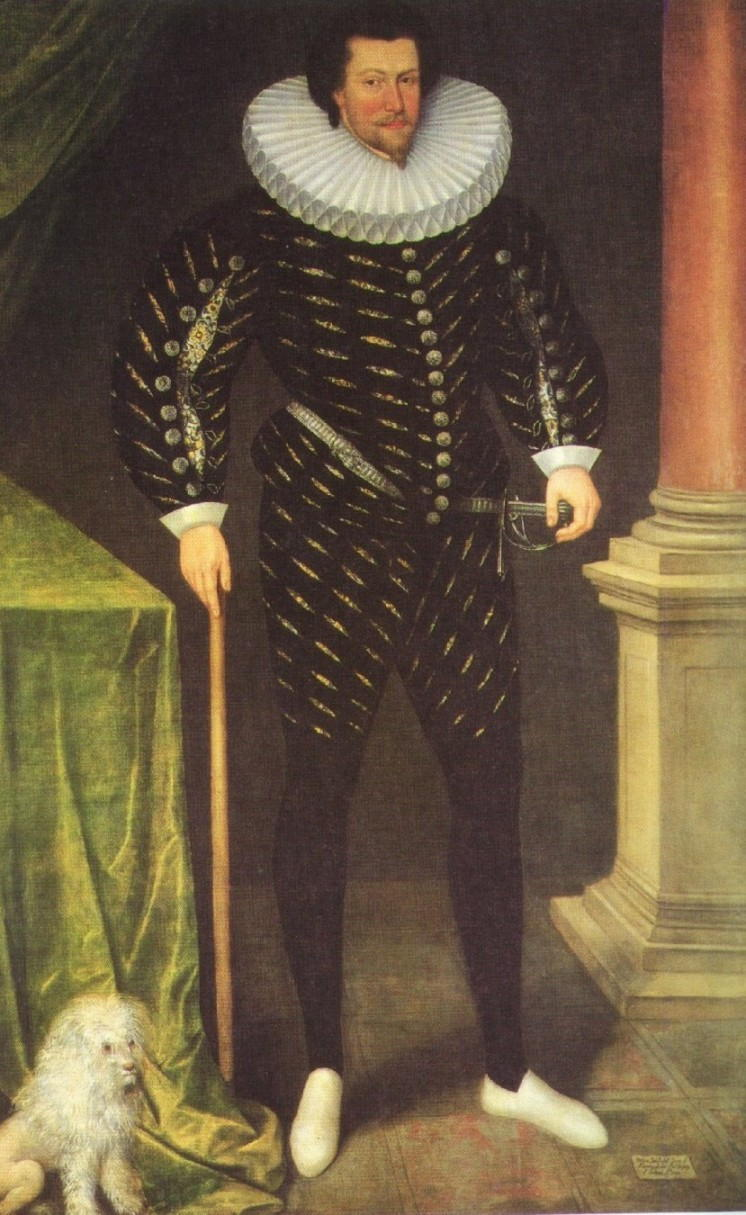
  William Russell, 1st Baron Russell of Thornhaugh
- Thomas Burgh, 3rd Baron Burgh served from April to October 1597, when he died in office. Beset by failure in Ireland, infighting within the English court prevented the appointment of a new Lord Deputy until 30 December 1598.
- Robert Devereux, 2nd Earl of Essex was appointed Lord Lieutenant of Ireland in 1599, at his own request. His campaign in Ireland was a catastrophe and the position of the crown was severely weakened during his time in office. He marched to Munster in an unsuccessful campaign against the Súgán Earl, during which his army suffered heavily from disease and desertion. Under his stewardship the English endured several humiliating defeats and when asked to invade Ulster, he instead held an unauthorized parlay with O'Neill in which they settled upon a truce. Agreeing to only inform the Queen of this meeting in person, he returned to London with his reputation in tatters, and would end up executed for treason less than two years later.
- Charles Blount, 8th Baron Mountjoy, often referred to as Lord Mountjoy, served as the Lord Deputy of Ireland from January 1600 to April 1603, after which he was promoted to the more prestigious title Lord Lieutenant of Ireland. Almost all of Ireland was in Gaelic hands when he took over from Essex. He achieved by far the most success of any English commander in the war and is often credited with bringing it to a close. His ruthless scorched earth policy in Ulster, his decisive victory over the combined Irish-Spanish forces at Kinsale and his ordering of a successful amphibious landing at Lough Foyle all precipitated the collapse of the Irish confederation.

==== Lord Justices of Ireland ====
- Thomas Norreys served as both Lord Justice of Ireland and Lord President of Munster from 1597 to 1599. He had served in Connacht in the 1580s where he pursued the Burkes, and served there again during Bingham's suspension in 1597. While marching from Buttevant to Limerick city in May 1599 he was ambushed by Thomas Burke and struck in the neck with a pike. He was taken to Mallow in late June where he suffered for some months until he died of his wounds on 20 August.
- George Carey, was an English Member of Parliament who served as Lord Justice of Ireland in 1599 and again in 1603. He was also Treasurer-at-War under Robert Devereux.
- George Carew served as both Lord Justice of Ireland and Lord President of Munster in 1600. He was granted a wide array of powers, including the right to declare martial law. He was effective in putting down the Súgán Earl in central Munster, as well as picking off Spanish occupied fortresses after Kinsale. Carew's massacre of Dunboy in June 1602 is regarded as one of the most ruthless acts of the war.

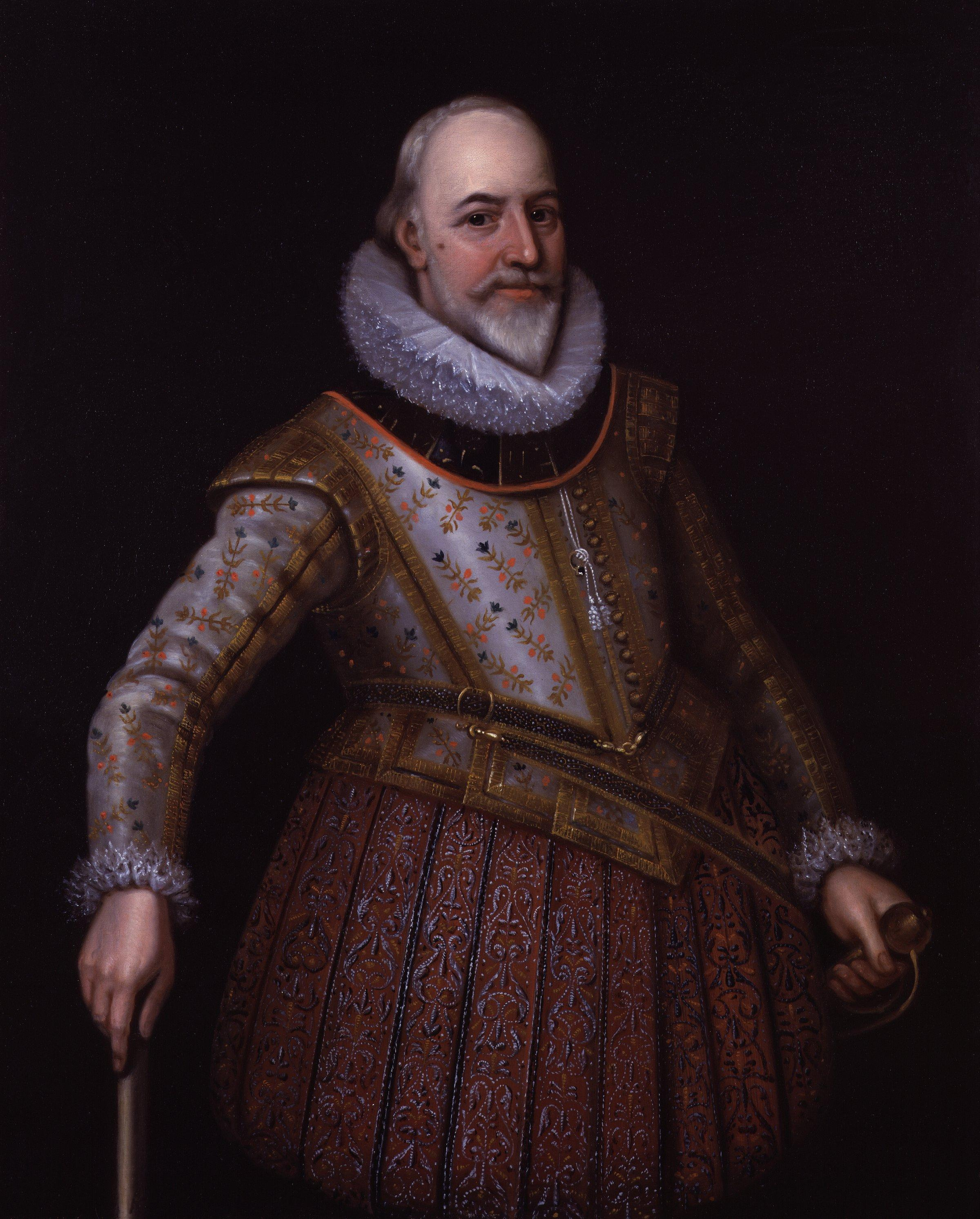
George Carew, 1st Earl of Totnes

==== Marshals of Ireland ====
- Henry Bagenal was Marshal of Ireland from 1590 to his death in 1598. He was the son and deputy of Nicholas Bagenal who also held that position for many years. He spent his time in office trying to weaken the power of O'Neill, who had married his sister Mabel, much to Bagenal's contempt. During the war he attempted to contain the spread of the rebellion from Ulster. In August 1598 he set out to resupply the Blackwater Fort with 4,000 troops, but was attacked by Tyrone at Yellow Ford and killed.
- Richard Bingham was the longtime Lord President of Connaught, serving from 1584 to 1597. His brothers John and George were his assistant commissioners and the three men were much loathed by the Irish lords of Connacht, who blamed them for stoking rebellious fervor in the province. Following successive defeats at the hands of the confederation, he was recalled to Dublin and suspended from office. However, as the war grew out of hand he was recalled and appointed Marshal of Ireland in August 1598. He sailed from England with 5,000 troops but died of illness upon his arrival.
- Richard Wingfield was an English commander who was knighted in 1595 for his performance against the confederation. He was called away to the Calais expedition and upon his return to Ireland he succeeded Bingham as Marshal of Ireland in 1600. He was one of the signatories of the articles of capitulation signed between Spanish commander Juan del Águila and the Lord Deputy after victory at Kinsale.

==== Regional commanders ====
- Conyers Clifford was appointed Lord President of Connaught following Bingham's suspension. By October 1597 he declared that all of Connacht was pacified, save for O'Rourke. A widespread famine had assisted his success greatly and he built a patchwork of allegiances that started to unravel following O'Donnell's return to the province in late 1598. While marching north to resupply Sligo castle in August 1599, his company of 2,800 troops was ambushed by O'Rourke at Curlew Pass and Clifford was killed.
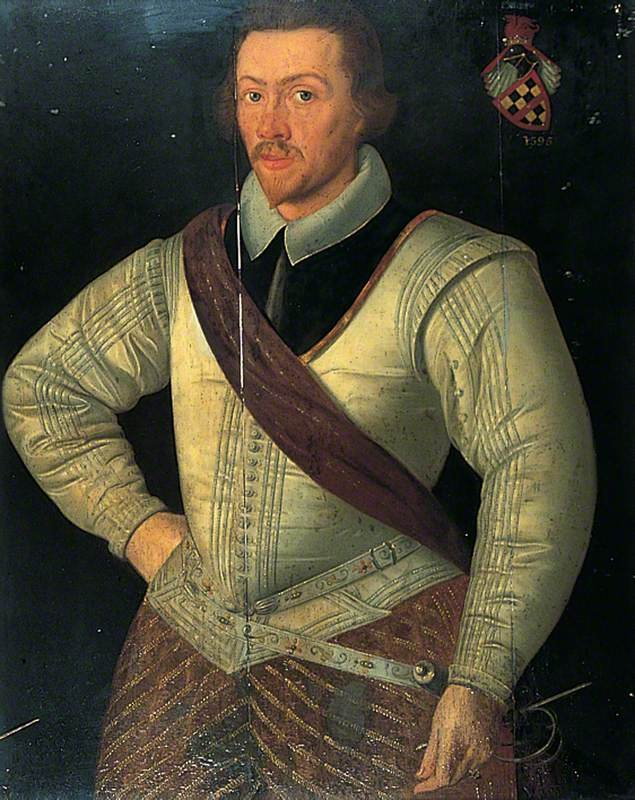
  Conyers Clifford
- John Norreys was England's most distinguished commander of that era, having fought in France, Flanders and the Netherlands. He was called to Ireland in 1595 to serve under Russell, however he refused as the two men were on bad terms, so he was instead given his own command. His work in developing relations and truces with the local lords of Ulster and Connacht, including O'Neill and O'Donnell, was ambitious and often unsuccessful, with Norreys claiming that Russell and others were undermining his work. He was sent to Munster in 1596 where he developed gangrene from his wounds and died in 1597.
- John Chichester was the governor of Carrickfergus, which for nearly 4 years had been one of only two English strongholds still standing in Ulster, the other being Newry in County Down. His cavalry operations in the area had aggravated the Scottish MacDonnells of Antrim who demanded reparations, and a parlay was arranged for November 1597. O'Neill used this opportunity to rid Ulster of the English and provoked a skirmish between the two sides during which Chichester was killed.
- Arthur Chichester was appointed governor of Carrickfergus in 1598 following his brother John's death. Carrying out Mountjoy's tactics with ruthless efficiency, he scorched the earth to induce famine and set up garrisons to fence in O'Neill's forces in Ulster. He has a divisive reputation for his conduct in Ireland, particularly in Ulster, where he was instrumental in implementing the plantations after the war, but was also the founder of Belfast in 1606.
- Henry Docwra was an ally of Essex who managed to survive the Earl's downfall and establish himself as a leading politician in Ireland. He is known for orchestrating one of the most decisive actions of the war, when he convinced Niall Garve to defect and allow 4,200 soldiers to land at Lough Foyle. He set up fortifications along the River Foyle which cut access between Tyrone and Tyrconnell. Following the war he founded the city of Derry along this river.
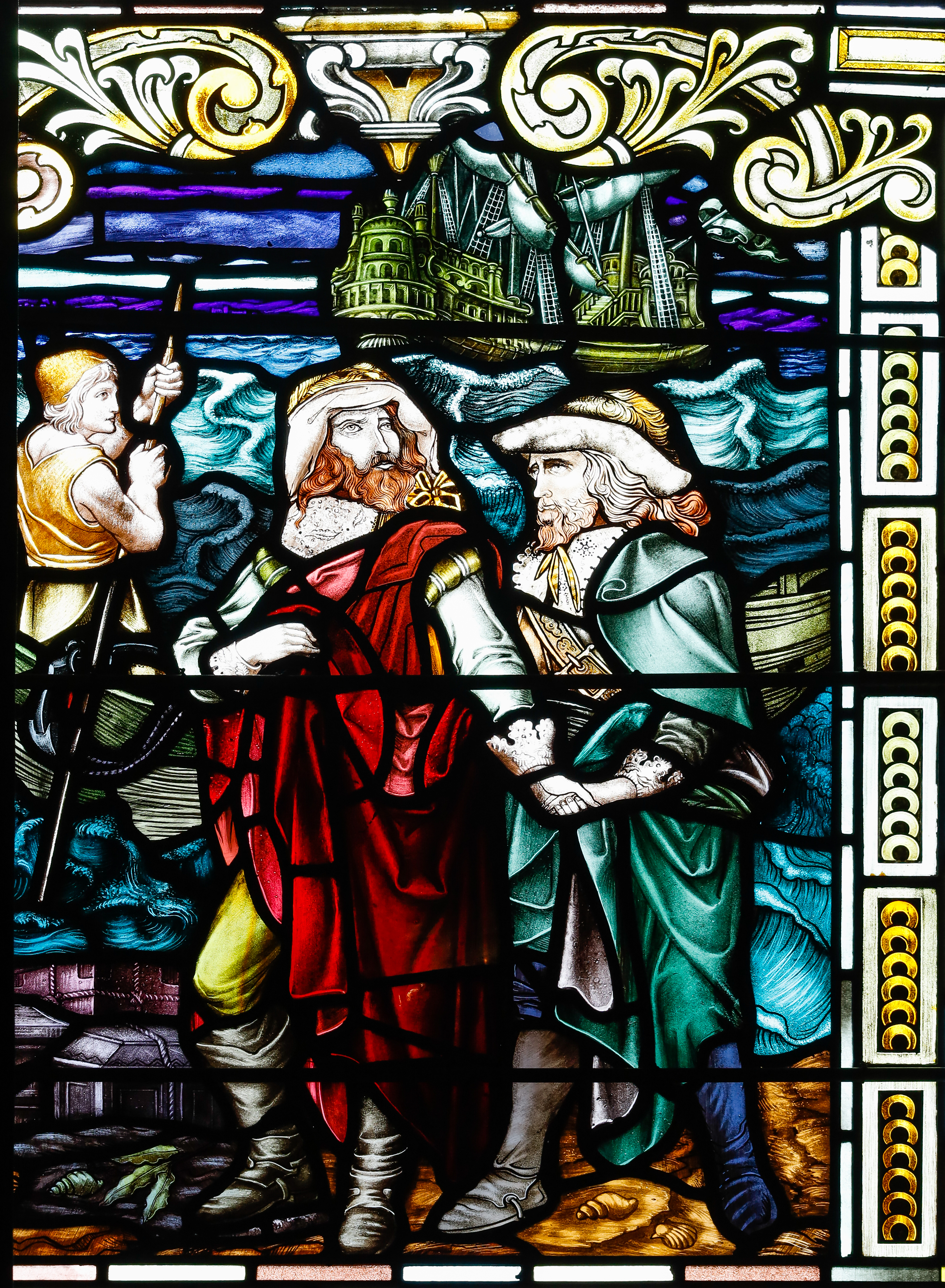
  Depiction of Henry Docwra's arrival at Derry.
- Thomas Lee was an aspiring army captain who was engaged in widespread and often duplicitous activities in Ireland. He murdered the ailing and elderly Fiach McHugh O'Byrne in 1597, and ransacked the towns and villages of Wicklow. He frequently met with O'Neill, initially amicably but would later orchestrate an assassination attempt on the Earl. He made numerous accusations against the Earl of Ormond, who he despised, and later endeavoured to overthrow. An ally of Essex, Lee attempted to ambush Queen Elizabeth and force her to sign a warrant to release Essex in 1601, but was apprehended and executed.

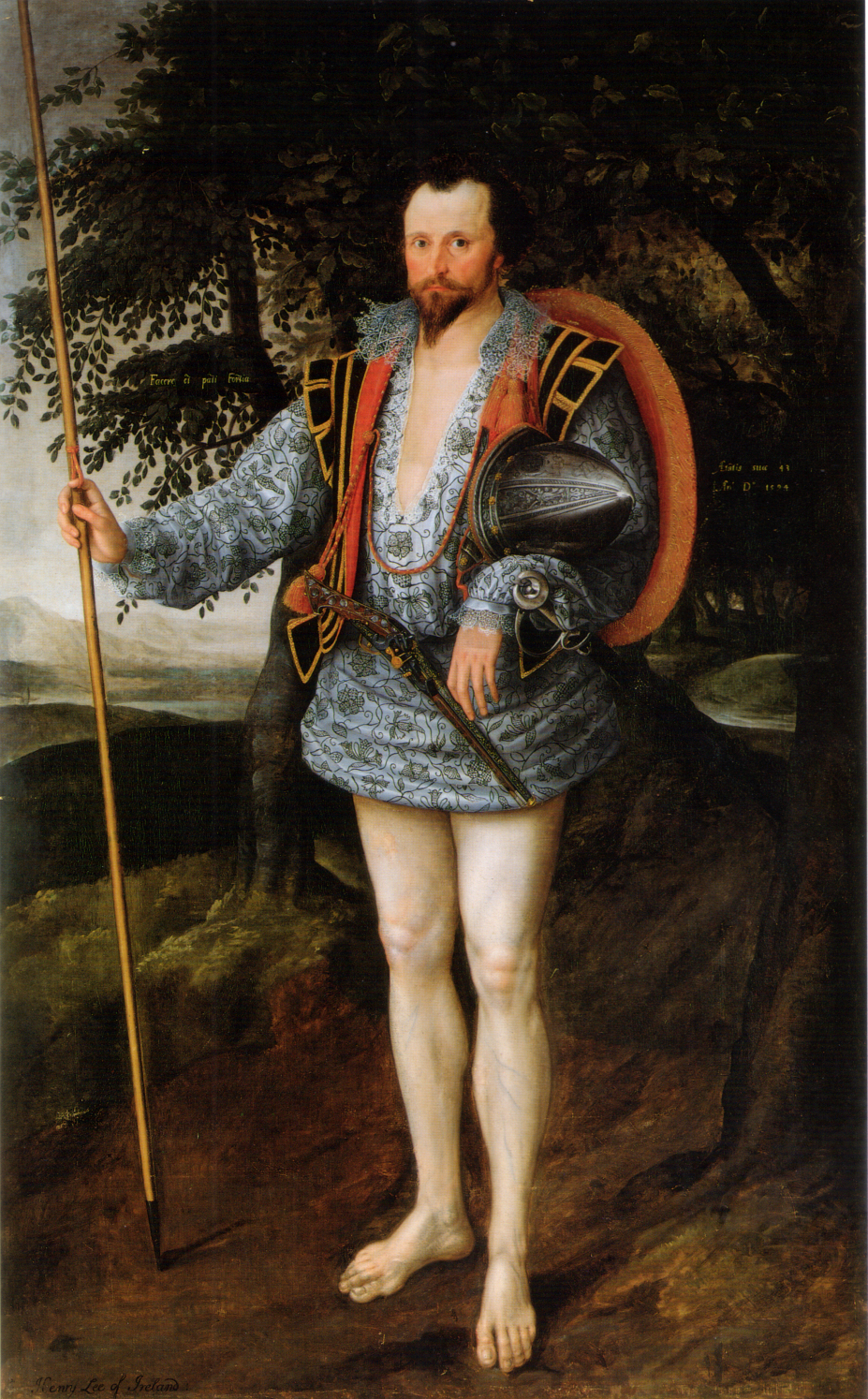
Thomas Lee

=== Irish and Anglo-Irish allies ===
==== Ormond ====
- Thomas Butler was the Earl of Ormond, Lord High Treasurer of Ireland and the most prominent Irish peer in England and Ireland at the time. Although he was traditionally one of England's most dependable allies, at over 70 years old his engagements were limited and often ineffective. Apart from minor skirmishes with the O'Mores in neighboring Laois his forces largely remained within Kilkenny for much of the war, and he frequently signed unilateral truces on behalf of his earldom with the Irish alliance. He was accused of treason by his political rivals for his conduct during the war, albeit unsuccessfully.

==== Thomond ====
- Donogh O'Brien was the Earl of Thomond and an avowed loyalist to the Crown. Upon the outbreak of war his first act was to march up past the River Erne into Tyrconnell and oppose O'Donnell. During periods of rebel advance his country was devastated and sympathy with the Irish cause was rife, however he continued his fight, gaining command of some of Ormond's forces. He played a prominent role at Kinsale and the subsequent rout of the rebels after the siege.

==== Tyrconnell ====
- Cahir O'Doherty was the Lord of Inishowen and just 15 years old in 1600 when the forces of Dowcra arrived in Tyrconnell. O'Doherty provided them with invaluable support and assistance which allowed the English to gain a foothold deep into hostile Ulster territory. For his actions he was knighted by Dowcra and hoped to become a courtier, but was caught up in accusations after the war and was eventually executed by the English following a short rebellion.
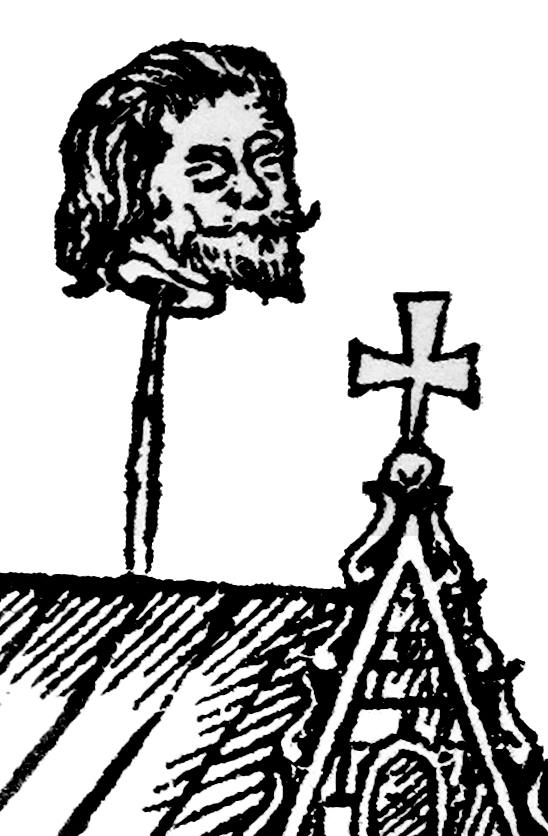
- Contemporary illustration of Cahir O'Doherty's severed head on a spike in Dublin
  Niall Garbh O'Donnell was a cousin of Hugh Roe O'Donnell and a rival claimant to the kingship of Tyrconnell. He ostensibly supported the rebellion but harbored a deep resentment of Hugh Roe and orchestrated the most devastating betrayal of the war in his quest of the kingship. He was tasked with securing the northern coast of Ulster while Hugh Roe and O'Neill were fighting elsewhere, but he instead allowed 4,000 English soldiers led by Dowcra to land at Lough Foyle, gutting the core of alliance territory. He then proceeded to capture much of western Tyrconnell and successfully fought off Hugh Roe's returning forces.

==== Kildare ====
- William FitzGerald was the 13th Earl of Kildare, one of the oldest and most respected peerage titles in Ireland. Thomas Lee alleged that he persuaded Kildare not to join the confederation, however this is most likely false. Kildare was in England during the outbreak of war and sailed to Ireland with Essex in March 1599 to combat the rebels, but his ship was caught in a storm and he died at sea.

==== Clanricarde ====
- Ulick Burke was the 3rd Earl of Clanricarde and an early opponent of the Irish confederation. He was made commander of the English forces in Connacht on 9 January 1599 but was unable to stem the tide of rebel victories and much of his territory was lost. He was present at Curlew Pass and died in May 1601.
- Richard Burke was Ulick's son and the 4th Earl of Clanricarde. He commanded English cavalry at Kinsale and came to power at a time when the balance of the war had already shifted in favour of the English.
- James Blake was a merchant and spy from Galway city who was twice involved in plots to assassinate Hugh Roe O'Donnell, first in 1599 and then in 1602. He was just a few kilometres away from Simancas when O'Donnell died of a tapeworm, however historians now believe it's unlikely that Blake was responsible.

==== Lower Mac William ====
- Tibbot na Long Bourke was the son of Grace O'Malley and a rival claimant to the kingship of Mac William Íochtar. He initially wrote of his support for the rebellion but was discovered and arrested. Following his mother's personal petition to Elizabeth in London, Tibbot was freed but was passed over by O'Donnell for the kingship in favour of Kittagh in 1595. He spent most of the war in exile in Galway but sporadically landed in Mayo to oppose Kittagh and his allies.

==== East Breifne ====
- Maelmora O'Reilly was the son of Sir John O'Reilly who ruled East Breifne from 1583 to 1596. Maelmora was raised in England and when his father died he was granted the title of Earl of Cavan in exchange for his allegiance to the Crown, although he exercised no control within his own kingdom. He commanded cavalry alongside Marshal Bagenal and was killed at Yellow Ford in 1598.

==== Iar Connacht ====
- Morogh na Maor O'Flaherty was chief of the Ó Flaithbheartaigh of Iar Connacht. He allied himself to Tibbot na Long Bourke and was engaged in negotiations with the Irish alliance in 1599, where O'Donnell unsuccessfully attempted to persuade the two men to join his cause.

== Spain ==
Irish nobles and Catholic officials had long been in contact with the Spanish monarch about the possibility of a Spanish intervention in Ireland. For their part, the war in Ireland was just one theatre in the larger Anglo-Spanish War (1585–1604) and was seen as an effective way of squeezing English money, resources and manpower which would otherwise be directed at Spanish possessions in the Netherlands.

O'Neill and a number of other Irish lords pledged their allegiance to Philip II, proclaiming him King of Ireland. They framed the war as a defence of Catholicism against the English heretics to curry favour with the devout monarch. This was a calculated and deliberate tactic on the part of the Irish, with Essex once quipping to O'Neill "thou carest for religion as much as my horse".

Actual Spanish commitment to Ireland and the Irish cause has been the subject of much debate amongst historians, especially given the lacklustre performance by the Spanish soldiers upon landing. While aid and financial support had been relatively forthcoming during the war years, the decisive defeat at Kinsale coupled with Spain's two failed armadas in 1596 and 1597 made it highly unlikely that they would attempt further landings in Ireland.

=== Spanish government officials ===
- King Philip II (until 13 September 1598)
- King Philip III (after 13 September 1598)
- Martín de Padilla y Manrique, Secretary of State and War (1597–1602)

=== Military commanders ===
- Juan del Águila was the Supreme Commander of the Spanish expedition to Ireland. He landed at Kinsale on 1 October 1601 with approximately 3,000 men and they fortified themselves in the area. del Águila distrusted the Irish and after just one engagement with the English offered to surrender, but was rejected. Following the war he was reprimanded by a Supreme War Council and was heavily criticized for his lack of communication with his allies, particularly when O'Neill launched an offensive against Mountjoy's forces to break the siege of Kinsale, during which del Águila's soldiers failed to take action and remained inside the town.
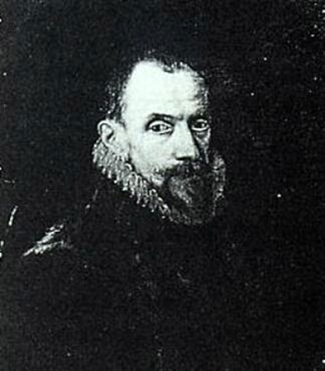
  Juan del Águila
- Diego Brochero was the admiral of the expedition fleet and landed a Kinsale alongside del Águila.
- Alonso de Ocampo landed at Baltimore, about 80 km southwest of Kinsale. His forces were aided by local lords who voluntarily surrendered their castles to the Spanish and they spread out across the coast to fortify it for future landings.
- Pedro de Zubiaur was part of the initial invasion force but was forced back to Spain by bad weather. He eventually landed on 7 December with 829 troops and reinforced the coastline. Not wanting to lose these positions, he afforded just 200 men to del Águila at Kinsale.

== See also ==
- Tudor conquest of Ireland
- Flight of the Earls
- Irish military diaspora
- Military history of Ireland
- Old English vs New English

== Bibliography ==
- Connolly, S.J. Contested Island: Ireland 1460–1630. Oxford University Press, 2007
- Cyril Falls Elizabeth's Irish Wars (1950; reprint London, 1996) ISBN 0-09-477220-7.
- Hiram Morgan (ed) The Battle of Kinsale (Cork, 2006).
- Emerson, R.W. The Journals and Miscellaneous Notebooks of Ralph Waldo Emerson: 1854–1861
- Hiram Morgan. Tyrone's Rebellion: The Outbreak of the Nine Years War in Tudor Ireland (Royal Historical Society Studies in History) (1999). Boydell Press, ISBN 0-85115-683-5
- Nicholas P. Canny The Elizabethan Conquest of Ireland: A Pattern Established, 1565–76 (London, 1976) ISBN 0-85527-034-9.
- Nicholas P. Canny Making Ireland British, 1580–1650 (Oxford University Press, 2001) ISBN 0-19-820091-9.
- Steven G. Ellis Tudor Ireland (London, 1985) ISBN 0-582-49341-2.
- O'Neill, James. The Nine Years War, 1593–1603: O'Neill, Mountjoy and the Military Revolution (Dublin, 2017)
- Stefania Tutino, Law and Conscience: Catholicism in Early Modern England, 1570–1625 (Aldershot: Ashgate 2007)
- Wager, John A. & Schmid, Susan Walter. Encyclopedia of Tudor England, Vol. 1 ABC-CLIO, 2012
- Wright, Thomas. Queen Elizabeth and her times : a series of original letters, selected from the inedited private correspondence of the lord treasurer Burghley, the Earl of Leicester, the secretaries Walsingham and Smith, Sir Christopher Hatton, and most of the distinguished persons of the period (1838).
