= Brian O'Rourke =

King of West Breifne
- Reign: 1566-1591
- Predecessor: Aodh Buidhe Ó Ruairc
- Successor: Brian Oge O'Rourke
- Born: c. 1540; West Bréifne, Ireland (now part of County Leitrim in the Republic of Ireland)
- Died: November 1591 (aged 50–51); Tyburn, London, Kingdom of England
- Consort: Annalby O'Crean; Mary Burke (sep. before 1585); Elenora Fitzgerald (d. 1589)
- Issue: Eóghan (d. 1589); Brian Óg (d.1604); Tadhg (d. 1605); Art; Eogan; Mary
- House: O'Rourkes of Dromahair
- Father: Brian Ballagh Ó Ruairc
- Mother: Grainne Ní Catháin
- Religion: Roman Catholicism

Sir Brian O'Rourke (Irish: Brian na Múrtha Ó Ruairc; c. 1540 – November 1591) was first king and then lord of West Bréifne in the west of Ireland from 1566 until his execution in 1591. He reigned during the later stages of the Tudor conquest of Ireland and his rule was marked by English encroachments on his lands. Despite being knighted by the English in 1585, he would later be proclaimed a rebel and forced to flee his kingdom in 1590. He travelled to Scotland in early 1591 seeking assistance from King James VI, however, he was to become the first man extradited within Britain on allegations of crimes committed in Ireland and was sentenced to death in London in November 1591.

== Early life ==
O'Rourke was a member of one of Gaelic Ireland's foremost dynasties, and was remarked upon as a handsome and unusually learned and well-educated Gaelic lord. The clan's territory was centred on the banks of Lough Gill and in the area of Dromahair in West Bréifne in the west of Ireland. Foundations of the O'Rourke tower house within its bawn wall and circular moat can be seen today at Parke's Castle, close to Dromahair.

He assumed leadership of his Irish clan in the mid-1560s having assassinated his elder brothers, but his territory of West Bréifne on the border of Ulster soon came under the administration of the newly created Presidency of Connacht.

Although the English knighted O'Rourke, in time they became unsettled by him. The English Lord Deputy, Sir Henry Sidney, described him in 1575 as the proudest man he had dealt with in Ireland. Similarly, the Lord President of Connaught, Sir Nicholas Malby, put him down as, "the proudest man this day living on the earth". A decade later, Sir Edward Waterhouse thought of him as, "being somewhat learned but of an insolent and proud nature and no further obedient than is constrained by her Majesty's forces".

== Connacht ==
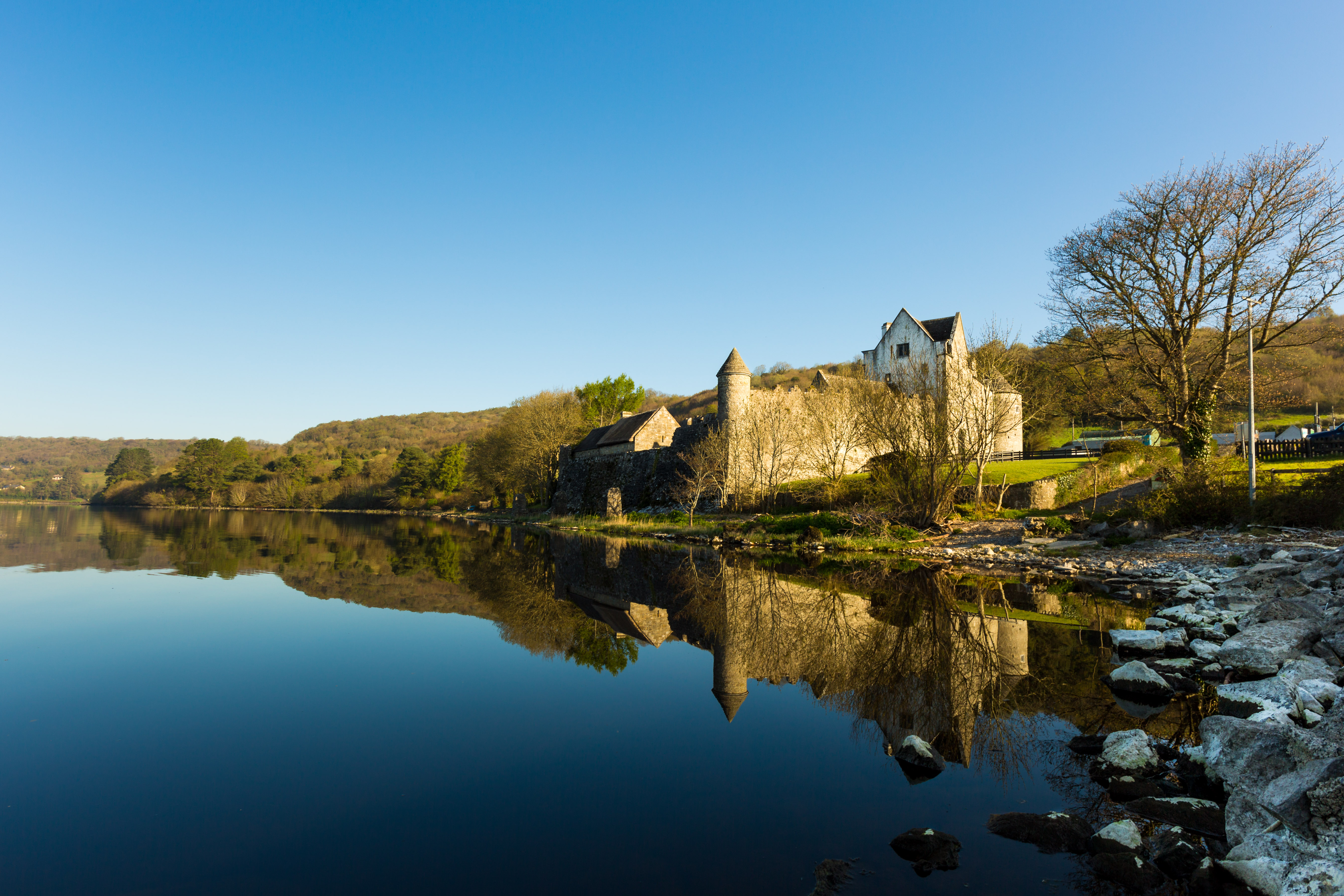
O'Rourke's Castle at Lough Gill.

O'Rourke was willing to deal with the government, and in an agreement concluded with Malby in 1577 he recognised the sovereignty of the Irish crown under Elizabeth I. But his allegiance was called in question within two years, during the Second Desmond Rebellion in Munster, when he rose out in defiance of the Connacht presidency. It was suspected his actions were induced by an involvement with the Old English family of the Dillons in adjacent Meath, who were engaged in an effort to spread their influence and possessions in the northern midlands, rather than by outright collusion in the rebel Geraldine cause. A further factor was almost certainly the August 1579 torture and execution of his son, Franciscan Friar Conn Ó Ruairc, by Tudor Army troops outside the city walls of Kilmallock under orders from Sir William Drury. Both Friar Conn and his companion in death, Bishop Pádraig Ó hÉilí, were Beatified in 1992 by Pope John Paul II, along with 15 other Irish Catholic Martyrs.

Sir Richard Bingham took up the presidency of Connacht in 1584, when Sir John Perrot was appointed lord deputy of Ireland. Ó Ruairc immediately complained of harassment by the new president in the spring and summer of that year, and in September Bingham was ordered by his superior in Dublin Castle to temporise and refrain from making expeditions into Bréifne. Although part of the province of Connacht, the territory was not subject to a Crown sheriff, and O'Rourke was happy to preserve his freedom of action. He did maintain relations with the Dublin government by his attendance at the opening of parliament in 1585, where he was noted to have dressed all in black in the company of his strikingly beautiful wife.

In preparation for the Composition of Connacht, whereby the lords of that province were to enter an agreement with the government to regularise their standing, O'Rourke surrendered his lordship in 1585. He was thus due to receive a regrant of his lands by knight-service in return for a chief horse and an engraved gold token to be presented to the lord deputy each year at midsummer. It seemed a balanced compromise, but O'Rourke declined to accept the letters patent and never regarded his terms as binding.

By May 1586 the tension with the president had mounted, and O'Rourke brought charges against him before the council at Dublin, which were dismissed as vexatious. Bingham believed that Perrot had been behind this attempt on his authority, but there was little he could do before his recall to England for service in the Low Countries in 1587; upon the president's departure (he was to return within a year), Perrot slashed O'Rourke's annual composition dues and, while permitting him to levy certain illegal exactions, appointed the Lord of West Bréifne sheriff of Leitrim for a term of two years.

== Rebellion ==
O'Rourke remained unhappy with English interference in his territories, and he was also content to be described as a leading Catholic lord. After Perrot's departure, he assisted at least eighty survivors of the Spanish Armada – including Francisco de Cuellar – to depart the country in the winter of 1588, and was regarded as friendly to future receptions of Spanish forces. Although not proclaimed as a rebel, he put up a forcible resistance to the presidency – again under Binghams's command – and would not be bridled.

O'Rourke's demands against the government grew with the violence on the borders of West Bréifne. In peace talks in 1589, he did accept the terms of a Crown tribute that had been agreed upon by his grandfather, but resisted the composition terms of 1585 and refused to allow the formation of a Crown administration in the new County Leitrim. Instead, he sought appointment as seneschal under the direct authority of the Dublin government, leaving him independent of Bingham. He also sought safe possession of his lands, safe conduct for life, and a guarantee of freedom from harassment by the president's forces of any merchants entering his territory. In return, the only pledge he was willing to give was his word. A member of the Dublin council, Sir Robert Dillon of the County Meath family, advised him to stay out – intimating that O'Rourke would be taken into custody if he came in and submitted to crown authority – and O'Rourke declined the government's offers.

== Flight and extradition ==
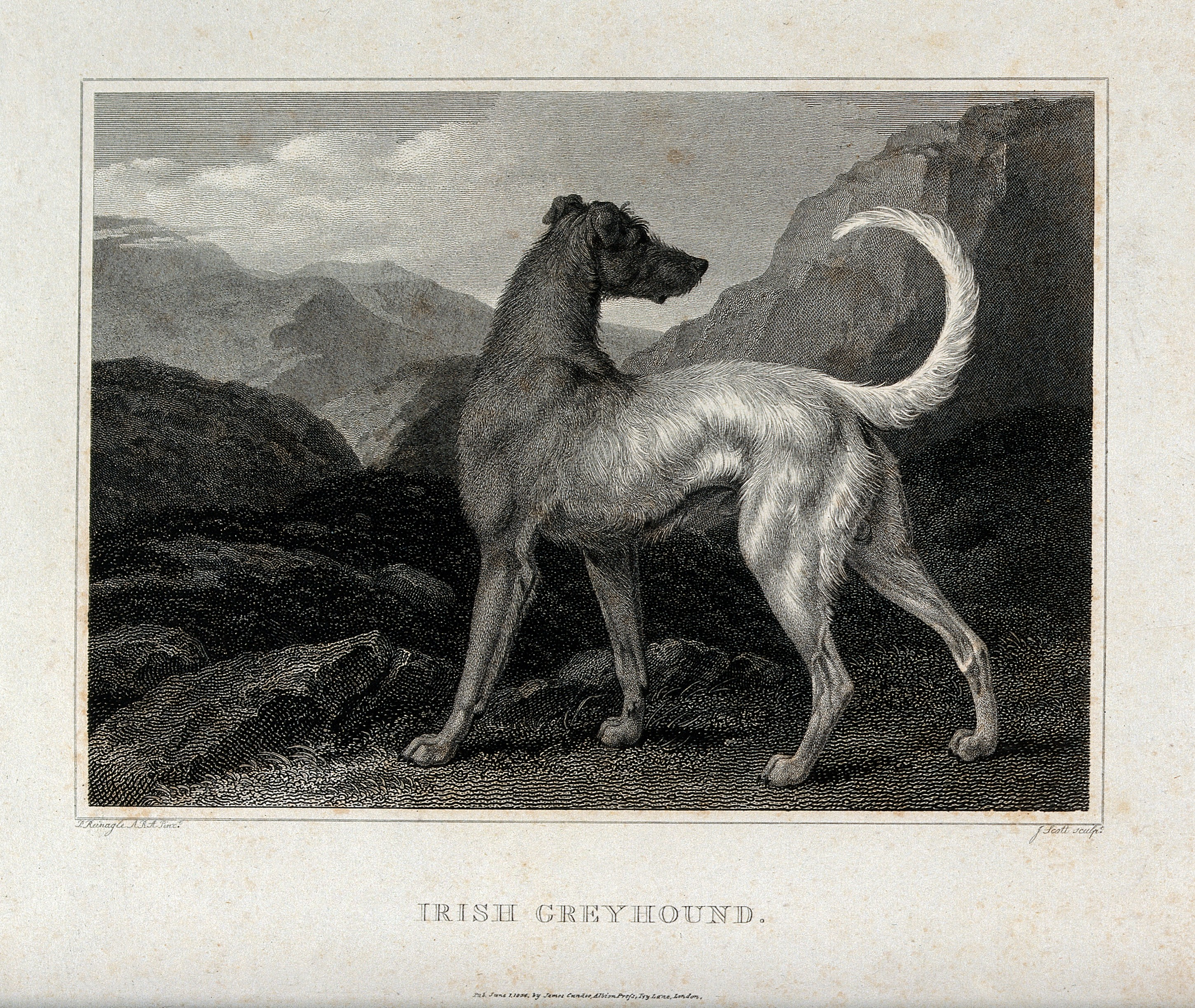
Four Irish Wolfhounds were brought by O'Rourke as a gift for the Scottish monarch.

Under the government of Perrot's successor as Lord Deputy, Sir William Fitzwilliam, pressure was increased on the territories bordering the province of Ulster. Thus, in the spring of 1590, Bingham's forces occupied west Breifne and O'Rourke fled; later that year the adjacent territory of County Monaghan was seized by the Crown after the execution at law of the resident lord, Hugh Roe MacMahon.

O'Rourke fetched up in Scotland in February 1591, with "six fair Irish hobbies and four great dogs to be presented to the king". He was seeking not only asylum but also the opportunity to recruit mercenaries to contest the occupation of his territories. In consultation with the English ambassador Robert Bowes, King James VI denied him an audience, and Queen Elizabeth (relying on the Treaty of Berwick (1586)) made a strong request for the delivery of O'Rourke into her custody.

The matter was put to the Scottish Privy Council, which readily ordered – in the face of some objections – the arrest and delivery to English crown forces of the rebel Irish lord. Elizabeth's councillors had explicitly held out the prospect of clemency for O'Rourke, and certain Scots councillors agreed to the extradition, in the supposed expectation that his life would be spared. The expectation was to be disappointed, an experience the king himself suffered in the years afterwards, when extradition requests for followers of the Earl of Bothwell were denied by the English.

O'Rourke was arrested in Glasgow, where the townsmen sought a stay on his delivery into custody, fearing for their Irish trade. The denial of their request caused an outcry, and the king's officers John Carmichael and William Stewart of Blantyre were cursed as "Queen Elizabeth's knights" with the allegation that the Scottish king had been bought with English angels (a reference to the pension the king received from England). Several of O'Rourke's creditors feared that his debts would go unpaid, but the English ambassador made a contribution of £47. O'Rourke was removed from Glasgow in the afternoon of 3 April 1591 in the midst of a riot. Two ships on the west coast were looted, and, after some crews had been killed by Irishmen in protest at O'Rourke's treatment, guards had to be mounted on all vessels sailing to Ireland.

== Trial and execution ==
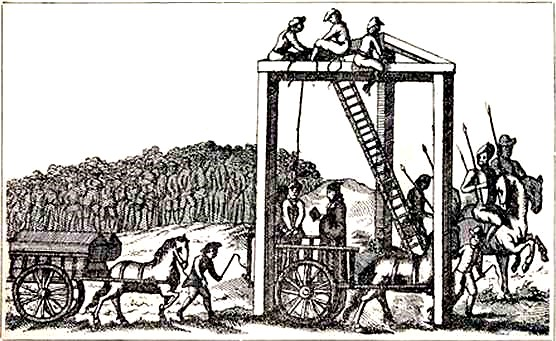
O'Rourke was convicted of "treason" and sentenced to death at Tyburn.

O'Rourke was transferred to the Tower of London, where he was kept in close custody as the legal argument began. Although treason trials in the Tudor period had more to do with political theatre than the administration of justice, the matter was not a foregone conclusion: there was a serious question over whether O'Rourke could be tried in England for treason committed in Ireland. The judges delivered a mixed, preliminary opinion, that the trial could go ahead under a treason statute enacted under King Henry VIII.

Meanwhile, articles had been framed at Dublin against O'Rourke with the reluctant aid of Bingham (curiously, he complained of being bullied into his testimony), and there was also an indictment laid by a jury in Sligo. These matters were transferred to England, where the grand jury of Middlesex found evidence of various offences of treason, the most substantial of which concerned the assistance given to Armada survivors, the attempt to raise mercenaries in Scotland, and various armed raids made by O'Rourke into counties Sligo and Roscommon. There was one further charge that related to an odd incident in 1589, when a representation of the Queen (whether a wood carving or painting is not known) was said to have been tied to a horse's tail at O'Rourke's command and dragged in the mud. This was referred to as the treason of the image, but it has been suggested that it was merely an ancient new year's ritual, deliberately misconstrued for the benefit of the indictment process.

O'Rourke was arraigned on 28 October 1591 and the indictment was translated for him into Irish by a native speaker. One observer said he declined to plead, but the record states that a plea of not guilty was entered (probably at the direction of the court). The defendant was asked how he wished to be tried and answered that he would submit to trial by jury if he were given a week to examine the evidence, then allowed a good legal advocate, and only if the Queen herself sat in judgment. The judge declined these requests and explained that the jury would try him anyway. O'Rourke responded, "If they thought good, let it be so". The trial proceeded and O'Rourke was convicted and sentenced to death.

In November 1591, O'Rourke was drawn to Tyburn. On the scaffold Miler Magrath, Archbishop of Cashel, sought the repentance of the condemned man's sins. In response, he was abused by O'Rourke with jibes over his uncertain faith and credit and dismissed as a man of depraved life who had broken his vow by abjuring the rule of the Franciscans. O'Rourke then suffered execution of sentence by hanging and quartering.

O'Rourke died sometime between 3 and 23 November 1591. Another source states he died in April 1591.

In his essay on Customs, Francis Bacon refers to an Irish rebel hanged in London, who requested that the sentence be carried out, not with a rope halter, but with a willow withe – a common instrument amongst the Irish: it is probable that O'Rourke was the rebel referred to.

== Legacy ==
O'Rourke Coat of Arms

County Leitrim

O'Rourke's experience as a rebel Irish lord is not remarkable in itself. What is remarkable is the combination used in his downfall: first, the campaign conducted under Fitzwilliam to bring pressure to bear on the borders of Ulster; and then the co-operation of the Scots king with the English, resulting in the first extradition within Britain and a trial for treason committed "beyond the seas". Evidence of his treason was used in the trial of Perrot later in the year, which also resulted in a conviction, and the subsequent pursuit of an aggressive policy against the lords of Ulster led to the outbreak of the Nine Years War. In the end, O'Rourke had fallen prey to forces that were moving to establish a new polity in Britain, of which James VI became the first monarch little more than a decade later.

His eulogy, as recorded in the Annals of the Four Masters, reads:

The death of this Brian was one of the mournful stories of the Irish, for there had not been for a long time any one of his tribe who excelled him in bounty, in hospitality, in giving rewards for panegyrical poems, in sumptuousness, in numerous troops, in comeliness, in firmness, in maintaining the field of battle to defend his patrimony against foreign adventurers, for all which he was celebrated, until his death on this occasion.

He remains an influential figure in the struggle of Irish lords against English expansionism in the 16th century, and was an early precursor to the generation of Irish nobles who would combat the English in the Nine Years War, which heralded the end of Gaelic Ireland.

O'Rourke remains one of the most common surnames within County Leitrim to this day. As a homage to the legacy of the historic kings of West Breifne, the county's coat of arms features the defaced crest of the O'Rourke clan.

== Family ==
Brian O'Rourke had at least six known children - Eóghan, Brian Óg, Tadhg, Art, Eogan and Mary.

O'Rourke's first two children were by Annalby O'Crean. She is described as being the wife of a Sligo merchant and it is not known whether she and Brian were ever officially married. They had two known children - Eóghan, born in 1562, and Brian Óg, born in 1568.

Brian's first recorded marriage was to Lady Mary Burke (a daughter of the second Earl of Clanricarde). They had three known children - Tadhg, born in 1576, and two other sons named Art and Eogan. O'Rourke and Burke separated sometime prior to 1585 but were never formally divorced. Tadhg, and possibly their other children, continued to live with their mother in County Galway following the separation.

O'Rourke later married Elenora, daughter of James FitzGerald, 14th Earl of Desmond and they had a daughter, Mary, who married Sir Hugh O'Conor, O'Conor Don. They later separated and Elenora remarried. She died in the spring of 1589. Based on accounts from Francisco de Cuellar who spent the Autumn of 1588 at O'Rourke's castle, Brian appears to have remarried once more, his wife being described by de Cuellar as "beautiful in the extreme".

== Bibliography ==
- Bagwell, Richard (1890). Ireland under the Tudors. Vol. 3 vols. London.
- O'Donovan (ed.), John (1851). Annals of Ireland by the Four Masters.
- Lennon, Colm (1995). Sixteenth Century Ireland – The Incomplete Conquest. Dublin. ISBN 0-312-12462-7.
- Ellis, Steven G. (1985). Tudor Ireland. London. ISBN 0-582-49341-2.
- Dictionary of National Biography 60 vols. (London, 2004).
- Schoales, Elizabeth (23 September 2004). "O'Rourke, Sir Brian [Briain Ó Ruairc; known as Brian-na-Múrtha]". Oxford Dictionary of National Biography (online ed.). Oxford University Press. doi:10.1093/ref:odnb/20845. (Subscription, Wikipedia Library access or UK public library membership required.)
