= Mary Burke (consort) =

Irish noblewoman (c.1560 – c.1627)

Lady Mary Burke (Irish: Lady Mary Ny Vryen, Lady Mary Ní Bhriain; c.1560 – c.1627) was an Irish noblewoman and consort of Brian O'Rourke.

== Life ==
Lady Mary Burke was born around 1560, the daughter of Richard Burke, 2nd Earl of Clanricarde and Margaret O'Brien, daughter of Murrough O'Brien, 1st Earl of Thomond. She was also known as Lady Mary Ny Vryen or Lady Mary Ní Bhriain, after her mother. She married Brian O'Rourke around 1575 or 1576. Burke was an ardent supporter of Queen Elizabeth I, and left her husband shortly after the birth of her son Teigue due to her husband's rebellious activities. The couple had two other sons, Art and Eogan. After the separation, she wished to marry John Fitzgerald, the brother of James FitzGerald, 14th Earl of Desmond, but he was killed in 1582. Instead, she married Theobald Burke, the eldest son of William Burke. They had four sons, John, Richard, Thomas, and Theobald, two of whom could have been twins. Her husband died in a skirmish with James FitzMaurice FitzGerald in 1579.

After she was widowed, Burke fought to secure rights for her family. She was granted custody of Burke's lands and their son and heir, John, in 1580. In 1582, she lodged a complaint with the Irish privy council that "She and her tenants [were] utterly beggared by the rebels", and she had to live in Limerick town, and was seeking "payment of the head money for killing James Fitzmaurice". She was living in poverty in Limerick but by July 1582 she has been paid 1,000 marks "in consideration of the killing of the traitor James Fitzmaurice". Remaining in Limerick, her son Teigue was educated there in 1592. Under her influence, Teigue was loyal to England during the Nine Years' War, and was granted three castles and 445 quarters of land in County Leitrim in 1603 by James I.

Burke's other children also remained loyal to England. Her son John died in infancy, and in 1600 Richard and Thomas were killed by Hugh O'Neill's mercenary captain Dermot O'Connor at Bunbristy Bridge. Theobald, her one surviving son from her second marriage, was favoured by James I who granted him large tracts of land across Ireland and created the title Baron Bourke of Brittas for him.

Burke married a third time, to Sir John Moore, of Bryes, County Mayo. The couple had at least two daughters, Mary and Cicely. They made provision for Moore's family in 1611, when Moore granted his lands to Donogh O'Brien, 4th Earl of Thomond "to hold for the use of John Moore the younger". Burke and Moore retained the castle of Clonbigney and six quarters of land in County Mayo for themselves "during their lives". The exact date of Burke's death is unknown, but thought to be in the late 1620s.
