= Burning of Dungannon =

Event during the Nine Years' War in Ireland

The Burning of Dungannon took place in June 1602 when Hugh O'Neill, Earl of Tyrone, abandoned and set fire to Dungannon, the traditional capital of the O'Neills. It marked the beginning of the final stage of Tyrone's Rebellion when the Earl became a fugitive, before his sudden reprieve the following year.

Following the defeat of his army at the 1601 Battle of Kinsale, Tyrone retreated into his heartland in County Tyrone, Ulster. Courted by the Crown, many of his allied Gaelic lords now changed sides, which turned much of the local population against him. Tyrone was faced with a three-pronged pincer movement with separate forces under Henry Docwra, Arthur Chichester, and Lord Mountjoy advancing on him from Derry, Carrickfergus, and Dundalk respectively. A major tactic of Tyrone's had been to avoid fighting pitched battles, preferring to retreat and ambush. He therefore decided to abandon the town and gave orders to torch it.

Soon after his cousin and enemy, Conn MacShane O'Neill, the son of Shane O'Neill, seized the castle and held it against the Earl. Mountjoy then occupied the ruins of Dungannon. Tyrone and what remained of his followers retreated into the Glenconkeyne Woods where he continued to evade capture. Despite his military defeat, Tyrone was restored to royal favour following political developments in London. The resulting Treaty of Mellifont gave Tyrone a full pardon and restored his territories to him. Tyrone then travelled to London to submit to the new King James I. Following the Treaty, the Earl repossessed his lands and began the rebuilding of Dungannon.

== Bibliography ==
- Bardon, Jonathan. The Plantation of Ulster. Gill & MacMillan, 2012.
- James O'Neill, The Nine Years' War, 1593-1603: O'Neill, Mountjoy and the military revolution, Four Courts Press, Dublin, 2017.
- McCavitt, John. The Flight of the Earls. Gill & MacMillan, 2002.
- Calendar of Manuscripts of the Most Honorable Marquis of Salisbury, Volume 12, 1910.
