= Teigue O'Rourke =

King of West Breifne
- Reign: 25 April 1603 – 1605
- Predecessor: Brian Oge O'Rourke
- Successor: Title abolished
- Born: 1576; West Breifne, Ireland
- Died: 1605 (aged 28); West Breifne, Ireland
- Burial: Carrickpatrick Monastery, County Mayo
- Consort: Mary O'Donnell (m. 1599)
- Issue: Brian O'Rourke; Aedh O'Rourke
- House: O'Rourkes of Dromahair
- Father: Brian O'Rourke
- Mother: Mary Burke
- Religion: Roman Catholic

Teigue O'Rourke (Irish: Tadhg Ó Ruairc; 1576 – 1605) was the last king of West Breifne from 1603 until his death in 1605. He was the son of Brian O'Rourke and Mary Burke of Clanricarde. Raised by his mother in County Galway, he lived most of his life in exile from his kingdom, looking for allies to support his claim as king of West Breifne in opposition to his half-brother Brian Oge O'Rourke. Having initially supported the Irish alliance during the Nine Years' War, he switched allegiance to England following the Battle of Kinsale in 1602. With the support of English forces he invaded West Breifne in 1603, ousting his half-brother and ruling as king until his unexpected death in late 1605 at the age of 28.

== Early life and career ==
O'Rourke was born in 1576. Shortly after this he was separated from his father and was raised in Galway by his mother and her family, the Burkes of Clanricarde. Under English law, O'Rourke was the legitimate heir to the kingship of West Breifne and, as a son of a wealthy pro-English family, was favoured by the crown government in Dublin from the outset to inherit his father's title. However, his father's chosen successor was his "illegitimate" half-brother Brian Oge O'Rourke, who was nine years his elder and lived with Sir Brian in Leitrim. Teigue's inheritance was thrown into further doubt when Lord President Richard Bingham, who effectively wanted to end the O'Rourke dynasty, occupied West Breifne in 1590 and ousted Sir Brian, who was executed for treason at Tyburn the following year.

By 1593 Bingham had been pushed back out of West Breifne by Brian Oge. Teigue moved to Tyrconnell at the outbreak of the Nine Years' War in 1594 and, despite his brother fighting alongside Hugh Roe O'Donnell and Hugh O'Neill as an ally, Teigue continued to petition them to support his claim as king. Although there is no evidence to suggest they ever seriously considered his proposals, he was useful to the Ulster lords as a threat with which to keep Brian Oge in line. Teigue's claim was such a concern to Brian Oge that he briefly switched allegiance to England from February to June 1598 when he received written English support for his claim from Governor Conyers Clifford. However, as Teigue's hugely influential family continued to push his claim, gaining backers like Lord Treasurer Thomas Butler, Brian Oge switched back to the Irish alliance believing the English assurances to be disingenuous.

Teigue was captured by Hugh Roe O'Donnell in early 1598. O'Donnell forced Teigue to marry his sister Mary, in order to formalise an alliance and antagonise Brian Oge. They had their first son, named Brian. By 1600 the Irish alliance was on the ascendancy and Brian Oge had proven himself a capable and indispensable military leader, whereas Teigue had been less successful on the field. Strength and valour were of utmost importance for a leader's credibility in Gaelic Ireland and the likelihood of Teigue becoming king dwindled. According to English officials Teigue "could not bring one man" under his command within the kingdom he claimed as his own. During his exile Teigue continued to make frequent contact with the English through mail:

"I pray the Lord that I may never enter the kingdom of Heaven if I do not spend my blood, flesh and all that I can get in the world to do Her Majesty's service."

Following a disastrous campaign in Munster in January 1601, where Teigue lost 500 of the 800 men O'Donnell had provided him, he returned to Tyrconnell and reconciled with his brother.

By late 1601 the Irish alliance had suffered a string of defeats and Brian Oge and O'Donnell travelled south to assist the 4th Spanish Armada which made landfall in Munster. When it became clear that the English forces were to be victorious at Kinsale (Teigue's cousin Richard was in Munster leading the English cavalry), Teigue moved swiftly with the support of the Clanricarde Burkes to seize control of West Breifne. Despite suffering defeat at Kinsale, Brian Oge returned to West Breifne in early 1602 and promptly ousted Teigue, who fled to Dublin.

== King of West Breifne ==
Teigue spent the remainder of the war in Dublin where he was welcomed by crown officials as heir. By March 1603 the Treaty of Mellifont had been signed by O'Neill and the war was effectively over. However, Brian Oge's West Breifne continued to hold out. Teigue was given command of 3,000 English soldiers by the government and was sent along with Rory O'Donnell and Henry Folliott to retake West Breifne at the end of March 1603. As a final obstacle to his kingship, Teigue's army was met with fierce resistance by Brian Oge's expertly entrenched forces, who prevented Teigue and his allies from crossing the Shannon and entering West Breifne for twelve days. When the defences were finally broken, Teigue's forces ravaged the countryside of the kingdom as Brian Oge and other chieftains loyal to him were holed up in their keeps. On 25 April 1603 Brian Oge fled and Teigue became king, although this was not formally recognised until September 1603 when King James I officially granted Teigue "the country or lordship of Breny Ui Ruairc and Muinter Eoluis".

The defeat of the Irish in the Nine Years' War heralded the end of the Gaelic Political order and the powers of the native kings were severely reduced. Due to extraordinary circumstances, Teigue was to be the last king of West Breifne. He died after falling terminally ill in late 1605.

== Family ==
Teigue was Mary O'Donnell's third husband. They had two sons, Brian, who was born in 1599 and Aedh (Hugh), who was born a year later. Upon Teigue's death, wardship of his two young sons was passed to his cousin Richard Burke. The heir, Brian, was sent to live with Burke. Mary O'Donnell remarried and settled in County Mayo, where Aedh continued to live with her. Brian eventually went to Oxford University and had a son named Brian before or during being locked in the Tower of London in 1619.

=== Family tree ===
Margaret O'Brien; Thomond	Richard Burke; Clanricarde
Annalby O'Crean	Brian O'Rourke; West Breifne	Mary Burke; Clanricarde	Ulick Burke; Clanricarde
Brian Oge O'Rourke; West Breifne
Hugh Roe O'Donnell; Tyrconnell	Rory O'Donnell; Tyrconnell	Mary O'Donnell; Tyrconnell	Tadhg O'Rourke; West Breifne	Richard Burke; Clanricarde
Mary Stuart O'Donnell	Hugh O'Donnell; Tyrconnell	Brian Roe O'Rourke	Aedh O'Rourke
