= Nine Years' War (Ireland) =

1593–1603 Irish war against Tudor conquest

- Part of the Tudor conquest of Ireland, the Anglo-Spanish War (1585–1604), and the European wars of religion
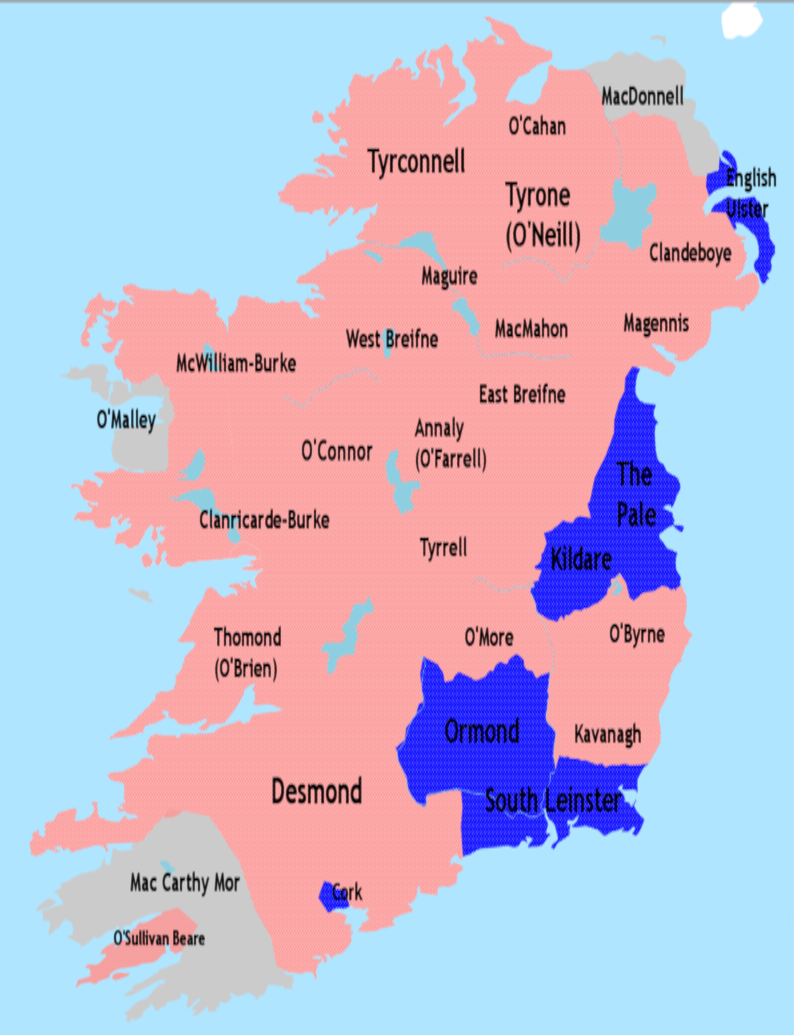
- Ireland in 1600 showing approximate Irish alliance control at its height (red), and English control (blue)
Date	May 1593 – 30 March 1603
Location	Ireland
Result	English victory: Treaty of Mellifont (1603); Flight of the Earls (1607); End of Gaelic rule in Ireland
Territorial changes	Entirety of Ireland placed under English control

Belligerents
Irish confederates; Spain	Kingdom of England and loyalists

Commanders and leaders
Irish lords: Hugh O'Neill, Earl of Tyrone; Hugh Roe O'Donnell; Hugh Maguire (DOW); Brian Oge O'Rourke; Fiach McHugh O'Byrne †; Richard Tyrrell (POW); James FitzThomas FitzGerald; Cormac MacBaron O'Neill; Donal Cam O'Sullivan Beare; Florence MacCarthy; Art MacBaron O'Neill; Tibbot MacWalter Kittagh Bourke; Spanish leaders: Martín de Padilla; Juan del Águila; Pedro de Zubiaur; full list...	English leaders: William FitzWilliam; Henry Bagenal †; John Norris (DOW); William Russell; Robert Devereux (Earl of Essex); Charles Blount (Lord Mountjoy); Thomas Norreys (DOW); George Carew; Henry Docwra; Arthur Chichester; Irish loyalists: Niall Garbh O'Donnell; Donogh O'Brien; Cahir O'Doherty; Ulick Burke (Earl of Clanricarde); full list...

Strength
c. 21,000, including: 8,000 in Ulster (1594) but thousands joined after; 9,000 in Munster; 3,500 Spanish (1601)	37,000 (total that served); 20,000 (peak strength)

Casualties and losses
100,000+ soldiers and Irish civilians (the vast majority died due to famine)	18,500 military deaths
- Total dead: 120,000+

The Nine Years' War (May 1593 – 30 March 1603) (Note: Unless otherwise stated, all dates before 1752 are given in the Julian calendar.) was a conflict in Ireland between a confederacy of Irish lords (with Spanish support) and the English-led government. The war was primarily a response to the English Crown's advances into territory traditionally owned by the Gaelic nobility. It was also part of the broader Anglo-Spanish War and the European wars of religion.

The Kingdom of Ireland was established as an English client state in 1542, with various clans accepting English sovereignty under "surrender and regrant". By the early 1590s, widespread resentment against English rule developed amongst the Gaelic nobility, due to the execution of Gaelic lords, the pillaging of settlements by appointed sheriffs and Catholic persecution.

The war is generally considered to have started in May 1593, when Irish lord Hugh Maguire revolted against the appointment of Humphrey Willis as sheriff of Fermanagh. Subsequently an Irish confederacy, led by lords Hugh O'Neill, Earl of Tyrone, and Hugh Roe O'Donnell, was formed to resist English incursions into their territory. Across 1593 and 1594, the confederacy utilised guerrilla warfare against royal forces in Ulster and northern Connacht. The confederacy won numerous victories against the royal army, such as the Battle of Clontibret (1595) and the Battle of the Yellow Ford (1598). By 1599, the war engulfed the entire island and took on a religious and nationalist dimension.

The confederacy suffered various military losses in 1600, such as the appointment of Charles Blount as Lord Deputy, the establishment of Henry Docwra in Derry and the defection of unsatisfied confederates. The confederacy were not able to secure Spanish reinforcements until the siege of Kinsale (1601–02), where royal forces decimated the confederacy. The war ended with Tyrone signing the Treaty of Mellifont (1603). In 1607, many of the defeated northern lords left Ireland to seek support for a new uprising in the Flight of the Earls, never to return. This marked the end of Gaelic Ireland and paved the way for the Plantation of Ulster.

The Nine Years' War was the largest conflict fought by England in the Elizabethan era and also its costliest. At the height of the conflict (1600–1601) more than 18,000 soldiers were fighting in the English army in Ireland. By contrast, the English army assisting the Dutch during the Eighty Years' War was never more than 12,000 strong at any one time.

== Name ==
Early historians disagreed on the date that the war began. The confederates called it the "eleven years war" in a letter to James I following their surrender. The 17th-century historian Philip O'Sullivan Beare refers to the conflict as the "Fifteen Years War", considering it to have begun in 1588 with the arrival of the Spanish Armada in Ireland. Standish James O'Grady coined the name "Nine Years' War" in the 19th century as he considered the war to have started in 1594.

Contemporary historians consider the war to have begun in May 1593 with Gaelic lord Hugh Maguire resisting the occupation of Fermanagh. The historian James O'Neill has criticised the name "Nine Years' War" and characterises 1593–1594 as a proxy war which England did not yet recognise the scope of until 1594. Hiram Morgan has used the term "Tyrone's Rebellion" to refer to the war, foregrounding the importance of the Earl of Tyrone.

== Causes ==
The Nine Years' War was caused by the clashes between the Gaelic Irish lord Hugh O'Neill and the advance of the English state in Ireland, whose control had expanded from merely the Pale to the whole of Ireland. In resisting this advance, O'Neill managed to rally other Irish septs who were dissatisfied with the English government and Catholics who opposed the spread of Protestantism in Ireland.

=== Rise of Hugh O'Neill, Earl of Tyrone, The O'Neill ===
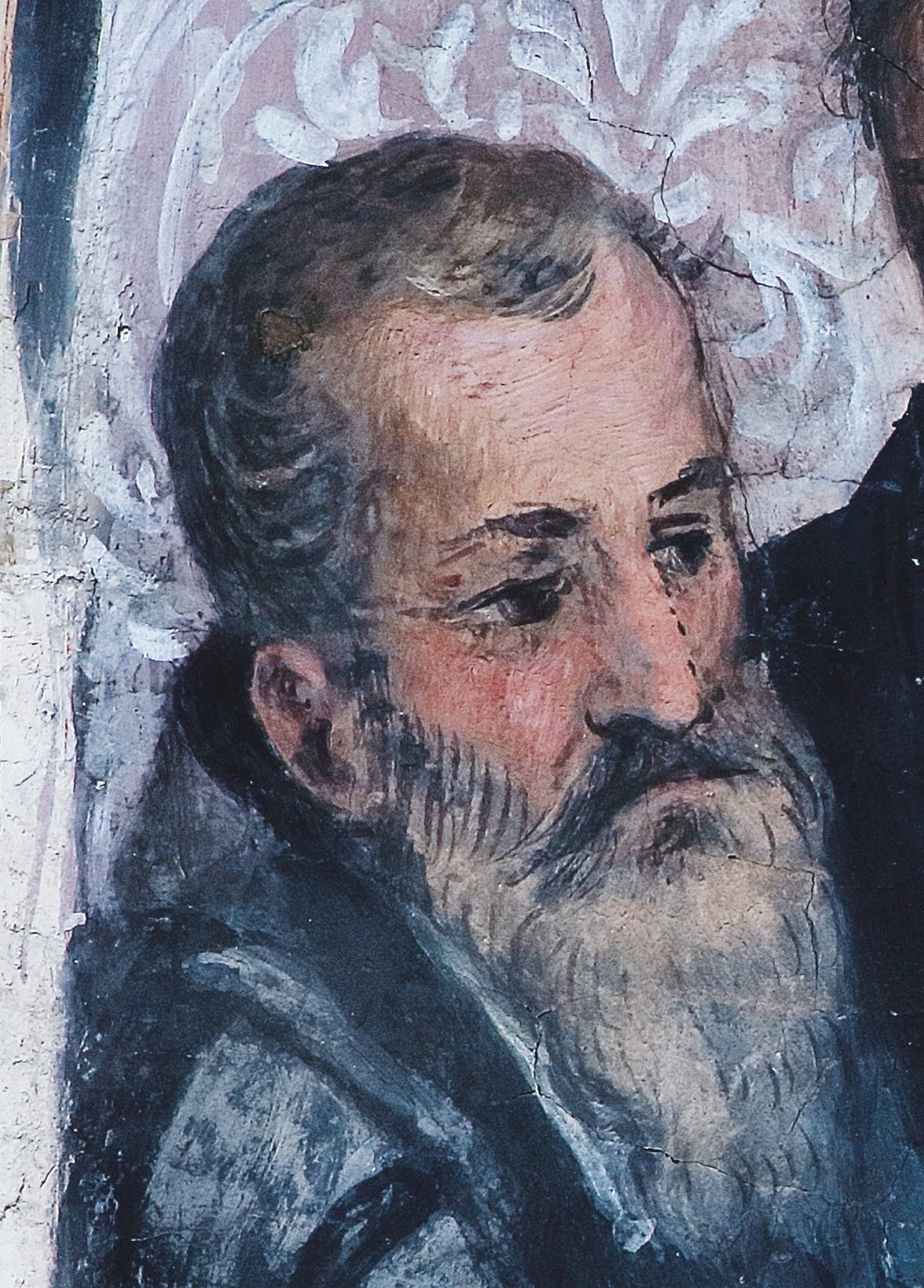
Hugh O'Neill, Earl of Tyrone, depicted in a Vatican fresco, c. 1610

Hugh O'Neill came from the powerful Ó Néill sept of Tír Eoghain, which dominated the centre of the northern province of Ulster. His father, Matthew O'Neill, Baron Dungannon, was the reputed son of Conn O'Neill the Lame, the first O'Neill to be created Earl of Tyrone by the English Crown. Matthew O'Neill had been appointed by Conn as his heir, whereas Conn's eldest surviving son Shane O'Neill was the preferred heir according to the Irish custom of tanistry. After a period of warfare, Shane had Matthew murdered and became O'Neill after his father died. After the murder of Matthew's first heir, Brian, the English authorities spirited the next heir Hugh out of Tyrone to be brought up with the Hovenden family in the Pale. At the parliament of 1585, Hugh O'Neill requested and was granted his English law birthright to the title of Earl of Tyrone. Prior to this and for several years afterwards Hugh O'Neill warred with the aging reigning chief of Tyrone, Turlough Lynagh O'Neill for control of Tyrone. Turlough died in 1595 allowing Hugh to be inaugurated "The O'Neill" against English wishes as this title was forfeited by him and his descendants. Hugh however had also ruthlessly murdered his chief competitor to the title, Shane's son Hugh Gavelagh O'Neill. He also had sub-chiefs who wouldn't toe the line murdered such as Phelim McTurlough O'Neill, lord of Killetra.

From Hugh Roe O'Donnell, his ally, Hugh O'Neill enlisted Scottish mercenaries (known as Redshanks). Within his own territories, O'Neill was entitled to limited military service from his sub-lords or uirithe. He also recruited his tenants and dependants into military service and tied the peasantry to the land to increase food production (see Kern). In addition, he hired large contingents of Irish mercenaries (known as buanadha) under leaders such as Richard Tyrrell. To arm his soldiers, O'Neill bought muskets, ammunition, and pikes from Scotland and England. From 1591, O'Donnell, on O'Neill's behalf, had been in contact with Philip II of Spain, appealing for military aid against their common enemy and citing also their shared Catholicism. With the aid of Spain, O'Neill could arm and feed over 8,000 men, unprecedented for a Gaelic lord, and leaving him well prepared to resist English incursions into Ulster.

=== Crown advances into Ulster ===
By the early 1590s, the north of Ireland was attracting the attention of Lord Deputy Fitzwilliam, who had been charged with bringing the area under crown control. A provincial presidency was proposed; the candidate for office was Henry Bagenal, an English colonist settled in Newry, who would seek to impose the authority of the crown through sheriffs to be appointed by the Dublin government. O'Neill had eloped with Bagenal's sister, Mabel, and married her against her brother's wishes; the bitterness of this episode was made more intense after Mabel's early death a few years after the marriage, when she was reportedly in despair about her husband's neglect and his mistresses.

In 1591, Fitzwilliam broke up the MacMahon lordship in Monaghan when The MacMahon, hereditary leader of the sept, resisted the imposition of an English sheriff; he was hanged and his lordship divided. There was an outcry, with several sources alleging corruption against Fitzwilliam, but the same policy was soon applied in Longford (territory of the O'Farrells) and East Breifne (Cavan – territory of the O'Reillys). Any attempt to further the same in the O'Neill and O'Donnell territories was bound to be resisted by force of arms.

The most significant difficulty for English forces in confronting O'Neill lay in the natural defences that Ulster enjoyed. By land there were only two viable points of entry to the province for troops marching from the south: at Newry in the east, and Sligo in the west – the terrain in between was largely mountains, woodland, bog, and marshes. Sligo Castle was held by the O'Connor sept, but suffered constant threat from the O'Donnells; the route from Newry into the heart of Ulster ran through several easily defended passes and could only be maintained in wartime with a punishing sacrifice by the Crown of men and money.

The English did have a foothold within Ulster, around Carrickfergus north of Belfast Lough, where a small colony had been planted in the 1570s; but here too the terrain was unfavorable for the English, since Lough Neagh and the river Bann, the lower stretch of which ran through the dense forest of Glenconkeyn, formed an effective barrier on the eastern edge of the O'Neill territory. A further difficulty lay in the want of a port on the northern sea coast where the English might launch an amphibious attack into O'Neill's rear. The English strategic situation was complicated by interference from Scots clans, which were supplying O'Neill with soldiers and materials and playing upon the English need for local assistance, while keeping an eye to their own territorial influence in the Route (present-day County Antrim).

== War breaks out ==
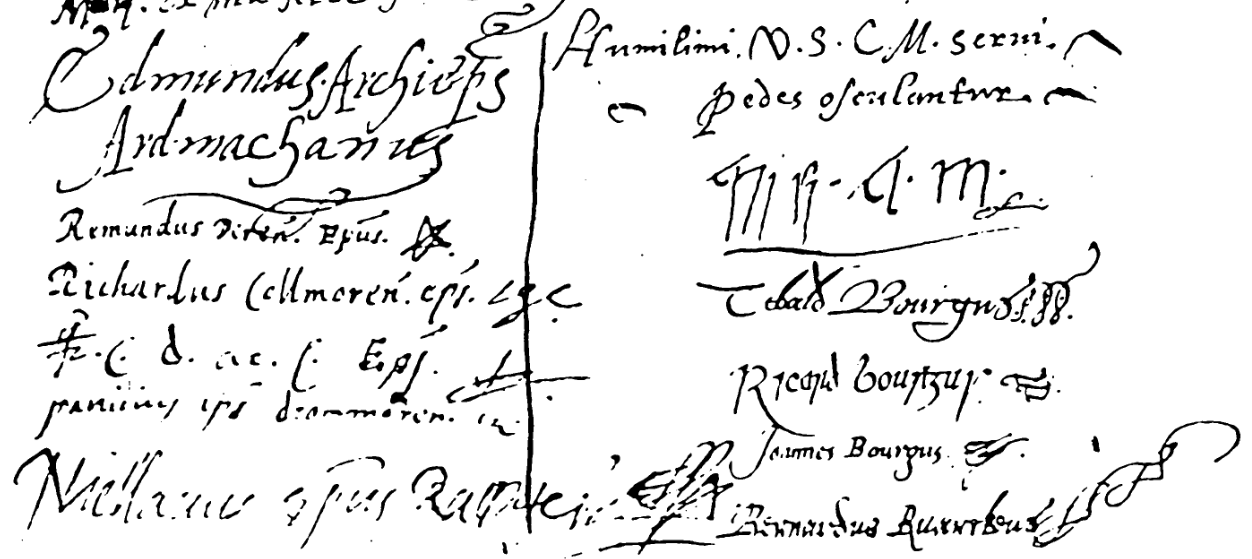
Signatures of the founding members of the Irish confederacy. Left column, top to bottom: Edmund MacGauran, Redmond O'Gallagher, Richard Brady, Cornelius O'Devany, Patrick MacCaul, Niall O'Boyle. Right column, top to bottom: Hugh Maguire, Theobald Bourke, Richard Bourke, John Bourke, Brian Oge O'Rourke. By this time, 5 May 1593, the bishops had selected Hugh Roe O'Donnell as "their leader or general". Tyrone allegedly attended the signing, though he did not take part.

In 1592, Hugh Roe O'Donnell had driven an English sheriff, Captain Willis, out of his territory, Tyrconnell (modern day County Donegal). In 1593, Maguire supported by troops out of Tyrone led by Hugh O'Neill's brother, Cormac MacBaron, had combined to resist Willis' introduction as Sheriff into Maguire's Fermanagh. After Willis was expelled from Fermanagh, Maguire, with the aid of MacBaron, launched punishing raids into northern Connacht, burning villages around Ballymote Castle. Maguire launched a more ambitious raid into Connacht during June, when he clashed with forces led by the governor of Connacht, Sir Richard Bingham, but the English were beaten back and Maguire continued to spoil thorough Roscommon before returning north. In response, the crown forces were gathered under the command of Sir Henry Bagenal, who launched an expedition into Monaghan, then Fermanagh, to crush Maguire and his allies, receiving his commission on 11 September 1593. Bagenal had under his command 144 horse, 763 foot, and 118 kern, to which O'Neill was to bring a further 200 horse and 1,200 foot. Bagenal entered Fermanagh on 22 September and was joined by O'Neill four days later. Unable to make a crossing of the River Erne, Bagenal and O'Neill marched (separately) northwards to the northern end of Lower Lough Erne. Blocking forces were posted by Maguire at the ford of Belleek, but these were overcome by Bagenal and O'Neill at the Battle of Belleek on 10 October.

Initially O'Neill assisted the English, hoping to be named as Lord President of Ulster himself. Elizabeth I, though, had feared that O'Neill had no intention of being a simple landlord and that his ambition was to usurp her authority and be "a Prince of Ulster". For this reason she refused to grant O'Neill provincial presidency or any other position which would have given him authority to govern Ulster on the crown's behalf. Once it became clear that Henry Bagenal was marked to assume the presidency of Ulster, O'Neill accepted that an English offensive was inevitable, and so joined his allies in open rebellion in February 1595, with an assault on the Blackwater Fort, which guarded a strategic bridge on the River Blackwater.

Later in 1595 O'Neill and O'Donnell wrote to King Philip II of Spain for help, and offered to be his vassals. Philip proposed that his cousin Archduke Albert be made Prince of Ireland, but nothing came of this. A truce in late 1595 was followed by the submission of Hugh Maguire in April 1596, and Tyrone promised to explain his conduct before the Queen in London, but the arrival of three Spanish envoys from Philip II in 1596 promising men and supplies ended any chances of peace. An unsuccessful armada sailed in 1596; the war in Ireland became a part of the wider Anglo-Spanish War.

=== Irish victory at Yellow Ford ===
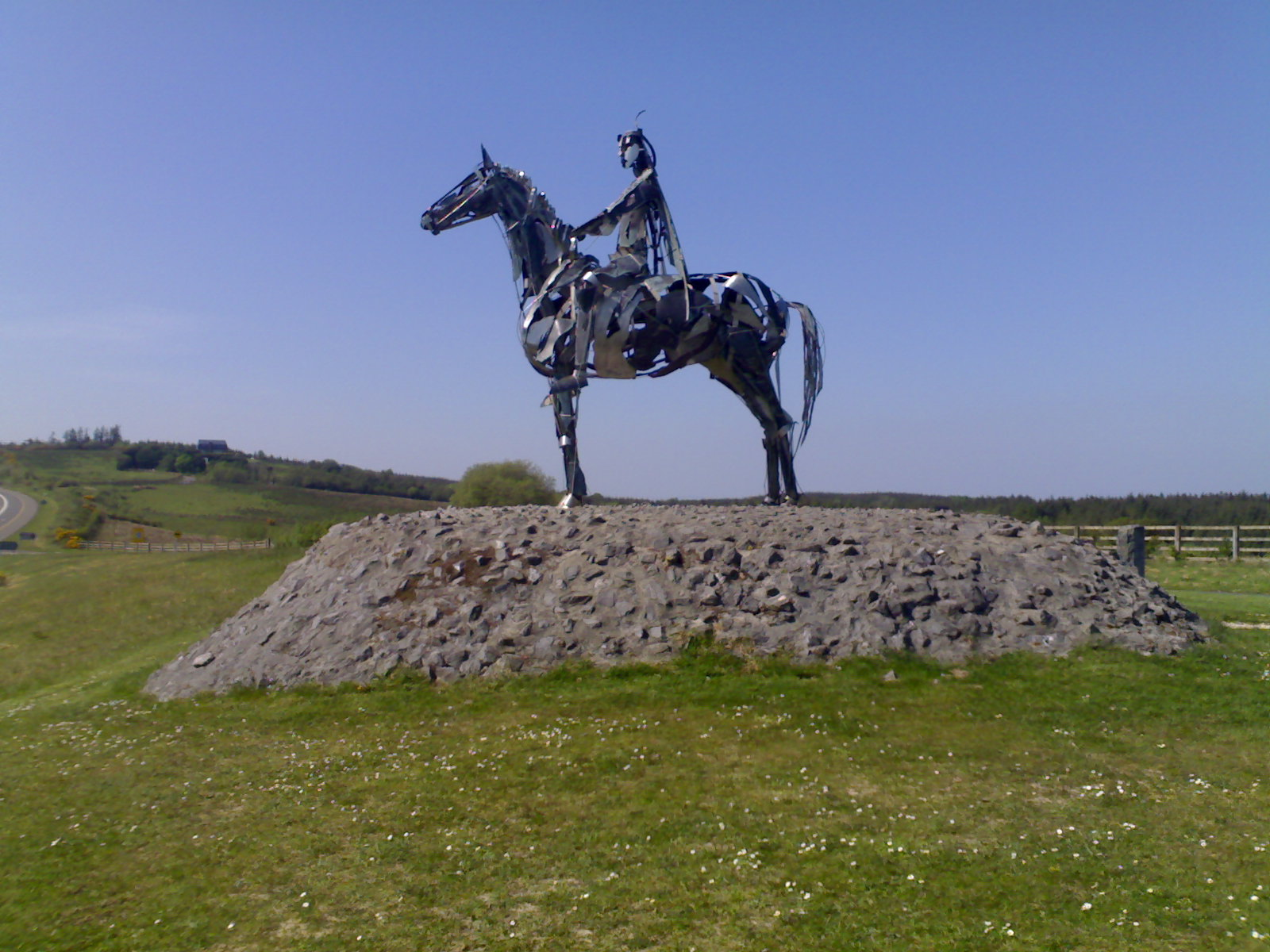
Statue of Red Hugh O'Donnell at Curlew Pass, County Roscommon commemorating the Irish victory over the English in 1599

The English authorities in Dublin Castle had been slow to comprehend the scale of the rebellion. After failed negotiations in 1595, English armies tried to break into Ulster but were repulsed by a trained army including musketeers in prepared positions; after a stinging defeat at the Battle of Clontibret, successive English offensives were driven back in the following years. At the Battle of the Yellow Ford in 1598 up to 2,000 English troops were killed after being attacked on the march to Armagh. The rest were surrounded in Armagh itself but negotiated safe passage for themselves in return for evacuating the town. O'Neill's personal enemy, Sir Henry Bagenal, had been in command of the army and was killed during the early engagements. It was the heaviest defeat ever suffered by the English army in Ireland up to that point.

The victory prompted uprisings all over the country, with the assistance of mercenaries in O'Neill's pay and contingents from Ulster, and it is at this point that the war developed in its full force. Hugh O'Neill appointed his supporters as chieftains and earls around the country, notably James Fitzthomas Fitzgerald as the Earl of Desmond and Florence MacCarthy as the MacCarthy Mór. In Munster as many as 9,000 men came out in rebellion. The Munster Plantation, the colonisation of the province with English settlers, was dealt a serious blow; the colonists, among them Edmund Spenser, fled for their lives.

Only a handful of native lords remained consistently loyal to either side, and loyalties were complicated by splits within clans. However all the fortified cities and towns of the country sided with the English colonial government. Hugh O'Neill, unable to take walled towns, made repeated overtures to inhabitants of the Pale to join his rebellion, appealing to their Catholicism and to their alienation from the Dublin government and the provincial administrations. For the most part, however, the Old English remained hostile to their hereditary Gaelic enemies. The English fortress at Castle Maine surrendered in November 1599 after a thirteen month siege.

=== Earl of Essex's command ===
In 1599, Robert Devereux, 2nd Earl of Essex arrived in Ireland with over 17,000 English troops. He took the advice of the Irish privy council, to settle the south of the country with garrisons before making an attempt on Ulster, but this dissipated his forces and he ended up suffering numerous setbacks on a desultory progress through south Leinster and Munster. He spent almost all of his time in Ireland awaiting transport that he had been promised before setting out, it being the only effective way of reaching his stated objective of Lough Foyle; however, a lack of administrative efficiency in England caused his plans to go awry and the requisite pack animals and ships were never sent. Those expeditions he did organise were disastrous, especially an expedition crossing the Curlew mountains to Sligo, which was mauled by O'Donnell at the Battle of Curlew Pass. Thousands of his troops, shut up in unsanitary garrisons, died of diseases such as typhoid and dysentery.

When he did turn to Ulster, Essex entered a parley with O'Neill and agreed a truce that was heavily criticised by his enemies in London, despite Elizabeth's admission soon afterward that it was "so seasonably made ... as great good ... has grown by it." Anticipating a recall to England, he set out for London in 1599 without the Queen's permission, where he was executed after attempting a court putsch. He was succeeded in Ireland by Lord Mountjoy, who proved to be a far more able commander, though his greater success could just as well have been because he was provided with all of the administrative support Essex lacked. In addition, two veterans of Irish warfare, George Carew and Arthur Chichester, were given commands in Munster and Ulster respectively.

In November 1599 O'Neill sent a 22-paragraph document to Queen Elizabeth, listing his terms for a peace agreement. These called for a self-governing Ireland with restitution of confiscated lands and churches, freedom of movement, and a strong Roman Catholic identity. In respect of Irish sovereignty he now accepted English overlordship, but requested that the viceroy "be at least an earl, and of the privy council of England". Elizabeth's advisor Sir Robert Cecil commented in the margin of the document, with the word "Ewtopia".

=== End of the Rebellion in Munster ===
George Carew, the English Lord President of Munster, managed more or less to quash the rebellion in Munster by mid-1601, using a mixture of conciliation and force. By the summer of 1601 he had retaken most of the principal castles in Munster and scattered the Irish forces. He did this by negotiating a pact with Florence MacCarthy, the principal Gaelic Irish leader in the province, which allowed MacCarthy to be neutral, while Carew concentrated on attacking the force of James Fitzthomas Fitzgerald, who commanded the main rebel force. As a result, while MacCarthy resisted English raiding parties into his territory, he did not come to Fitzthomas's aid, despite urgings from O'Neill and O'Donnell to do this.

In the summer of 1600, Carew launched an offensive against Fitzthomas's forces. The English routed Fitzthomas' forces at Aherlow and in November, Carew reported to London that he had, over the summer, killed 1,200 'rebels' and taken the surrenders of over 10,000. Carew also weakened Florence MacCarthy's position by recruiting a rival MacCarthy chieftain, Donal, to English service.

In June 1601, James Fitzthomas was captured by the English forces. Shortly afterwards, Carew had Florence MacCarthy arrested after summoning him for negotiations. Both Fitzthomas and MacCarthy were held captive in the Tower of London, where Fitzthomas eventually died. Most of the rest of the local lords submitted, once the principal native leaders had been arrested. O'Neill's mercenaries had been expelled from the province.

=== Spanish intervention and collapse of the rebellion ===
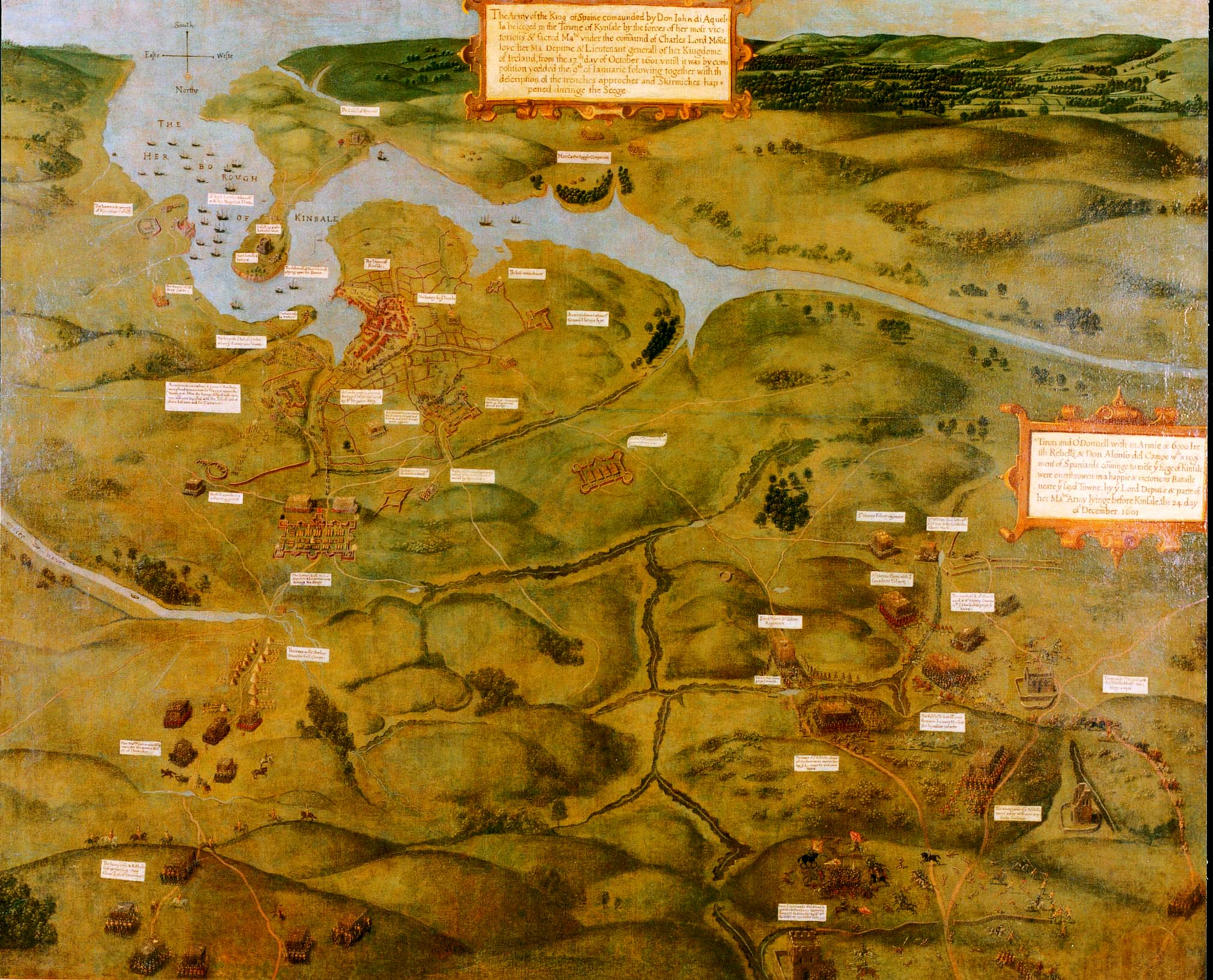
Map of the Siege of Kinsale

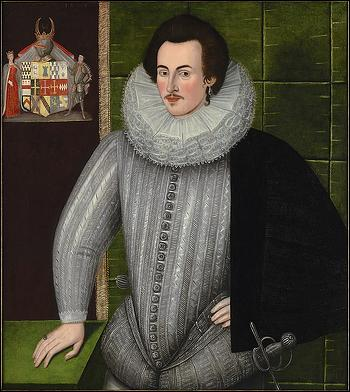
Charles Blount, 8th Baron Mountjoy, c. 1594

Mountjoy managed to penetrate the interior of Ulster by seaborne landings at Derry (then belonging to County Coleraine) under Henry Docwra and Carrickfergus under Arthur Chichester. Dowcra and Chichester, helped by Niall Garve O'Donnell, a rival of Hugh Roe, devastated the countryside in an effort to provoke a famine and killed the civilian population at random.

Their military assumption was that without crops and people or cattle, the rebels could neither feed themselves nor raise new fighters. This attrition quickly began to bite, and it also meant that the Ulster chiefs were tied down in Ulster to defend their own territories.

Although O'Neill managed to repulse another land offensive by Mountjoy at the Battle of Moyry Pass near Newry in 1600, his position was becoming desperate.

In 1601, the long promised Spanish finally arrived in the form of 3,500 soldiers at Kinsale, County Cork, virtually the southern tip of Ireland. Mountjoy immediately besieged them with 7,000 men. O'Neill, O'Donnell, and their allies marched their armies south to sandwich Mountjoy, whose men were starving and wracked by disease, between them and the Spaniards. During the march south, O'Neill devastated the lands of those who would not support him.

The English force might have been destroyed by hunger and sickness but the issue was decided in their favour at the Battle of Kinsale. On the 5/6 January 1602, O'Donnell, against the wishes and advice of O'Neill, took the decision to attack the English. Forming up for a surprise attack, the Irish chiefs were themselves surprised by a cavalry charge, resulting in a rout of the Irish forces. The Spanish in Kinsale surrendered after their allies' defeat.

The Irish forces retreated north to Ulster to regroup and consolidate their position. The Ulstermen lost many more men in the retreat through freezing and flooded country than they had at the actual battle of Kinsale. The last rebel stronghold in the south was taken at the siege of Dunboy by George Carew.

Hugh Roe O'Donnell left for Spain pleading in vain for another Spanish landing. He died in 1602 of a fever—it is often incorrectly alleged that he was poisoned by a double agent. His brother Rory assumed leadership of the O'Donnell clan. Both he and Hugh O'Neill were reduced to guerrilla tactics, fighting in small bands, as Mountjoy, Dowcra, Chichester, and Niall Garbh O'Donnell swept the countryside. The English scorched earth tactics were especially harsh on the civilian population, who died in great numbers both from direct targeting and from famine.

=== End of the War ===
In 1602 O'Neill destroyed his capital at Dungannon due to the approach of Mountjoy's forces, and withdrew to hide in the woods. In a symbolic gesture Mountjoy smashed the O'Neills' inauguration stone at Tullaghogue. Famine soon hit Ulster as a result of the English scorched earth strategy. O'Neill's uirithe or sub-lords (O'Hagan, O'Quinn, MacCann) began to surrender and Rory O'Donnell, Hugh Roe's brother and successor, surrendered on terms at the end of 1602. However, with a secure base in the large and dense forests of Tir Eoghain, O'Neill held out until 30 March 1603, when he surrendered on good terms to Mountjoy, signing the Treaty of Mellifont. Elizabeth I had died on 24 March.

Although the war had effectively ended with the signing of the Treaty of Mellifont, its final battles were fought during the English invasion of West Breifne in April 1603, which remained the sole holdout Irish kingdom following O'Neill's capitulation. The kingdom was ruled by Brian Óg O'Rourke, one of the alliance's chief lieutenants and leader of the Irish forces during the Battle of Curlew Pass. He failed to secure any concessions from the treaty as his half-brother Tadhg O'Rourke had fought with the English during the war and was granted lordship of West Breifne in return. Following a twelve-day siege, a force of 3,000 men led by Tadhg, Henry Folliott, and Rory O'Donnell eventually brought the area, and thus all of Ireland, under English control on 25 April 1603.

== Aftermath ==
The leaders of the rebellion received good terms from the new King of England, James I, in the hope of ensuring a final end of the draining war that had brought England close to bankruptcy. O'Neill, O'Donnell, and the other surviving Ulster chiefs were granted full pardons and the return of their estates. The stipulations were that they abandon their Irish titles, their private armies, and their control over their dependents, and that they swear loyalty only to the Crown of England. In 1604, Mountjoy declared an amnesty for rebels all over the country. The reason for this apparent mildness was that the English could not afford to continue the war any longer. Elizabethan England did not have a standing army, nor could it force its Parliament to pass enough taxation to pay for long wars. Moreover, it was already involved in a war in the Spanish Netherlands. As it was, the war in Ireland (which cost over £2 million) came very close to bankrupting the English exchequer by its end in 1603.

Irish sources claimed that as many as 60,000 people had died in the Ulster famine of 1602–03 alone. An Irish death toll of over 100,000 is possible. At least 30,000 English soldiers died in Ireland in the Nine Years' War, mainly from disease. So the total death toll for the war was certainly at least 100,000 people, and probably more.

Although O'Neill and his allies received good terms at the end of the war, they were never trusted by the English authorities and the distrust was mutual. O'Neill, O'Donnell, and the other Gaelic lords from Ulster allied to them left Ireland in 1607 in what is known as the "Flight of the Earls" after news they planned another rebellion reached the authorities. They intended to organise an expedition from a Catholic power in Europe, preferably Spain, to restart the war but were unable to find any military backers.

Spain had signed the Treaty of London in August 1604 with the new Stuart dynasty and did not wish to reopen hostilities. Further, a Spanish fleet had just been destroyed by a Dutch fleet in the Battle of Gibraltar in April 1607. In 1608 Sir Cahir O'Doherty, who had previously fought on the Crown's side against Tyrone, launched O'Doherty's Rebellion when he attacked and burnt Derry. O'Doherty was defeated and killed at the Battle of Kilmacrennan and the rebellion quickly collapsed.

In 1608 the absent earls' lands were confiscated for trying to start another war, and were soon colonised in the Plantation of Ulster. The Nine Years' War was therefore an important step in the English and Scottish colonisation of Ulster.

The war was especially devastating financially, costing the government £1.131 million when the annual royal revenue was about £300,000 in 1600.

== List of battles ==
- 1593 – Battle of Belleek
- 1594 – Siege of Enniskillen
- 1594 – Battle of the Ford of the Biscuits
- 1595 – Battle of Clontibret
- 1596 – Third Sack of Athenry
- 1596 – Siege of Galway, Sack of Bohermore
- 1597 – Battle of Casan-na-gCuradh
- 1597 – Battle of Tyrrellspass
- 1597 – Battle of Carrickfergus
- 1598 – Battle of the Yellow Ford
- 1599 – Siege of Cahir Castle
- 1599 – Battle of Deputy's Pass
- 1599 – Battle of Curlew Pass
- 1600 – Battle of Moyry Pass
- 1600 – Battle of Lifford
- 1601 – Siege of Donegal
- 1601 - Fourth Spanish Armada
  - 1601 – Battle of Castlehaven
  - 1601 – Battle of Kinsale
- 1602 – Siege of Dunboy
- 1602 – Burning of Dungannon

== See also ==
- Grace O'Malley
- List of Irish uprisings
- Tudor conquest of Ireland
- Anglo-Spanish War (1585–1604)
- Williamite War in Ireland
- Tudor period, perspective from English history
