= Brian Oge O'Rourke =

- O'Rourke's signature, 1593

King of West Breifne
- Reign: 3 November 1591 – 25 April 1603
- Predecessor: Brian O'Rourke
- Successor: Teigue O'Rourke
- Born: c. 1568; West Breifne, Ireland
- Died: 28 January 1604 (aged 35–36); Ross Errilly Friary, Ireland
- Burial: Ross Errilly Friary
- Consort: Mary Maguire
- House: O'Rourkes of Dromahair
- Father: Brian O'Rourke
- Mother: Annably O'Credan
- Religion: Roman Catholicism
- Education: New College, Oxford

Brian Oge O'Rourke (Irish: Brian Óg na Samhthach Ó Ruairc; c. 1568 – 28 January 1604), was an Irish nobleman and military commander. He was a founding member of the confederacy of Irish lords which opposed English rule in the Nine Years' War. He was the penultimate ruler of the Gaelic kingdom of West Breifne from 1591 until his overthrow in April 1603.

== Early life and education ==
O'Rourke was born circa 1568 in Ireland, the oldest known legitimate son of Sir Brian O'Rourke, the Gaelic Irish ruler of West Breifne, and Annably O'Credan. His maternal grandfather was John O'Credan, a merchant from Sligo. He had a legitimate half-brother, Teigue O'Rourke.

In 1584, O'Rourke was dispatched to New College, Oxford, for his education by Lord Deputy John Perrot. While studying there he incurred several debts as his father failed to pay for his upkeep. His education ended in 1588, when his father arranged for a friend, Charles Travers, to smuggle O'Rourke out of England and back to Leitrim. He was back in Ireland by 1589.

== Military career ==
O'Rourke's father rebelled against the English Crown in April 1589. O'Rourke subsequently led troops throughout northern Connacht in 1589–90 to support his father. However the revolt ended in the O'Rourke clan's defeat, and O'Rourke and his father were driven into exile in Tyrconnell.

Due to the successive deaths of both his older brother Eoghan in 1589 and his father Brian O'Rourke, who was executed in London in 1591, Brian Oge was thrust into the leadership of his kingdom at just 23 years old. In 1599, O'Rourke's forces fought alongside those of Hugh Roe O'Donnell at the Battle of Curlew Pass, during the Nine Years' War. His forces, along with those of Hugh O'Neill, 2nd Earl of Tyrone, were still sufficiently menacing to Queen Elizabeth I that she was persuaded to agree to a peace in Ireland - the Treaty of Mellifont.

Brian Oge O'Rourke was a founding member of the Irish confederacy.

O'Rourke was the last Irish king to be defeated in the war, roughly a month after the others had surrendered. He never surrendered, but was ousted by his brother Teigue, who had defected to the English during the war and with their support invaded his kingdom in March 1603.

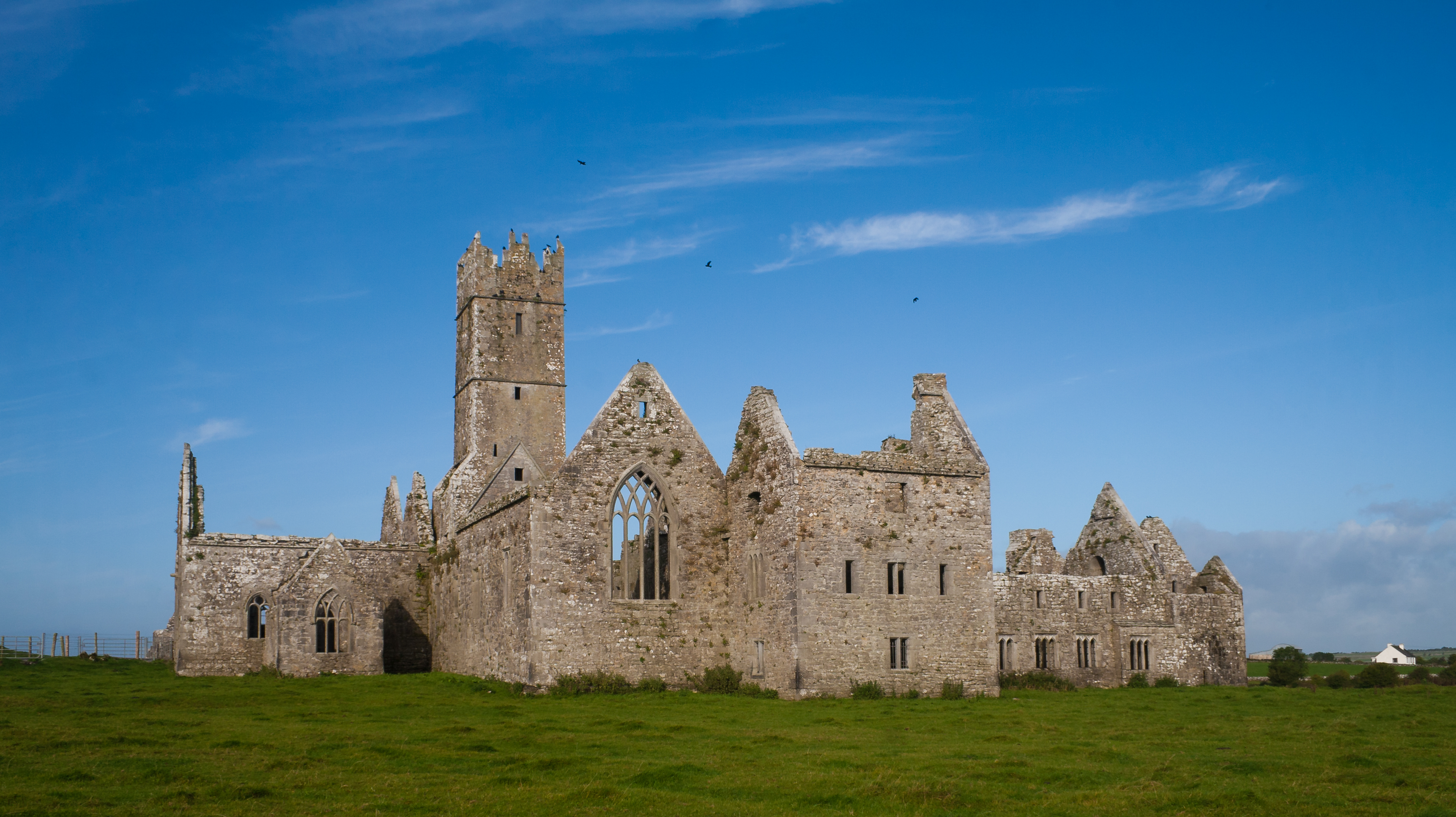
O'Rourke sought refuge in Ross Errilly Friary; he died and was buried there.

O'Rourke fled to County Galway, hiding in the Franciscan monastery of the Ross Errilly Friary, where he died of fever on 28 January 1604. He was buried there. He was succeeded as chief by his brother Teigue.
