= Treaty of Mellifont =

1603 treaty ending the Nine Years' War in Ireland

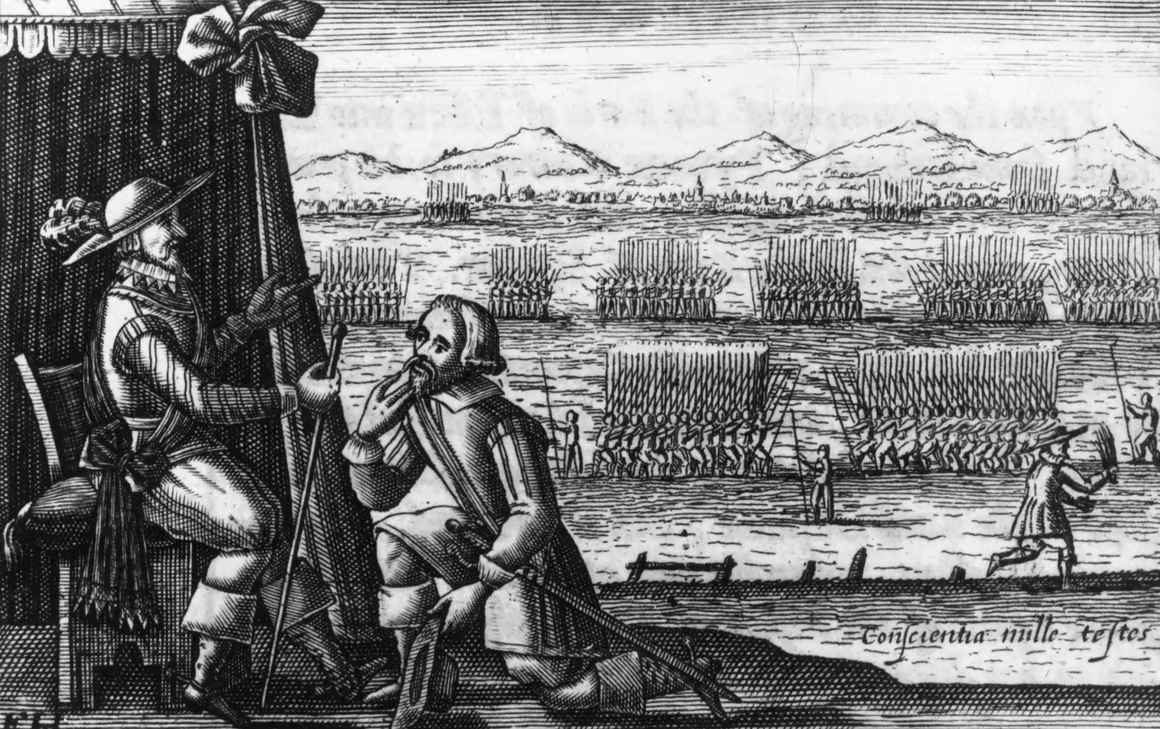
18th-century depiction of Tyrone's submission to Mountjoy

The Treaty of Mellifont (Irish: Conradh na Mainistreach Móire), also known as the Articles of Mellifont, was signed in 1603, ending the Nine Years' War which took place in Ireland from 1593 to 1603.

== End of war ==
Following the English victory in the Battle of Kinsale, the leaders fighting in Cork returned to protect their homelands. The Lord Deputy of Ireland, Charles Blount, 8th Baron Mountjoy, had succeeded where his predecessor, Robert Devereux, 2nd Earl of Essex, had failed. However, Mountjoy knew that, while still in hiding, Hugh O'Neill remained a threat. Although most of the lesser chiefs allied with him had been compelled to submit, Rory O'Donnell, Brian Oge O'Rourke, Cuchonnacht Maguire (brother of Hugh Maguire), and Donal Cam O'Sullivan Beare remained loyal to The Great Earl.

During the spring of 1603, Lord Mountjoy concentrated his campaign in the northern counties and the province of Leinster. He ordered all land be scorched. Harvests and stock were destroyed and famine soon prevailed. Mountjoy and the English Privy Council had long urged Queen Elizabeth I of England to make peace. The war was costing three quarters of the Exchequer's annual revenue, and the aged Queen had been obliged to maintain an army of 20,000 men for several years past.

By contrast, the English army assisting the Dutch during the Eighty Years' War was never more than 12,000 strong Horrified by the cost of the war, Elizabeth now dropped her insistence on unconditional surrender and authorised Mountjoy to treat with The O'Neill upon honourable terms.

== Negotiations ==
The agents employed by the Lord Deputy in the negotiations were Sir William Godolphin and Sir Garrett Moore, an ancestor of the Marquesses of Drogheda. Moore, a personal friend of O'Neill, found him in early March at his retreat near Lough Neagh and persuaded him that he should negotiate peace terms, and would travel under a safe conduct.

Negotiations were conducted at Mellifont, near Drogheda in County Louth. This was Sir Garret's seat, which had been sold to his family following the dissolution of the Cistercian abbey.

On 27 March 1603, Mountjoy received news that the Queen had died in London three days earlier, but he kept that information from the other parties until 5 April. Delaying the news had no legal effect, because of the principle of the demise of the Crown and the lack of an interregnum, but it might have caused a further delay if the new King James had wanted to appoint different negotiators.

== Terms ==
On 30 March, Tyrone submitted to the Crown. The pardon and the terms were considered to be very generous at the time:

- In return for renouncing the Gaelic title, Uí Néill (in English: The O'Neill), the attainder that had stripped him of the title of Earl of Tyrone was reversed, allowing him a seat in the Irish House of Lords.
- He retained his traditional core territory, apart from any Church lands, which was held in freehold title under English property law.
- The Earl of Tyrone swore to be loyal to the Crown and not to seek further assistance from foreign power. In return, he received a pardon.
- Brehon law was to be replaced in his lands with English law.
- The earls were no longer permitted to support the Gaelic bards.
- English would be the official language.
- Catholic colleges could not be built on his property.

The terms were similar in policy to many previous "surrender and regrant" agreements conducted after 1537 between the Crown and many autonomous Irish chieftains, but unusually, the earl was not obliged to convert to the Church of Ireland.

== Aftermath ==
By the terms of the Treaty of London, the kings of England and Spain committed each side to the cessation of "all hostility and enmity" from April 24, 1603, forward. The terms further provided that neither side would furnish "soldiers, provision, money [sic], arms ammunition or any other kind of assistance to forment [sic] war with the enemies and rebels of the other party". By that, the Irish rebels understood that no more aid could be expected from Spain.

On 2 June 1603, Mountjoy left Ireland in company with Hugh O'Neill and the new lord of Tír Conaill, Rory O'Donnell, to see King James in London.

In 1604, an Act of Oblivion declared that all "offences against the Crown" committed before the King's accession were to be "pardoned, remitted, and utterly extinguished". O'Neill returned to Ulster and appeared to have become a model subject of the Crown. Mountjoy, now a Privy Counsellor remained a champion of the terms of the Treaty and it seems he had become quite taken with his former adversary. The elderly Sir George Carey, who took over as Lord Deputy, made no attempt to clip Tyrone's wings.

That state of affairs was reversed when Sir Arthur Chichester was sworn in as Lord Deputy in February 1605. Lord Deputy Chichester saw Irish Catholicism as a major threat to the crown after the Gunpowder Plot was revealed in October 1605. Though no Irish were involved in the plot, he oversaw a widespread persecution of Catholics, and he ordered the execution of two bishops. He led the campaign by royal officials, acting on the complaints of the "servitors" (tenants) to undermine the authority of Tyrone and Tyrconnell and to erode their economic base. When Hugh O'Neill and other rebel chieftains left Ireland in the Flight of the Earls (1607), interpreted as seeking Spanish help for a new rebellion, Chichester felt entitled to seize their lands under the law of forfeiture. The Plantation of Ulster followed within a decade.

Some of the loyal Gaelic lords were upset with the restoration of lands to the rebel leaders, and that was one factor that drove one of them, Sir Cahir O'Doherty, to launch O'Doherty's Rebellion, which he began with the Burning of Derry in 1608.
