= Bourke (surname) =

- Blazon: Or, a cross gules
- Pronunciation: English: /bərk/ Irish: [ˈbuːɾˠk]
- Language: English / Irish

Origin
- Language: French
- Derivation: de Burgh (de Búrca / Búrc)
- Meaning: "of the borough"
- Region of origin: England, Ireland

Other names
- Variant forms: Burke, Burgo/de Burgo, de Bourgh
- Anglicisation: Burgh

Bourke (Irish: de Búrca; Latin: de Burgo) is an Anglo-Norman Irish surname, a variant of the surname Burke, deriving from the ancient Anglo-Norman and Hiberno-Norman noble dynasty, the House of Burgh. In Ireland, the descendants of William de Burgh (c.1160–1206) had the surname de Burgh which was gaelicised in Irish as de Búrca and over the centuries became Búrc then Burke and Bourke.

Notable people with this name include:

== Surname ==
=== A ===
- Al Bourke or Alan Stamford (born 1928), Australian boxer of the 1940s and 1950s
- Anselm Bourke or Msgr Anselm (Nicholas) Bourke (1835–1924), Irish-Australian Roman Catholic priest
- Arthur Roston Bourke, English association football referee and administrator

=== B ===
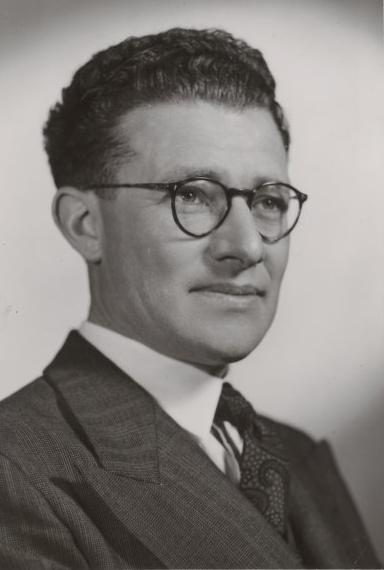
Bill Bourke

- Balthazar Bourke (fl. 1607), Irish soldier and Knight of Santiago
- Barry Bourke (born 1943), Australian rules footballer
- Betty Bourke (née Lucas), (1924–2015), New Zealand politician and health administrator
- Bill Bourke (disambiguation)
  - Bill Bourke (footballer, born 1882) (1882–1932), Australian rules footballer
  - Bill Bourke (politician) or William Meskill Bourke (1913–1981), Australian politician
  - Bill Bourke (footballer, born 1927) (1927–2002), Australian rules footballer
- Brian Bourke (born 1936), Irish artist
- Bruce Bourke (1929–2023), Australian former swimmer

=== C ===
- Cecil Bourke or Cecil Frederick Joseph Bourke (1841–1910), British cleric and Archdeacon of Buckingham
- Charles Bourke (c.1765–1820), Irish priest
- Chris Bourke or Christopher John Bourke, Australian politician
- Chris Bourke (boxer) (born 1994), English professional boxer
- Ciarán Bourke (1935–1988), Irish singer and folk musician
- Colin Bourke (born 1984), Japanese rugby sevens player

=== D ===
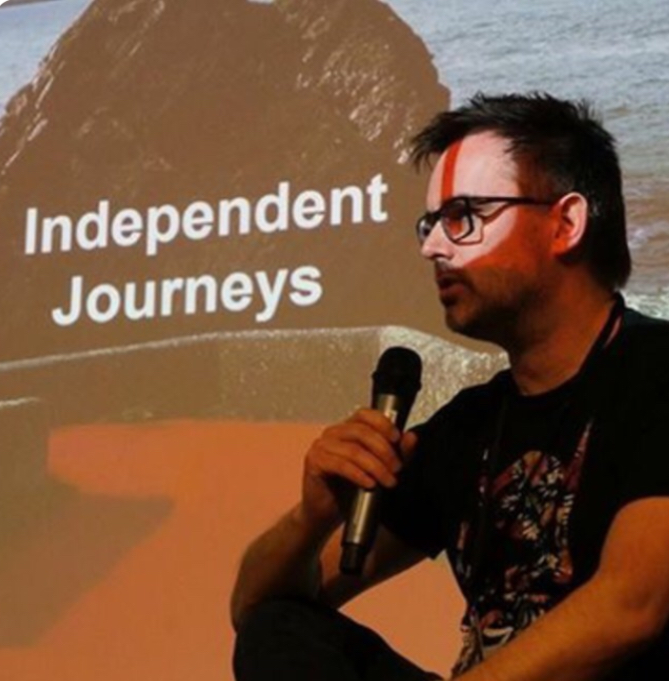
David Noel Bourke

- Damian Bourke (born 1965), Australian rules footballer
- Daniel Bourke (1886–1952), Irish Fianna Fáil politician
- Darren Bourke (born 1970), Australian rules footballer
- Daryl Bourke (born 1965), Australian rules footballer
- David Bourke (born 1976), Australian rules footballer
- David Noel Bourke (born 1970), Denmark-based, Irish-born independent filmmaker
- Dermot Bourke, 7th Earl of Mayo (1851–1927), Anglo-Irish peer

=== E ===
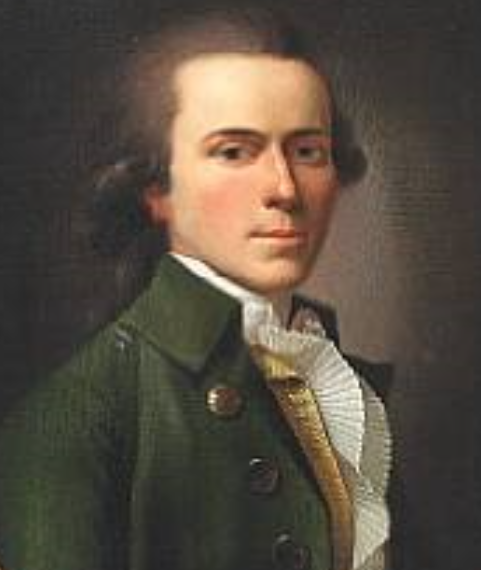
Edmund Bourke

- Eddie Bourke or Edmund Francis Bourke (1852–1926), Irish-South African politician and businessman
- Edmund Bourke (1761–1821) (1761–1821), Danish statesman
- Edwin Bourke (1836–1915), Canadian farmer and political figure in Manitoba
- Eva Bourke (born 1946), German-born Irish poet
- Evelyn Bourke (born 1965), Irish businesswoman

=== F ===
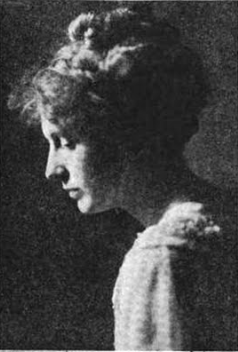
Fannie Bourke

- Fannie Bourke or Fan Bourke or Fannie Burke, (1886–1959), American stage and film actress
- Fergus Bourke (1934–2004), Irish photographer
- Fiona Bourke (born 1988), New Zealand rower
- Francis Bourke or Francis William Bourke (born 1947), Australian rules footballer
- Frank Bourke or Francis Michael "Frank" Bourke (1922–2011), Australian rules footballer

=== G ===
- Gillian Bourke (born 1984), Irish female rugby union player
- Glenn Bourke (born 1960), Australian sailor
- Greg Bourke, Australian professional rugby league footballer

=== H ===
- Henry Bourke or Brigadier Henry Sackville Joynt Bourke (1900–1983), British Army officer
- Harry Legge-Bourke or Sir Henry Legge-Bourke (1914–1973) British politician

=== J ===
John Gregory Bourke

- Joanna Bourke (born 1963), British-based historian
- Joe Bourke (1884–1932), Australian rules footballer
- John Bourke (disambiguation)
  - John Bourke (Australian politician) (1901–1970), Australian politician
  - John Bourke (Scottish footballer) (born 1953), Scottish footballer
  - John Bourke, 1st Earl of Mayo (c. 1705–1790), Irish politician and peer
  - John Bourke, 2nd Earl of Mayo (c. 1729–1792), Irish politician and peer
  - John Bourke, 4th Earl of Mayo (1766–1849), Irish politician and peer
  - John Gregory Bourke (1846–1896), American Civil War medal of honor recipient
  - John Philip Bourke (1860–1914), Australian poet
  - Sir John Bourke of Brittas, Irish Roman Catholic, hanged for refusing to renounce his faith
- Jordon Bourke (born 1994), Australian rules footballer
- Joseph Bourke (1772–1843), Irish Anglican priest
- Joseph Bourke, 3rd Earl of Mayo or Joseph Deane Bourke (1736–1794), Irish peer and cleric

=== K ===
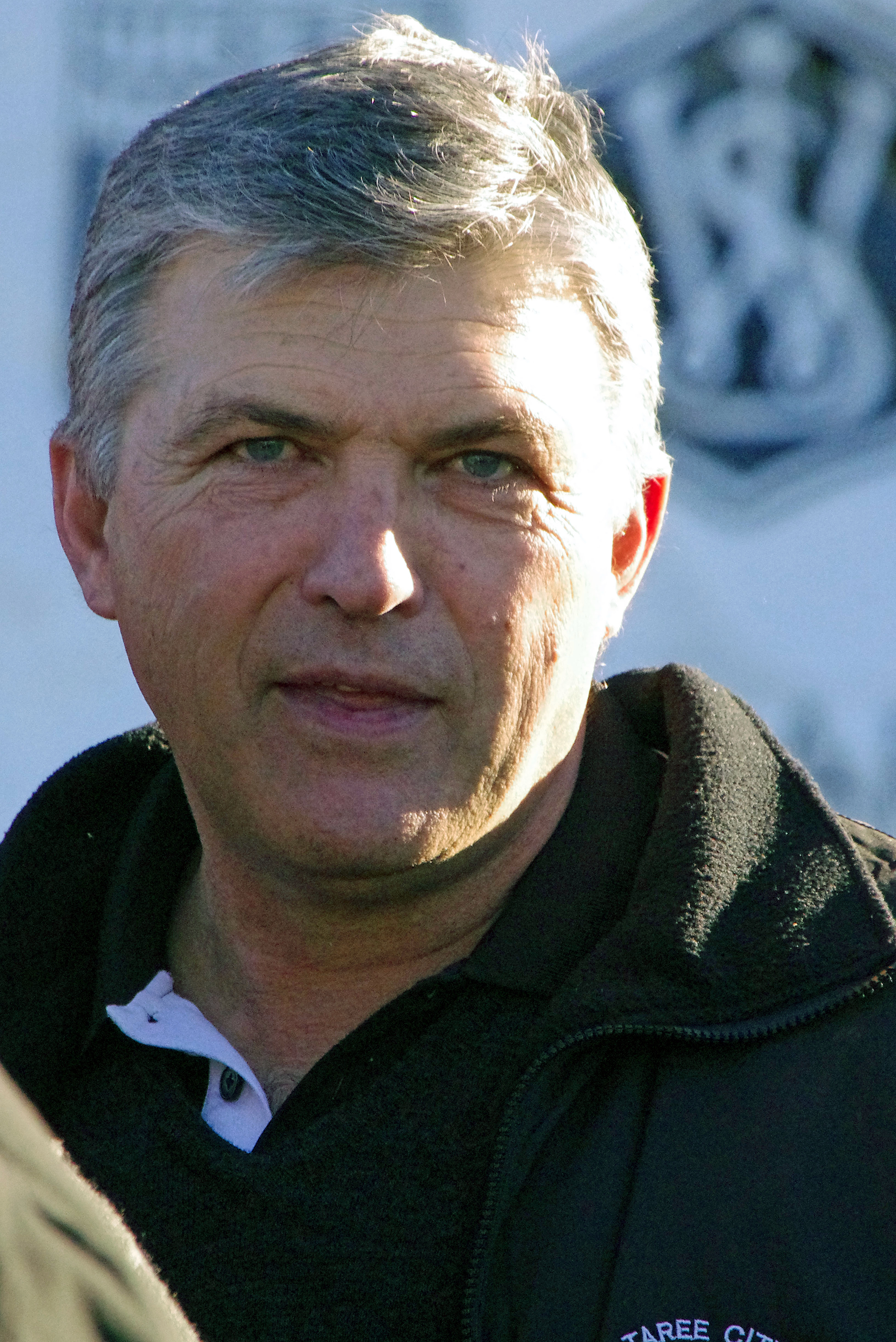
Ken Bourke

- Katherine Bourke, Australian lawyer and judge
- Ken Bourke (born 1958), Australian professional rugby league footballer

=== L ===
- Latika Bourke (born 1984), Australian author and journalist
- Lindsay Bourke or Lindsay Blue (born 1945), Australian classical and ambient musician, visual artist and poet

=== M ===
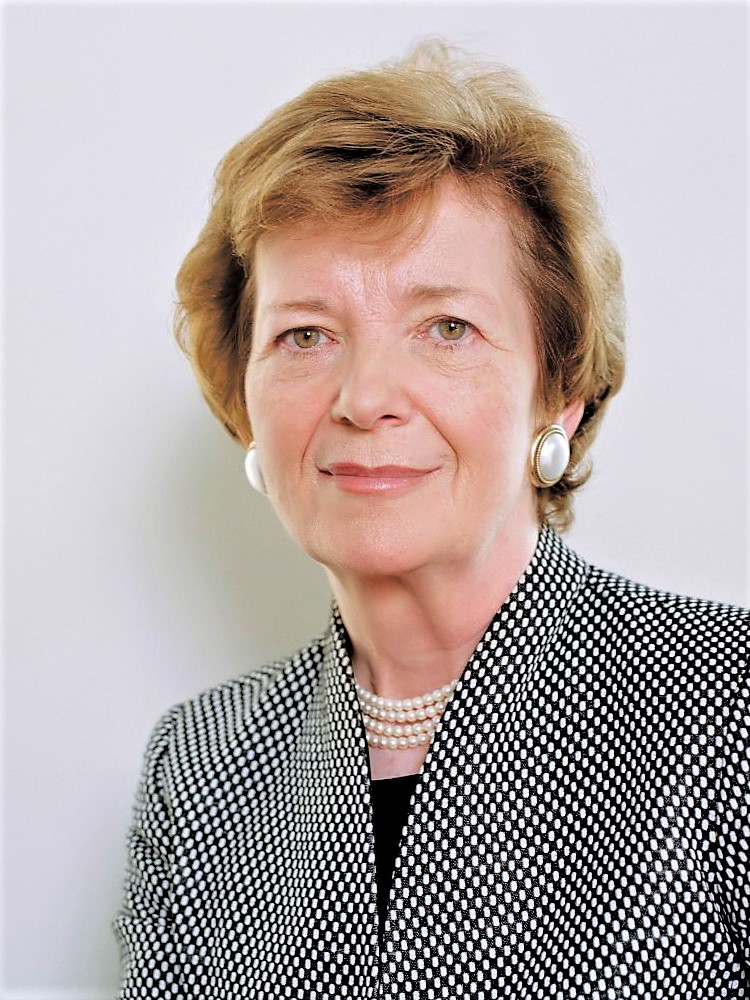
Mary Bourke Robinson

- Margaret Bourke (1945–2021), Australian bridge player
- Margaret Bourke-White (1904–1971), American photographer
- Martin Bourke (disambiguation)
  - Martin Bourke (diplomat), (born 1947), British diplomat, governor of the Turks and Caicos Islands
  - Martin Bourke (footballer), (born 1936), Australian rules footballer
  - Martin Bourke (politician), (1867–1939), American lawyer and politician from New York
- Mary Bourke-Dowling (1882–1944), Irish suffragette and republican
- Mary Robinson (née Bourke; born 1944), Irish politician and 7th President of Ireland
- Matthew Bourke (born 1968), Australian rules footballer
- Maurice Bourke (1853–1900), British Royal Navy officer
- Meiler Bourke or Miles Bourke, 11th Mac William Iochtar (died 1520), Irish chieftain and noble
- Michael Bourke (born 1941) British cleric and Bishop of Wolverhampton
- Miles Bourke (1925–1982), Australian farmer

=== N ===
- Nicholas Bourke (died 1771), Anglo-Irish planter in Jamaica
- Norah Lindsay or Norah Mary Madeleine Bourke (1873–1948), Anglo-Irish socialite and garden designer

=== P ===
- Paddy Bourke (disambiguation)
  - Paddy Bourke (footballer) (1883–1930), Australian rules footballer
  - Paddy Bourke (politician), Irish politician
- Paget Bourke or Sir Paget John Bourke (1906–1983), British colonial judge
- Pat Bourke (disambiguation)
  - Pat Bourke (footballer, born 1894) (1894–1982), Australian footballer for Melbourne
  - Pat Bourke (footballer, born 1923) (1923–2005), Australian footballer for South Melbourne
  - Pat Bourke (musician), guitarist with the band Dallas Crane
- Peter Bourke (runner) (born 1958), Australian former middle-distance runner
- Pieter Bourke Australian musician, composer, producer and audio engineer

=== R ===
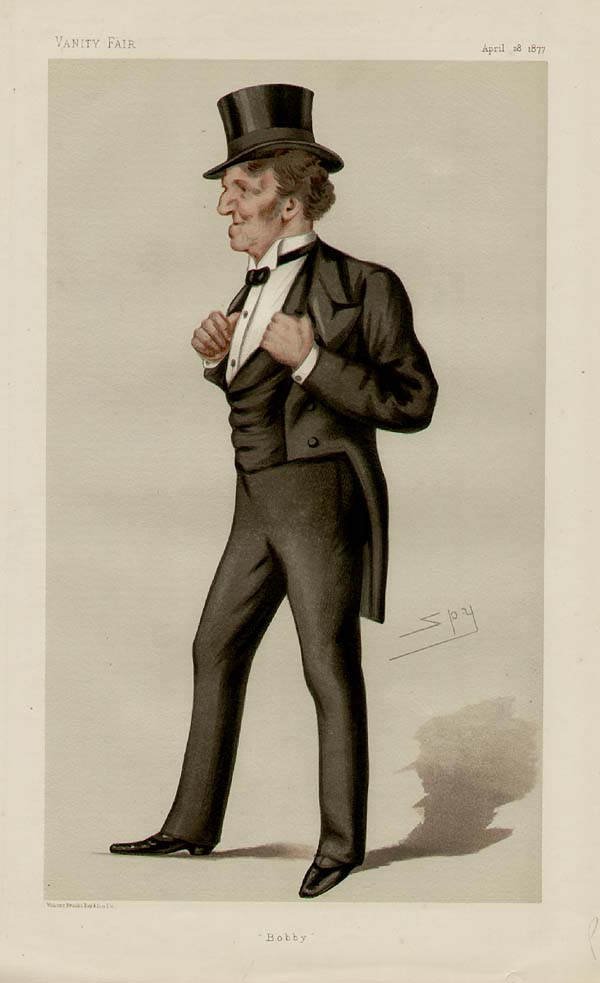
Robert Bourke, 1st Baron Connemara

- Richard Bourke (disambiguation)
  - Ricard Bourke, 9th Mac William Iochtar (died 1509), Irish chieftain and noble
  - Ricard Ó Cuairsge Bourke, 7th Mac William Iochtar (died1473), Irish chieftain and noble
  - Ricard mac Seaán an Tearmainn Bourke, 16th Mac William Iochtar (died 1571), Irish chieftain and noble
  - Richard Bourke, 6th Earl of Mayo or Richard Southwell Bourke (1822–1872), Irish statesman
  - Richard Bourke (academic) (born 1965), Irish academic
  - Richard Bourke (bishop) (1767–1832), Irish bishop
  - Richard the Iron Bourke, 18th Mac William Iochtar (died 1583), Irish chieftain and noble
  - Richard Bourke (d. 1586), 19th Mac William Iochtar (died 1586), Irish chieftain and noble
  - Richard "the Devils Hook" Bourke, 22nd Mac William Iochtar (died 1601), Irish chieftain and noble
  - Richard Bourke or Sir Richard Bourke (1777–1855), 8th Governor of New South Wales
  - Rick Bourke or Richard Bourke (1953–2006), Australian rugby league footballer
- Robert Bourke, 1st Baron Connemara (1827–1902), British Conservative politician and colonial administrator
- Roger Bourke White (1911–2002), American businessman
- Russell Bourke, Australian engineer

=== S ===
- Sean Bourke or Sean Aloyisious Bourke (1934–1982) Irish prisoner
- Seaán mac Oliver Bourke or Seaán mac Oliver (John) Bourke, 17th Mac William Íochtar and 1st Baron Ardenerie (died 1580), Irish noble
- Shân Legge-Bourke (born 1943), Welsh landowner
- Shane Bourke (born 1988) is an Irish sportsperson
- Stan Bourke, Australian professional soccer player
- Stephen Bourke, Australian archaeologist

=== T ===
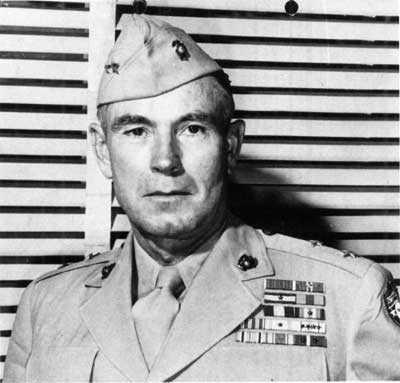
Thomas E. Bourke

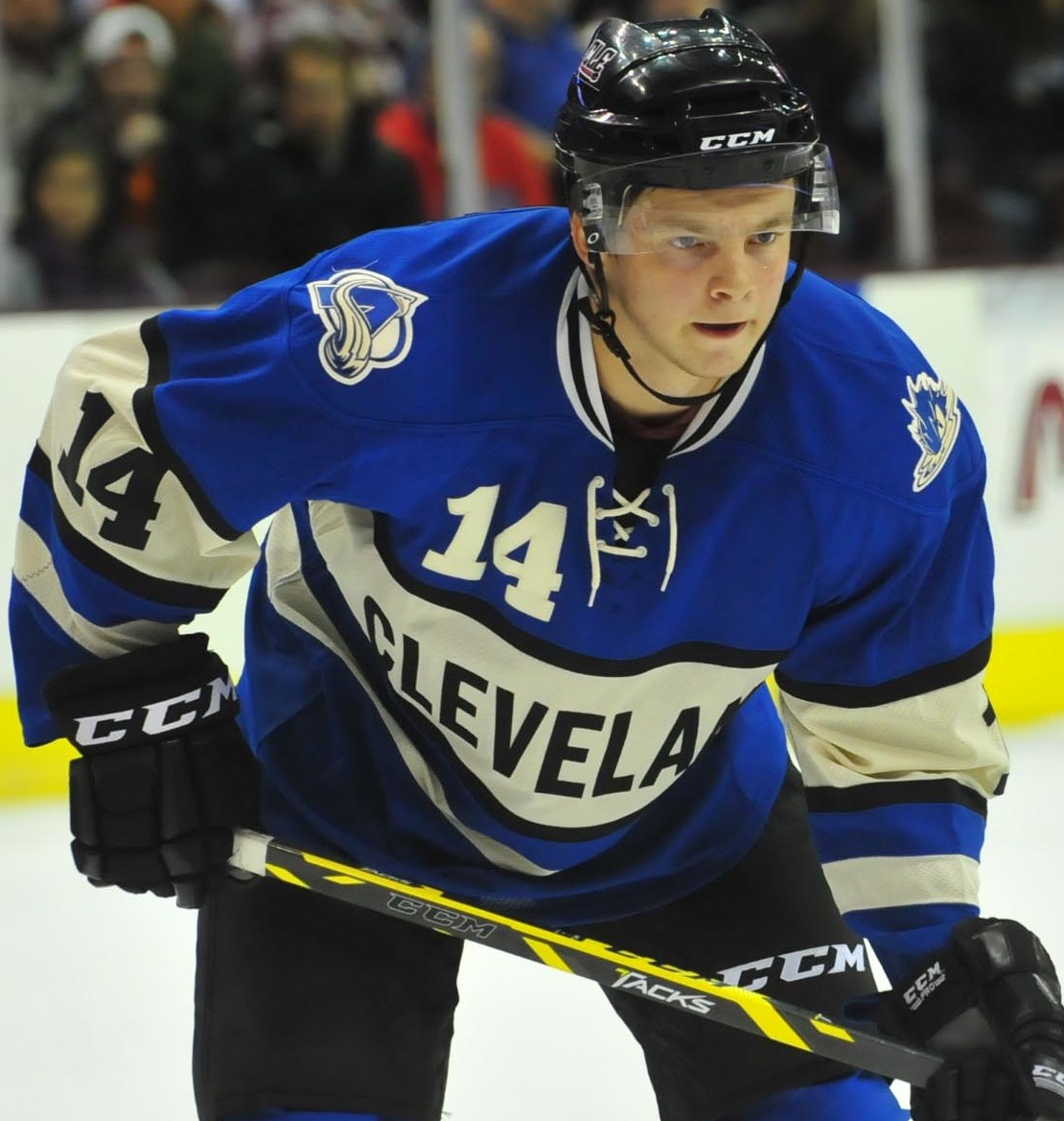
Troy Bourke

- Ted Bourke or Edward Arthur Bourke (1904–1952), Australian rules footballer
- Ted Bourke (footballer, born 1925) or Edward Thomas Bourke (1925–2014), Australian rules footballer
- Terence Bourke, 10th Earl of Mayo or Terence Patrick Bourke (1929–2006), Anglo-Irish peer
- Theobald Bourke (disambiguation)
  - Theobald Bourke, 8th Mac William Iochtar (died 1503), Irish chieftain and noble
  - Theobald mac Uilleag Bourke, 14th Mac William Iochtar (died 1537), Irish chieftain and noble
  - Theobald Bourke (Irish MP) (c.1683–1726), Irish politician and MP
- Thomas Bourke (disambiguation)
  - Thomas Bourke (cricketer) or Thomas Joseph Deane Bourke (1815–1875), Irish cricketer
  - Thomas E. Bourke or Thomas Eugene Bourke (1896–1978), United States Marine Corps general
  - Thomas Bourke, 4th Baron Bourke of Connell, 4th Baron Bourke of Connell (d. 1599), Irish noble
  - Tom Bourke (1918–2001), Australian rugby league footballer
- Tibbot MacWalter Kittagh Bourke or Theobald FitzWalter Kittagh Bourke, 21st Mac William Iochtar (c.1570–c.1602), Irish chieftain and noble
- Tibbot ne Long Bourke, 1st Viscount Mayo or Theobald Bourke, 1st Viscount Mayo (1567–1629), Irish peer and parliamentarian
- Tiggy Legge-Bourke (born 1965), former British royal nanny
- Tim Bourke (footballer) (born 1969), Australian rules footballer
- Tim Bourke, Australian bridge player and author
- Tony Bourke (Australian politician) or Anthony James Bourke (born 1941), Australian politician
- Tony Bourke (footballer) (born 1976), Australian rules footballer
- Troy Bourke (born 1994), Canadian professional ice hockey player

=== V ===
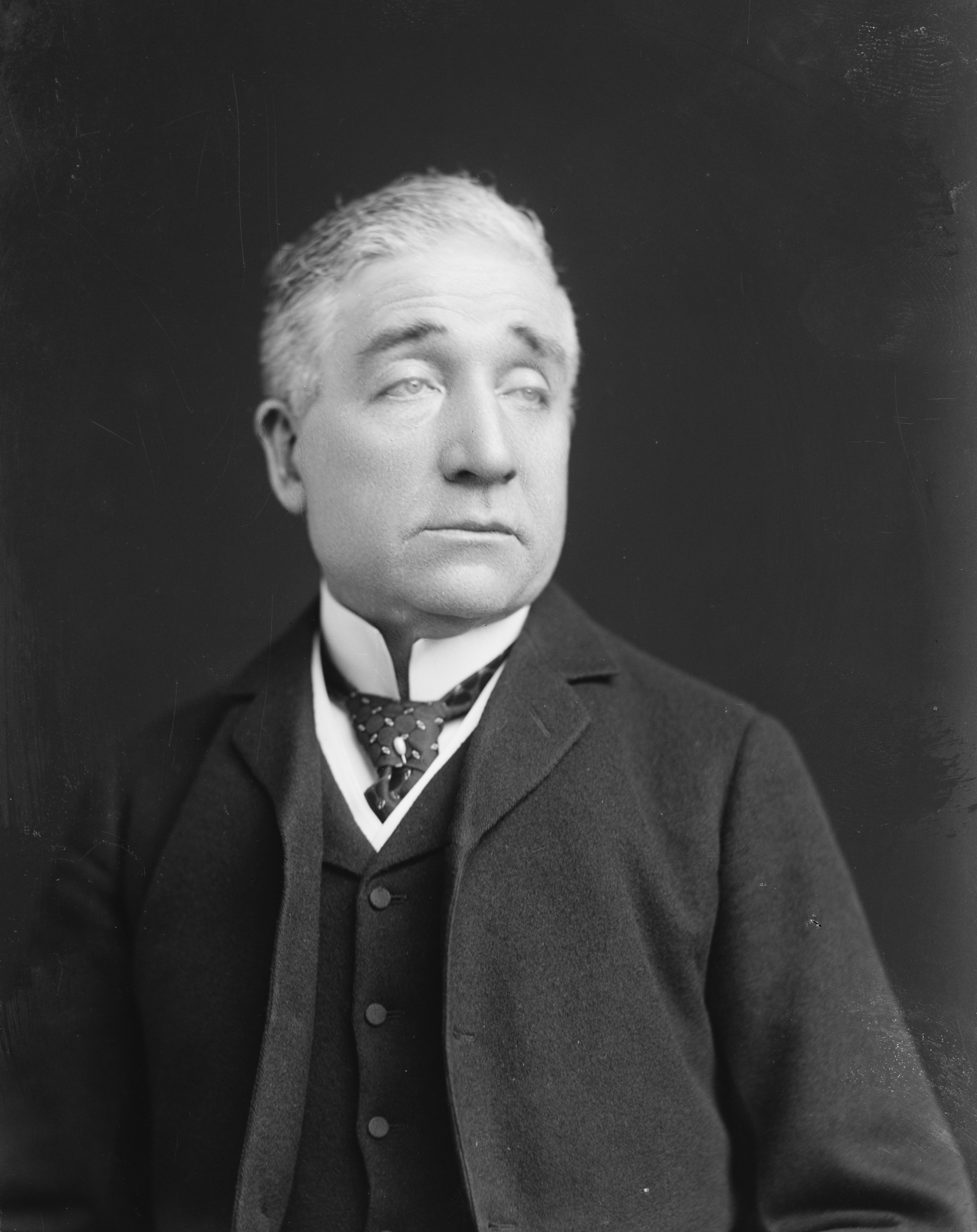
William Bourke Cockran

- Vernon Bourke (1907–1998), Canadian-American Philosopher
- Vin Bourke or Vincent Valera Bourke (born 1933), Australian rules footballer

=== W ===
- William Bourke (disambiguation)
  - William "the Blind Abbot" Bourke, 20th Mac William Iochtar (died 1593), Irish chieftain and noble
  - William Bourke, 1st Baron Bourke of Connell, 1st Baron Bourke of Connell (died 1584), Irish noble
  - William Bourke Cockran (Bourke Cockran or Burke Cochran), (1854–1923), Irish-American politician and orator

== Given name ==
- Aylmer Bourke Lambert (1761–1842), British botanist and one of the first fellows of the Linnean Society
- Bourke B. Hickenlooper or Bourke Blakemore Hickenlooper (1896–1971), American attorney and politician
- Philip Bourke Marston (1850–1887), English poet

== See also ==
- Bourke (disambiguation)
- House of Burgh, an Anglo-Norman and Hiberno-Norman dynasty founded in 1193
- Earl of Mayo, earldom created in the Peerage of Ireland in 1785
- Baron Bourke of Castleconnell, barony created in the Peerage of Ireland in 1580
- Baron Bourke of Brittas, barony created in the Peerage of Ireland in 1618
- Baron Ardenerie, barony created in the Peerage of Ireland in 1580
- Viscount Bourke of Clanmorries, viscountcy created in the Peerage of Ireland in 1629
- Baron Connemara, barony created in the Peerage of the United Kingdom in 1887
- de Burgh, surname
- Burke, surname
