= William Bourke =

William or Bill Bourke may refer to:

- William Bourke, 8th Baron Bourke of Connell (died c. 1691), Irish Jacobite peer
- William "the Blind Abbot" Bourke (died 1593), Irish chieftain and noble
- Bill Bourke (politician) (1913–1981), Australian politician
- Bill Bourke (footballer, born 1882) (1882–1932), Australian rules footballer
- Bill Bourke (footballer, born 1927) (1927–2002), Australian rules footballer
