= Thomas Bourke =

Thomas Bourke may refer to:

- Thomas Bourke (cricketer) (1815–1875), Irish cricketer
- Thomas E. Bourke (1896–1978), United States Marine Corps general
- Thomas Francis Bourke, Irish soldier who fought in the American Civil War
- Thomas Bourke, 4th Baron Bourke of Connell (died 1599), Irish noble
- Tom Bourke (1918–2001), Australian rugby league footballer
