= Mark Eisner =

American politician

Mark Eisner (December 15, 1885 – March 28, 1953) was a Jewish-American lawyer, tax expert, and politician from New York.

== Early life ==
Eisner was born on December 15, 1885, in New York City, New York, the son of David L. Eisner and Sophia Silverman.

Eisner attended New York City public schools and graduated from the College of the City of New York with a B.A. cum laude in 1905. He then taught in public schools while attending New York University School of Law, graduating from there in 1907. He was admitted to the bar that year and began practicing law. He was active in politics since he was young, serving as a campaign orator before he was old enough to vote.

== Political career ==
In 1912, he was elected to the New York State Assembly as a Democrat with the support of the Independence League and the Citizens Union, representing the New York County 17th District. He served in the Assembly in 1913 (when he introduced the statewide Direct Primary Bill and, speaking out against the impeachment of Governor William Sulzer, became the only Manhattan Democrat who voted against Sulzer's impeachment) and 1914 (when he received the nomination of both the Democratic and Progressive Parties).

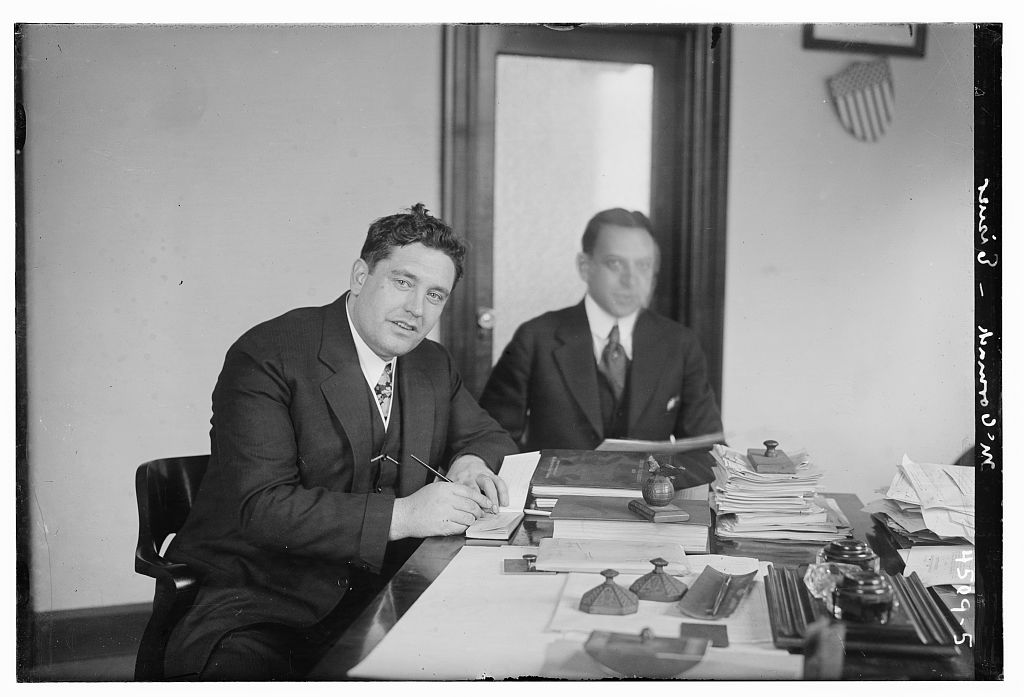
Mark Eisner, right and in the back, collecting a $75,000 check on behalf the Internal Revenue Service from the singer John McCormack in 1918.

Eisner was a delegate to the 1915 New York State Constitutional Convention. He was a U.S. Internal Revenue Collector from 1915 to 1919 and a lecturer on taxation for the New York School of Finance from 1919 to 1922. He became a member of the law firm Olvany, Eisner & Donnelly in 1924. He was chairman of the judges and lawyer division of the Federation of Jewish Philanthropic Societies from 1924 to 1930. He served as counsel to the National Recovery Administration in New York City in 1933 and as professor of taxation law in New York Law School in 1935. His law office was at 20 Exchange Place. Mayor James J. Walker appointed him a member of the New York City Board of Higher Education when it was established in 1926, and he served as its chairman from 1932 to 1938. He was also president of the American Association for Jewish Education from 1939 to 1947. He wrote Lay View of Some of the Problems of Higher Education in 1936 and edited How Government Regulates Business in 1939.

== Later life and death ==
Eisner was treasurer and director of the New York Adult Education Council, Inc., a trustee of the Practising Law Institute and Montefiore Hospital, treasurer of the College Art Association, an executive committee member of the Tax Institute and its president from 1943 to 1945, president of the Alumni Association of the College of the City of New York from 1943 to 1945, and a member of the New York City Bar Association, the New York County Lawyers' Association, the New York State Bar Association, the American Bar Association, Delta Sigma Phi, Phi Beta Kappa, the Freemasons, the Elks, the Knights of Pythias, the Salmagundi Club, the Harmonie Club, the City Club of New York, and the Quaker Ridge Golf Club. He married Helene Oettinger in 1922. Their children were Barbara and Mark.

Eisner died in Tucson, Arizona, while on a trip there on March 28, 1953.

New York State Assembly
| Preceded by Franklin Brooks | New York State Assembly; New York County, 17th District; 1913–1914 | Succeeded by Martin Bourke |
