= Pat Bourke =

Pat Bourke may refer to:

- Pat Bourke (footballer, born 1894) (1894–1982), Australian footballer for Melbourne
- Pat Bourke (footballer, born 1923) (1923–2005), Australian footballer for South Melbourne
- Pat Bourke (musician), guitarist with the band Dallas Crane

== See also ==
- Paddy Bourke (disambiguation)
- Pat Burke (born 1973), Irish basketball player
- Patrick Burke (disambiguation)
