= Richard Bourke (disambiguation) =

Richard Bourke (1777–1855) was an Irish-born British Army officer.

The name may also refer to:

- Ricard Bourke, 9th Mac William Iochtar (died 1509), Irish chieftain and noble
- Ricard Ó Cuairsge Bourke, 7th Mac William Iochtar (died 1473), Irish chieftain and noble
- Ricard mac Seaán an Tearmainn Bourke, 16th Mac William Iochtar (died 1571), Irish chieftain and noble
- Richard Southwell Bourke, 6th Earl of Mayo (1822–1872), Irish statesman
- Richard Bourke (born 1965), Irish academic
- Richard Bourke (1767–1832), Irish bishop
- Richard Brooks (captain) (1765–1833) English settler in colonial New South Wales
- Richard the Iron Bourke, 18th Mac William Iochtar (died 1583), Irish chieftain and noble
- Richard Bourke, 19th Mac William Iochtar (died 1586), Irish chieftain and noble
- Richard "the Devils Hook" Bourke, 22nd Mac William Iochtar (died 1601), Irish chieftain and noble
- Rick Bourke (1953–2006), Australian rugby league footballer
