= Balthazar Bourke =

Balthazar Bourke was an Irish soldier and Knight of Santiago, fl. 1607.

Balthazar Bourke was the son and heir of the Mac William Bourke of County Mayo. In 1607, he was made a knight of Santiago. Baptized Walter, his name was adapted to overcome pronunciation difficulties for the Spanish.
