= Theobald Bourke, 3rd Baron Bourke of Brittas =

Irish peer (died after 1691)

Theobald Bourke, 3rd Baron Bourke of Brittas (fl. 1668–1691, died by 9 September 1706) was an Irish peer and Jacobite soldier.

== Biography ==
Bourke was the son of William Bourke and Elizabeth FitzPatrick, and the nephew of Theobald Bourke, 1st Baron Bourke of Brittas. In 1668 he succeeded his cousin, John, as Baron Bourke of Brittas. After the Glorious Revolution of 1688, Bourke remained loyal to James II and he was summoned to attend the short-lived Patriot Parliament held by the king in Dublin in 1689.

During the subsequent War of the Two Kings, Bourke raised a regiment of horse to serve in the Jacobite army and was a captain in Hugh Sutherland's Horse. He served throughout the conflict, and was present at the Siege of Limerick in 1691 when his troop successfully evaded capture during a Williamite ambush by Richard Leveson. After the defeat of the Jacobite forces, Bourke joined in the Flight of the Wild Geese to France; he never returned to Ireland and died in Italy. Bourke was attainted in 1691 and consequently forfeited his titles and estates, although his heirs continued to use the title Lord Brittas for several generations.

He married Lady Honora O'Brien (died 1718), daughter of Murrough O'Brien, 1st Earl of Inchiquin and Elizabeth St Leger. The couple had at least three children.

Peerage of Ireland
Preceded by John Bourke	Baron Bourke of Brittas; 1668–1691	Forfeited
