= Evelyn Bourke =

Irish businesswoman and Group CEO of Bupa

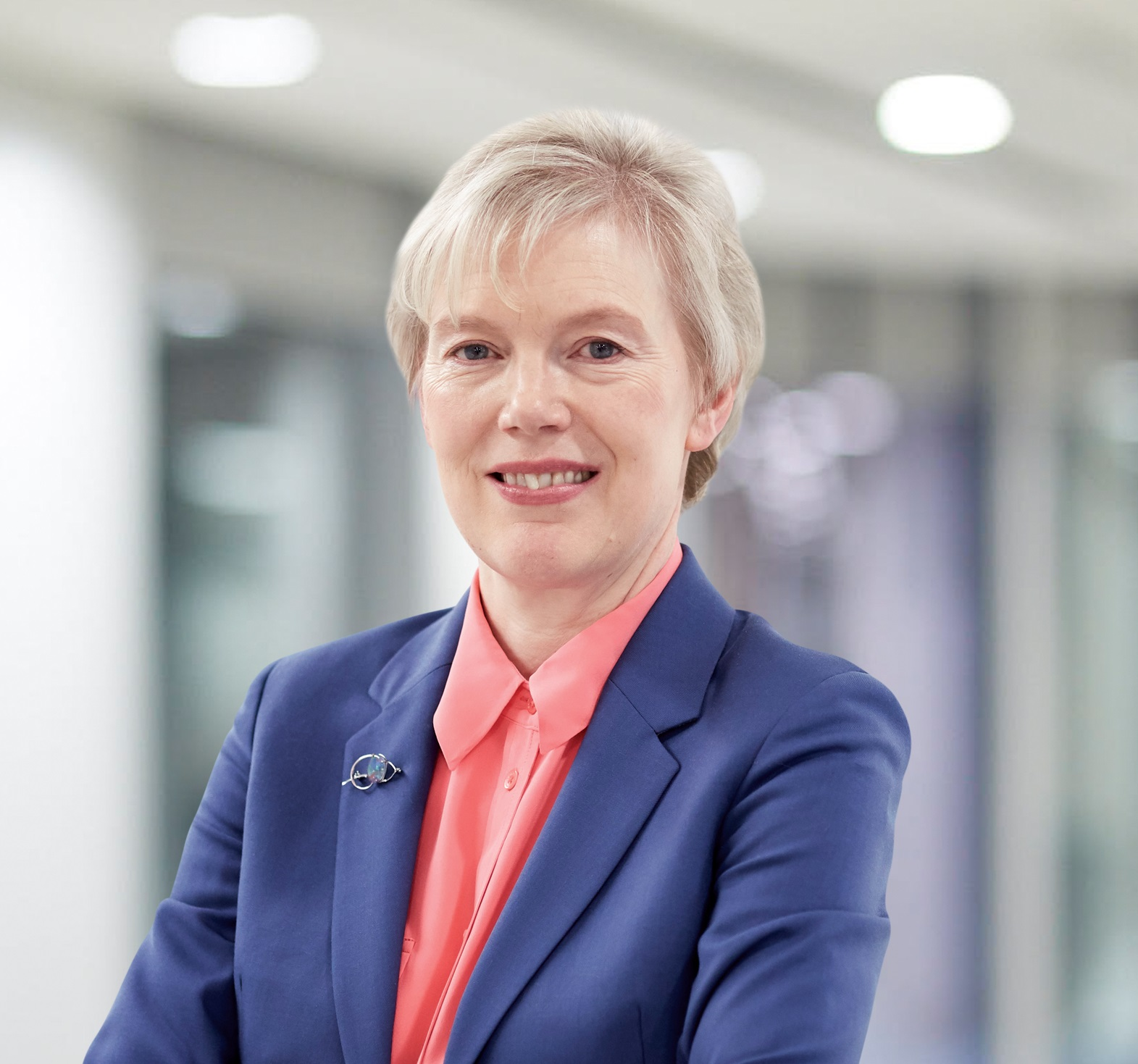
- Born: 1965 (age 60–61); Drom, County Tipperary, Ireland
- Education: London Business School
- Occupation: Businesswoman

Evelyn Brigid Bourke (born 1965) is an Irish businesswoman. She is a non-executive board member of Marks and Spencer (Appointed February 2021), Admiral Group (appointed April 2021), AJ Bell ( appointed July 2021) and chair of GenesisCare UK (appointed July 2024) Her most recent executive role was as group CEO at Bupa from July 2016 to December 2020.

She grew up in County Tipperary, Ireland. She was one of the first two women in Ireland to qualify (jointly) as an actuary and holds an MBA from the London Business School.

In addition to her executive career, Bourke has served on the boards of numerous public and private companies, including as a non-executive director of Marks and Spencer plc (appointed February 2021), Admiral Group plc (appointed April 2021), and AJ Bell plc (appointed July 2021), and as chair of GenesisCare UK (appointed July 2024).
