= Martin Bourke =

Martin Bourke may refer to:

- Martin Bourke (diplomat) (born 1947), British diplomat, governor of the Turks and Caicos Islands
- Martin Bourke (footballer) (born 1936), Australian rules footballer
- Martin Bourke (politician) (1867–1939), American lawyer and politician from New York
