= Treaty of Kiel =

1814 treaty between the UK, Sweden, and Denmark–Norway

Kieltraktaten (Danish) Freden i Kiel (Swedish)
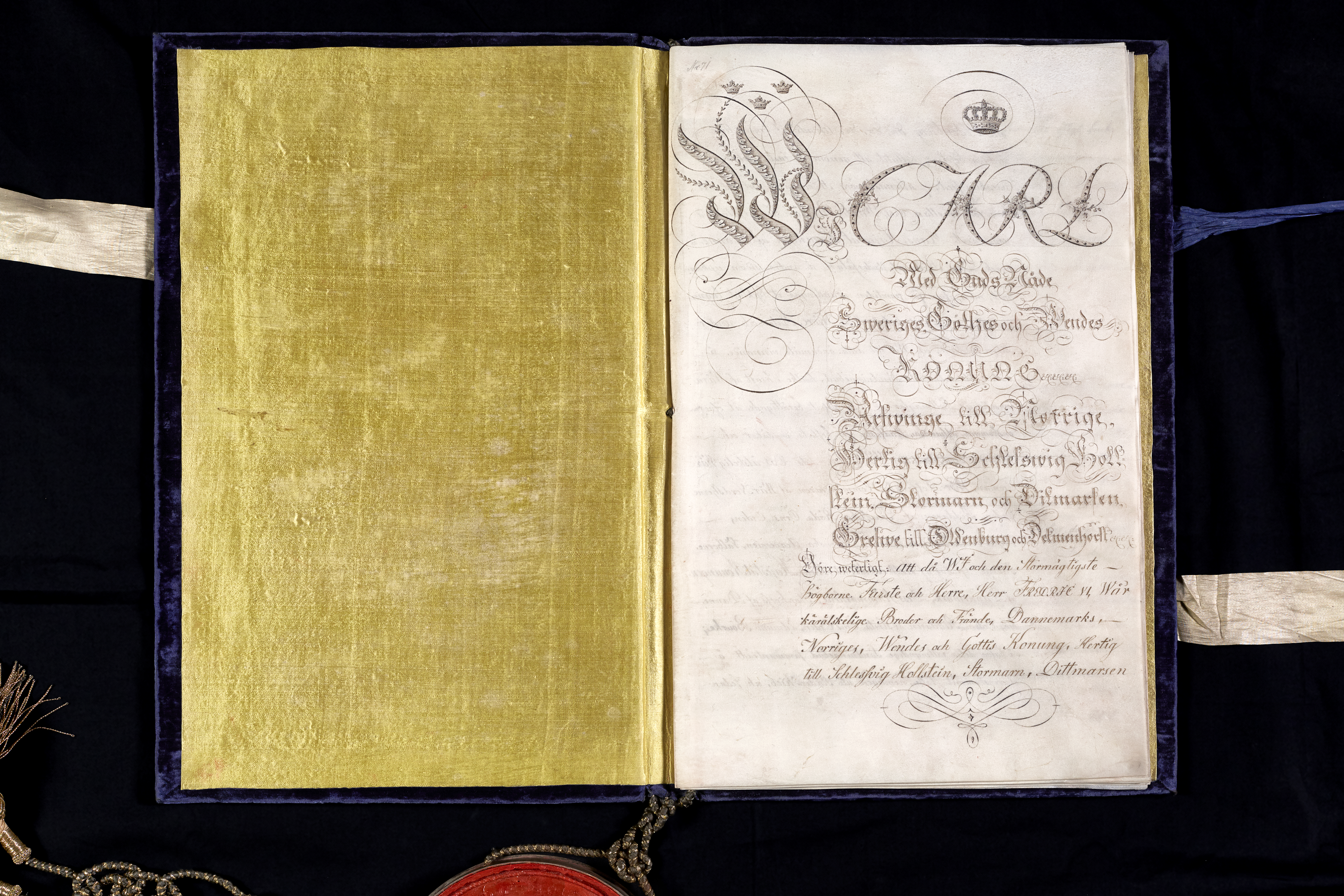
- Translated reprint of the part of the treaty concerned with Norway
- Type: Peace treaty
- Context: War of the Sixth Coalition during the Napoleonic Wars
- Signed: 14 January 1814
- Location: Kiel, Duchy of Holstein
- Parties: United Kingdom of Great Britain and Ireland; Denmark–Norway; Kingdom of Sweden
- Language: French

The Treaty of Kiel (Danish: Kieltraktaten) or Peace of Kiel (Swedish and Norwegian: Kielfreden or freden i Kiel) was concluded between the United Kingdom of Great Britain and Ireland and the Kingdom of Sweden on one side and the Kingdoms of Denmark and Norway on the other side on 14 January 1814 in Kiel. It ended the hostilities between the parties in the ongoing Napoleonic Wars, where the United Kingdom and Sweden were part of the anti-French alliance (the Sixth Coalition) while Denmark–Norway was allied to the French Empire.

Frederick VI of Denmark joined the anti-French alliance, ceded Heligoland to Britain, and further ceded the Kingdom of Norway to Sweden in return for Swedish Pomerania. Specifically excluded from the exchange were the Norwegian dependencies of Greenland, Iceland and the Faroe Islands, which remained in the union with Denmark after being transferred. The actual time of cession of the islands is somewhat disputed. Some claim it took place with the Union of Denmark and Norway in 1536/37, as the possessions of the Norwegian crown were claimed by the Oldenburg king. Nevertheless, they were still referred to as "dependencies of Norway" in later official documents. Also the Treaty of Kiel states: "...and provinces, constituting the kingdom of Norway, [..], together with their dependencies (Greenland, the Faroe Isles, and Iceland, excepted); [...] shall belong in full and sovereign property to the King of Sweden,...", clearly indicating that they were until 1814 regarded as a part of Norway. Norway would unsuccessfully contest the Danish claim to all of Greenland in the Eastern Greenland Case of 1931–1933.

However, not all provisions of the treaty would come into force. Norway declared its independence, adopted a constitution and elected Crown Prince Christian Frederik as its own king. Sweden therefore refused to hand over Swedish Pomerania, which instead passed to Prussia after the Congress of Vienna in 1815. After a short war with Sweden, Norway accepted entering into a personal union with Sweden at the Convention of Moss. King Christian abdicated after convening an extraordinary Storting, which revised the Constitution to allow for the Union. It was formally established when the Storting elected Charles XIII as king of Norway on 4 November 1814.

== Background ==
In the beginning of the Napoleonic Wars, Denmark–Norway and the Kingdom of Sweden tried to maintain neutrality but soon became involved in the fighting, joining opposite camps. Swedish king Gustav IV Adolf entered an alliance with the United Kingdom of Great Britain and Ireland and the Russian Empire against Napoleon Bonaparte in 1805, and declared war on Napoleonic France. The United Kingdom, which had declared war on France in 1803, paid subsidies to Sweden. Before Gustav IV Adolf marched his forces out of Swedish Pomerania, a province long coveted by Prussia, he negotiated an agreement that Prussia would not attack it. Denmark remained neutral.

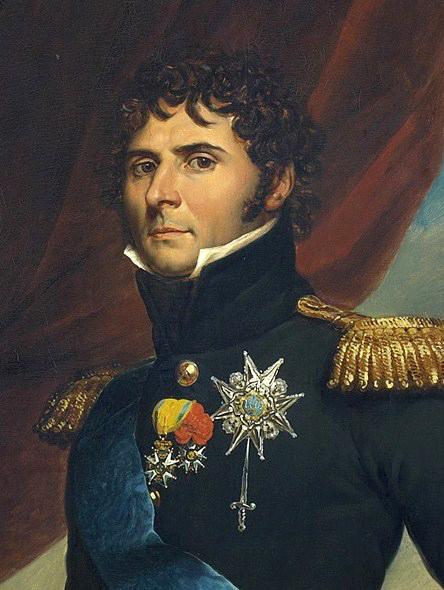
Jean Baptiste Bernadotte, Marshal of France, and later King Charles XIV John of Sweden

In July, 1807, after the decisive victory by Napoleonic forces over the armies of Russia, the two states signed one of the Treaties of Tilsit, wherein Russia was obligated to attack enemies of Napoleonic France. Thereafter, concerned that the considerable navy of Denmark-Norway could fall under control of the French, a British fleet was dispatched that bombarded Copenhagen and seized or destroyed the Dano-Norwegian ships. This precipitated the Anglo-Russian War (1807-1812) and an alignment between Denmark-Norway and France, where the Danes joined the Continental System and engaged in the Gunboat War against the British. Meanwhile, Napoleonic forces seized Swedish Pomerania and the Russian Tsar pressed Sweden to cut off trade with Britain. When Gustav IV Adolf refused to break his alliance with the United Kingdom, the Russian Tsar invaded Finland in 1808 and severed it from Sweden in the Finnish War. Sweden could no longer uphold her anti-French foreign policy, and declared the bloodless Anglo-Swedish war of 1810–1812. In an unexpected and idiosyncratic turn of events, French Marshal Jean Baptiste Bernadotte was elected heir to the Swedish throne in 1810. However, the new Crown Prince emphasized the preservation of Swedish independence of action, and Franco-Swedish relations soured, particularly after another French invasion of Swedish Pomerania and the island of Rügen in January 1812.

By late 1812, Napoleon's forces had been decimated in their failed attempt to subdue Russia, and started their westward retreat. Sweden allied with Russia on 30 August 1812, with the United Kingdom on 3 March 1813, and with Prussia on 22 April 1813 as the Sixth Coalition began to take shape. Previously, on 23 March 1813, Sweden had declared war on Napoleon. Bernadotte's condition for entering the anti-Napoleonic alliance was the gain of Norway, which the United Kingdom and Russia accepted in May 1813. Prussia however did not acknowledge this claim at first. Thus, Bernadotte hesitated to enter the war with full force, and only engaged in a campaign against Hamburg which on 30 June was re-conquered by allied French and Danish forces. When Prussia finally accepted the Swedish claim to Norway on 22 July, Sweden joined the alliance of Reichenbach concluded between Russia, the United Kingdom and Prussia on 14/15 June. With three armies (North, Main and Silesian, the Northern army under Bernadotte's command), the allies subsequently cleared Northern Germany of French forces. Denmark, who had maintained the alliance with Napoleon because of the Swedish claim to Norway, was isolated and, as a consequence of the war, bankrupt. Bernadotte, now free to attack Denmark after Napoleon's defeat at Leipzig in Mid-October, took his combined Swedish/Russian Army and quickly defeated the outnumbered Royal Danish Army and occupied Holstein and Schleswig during late December 1813. Frederick VI agreed to make peace once it was clear that Bernadotte would occupy Jutland and Zealand (with British naval assistance), if necessary to force the Norwegian cession.

== Dano-British treaty ==
The treaty between the Kingdom of Denmark and the United Kingdom of Great Britain and Ireland was negotiated by Danish diplomat Edmund Bourke and the British envoy at the Swedish court, Edward Thornton. It consisted of 14 articles, to which two articles were added in Brussels on 7 April.

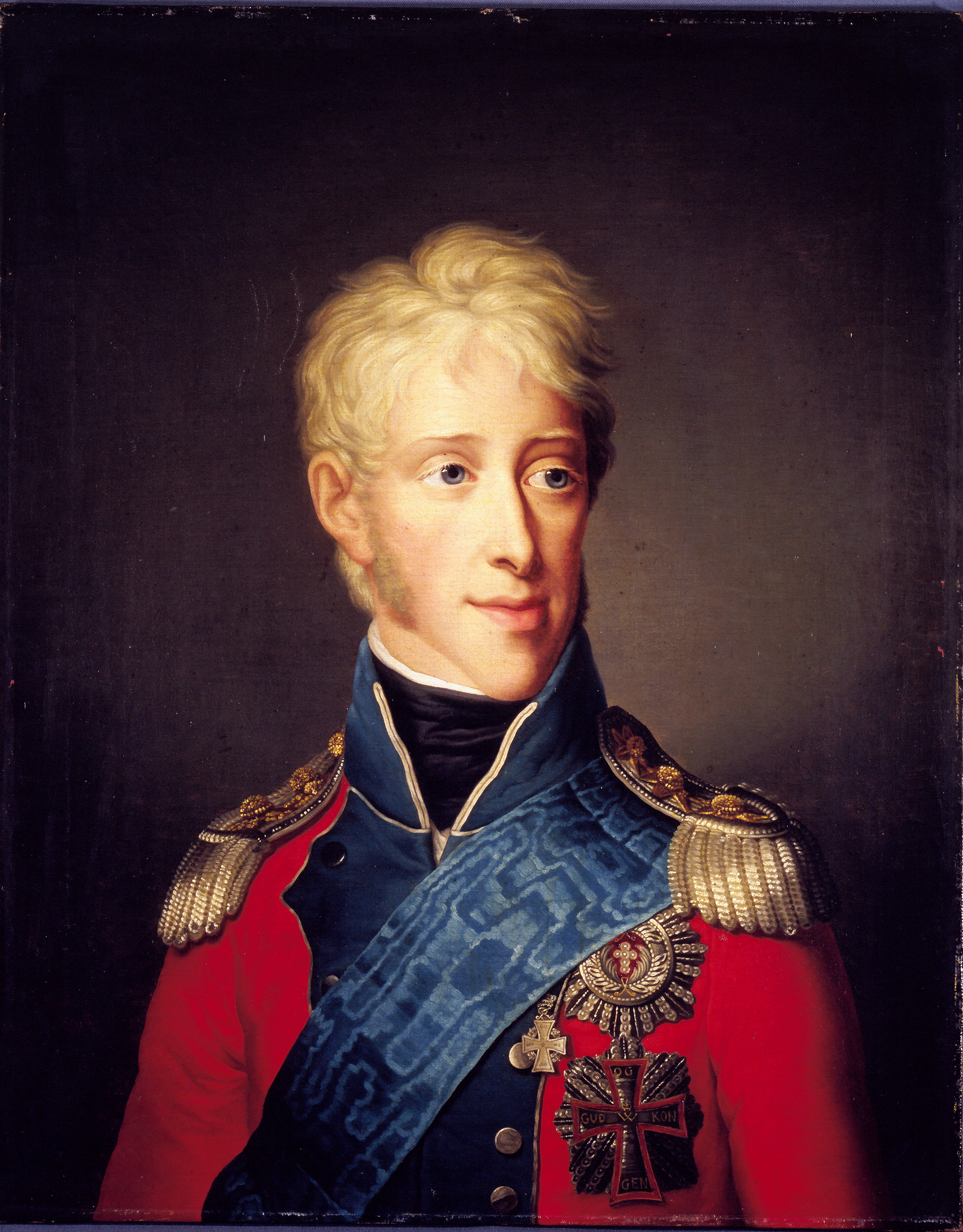
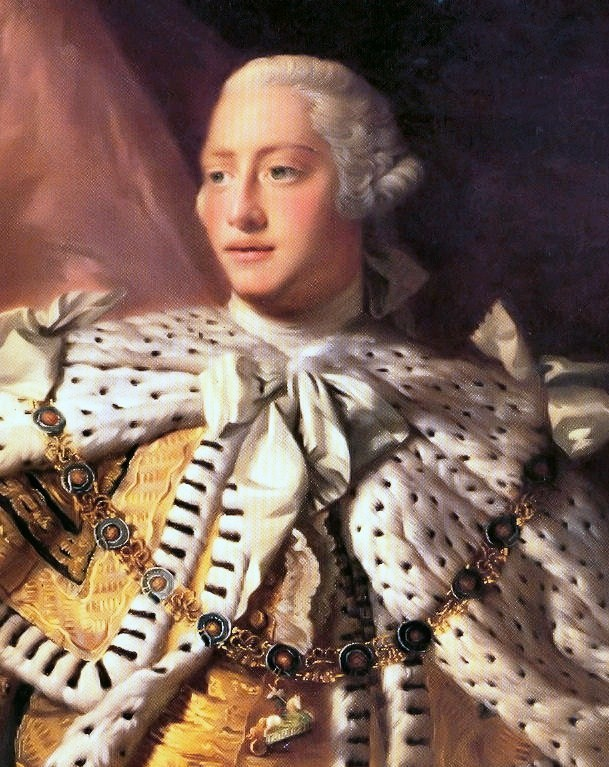
Frederick VI of Denmark (left) and George III

In article III, the United Kingdom was obliged to return all occupied Danish possessions to the Danish king. Excepted was the island of Heligoland, where George III was granted "full and unlimited sovereignty".

In article VI, the Danish king joined the anti-Napoleonic alliance, and obliged himself to maintain an army of 10,000 men that was to be joined to the Allied forces in Northern Germany and likewise be commanded by the Swedish crown prince. This Danish contingent was to be treated the same way the Swedish contingent was treated, and the Danish king was to receive an annual 400,000 pounds of British subsidies for maintenance and pay of the army, to be paid in monthly installments as soon as the army entered Allied service.

Article VIII was concerned with the abolishment of slave trade. In article X, Britain promised the Danish king to negotiate further compensation for Denmark's territorial cessions to Sweden in a pending final peace. In article XIII, older Dano-British treaties were confirmed.

The articles added in Brussels were concerned with the property of Danish subjects in the colonies or in ceded territories, which was to remain untouched by the British for the next three years, and equal treatment of Danish, British and Hanoveranian subjects, who were not to be prosecuted because of their participation in the war on different sides, nor because of their political or religious beliefs.

== Dano-Swedish treaty ==
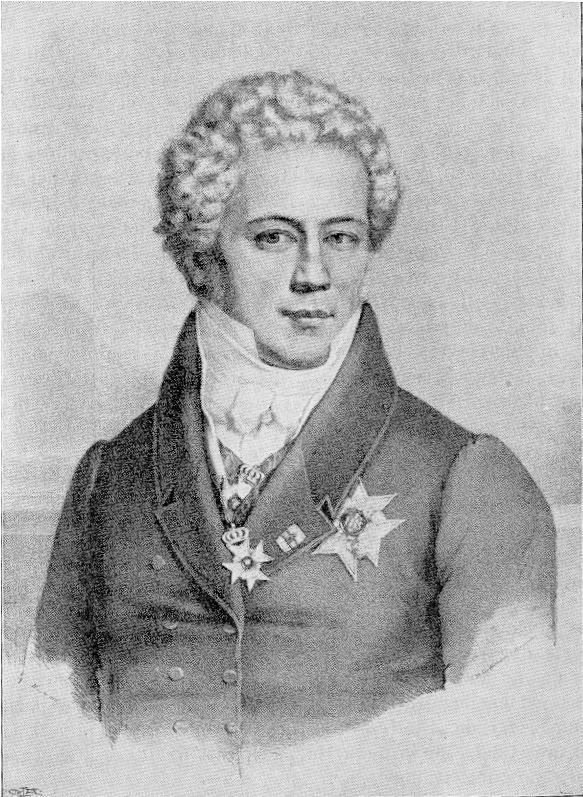
Wetterstedt

The treaty between the Kingdom of Denmark and the Kingdom of Sweden was negotiated by Danish diplomat Edmund Bourke (Burke) and Swedish envoy Baron Gustaf af Wetterstedt with British mediation. It consisted of 28 articles and one separate article. In article III, the Danish king promised to join the alliance against Napoleonic France, and with reference to the Dano-British treaty confirms his obligation to put part of his army under Swedish command.

In article IV, the Danish king in his and his successors' name "irrevocably and forever" renounced claims to the Kingdom of Norway, which would enter a union with Sweden under the Swedish king. The Norwegian kingdom was defined as consisting of the bishoprics of Christiansand, Bergen, Akershus and Trondheim, as well as the coastal islands and the northern regions of Nordland and Finnmark to the Russian border. Excepted were Greenland, Iceland and the Faroe Islands. The Norwegian subjects were freed of their obligations to the Danish king. In article VI, the Swedish crown took over the debts and financial obligations of Norway, which was to be determined by a joint Dano-Swedish commission.

Article VII ruled that Swedish Pomerania was to be handed over to Denmark. In article XV, it was ruled that the Swedish forces were to take over the Norwegian fortresses as soon as the treaty was ratified, and that they were to abandon Swedish Pomerania as soon as the Norwegian fortresses Fredriksten, Fredrikstad, Kongsvinger and Akershus were handed over. In article XIII, the Swedish king promised the Danish king to negotiate full compensation for the cession of Norway in a pending final peace, and the cession of Swedish Pomerania is described as a "proof" of this intention.

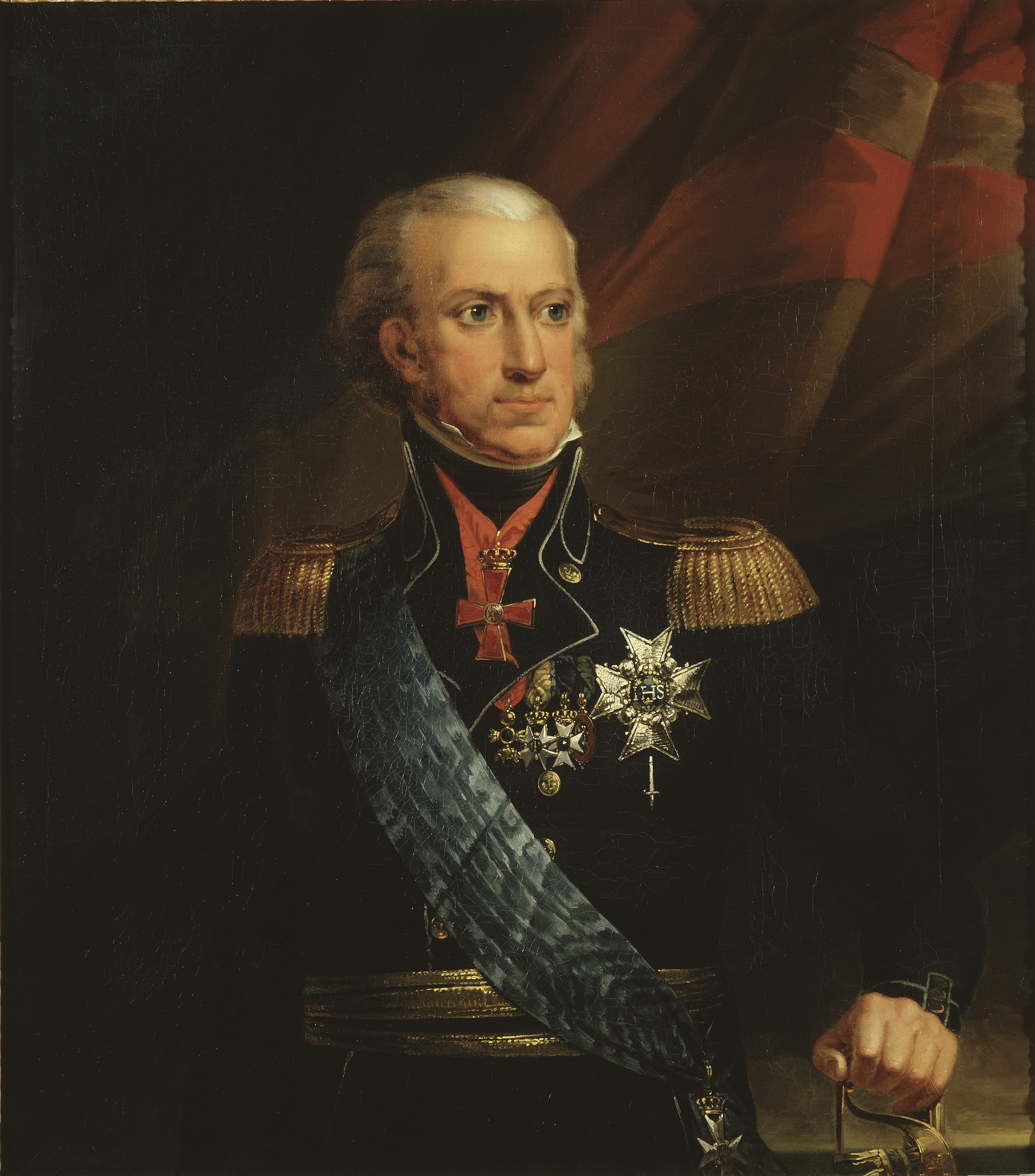
Charles XIII of Sweden

In article XII, the king of Sweden promised to maintain the Norwegian University of Christiania, and the Pomeranian University of Greifswald, which was to pass to Denmark according to article VII, and confirmed donations made before the exchange. Also, it was agreed in article XX that subjects of the Danish king could choose within the next six years whether they would finally settle in Norway or Denmark, whereby property in the realm which would not become the permanent residence was to be sold only to inhabitants of this realm. This provision was also enacted with respect to Swedish Pomerania. In article XVI, it was agreed that the governors general and all foreign-born officials of the exchanged territories, as long as they did not decide to remain, were removed from their offices. Article XXI obliged the Danish administration to hand over all civilian and military administrative documents and archives concerning Norway.

Article XVII provided for a mutual exchange of all prisoners of war. According to article XV, allied troops were to leave the Danish Duchy of Schleswig (Slesvig), but were allowed to remain in the German confederal Duchy of Holstein (Holsten), ruled in personal union with Denmark and Schleswig, to participate in the siege of Hamburg. In article XXVII, former Dano-Swedish peaces were confirmed as long as their provisions were not in conflict with the treaty of Kiel, namely the Treaty of Copenhagen (1660), the Treaty of Stockholm (June 1720), the Treaty of Frederiksborg (July 1720) and the Treaty of Jönköping (1809). A separate article was concerned with the cession of hostilities.

== Union between Sweden and Norway ==
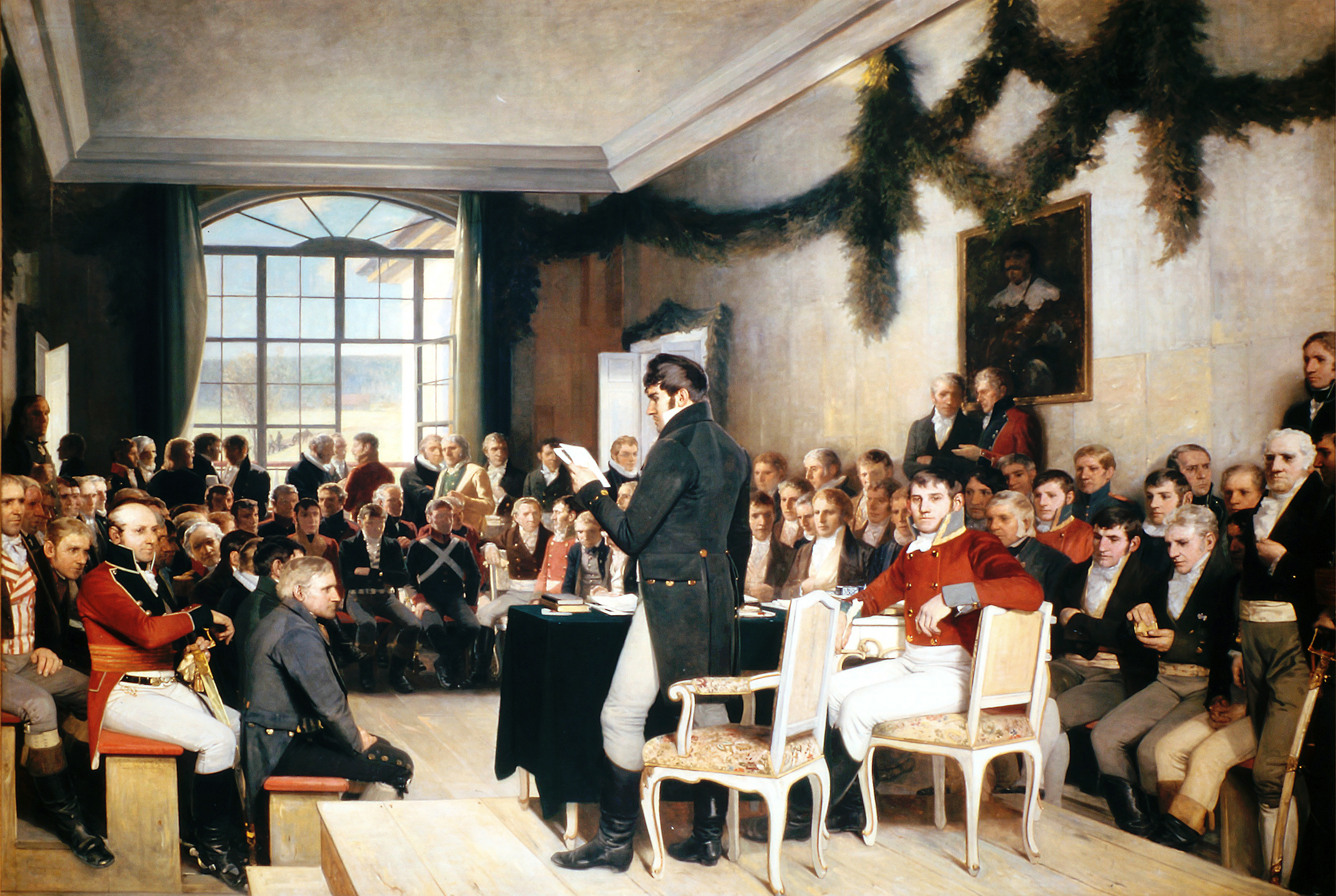
Norwegian Constituent Assembly at Eidsvoll 1814

The Swedish crown prince intended to invade Norway to enforce the Treaty of Kiel. This was supported by the majority of people living in Sweden. However, the Norwegian elite in Christiania supported resistance. The bishop Johan Nordahl Brun wrote to Claus Pavels and urged his religious colleagues in Christiania to grab their rifles so as to never surrender. There was a brief war but a ceasefire allowed for the union between Norway and Sweden to be established. The Norwegian Parliament voted for a constitution and elected the Swedish king to the Norwegian throne. So Danish sovereignty over Norway was superseded with Swedish sovereignty over Norway. As of 1814 a distinction was made between genuine Norwegians and those allegedly un-Norwegian. The Norwegian elite used this identity labeling to resist Swedification.

=== Swedish Pomerania ===
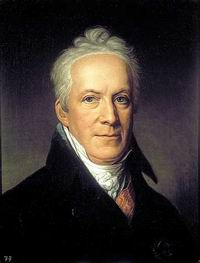
Hardenberg

Due to the refusal of Norway to subordinate itself to the Swedish king, Charles XIII of Sweden did not hand over Swedish Pomerania to Frederick VI of Denmark. The problem was solved at the Congress of Vienna, when the Great Powers followed a plan worked out by Karl August von Hardenberg, prime minister of the Kingdom of Prussia, who proposed a ring exchange of territories and payments between the Kingdom of Denmark, the Kingdom of Hanover (ruled in personal union with Great Britain and Ireland), the Kingdom of Prussia and the Kingdom of Sweden.

According to Hardenberg's plan, Prussia ceded East Frisia with Emden to Hanover, and in exchange received from Hanover the Duchy of Lauenburg. This duchy was then handed over from Prussia to Denmark, along with an additional payment of 3.5 million thalers. Prussia also took over a Danish debt to Sweden of 600,000 thalers, and agreed on an additional payment of 2 million thalers to Sweden. Denmark and Sweden in turn relinquished their claims to Swedish Pomerania in favour of Prussia. Charles XIII of Sweden then released his Pomeranian subjects from their obligations towards Sweden on 1 October 1815, and on 23 October the province was handed over to von Ingersleben, president of Prussian Pomerania.

== North Atlantic territories ==
In article IV, an insertion was added to the original Swedish draft, namely that "Greenland, the Faroe Islands and Iceland are not included therein." The wording and interpretation of this addition has been debatted since the signing; however, it is known that the Danish diplomat, Edmund Bourke, formulated the insertion and wanted it added to the article. What is furthermore known, is that both the Swedish negotiatior, Gustaf af Wetterstedt, and King Charles XIV John did not reject the addition. Nothing indicates that the Swedish side wished or meant anything else than mainland Norway. According to the Norwegian and Danish historians, Ståle Dyrvik and Ole Feldbæk, respectively, Bourke's clarifying insertion can be understood as an exclusion of future Swedish claims based on the interpretation of the term "dependencies" (French: dépendances), which was used to describe the North Atlantic territories in their relationship to Norway.

=== East Greenland case ===
Eirik Raudes (Erik the Red's) Land (red)

Between 1931 and 1933, Norway contested the Danish possession of all of Greenland at the Permanent Court of International Justice in The Hague. As of December 2008, this was the only case where possession of a polar territory was ever decided by an international court.

The Norwegian side argued that Denmark did not hold rights to any part of the island where she did not exact actual sovereignty, and accordingly proclaimed a Norwegian Eirik Raudes Land in eastern Greenland on 10 July 1931, which had been occupied in the previous month. On 5 April 1933 however, the court ruled that on the basis of the Treaty of Kiel and subsequent treaties, Denmark was the sovereign over the whole of Greenland.

== See also ==
- History of Sweden
- History of Denmark
- History of Norway
- Scandinavia

== Sources ==
- Barton, Dunbar Plunket (1925). Bernadotte: Prince and King 1810–1844. London: John Murray. ASIN B0008732TG. OCLC 4960538.
- Barton, Dunbar Plunket (1930). The Amazing Career of Bernadotte 1763–1844. Boston: Houghton Mifflin Company.
- Brandslet, Steinar (11 August 2015). "Medieval Norwegian realm comes under the microscope". Norwegian SciTech News. ISSN 2703-7029.
- Büsch, Otto [in German] (1992). Handbuch der preußischen Geschichte [Handbook of Prussian History] (in German). Vol. 3. Walter de Gruyter. ISBN 3-11-008322-1.
- Caiani, Ambrogio A.; Broers, Michael (2019). A History of the European Restorations: Governments, States and Monarchy. Bloomsbury Publishing. ISBN 9781786736581.
- Cavell, Janice (December 2008). "Historical Evidence and the Eastern Greenland Case" (PDF). Arctic. 61 (4): 433–441.
- Cranshaw, Friedrich L. (2007). Insolvenz- und finanzrechtliche Perspektiven der Insolvenz von juristischen Personen des öffentlichen Rechts, insbesondere Kommunen [Insolvency and financial law perspectives of the insolvency of legal entities under public law, in particular municipalities. Writings on German, European and International Insolvency Law]. Schriften zum deutschen, europäischen und internationalen Insolvenzrecht (in German). Vol. 7. Walter de Gruyter. ISBN 978-3-89949-389-4.
- Dörr, Oliver [in German] (2004). Kompendium völkerrechtlicher Rechtsprechung [Compendium of International Law Jurisprudence] (in German). Mohr Siebeck. ISBN 3-16-148311-1.
- Ghillany, Friedrich Wilhelm (1855). Diplomatisches Handbuch. Sammlung der wichtigsten europaeischen Friedensschluesse, Congressacten und sonstigen Staatsurkunden, vom westphaelischen Frieden bis auf die neueste Zeit [Diplomatic Handbook. Collection of the Most Important European Peace Conventions, Congress Acts and Other State Certificates, from the Westphalia Peace to the Modern Period] (in German). Vol. 2. Nördlingen: C. H. Beck. hdl:2027/njp.32101077785630. OCLC 3128724.
- Olesen, Jens E. (2008). "Schwedisch-Pommern in der schwedischen Politik nach 1806". In North, Michael; Riemer, Robert (eds.). Das Ende des Alten Reiches im Ostseeraum. Wahrnehmungen und Transformationen (in German). Böhlau. pp. 274–292. ISBN 978-3-412-20108-1.
- Schäfer, Anton (2002). Zeittafel der Rechtsgeschichte. Von den Anfängen über Rom bis 1919. Mit Schwerpunkt Österreich und zeitgenössischen Bezügen (in German) (3 ed.). Edition Europa Verlag. ISBN 3-9500616-8-1.
- Jenssen-Tusch, Georg Friedrich [in Danish] (1852). Zur Regierungsgeschichte Friedrich VI. Königs von Dänemark, Herzogs von Schleswig, Holstein und Lauenburg (in German). Vol. 2. Verlag Schröder.
- Sundberg, Ulf (2010). Sveriges krig: 1630–1814 (in Swedish). Vol. 3. Svenskt Militärhistoriskt Biblioteks Förlag och författaren.
- Dyrvik, Ståle; Feldbæk, Ole (1996). Mellom brødre 1780–1830 (in Norwegian). H. Aschehoug & Co.
