= Edward R. Rayher =

American politician (1883–1958)

Edward Richard Rayher (August 20, 1883 – May 12, 1958) was an American lawyer and politician from New York. He was a member of the New York State Assembly.

== Life ==
Rayher was born on August 20, 1883, in New York City, New York, the son of John Rayher and Mary Ann Leyden.

Rayher attended school in Troy. He went to Syracuse University from 1905 to 1909, where he was a member of Phi Kappa Psi and Phi Delta Phi. He graduated from there with a Ph.B. in 1909. He then went to Albany Law School and worked on the editorial staff of law publisher Edward Thompson Co. in Northport. He graduated from Albany Law School in 1911. He was admitted to the bar that year and opened a law office in New York City. He worked as an attorney for Globe Indemnity Company for three years, after which he entered a general law practice. He retired from his practice in 1955.

Rayher was in charge of the New York State Comptroller's inheritance tax division from 1915 to 1917. From 1917 to 1919, he was assistant counsel of the State Industrial Commission and in charge of compensation appeals. In 1920, he was elected to the New York State Assembly as a Republican, representing the New York County 9th District. He served in the Assembly in 1921 and 1922.

Rayher served as referee of the New York Supreme Court, Appellate Division from 1922 to 1949. He was chairman of the New York County Lawyers' Association committee on domestic relations, and was active in promoting the revision of inheritance law and reforming laws related to juvenile delinquency. He resided in Hartsdale at one point, although he left there by the time he died.

Rayher was a member of the New York State Bar Association. In 1913, he married Agatha Elizabeth Gruber. They had one child, Edward.

Rayher died in St. Joseph's Hospital in Paterson, New Jersey on May 12, 1958.

New York State Assembly
Preceded by Martin Bourke	New York State Assembly; New York County, 9th District; 1921–1922	Succeeded by John H. Conroy
