= Paddy Bourke =

Paddy Bourke may refer to:

- Paddy Bourke (footballer) (1883–1930), Australian rules footballer
- Paddy Bourke (politician), Irish politician

== See also ==
- Pat Bourke (disambiguation)
