= Ted Bourke (footballer, born 1925) =

Australian rules footballer

Personal information
- Full name: Edward Thomas Bourke
- Born: 13 November 1925; Ballarat East, Victoria
- Died: 30 July 2014 (aged 88)
- Original team: East Ballarat
- Height: 183 cm (6 ft 0 in)
- Weight: 83 kg (183 lb)

Playing career^{1}
| Years | Club | Games (Goals) |
| 1946–47 | North Melbourne | 5 (0) |
- ^{1} Playing statistics correct to the end of 1947.

Edward Thomas Bourke (13 November 1925 – 30 July 2014) was an Australian rules footballer who played with North Melbourne in the Victorian Football League (VFL).

== Personal life ==
Bourke served as a private in the Australian Army during the Second World War.
