= GenesisCare =

Australia-based cancer care company

GenesisCare (not to be confused with Genesis Health System of Iowa, or Genesis HealthCare of Pennsylvania) is the largest provider of cancer care services in Australia, and have cancer treatment centers in the United States, United Kingdom, and Spain. The company was founded by Dan Collins in Brisbane in 2005. China Resources Group and Macquarie Capital bought 56% of the company for A$1.7 billion in July 2016. At that time, it was said to be treating more than 2,500 patients a day in more than 150 locations. The doctors and managers have a substantial stake in the business. It plans to continue to expand in the United Kingdom, Spain, China and the US.

== Australia ==
The company operates Oncology services in New South Wales, Queensland, South Australia, Victoria and Western Australia including in two large public hospitals on behalf of the state government of Western Australia. It treats more than 26,000 Australians a year, employs 1,400 people and has 125 clinics.

== England ==
Cancer Partners UK launched its first radiotherapy treatment centre in the UK in 2009. GenesisCare bought the firm's eight cancer centres in 2015. It now runs diagnostic and treatment centres in Milton Keynes, Oxford and Maidstone. The Cancer treatment centre in Elstree is run in conjunction with Spire Healthcare's Bushey Hospital. Its radiotherapy centres in Birmingham, Guildford, Nottingham, Portsmouth and Southampton are in or near private hospitals. It is opening a centre in Windsor in 2017.

In 2022 it plans to open a new £20 million cancer treatment centre in Edgbaston which will use ViewRay MRIdian SMART technology which can see and track soft tissue and tumours in real time.

== Spain ==
It has 17 centres in Spain after the purchase of IMOncology and Oncosur Group during 2016.

== United States ==
In late 2019 GenesisCare acquired 21st Century Oncology for approximately $1.5 billion.

On June 1, 2023, GenesisCare filed for Chapter 11 bankruptcy.
