= Charles Bourke =

Irish priest

Charles Bourke (c. 1765 – 1820) was an Irish priest.

== Background ==
Bourke was born in Carrowcubick, near Ballycastle, County Mayo, about 1765. Brendan Hoban states that he "was of that branch of the Bourke family that became known as the 'Heathfield' Bourkes, whose base was at Heathfield House, in the townland of Gortatoor, a few miles from what is now the village of Ballycastle" (p. 12, Hoban, 2008).

He was a descendant of Oliver fitz Richard Ruadh Bourke, and a brother of Walter Kittagh Bourke; Oliver's nephew, Tibbot MacWalter Kittagh Bourke (died c. 1606) was the 21st Mac William Iochtar. Oliver second wife, Mary, was a sister of Tiobóid, and Mary's son, Ulick, had a son, Oliver, who married Elizabeth Rutledge. From this marriage came the Bourkes of Heathfield, the Palmer-Bourke and Paget-Bourke families. Descendants include Mary Robinson, President of Ireland from 1990 to 1997, and the United Nations High Commissioner for Human Rights, from 1997 to 2002, whose great-great-grandfather was John Bourke of Heathfield, a brother of Charles.

Little seems to be known about Charles's parents beyond their names, Rowland Bourke and Mary Cormick, and that they were of a branch of the Heathfield family known as the Crotty Bourkes, as they had property in the townland of Crott, Carrowcubick. Among their family were John, Charles, and Ulick, a Franciscan.

However, Bourke's family possessed enough wealth to have Charles educated at the Irish College, Salamanca in Spain following being taught at a local hedge school. He was ordained in 1792.

== Baton Rouge ==
He volunteered for service in Spanish Louisiana, becoming the first priest of Baton Rouge in 1792. Following an investigation into his conducted by the Bishop of New Orleans, he left Louisiana, returning to County Mayo in 1800.

== Red River Mission ==
In 1811, he became chaplain for a proposed colony of Irish Catholics and Scottish Presbyterians at what is now Red River, Manitoba, Minnesota and North Dakota, initiated by Lord Thomas Selkirk. However, he left without permission of his bishop, Dominick Bellew. he returned home in 1812 having never reached Red River.

== Appointment of Peter Waldron ==
In 1812, Bourke became involved with a dispute over the appointment of a priest from the Diocese of Tuam, Peter Waldron, who was to succeed Bishop Bellew. Upon Waldron's appointment, Bourke continued his opposition. In 1817 he published a pamphlet, Popish Episcopal Tyranny Exposed, which led to his suspension and - according to his own account - excommunication. He appealed to Pope Pius VII.

== Popish Episcopal Tyranny Exposed ==
In the forty-eight page pamphlet, Bourke gave his reasons for his opposition to Waldron's appointment, but also pondered on wider questions:

"That the lives of the Roman Catholic clergy, at this day in Ireland, as well as on the continent, are not much more correct than those of the clergy at the time of the Reformation, which Martin Luther inveighed against them, is a melancholy truth, which cannot be denied; and which ought to make a serious impression on the minds of those who justly appreciate our most holy religion, which may suffer at present, as it did formerly, from the severe scourge of one of its own members." (p. 172, Hoban, 2008)

According to his biographer, Brendan Hoban:

"Bourke could hardly set himself up as a model of priesthood and his disloyalty to the priests who stood up for him does him no service. ... The key ... to understanding Bourke's comprehensive denunciation of his fellow clergy ... is that Bourke had conformed to the Established Church and the main readers of his writing were his now fellow Protestants ... So Bourke's comments have to be placed in the context of the cut and thrust of the Bible War, what Desmond Bowen called the 'Protestant crusade in Ireland', the evangelical campaign organised by fundamentalists in the Church of Ireland to convert Catholics in a 'Second Reformation.'"(p. 173, Hoban, 2008)

Summing him up, Hoban describes Charles Bourke as "A flamboyant character" with "a very individual sense of humor ... He loved song, dance and drink and could be both the best and the worst of company. His great flaw was that he was always right. He was effortlessly tetchy and contentious, forever falling out with those around him, incapable of seeing other perspectives, incapable of compromise. ... He lived in interesting times and, from what we know of him, it was a fascinating adventure." (pp. 181–182, Hoban, 2008)
