= Ken Bourke =

Australian rugby league footballer

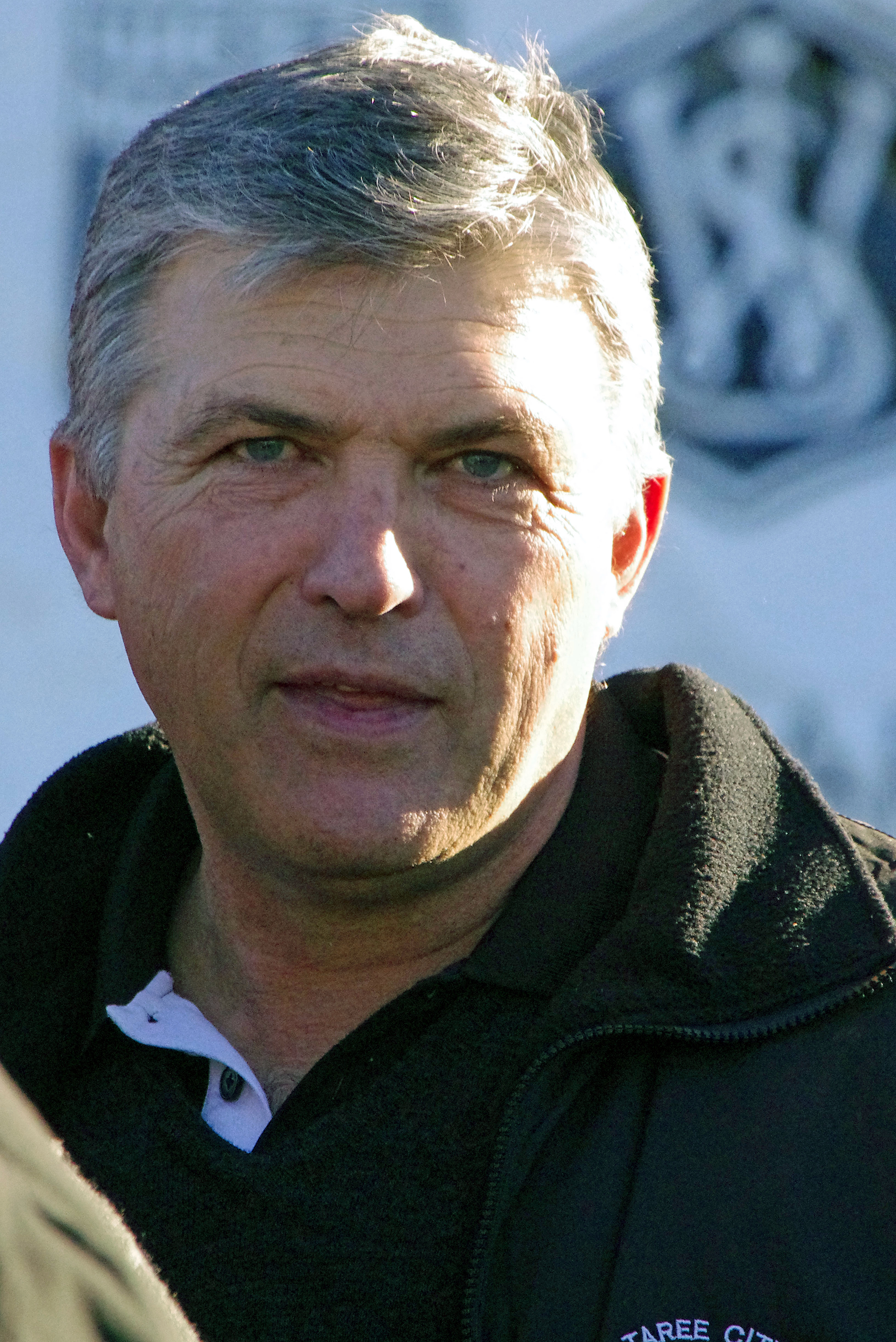

Personal information
- Full name: Kenneth Mark Bourke
- Born: 23 May 1957 (age 69) Bourke, New South Wales, Australia

Playing information
- Position: Wing
Club
Years	Team	Pld	T	G	FG	P
1977	Western Suburbs	5	0	0	0	0

Ken Bourke (born 23 May 1957) is a former professional rugby league footballer who played first-grade for the Western Suburbs Magpies. Ken is a successful NRL SuperCoach player, his team Kenneth's Maggies finished inside the top 1000 in 2023.
