= Baron Bourke of Brittas =

Title in the Peerage of Ireland

Baron Bourke of Brittas Barún Búrc de Brittas
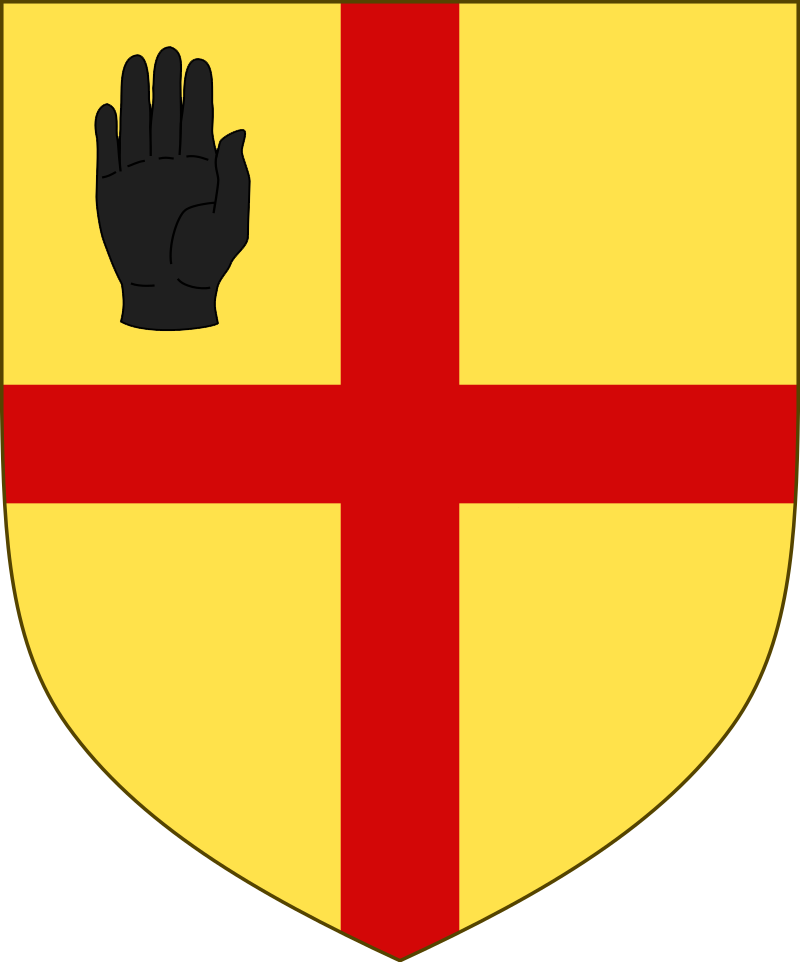
- Arms: of Bourke: Or, a cross gules, in the first quarter a dexter hand couped at the wrist and erect sable. Crest: A Cat-a-Mountain sejant guardant proper, collared and chained Or. Supporters: Two Cats-a-Mountain sejant guardant proper, collared and chained Or.
- Creation date: 17 February 1618
- Created by: James I
- Peerage: Peerage of Ireland
- First holder: Theobald Bourke
- Last holder: Theobald Bourke
- Status: Forfeited
- Extinction date: 1691

Baron Bourke of Brittas (Irish: Barún Búrc de Brittas; English: /bɜːrk/; BURK), of the County of Limerick, was a title in the Peerage of Ireland created on 17 February 1618 for Theobald Bourke.

Theobald Burke was the son of Theobald Bourke, son of William Bourke, 1st Baron Bourke of Castleconnell (see Baron Bourke of Castleconnell) and Lady Mary Burke. He was the younger brother of John Bourke, 2nd Baron Bourke of Castleconnell, and Richard Bourke, 3rd Baron Bourke of Castleconnell. In 1653, the first Baron's estates were seized following the Cromwellian conquest of Ireland and granted to Sir Charles Coote. Following the Stuart Restoration, under the Act of Settlement 1662, the second Baron had the estates partially restored to him.

The third Baron was attainted in 1691 due to his loyalty to James II of England before and during the War of the Two Kings. The title was consequently forfeited, although the third Baron's descendants continued to use the title.

== Barons Bourke of Brittas (1618) ==
- Theobald Bourke, 1st Baron Bourke of Brittas (died 1654)
- John Bourke, 2nd Baron Bourke of Brittas (died 1668)
- Theobald Bourke, 3rd Baron Bourke of Brittas (died after 1691)

== See also ==
- House of Burgh, an Anglo-Norman and Hiberno-Norman dynasty founded in 1193
- Baron Bourke of Castleconnell
- Sir Edmund de Burgh (1298–1338), Irish knight and ancestor of the Burke family of Clanwilliam
