= Edmund Bourke (1761–1821) =

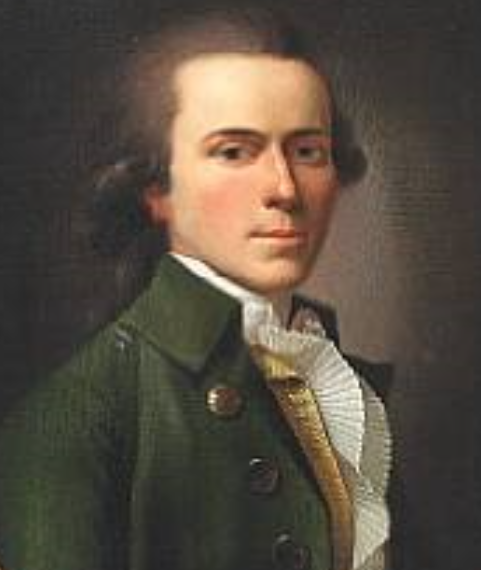

Envoy to Poland
- In office 1790–1792

Envoy to the Kingdom of Naples
- In office 1792

Envoy to Sweden
- In office 1797

Envoy to Spain
- In office 1801

Personal details
- Born: November 2, 1761 St. Croix, Danish West Indies
- Died: August 12, 1821 (aged 59) Vichy, France
- Spouse: Maria Assunta Leonida Butini
- Known for: negotiating the Treaty of Kiel
- Awards: Grand Cross of the Order of the Dannebrog

Count Edmund Bourke, also Edmond or Edmound Burke (2 November 1761 in St. Croix, Danish West Indies – 12 August 1821 in Vichy, France) was a Danish diplomat who negotiated and signed the Treaty of Kiel.

== Early life and family ==
Edmund Bourke was born in Danish-ruled St. Croix, where his father, Theobald Bourke, was a plantation owner and later judge. Theobald Bourke originally came from Ireland but obtained Danish citizenship in 1779.

== Career ==
Edmund Bourke inherited a considerable fortune from his father and pursued a career as a Danish diplomat. In 1789 he became chargé d'affaires to Poland and from 1790 to 1792 he was envoy to Poland, where he won the goodwill of King Stanislaus, who made him a knight of the Order of the White Eagle. In 1792 Bourke was sent as an envoy to the Kingdom of Naples, in 1797 to Stockholm and in 1801 to Spain, and he resided in Madrid for several years. In appreciation of his work, Bourke was made a Chamberlain in 1793 and in 1811 was awarded the Grand Cross of the Order of the Dannebrog.

In January 1814 Bourke negotiated the Treaty of Kiel with Sweden and England. Bourke showed skill and determination despite Denmark's poor negotiating position, having been on the losing side before switching to the Allied side after the Battle of Leipzig. Under the treaty the United Kingdom returned all occupied Danish possessions other than the island of Heligoland, and the Danish king ceded Norway to the Kingdom of Sweden. On 8 February Russia was added to the peace treaty at Hanover.

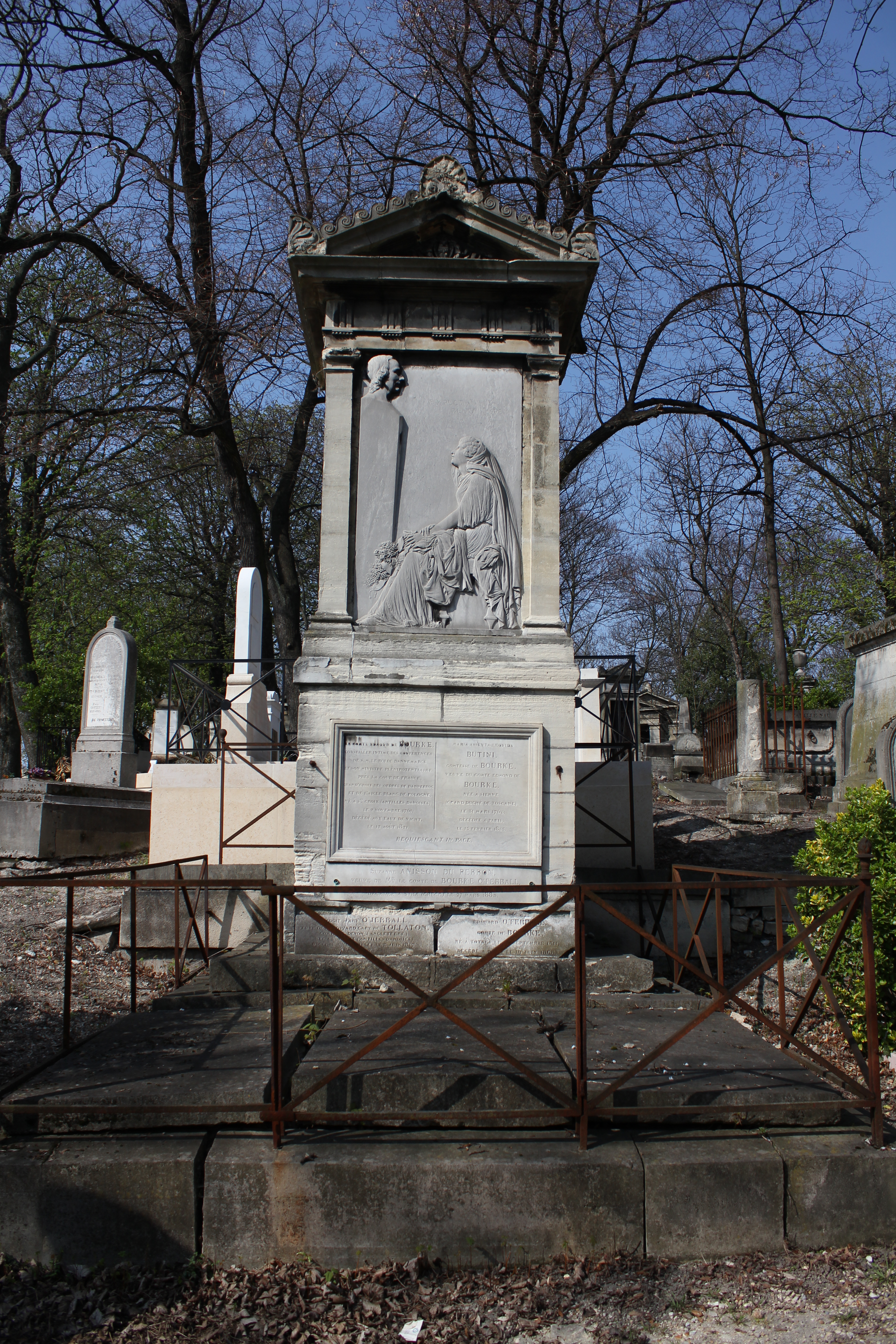
Tomb of Bourke in Paris

Bourke succeeded in obtaining as tolerable terms as possible, so that, for example, part of the Danish-Norwegian government debt was transferred to Norway by its separation from Denmark, and that the Faroe Islands, Iceland and Greenland remained with Denmark. Bourke undeniably was assisted by the fact that the Swedish negotiator had no idea that these islands had previously belonged to Norway. The exemption formulated by Bourke was an addition to the Swedish draft treaty but the desire to clarify the exception of the Atlantic islands seems to have arisen as a consequence of English policy. Bourke became a Danish Privy Councillor in recognition of his work.

Later Bourke was sent to the English court and in 1820 to France. However, Bourke quickly died in 1821 and was buried in Père-Lachaise Cemetery in Paris.

== Personal life ==
Bourke married Maria Assunta Leonida Butini in 1798, a good-natured, lively Neapolitan woman who was his mistress before she became his wife.

== Bibliography ==
- Dörr, Oliver (2004). Kompendium völkerrechtlicher Rechtsprechung (in German). Mohr Siebeck. ISBN 3-16-148311-1.
- Schäfer, Anton (2002). Zeittafel der Rechtsgeschichte. Von den Anfängen über Rom bis 1919. Mit Schwerpunkt Österreich und zeitgenössischen Bezügen (in German) (3 ed.). Edition Europa Verlag. ISBN 3-9500616-8-1.
