= Baron Bourke of Castleconnell =

Title in the Peerage of Ireland

Baron Bourke of Castleconnell Barún Búrc de Caisleán Uí Chonaill
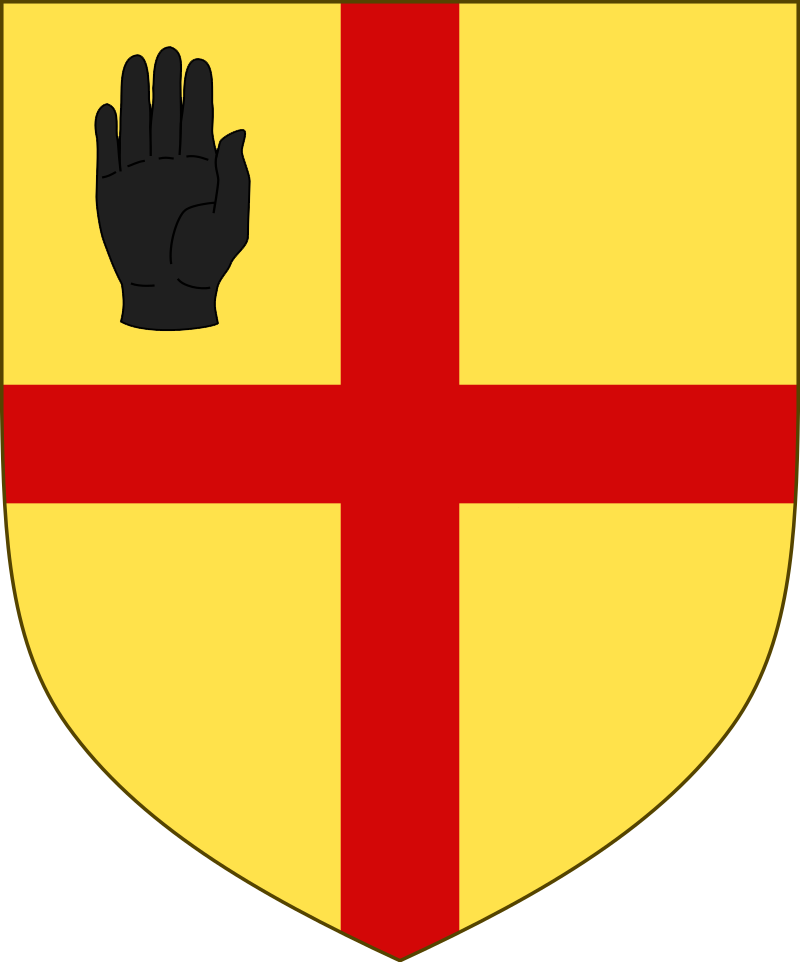
- Arms: of Bourke: Or, a cross gules, in the first quarter a dexter hand couped at the wrist and erect sable. Crest: A Cat-a-Mountain sejant guardant proper, collared and chained Or. Supporters: Two Cats-a-Mountain sejant guardant proper, collared and chained Or.
- Creation date: 16 May 1580
- Created by: Elizabeth I
- Peerage: Peerage of Ireland
- First holder: William Bourke, 1st Baron Bourke of Connell
- Last holder: William Bourke, 8th Baron Bourke of Connell
- Status: Forfeited
- Extinction date: 1691
- Seat: Castle Connell

Baron Bourke of Castleconnell (Irish: Barún Búrc de Caisleán Uí Chonaill; English: /bɜːrk/; BURK) was a title in the Peerage of Ireland created on 16 May 1580 for Sir William Bourke. The eighth baron was attainted and the barony forfeited in 1691.

== Barons Bourke of Castleconnell (1580) ==
- William Bourke, 1st Baron Bourke of Connell (died 1584)
- John Bourke, 2nd Baron Bourke of Connell (died 1592)
- Richard Bourke, 3rd Baron Bourke of Connell (died 1599)
- Thomas Bourke, 4th Baron Bourke of Connell (died 1599)
- Edmund Bourke, 5th Baron Bourke of Connell (1598-1638)
- William Bourke, 6th Baron Bourke of Connell (died c. 1665)
- Thomas Bourke, 7th Baron Bourke of Connell (died c. 1680)
- William Bourke, 8th Baron Bourke of Connell (died c. 1691) (forfeit 1691 for being loyal to King James II )

== See also ==
- House of Burgh, an Anglo-Norman and Hiberno-Norman dynasty founded in 1193
- Baron Bourke of Brittas
- Sir Edmund de Burgh (1298–1338), Irish knight and ancestor of the Burke family of Clanwilliam
