= Latika Bourke =

Australian journalist (born 1984)

- Born: Latika M. Bourke; 9 March 1984 (age 42); Bihar, India
- Education: Charles Sturt University
- Occupations: Journalist, author
- Website: Latika Bourke on X

Latika M. Bourke (born 9 March 1984) is an Australian author and journalist. She writes for The Sydney Morning Herald and The Age, and in the past has worked for the Australian Broadcasting Corporation and 2UE. Her book From India with Love was published in 2015.

== Life and career ==
Latika Bourke was born in Bihar, India on 9 March 1984. The daughter of a 14-year-old mother, Bourke was left at a Catholic orphanage in Bettiah in the care of nuns when she was less than a week old.

Bourke came to Australia in December 1984, adopted by Penny and John Bourke at the age of eight months. In her early childhood, Bourke lived with her family on a farm outside Bathurst, New South Wales. Bourke and her family moved into Bathurst when she was seven years old.

From 2002 to 2005, Bourke studied journalism at Charles Sturt University. During that time she did work experience at radio station 2BS in Bathurst, writing, producing and reading local news, and hosting programs. Before her official graduation in 2006, Bourke was recruited by Sydney radio station 2UE to work as a reporter.

In 2007, while on the job as a reporter for 2UE, Bourke was verbally abused and told to "cover up" whilst waiting to interview a Muslim cleric who had previously given a sermon comparing uncovered women to exposed meat. She was outside Lakemba Mosque, wearing a long trench coat, knee-high boots and gloves.

In December 2010, the Australian Broadcasting Commission announced Bourke would be its first 'social media reporter' tasked with reporting primarily via social media. In 2014, Bourke announced she would be leaving the Australian Broadcasting Commission for Fairfax Media, but staying in the Canberra Press Gallery.

Bourke's book, From India with Love, about her journey of self-discovery, was published in 2015. She has said that she gives half of the royalties she earns from sales of her book to orphanages in India.

In December 2015, Bourke announced she would be leaving the Canberra Press Gallery and moving to London at the end of January 2016.

== Awards and honours ==
In June 2010, Bourke won the Walkley Award for Young Australian Journalist of the Year, having entered three stories: one on Joe Hockey's leadership aspirations in the Liberal party while in opposition, a second on Nick Minchin's campaign against an emissions trading scheme and a third on Tony Abbott's challenge of Malcolm Turnbull to become leader of the opposition.
