= Paddy Bourke (footballer) =

Australian rules footballer

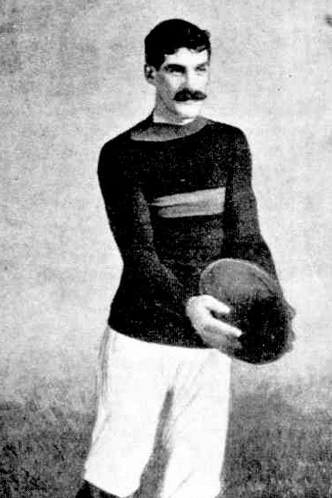
- Bourke in 1910

Personal information
- Full name: Patrick Bourke
- Born: 26 March 1883; Gordon, Victoria
- Died: 26 February 1930 (aged 46); Ballarat, Victoria
- Original team: South Ballarat
- Height: 185 cm (6 ft 1 in)
- Weight: 83 kg (183 lb)
- Position: Ruck

Playing career^{1}
Years	Club	Games (Goals)
1909–11	Richmond	38 (28)
- ^{1} Playing statistics correct to the end of 1911.

Patrick Bourke (26 March 1883 – 26 February 1930) was an Australian rules footballer who played with Richmond in the Victorian Football League (VFL).
