= Bill Bourke (footballer, born 1882) =

Australian rules footballer

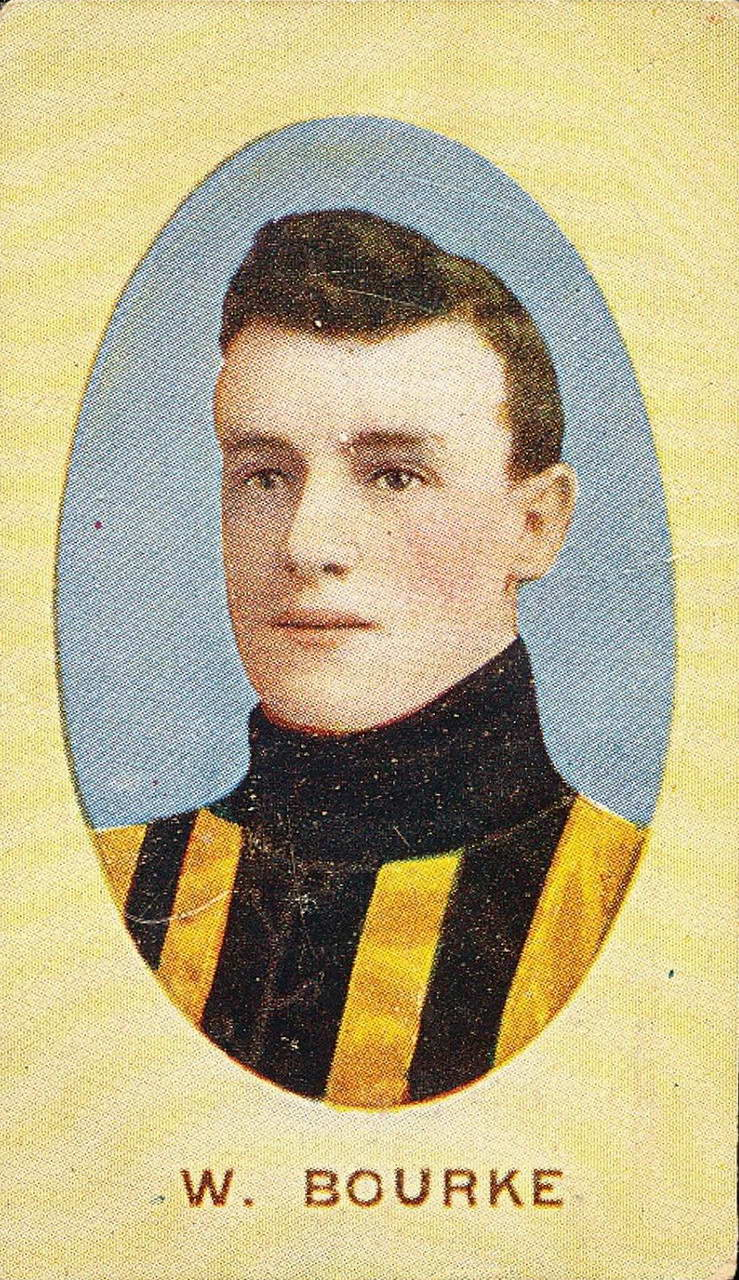
- Cigarette card of Bourke in 1910

Personal information
- Full name: William Bourke
- Born: 23 July 1882; Collingwood, Melbourne, Australia
- Died: 13 November 1932 (aged 50); Middle Park, Victoria
- Original team: Collingwood Trades
- Position: Full Forward

Playing career^{1}
Years	Club	Games (Goals)
1908–1909	Richmond	32 (45)
- ^{1} Playing statistics correct to the end of 1909.

Bill Bourke (23 July 1882 – 13 November 1932) was an Australian rules footballer who played with the Richmond Football Club in the Victorian Football League (VFL).

Bourke had the distinction of topping Richmond's goal-kicking in their first two VFL seasons, in 1908 and 1909, with 25 and 20 goals respectively. He along with family members was a strong Collingwood supporter and actually first tried to play for Collingwood. Upon being denied a game as a Magpie he decided to play with Richmond who were just entering the VFL. He retired after just two seasons to drive a taxi as it paid more than his wage as a footballer. He later ran a boot factory, which employed many league footballers and was the largest in the southern hemisphere at the time. He died suddenly of a heart attack in 1932 leaving a family of six children behind.
