= Thomas Bourke (cricketer) =

Irish cricketer

Personal information
- Full name: Thomas Joseph Deane Bourke
- Born: 7 February 1815; Ireland
- Died: 28 February 1875 (aged 60); England

Domestic team information
- Years: Team
- 1844–1845: Hampshire
- 1843: Marylebone Cricket Club

Career statistics
Competition	FC
Matches	4
Runs scored	25
Batting average	5.00
100s/50s	–/–
Top score	8
Balls bowled	–
Wickets	–
Bowling average	–
5 wickets in innings	–
10 wickets in match	–
Best bowling	–
Catches/stumpings	2/–
- Source: Cricinfo, 5 March 2010

Thomas Joseph Deane Bourke (7 February 1815 – 28 February 1875) was an Irish first-class cricketer.

Bourke made his first-class debut for Marylebone Cricket Club (MCC) against Hampshire in 1843. This was his only first-class match for MCC.

In 1844 Bourke made his debut for Hampshire against Marylebone Cricket Club. In 1845 Bourke played two further first-class matches for Hampshire against the Marylebone Cricket Club and Petworth Cricket Club.
