= Martin Bourke (politician) =

American politician

Martin Bourke (December 1, 1867 – April 8, 1939) was an American lawyer and politician from New York.

== Life ==
Bourke was born on December 1, 1867, in Bridgeport, Connecticut, the son of Martin Bourke and Anna MacNamara.

Bourke initially attended the local public school and Staples Academy in Easton. He moved with his parents to a farm in Easton when he was nine, living there for the next six years. When he was fifteen, he moved to the Upper West Side in New York City. He initially worked in the drug business, becoming a licensed pharmacist before he was twenty-one. He then studied law at New York Law School, graduating from there in 1893. He was admitted to the bar in 1894 and began practicing law.

Bourke ran for the New York State Assembly as a Republican in New York County's 17th District in 1912 and 1913, losing both elections to Democrat Mark Eisner. He was elected to the Assembly in that district in 1914 and served in the Assembly in 1915. He lost the re-election that year during a Democratic landslide to Vincent Gilroy. He was elected back to the Assembly in 1916 and served in 1917 and 1918. In the latter year, he represented the newly reappropriated 9th District. He lost the 1918 election to Democrat Philip A. Walter. He was elected back to the Assembly in 1919 and sat in the Assembly again in 1920. He ran for the Assembly in 1925, losing the election to the Democratic incumbent John H. Conroy.

Bourke was president of the Riverside Republican Club of the Ninth District, the New York Archdiocesan Union of the Catholic Young Men's Societies, and the Spalding Literary Union. He also held a number of offices with the Royal Arcanum. He was a member of the New York Catholic Club, the New York County Lawyers' Association, the Knights of Columbus, and the Freemasons.

Bourke died at home from heart disease following a month-long illness on April 8, 1939.

New York State Assembly
Preceded by Mark Eisner	New York State Assembly; New York County, 17th District; 1915	Succeeded by Vincent Gilroy
Preceded by Vincent Gilroy	New York State Assembly; New York County, 17th District; 1917	Succeeded by August Claessens
Preceded by Charles D. Donohue	New York State Assembly; New York County, 9th District; 1918	Succeeded by Philip A. Walter
Preceded by Philip A. Walter	New York State Assembly; New York County, 9th District; 1920	Succeeded by Edward R. Rayher
