= Pat Bourke (footballer, born 1894) =

Australian rules footballer

Personal information
- Full name: Pat Bourke
- Born: 18 November 1894
- Died: 15 September 1982 (aged 87)
- Original team: Ballarat

Playing career^{1}
Years	Club	Games (Goals)
1921–22	Melbourne	19 (6)
- ^{1} Playing statistics correct to the end of 1922.

Pat Bourke (18 November 1894 – 15 September 1982) was an Australian rules footballer who played with Melbourne in the Victorian Football League (VFL).
