= Bill Bourke (footballer, born 1927) =

Australian rules footballer

Personal information
- Full name: William Joseph Bourke
- Born: 7 February 1927
- Died: 4 June 2002 (aged 75)
- Height: 179 cm (5 ft 10 in)
- Weight: 74 kg (163 lb)

Playing career^{1}
Years	Club	Games (Goals)
1951	North Melbourne	5 (0)
- ^{1} Playing statistics correct to the end of 1951.

William Joseph Bourke (7 February 1927 – 4 June 2002) was an Australian rules footballer who played with the North Melbourne Football Club in the Victorian Football League (VFL).
