= Thomas Bourke, 4th Baron Bourke of Connell =

Irish peer (1599)

The Right Honourable The Lord Bourke of Castleconnell
- Tomas Búrca
- Born: Thomas Bourke
- Died: 1599
- Children: Christina Bourke; Edmund Bourke
- Parent(s): Theobald Bourke; Mary O'Brien

Thomas Bourke, 4th Baron Bourke of Castleconnell (English: /bɜːrk/ BURK), was an Irish noble who held his title for only a matter of hours on 28 February 1599.

== Family ==
Bourke was the son of Theobald Bourke (died 19 August 1578), a principal commander against Lord Desmond, and his wife Mary, daughter of Donough O'Brien, Earl of Thomond, and grandson of Sir William Bourke (created Baron Bourke of Castleconnell by Elizabeth I by patent dated 16 May 1580). Thomas had been preceded as Baron Bourke of Castleconnell by his two elder brothers, John (who sat in parliament in Dublin in 1585 and was slain in battle at Hounslow, Middlesex on 14 January 1592, leaving no issue) and Richard (slain in battle by Dermot O'Connor Sligo at Ballynecargy, County Limerick on 28 February 1599, also leaving no issue).

At his death, Thomas left a daughter, Christina (wife of Sir Dominick White, Mayor of Limerick in 1636, later created Count of Alby and Marquis of Albeville in the Holy Roman Empire), and an infant son, Edmund Bourke, 5th Lord Bourke of Castleconnell. During his youth, Theobald, younger brother of Thomas, usurped the title of Baron Bourke of Castleconnell, claiming that Edmund was illegitimate. Theobald was later created Baron of Brittas in 1618, and Edmund, having established his legitimacy, continued the line of the Barons of Castleconnell.

== Arms ==
Coat of arms of Thomas Bourke, 4th Baron Bourke of Connell
Crest A Cat-a-Mountain sejant guardant proper, collared and chained Or. Escutcheon Or, a cross gules, in the first quarter a dexter hand couped at the wrist and erect sable. Supporters Two Cats-a-Mountain sejant guardant proper, collared and chained Or

== See also ==
- House of Burgh, an Anglo-Norman and Hiberno-Norman dynasty founded in 1193

Peerage of Ireland
Preceded by Richard Bourke	Baron Bourke of Castleconnell; 1599	Succeeded by Edmund Bourke
