= Richard Bourke (academic) =

Irish academic

Richard Bourke FBA
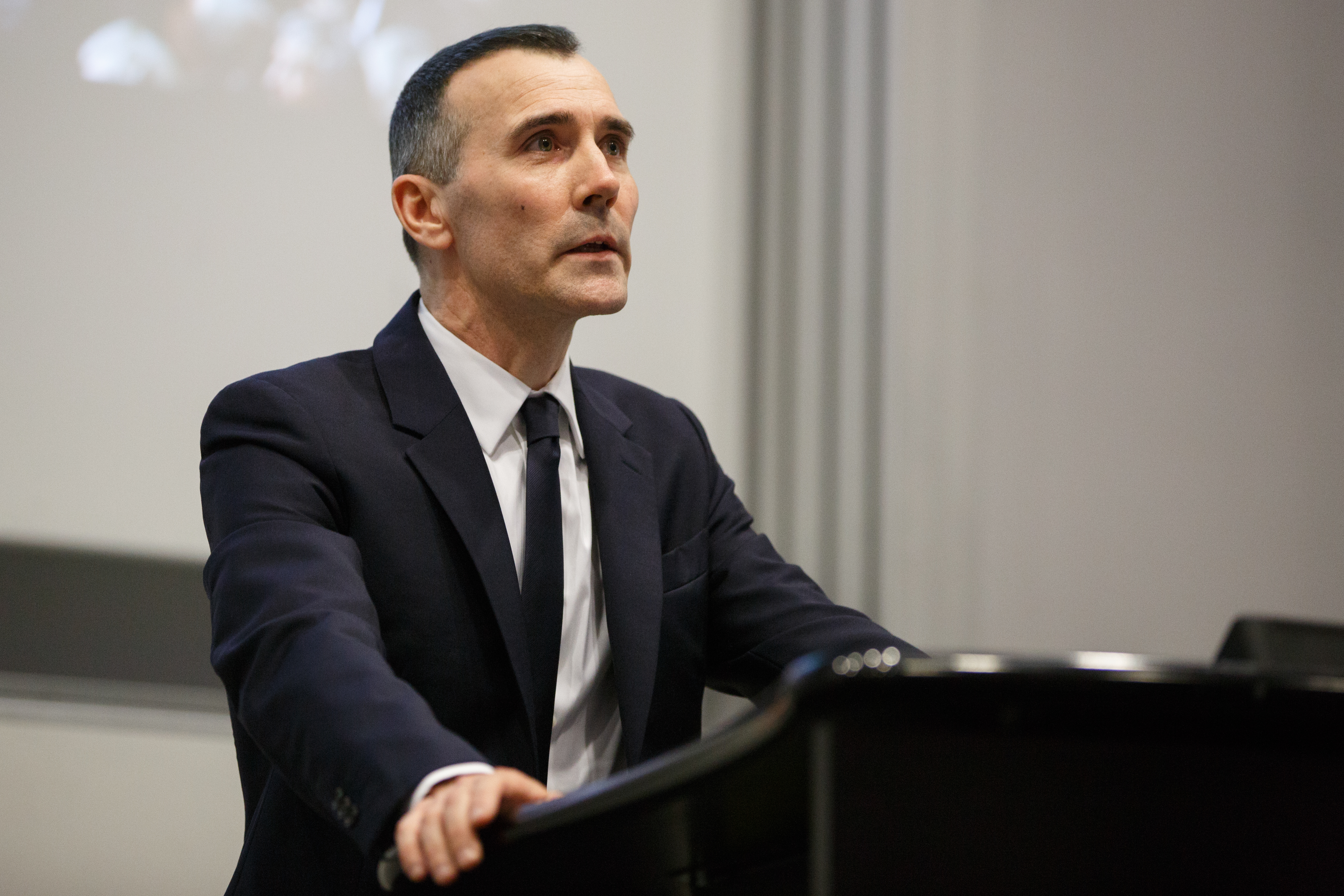
- Bourke lecturing in 2016
- Born: 1965 (age 60–61); London
- Citizenship: Irish

Academic background
- Education: St. Kilian's German School
- Alma mater: University College, Dublin (BA); St Catherine's College, Oxford; King's College, Cambridge (PhD); Birkbeck College, London (BA)

Academic work
- Discipline: History; philosophy; political science
- Institutions: King's College, Cambridge; Queen Mary, University of London
- Notable works: Romantic Discourse and Political Modernity; Peace in Ireland: The War of Ideas; Empire and Revolution: The Political Life of Edmund Burke; Hegel's World Revolutions
- Website: www.hist.cam.ac.uk/people/prof-richard-bourke

Richard Bourke FBA (born 1965) is a UK-based Irish academic specialising in the history of political ideas. His work spans ancient and modern thought, and is associated with the application of the historical method to political theory. He is Professor of the History of Political Thought at the University of Cambridge, and a Fellow of King's College, Cambridge. He was formerly Professor of the History of Political Thought and Co-Director of the Centre for the Study of the History of Political Thought at Queen Mary, University of London. In July 2018 Bourke was elected a Fellow of the British Academy (FBA).

== Life and career ==
Bourke grew up in Dublin, where he attended St. Kilian's German School. In 1986 he earned a BA in English and Philosophy at University College, Dublin. He then spent a year at St Catherine's College, Oxford, before taking up a research studentship at King's College, Cambridge, where he obtained his PhD in 1990. Bourke subsequently earned a second BA in Classics at Birkbeck College, University of London.

After a three-year lectureship in Dublin, Bourke moved to Queen Mary, University of London where, in 2012, he became Professor in the History of Political Thought and Co-Director of the Centre for the Study of the History of Political Thought. In 2018 he was elected to the Chair in the History of Political Thought at the University of Cambridge. In 2022 he was awarded an honorary degree of Doctor of Arts by University College Dublin. Bourke has held various visiting fellowships in the United States, and was a Fellow of the Wissenschaftskolleg zu Berlin in 2014–15.

Bourke has published widely on the history of political thought, including on ancient political ideas and Enlightenment intellectual history. He has also published in Irish history, particularly on the political conflict in Northern Ireland. His work has engaged with a range of issues in historiography and political theory, including Romanticism, the Enlightenment, the Ancien Régime, political judgement, sovereignty, nationalism and democracy. He is currently working on the philosophy of history and writing a history of democracy. Bourke's Empire and Revolution: The Political Life of Edmund Burke was named a book of the year by several sources in 2015, including The Observer, The Spectator, and The Irish Times. According to the Royal Historical Society, the work "revolutionised" the way Burke has been viewed. Bourke has lectured around the world, and written for a variety of journals and newspapers including The Financial Times, The Times Literary Supplement, and The Nation.

== Prizes ==
- 2017 Honourable Mention in the Association of American Publishers annual PROSE Awards for The Princeton History of Modern Ireland.
- 2016 Choice Outstanding Academic Title for The Princeton History of Modern Ireland.
- 2015 Joint Winner of the István Hont Memorial Prize in Intellectual History.
- 2016 Book of the Year for The Princeton History of Modern Ireland in The Irish Times and RTÉ/Irish Booksellers.
- 2016 Honourable Mention in the Association of American Publishers annual PROSE Awards for Empire and Revolution: The Political Life of Edmund Burke.
- 2015 Book of the Year for Empire and Revolution: The Political Life of Edmund Burke in The Observer, The Irish Times, The Spectator, The Claremont Review of Books, RTÉ, The Indian Express, The National Review.
- 2005 Sir Christopher Ewart-Biggs Memorial Prize for Peace in Ireland: The War of Ideas (Final Short-List).
- 2000 Institute of Historical Research/Weidenfeld & Nicolson History Prize for Manuscript of Peace in Ireland: The War of Ideas (Final Short-list).

== Works ==
=== Books ===
- Bourke, Richard (2023). Hegel's World Revolutions. Princeton University Press. doi:10.2307/jj.2809009. ISBN 978-0-691-25312-1.
- Empire and Revolution: The Political Life of Edmund Burke (Princeton University Press, 2015).
- Peace in Ireland: The War of Ideas (Random House, 2003; 2nd edition with new Preface, 2012).
- Romantic Discourse and Political Modernity (Simon & Schuster, Harvester: 1993).
- (ed. with Quentin Skinner), History in the Humanities and Social Sciences (Cambridge University Press, 2023).
- (ed. with Niamh Gallagher), The Political Thought of the Irish Revolution (Cambridge University Press, 2022).
- (ed. with Ian McBride), The Princeton History of Modern Ireland (Princeton University Press, 2016).
- (ed. with Quentin Skinner), Popular Sovereignty in Historical Perspective (Cambridge University Press, 2016).
- (ed. with Raymond Geuss), Political Judgement: Essays for John Dunn (Cambridge University Press, 2009).

=== Film ===
- (with Dina Gusejnova), Rosenöl und Deutscher Geist: The Fortunes of German Intellectual History.
