= Gallagher (surname) =

Gallagher is an Irish surname. It originates from the Irish noble Gallagher family of County Donegal, Ireland, meaning “descendant of the foreign helper”. The name Gallagher is an anglicization of the Irish surname Ó Gallchobhair, Ó Gallchobhoir (or two alternative spelling forms, Ó Gallchóir and Ó Gallachóir), these being masculine forms; the corresponding feminine forms are Ní Ghallchobhair (newer forms Ní Ghallchóir and Ní Ghallachóir). At least 30 recorded alternate variants exist, including O'Gallagher, Gallacher, Gallager, Gallaher, Gallocher, Galliher, Gollaher, Gollihar and Gallahue.

The earliest recorded incidence of the name is in a fragment of a manuscript currently in the Royal Library of Brussels, which states the name "Gallchubhair". A similarly earlier mention occurs in the Annals of the Four Masters, where it is recorded that Mael Cobo Úi Gallchobhar, Abbot of Scrin Adamnain, died in 1022 AD. Gallchobhar was the one given the role of founding father of the clan at the advent of widespread surname usage in Ireland, which began around the 10th century.

As with other modern Irish last names, Ó Gallchóir similarly appears to be a conjoined compound word.

Most Gallaghers are found in the Americas, where approximately 60% of Gallaghers originate. The United States is the home to 55% of Gallaghers. Gallagher is also the most common surname in County Donegal (Dún na nGall means "fort of the foreigner"), and thus is very common in Derry, and is the fourteenth-most-common by birth records in Ireland. In the United States, it was ranked by the 2020 US Census as the 482nd most common name. According to Professor Edward MacLysaght, in the mid-20th century Gallagher was one of the most common Irish surnames, most of the recorded births being located in the northern province, Ulster, and the western province, Connacht, with the majority being recorded in the homeland of the sept—County Donegal in Ulster. In 1890 it was ranked the 12th-most-common surname in Ireland, while in 1996 it was 20th.

== People with surname Gallagher ==
=== A ===
- Aidan Gallagher (born 2003), American actor
- Alexandra Gallagher, British multidisciplinary artist
- Ann Gallagher (born 1967), politician who served in Seanad Éireann
- Audrey Gallagher, trance singer

=== B ===
- Benny Gallagher, Scottish singer/songwriter and member of Gallagher and Lyle
- Bill Gallagher Sr. (1911–1990), a New Zealand inventor of the electric fence, founder of Gallagher Group (NZ)
- Bob Gallagher, several people
- Brendan Gallagher (born 1992), Canadian hockey player
- Brian O'Gallagher, Australian politician
- Bridie Gallagher (1924–2012), singer
- Bronagh Gallagher (born 1972), Irish singer and actress

=== C ===
- Cam Gallagher (born 1992), American baseball player
- Catherine Gallagher (born 1945), literary critic
- Charlie Gallagher, several people
- Colm Gallagher (died 1957), Irish politician
- Conor Gallagher (born 2000), English football player
- Conrad Gallagher (born 1971), chef and businessman from Letterkenny
- Cornelius Edward Gallagher (1921–2018), American politician
- Cynthia Gallagher, American artist

=== D ===
- Dan Gallagher (1957–2001), Canadian TV broadcaster
- David Gallagher, several people named David and Dave
- Deirdre Gallagher (born 1974), Irish race walker
- Delia Gallagher (born 1970), TV journalist
- Denis Gallagher (1922–2001), Irish politician
- Dennis J. Gallagher (1939–2022), American politician
- Dermot Gallagher (born 1957), Irish football referee

=== E ===
- Edward Gallagher, several people named Ed or Edward
- Ellen Gallagher (born 1965), American artist
- Eugene V. Gallagher (born 1950), American religious scholar

=== F ===
- Frank Gallagher, several people
- Fred Gallagher, several people

=== G ===
- Gerald Gallagher (1912–1941), medical doctor and British colonial administrator, of the Phoenix Islands Settlement Scheme
- Gerry Gallagher (born 1951), American footballer
- Gino Gallagher (c. 1963–1996), chief of staff of the militant revolutionary Irish National Liberation Army

=== H ===
- Helen Gallagher (1926–2024), American actress
- Helen Gallagher Solomon (died 1943), Ziegfeld girl who co-founded Gallagher's Steak House
- Harry Gallagher (1880–1975), Irish businessman and founder of Urney Chocolates
- Hugh Gallagher, several people

=== J ===
- Jack Gallagher, several people
- Jackie Gallagher, male English footballer
- James Gallagher, several people
- Jared Gallagher (born 2002), Singaporean football player
- Jill Gallagher, Australian aboriginal worker
- Jim Gallagher, several people
- Jimmy Gallagher (1901–1971), Scottish-American soccer player
- Joe Gallagher (baseball) (1914–1998), American baseball player
- Joe Gallagher (boxing) (born 1968)
- Joe Gallagher (footballer) (born 1955)
- John Gallagher, several people
- Jon Gallagher (born 1996), Irish football player
- Joseph Gallagher (born 1964), Chess opening strategy theorist and one of six living Swiss chess grandmasters

=== K ===
- Kathryn Gallagher (born 1993), American singer and actress
- Katie Gallagher (1986–2022), fashion designer
- Katie Gallagher (born 1971), penname of Sarah Addison Allen
- Katy Gallagher (born 1970), Chief Minister of the Australian Capital Territory
- Kelly Sims Gallagher, American international affairs scholar
- Kenna Gallagher (1917–2011), British Foreign Office official and diplomat
- Kerri Gallagher (born 1989), American middle-distance runner
- Kevin R. Gallagher, American guitarist
- Kim Gallagher (1964–2002), American track and field Olympian

=== L ===
- Leo Anthony Gallagher Jr., better known under his stage name Gallagher (1946–2022), American comedian
- Leo Gallagher (1887–1963), American leftist lawyer and political candidate
- Liam Gallagher (born 1972), lead singer of the British band Oasis and formerly of Beady Eye
- Louis J. Gallagher (1885–1972), American Jesuit, educator, writer and translator

=== M ===
- Maggie Gallagher (born 1960), American commentator
- Mark Gallagher, guitarist of the British heavy metal band Raven
- Matt Gallagher, several people
- Megan Gallagher (born 1960), American actress
- Martin Gallagher (born 1952), New Zealand politician
- Mary Gallagher, American playwright, screenwriter, and novelist
- Michael Gallagher, several people named Michael or Mike, most notably political scientist Michael Gallagher (academic), creator of the Gallagher index
- Mick Gallagher (born 1945), musician with Ian Dury and the Blockheads

=== N ===
- Neil Gallagher, several people
- Noel Gallagher (born 1967), lead guitarist and backup singer of Oasis and currently with Noel Gallagher's High Flying Birds
- Norm Gallagher (1931–1999), Australian trade unionist

=== P ===
- PJ Gallagher, several people
- Pat Gallagher, several people named Pat or Patricia
- Patrick Gallagher, several people named Paddy or Patrick
- Paul Gallagher, several people
- Peta Gallagher (born 1977), Australian field hockey player
- Peter Gallagher, several people

=== R ===
- Raymond F. Gallagher (born 1939), New York state senator
- Richard B. Gallagher, Scottish academic publisher
- Richard F. Gallagher (1909–1995), American college basketball coach
- Richard "Skeets" Gallagher (1891–1955)
- Robert Gallagher, magazine photographer
- Rory Gallagher (1948–1995), Irish blues guitarist and singer

=== S ===
- Sean Gallagher, several people
- Shane Gallagher (born 1973), guitarist with bands +44 and Mercy Killers
- Shaun Gallagher, American philosopher
- Stephen Gallagher (born 1954), British author and screenwriter
- Steve Gallagher, former drummer for the band Tally Hall

=== T ===
- Teresa Gallagher, British actress
- Tess Gallagher (born 1943), American author
- Thomas Gallagher, several people named Thomas, Tom and Tommy
- Tim Gallagher, American ornithologist
- Tony Gallagher (businessman) (born 1951), British billionaire property developer
- Trace Gallagher (born 1961), Fox News anchor
- Ty Gallagher (born 2003), American ice hockey player
- Tysie Gallagher (born 1998), English professional boxer

=== W ===
- Wes Gallagher (1921–1997), American journalist and general manager of the Associated Press
- William Gallagher, several people

== Fictional characters ==
- Robin Gallagher, fictional Desperate Housewives character, played by Julie Benz
- Gallagher family (Shameless)
- Mary Katherine Gallagher, fictional Saturday Night Live character

== See also ==
- Gallagher family, the ancestral Irish clan
