= Gallagher =

Gallagher may refer to:

== Places ==
=== United States ===
- Gallagher Township, Pennsylvania
- Gallagher, West Virginia, an unincorporated place

== People ==
- Gallagher (surname)
- Gallagher (comedian), stage name of Leo Anthony Gallagher Jr.
- Gallagher family, Irish clan

== Other ==
- Arthur J. Gallagher & Co., American insurance brokerage
- The Gallagher Index, in political science
- The Gallagher Group (UK), construction and quarrying firm
- "Gallagher" (Space Ghost Coast to Coast), a television episode

== See also ==
- Gallager (disambiguation)
- Gallaher (disambiguation)
- Gallacher
- Goligher
- Justice Gallagher (disambiguation)
