= Michael Gallagher =

Michael or Mike Gallagher may refer to:

== Politics ==
- Michael Gallagher (academic) (born 1951), British political scientist at Trinity College, Dublin, inventor of the Gallagher Index
- Michael Gallagher (British politician) (1934–2015), British MEP 1979–1984
- Michael Gallagher (political advisor) (born 1964), American presidential adviser and president and CEO of the Entertainment Software Association
- Mike Gallacher (born 1961), Australian politician
- Mike Gallagher (American politician) (born 1984), Member of U.S. House of Representatives from Wisconsin's 8th congressional district
- Mike Gallagher (political commentator) (born 1960), American radio host and conservative political commentator

== Sports ==
- Michael Gallagher (Australian footballer) (born 1966), Australian rules footballer
- Michael Gallagher (cyclist) (born 1978), Australian Paralympic cyclist
- Mike Gallagher (footballer) (died 1984), Irish association football player (Hibernian FC)
- Mike Gallagher (skier) (1941–2013), American cross-country skier

== Arts and media ==
- Michael Gallagher (filmmaker) (born 1988), American filmmaker
- Michael Gallagher (guitarist) (fl. 1994–2010), ex-guitarist of the American band Isis
- Michael Gallagher (journalist) (born 1958), American journalist
- Michael Gallagher (postman and prognosticator) (fl. 2007–2015), Irish amateur weather forecaster
- Michael Gallagher (translator) (born 1930), American translator of Japanese literature
- Michael Gallagher (writer) (born 1951), American comic book and satire writer
- Michael B. Gallagher (born 1945), American painter
- Michael J. Gallagher (artist), American artist
- Mick Gallagher (born 1945), British keyboardist
- Michael J. Gallagher, writer/director of the 2016 film The Thinning

== Others ==
- Michael Gallagher (bishop) (1866–1937), American bishop
- Michael C. Gallagher (1943–2023), American academic administrator
- Michael R. Gallagher (retired 2004), American chief executive
- Michael Gallagher, played by Paul Newman in the 1981 American drama Absence of Malice
- Michael Gallagher, Scottish man involved in the Heathrow mortar attacks

== See also ==
- Gallagher (surname), a surname (including a list of people with the name)
