= Gallaher =

Gallaher may refer to:

- Gallaher (surname)
- Gallaher Group, a British-based multinational tobacco company

== See also ==
- Dave Gallaher Trophy
- Gallacher
- Gallager (disambiguation)
- Gallagher (disambiguation)
