= John Gallacher =

John Gallacher may refer to:

- John Gallacher, Baron Gallacher (1920–2004), British co-operative official and politician
- John Gallacher (footballer, born 1951), Scottish football player
- John Gallacher (footballer, born 1969), Scottish football player

== See also ==
- John Gallagher (disambiguation)
