= Charles Kegel =

President of Idaho State University

Charles H. Kegel (August 16, 1924 – April 14, 1981) was a professor in the Department of Communication Skills at Michigan State University and in the Department of English at Idaho State University. He served as editor of the Rocky Mountain Review of Language and Literature in 1959 and as acting President of Idaho State University from 1975 to 1976.

Academic offices
| Preceded by William E. Davis | President of Idaho State University; 1975–1976 | Succeeded by Myron L. Coulter |
