= Mícheál Ó Cléirigh Summer School =

Historical conference in County Donegal

The Mícheál Ó Cléirigh Summer School is an annual historical and cultural programme held in County Donegal, Ireland, devoted to the life and scholarship of the Franciscan historian Mícheál Ó Cléirigh (c.1590–1643), principal compiler of the Annals of the Four Masters. The programme typically features lectures and discussions on Gaelic scholarship, the Franciscan intellectual tradition, and the historical context of the compilation of the Annals of the Four Masters.

== Historical context ==
Modern scholarship associates the work of Mícheál Ó Cléirigh with the Franciscan refuge of the Donegal friars at Bundrowes in Bundoran, which operated following the destruction of Donegal Abbey in 1601. Documentary evidence for this refuge appears in the Louvain Papers (1606–1827), edited by Brendan Jennings and Cathaldus Giblin. One entry records funds sent to the Irish Franciscans in Louvain and includes the line: “From Bundrowis, 20 s.” The same collection also identifies “Bundrowes, Fran. friary,” confirming the presence of a Franciscan house at the site. The Franciscan refuge at Bundrowes and its connection with the work of Mícheál Ó Cléirigh has been discussed in the scholarship of several historians, including Paul Walsh, Brendan Jennings, Paddy Gallagher, Bernadette Cunningham, and Nollaig Ó Muraíle, in studies concerning the compilation of the Annals of the Four Masters and the wider intellectual tradition of the Franciscan Order in early modern Ireland.

Ó Cléirigh himself recorded in manuscript colophons that he was working “at Drowes in the Convent of the Friars of Donegal,” a historical reference to the Franciscan refuge at Bundrowes. These colophon references correspond with the documentary evidence for a Franciscan friary at Bundrowes recorded in the Louvain Papers.

Institutional scholarship has also associated the compilation of the Annals of the Four Masters with the Bundrowes friary. An exhibition on the manuscripts organised jointly by Trinity College Dublin, University College Dublin, the Royal Irish Academy and the Franciscan Order notes that the annals project was created at the friary in 1632, where the compilers carried out their work with the support of the local Franciscan community.

Modern reporting has also highlighted documentary references and archaeological evidence relating to the Bundrowes friary site in Magheracar, Bundoran and to the historical presence of the Ó Cléirigh family in the Bundoran area.

As of 2026, the official website of the Mícheál Ó Cléirigh Summer School does not reference the Bundrowes friary in Bundoran or the documentary record preserved in the Louvain Papers.

== See also ==
- Mícheál Ó Cléirigh
- Annals of the Four Masters
- Bundoran
- Franciscan Order
- Donegal Abbey
- County Donegal
