= Thomas Gallagher =

Thomas Gallagher may refer to:

== Politics ==
- Thomas Gallagher (Illinois politician) (1850–1930), U.S. Representative from Illinois
- Thomas Gallagher (Pittsburgh Mayor) (1883–1967), mayor of Pittsburgh
- Tom Gallagher (born 1944), Florida politician
- Tom Gallagher (Massachusetts politician), member of the Massachusetts House of Representatives
- Tommy Gallagher (politician) (1942–2025), Irish nationalist

== Other ==
- Thomas C. Gallagher, chief executive officer of the Genuine Parts Company
- Thomas F. Gallagher (1897–1985), Minnesota Supreme Court judge, 1943–1967
- Thomas Gerard Gallagher (born 1954), British professor
- Tommy Gallagher (rugby league) (born 1983), rugby league player for Leigh Centurions
- Tommy Gallagher (trainer), boxing trainer seen on TV show The Contender
- Tom Gallagher (diplomat) (1940–2018), American diplomat
- Thomas Gallagher (swimmer) (born 1999), Australian Paralympic swimmer
- Thomas Gallagher (writer) (1918–1992), American writer

== See also ==
- Tom Gallacher (1932–2001), Scottish playwright
