= Anti-statism =

Opposition to state intervention

Anti-statism is an approach to social, economic or political philosophy that opposes the influence of the state over society. It emerged in reaction to the formation of modern sovereign states, which anti-statists consider to work against the interests of the people.

During the 19th century, anarchists formulated a critique of the state that upheld the inherently cooperative and decentralised aspects of human society. In the 20th century, anti-state neoliberals sought to cut state investment in the public sector and expand investment in the private sector. Other anti-state social movements sought to overthrow states through guerrilla warfare or limit states by establishing autonomous local institutions.

== Background ==
The modern conception of the sovereign state emerged in the wake of the Peace of Westphalia, which defined the rights, obligations and boundaries of states, replacing the old system of feudalism. The consolidation of these new European states was supported by the concurrent rise of colonialism and mercantile capitalism, which built an economic base for sovereign states to establish a monopoly on violence and organise a bureaucracy. Anti-statist tendencies were constituted to critique and oppose the modern bureaucratic state, which anti-statism considers to be inherently tyrannical and to act against individual liberty.

== Development ==
A formalised opposition to the modern sovereign state began to emerge during the 19th century, as various political tendencies started arguing that states worked in counter to people's "natural tendency" towards decentralisation. These anti-statists argued that centralisation promoted state interests and subordinated popular interests, and considered the main motivation of states to be territorial expansion, which they believed would inevitably result in inter-state war. Among the first to formalize a complete theory of anti-statism were Karl Marx and Friedrich Engels, who in their work The Communist Manifesto, written during the Revolutions of 1848, argued that the capitalist state operated against the interests of the working class and called for a revolution to overthrow existing states and establish a free association of producers in their place.

One branch of anti-statism soon developed into the political philosophy of anarchism, which through the works of Peter Kropotkin and Elisée Reclus, constituted a naturalist argument against the state. Kropotkin theorised that human evolution had been driven by a process of mutual aid and that humanity's natural tendency towards cooperation had thus influenced its sociocultural evolution. Kropotkin believed that capitalism and statism acted against human society's natural tendency towards cooperation and decentralisation, and viewed the territorial expansionism of modern states, including that of the Russian Soviet Republic, as antithetical to human geography. Reclus likewise criticised state borders as inherently "artificial" as they did not tend to corresponded with natural regions, and saw violent conflict as an inevitable consequence of a state's territorial expansionism, which he criticised as pitting humanity against nature.

In the 20th century, anti-statism evolved in two directions, one that sought to "hollow out the state" and another that sought to create a movement to overthrow the state. The former tendency coagulated into neoliberalism, which aimed to undo Keynesian reforms by cutting state investment in public infrastructure and welfare and instituting deregulation, rather than abolishing the state entirely. Neoliberals tend to advocate for laissez-faire economics, preferring to invest in the private sector rather than the public sector, as they think the former will provide a greater benefit to society than the latter.

In contrast, anti-statist social movements can seek to either limit or eliminate the influence of the state, either through violent or non-violent means. Some carry out guerrilla warfare against the state, while others attempt to establish a form of autonomy from the state or decentralise power to local institutions. In many cases, these social movements emerged in reaction against the policies of neoliberalism, as fewer people felt invested in a state that was increasingly divesting from the public sector.

== See also ==
- Anti-politics
- Anti-system politics
- Opposition to state nationalism

== Bibliography ==
- Cudworth, Erika (2007). "Anarchism: the Politics of Anti-Statism". In Cudworth, Erika; Hall, Timothy; McGovern, John (eds.). The Modern State: Theories and Ideologies. Edinburgh University Press. pp. 137–158. doi:10.1515/9780748629565-008. ISBN 978-0-7486-2176-7.
- Gallaher, Carolyn (2009). "Anti-Statism". In Gallaher, Carolyn; Dahlman, Carl T.; Gilmartin, Mary; Mountz, Alison; Shirlow, Peter (eds.). Key Concepts in Political Geography. SAGE. pp. 260–271. ISBN 978-1-4129-4672-8.
