= Neil Gallagher =

Neil Gallagher may refer to:

- Neil Gallagher (Donegal footballer) (born 1982/3), All-Ireland winner and captain of the 2007 National Football League champions
- Neil Gallagher (Louth footballer) (born 1985), Irish sportsman
- Neil Gallagher (American politician) (1921–2018), New Jersey congressman (1959–1973)

== See also ==
- Neily Gallagher, Irish sportsman
- Gallagher (disambiguation)
