= Gallager =

Gallager may refer to:

- Gallager carbine, rifle used in the American Civil War
- Robert G. Gallager, information theorist

== See also ==
- Gallagher (disambiguation)
- Gallaher (disambiguation)
- Gallacher
