= Gallaher (surname) =

Gallaher is a surname. Notable people with the surname include:

- Carolyn Gallaher, American academic
- Dave Gallaher, Irish-born New Zealand rugby union footballer
- David Gallaher, American video game writer
- Donald Gallaher, American actor
- Eddie Gallaher, American radio personality
- John Gallaher (born 1965), American poet and educator
- John S. Gallaher (1796–1877), American politician and newspaperman from Virginia
- Louisa Bernie Gallaher, American scientific photographer
- Simon Gallaher, Australian singer and pianist
- John Gallaher, American poet
- Patrick Gallaher, Irish ventriloquist
- Michael D. Gallaher, American business executive
