= Kevin Satterlee =

American lawyer and academic administrator

13th President of Idaho State University
- In office July 11th, 2018 – January 29th, 2024
- Preceded by: Arthur C. Vailas
- Succeeded by: Robert W. Wagner

Personal details
- Born: Kevin D. Satterlee; May 4, 1968 (age 57) Priest River, Idaho, U.S.
- Education: Boise State University (BA); University of Idaho (JD)

Kevin Satterlee is an American attorney and academic administrator who served as the 13th president of Idaho State University.

== Early life and education ==
Satterlee was born in Priest River, Idaho, on March 4, 1968. He earned a Bachelor of Arts degree in political science from Boise State University and Juris Doctor from the University of Idaho College of Law. Satterlee joined the Idaho State Bar in 1993.

== Career ==
After graduating from law school, Satterlee began his career as a private practice attorney before joining the Idaho Attorney General's office. Satterlee became the lead attorney for the Idaho State Board of Education, and eventually served as a deputy Idaho attorney general for six years.

Prior to taking office as president of Idaho State University, Satterlee served in several positions at Boise State University, including chief operating officer, vice president, and special counsel to the university's president.
