= Walter Noel Hartley =

English chemist

Sir Walter Noel Hartley FRS FRSE DSc (1845-11 September 1913) was an English chemist. He was a pioneer of spectroscopy, and the first person to establish a relationship between the wavelengths of spectral lines of the elements and their positions in the periodic table (published in 1883), and he studied also the relationship between the structure and spectra of a wide variety of organic compounds. In 1881, he hypothesized the presence of ozone in the atmosphere.

== Life ==
He was born in Lichfield in Staffordshire on 3 February 1847, the son of Thomas Hartley a portrait painter and his wife, Caroline Lockwood. He studied Science at Edinburgh University and Marburg in Germany. He married Mary Laffan in 1882 and they had one son John who was killed in the First World War.

From 1871 to 1879 he lectured in chemistry at King's College London. He was then given a professorship at the Royal College of Science in Dublin, remaining in this role until retiring in 1911.

In 1877 he was elected a Fellow of the Royal Society of Edinburgh. His proposers were Alexander Crum Brown, Sir James Dewar, John Hutton Balfour, and Sir William Turner. His work also led to his election to Fellowship of the Royal Society in 1884, and he was awarded an honorary doctorate (D.Sc.) by the Royal University of Ireland in October 1901.

He was knighted in 1911, following retiral.

He died in Braemar on 11 September 1913.

== Works ==
His published works included: 'Air and its Relations to Life' (1876), 'Water, Air and Disinfectants' (1877) and 'Quantitative Analysis' (1887). He was awarded a gold medal at the 1904 St Louis Exposition, for scientific applications of photography and a silver medal in chemical arts. In 1906 he gained the Longstaff Medal of the Chemical Society for researches in spectro-chemistry, and in 1908, the Grand Prix for spectrographic research at the Franco-British Exhibition. He was president of Section B (Chemistry) of the British Association, 1903–04.

== Family ==
Hartley married novelist Mary Laffan (1849–1916) in 1882.

He was survived by one son, Walter John Hartley, who died whilst serving in the British Army during the First World War at Gallipoli in 1915.
