= Fannie Gallaher =

Irish writer, novelist and teacher

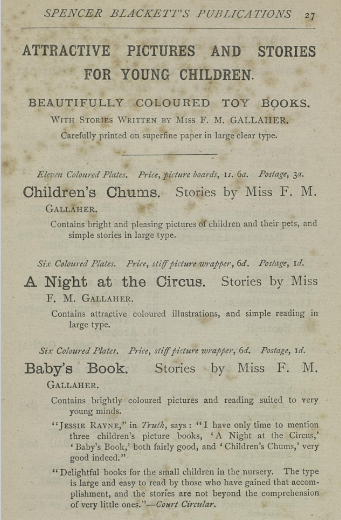
- Advert for F. M. Gallaher's books for children in 1889
- Born: Francesca Mary Gallaher; 30 May 1854; Cork, Ireland
- Died: 22 December 1935 (aged 81); Ditchling, Sussex, England
- Other names: Sydney Starr and F. M. Gallaher
- Education: Alexandra College
- Occupations: writer, novelist and teacher
- Employer(s): Alexandra College and Adeline Marie Russell, Duchess of Bedford
- Notable work: Katty the Flash: a mould of Dublin mud (1880)
- Relatives: Patrick Gallaher (grandfather)

Francesca (Fannie) Mary Gallaher a.k.a. Sydney Starr and F. M. Gallaher (30 May 1854 – 22 December 1935) was an Irish writer, novelist and teacher.

== Early life ==
Gallaher was born in Cork in 1854, but the family soon moved to Dublin where she grew up. Her parents were Sarah Gallaher (née Russell) and John Blake Gallaher, who was the editor of the Freeman's Journal for nearly thirty years. Her grandfather was ventriloquist Patrick Gallaher. She had two brothers, Fred (b1853) and Joseph (b1855) both of whom were journalists on the Freeman's Journal, with Joseph being its editor. Joseph Gallaher had two sons, Gerald (b1889) and Brendan (b1891) who were childhood contemporaries and neighbours of James Joyce.

== Career ==
=== Teaching ===
Gallaher attended Alexandra College, Dublin, and she after graduating was employed there as a teacher.

=== Writing ===
Gallaher was also a writer. In 1880 her novel Katty the Flash: a mould of Dublin mud, centred on an impoverished woman who has a non-marital baby, was published. The same year her publishers also released A Son of Man under the pseudonym of Sydney Starr.

Katty the Flash was successful and it was republished in the New York Sun and the Temple Bar magazine. Temple Bar attributed it to "Miss Gallaher", but the New York Sun was criticised by the Weekly Irish Times for allowing it to be amended and published under the name of her rival May Laffan Hartley. Gallaher's letter of protest to the plagiarism and unwelcome changes to her story were published in 1883. The confusion continued with a modern index still attributing Gallaher's story to Hartley. Later critics have noted the stories "urban realism" whilst representing women as significant figures who are either good or bad.

Gallaher also wrote stories for children that were published in the 1880s. She wrote books on the teaching of domestic science that were used in schools in Northern Ireland and were considered essential for new families by The Dublin Journal of Medical Science.

== Personal secretary ==
In 1884 she was employed as personal private secretary to Adeline Marie Russell. Duchess of Bedford and a campaigner for penal reform. Gallaher continued in this job until 1920 when Russell died and left her with an annuity of £400 per year.

== Death and legacy ==
Fannie Gallaher died at St. Georges Retreat, nursing home in Ditchling, Sussex on 22 December 1935. Fannie's funeral service took place at the Church of Our Lady, Chesham Bois, Buckinghamshire. She was interred in the churchyard at nearby Chenies, next to Adeline, Duchess of Bedford, her employer of thirty-one years.

An anthology notes that Gallaher and Laffan's works described Irish urban settings in a new way that was continued by James Joyce and James Stephens.
