= Bob Gallagher =

Bob Gallagher may refer to:

- Bob Gallagher (baseball) (born 1948), former outfielder in Major League Baseball
- Bob Gallagher (sportscaster), American sportscaster and radio host

== See also ==
- Robert Gallagher (born 1969), English commercial and editorial photographer
- Robert G. Gallager (born 1931), American electrical engineer
