= Ed Gallagher =

Ed, Eddie, Edmon, Edwin or Edward Gallagher may refer to:

- Ed Gallagher (actor) (1873–1929), American vaudeville actor
- Ed Gallagher (American football, born 1903) (1903–1963), also known as Edward B. Gallagher, American football player
- Ed Gallagher (American football, born 1957) (1957–2005), also known as Edwin B. Gallagher, American college football player
- Ed Gallagher (baseball) (1910–1981), Major League Baseball player for the Boston Red Sox in the 1932 season
- Ed Gallagher (scientist) (born 1944), British scientist
- Eddie Gallagher (footballer) (born 1964), Scottish footballer
- Eddie Gallagher (Navy SEAL) (born 1979), US Navy SEAL
- Edmon L. Gallagher (born 1979), American professor of Christian scripture
- Edward Gallagher (politician) (1829–1895), New York state legislator
- Edward C. Gallagher (1887–1940), American wrestling coach at Oklahoma State University
