= Arthur C. Vailas =

American scientist and academic administrator

12th President of Idaho State University
- In office July 1, 2006 – June 17, 2018
- Preceded by: Richard L. Bowen
- Succeeded by: Kevin Satterlee

Personal details
- Born: January 9, 1951 (age 75) Manchester, New Hampshire, U.S.
- Education: University of New Hampshire (BS); University of Iowa (PhD)

Arthur C. Vailas (born 1951) is an American scientist and academic administrator who served as the 12th president of Idaho State University, from July 2006 to June 2018.

== Early life ==
The son of Greek immigrants, Vailas was born in Manchester, New Hampshire. He attended the University of New Hampshire on a football scholarship and graduated in 1973 with a Bachelor of Science degree.

Arthur Vailas received his Ph.D. in Physical Education from the University of Iowa in 1979, with emphasis on exercise and connective tissue physiology.

== Career ==
After completing a three-year National Science Foundation postdoctoral fellowship in orthopedic surgery and biochemistry at the University of Iowa College of Medicine, he joined the faculty of the University of California, Los Angeles. As an assistant professor in the Department of Physiological Science at UCLA, his research focused primarily on connective tissue physiology. Vailas was promoted to associate professor in 1988. He relocated to the University of Wisconsin–Madison where he was also director of the Biomechanics Laboratory. He later was promoted to professor and was granted joint appointments as professor of surgery at the University of Wisconsin–Madison College of Agricultural and Life Sciences. He served as chair of the Department of Physical Education and later served as Associate Dean for Research and Development of the College of Education. In 1992 and 1995, he received Outstanding Science Achievement Awards from NASA for his work on the U.S.-Russian Space Program.

In 1996, Vailas relocated to the University of Houston as vice provost for graduate studies, and professor and distinguished chair in biology and biochemistry. He also held a joint appointment as professor of mechanical engineering. He later became vice president for research for the University of Houston and vice chancellor for research and intellectual property management for the UH System.

Vailas became president of Idaho State University July 1, 2006. He worked to establish the Center for Advanced Energy Studies, a collaboration with the Idaho National Laboratories and other Idaho universities, in 2007. In 2009, Idaho State University opened a new campus in Meridian, Idaho, which serves health professional programs.

In 2011, Vailas created the Career Path Internship (CPI), a $1.4 million program which provides students with the opportunity to apply for work in paid campus positions that match their academic and career interests. The program enables more than 200 students to work with area businesses and faculty in a real work experience environment. A recent survey of participants reveals 91% of students felt the program will enhance future employment opportunities.

Under Vailas, ISU worked with state government on the Idaho Global Entrepreneurial Mission, a program that allows faculty from Idaho universities to work with the Idaho National Laboratory to commercialize research. During his tenure, Vailas faced several "No Confidence" votes.

Vailas retired as president on June 17, 2018.

Vailas has served on scientific panels and boards for NASA and the National Institutes of Health. He was appointed to the Texas Council on Environmental Technology and received a congressional appointment to the Board of the Mickey Leland Air Toxics Center. He served as a Commissioner for Idaho in the Western Interstate Commission for Higher Education, and serves on the Idaho Governor's Council on Science and Technology. Vailas has been a consultant to numerous national health care-related businesses and institutions.

Academic offices
Preceded by Michael C. Gallagher (interim)	President of Idaho State University; 2006–2018	Succeeded by Kevin Satterlee
