= Clifford Trump =

Interim President of Idaho State University

Clifford M. Trump (born March 25, 1937) served as interim President of Idaho State University from 1984–1985.

Academic offices
Preceded by Myron L. Coulter	President of Idaho State University; 1984–1985	Succeeded by Richard L. Bowen
