= May Laffan =

Irish realist writer

Lady Mary Hartley
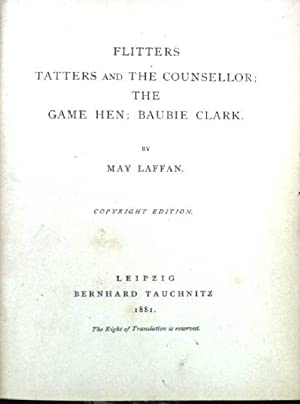
- "Flitters Tatters and the Counsellor The Game Hen, Baubie Clark"
- Born: 3 May 1849; Dublin, Ireland
- Died: 23 June 1916; Dublin, Ireland
- Occupation: Writer
- Writing career
- Pen name: Mary Laffan, May Laffan
- Genre: slum fiction

May Hartley (née Laffan) (3 May 1849 – 23 June 1916) was an Irish realist writer who wrote about Dublin society in the nineteenth century and was considered a pioneer of "slum fiction" in an Irish setting.

== Career ==
Born on 3 May 1849 to Michael Laffan and Ellen Saran Fitzgibbon in Dublin, Hartley was educated in the Dominican Convent of Sion Hill and Alexandra College. She had an older brother, William, two younger brothers, Michael and James, as well as two younger sisters, Ellen Sarah and Catherine. After school Hartley worked with Fr. Meehan as a social worker in the Liberties. She also began writing with articles such as 'Convent Boarding Schools for Young Ladies' submitted to Fraser's Magazine (June 1874).

She began writing novels but her early work was poorly received and she had a breakdown. However she continued to write and publish novels. She was also active in the Society for Prevention of Cruelty to Children.

In 1880 Fannie Gallaher published her early novel Katty the flash: a mould of Dublin mud. It was published under the pseudonym of Sydney Starr. Katty the Flash was successful and it was republished in the New York Sun who attributed their heavily amended story to Laffan.

Gallaher's letter of protest about the plagiarism and the unwelcome changes to her story was published in 1883. The New York Sun's editor was criticised by the Weekly Irish Times. The confusion continued with a modern index still attributing Gallaher's story to Hartley.

In 1882 she married Walter Noel Hartley who was a chemistry professor at King's College, London and Fellow of the Royal Society. During her marriage she was no longer writing very much. Her issues with mental health continued and in 1910 Hartley was admitted to Bloomfield Hospital. Her husband was knighted in 1911 and died suddenly in 1913. They had one son, Walter John Hartley. Born 25 April 1889, he was killed in Gallipoli, a captain in the Royal Irish Fusiliers, 16 August 1915.

== Death and legacy ==
Lady Mary Hartley died in hospital in 1916. An anthology notes that Laffan (and Gallaher)'s works described Irish urban settings in a way that was continued by James Joyce and James Stephens.

== Bibliography ==
- Hogan, M.P. (London: Macmillan 1876)
- The Hon. Miss Ferrard (1877; 2nd edn. London: Macmillan 1881)
- The Game Hen Flitters, Tatters, and the Counsellor: Three Waifs from the Dublin Streets (1879; 2nd edn. London: Simpkin & Marshall 1883)
- A Singer's Story (1885)
- Ismay's Children (1887)
- Christy Carew (1880; London: Macmillan 1882)
