= Dumbarton People's Theatre =

Dumbarton People's Theatre (often abbreviated to DPT) is an amateur theatre group which exists in the town of Dumbarton in Scotland.

It was formed in 1945. Since then they have normally performed four plays a year. This usually includes a Christmas pantomime, which club members write themselves, and is normally set in the town of "Drumtartan".

Writers who have been involved with the group include Tom Gallacher and Dave Watson.
