= Richard L. Bowen =

American university president

Richard Lee Bowen (born August 31, 1933) served as President of Idaho State University from 1985 to 2005. Bowen was also President of the University of South Dakota. At Idaho State Bowen is credited with helping to improve the university's financial support. Idaho State's enrollment doubled during his two decades as president.

Bowen holds a Ph.D. in political science from Harvard University. Prior to beginning his academic career Bowen served in the United States Department of State and on the staffs of Senators Francis H. Case, Karl Earl Mundt, Abraham A. Ribicoff and Jacob K. Javits.

Bowen temporarily resigned as university president in the mid-1990s but was persuaded to rescind his resignation due in part to pleas from the student body to return.

Bowen retired October 10, 2005.

Academic offices
Preceded by Edward Q. Moulton	President of University of South Dakota; 1968–1976	Succeeded by Robert Dezonia
Preceded by Clifford Trump	President of Idaho State University; 1985–2005	Succeeded by Michael C. Gallagher
