= William E. Davis =

American football coach and politician (1929–2021)

Biographical details
- Born: February 15, 1929; Wamego, Kansas, U.S.
- Died: September 24, 2021 (aged 92); Albuquerque, U.S.

Playing career
- 1950: Colorado
- Position: Halfback

Coaching career (HC unless noted)
- 1962: Colorado (interim HC)

Head coaching record
- Overall: 2–8

William Eugene "Bud" Davis (February 15, 1929 – September 24, 2021) was an American university president, Democratic politician, and football coach. He was an interim head football coach for the Colorado Buffaloes for the 1962 season. He was later the President of Idaho State University and the University of New Mexico, and Chancellor of the Oregon University System and Louisiana State University.

Davis is best known in Colorado for writing the book Glory Colorado! A history of the University of Colorado, 1858-1963, which was also his doctoral thesis and nearly 800 pages as a publication. As a sitting university president, he ran for the U.S. Senate in Idaho in 1972.

== Early career ==
Davis graduated from Loveland High School in 1947 and enrolled at the University of Colorado at Boulder (CU) to stay close to home and near his high school sweetheart, Pollyanne Peterson. As a freshman, he declared he wanted "to be the world's greatest football coach" and chose a physical education major and English minor. He was a reserve football player on the varsity team. After graduating in 1951, he remained at the University as assistant to the dean of men. He resigned the position to enlist in the U.S. Marine Corps. The spring of his senior year he married Peterson.

In 1960, Davis completed his master's degree in education administration at the Colorado State College of Education in Greeley and became CU's alumni director while working on his doctoral degree in education. After Sonny Grandelius left Colorado with NCAA sanctions, Davis was hired to be the football team's interim head coach on March 27, 1962. He had no collegiate coaching experience, just five years as a high school head coach.

The Buffaloes had just one win entering the finale at home on November 24, but pulled off an inspired 34–10 upset of heavily-favored Air Force at Folsom Field to finish at 2–8, the worst record in the program's 72-year history. The eight-month Bud Davis era at Boulder ended that day with his post-game resignation. In early 1963, Oklahoma assistant Eddie Crowder was hired on January 2, awarded a five-year contract at $15,000 per year.

=== Head coaching record ===
Year	Team	Overall	Conference	Standing
Colorado Buffaloes (Big Eight Conference) (1962)
1962	Colorado	2–8	1–6	7th
Colorado:		2–8	1–6	
Total:		2–8		

== Glory Colorado! ==
While working on his doctoral degree and coaching the football team Davis was writing his thesis. He received special permission from the doctoral thesis committee to bypass the standard format and write the historical narrative book about the history of the University of Colorado at Boulder until that point. The name was chosen because the school song of the same name, which is set to the music of "Battle Hymn of the Republic", which he felt captured the school's spirit. He acquired the bulk of information for the book from student-published and local city newspapers. It was published in 1965 by Fred Pruitt, founder of Pruitt Press Inc. and also a journalism professor, who offered to print it at no cost. The book has been called the "primary historical reference for the University". The book, no longer in print, was sold canvas-bound for $8. An index to supplement the text was later published and distributed by the Associated Alumni.

== Career ==
After receiving his doctoral degree in 1963, Davis left CU to become executive assistant to the president for student affairs at the University of Wyoming in Laramie.

In 1972, while president at Idaho State in Pocatello, Davis won the Democratic nomination for the open U.S. Senate seat in Idaho. He was defeated in the general election by Republican Congressman Jim McClure. McClure garnered 52.26% of the vote, followed by Davis with 45.52%, and a third-party candidate with 2.22%.

Davis was the President of Idaho State University (1965–1975) and University of New Mexico (1975–1982), Chancellor of the Oregon University System (1982–1989) and Louisiana State University (1989–1996).

Davis published other works, including Miracle on the Mesa / A History of the University of New Mexico, 1889–2003. He served on the board of directors for Sunrise Bank of Albuquerque starting in 2005.

== Later life ==
Davis was commissioned by CU to write Volume 2 of Glory Colorado! (ISBN 978-0870818936) in 1999. It covered the period from 1963 (the end of the first book) to 2000. Davis authored the book pro bono, writing a majority of it in the summer of 1999 while on break from Louisiana State University. It was published in 2007.

Davis died in 2021. He had been married to Pollyanne Peterson, who died in 2020; they had four daughters and one son.

== Awards and honors ==
Universities perform miracles. They change lives. The University of Colorado made it possible for me to have a life of wild adventure.

— William E. Davis
- George Norlin Award, for distinguished service (1975)
- University of Colorado Alumnus of the Century Award (1977)
- CU Athletic Hall of Honor Award (1980)
- Davis Field, named in his honor
  - Outdoor venue for track & field and soccer on the Idaho State University campus in Pocatello; formerly the "Spud Bowl" (42.859°N 112.431°W)

Academic offices
Preceded by Donald E. Walker	President of Idaho State University; 1965–1975	Succeeded by Charles Kegel
Preceded by Ferrel Heady	President of University of New Mexico; 1975–1982	Succeeded by John Perovich
Preceded by E. Grady Bogue	Chancellor of Louisiana State University; 1989–1996	Succeeded by William L. Jenkins
Party political offices
Preceded by Ralph R. Harding	Democratic Party nominee, United States Senator (Class 2) from Idaho; 1972 (lost)	Succeeded by Dwight Jensen
