= P. J. Gallagher =

P. J. Gallagher may refer to:

- P. J. Gallagher (boxer) (born 1974), British boxer
- P. J. Gallagher (comedian), Irish stand-up comedian
- P. J. Gallagher (politician), American politician in the state of Washington

== See also ==
- Gallagher (surname)
