= Adeline Marie Russell, Duchess of Bedford =

British advocate and activist (1852–1920)

Her Grace The Duchess of Bedford GBE
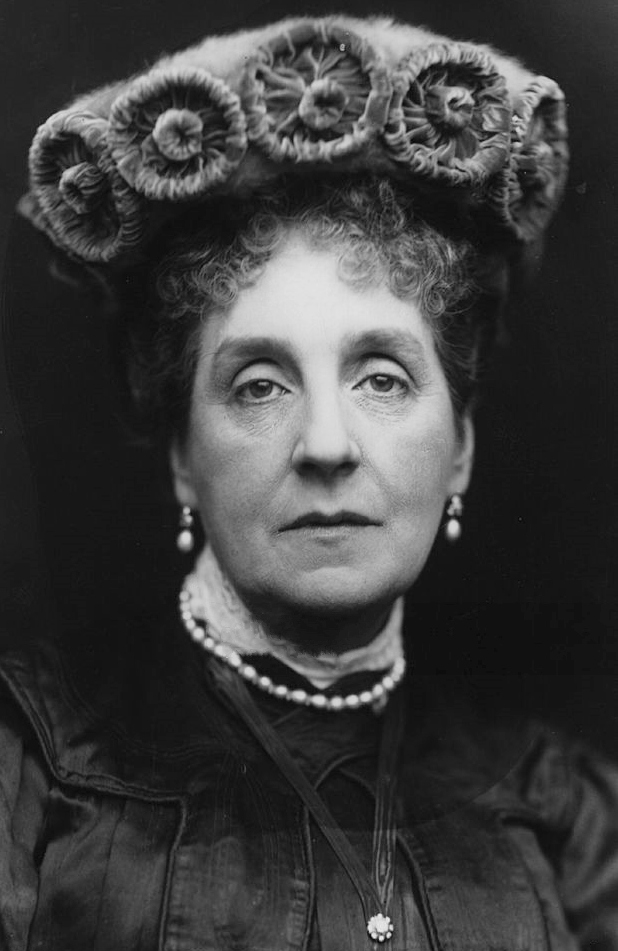
- Russell photographed in 1905 by George Charles Beresford
- Born: Hon. Adeline Marie Somers-Cocks; 24 September 1852; London, England
- Died: 12 April 1920 (aged 67); Chenies, Buckinghamshire, England
- Known for: Penal reform and chairing the European War Fund
- Spouse: George Russell, 10th Duke of Bedford (m. 1876)
- Parent(s): Charles Somers-Cocks, 3rd Earl Somers; Virginia Pattle

Adeline Marie Russell, Duchess of Bedford, GBE (née Somers-Cocks; 24 September 1852 – 12 April 1920) was a British advocate for penal reform. She led the European War Fund that cared for the wounded of the First World War.

== Life ==
Lady Adeline Marie Somers was born in 1852 to Virginia (Pattle) and Charles Somers-Cocks, Viscount Eastnor. Her grandfather died just 12 days after her birth and her father succeeded as 3rd Earl Somers. Her mother was a sister of Julia Margaret Cameron, the British Victorian photographer. Julia Stephen, Virginia Woolf's mother, was her first cousin (she was the daughter of Maria Theodosia "Mia" Jackson whose maiden name was Pattle). She was educated at home with the curriculum set by her mother.

She became Adeline Russell after she married George Sackville Russell on 24 October 1876. In 1882 Virginia Woolf was born and her mother gave her the first name of Adeline after Russell. She became the Duchess of Bedford in 1891, when George became the 10th Duke of Bedford. She a philanthropist as this kind of work was available to women. She worked with the Associated Workers' League and worked on a scheme to support poor women and prostitutes around Victoria Station in London. She employed the novelist Fannie Gallaher as her secretary in the 1880s.

For 20 years, she was visiting prisons until in 1913 she came to notice after she was shocked by a report in the papers about the mistreatment of political prisoners in Portugal. She confirmed the facts and went to Lisbon to find out more. Her reports gathered together the political parties and within a year the Portuguese had released their prisoners and Adeline was seen as the catalyst. Shortly after this war broke out.

During the first World War she was Chair of the European War Fund. The fund had been created by the Ambulance Department of the Order of St. John of Jerusalem and the Red cross. She worked tirelessly for the wounded and she made numerous visits to the Western Front to inspect conditions and to interview the wounded soldiers. She was disappointed to find that all the soldiers reported on their failure to take new ground. For this she was appointed Dame Grand Cross of the Order of the British Empire (military division) in 1919. She was appointed a Lady of Grace of the Order of the Hospital of Saint John of Jerusalem in England (L.St.J.) on 13 August 1902.

She was also noted for her role as an advocate for penal reform. After the war she continued to work for those wounded in the war and she died of heart failure in 1920 after suffering from influenza. She left a £400 annuity for her personal private secretary, Fannie Gallaher. Adeline Marie Russell had no children; she is buried in the churchyard at Chenies, Buckinghamshire.
