= William M. Laffan =

Publisher of the New York Sun

William MacKay Laffan
- Born: 22 January 1848; Dublin, Ireland
- Died: 19 November 1909 (aged 61); Lawrence, New York
- Education: Trinity College Dublin
- Occupation(s): Art critic, editor, publisher, newspaper proprietor
- Notable credit: The Sun (New York)
- Spouse: Georgiana Tompkins Radcliffe
- Relatives: May Hartley

William MacKay Laffan (22 January 1848 – 19 November 1909) was the publisher and editor of the New York Sun, and a friend, correspondent and publisher of Mark Twain.

== Biography ==
Laffan was born in Dublin and educated privately and at Trinity College Dublin. Some years after completing his education he emigrated to the United States of America.

Laffan's first job in journalism was as a reporter for the San Francisco Bulletin, where he quickly became managing editor. He went on to be editor and part-owner of the Baltimore Daily Bulletin.

In 1877 Laffan went to work for the New York Sun, then owned by Charles Anderson Dana, as a general writer, often writing art criticism. From 1881 to 1884 he was art editor for Harper & Brothers.

In 1884 he became publisher of The Sun, and in 1887 founded the Evening Sun. In 1897 Laffan, with the backing of J. P. Morgan, acquired the Morning Sun from Dana's estate, turning it into a mouthpiece for Morgan's interests. He also founded the Sun News Service (later renamed Laffan News Bureau), after a protracted conflict with the Associated Press.

In 1900 he became President of the Sun Printing and Publishing Association.

He died of appendicitis at his home in Lawrence, Nassau County, New York on 19 November 1909.

== Artistic interests ==
Laffan took a keen interest in Chinese porcelain and engraving, compiling the catalogue (2 vols, 1904–1911) of the Morgan Collection of Chinese porcelains (on display in the Metropolitan Museum until 1915), which was completed after his death by Thomas B. Clarke. He also provided a preface to Stephen W. Bushell’s catalogue of the W. T. Walters collection of Oriental ceramic art. He was a trustee of the Metropolitan Museum, and sat on the acquisitions committee.

Laffan provided the text for the volume Engravings on Wood, which showcased the work of members of the Society of American Wood Engravers.

- 1907 Catalogue of the Morgan Collection of Chinese Porcelains

== Likenesses ==
His portrait was painted by William Merritt Chase around 1884.

== Commemoration ==
His funeral service was attended by 500 mourners who travelled to Lawrence on a special train from Long Island City, but by no members of his immediate family.

In 1910, J. P. Morgan donated $100,000 to Yale University to establish the William M. Laffan Professorship of Assyriology and Babylonian Literature in his memory.
