= Dave Watson (playwright) =

Scottish writer

Dave Watson (c. 1946–1998) was a Scottish playwright, actor and director.

He is mainly known as the author of The Last Munro. He also acted and directed for the Dumbarton People's Theatre (DPT) for a number of years. He wrote some other material, including a play on Robert the Bruce, and took part in writing the DPT pantomime for several years.

He worked as an art teacher at Dumbarton Academy.
