= Myron L. Coulter =

American university administrator

Myron Lee ‘Barney’ Coulter, Ed.D. (March 21, 1929 – October 4, 2011) was an American university professor, administrator, and president/chancellor. From 1968 to 1976, Coulter served as associate dean/professor of education, vice president for institutional services, vice president for administration, and interim president at Western Michigan University in Kalamazoo. The Coulter Faculty Commons for Excellence in Teaching and Learning is part of Western Carolina. He was appointed President of Idaho State University in Pocatello from 1976 to 1984. In 1984, Coulter became 16th chancellor of Western Carolina University in Cullowhee, North Carolina, and served in that role until his retirement from higher education in 1994. Apart from Western Carolina, he was a member of several Cherokee groups.

He served in the U.S. Army as a Staff Sergeant during the Korean War from 1952 to 1954. Born in Albany, Indiana and son to Mark and Violet Coulter, he was a first-generation college student.

Coulter and Barbara Helen Bolinger of Dunkirk, Indiana, were married on July 21, 1951. They had twin children, Nan and Ben, who both have careers in higher education.

Coulter’s son, Benjamin M. Coulter, Ed.D., was appointed Chancellor of Western Governors University in April 2021.

Academic offices
Preceded by Charles Kegel	President of Idaho State University; 1976–1984	Succeeded by Clifford Trump
