= Experimenting with Babies =

2013 book by Shaun Gallagher

First edition (publ. TarcherPerigee)

Experimenting with Babies: 50 Amazing Science Projects You Can Perform on Your Kid is a 2013 non-fiction book written by Shaun Gallagher and illustrated by Colin Hayes.

The book provides a series of home-based experiments that can be performed on infants aged birth to two years to test their cognitive, motor, social and behavioural development. Many of the experiments are modified from "landmark" studies or from the academic literature generally. Each of the fifty experiments is rated in terms of its difficulty and the developmental stage of the infant; each includes details on relevant research and on the "takeaway" for parents.

Gallagher was inspired to write the book by informal experimentation with his own infant sons, who he has called his "two favourite science projects". He cited "bonding with your baby, the intellectual stimulation, becoming more exposed to the field of child development and all the cool stuff that's going on" as reasons to read Experimenting with Babies, but wanted to avoid suggesting any benchmarks or measures of intelligence for the babies.

== Reviews ==
In her review for Library Journal, Julianne Smith noted that "Some will naturally balk at the title, but this book actually provides a concise and relevant look at child development...It is a graceful bridge between parenting and research". James Hamblin of The Atlantic suggested to parents that "[your baby's] intellect is like that of a sentient grapefruit. But that doesn't mean your brain needs to go undernourished. You can feed on him as he feeds on you".

== Cultural influence ==
The book inspired an episode of CBS's The Big Bang Theory, "The Conference Valuation". In the episode Sheldon Cooper discovers a copy of Experimenting With Babies, and he and his friends attempt to experiment on Howard Wolowitz's children.

== Bibliography ==
- Gallagher, Shaun (2013). Experimenting with Babies: 50 Amazing Science Projects You Can Perform on Your Kid. Perigee. ISBN 9780399162466.
