= Hermitage Academy, Helensburgh =

Coordinates: 55.99454°N 4.69786°W

Hermitage Academy

Location
- Cardross Road; Helensburgh, Argyll & Bute, G84 7LA; Scotland

Information
- Type: Secondary school
- Motto: Nulla Virtus Sine Labore
- Established: 1880
- Head Teacher: Douglas Morgan
- Gender: Coeducational
- Enrolment: 1,260
- Colour
- Website: http://www.hermitageacademy.argyll-bute.sch.uk

Hermitage Academy is a non-denominational secondary school in Helensburgh, Argyll and Bute, Scotland. It is one of two secondary schools in the Helensburgh area (the other being Lomond School) and is currently the largest secondary school in Argyll and Bute.

The school catchment area extends from the Firth of Clyde to Loch Lomond and the Rest and be thankful, including in addition to the town of Helensburgh the villages of Cardross, Rhu, Shandon, Garelochhead, Clynder, Rosneath, Kilcreggan, Arrochar, Tarbet and Luss and other rural areas. Since this catchment area straddles the Highland Boundary Fault Line, the school is uniquely both a Lowland and a Highland school.

== History ==
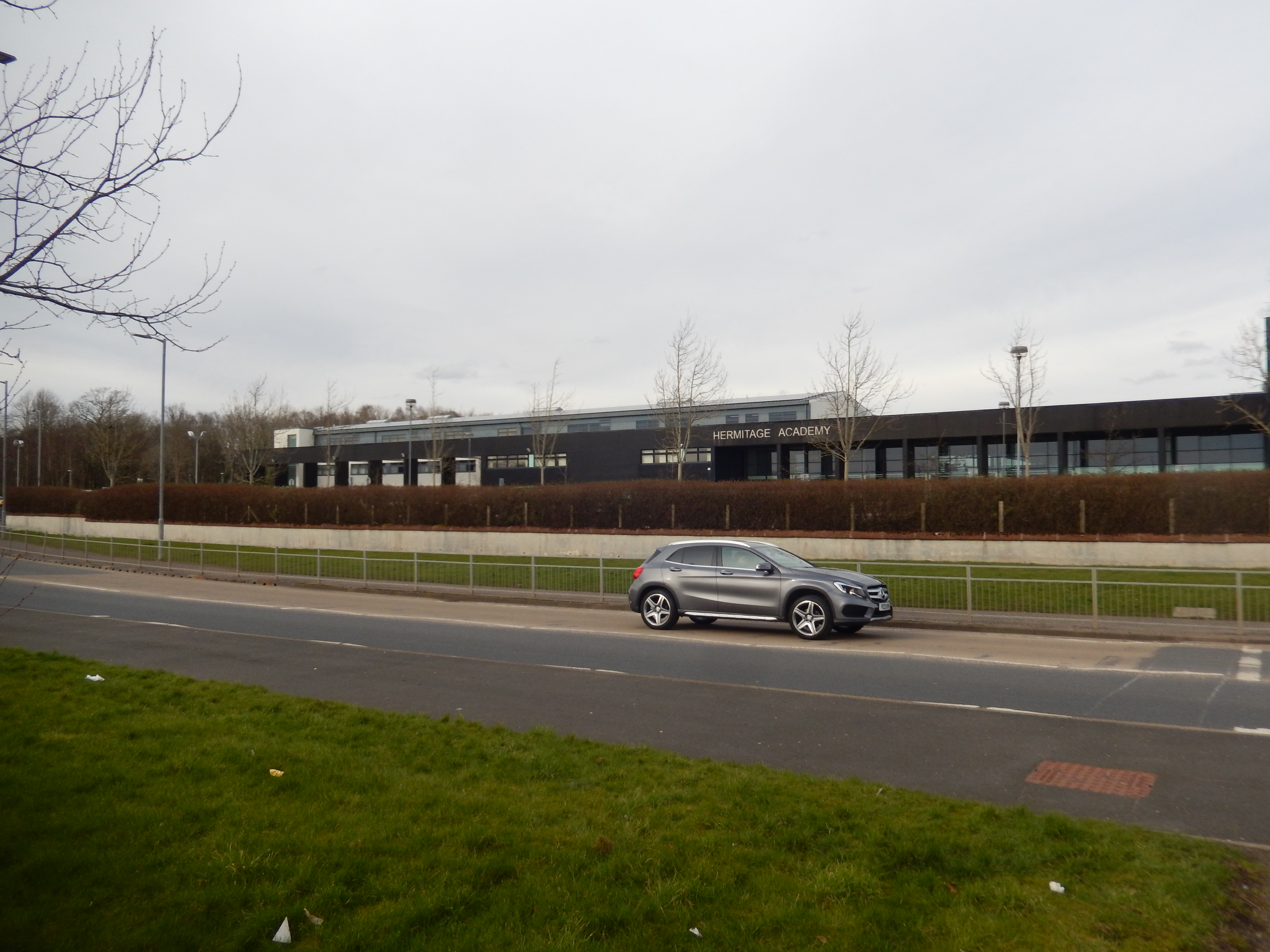
Hermitage Academy, Cardross Road building

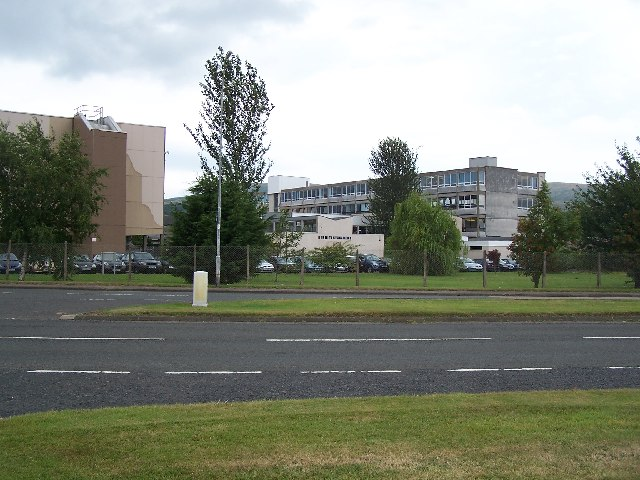
1966-2008 Hermitage Academy buildings

The school was originally located in East Argyle Street next to the current primary school. The first Gothic building, with four classrooms and a music room and an intended capacity of 500, opened in 1880. In 1966, after complaints of overcrowding, the secondary school was replaced by a new building at Campbell Drive, Helensburgh, but when this proved too small, a second building of equal capacity was built beside it. In February 2008 the school was again relocated to a new campus on the outskirts of the town. The school badge features the main entrance of the original Hermitage School.

Robert Williamson retired at the end of the school term in 2020. Prior to joining Hermitage in 2017, Mr Williamson was Head Teacher at Drumchapel High School. Mr Williamson replaced Geoff Urie, who retired in June 2017. The role was filled until October 2017 by David Mitchell, the substantive Head Teacher of Dunoon Grammar School.

Douglas Morgan took up the post of Acting Head Teacher in January 2021. He was appointed permanent Head Teacher in November 2022.

The school's motto is Nulla Virtus Sine Labore, which translates to Nothing Achieved Without Hard Work.

As of November 2018, the school had 1284 pupils and almost 100 teaching staff.

== Notable alumni ==
- Marco Biagi – former Minister of the Scottish Government
- Hazel Irvine – BBC sports presenter and journalist
- Ross King – Los Angeles correspondent on ITV morning shows Daybreak and Lorraine
- Nigel Healey – academic, currently Vice-President at the University of Limerick
- Stephen Park – former Team GB sailor and current performance director for British Cycling
- Derek Parlane – Rangers, Leeds United and Scotland footballer (1970–1988)
- Luke Patience – silver medallist sailor at the 2012 London Olympics
- Richard Tait – Creator of Cranium and former Microsoft employee of the year
- Very Rev Peter Donald Thomson – Moderator of the General Assembly of the Church of Scotland in 1934
- Tom Gallacher, Scottish playwright
- Lawrence Chaney, Drag Queen, winner of the second series of RuPaul's Drag Race UK
