= Sean Gallagher =

Sean Gallagher may refer to:

- Sean Gallagher (actor) (born 1965), English actor
- Sean Gallagher (baseball) (born 1985), Major League Baseball pitcher for the Colorado Rockies
- Seán Gallagher (born 1962), Irish entrepreneur, television personality and candidate in the 2011 and 2018 Irish presidential elections

== See also ==
- Seán Ó Gallchóir, Irish sports statistician
- Shaun Gallagher, American philosopher
- Shaun Gallagher (author), American nonfiction writer
- Shawn Gallagher of Beyond the Embrace
