= Patrick Gallagher =

Patrick Gallagher may refer to:

- Patrick Gallagher (actor) (born 1968), Canadian actor
- Patrick Gallagher (designer), American designer
- Patrick Gallagher (footballer), soccer player
- Patrick Gallagher (politician) (born 1946), former Irish politician with Sinn Féin the Workers' Party, Workers Party of Ireland and Democratic Left
- Patrick Gallagher (racing driver), stock car racer
- Patrick Gallagher (businessman), Irish property developer and businessman
- Patrick Gallagher (ventriloquist) (1800–1863), Irish ventriloquist
- Patrick D. Gallagher (born 1963), American physicist and chancellor of the University of Pittsburgh
- Patrick J. Gallagher (born 1949), president of San Francisco Giants Enterprises
- Patrick X. Gallagher, mathematician at Columbia University
- Paddy Gallagher (boxer) (born 1989), Northern Irish boxer
- Paddy "the Cope" Gallagher (1873–1966), founder of The Cope, or the Templecrone Agricultural Co-operative Society
- J. Patrick Gallagher Jr, American chief executive
- Patrick Gallagher, US Marine and namesake of the destroyer USS Patrick Gallagher (DDG-127)

== See also ==
- Pat Gallagher (disambiguation)
- Hugh Gallacher (footballer, born 1870) (1870–1941), Scottish footballer, known as "Paddy"
- Pat Gallacher (1881–1951), Scottish footballer
- Pat Gallacher (footballer, born 1913) (1913–1983), Scottish footballer
- Patrick Gallacher (1909–1992), Scottish footballer (Sunderland)
- Patsy Gallacher (1891–1953), Irish footballer (Celtic)
