= James Gallagher =

James, Jim, or Jimmy Gallagher may refer to:

- James Gallagher (Australian footballer) (born 1979), Australian rules footballer
- James Gallagher (baseball) (born 1985), American baseball player
- James Gallagher (bishop) (died 1751), Irish bishop
- James Gallagher (California politician) (born 1981), American politician
- James Gallagher (Gaelic footballer), Irish Gaelic footballer
- James Gallagher (Irish politician) (1920–1983), Irish politician
- James Gallagher (mayor) (1860–1925), Irish politician
- James Gallagher (soccer) (1909–1992), American soccer player
- James A. Gallagher (1869–1957), American politician
- James J. Gallagher (1926–2014), American educator
- James J. A. Gallagher (1927–1992), American politician
- James Samuel Gallagher (1845–1907), American politician
- James T. Gallagher (1904–2002), American sportswriter and baseball executive
- Jimmy Gallagher (1901–1971), Scottish American soccer player

== See also ==
- James Gallaher, Presbyterian Chaplain of the United States House of Representatives, 1852
- Jim Gallagher (disambiguation)
