= Peter Donald Thomson =

Scottish minister

Peter Donald Thomson (1872–1955) was a Scottish minister who served as Moderator of the General Assembly of the Church of Scotland in 1934.

== Life ==
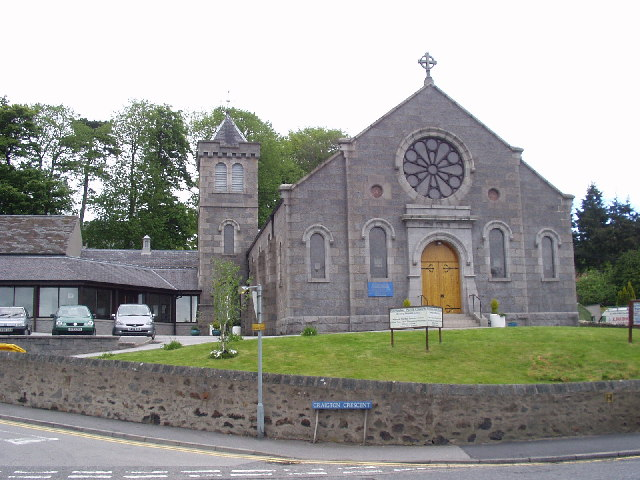
Peterculter Free Church (now Peterculter Parish Church)

He was born in Glasgow.

He was educated at Hermitage Academy in Helensburgh. He studied divinity at Glasgow University then studied at the Free Church College in Glasgow. He was ordained as a minister in the Free Church of Scotland in 1897, his first charge being the newly built Peterculter Free Church near Aberdeen.

After a short time in Kirkcaldy, he joined the United Free Church of Scotland and moved to Kelvinside (Botanic Gardens) in western Glasgow. The church was remodelled internally by Charles Rennie Mackintosh in 1909 under the umbrella of the Glasgow firm of Honeyman and Keppie.

He served as a chaplain to the army during the First World War. In 1929 the United Free Church merged with the Church of Scotland and he was thererafter a Church of Scotland minister. In 1934 he rose to the head of the church as its moderator for 1934/35.
