= John Gallagher =

John Gallagher may refer to:

== Sportspeople ==
- John Gallagher (runner) (1890–1950), American long-distance runner
- John Gallagher (baseball) (1892–1952), Major League Baseball player
- John Gallagher (basketball) (born 1977), head men's basketball coach at the University of Hartford
- John Gallagher (golfer) (born 1981), Scottish professional golfer
- John Gallagher (ice hockey) (1909–1981), professional ice hockey player
- John Gallagher (rugby) (born 1964), British-born New Zealand rugby union, and rugby league footballer
- John Gallagher (rugby league), rugby league player for Batley
- John Bán Gallagher, Gaelic footballer for Donegal
- John J. Gallagher (coach) (1904–1982), American college football and basketball player and coach

== Politicians ==
- John E. Gallagher (politician), American politician
- John P. Gallagher (1932–2011), American politician in the New Jersey Senate
- John J. Gallagher (politician) (born 1944), American politician in the New Jersey General Assembly
- John S. Gallagher (1849–1920), Ontario merchant and political figure

== Others ==
- John Gallagher (barrister), member of the board of the Australian Broadcasting Corporation
- John Gallagher (bishop) (1846–1923), Irish-born bishop of the Australian Roman Catholic Archdiocese of Canberra and Goulburn
- John Gallagher (businessman) (born 1939), New Zealand businessman and philanthropist
- John Gallagher (cartoonist) (1926–2005), American cartoonist
- John Gallagher (geologist) (1916–1998), Canadian geologist and businessman
- John Gallagher (journalist) (born 1949), American business journalist, author
- John Gallagher (c. 1805—1873), Irish sculptor.
- John Andrew Gallagher (1919–1980), British historian
- John Gallagher Jr. (born 1984), American actor and musician
- John Gallagher III (born 1947), American astronomer
- John E. Gallagher (1958–2019), American television director
- John M. Gallagher (born 1966), United States district judge
- John Gallagher, guitarist/vocalist for the American death metal band Dying Fetus
- John Gallagher, bassist/vocalist for the English heavy metal band Raven
- John Gallagher (fl. 1830s), American naval commander, in command of USS Vandalia

== See also ==
- Gallagher (surname)
- Jon Gallagher (born 1996), Irish footballer
- Jack Gallagher (disambiguation)
- Jackie Gallagher (disambiguation)
- John Gallacher (disambiguation)
