= Paul Gallagher =

Paul Gallagher may refer to:

- Paul Gallagher (barrister) (born 1955), Attorney General of Ireland, 2007–2011
- Paul Gallagher (bishop) (born 1954), diplomat of the Holy See
- Paul Gallagher (footballer) (born 1984), Scottish football player for Preston North End
- Paul Gallagher (trade unionist) (born 1944), English trade union leader
- Paul Gallagher, older brother of Noel and Liam Gallagher

== See also ==
- Paul Gallacher (born 1979), Scottish football goalkeeper (Dundee United, Norwich City, Dunfermline Athletic, St. Mirren, Partick Thistle, Scotland)
