= Jack Gallagher =

Jack Gallagher may refer to:

- Jack Gallagher (comedian) (born 1953), American comedian, actor and writer
- Jack Gallagher (composer) (born 1947), American composer and college professor
- Jack Gallagher (historian) (1919–1980), British historian
- Jack Gallagher (oilman) (1916–1998), Canadian oil and gas executive
- Gentleman Jack Gallagher (born 1990), British professional wrestler
- Jack Gallagher, character in And Millions Will Die

== See also ==
- Jackie Gallagher (disambiguation)
- John Gallagher (disambiguation)
