= Michael Gallagher (postman and prognosticator) =

Irish postman from County Donegal

- Occupation: Postman
- Known for: Weather predictions

Michael Gallagher is an Irish postman from County Donegal, known for accurately predicting weather-related events in Ireland. He studies the behaviour of animals and plants to determine the nature of the weather. His predictions have been disputed by Met Éireann and their scientific methods yet he says between 70 and 80 per cent of his predictions come true.

The Evening Herald has described him as "one of the country's more unusual forecasters". According to The Irish Times, he is the most well-known amateur forecaster in Ireland.

His first book, Old Traditional Weather Signs, was released in August 2009, his second book Remedies and Cures of Bygone Era launched in June 2012.

== Biography ==
Gallagher has been a postman for more than 40 years. He lives in Glenfin, a village near Cloghan in County Donegal. He was featured on RTÉ Radio 1 programme Mooney in December 2006, in a show dedicated to the decline of the rural post office in Ireland.

Gallagher has been involved in the prediction of weather events for at least 25 years. He studied the methods used by people from the Bluestack Mountains. He does not believe in the legend of Saint Swithin's Day – that if it rains it will rain for forty more days.

He accompanied his daughter to China to compete in the Special Olympics – she claimed a silver medal for Ireland.

== Widely publicised predictions ==
Gallagher first came to national attention in 2007 when he predicted an end to rain that summer. There was "massive interest" in his methods of prediction.

In May 2009, he predicted sunny weather for the Irish summer. He claimed that thunder and lightning that month meant there would be good weather later, according to old traditions. In July 2009, he predicted that sunny weather would end on 22 August, that the weather would deteriorate after this time but improve again that September. A weather forecaster in New Zealand agreed with him.

In December 2009, he predicted that he was "90 per cent certain" there would be snow in Ireland on Christmas Day, also known as a "White Christmas" He pointed to the way animals such as cattle, foxes and sheep were behaving and the way in which the grass had grown in late October. Met Éireann officials have stated that they could not tell at that time if it was likely there would be a snowfall.

He predicted 2010's spell of freezing weather.

In October 2012, Gallagher predicted "plenty of snow" before Christmas 2012. The Met Éireann December 2012 Monthly Weather Bulletin recorded limited snow on three days, all confined to areas in the Midlands and West. Overall, Met Éireann summarised the weather in that month as "wet and warm in parts".

In June 2015, he predicted "a very good summer" for 2015, adding that the weather would "inevitably bring heavy downpours and plenty of thunder". The Met Éireann Summer 2015 report noted that the summer was "cool everywhere; wet and windy in most parts" with mean air temperatures all below average and with above average rainfall. Ireland West Airport recorded its dullest summer since the station opened in 1996.

He predicted the heatwave of 2018.
