= Ed Gallagher (scientist) =

British scientist (born 1944)

Ed Gallagher CBE FREng (born 4 August 1944) is a British scientist. He was a council member of English Nature and chair of the Pesticides Forum which is part of Department for Environment, Food and Rural Affairs (DEFRA). He is a Freeman of the City of London.

Gallagher was chief executive of the National Rivers Authority from 1992 until 1995 when it was subsumed into the Environment Agency (EA) of England and Wales. He was then chief executive of the EA from 1995 to 2000.

Gallagher was chairman of the governors at Middlesex University, where he is a visiting professor. He is also a fellow of the Royal Academy of Engineering, and the Chartered Institution of Water Environment Management, and a companion of the Institute of Management. He was also Chairman of the board of Trustees at the UK education charity Envision. In 2001, he was awarded the CBE for his environmental services. He served as the Renewable Fuels Agency's and energywatch's chairman as well.

In February 2008, Gallagher began coordinating a group that will produce a Review of the Indirect Effects of Biofuels. According to the report web page:

This was done in the light of new evidence suggesting that an increasing demand for biofuels might indirectly cause carbon emissions because of land use change, and concerns that demand for biofuels may be driving food insecurity by causing food commodity price increases.
