= John Gallacher, Baron Gallacher =

British politician (1920–2004)

The Right Honourable The Lord Gallacher

Member of the House of Lords
- Lord Temporal
- Life peerage 28 March 1983 – 4 January 2004

Personal details
- Born: John Gallacher; 7 May 1920 Alexandria, Dunbartonshire, Scotland
- Died: 4 January 2004 (aged 83) Kent, England
- Party: Labour Co-operative

John Gallacher, Baron Gallacher (7 May 1920 – 4 January 2004) was a British co-operative official and politician.

Gallacher born in Alexandria, Dunbartonshire, was educated at St. Patrick's High School, Dumbarton and worked for Vale of Leven Co-operative Society before World War II. He served in the Royal Air Force then joined the Scottish Co-operative Wholesale Society (SCWS) in Dumbarton as a trainee in Glasgow. In 1949, he was sent on a SCWS scholarship to the Co-operative College in Loughborough for two years and gained a Co-operative Secretary's Diploma (CSD). He went on to work as assistant educational secretary at the Royal Arsenal Co-operative Society in South London, and then moved to be education secretary with the Enfield Highway Co-operative Society. He was then the Southern Sectional Secretary of the Co-operative Union, leaving for a short while to be labour advisor to the Motor Agents' Association before returning to the Union. After joining the International Co-operative Alliance as Administrative Officer he became Parliamentary Secretary to the Co-operative Union in 1973, gaining profile and parliamentary support for the movement.

Gallacher was created Baron Gallacher, of Enfield in Greater London, on 28 March 1983, on the recommendation of Lord Jacques. He sat as a Labour Co-operative peer and from 1985 to 1992, he served as a Labour whip in the House of Lords. He spoke with authority on European matters. In addition, he was for a period President of the Institute of Meat.
