= Thomas Gallagher (Pittsburgh mayor) =

American politician

52nd Mayor of Pittsburgh
- In office January 15, 1959 – December 2, 1959
- Preceded by: David Lawrence
- Succeeded by: Joe Barr
- Constituency: Brookline neighborhood

Personal details
- Born: November 20, 1883 Pittsburgh, Pennsylvania, U.S.
- Died: March 14, 1967 (aged 83) Pittsburgh, Pennsylvania, U.S.
- Party: Democratic

Thomas Gallagher (November 20, 1883 – March 14, 1967) served as Mayor of Pittsburgh during the transition year of 1959.

== Early life ==
Gallagher was born in Pittsburgh and started his career as a glassblower in the industrial plants of the region. He ran successfully as a Union representative during his blue collar days.

== Pittsburgh politics ==
He started his public political career in the Commonwealth Assembly representing Pittsburgh neighborhoods in Harrisburg. In 1933 he came back to the city and was elected City Councilmember. He served in that city legislative post for over twenty years climbing to the leadership position of Council President, one step below Mayor. When David L. Lawrence resigned his post as the city's top executive to assume the governorship of Pennsylvania, Gallagher succeeded him as Mayor. He completed and provided the final push on several of the great Lawrence projects, presiding over the opening of the Fort Pitt Tunnel among other things. He also dealt with a lengthy and contentious Steelworkers strike that struck at the heart of the blue collar city.

In September 1959 Mayor Gallagher did what only a handful of American mayors have ever done. He welcomed Soviet Premier Nikita Khrushchev at the Pittsburgh International Airport while the Premier was on his goodwill tour of the United States. Legend has it that the mayor had to explain that the onion domes along the Monongahela River valley that Khrushchev saw were not a Potemkin Village built to impress him but the hard labor and heritage of slavs and Russian immigrants.

== Later life ==
After stepping down as Mayor he was again elected to a term on City Council, the body that he made his biggest political impact during his life. He died on March 14, 1967, and is buried in Pittsburgh's Roman Catholic Calvary Cemetery.

== Honors ==
An overlook on scenic Mt. Washington on Pittsburgh's southside is named for Mayor Gallagher.

== See also ==
- List of mayors of Pittsburgh

Political offices
Preceded by David L. Lawrence	Mayor of Pittsburgh; 1959	Succeeded by Joseph M. Barr
