= J. Patrick Gallagher Jr =

American chief executive

J. Patrick Gallagher Jr.
- Occupations: President, chief executive and chairman of the board of Arthur J. Gallagher & Co.
- Spouse: Anne
- Children: 4

J. Patrick Gallagher Jr is president, chief executive and chairman of the board of Arthur J. Gallagher & Co., the US-based global insurance brokerage and risk management services firm headquartered in Rolling Meadows, Illinois. The company was founded by his grandfather, Arthur James Gallagher, in 1927, who later brought his three sons, Robert, John and James, into the business at the end of World War II. The Gallagher family owns approximately 1% of the company, but continues to hold numerous leadership positions.

== Biography and career ==
Pat Gallagher has worked at Arthur J. Gallagher since 1974 when he joined the company as a Production Account Executive and became Vice President-Operations in 1985. Pat Gallagher joined the board of directors in 1986 before being named president and chief operating officer in 1990.

He took over as chief executive from his uncle, Robert Gallagher, when he died, and was appointed chairman of the board in 2006. Pat Gallagher's father, John Gallagher, held the role of vice chairman when his son became chief executive.

Aside from his role at Arthur J. Gallagher, Pat Gallagher is a member of the boards of the American Institute for Chartered Property Casualty Underwriters and the International Insurance Foundation. He is a member of the advisory council for Boys Hope Girls Hope of Illinois and a member of the board of advisors for Catholic Charities. He is also a member of the Economic Club of Chicago, the Executive Club of Chicago and the Commercial Club of Chicago. In addition, he serves as an Advisory Cabinet Member of the American Cancer Society's CEO's Against Cancer.

Pat Gallagher holds a Bachelor of Arts in Government from Cornell University.

== Personal life ==
Pat Gallagher and his wife, Anne, have four children. One of their sons is a regional leader of Arthur J. Gallagher's brokerage segment. Two of their other sons work as producers in the same division.

Pat Gallagher's brother, Tom Gallagher, is currently chairman of Arthur J. Gallagher International, Arthur J. Gallagher & Co.’s international division. A sister of Pat Gallagher heads up the company's brokerage segment in which a brother-in-law of his is a vice president of administration and development.
