= Frank Gallagher =

Frank Gallagher may refer to:

- Frank Gallagher (actor) (born 1962), Scottish actor
- Frank Gallagher (American football) (born 1943), professional American football player
- Frank Gallagher (author) (1893–1962), Irish journalist, editor
- Frank Gallagher (Brooklyn) (1870–1932), New York politician
- Frank Gallagher (ice hockey), Canadian–American ice hockey executive
- Frank Gallagher (rugby league) (died 1966), rugby league footballer of the 1920s for Great Britain, England, Yorkshire, Dewsbury, Batley, and Leeds
- Frank T. Gallagher (1887–1977), American jurist
- Frankie Gallagher, Northern Irish politician
- Frank Gallagher (Shameless), a fictional character in the British TV series Shameless
- Frank Gallagher, birth name of Medal of Honor recipient Francis T. Ryan (1862–1927)
