= Idaho State University =

Public research university in Pocatello, Idaho, US

- Former names: Academy of Idaho (1901–1915); Idaho Technical Institute (1915–1927); University of Idaho—Southern Branch (1927–1947); Idaho State College (1947–1963)
- Motto: Latin: Veritas Vos Liberabit
- Motto in English: "The truth will set you free"
- Type: Public research university
- Established: March 11, 1901; 125 years ago
- Parent institution: Idaho State Board of Education
- Accreditation: NWCCU
- Academic affiliations: ORAU; space-grant
- Endowment: $122.1 million (2024)
- President: Robert W. Wagner
- Faculty: 826 (Fall 2019)
- Students: 12,614 (Fall 2023)
- Undergraduates: 10,406 (Fall 2023)
- Postgraduates: 2,208 (Fall 2023)
- Location: Pocatello, Idaho, U.S. 42.861°N 112.434°W
- Campus: 1,000 acres (4.0 km^{2}); Small city
- Other campuses: Boise; Meridian; Idaho Falls; Twin Falls
- Newspaper: Idaho State Journal
- Colors: Orange and black
- Nickname: Bengals
- Sporting affiliations: NCAA Division I FCS - Big Sky
- Mascot: Benny the Bengal
- Website: isu.edu

- Location in the United States Location in Idaho

Idaho State University (ISU) is a public research university in Pocatello, Idaho, United States. Founded in 1901 as the Academy of Idaho, Idaho State offers more than 250 programs at its main campus in Pocatello and locations in Meridian, Idaho Falls, and Twin Falls. It is classified among "R2: Doctoral Universities – High research activity ".

More than 12,000 students attend Idaho State, with 57 percent of enrollment female and 43 percent male. The student-teacher ratio at Idaho State is 13:1 and 58 percent of students take classes full-time.

== History ==
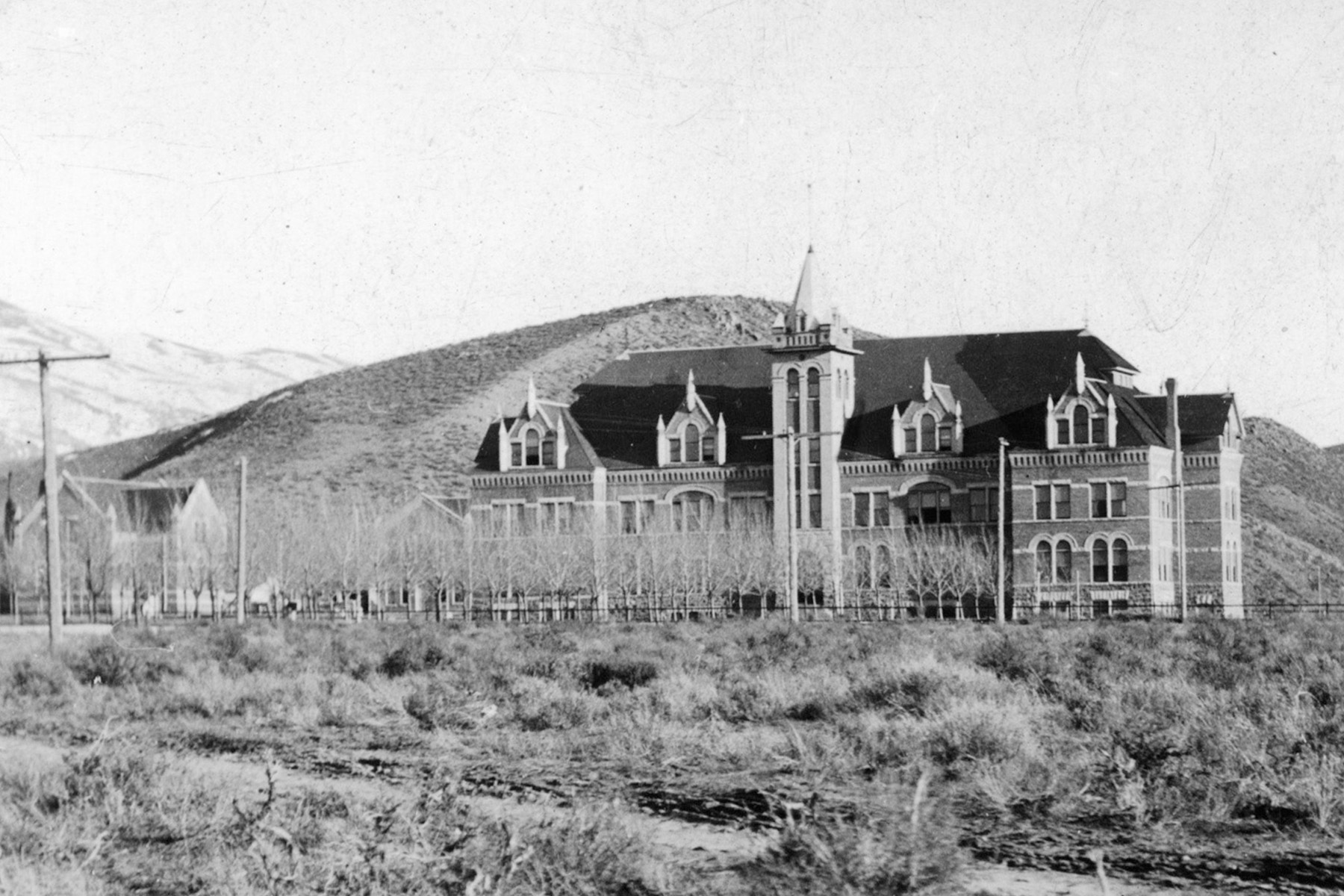
Swanson Hall was the first permanent building on campus.

On March 11, 1901, Governor Frank W. Hunt signed Senate Bill 53, to establish the Academy of Idaho, contingent upon private land donations being made for its site. Theodore F. Turner, mayor of Pocatello, settled the issue (Battle of the Blocks) by securing a permanent location for the academy. The Academy of Idaho officially opened its doors on September 22, 1902. Theodore Swanson, a member of the board of trustees, secured the services of John W. Faris as the first administrator, with the title of principal. By 1910, enrollment had reached nearly 300 students, and the academy had purchased four additional city blocks in Pocatello to meet its growing needs.

The Academy of Idaho was renamed Idaho Technical Institute in 1915. The end of World War I brought an influx of students to the school, and enrollment surged to more than 1,000 students. In the early 1920s, the institution officially adopted the Bengal as the school's mascot. Ralph Hutchinson was head football coach from 1920 to 1927, and he pushed to establish the tiger mascot and incorporate orange and black as the official colors. Hutchinson was an alumnus of Princeton, a university with a tiger mascot.

The institution was renamed in 1927, this time as the University of Idaho–Southern Branch, and continued as a two-year school, overseen by John R. Nichols. an executive dean. During World War II, Idaho was one of 131 colleges and universities nationally that took part in the V-12 Navy College Training Program, which offered students a path to a Navy commission.

After Nichols left in 1946, Carl McIntosh, an associate professor of speech, was named the acting executive dean in January 1947. That March, the school was elevated to four-year status and officially became Idaho State College. At the age of 32, McIntosh was appointed the first president of Idaho State College, and he was one of the youngest college presidents in the United States. Although McIntosh was not originally interested in being an administrator, once the school became an independent college, he decided to remain president and see the institution through its early growing pains. Idaho State College was accredited as a four-year degree granting institution in December 1948, after much work by McIntosh and the faculty. Enrollment reached 2,000 in 1949. McIntosh left ISC in 1959 to become president of Long Beach State College, and he was succeeded by Donald E. Walker.

On July 1, 1963, ISC was renamed for the fifth and final time to Idaho State University, reflecting its new status as a four-year public university.

In the ensuing years, Idaho State continuously expanded both its enrollment and the programs it offered. The presidency of Richard (Dick) Bowen, from 1985 to 2005, is particularly regarded as an era of growth. Bowen served as the president of Idaho State for 20 years, and Connie, his wife, dedicated her time to cultivating community relationships and enhancing long-standing campus traditions. During their tenure at ISU, the Bowens brought several projects forward, including the Stephens Performing Arts Center and Rendezvous Center. Bowen resigned after a vote of no confidence from the faculty, who were angered by generous pay raises for administration members in the midst of calls for fiscal austerity.

Arthur Vailas, former vice chancellor of the University of Houston System and vice president of the University of Houston in Texas, became president of Idaho State on July 1, 2006. He succeeded Michael Gallagher, who had served as interim president for one year during the transition. In February 2011, a majority of ISU faculty voted no confidence in Vailas and called for his resignation. This was also followed by a vote of no confidence by the students. Although Vailas faced mounting criticism and pressure from faculty and students to step down, he refused to resign and campus tension intensified. In February 2011, the Idaho State Board of Education decided to suspend the University's faculty senate. As a result of the move, in June 2011, the American Association of University Professors censured ISU. In June 2019, the AAUP removed Idaho State from the list of sanctioned institutions.

Vailas announced his retirement in August 2017, but he continued to serve as president until the expiration of his contract on June 17, 2018. He was succeeded by Kevin D. Satterlee.

== Campus ==
The elevation of its main campus in Pocatello is approximately 4,550 feet (1,390 m) above sea level.

Idaho State, along with the Idaho National Laboratory and other Idaho universities, worked to establish the Center for Advanced Energy Studies in 2007. Renovation of the ESTEC building began in summer 2007, after a team from ISU's College of Technology, Idaho National Laboratory, and Partners for Prosperity received grants totaling more than $2.5 million.

In fiscal year 2011, ISU underwent a reorganization designed to allow for better interdisciplinary research and collaboration. The School of Performing Arts was created to allow students to collaborate, learn, and perform at the next level. The Kasiska Division of Health Sciences, which includes the College of Pharmacy and College of Health, was reorganized to provide interdisciplinary education while serving the community through ISU's 18 clinics.

In 2011, ISU purchased the $3.6 million former Ballard Medical facility and The ISU Research and Innovation in Science and Engineering Complex (RISE) was created. At that time, research was focused on a Crystal Growth Laboratory (it can grow giant crystals to support nuclear science and engineering programs), High Power Laser/Optics Laboratory, Imaging Laboratory, and a Human Interactive Environment Simulation Laboratory. RISE was eventually closed, and the facility underwent a remodel to become the William M. and Karin A. Eames Advanced Technical Education and Innovations Complex, which is home to many College of Technology programs.

== Academics ==
Academic rankings

National
- U.S. News & World Report: 392-434
- Washington Monthly: 178
- WSJ/College Pulse: 601-800

Global
- U.S. News & World Report: 1733

Established in 2011, the Career Path Internship (CPI) program provides students an opportunity to gain professional experience while in school. All CPI internships are paid positions that are aligned with the student's major or career goals. In 2016 the CPI program provided professional experience in approximately 1,000 internships both on and off campus. The CPI program has seen exceptional growth in past years with a 2016 budget estimated at $2.3 million.

ISU offers two doctoral level nursing programs after the Idaho State Board of Education approved a doctoral degree in advanced nursing practice, which will now give ISU two doctoral-level nursing programs. The first offered is a Doctor of Philosophy (Ph.D.) degree in nursing beginning summer 2013 and the only one in the state.

ISU received top designation for nuclear training and was tagged Regional Center of Excellence. The Energy Systems Technology and Education Center (ESTEC) at the ISU College of Technology will soon be coordinating the nuclear energy education and training for technicians in a nine-state region. The Nuclear Energy Institute (NEI) has designated ESTEC as the Northwest Regional Center of Excellence for Nuclear Education and Training. The top designation includes the states of Idaho, Montana, Washington, Oregon, South Dakota, North Dakota, Utah, and Nebraska. ESTEC is one of five regional NEI-designated centers in the country.

ISU's new doctoral experimental psychology program, the only program of its type in Idaho, accepted its first three students fall 2011. The new experimental psychology doctoral program complements ISU's doctoral clinical psychology program, created in the early 1990s. Eventually, the experimental psychology program plans to accept six students annually. A new Idaho State University geosciences doctoral program is approved to begin in August 2013.

The Center for Sports Concussion at ISU, opened in 2009, is housed within the Department of Sport Science and Physical Education. The purpose of the Center for Sports Concussion is to offer educational outreach on concussion identification and management practices to athletic administrators, coaches, and parent groups throughout Idaho in accordance with Idaho law and demonstrated need, and to facilitate baseline and post-concussion neuro-cognitive testing to athletes participating in sports programs throughout eastern Idaho.

The university awards The Teaching Literature Book Award for the best book on teaching literature at the post-secondary or graduate level. The prize is conferred in odd numbered years, and the inaugural award was conferred in 2015. Past winners include Nancy Sorkin Rabinowitz and Fiona McHardy for the book From Abortion to Pederasty: Addressing Difficult Topics in the Classics Classroom.

== Health sciences ==
Idaho State's Kasiska Division of Health Sciences (KDHS) houses the majority of health-related professional programs in Idaho. The KDHS Family Medicine Residency Program is the only medical education program sponsored by an Idaho university.

Each year, the ISU Health Center receives more than 10,000 visits from students. The center treats patients for all types of medical issues and consultation costs are lower in comparison to mainstream health services across the country.

In 2009, Idaho State opened a new campus in Meridian, Idaho that delivers health professional programs as an addition to Idaho's Project 60 economic development initiative. In 2011 the Delta Dental Clinic was opened at the ISU-Meridian Health Science Center to serve low-income patients and provide advanced training for dentists. The 52,000 square feet (4,800 m^{2}) clinic consists of 17 clinical treatment rooms.

The ISU Meridian Health Science Center plans to open a new anatomy and physiology lab in 2014. The new lab, consisting of "state of the art" virtual applications, will allow students to work directly with the human body and its functions.

== Arts ==
In 1998, Idaho State University received a gift of $10 million from Thelma E. Stephens. It was seed funding for the $34 million center that would bear the Stephens' names. Construction began June 10, 2002. The center's design and construction was funded primarily through the support of hundreds of private donors as part of the university's $152.5 million capital campaign to fund a variety of needs. In fall 2013, ISU began to offer a bachelor's degree in dance. The new major is the only one of its kind offered within Idaho's university system. With the new Bachelor of Arts degree in choreography and performance, ISU's School of Performing Arts now consists of majors in music, theatre and dance.

== Student life ==
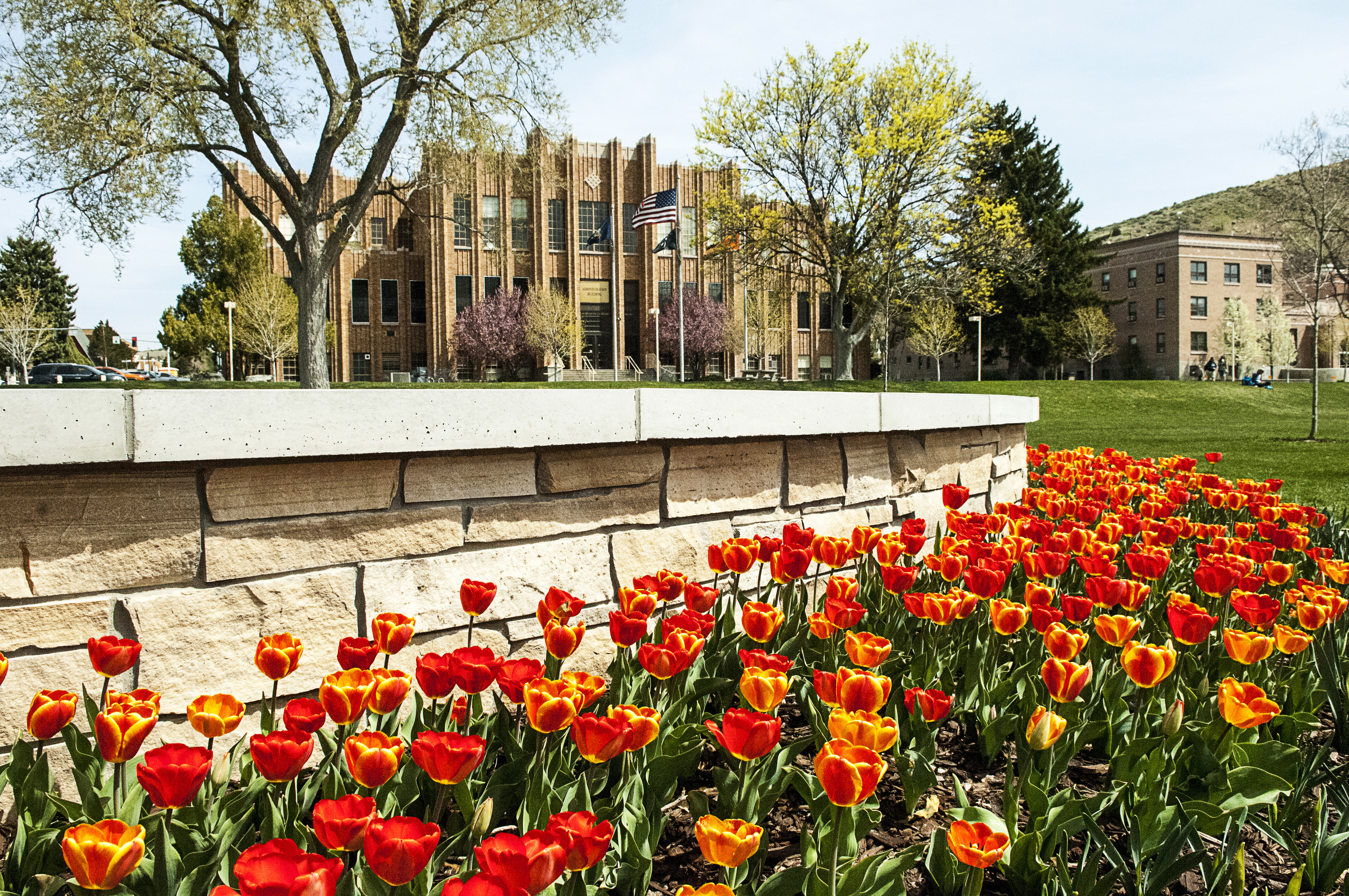
Idaho State University's Administration Building

Undergraduate demographics as of fall 2023
Race and ethnicity	Total
White	71%
Hispanic	15%
Two or more races	4%
Unknown	3%
American Indian/Alaska Native	2%
International student	2%
Asian	1%
Black	1%
Economic diversity
Low-income (Note: The percentage of students who received an income-based federal Pell grant intended for low-income students.)	40%
Affluent (Note: The percentage of students who are a part of the American middle class at the bare minimum.)	60%

Student government is administered by the Associated Students of Idaho State University (ASISU). Each year a president and vice-president are elected by the student body to administer and oversee a variety of activities either partially or fully funded by tuition-based fees. The ASISU Senate is the association's legislative body. Made up of 20 student members elected by the students of each individual college (allocation of seats being based on enrollment of each college), the ASISU Senate is primarily responsible for allocating the ASISU budget.

The Student Activities Board, formerly the ASISU Program Board, oversees most of the student activity programming on campus. The board plans concerts, movie showings, homecoming activities, athletic-related events and other activities generally associated with student life.

Reed Gym features recreational facilities, including a climbing wall, swimming pool, tennis courts, and more. The Pond Student Union operates a movie theater, billiard room, and bowling alley, and hosts many student club activities. Fine arts events are regularly featured at the performing arts theater.

ISU has more than 140 registered professional, academic, cultural, service and social student organizations. The cultural organizations host some of the largest events on campus with their "Cultural Nights" celebrations. There are currently four fraternity and sorority chapters that are recognized by the university.

Students at ISU are represented by the Associated Students of Idaho State University (ASISU). Every year the students elect a president, vice-president, and 20 senators. ASISU has administrative oversight of the 140 student organizations and provides funding to various groups that provide student involvement, leadership and service opportunities and events.

Student media on campus includes The Bengal, a weekly student-run newspaper and KISU-FM (91.1). KISU-FM broadcasts from the first floor of the Pond Student Union, serving the university and surrounding communities with alternative music, NPR programming, and live coverage of ISU women athletics. In 2010, KISU-FM and the university developed a monthly public affairs talk show FIRST MONDAY: Idaho State University Forum. The show provides insight into the university's programs, accomplishments and local interests.

The Pond Student Union, or SUB, serves as the community center for the university. The SUB consists of three floors that house among other things the campus bookstore, student government and organization offices, Outdoor Adventure Center, craft shop, ISU Credit Union, offices of the Vice President for Student Affairs, bowling alley, movie theater, Veterans Sanctuary, LEAD Center and numerous conference/banquet rooms used for meeting and large scale campus events. The SUB is also home for Campus Connection, a one stop shop for event tickets, photo ID and campus information (282-INFO).

The 255,000 square foot, five-level Rendezvous Complex built in 2007 is centrally located on the Idaho State University campus. The complex houses 50 classrooms, ranging from 15-seat seminar rooms to a 250-seat lecture hall. Other facilities in the Rendezvous include a large computer center and a large meeting room with partitions for conversion into three small meeting rooms, 80 student apartments with 301 beds and the Mind's Eye Art Gallery.

The Cooperative Wilderness Handicapped Outdoor Group, otherwise known as CW HOG, is a regional self-help group that was formed in 1981 to provide recreational opportunities for people of all abilities. CW HOG is kept going through dedicated volunteers.

In August 2010, Reed Gym announced the opening of a new addition, the Student Recreation Center, giving Reed nearly 100,000 square feet of recreational opportunities. Additions include added weight and endurance facilities, additional classrooms and teaching facilities, as well as open and window viewing areas to the four indoor tennis courts. Other amenities include racquetball courts, an auxiliary gym, a track, climbing wall, swimming pool, and spinning/multi-purpose rooms.

Table notes:

== Student housing ==
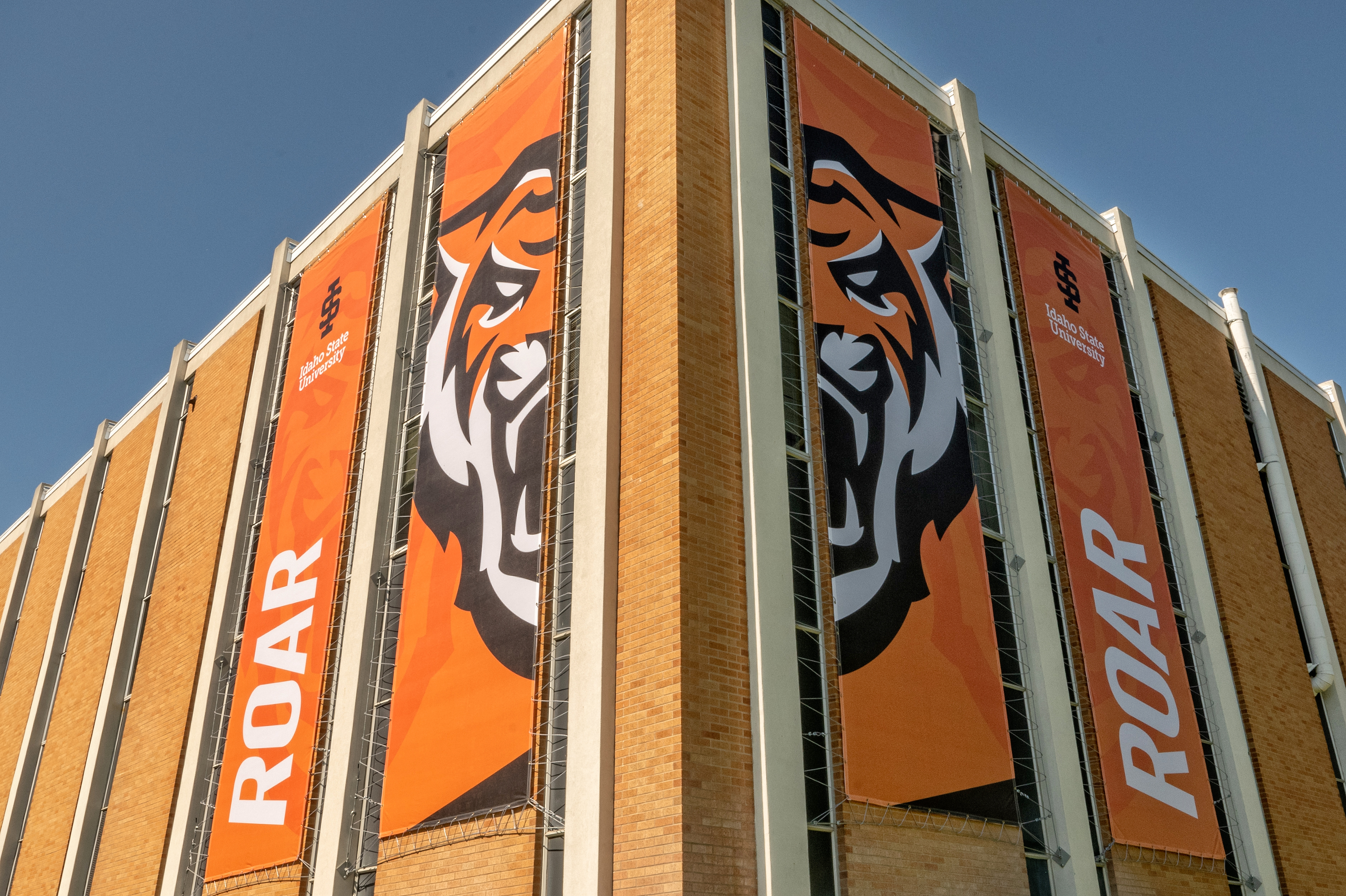
ROAR Banners on the Fine Arts Building

Idaho State University operates several residence halls and apartment complexes for its students. Residence halls include Rendezvous Hall, Turner Hall, Nichols Hall, Owen Hall, and Redfield Hall. On-campus apartments include Bengal Studios, McIntosh Manor (Building #57), Pulling Courts (Building #53), Ridge Crest Townhomes (Building #54), Schubert Heights, University Courts, and West Campus Apartments.

Students with dependent children may live in McIntosh Manor, Pulling Courts, and Ridge Crest Townhouses. Residents are within the Pocatello/Chubbuck School District. Zoned schools include Washington Elementary School, Franklin Middle School, and Century High School.

== Athletics ==
The Idaho State University Bengals compete as a member school of the Big Sky Conference in the NCAA Division I FCS. ISU won the NCAA Division I-AA national championship in football in 1981. It also won NCAA national championships in boxing as Idaho State College in 1953 and 1957.

In more recent years ISU has been competitive in track and field, winning the Big Sky Conference Indoor title in 2005 and 2006. The women's track and field team won their first outdoors women's Big Sky conference in 2007 with a score of 140.5 over Weber State. Dave Nielson was named the Big Sky Coach of the Year in women's track and field, and was later named the Mountain Region's Outdoor Women's Coach of the Year.

Home football games are played at the ICCU Dome (formerly known as Holt Arena), which has a seating capacity of 12,000 for football games and is the oldest enclosed stadium on a college campus in the United States. The ICCU Dome also hosts indoor track and field events.

For years the Bengals enjoyed athletic rivalries with the Boise State Broncos and the University of Idaho Vandals of Moscow. However, in football these rivalries diminished significantly after both BSU and UI left the Big Sky in 1996 to move up to Division I-A. The Bengals still enjoy a healthy rivalry in basketball with both the University of Idaho, who they have dominated in recent years; and Boise State, who has dominated ISU in recent years. With the University of Idaho moving back to Division I FCS in 2018, they, along with the Weber State Wildcats of Ogden, Utah, and the Portland State Vikings of Portland, Oregon, have become Idaho State's main rivals.

Idaho State also offers a rugby program that plays in Division II. Idaho State offers scholarships to rugby players in the form of allowing out-of-state students to pay the in-state tuition rate. Idaho State finished the 2010 regular season ranked ninth in Division II. Idaho State reached the semifinals of the 2011 Mountain 7s tournament, and reached the semifinals of the 2012 Pacific Coast championship.

In January 1968, the ISU student body voted on and approved the construction of the ASISU Minidome by a majority vote of 57 percent not to exceed $2.8 million and was financed by student revenue bonds. The Minidome opened 56 years ago in 1970 and was renamed as Holt Arena in 1988. It hosts on average 300,000 to 400,000 annually and events have an estimated annual economic impact of $15 to 20 million. Since its opening, Holt Arena events have provided roughly $600 million of economic impact to the local community.

Davis Field, home of ISU track and soccer, was built in 1936 as a public works project. It was originally called the "Spud Bowl" and is located at the base of Red Hill on lower campus. After Holt Arena was built, the football field became home to the Bengal track and field program, and the name was changed to honor Bud Davis, ISU's president from 1965 to 1975. In 1998, women's soccer was added as a varsity sport and Davis Field became its home.

ISU started a softball program in 1976, but the program was dropped after the 1983 season. In 2007, the program was reestablished. In 2011, Idaho State completed Miller Ranch Stadium, the home of Bengal softball. The Big Sky Conference added softball in 2013 and ISU won the first ever regular season Big Sky title. (40) ISU won the NCAA Division I-AA national championship in football in 1981. The Bengals also won NCAA national championships in boxing as Idaho State College in 1953 and 1957. ISU cross country team meets on the Centennial Course. The course is located east of the main campus at the Idaho State Research Park. The Bengals opened the course in 2002 and hosted the Big Sky Championship that same year.

Reed Gym is the refurbished home of Idaho State women's basketball, tennis, and volleyball. Featuring a seating capacity of 3,040, the building was remodeled in 2002 and officially reopened on December 17. It is also the home of the men's basketball team on occasions when Holt Arena is unavailable. In more recent years, ISU has been competitive in track and field, winning the Big Sky Conference indoor title in 2005 and 2006. The women's track and field team won its first women's outdoor Big Sky title in 2007. The women's soccer program won its fifth Big Sky Championship in 15 years in 2012 and the women's basketball program won its third Big Sky title since 2001.

In the spring of 2011, ISU's athletic department became fully certified without condition by the National Collegiate Athletic Association (NCAA). In the summer of 2010, the university received NCAA certification with one condition. To meet the NCAA requirement, ISU constructed a new women's softball complex and increased funding for the program, completed new intercollegiate locker rooms for women's volleyball, softball and basketball, and increased the number of women's athletic scholarships.

Through partnerships between ISU Athletics, ISU Credit Union and Idaho Central Credit Union, ISU received a new basketball court and football field in 2011. The official name of the Bengal basketball facility is Idaho Central Credit Union Court at Holt Arena. Reed Gym is called Idaho Central Credit Union Court at Reed Gym.

In 2013, the ISU Athletics finished third in the Big Sky Conference President's Cup. The third-place finish was the highest ever by ISU's Athletics department. ISU placed first in the conference in overall academics. Academically, Idaho State had a record 183 student-athletes named to Big Sky All-Academic teams in the academic year.

== Presidents ==
The following persons served as president of Idaho State University:

No.	Image	President	Term start	Term end	Refs.
Principals of the Academy of Idaho (1901–1915)
1		John W. Faris	1902	1907	
2		Miles F. Reed	1907	1919	
Presidents of Idaho Technical Institute (1915–1927)
3		Charles R. Frazier	1919	1925	
4		Jesse E. Retherford	1925	1927	
Executive deans of the University of Idaho—Southern Branch (1927–1947)
5		John R. Dyer	1929	1933	
6		John R. Nichols	1934	1946 (Note: Initially on leave of absence to work in Japan for Federal government. Latter left permanently to head New Mexico A. & M.)	
Presidents of Idaho State College (1947–1963)
acting (Note: Acting dean of the University of Idaho South Branch)		Carl W. McIntosh	September 10 1946	March 17, 1947	
acting (Note: acting president of Idaho State college)		Carl W. McIntosh	March 18, 1947	November 16, 1947	
7		Carl W. McIntosh	November 17, 1947	August 1959 (Note: Resigned to head Long Beach State college)	
acting		committee of five (Note: committee made up of William J. Bartz, bursar; Robert C. Stevenson, dean of the college; Junius Larsen, dean of liberal arts; Laurence E. dean of pharmacy, and Stanley J. Heywood, dean of education)	August 1959	January 31, 1960	
8		Donald Walker	February 1, 1960	August 31, 1964	
Presidents of Idaho State University (1963–present)
acting		Laurence E. Gale (Note: dean of the university); William F. Bartz (Note: bursar)	September 1, 1964	August 31, 1965	
9		William "Bud" Davis	September 1, 1965	August 19, 1975 (Note: Resigned to head the University of New Mexico.)	
interim		Charles H. Kegel (Note: academic vice president)	August 20, 1975	July 25, 1976	
10		Myron L. Coulter	July 26, 1976	July 31, 1984 (Note: Resigned to head Western Carolina University.)	
acting		Clifford Trump (Note: vice president of administration)	August 1, 1984	July 7, 1985	
11		Richard L. Bowen	July 8, 1985	October 10, 2005	
interim		Michael C. Gallagher (Note: Former president of Mesa State College)	October 11, 2005	June 30, 2006	
12		Arthur C. Vailas	July 1, 2006	June 17, 2018	
13		Kevin D. Satterlee	June 18, 2018	December 31, 2023	
interim		Brian Sagendorf (Note: vice president of operations)	January 1, 2024	January 28, 2024	
14		Robert W. Wagner	January 29, 2024	Present	

Table notes:

== Notable alumni ==
=== Sports ===
- Jared Allen – NFL defensive end, 2x NFL sacks leader (2007, 2011), 5x Pro Bowl (2007–2009, 2011, 2012)
- Ron Boone – current Utah Jazz announcer and former ABA player
- Wally Buono – Canadian Football League head coach; winningest coach in CFL history
- Bill Byrne – athletic director, Texas A&M University
- Jeff Charleston – NFL defensive end
- Jeff Cook – former NBA player
- Evan Dietrich-Smith – NFL offensive lineman, Super Bowl XLV champion
- Stacy Dragila – 2000 Olympic gold medalist, women's pole vault
- Matt Gutierrez – NFL quarterback
- Josh Hill – New Orleans Saints tight end
- Merril Hoge – ESPN commentator and Pittsburgh Steelers running back
- Eddie Johnson – NFL punter
- Dirk Koetter – NFL head coach and offensive coordinator, former head coach for Boise State and Arizona State Football
- Marvin Lewis – NFL head coach and defensive coordinator
- Dustin Lind – director of hitting and assistant hitting coach for the San Francisco Giants
- Ed Sanders – boxer, 1952 Olympic gold medalist
- Patrik Trhac – professional tennis player (did not graduate)

=== Other ===
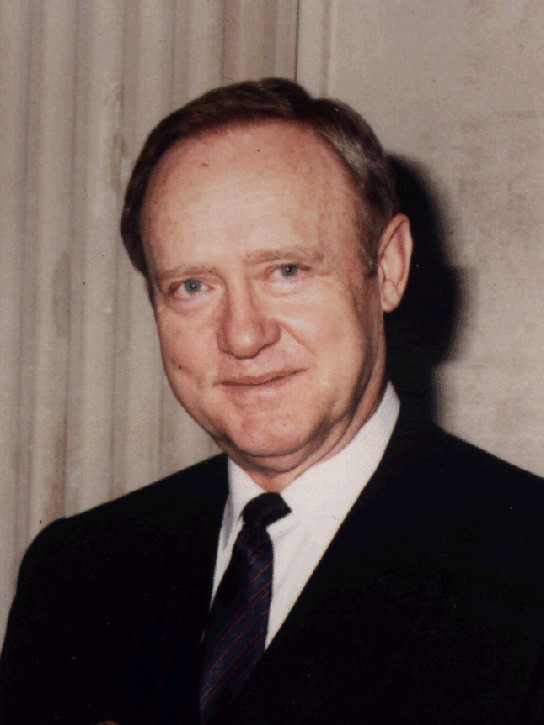
U.S. Sen. James McClure

- Don Aslett – author, speaker and founder of Varsity Contractors Inc.
- Shay Carl Butler – YouTube content creator, co-founder of Maker Studios (did not graduate)
- Beda Cornwall – librarian
- Stanley L. Klos – author, professional basketball player in Italy, United States Senate elections, 1994 West Virginia Republican nominee
- Sue Ane Langdon – actress
- Fred S. Martin – Idaho senator (2012–2022)
- James A. McClure – U.S. senator (1973–1991)
- Bruce Nelson – CEO, Office Depot (2000–2004)
- William Petersen – actor, star of CSI: Las Vegas
- Charles Potts – prominent counter-culture poet and publisher
- Antonio Taguba – retired United States Army major general
- Roger Williams – pianist

== See also ==
- Eli M. Oboler Library
