= Jim Gallagher =

Jim Gallagher may refer to:

- Jim Gallagher (American football) (1929–2017), former executive with the Philadelphia Eagles American football team
- Jim Gallagher (civil servant), Scottish civil servant and professor
- Jim Gallagher (footballer) (born 1931), former Australian rules footballer
- Jim Gallagher Jr. (born 1961), American professional golfer
- Jimmy Gallagher (1901–1971), Scottish-American soccer player

== See also ==
- James Gallagher (disambiguation)
