= Arthur J. Gallagher & Co. =

American insurance brokerage

- Type: Public
- Traded as: NYSE: AJG; S&P 500 component
- ISIN: US3635761097
- Industry: Insurance broker
- Founded: 1927; 99 years ago in Itasca, Illinois, U.S.
- Founder: Arthur J. Gallagher
- Headquarters: Rolling Meadows, Illinois, U.S.
- Key people: J. Patrick Gallagher, Jr. (Chairman & CEO); Thomas J. Gallagher (President); Patrick M. Gallagher (COO)
- Revenue: ▲US$13.9 billion (2025)
- Operating income: ▲US$2.26 billion (2025)
- Net income: ▲US$1.49 billion (2025)
- Total assets: ▲US$70.665 billion (2025)
- Total equity: ▲US$23.347 billion (2025)
- Number of employees: 72,000 (2025)
- Website: ajg.com

Arthur J. Gallagher & Co. (Gallagher) is an American insurance brokerage and risk management services company based in Rolling Meadows, Illinois, a suburb of Chicago. The company was founded in 1927 and provides insurance brokerage services and risk management services, the latter of which primarily includes the processing of workers compensation and automobile insurance claims.

The company is ranked 367th on the Fortune 500 and 192nd on the Forbes Global 2000.

Founded in 1927, the company ranks among the world's largest insurance brokers.

== History ==
=== Early years ===
Arthur J. Gallagher was established in 1927 as an insurance agency in Chicago by Arthur Gallagher.

In 1938, Gallagher contributed to the development of The Hartford Group’s Retrospective Rating Program, a plan designed to provide financial incentives to policyholders who maintained lower loss records. He also authored what is noted as Chicago’s first large-deductible fire insurance policy, issued to Bowman Dairy Co. At the time, both initiatives were regarded as innovative within the insurance industry.

After World War II, in 1945, Arthur Gallagher’s three sons—Jim, Bob, and John—joined the business.

In 1950, the company was formally incorporated, and each of the three sons was granted an equity stake in the firm.

=== 1980s-present ===
During the 1980s and 1990s, the company faced significant competitive pressures within the crowded domestic insurance market in the United States.

From 1990 through 2000, the company reported double-digit growth in all but three years, indicating a period of substantial expansion.

In 2000, Gallagher acquired 16 smaller insurance brokerages, which expanded its presence across the United States, eventually leading to operations in all 50 states.

The company began international expansion in 2002 with entry into India and Asia.

In February 2010, Gallagher acquired Securitas Re, a reinsurance brokerage firm based in São Paulo, Brazil, from Estater Gestão de Investimentos Ltda.

In March 2010, Gallagher announced an agreement to acquire all of the insurance brokerage operations of FirstCity Partnership, a London-based firm.

In 2011, Gallagher established operations in Singapore.

In December 2013, Gallagher acquired Bergvall Marine, an insurance brokerage firm based in Oslo, Norway.

The company expanded to Australia in 2014.

In December 2014, Gallagher announced the expansion of its brand presence in Australia through the rebranding of OAMPS Insurance Brokers, following its acquisition of the firm in June of the same year.

In November 2015, Gallagher announced the acquisition of insurance brokers Christie Phoenix (Victoria) and its affiliate Discovery Insurance Services, both based in Victoria, British Columbia.

In December 2015, Gallagher, through its New Zealand subsidiary Crombie Lockwood, acquired the insurance broker Reid Manson.

In June 2016, Gallagher announced that several Canadian brokerages operating under the Noraxis group would rebrand to Gallagher.

In July 2016, Gallagher acquired an 85% stake in Brim AB, a Stockholm-based specialty insurance and reinsurance brokerage firm.

In August 2017, Gallagher acquired Ballard Benefit Works, a Michigan-based employee benefits brokerage.

In February 2020, Gallagher acquired Affiliated Benefit Consultants, a benefits consulting firm headquartered in Oak Brook, Illinois.

In September 2020, Gallagher reported a ransomware incident affecting certain internal systems. In response to the security event, the company implemented precautionary measures including taking all global systems offline, initiating response protocols, launching an investigation, engaging external cybersecurity professionals, and activating business continuity plans to minimize disruption to customers. By September 28, 2020, the company indicated that it had restarted or was in the process of restarting most of its business systems.

In July 2022, Gallagher acquired Four Corners Group, an executive search firm based in Toronto, Canada.

In December 2022, Gallagher announced the acquisition of Interbrok Group, a retail insurance brokerage firm based in São Paulo, Brazil.

In April 2023, Gallagher acquired BCHR Holdings, operating as Buck, an organization specializing in human resources, pension, and employee benefits consulting services, for $660 million.

In September 2023, Gallagher acquired Eastern Insurance Group, a Massachusetts-based insurance provider that operates as a subsidiary of Eastern Bank.

Also in September 2023, Gallagher announced the acquisition of Lifesure Group Limited, a United Kingdom-based personal lines insurance broking service.

In October 2023, Gallagher acquired Cadence Bank's insurance brokerage unit for $904 million.

In January 2024, Gallagher acquired Köberich Financial Lines, an insurance broker based in Cologne.

In October 2025, Gallagher acquired Meadowbrook Insurance Agency, a retail insurance broker headquartered in Southfield, Michigan.

In August 2025, Gallagher acquired AssuredPartners, a U.S. insurance broker, for $13.45 billion ($12.45 billion net of tax benefits) in the largest sale of a U.S. insurance broker to a strategic acquirer in industry history.

In February 2026, Gallagher Bassett acquired Reck & Co GmbH, a specialist provider of global transport and marine claims services based in Bremen. Reck & Co offers surveying, claim handling, recovery, and loss prevention services.

In February 2026, Gallagher acquired Krose GmbH & Co KG, a commercial insurance and reinsurance broker based in Bremen.

== In media ==
- Robert E. Gallagher and Alison Kittrell, The Gallagher Way, released jointly by Marketing Counsel and iUniverse in 2005.
