= Shaun Gallagher (author) =

Shaun Gallagher is an American author of four nonfiction books:

- Experimenting with Babies (2013).
- Correlated (2014).
- Experiments for Newlyweds (2019).
- Experimenting with Kids (2020).

He is a former magazine and newspaper editor and runs the website Correlated.org, on which "Correlated" is based.

Experimenting With Babies: 50 Amazing Science Projects You Can Perform on Your Kid was published in October 2013 by TarcherPerigee, an imprint of Penguin Random House. The book adapts experiments from child-development research so parents can perform them on their babies. Gallagher was inspired to write the book by informal experimentation with his infant sons, whom he has called his "two favourite science projects".

Correlated: Surprising Connections Between Seemingly Unrelated Things was published in July 2014, also by TarcherPerigee. The book uses data from Correlated.org to present bizarre correlations. Freakonomics predicted in 2011 that Correlated "will launch a thousand graduate theses", and Pee-wee Herman encouraged his fans to "help further the cause of science" by contributing to Correlated.

Experiments for Newlyweds: 50 Amazing Science Projects You Can Perform With Your Spouse was published in April 2019 by Sourcebooks. As in Experimenting With Babies, the book adapts experiments from published academic research, but this time, the focus is on experiments that couples can perform with each other.

Experimenting With Kids: 50 Amazing Science Projects You Can Perform on Your Child Ages 2-5 was published in May 2020 by TarcherPerigee, an imprint of Penguin Random House. While the projects in Experimenting With Babies, are for ages 0-2, the projects in Experimenting With Kids are for ages 2-5.

== Bibliography ==
- Gallagher, Shaun (2013). Experimenting with Babies: 50 Amazing Science Projects You Can Perform on Your Kid. TarcherPerigee. ISBN 9780399162466.
- Gallagher, Shaun (2014). Correlated: Surprising Connections Between Seemingly Unrelated Things. TarcherPerigee. ISBN 9780399162473.
- Gallagher, Shaun (2019). Experiments for Newlyweds: 50 Amazing Science Projects You Can Perform With Your Spouse. Sourcebooks. ISBN 9781492669760.
- Gallagher, Shaun (2020). Experimenting With Kids: 50 Amazing Science Projects You Can Perform on Your Child Ages 2-5. TarcherPerigee. ISBN 9780143133551.
