= David Gallagher (disambiguation) =

David Gallagher (born 1985) is an American film and television actor.

David Gallagher may also refer to:

- David Gallagher (Australian footballer) (born 1980), former Australian rules footballer
- David Gallagher (Gaelic footballer) (born 1980), Meath Gaelic footballer
- Dave Gallagher (born 1960), baseball player
- Dave Gallagher (American football) (1952–2025), American football defensive tackle
- Dave Gallagher, creator of the animated web series MechWest

== See also ==
- Dave Gallaher (1873–1917), New Zealand rugby union footballer
- David Gallaher (born 1975), Video game developer and American comics writer
