= Neily Gallagher =

Gaelic footballer

Neily Gallagher (born in 1942 or 1943 (age 81–82)) is an Irish Gaelic footballer who played who played for Gaoth Dobhair and the Donegal county team, making his debut in 1961.

He won an Ulster Senior Football Championship medal in 1974. Described as "one of the most prolific freetakers" in the game, as well as having an "ability to stroke over points from all angles and distances", he also won the Railway Cup, the Lagan Cup and the Dr McKenna Cup during his career.

In June 1973, he was concussed, received several stitches and was admitted to hospital after being hit in the face 15 minutes into an Ulster Championship match with Tyrone at MacCumhaill Park — the Tyrone player was banned. In another incident, while about to take a penalty against Galway in the semi-final of the 1966–67 National League, the ball blew off the penalty spot — the referee awarded a free out.

In 2004, he worked as a school caretaker. His son James later played for Donegal too. Married to Helen, he also has a daughter, and another son, Manuel, with that son also playing for Gaoth Dobhair.
