= Hugh Gallagher =

Hugh Gallagher may refer to:

- Hugh Gallagher (advocate) (1933–2004), author and international disability advocate
- Hugh Gallagher (humorist) (aka Von Von Von), author and humorist

== See also ==
- Hughie Gallacher (1903–1957), Scottish footballer
- Hugh Gallacher (footballer, born 1870) (1870–1941), Scottish footballer
