= Michael C. Gallagher =

American academic administrator (born 1943)

Mike Gallagher
- Born: Michael Clyde Gallagher; April 15, 1943; Mineral Wells, Texas
- Died: August 17, 2023 (aged 80); Heber City, Utah
- Education: Southwest Texas State University, Texas A&M University
- Occupations: Academic lecturer and administrator

Michael Clyde Gallagher (April 15, 1943 - August 17, 2023) was an American academic administrator. He was a former President of Mesa State College (now Colorado Mesa University) in Grand Junction, Colorado. Gallagher later served as interim president of Idaho State University. He had also previously served as President of the University of Houston–Victoria and as Dean of Business there.

Gallagher was a professor of business administration. He earned his B.B.A. from Southwest Texas State University (now Texas State University–San Marcos). His M.B.A. and Ph.D. were from Texas A&M University.

Gallagher was vice president of Academic Affairs at Idaho State University in the early and mid-1990s. He left in 1996 to become president at Mesa State, serving in that capacity until 2002. In the 70s and 80s he served as director of the Small Business Institute at Southwest Texas State University, taught in the Troy State University MBA program in Europe (1977–79) and was chairman of the Department of Management at the University of Arkansas at Little Rock.

In October 2005 Gallagher returned to Idaho State to serve as interim president upon the retirement of Richard L. Bowen for the remainder of the 2005-06 school year while a search for a permanent replacement was conducted. In the fall of 2006 Gallagher was succeeded by Dr. Arthur C. Vailas.

After leaving Idaho State Gallagher returned to Mesa State, where he taught international business until his retirement in 2010. He died in Heber City, Utah on August 17, 2023, aged 80.

Preceding his career in education, Gallagher worked in management positions at Phillips Petroleum Company and Procter & Gamble and served in the U.S. Air Force (1961–65) as a Cryptographer.

Academic offices
Preceded by Raymond N. Kieft	President of Mesa State College; 1996–2003	Succeeded by Samuel B. Gingerich
Preceded by Richard L. Bowen	President of Idaho State University; 2005–2006	Succeeded by Arthur C. Vailas
