= Matt Gallagher =

Matt Gallagher may refer to:

- Matt Gallagher (author) (born 1983), American author
- Matt Gallagher (businessman) (1915–1974), Irish property developer and businessman
- Matt Gallagher (Coventry rugby union player) (1973–2026), English rugby union player
- Matt Gallagher (filmmaker), Canadian film director, producer and cinematographer
- Matt Gallagher (Gaelic footballer) (born 1960s), Irish former Gaelic footballer
- Matt Gallagher (rugby union) (born 1996), English rugby union player
- Mike Gallagher (footballer) (died 1984), sometimes referred to as Matt, Irish footballer
