= Pat Gallagher =

Pat Gallagher may refer to:

- Pat Gallagher (Labour politician) (born 1963), Irish Labour Party politician
- Pat "the Cope" Gallagher (born 1948), Irish Fianna Fáil politician
- Patricia Gallagher, director at the Académie du Vin and one of the 11 judges at the historic Judgment of Paris wine tasting event
- Pat Gallagher (American politician) (born 1974), Democratic politician from Pennsylvania

== See also ==
- Patrick Gallagher (disambiguation)
