= Charles Gallagher =

Charles or Charlie Gallagher may refer to:

- Shorty Gallagher (Charles William Gallagher, 1872–1924), American baseball player
- Charles Gallagher (Ontario politician) (died 1940), Canadian politician
- Charles Gallagher (New Brunswick politician) (1925–2007), Canadian politician
- Charlie Gallagher (Gaelic footballer) (1937–1989), Irish Gaelic footballer
- Charlie Gallagher (footballer, born 1940) (1940–2021), Scottish-born footballer for Celtic and Ireland
- Charlie Gallagher (badminton) (born c. 1957), Scottish badminton player
