= John Gallaher =

American writer

- Born: John Jerome Gallaher; January 6, 1965; Portland, Oregon, U.S.
- Education: Texas State University (BA)(MFA); Ohio University (PhD)
- Occupations: Poet, professor, and editor

John Gallaher (born January 6, 1965) is an American poet and assistant professor of English at Northwest Missouri State University, and co-editor of The Laurel Review, supported by Northwest's English Department.

== Life ==
John Gallaher was born in Portland, Oregon in 1965, but he was adopted by a family living in Houston, Texas in 1968. He received his MFA from Texas State University and his Ph.D. from Ohio University, where he worked for a time as an assistant editor of The Ohio Review. He currently resides in Maryville, Missouri, where he teaches creative writing and composition courses at Northwest Missouri State University.

== Work ==
Gallaher is the author or co-author of eight poetry collections, most recently My Life in Brutalist Architecture, which was inspired by his adoption story, the death of his adopted mother, and the reunification with his birth mother through DNA testing. His honors include the 2005 Levis Poetry Prize for his second book, The Little Book of Guesses (Four Way Books). His poetry has been published in literary journals and magazines including Boston Review, Colorado Review, Crazyhorse, Field, The Literati Quarterly, jubilat, The Journal, Ploughshares, and in anthologies, including The Best American Poetry 2008.

In addition to poetry, John Gallaher has been interviewed for his collage art.

== Bibliography ==
- Gentlemen in Turbans, Ladies in Cauls (Spuyten Duyvil, 2001)
- The Little Book of Guesses (Four Way Books, 2007)
- Map of the Folded World (University of Akron Press, 2009)
- Your Father on the Train of Ghosts (With G.C. Waldrep)(BOA Editions, 2011)
- In a Landscape (BOA Editions, 2014)
- Ghost/Landscape (with Kristina Marie Darling) (BlazeVOX, 2016)
- Brand New Spacesuit (BOA Editions, 2020)
- My Life in Brutalist Architecture (Four Way Books, 2024)
