= Jackie Gallagher =

Jackie Gallagher may refer to:

- Jackie Fairweather (1967–2014), née Gallagher, Australian female triathlete and long-distance runner
- Jackie Gallagher (footballer) (born 1958), male English footballer
- Jackie Gallagher (baseball) (1902–1984), American Major League Baseball player
- Jackie Gallagher-Smith (born 1967), American female golfer

== See also ==
- Jack Gallagher (disambiguation)
- John Gallagher (disambiguation)
