= James Gallagher (Gaelic footballer) =

Gaelic footballer

James Gallagher is an Irish Gaelic footballer who played for Gaoth Dobhair and the Donegal county team. He is a son of Helen and Neily Gallagher, who also played for Donegal, and has one sister and a brother, Manuel, with his brother also playing for Gaoth Dobhair.

From his 1994 debut, Gallagher played with Gaoth Dobhair until 2018, winning three Donegal Senior Football Championship titles and one Ulster Senior Club Football Championship title. For Donegal, he was involved in the 2002 All-Ireland Senior Football Championship games against Dublin at Croke Park, which Donegal lost after a replay. He later stopped playing for the county because of work commitments.

Gallagher married the week after his club's 2006 Donegal Senior Football Championship victory, and then visited Mauritius and Dubai, causing him to miss the Ulster Senior Club Football Championship game.
