= Goligher =

Goligher is a surname. Notable people with the surname include:

- John Goligher (1912–1998), British colorectal surgeon
- Kathleen Goligher (born 1898), Irish spiritualist medium
