= Peter Gallagher (disambiguation) =

Peter Gallagher (born 1955) is an American actor.

Peter Gallagher may also refer to:

- Peter Gallagher (comic strip artist), current writer of Heathcliff
- Peter Gallagher (rugby league, born 1937) (1937–2003), Australian rugby league footballer of the 1950s and 1960s who played in Queensland and represented Australia
- Peter Gallagher (rugby league, born 1941) (1941–2015), Australian rugby league footballer of the 1960s who played in New South Wales for Easts and Manly
- Peter Gallagher (American football) (born c. 1971), American college football coach
- Peter T. Gallagher, Irish astrophysicist
