= Patrick Gallaher (ventriloquist) =

Patrick Frederick Gallaher (1800 – 1863) was an Irish ventriloquist who was active in Ireland throughout the Victorian era.

Gallagher was born in Chapleizod, Dublin in 1800 and was performing in theatres on Grafton Street by 1825. Following his death in 1863, he was buried at Glasnevin Cemetery.

His son John Blake Gallaher was a political newspaper editor. John's daughter Fannie was an author, and his son Fred Gallaher, a journalist for the Freeman's Journal was referred to in A Little Cloud by James Joyce.
