= Gallacher =

Gallacher is a surname of Irish origin and is a variant of the Gaelic Ó Gallchóbhair found commonly in Scotland. The name Ó Gallchóbhair has been variously anglicised as Gallagher, Gallaher, Gallaugher, Goligher etc.

Notable people with the surname include:

- Brian Gallacher, Scottish footballer
- Bernard Gallacher, Scottish golfer
- Frank Gallacher, Scottish-Australian actor
- Hughie Gallacher, Scottish international footballer (Airdrieonians, Newcastle United)
- Jim Gallacher, Scottish football goalkeeper (Clydebank)
- Kevin Gallacher, Scottish football player and TV sports pundit
- Kirsty Gallacher, Scottish television presenter often specialising in sport programmes
- Liz Gallacher, British film music supervisor
- Mike Gallacher, Australian politician
- Pat Gallacher, Scottish footballer (Partick Thistle, Tottenham Hotspur, Luton Town)
- Pat Gallacher (footballer, born 1913) (1913–1983), Scottish footballer
- Patrick Gallacher,"Patsy", Scottish international footballer (Sunderland, Stoke City, Scotland)
- Patsy Gallacher, Irish footballer (Celtic)
- Paul Gallacher, Scottish international football goalkeeper (Dundee United, Norwich City, Dunfermline Athletic, St Mirren, Partick Thistle)
- Skeets Gallacher (1925–2013), Scottish boxer
- Stephen Gallacher, Scottish golfer
- Stirling Gallacher, English TV and stage actress
- Tom Gallacher, Scottish playwright
- Tommy Gallacher (1922–2001), Scottish footballer (Dundee)
- Willie Gallacher, Scottish trade unionist, activist and communist

== See also ==
- Gallagher (surname)
