= Tom Gallacher =

Scottish playwright (1932–2001)

Tom Gallacher (16 February 1932 – 27 October 2001) was a Scottish playwright. He originally came from Garelochhead and went to the Hermitage Academy in Helensburgh, but in later life he lived in Alexandria in Dunbartonshire.

He was involved with the Dumbarton People's Theatre.

== Plays for the stage ==
- Personal Effects, Pitlochry Festival Theatre, Perthshire, U.K., 1974.
- A Laughing Matter, St. Andrew's Theatre, Fife, Scotland, U.K., 1975.
- Hallowe'en, Dundee Theatre, Angus, Scotland, U.K., 1975.
- A Presbyterian Wooing (adaptor), Pitlochry Festival Theatre, 1976.
- Mr. Joyce Is Leaving Paris, King's Head, Islington, London, 1972 & 1973
- An adaptation of Cyrano de Bergerac

== Television Plays ==
- The Trial of Thomas Muir, 1977.
- If the Face Fits, 1978.

== Radio Plays ==
- The Scar, 1973.
