= Carolyn Gallaher =

21st-century American political geographer

Academic background
- Education: University of Mary Washington (BA); Miami University (MA); University of Kentucky (PhD)

Academic work
- Main interests: Political economy Cultural studies

Carolyn Gallaher is an American academic who is a political geographer and associate professor at the American University School of International Service. Her scholarship is focused on the role of paramilitaries in irregular warfare and the influence of the religious right in U.S. foreign policy.

Gallaher earned a Bachelor of Arts degree from the University of Mary Washington, a Master of Arts from Miami University, and a PhD from the University of Kentucky.

== Selected published works ==
- Gallaher, Carolyn; Dahlman, Carl T.; Gilmartin, Mary; Mountz, Alison; Shirlow, Peter (2009). Key Concepts in Political Geography. London: SAGE. p. 248. ISBN 978-1-4129-4672-8.
- Gallaher, Carolyn (2007). After the Peace: Loyalist Paramilitaries in Post-accord Northern Ireland. Ithaca, New York: Cornell University. p. 248. ISBN 9780801474262. OCLC 125403384.
- Gallaher, Carolyn (January 2007). "The Role of Protestant Missionaires in Mexico's Indigenous Awakening". Latin American Research. 26: 88–111. doi:10.1111/j.1470-9856.2007.00211.x.
- Gallaher, Carolyn (2003). On the Fault Line: Race, Class, and the American Patriot Movement. Lanham, Maryland: Rowman & Littlefield. p. 273. ISBN 0-7425-1974-0. OCLC 845530800.
- Gallaher, Carolyn; Froehling, Oliver (2002). "New world warriors: 'Nation' and 'state' in the politics of the Zapatista and U.S. Patriot Movements". Social & Cultural Geography. 3 (1): 81–102. doi:10.1080/14649360120114152. S2CID 145250446.
- Gallaher, Carolyn (2000). "Global change, local angst: class and the American Patriot Movement". Environment and Planning D: Society and Space. 18 (6): 667–691. Bibcode:2000EnPlD..18..667G. doi:10.1068/d269. S2CID 143828212.
- Gallaher, Carolyn (1997). "Identity Politics and the Religious Right: Hiding Hate in the Landscape". Antipode. 29 (3): 256–277. Bibcode:1997Antip..29..256G. doi:10.1111/1467-8330.00046.
