= Robert Gallagher =

British photographer

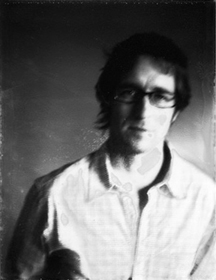
- Born: Robert Gallagher; 1969 (age 56–57); Kensington, London, England
- Known for: Photographer
- Website: http://gallagherphoto.com

Robert Gallagher (born 1969 in Kensington, England) is a commercial and editorial photographer currently based in Los Angeles, California. He has been awarded four times in the Communication Arts Photography Annual, named one of the 'Top 25 Photographers of 2016' by Creative Quarterly and is archived in The National Portrait Gallery in London.

== Education ==
Gallagher attended the Newcastle School of Art and Design, inspired by the work of W. Eugene Smith, Don McCullin, Eamonn McCabe, Walter Loos and Richard Avedon's portrait work, particularly "In the American West".

== Career ==
Gallagher's work has been published in international magazines including Time, Der Spiegel, Forbes, Vogue, Sports Illustrated, Newsweek, People, Empire, Q, The Times, The Face and The Guardian Weekend magazine. His commercial clients include Reebok, Canon, Mazda, Merrill Lynch and Vivendi Universal and he has also photographed advertising campaigns for Pepsi and Gatorade. Robert Gallagher has portraited world leaders, politicians and celebrities such as Prince Charles, Nancy Pelosi, Sidney Poitier, Tony Bennett, Clint Eastwood, Penélope Cruz, Jamie Cullum and Robert Pattinson, Kristen Stewart and Taylor Lautner from the Twilight films.

He has also covered significant subjects such as the hurricane Katrina survivors and the 9/11 rescue workers. In December 2001, just two months after September 11, his first solo exhibition "Ground Hero- Portraits of September 11" was profiled live by ABC News, during the charity opening night.

His work has been reported on internationally, most notably by The Northern Echo, Vantage magazine and Photo District News PDNPulse

Gallagher's portraiture is included in the archives of The National Portrait Gallery in London .

== Awards and Professional accomplishments ==
- Winner - Communication Arts (2021)
- Winner - Communication Arts (2017)
- Winner - American Photography 33 (2017)
- Winner - Communication Arts (2016)
- Winner - American Photography 32 (2016)
- Winner - Creative Quarterly "Top 25 Photographers of 2016" (2016)
- Winner - Communication Arts (2015)
- Winner - The APA Awards (2014)
- Honorable Mention; International Photography Awards (Editorial-Personality) (2009)
- Honorable Mention; International Photography Awards (Fine-art portrait) (2006)
- Honorable Mention; International Photography Awards (Editorial photo-essay )(2005)
- Honorable Mention; International Photography Awards (Editorial sports) (2005)
- Guest Editor/ Judge; Redism.com Worldwide Art Competition (2002)
- Winner; Hunters Armley Creative Photography Competition (1989)
- Mentor; Venice- Arts Photographic Project (2004, 2005)
- Mentor; Woodcraft Rangers, South Central L.A. High School photographic project (2003)
