= Gallagher family =

Irish clan

Gallagher Ó Gallchobhair
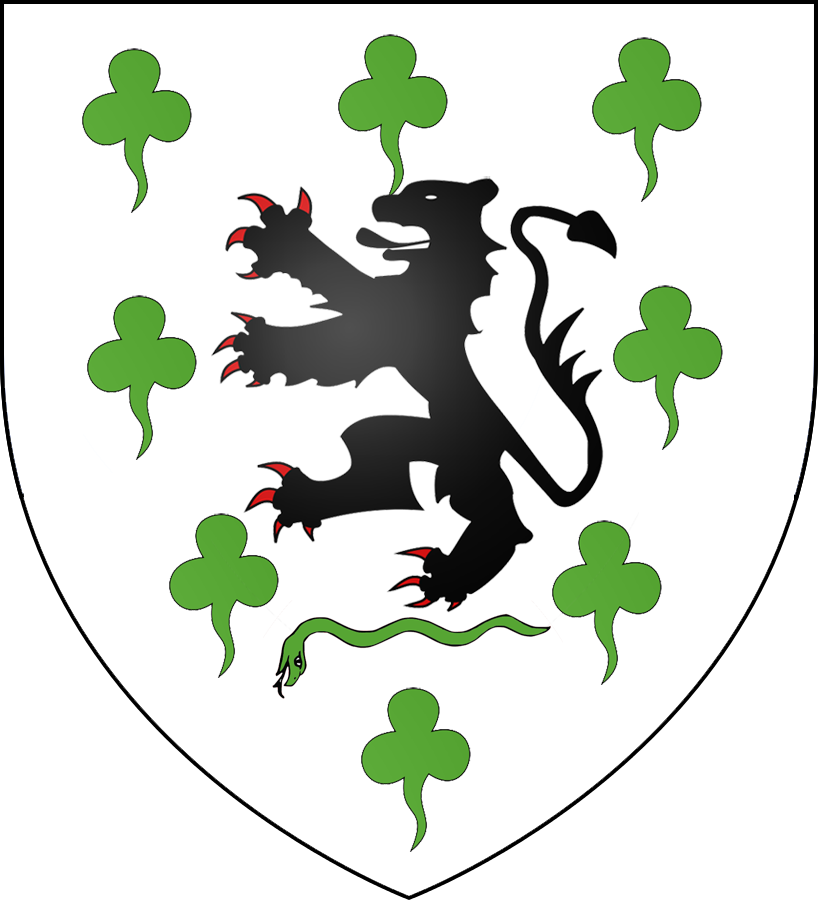
- Parent house: Northern Uí Néill
- Country: Kingdom of Tyrconnell
- Founder: Gallchobhar mac Rorcain
- Titles: High King of Ireland; King of Tyrconnell; Marshal of Tyrconnell; Chief of Cenél Aedha
- Cadet branches: Cannon; O'Muldorey

The Gallagher (Irish: Ó Gallchobhair) family of County Donegal, formerly one of the leading clans of Cenél Conaill, and therefore of all Ulster, originated in the 10th century as a derivative of their progenitor Gallchobhar mac Rorcain, senior-most descendant of Conall Gulban, son of Niall Mór Noigíallach (Niall of the Nine Hostages). The O'Gallaghers held the High Kingship of Ireland during the early medieval period. They also held the rank of hereditary Marshal of the Kingdom of Tyrconnell, ruled by their kinsmen the O'Donnells, from the 14th until the early 17th century.

== Naming conventions ==
| Male | Daughter | Wife (Long) | Wife (Short) |
|---|---|---|---|
| Ó Gallchobhair | Ní Ghallchobhair | Bean Uí Ghallchobhair | Uí Ghallchobhair |
| Ó Gallachóir | Ní Ghallachóir | Bean Uí Ghallachóir | Uí Ghallachóir |

== Ancestry ==
=== Origins ===
Conall Gulban, son of Niall Noígiallach, founded the kingdom of Tír Chonaill (Tyrconnell) in the 5th century. It comprises much of what is now County Donegal, and several surrounding areas. The following is a pruned and truncated version of the Conall Gulban family tree with Conall Gulban's brothers Eógan, to Lóegaire, also displayed. For clarity's sake the number of Conall Gulban's sons, grandsons and great-grandsons are not listed. Gallchobar is descended from Mael Coba brother of Domnall mac Áedo.

Genetic analysis of Gallagher Y chromosome haplogroups can trace back their origin to a single medieval, 5th-century individual, lending credence to the legend of Niall Noígiallach.

The prefix Mac means 'son of' and the now more popular Ua (later Ó') means 'grandson of, or, of the generations of'.

   Niall Noígiallach, died c. A.D.455.
   |
   |________________________________________________________________________________
   |               |              |          |               |                   |
   |               |              |          |               |                   |
   Conall Gulban Eógan Cairpre Fiacha Conall Cremthainne Lóegaire
   |               |              |          |               |                   |
   |               |              |          |               |                   |
   |        Cenél nEógain         |    Cenél Fiachach        |           Cenél Lóegaire
   |                              |                          | 
   |                         Cenél Cairpre                  / \
   |                                                       /   \
   |                                                      /     \
   |                                          Clann Cholmáin Síl nÁedo Sláine 
   |
  Cenél Conaill of In Fochla
   |
   |_________________________________________________
   |       
   |      
   Fergus Cennfota  
   |
   |_________________________________________________    
   |
   |   
   Sétna                                  
   |      
   |_________________________________________________
   |                                                |
   |                                                |
   |Ainmuire mac Sétnai, d. 569 Lugaid
    Rí/King of Ireland                              |
   |                                          Cenél Lugdach                                                                          
   |__________________________________________________
   |                  
   |                  
   Áed (mac Ainmuirech), d. 598    
   |                  
   |__________________________________________________________
   |                      |           |                      |
   |                      |           |                      |
   Domnall, d. 642 Conall Cu, Mael Coba, d. 615, Cumuscach, d. 597
   |             
   |                                  |_____________
   |                                  |            |
   |                                  |            |
   |                                  Cellach Conall Cael 
   |                                  |  both died 658 & 654
   |                                  |
   |                                  ~
   |                                  |
   |                                  Gallchobar
   |                           (Clann Ua Gallchobair)
   |
   |___________________________________________________________
   |       
   |             
   Óengus, died 650 
   |
   |Further Cenél Conaill.

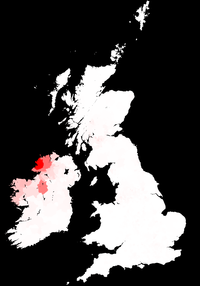
Gallaghers in Ireland

== History ==
The O'Gallagher clan hails from the Irish baronies of Tír Aodha/Tír Hugh ("land of Hugh") and Raphoe, in the east of County Donegal, Ireland, in which Ballybeit and Ballynaglack served as seats of their power. They were anciently chiefs of Cenél Aedha (the descendants of Áed mac Ainmuireach) and of the larger Cenél Conaill.

One modern and therefore apocryphal origin story is that the original person, being a courageous and charitable person, went to the assistance of the crew of the first Viking ship to arrive off the Irish coast and whose ship was wrecked off the coast of County Donegal, where he was the local chieftain. He having first saved them and then cared for them, they eventually returned to their homeland, only to return soon after with the first raiding party. Hence it is argued he was given the name ("Gall" means stranger or foreigner in modern Irish and the ending "cubhair" and "cobhair" which for the purpose of this story is said to be derived from "cabhair" in modern Irish meaning help or helper). Whatever the derivation of his name (see reference to O' Clery's Glossary above giving the derivation as Gal+acobhar 'ambition of valour'), Gallchobhar was the one given the role of founding father of the clan at the advent of surname use in Ireland in around the 10th century. The earliest recorded incidence of the name in a fragment of a manuscript presently in the Royal Library of Brussels is "Gallchubhair". A similarly earlier mention occurs in the Annals of the Four Masters, where it is recorded that Mael Cobo Úi Gallchobhar, abbot of Scrin Adamnain, died in 1022 AD.

The family's origins are with the chieftain Aodh, a name corresponding to the English Hugh (whence Tirhugh), a lineal descendant of Conall Gulban son of 5th-century high king and warlord Niall Noígíallach, known in English as Niall of the Nine Hostages, who is reputed to have brought St Patrick to Ireland as a slave. Aodh established his dúnarus fort building or residence at a place corresponding to the present-day townland of Glassbolie in Tirhugh. The chieftains of his line ruled in relative peace for several generations until the beginning of the Viking invasion of Ireland in the 9th century. The ruling chieftain of the time, whose real name is not recorded, was almost certainly obliged to come to some accommodation with the foreign invader resulting in the nickname "Gallcóbhair" which has been applied to his descendants thereafter.

It would appear that the previously obscure Cenél Lugdach forged multiple matrimonial alliances with the local Viking leadership, and not the Gallchobair of the Cenél Aedha who existed before the arrival of the Vikings in the 800s, the Cenél Lugdach are descended from Lugaid mac Sétnai, one of the great-grandsons of Conall Gulban. In contrast to the Gallchobair who are descended from his brother and the first born son Ainmuire mac Sétnai. The Cenél Lugdach tribal territory extended from Dobhar (Gweedore) to the river Suilidhe (Swilly) in Donegal. From this clan descend the Cenél Conaill surnames of O'Doherty, and O'Donnell.

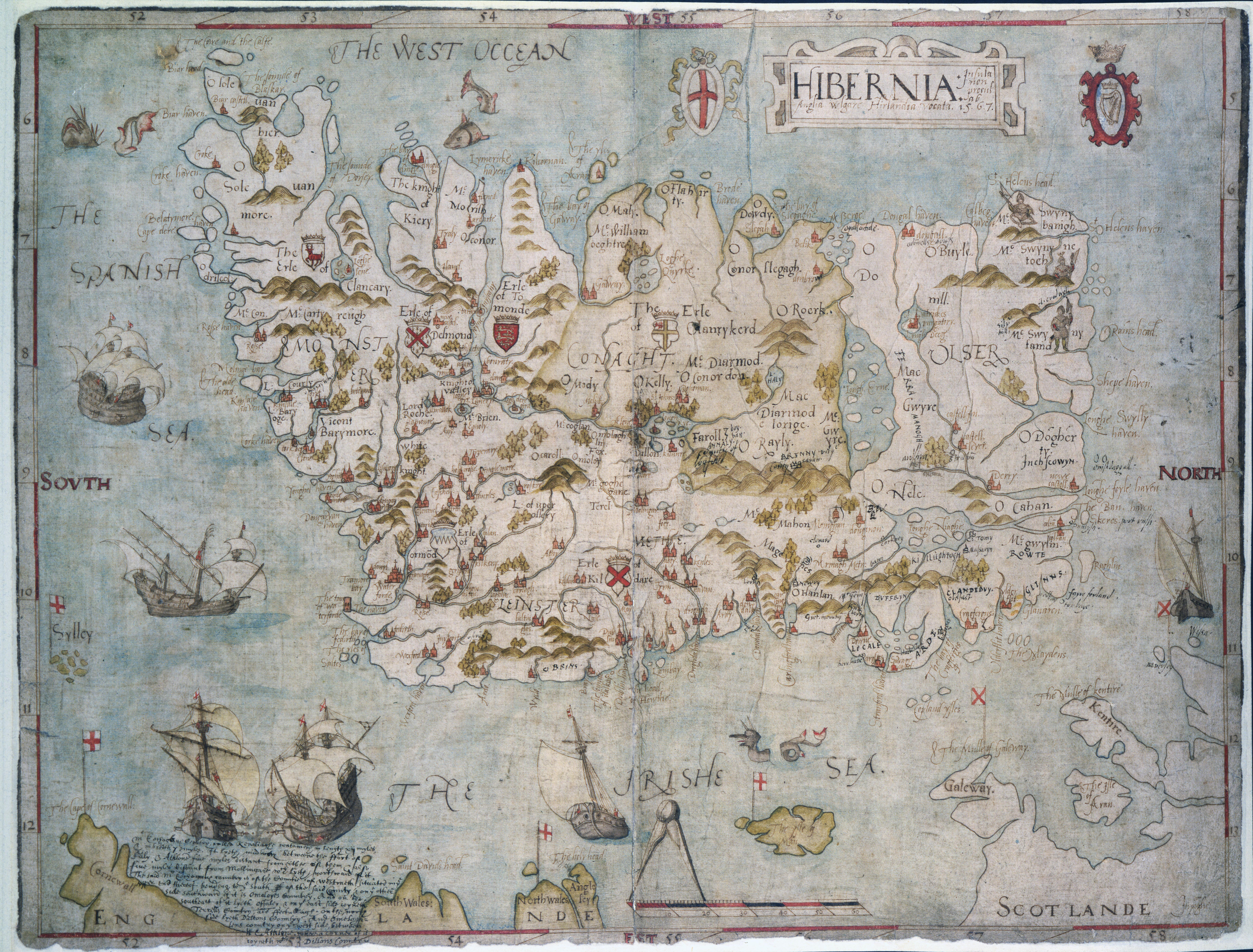
Map of Ireland by John Goghe, 1567

The modern surname system began c. 900, but wasn't adopted in its entirety until about 1100. Despite the legend that Brian Boru was somehow responsible for the widespread implementation of this naming system, the custom may have developed of its own accord as the Irish population grew in size.

The Ó Gallchobhair sept claims to be the most senior family of the Cenél Conaill as Gallchobar was descended from Conall Gulban. The sept's territory was spread across the areas within the modern baronies of Raphoe and Tirhugh in County Donegal. From the 14th century until the 16th century, the sept's chiefs were marshals of the O'Donnell cavalry in the O'Donnell Lucht Tighe. The principal branch of the family was centred at Ballybeit and Ballynaglack. Although generally aligned with the O'Donnells during the period, a renegade band of Gallaghers helped their rival, Shane O'Neill, escape after the Battle of Fearsaid Suili in 1567.

=== 16th century Tudor-era ===
In the 16th century, the Ó Gallchobairs also opposed the Ó Donnells for a short time for religious reasons after King Henry VIII of England declared himself King of Ireland and head of the church in the Tudor conquest of Ireland beginning in 1541. To maintain their lands and power, the Ó Donnell Lord of Tír Conaill, was forced to recognise Henry VIII as King of Ireland, leader of the Irish Church and had to defend the new English religion from anyone who would advocate papal authority. As a result, the Ó Donnells supported Bishop O'Kane over Edmond O'Gallagher. O'Gallagher was never accepted as bishop, and he died mysteriously in 1543. The O'Gallagher clan then seized the Ó Donnell Lifford Castle in retaliation, for about a year.

With the death of Edmond, the Pope appointed another Gallagher as Bishop of Raphoe in his place, although this bishop was not capable of assuming this position until the arrival of the English queen Mary, who restored Roman Catholicism as the state religion in 1553. It appears that, with the death of the subservient Ó Donnell lord, the practice of Catholicism was left to continue peacefully in Tír Conaill, at least up to the end of the Nine Years' War (c. 1594) and the British Plantation of Ulster (1606).

Redmond O'Gallagher was appointed Bishop of Killala by Pope Paul III in 1545 and presumably was recognised by the Crown in the reign of Queen Mary I, but there is no record of his recognition by Queen Elizabeth I. In 1569, Redmond O'Gallagher was appointed Bishop of Derry. He died in office on 15 March 1601. Donat O'Gallagher, OFM succeeded Redmond as Bishop of Killala in 1570. In 1580, Donat was appointed Bishop of Down and Connor and died in office in 1581.

=== 17th century and the Flight of the Earls ===
In the Annals of the Four Masters, on 14 September 1607, mention by Tadhg Ó Cianáin is made of five Gallaghers named Cathaoir (mac Toimlin), Cathaoir (mac Airt), Toirleach Corrach, Tuathal and Aodh Og, who accompanied the O'Donnell 'Earls', as they fled Ireland. They stayed in Belgium and joined the O'Neill regiment in the Spanish Army of Flanders. The regiment fought against the Dutch during the Eighty Years' War. Aodh Ó Gallchobhair and his wife (mentor and nursemaid of O'Donnell sons) chose to travel with the O'Donnells to Rome.

Michael Gallagher was the first to arrive in North America as a merchant fur trader, in the year 1750.

=== 18th to 19th century under the British Act of Union ===
Captain Gallagher (died 1818) was an Irish highwayman who, as one of the later Irish rapparees (guerrillas), led a bandit group in the hills of the Irish countryside, armed with the Blunderbuss of the day, during the late 18th and early 19th centuries.

Born in Bonniconlon, County Mayo into a family originally from County Donegal, he lived with his aunt in Derryronane, Swinford, for much of his early life and was raised near the woods of Barnalyra (roughly the location of modern-day Ireland West Airport). As he reached early adulthood, he and a group of others began raiding mail coaches as well as wealthy landowners and travellers throughout eastern Mayo and parts of southern County Sligo and western County Roscommon.

His attacks on landowners were especially widely known and, in one reported incident, Gallagher and his men raided the home of an extremely unpopular landlord in Killasser and forced him to eat half a dozen eviction notices he had recently drawn up for nearly half a dozen tenant farmers before escaping with silver and other valuables.

Although successfully evading British patrols for some time, he was finally apprehended by authorities in the parish of Coolcarney (or possibly Attymass) near the foothills of the Ox Mountains while recovering from an illness at a friend's home during Christmas.

He had been informed on by a neighbour whom Gallagher had formerly helped after sending a message of Gallagher's whereabouts to the British commanding officer at Foxford. Immediately sending for reinforcements from Ballina, Castlebar and Swinford, a force of 200 redcoats were sent after Gallagher and, upon their arrival, proceeded to surround the home where the highwayman had been staying. Gallagher, by then in poor health and not wishing to endanger his host or his family, surrendered to the British. Taken back to Foxford, he was tried and convicted before being taken to Castlebar, where he was executed.

Shortly before his execution, he had claimed to the British commanding officer that his treasure had been hidden under a rock in the woods of Barnalyra. After Gallagher's execution, the officer quickly led several cavalryman to Barnalyra who discovered there were thousands of rocks in the wood, upon a long search of all the rocks within the area, they reportedly only recovered a jewel hilted sword. It has been speculated that Gallagher may have been hoping to lead them to the site in the hopes his men would be able to rescue him from their hideout near the Derryronane-Curryane border although the treasure was never recovered.

=== Irish war of Independence ===
Cork Free Press's Frank Gallagher, hired by William O'Brien of the political party, the All-for-Ireland League, was a prominent Sinn Féin supporter in the press. However, the paper was censored and suppressed in 1916 after Frank, as its republican editor, accused the British authorities of lying about the conditions and situation of republican prisoners in Frongoch internment camp. In December 1931, Gallagher now at The Irish Press, was prosecuted by the Irish Free State military tribunal for publishing Seditious libel, articles alleging that Gardaí had mistreated the opponents (Anti-Treaty republicans) of the Irish Free State government. This was facilitated by Amendment No. 17 of Constitution of the Irish Free State and Gallagher was convicted and fined £50. Frank is most well known for penning Four Glorious Years 1918–1921 and becoming the deputy director of the First Dáil's Department of Publicity in March 1921, assisting his colleague Erskine Childers, and together they published the Irish Bulletin. In 1965 his book The Anglo-Irish Treaty was published posthumously. In 1974 The indivisible island: the history of the partition of Ireland was to be his last published, again posthumously.

Harry Gallagher and his wife Eileen Gallagher were the founders of Urney Chocolates. Their son was Redmond Gallagher, an Irish nationalist, racing driver and businessman who was introduced to Adolf Hitler in 1934.

== Arms ==
The Gallagher coat of arms displays a black lion rampant on a silver shield, treading on a green snake surrounded by eight green trefoils. The correct heraldic blazon is "Argent, a lion rampant Sable, treading on a serpent in fess Proper, between eight trefoils Vert." The crest which surmounts the helmet over the shield depicts a red crescent surrounding a green snake or, to give its heraldic definition, "A crescent gules out of the horns a serpent erect proper". The motto of the clan in Latin is Mea Gloria Fides ("The Faith is My Glory"). While in Irish it is Buaidh nó Bás ("Victory or death").

== See also ==
- Gallagher (surname)
- List of Irish clans in Ulster
- Northern Uí Néill
- Branches of the Cenél Conaill
- Gaelic nobility of Ireland
- O'Donnell dynasty
- O'Doherty family
- Dubgaill and Finngaill
