= Helen O'Clery =

Irish writer

- Born: 1910; Stranorlar, County Donegal
- Died: 11 October 2006 (aged 95–96); Knocklyon
- Occupation: Writer

Helen O'Clery (née Gallagher) (1910 – 11 October 2006) was an Irish writer specializing in children's books.

== Early life ==
O'Clery was born as Helen Gallagher in Stranorlar, County Donegal, the middle child of three born to Henry Thomas Gallagher and Eileen Cullen Gallagher. Her father was Crown Solicitor for County Donegal. Her mother came from County Wexford. Her mother started several small industries to employ local girls and Belgian refugees. A confectionery proved very successful. Her father joined her mother in the business, and they established Urney Chocolates in Dublin; it developed into one of the largest confectionery manufacturers in Europe.

Helen Gallagher attended schools in Dublin and France, and trained as a nurse at St Vincent's Hospital in Stephen's Green.

== Career ==
O'Clery was trained as a nurse and a physiotherapist, but she wrote children's books while she was at home raising her five children. Her writing was a family business: some of her books were illustrated by her elder daughter Ann, and her manuscripts were typed by her sister-in-law, Una Coonan. Her Pegasus books included maps drawn by her son Edward.

O'Clery also took an intense interest in Irish pre-history and archaeo-astronomy, studying and surveying the stone circle at Athgreany, near Hollywood, County Wicklow, and photographing them especially at each solstice and equinox. She published her research as Athgreany Stone Circle: The Stones of Time (1990) and later as Zodiacal Archetypes in Celtic Myths (1992).

== Bibliography ==
- Sparks Fly (Collins, London, 1948)
- Spring Show (Collins, London, 1949)
- Swiss Adventure (Collins, London, 1951)
- The Mystery of Black Sod Point (Franklin Watts, Inc. New York, 1959)
- The Mystery of the Phantom Ship (Franklin Watts. Inc., New York, 1961)
- Mysterious Waterway (Allen Figgis, Dublin, 1963)
- Rebel Sea Queen (Franklin Watts, New York, 1965)
- The Pegasus Book of Ireland (Dennis Dobson, London, 1967)
- The Pegasus Book of Egypt (Dennis Dobson, London, 1968)
- The Pegasus Book of the Nile (Dennis Dobson, London, 1970)
- The Pegasus Story of Atlantis (Dennis Dobson, London, 1971)
- The Pegasus Book of East Africa (Dennis Dobson, London, 1972)
- Athgreany Stone Circle: The Stones of Time (Al Morrison, New York, 1990)
- Zodiacal Archetypes in Celtic Myths (Al Morrison, New York, 1992)

=== Edited readers ===
Helen O'Clery also compiled and edited readers, including The Ireland Reader (1963), The Mermaid Reader (1964), and Queens, Queens, Queens (1965).

== Personal life ==
In 1936, Helen Gallagher married Dermot O'Clery, a civil and mechanical engineer who later taught at Trinity College Dublin. They lived at Tallaght, in County Dublin and had five children, Ann, Henry, Peter, Edward and Eliza. Helen O'Clery was widowed in 1977, and she died in 2006, aged 96 years, while living with her daughter in Knocklyon. There is a collection of her manuscripts in the de Grummond Children's Literature Collection at the University of Southern Mississippi.
