= José Scaron =

French racing driver (1895 1975)

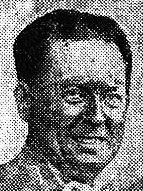
- In 1931
- Born: Joseph Charles Paul Scaron; 19 April 1895 Brussels, Belgium
- Died: 17 July 1975 (aged 80) Neuilly. France

Joseph Charles Paul "José" Scaron (19 April 1895 – 17 July 1975) was a French racing driver, mostly active before the Second World War.

== Career ==
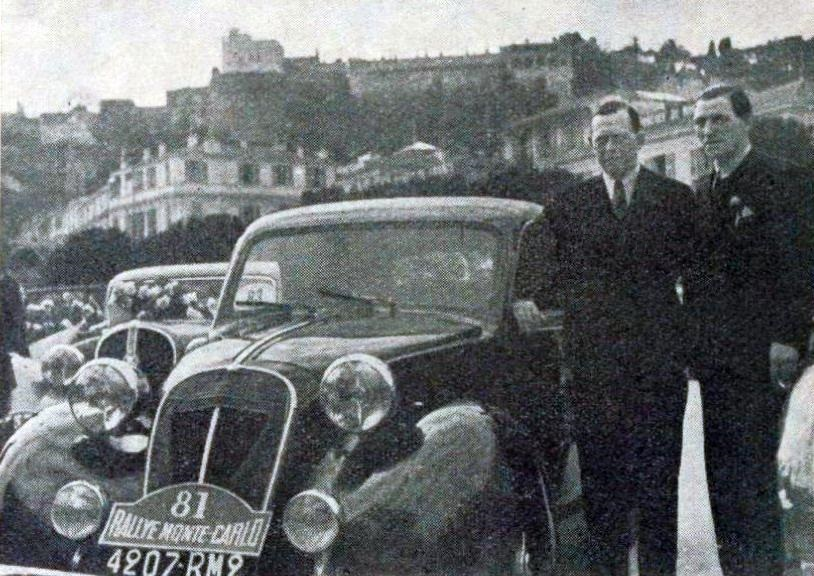
With Amédée Gordini (right) and the Simca 8 with which they won their class at Monte Carlo 1939

Scaron was born in Brussels, but became a French citizen and served in the French Army in the First World War. After the armistice, he became an Amilcar dealer in Le Havre, and from 1922 undertook a racing campaign; he raced (conflict permitting) over the next 30 years.

In 1928, he started to use an Amilcar C6, and with it he won the voiturette class in the 1928 Grand Prix de la Marne. The following year, after the closure of the Amilcar competition department, he took over an ex-works 1,100cc Amilcar MCO, and with it won the 1929 Antibes, Lyon, Tunis, and Dieppe Grands Prix, the 1930 Comminges Grand Prix, and 1931 Monza Grand Prix voiturette classes. The Amilcar factory offered him support with maintenance and spare parts, but did not go so far as to pay or sponsor him officially. Scaron's sole national Grand Prix was the 1932 German Grand Prix, again in the voiturette class (run concurrently with the main race, over a shorter distance), in which he finished 7th.

In 1934, with the Amilcar marque winding up, Scaron attempted Grands Prix in an Alfa Romeo Monza, and took part in a handful of minor races without success. In 1938 he took on the Simca dealership in Le Havre, and started racing Simca sportscars, as well as winning his class in the 1939 Monte Carlo Rally. At the 1939 24 Hours of Le Mans, driving Amédée Gordini's new streamlined "Huit", he and Gordini won the Rudge-Whitworth Cup, the Index of Performance, and the 1,100cc class; it was Scaron's only finish in the race.

=== After World War 2 ===
Scaron took part in a handful of national Grands Prix in 1947, in a Talbot-Lago 150C, his best result being 5th at Reims. His sole official Formula 1 race was at the 1948 Pau Grand Prix, sharing a Simca-Gordini with Prince Bira, but retiring.

He had greater successes in sportscar racing, twice winning the Bol d'Or in a Simca, in 1948 and 1951; he won his class in the 1950 Monte Carlo Rally, and finished third (with Pierre Veyron) at the 24 Hours of Spa in 1948. His final race of note was the 1953 Tour de France in a Simca Aronde, retiring at Strasbourg.

Scaron continued with his dealership after stepping back from racing, and was awarded the Legion d'Honneur in 1954.

== Le Mans results ==
Year	Team	Co-Drivers	Car	Class	Laps	Pos.	Class Pos.
1938	(France) Automobiles Gordini	(France) Amédée Gordini	Simca 8	1.5	140	DNF (Lack of oil)	
1939	(France) Automobiles Gordini	(France) Amédée Gordini	Simca 8-FIAT	1.1	214	10th	1st
1949	(France) Automobiles Gordini	(France) Pierre Veyron	Simca-Gordini T8	1.1	88	DNF (Transmission)	
1950	(France) Automobiles Gordini	(France) René Pascal	Simca-Gordini T15S	1.1	77	DNF (Engine)	
1951	(France) Equipe Gordini	(France) Aldo Gordini	Simca-Gordini T15S	1.5	77	DNF (Refuelling)	
1952	(France) Mécanorma	(France) Norbert Jean Mahé	Simca-Gordini T11 MM	1.1	4	DNF (Radiator)	
