= Eileen Gallagher =

Irish businesswoman

- Born: Helen Mary Cullen; 9 September 1887; Rosbercon, County Wexford, Ireland
- Died: 8 October 1976 (aged 89); Urney House, Tallaght, County Dublin
- Occupation: businesswoman
- Spouse: Harry Gallagher
- Children: 3, including Redmond
- Relatives: John Redmond (uncle)

Eileen Gallagher (born Helen Mary Cullen; 9 September 1887 - 8 October 1976) was an Irish businesswoman who founded Urney Chocolates with her husband Harry Gallagher. She is believed to have been the first woman to work as a commercial sales representative in Ireland.

== Early life and family ==
Eileen Gallagher was born Helen Mary Cullen on 9 September 1887 in Rosbercon, outside New Ross, County Wexford. Her parents were John Baptist and Mary Ellen Cullen (née Redmond). She was the youngest of 16 children. Her paternal uncle was Fr James Cullen, the founder of the Pioneer Total Abstinence Association. Her mother was a younger sister of John Redmond. The family were wealthy, but owing to her father's obsession with organ playing, he spent his inherited wealth. The family moved to a smaller home at Kenilworth Square, Dublin, and her mother supported the family by becoming a seamstress. She married Henry Gallagher in 1906, and the couple went to live at Dunwiley House, Stranorlar, County Donegal. They had three children, Edward, who became a surgeon in England, Helen, who went on to become a children's author, and Redmond, who was a businessman and motor-racing enthusiast.

== Career ==
The Gallaghers bought a large former Church of Ireland rectory on five acres in Urney in 1918. From there Gallagher started a market garden to create employment, as the area was suffering from high rates of emigration. Her first output was gathering bundles of snowdrops and ivy leaves to export to Covent Garden, London, which later developed into a fruit farm. The produce was sold fresh or in bottles. Due to rationing, Gallagher was unable to source enough sugar to make jam, so she applied for a jam-making sugar quota from the government in 1919. Having been denied that application, she was offered a sugar quota to make chocolate. She had no previous experience in making sweets, but accepted the quota and experimented successfully in her kitchen. The Gallaghers attended the Glasgow Confectionery Exhibition in 1920, and consulted with an owner of a Dundee sweet factory on machinery. They purchased machinery for their small chocolate factory and determined they would produce assorted chocolates using a Dutch technique known as couverture. They hired a Dutch expert to train the employees, and incorporated as Urney Chocolates Ltd. The company had 40 employees by 1924.

Gallagher was the company's first commercial traveller, and is believed to be the first woman in Ireland to undertake such a position. In the beginning, her male contemporaries ostracised her, but she eventually won a number of them over. She developed relationships with shopkeepers across Ireland which formed a solid customer base for their company. During the Anglo-Irish war of 1919 to 1921 and the subsequent Civil War from 1922 to 1923, travelling in Ireland was hazardous, resulting in Gallagher needing two passes to travel, one for Free State roadblocks, and the second for Republican ones. After the destruction of a bridge in Dingle, Gallagher had to wade across a river and be given a lift into town on a manure cart. Following an ambush in Castleisland, she witnessed a mound of corpses.

The Gallaghers' company was the only chocolate manufacturer based in Ireland, but due to its Irish nature was not popular in what would become Northern Ireland. When Ireland was partitioned to create the Irish Free State, the new border was at the end of their garden. Their business was greatly impacted by the two new jurisdictions, with difficult new customs regulations and disruption to transport across the new border. The Urney factory was gutted by fire twice, first in March 1921, and then in February 1924. In 1924, the Irish Free State had imposed duties on imported confectionery, so Gallaghers decided to use the insurance money to move the factory further south in the Irish Free State. At first, no Irish banks would lend the Gallaghers money, so they resolved to emigrate to Canada. Before this, her husband lobbied W. T. Cosgrave, the Irish head of government, for support. Cosgrave wanted to nurture Irish enterprise, and arranged a loan and lease of a decommissioned British aerodrome at Tallaght, County Dublin, which the Gallaghers later bought. Though she remained active in the business, after the relocation, her husband largely took over the running of the business.

== Later life and death ==
Gallagher remained active on the farm and gardens of Urney House, founding a poultry farm and growing pears. She introduced the White Holland turkey into Ireland in 1950, when she smuggled some fertilised eggs through customs on her return from the United States. They birds became a popular choice for Christmas dinners, and at the farm's peak in the mid 1950s, it was producing 3,000 birds a year.

Gallagher died in Urney House on 8 October 1976, and was buried with her husband at St Maelruan's churchyard, Tallaght.
