= Henry Thomas Gallagher =

Irish businessman

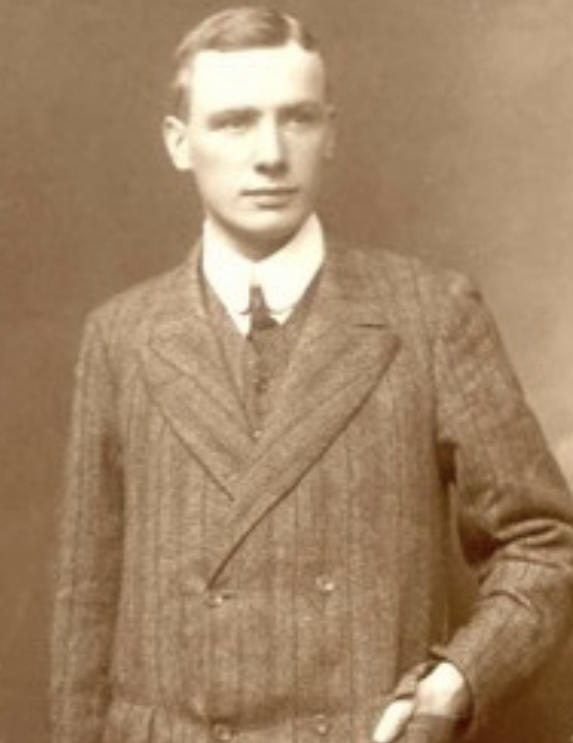
- Gallagher, photographed c. 1910
- Born: Henry Thomas Gallagher; 13 April 1880; Strabane, County Tyrone, Ireland
- Died: 15 March 1975 (aged 94); Tallaght, Dublin, Ireland
- Occupations: Solicitor, businessman
- Spouse: Eileen Cullen (m. 1906)
- Children: 3, including Redmond
- Relatives: Gallagher family

Henry Thomas Gallagher JP (13 April 1880 – 15 March 1975) was an Irish businessman, lawyer and founder of Urney Chocolates, a leading confectionery company of the 20th century.

== Early life ==
Henry Thomas Gallagher was born in Strabane, County Tyrone on 13 April 1880. He was the third son of Edward Gallagher JP, DL (1839–1924), a prominent businessman and political figure in Strabane. His mother, Harriet (Anne) Thomas, was a milliner from County Tipperary, reputedly of a Quaker background.

Gallagher attended Castleknock College, Dublin. He then worked in the family factory for a year before being sent to study law in Dublin. He was admitted to the Incorporated Law Society of Ireland in 1902, and returned to Strabane to enter practice.

=== Family ===
In 1906, Gallagher married Eileen Cullen, the daughter of John Baptist Cullen, Esq., and Mary Redmond, a cousin of John Redmond. The Gallaghers went to live at Dunwiley House, near Stranorlar, County Donegal. They had three children, including Helen, a children's author, and Redmond, a motor-racing driver and eventual chairman of Urney.

== Career ==
Gallagher was a leading recruiter in County Donegal for the British Army during World War I. He was an outspoken critic of the nationalist party leaders' failure to rally their supporters to the British cause and branded Sinn Féin supporters cowards for not enlisting. Due to his training as a solicitor, he was particularly involved in the revising sessions which sought to have unionist voters eliminated from the electoral register and nationalist voters retained or placed on the register. He worked to oppose unionists trying to do the opposite. In November 1915, he was appointed crown solicitor for County Donegal. When military tribunals took the place of court proceedings in the period 1919 to 1921, Gallagher was spared from such cases.

=== Founding Urney ===
The Gallaghers bought a large former Church of Ireland rectory on five acres in Urney in 1918. From there, his wife started a market garden to create employment, as the area was suffering from high rates of emigration. Her first output was gathering bundles of snowdrops and ivy leaves to export to Covent Garden, London, which later developed into a fruit farm. The produce was sold fresh or in bottles. Having unsuccessfully applied for a sugar quota for jam making, she was offered a sugar quota to make chocolate. The Gallaghers accepted, attending the Glasgow Confectionery Exhibition in 1920, and consulted with an owner of a Dundee sweet factory on machinery. They purchased machinery for a small chocolate factory and determined they would produce assorted chocolates using a Dutch technique known as couverture. They hired a Dutch expert to train the employees, and incorporated as Urney Chocolates Ltd. The company had 40 employees by 1924. His wife worked as the company's first commercial traveller, developing a client base for the new company.

Gallagher lost his position as crown solicitor in January 1923 when the Irish Free State dismissed all such solicitors. He petitioned the Irish State for compensation for loss of office as a prominent nationalist, and the British State for similar compensation, claiming to be "a loyalist in distress"; he was successful in both. He maintained a practice, but became more engaged in the running of the factory and eventually retired from legal practice to focus on the business. The Gallaghers' company was the only chocolate manufacturer based in Ireland, which led to it not being popular in what would become Northern Ireland. When Ireland was partitioned, the new Irish border was at the end of their garden. Their business was greatly impacted by the two new jurisdictions, with difficult new customs regulations and disruption to transport across the new border. The Urney factory was destroyed by fire twice, first in March 1921, and then again in February 1924. In 1924, the Irish Free State had imposed duties on imported confectionery, so the Gallaghers wanted to use this insurance money to move the company further south. At first, no Irish banks would lend them further funds, so the Gallaghers resolved to emigrate to Canada. Before this, Gallagher lobbied W. T. Cosgrave, the Irish head of government, for support. Cosgrave wanted to develop Irish enterprise, and arranged a loan and lease of a decommissioned British aerodrome at Tallaght, County Dublin, which the Gallaghers later bought.

The factory and the Gallaghers relocated with 20 employees from Urney to Tallaght in summer 1924 and opened the new factory in November. Gallagher oversaw the production, while Eileen took care of the administration and development of the packaging facility. There was a competitive nature to the couple's relationship and she remained active in the business, but Gallagher largely took over running the company. The couple lived beside the factory in Urney House. Gallagher was a progressive employer, paying his employees well, providing recreational facilities and uniforms. He stressed the importance of a clean and caring environment, capitalising on Tallaght's rural location. He refurbished the barracks into a garden, which became a popular attraction for visitors from Dublin. Gallagher invoked the 1891 papal encyclical, Rerum novarum, which advocated for a Catholic ethos in industry. He was critical of other Irish Catholic businessmen who did not draw their faith into their business and instead oversaw "sweating" labour in poor factory conditions. Although, he was probably influenced by the Cadbury family and their business, the Cadburys were Quakers. Urney Chocolates enjoyed a favourable economic market in Ireland, particularly in comparison to their British contemporaries.

Gallagher lobbied the Cumann na nGaedheal government to protect the Irish chocolate industry, and was initially shrugged off by Patrick McGilligan, the minister for industry and commerce. He had greater success cultivating a friendship with Éamon de Valera, who favoured protectionist economic policies. This relationship resulted in Gallagher being appointed a director of what would become The Irish Press newspaper in December 1927. He was a member of the Knights of Columbanus, but probably owing to de Valera's distrust of the Knights, he left the society. When Fianna Fáil entered government in 1932, Urney Chocolates benefited hugely from the elimination of chocolate imports, but Cadbury and Rowntree circumvented this by establishing Irish subsidiaries. Gallagher worked closely with Seán Lemass, using Urney Chocolates as an example of how Irish industry could benefit from protectionist policies. McGilligan criticised their products as poor imitations of British chocolate products, citing their inferior products as proof of the failure of protectionism.

Gallagher was a leading Irish advocate for social credit, arguing that the Irish government needed to invest capital in Ireland to generate a technically developed and sustainable Irish manufacturing base. He argued for the declaration of Irish monetary independence and a break from the Bank of England with the Irish State taking over the Irish banking sector. This would allow for the extension of credit to Irish industry, which Gallagher had experienced was not forthcoming for Irish businesses from British banks. He asserted that Irish industry would never develop so long as Irish banking was still integrated with the British system. His business and political contemporaries did not share his views. When it became clear that de Valera was not persuaded, Gallagher stopped his lobbying. Disillusioned by the lack of support for monetary reform, from the 1950s he began to withdraw some of the facilities he developed for his employees, and instead allowed their use by his grandchildren.

The company had prospered during The Emergency from 1940 to 1945, being granted an extra sugar quota. This allowed Gallagher to illegally export sugar at huge profits to Britain. He evaded many of the profit and price controls. When his source of West African cocoa beans was cut off during World War II, as chairman-director of the Chocolate Manufacturers Association, and its only Irish member, he arranged new supplies from Canada and Brazil for glucose and cocoa. During this period, with no other market competitors, demand for Urney Chocolates grew hugely. Despite difficulties in sourcing machinery from Europe, they were able to continue and expand production using secondhand machines with modification. They suffered a marked decline in their market share after the war, when imports of chocolate resumed, but continued to supply the British market which was struggling to recover in the post-war period.

== Later life and death ==
Gallagher retired as managing director of Urney Chocolates in 1950, but continued to serve as chairman until 1958. Based on his success, the family maintained a large staff at Urney House. On his farm he bred cattle as well as hunting and show horses. He had started breeding racehorses, with John Oxx training his yearlings. In 1962, his horse Aithne won three races. The Gallaghers were disappointed when their son Redmond sold the Gallagher stake in Urney Chocolates in 1963, seeing the company taken over by foreign owners.

Gallagher died at Urney House on 15 March 1975, and was buried at Tallaght.
