= Hadji Bey =

Irish maker of Turkish delights

Hadji Bey is a Turkish delight confectionery that was originally produced in Cork and has since moved to a production site in County Kildare, Ireland with the successor to Urney Chocolates.

== History ==
The original product was created by Harutun and Esther Batmazian, an Armenian trader and his wife, who arrived in Cork in 1902 after fleeing pogroms in the Ottoman Empire. They exhibited their confections at the Great Cork International Exhibition that year. The business was established in Cork city where it thrived, although after WWI there was an incident with the premises being burned. It is assumed this occurred when soldiers returning from the Gallipoli offensive mistook the family for Turks. Batmazian moved the shop from Lower Glanmire Road to McCurtain Street and set about explaining the family heritage to the local people. A different incident, or a different version of the same event, is given by the company in their leaflet THE STORY OF HADJI BEY Chapter 2 'Armenian Delight'. In this version the shop was already in McCurtain Street in 1915, when a soldier entered the shop and insulted Esther, assuming that she and her husband were Turkish. No fire is mentioned. The incident led to Harutun producing a leaflet emphasising his Armenian origins.

The sweet became a regional favourite. The business exported its confections to Harrods in London and Bloomingdale's in New York, and their confectionery was even supplied to Buckingham Palace.

The Batmazian shop façade on McCurtain Street read: Hadji Bey et Cie, giving the premises an exotic, international, quasi-French atmosphere.

== Today ==
Esther Batmazian died in the 1940s and her husband left Cork, moving to the United States. Their son Eddie Batmazian ran the business until he retired in 1970, after which it began to decline. By 2010 the product was bought and made by UHC Confectionery in Newbridge, while keeping a sales premises at the English Market in Cork.
