= Sagra, Spain =

Village in Alicante, Spain

Coordinates: 38°48′39″N 0°03′56″W

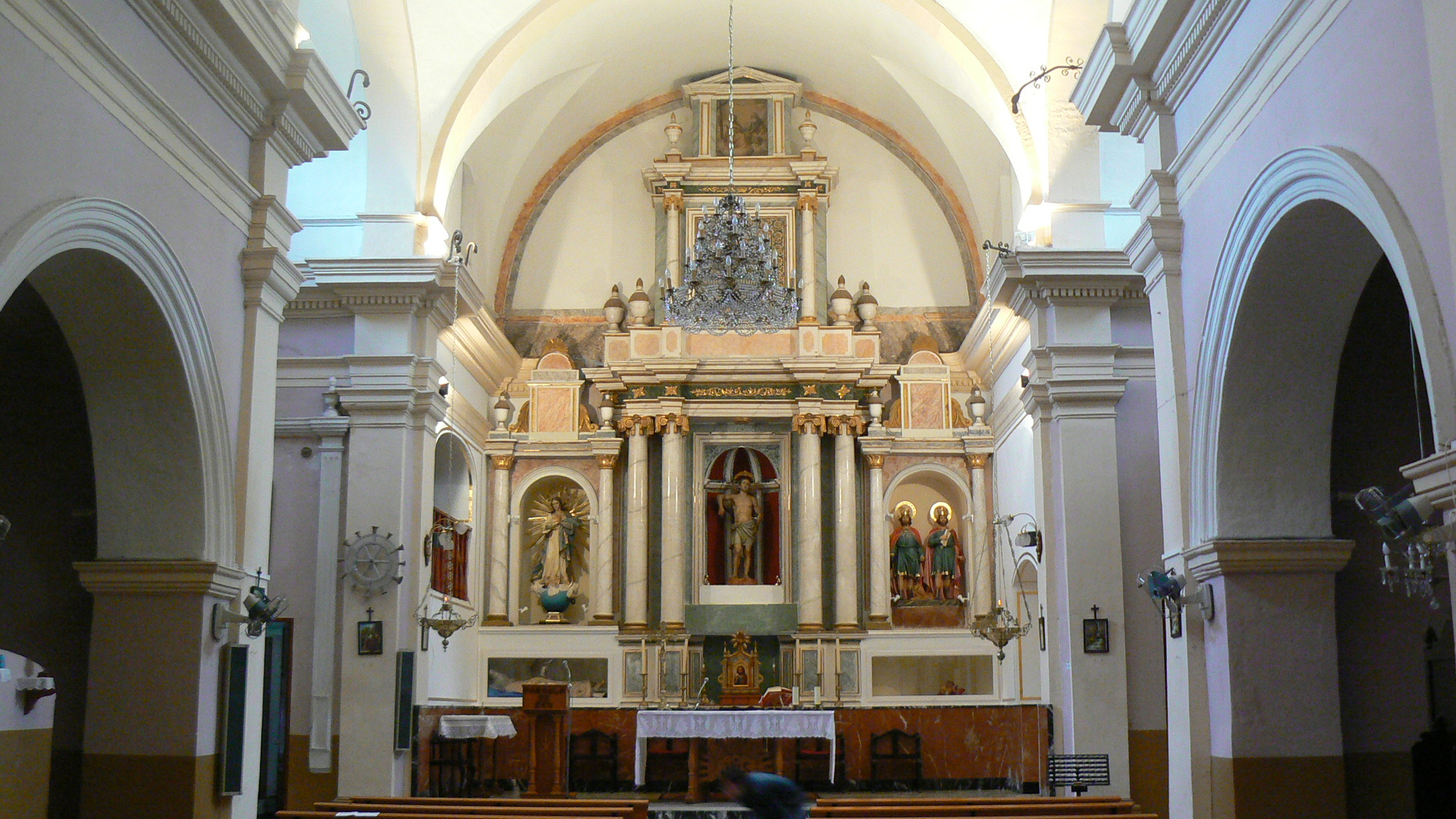

Sagra's coat of arms

Sagra is a village in the province of Alicante and autonomous community of Valencia, Spain. The municipality covers an area of 5.6 square kilometres (2.2 sq mi) and as of 2011 had a population of 454 people.

== Geography ==
Sagra is one of the 33 towns that make up the region of the Marina Alta, north of the province of Alicante. With an area of 5.62 km^{2}, it is located not far from the sea in the valley of La Rectoría traced by the river Girona in its slow flow towards the sea of the old Marquesado de Denia.

Cabal "Caval" or Peña de Migdia (596 masl), (which separates it from the municipality of Pego; to the north, there is the abrupt sector of the port of Sagra (Pego road), which includes the rough area of the Penya Roja), the Mortit, the Sierra de Segaria of 508 m. Mountains that are part of the mountainous system of the Betica mountain range that starts in Gibraltar in the Gulf of Cádiz, reaching the province of Alicante where it disappears into the Mediterranean after Montgó, Denia, Cabo de la Nao de Javea and Peñón de Ifach in Calpe, re-emerging again in the Pitiusas Islands of the Balearic archipelago after about 45 nautical miles.

Sagra is at a crossroads, on the Pego-Callosa road, since it is the entrance to the towns of the Rectory and Ondara. Sagra is at a crossroads, on the Pego-Callosa road, since it is the entrance to the towns of the Rectory and Ondara.

== History ==
Ancient Islamic farmhouse that belonged to Juan Pérez de Cullera, during the first half of the 13th century it was bought by Eximén Pérez de Tarazona, and confirmed by the King in 1249. In 1286 it belonged to Pedro Jiménez de Ayerbe, and in 1299 he obtained it Raimundo Vilanova donation.

In 1341 it was acquired by the Order of Santiago, who built a palace and established the encomienda de Sagra. The term "Catalan language" is documented for the first time in Sagra's letter of assignment to said order, signed by the Valencian notary Bernat de Soler.

In 1341 it was acquired by the Order of Santiago, who built a palace and established the encomienda de Sagra. The term "Catalan language" is documented for the first time in Sagra's letter of assignment to said order, signed by the Valencian notary Bernat de Soler. 6 In the parish settlement of 1535, Sagra was annexed to Ràfol de Almunia, and in the time of San Juan de Ribera, it became a parish, giving it the same Ráfol de Almunia, Tormos, Benimeli and Sanet y Negrals as annexes, then counting with 16 houses of new Christians. 7

Sagra is closely related to the historical vicissitudes of its neighboring towns that make up the La Rectoría sub-region. Populations that were inhabited among others by: Iberians, Celts, Phoenicians, Greeks, Carthaginians, Romans, Goths or Visigoths until the Muslim occupation, an event that was a decisive event in our history, leaving the doors of Spain open for centuries to immigrants from the Semitic peoples of North Africa. Being the place of Sagra in possession of the Order of Santiago, in order to comply with the mandates established in the repopulation, in 1610 the town was repopulated according to the document or letter of the town signed on February 7. This Puebla Charter would be renegotiated again later, a second being signed on January 7, 1611 by D. Jerónimo Ferrer, and a third was finally released on March 5, 1613 by King Felipe III. As detailed in the first Letter of Repopulation of Sagra, it is granted on February 7, 1610 by D. Pedro de Guzmán y de Rivera, commander of the towns of Pozorubio, Sagra and Sanet, - Attorney General of the Order of Santiago, Corregidor of Madrid and first Stable of the Queen Dª. Margarita de Austria since April 19, 1609 and Dª. Isabel de Vivanco y Lara, Lady of the Mayorazgo de Valtierra–. In it, the places of Sagra and Sanet are awarded jointly in the same sheet. Noting that Sagra is repopulated by:

Martín Hernández, Mateo de Raqueno, Gabriel Serrano, Simeón Carrasco and Juan de la Cuesta, all of them natives of the town of Pozorubio de la Mancha (currently Cuenca), Julián Izquierdo, a native of the town of Nevajo in the Priory of Vélez; Miguel González, Jaime Navarro from Valencia; Francisco de Molina, Juan de Molina, Juan Lorenzo mayor (Father) and Juan Lorenzo minor (Son), natives of Lorca del Reyno de Granada; Gaspar García and Jaime Castellón, from Muchamiel (Alicante)

The second Letter of repopulation of Sagra was granted on January 7, 1611 by D. Jerónimo Ferrer, –Mr. Of Quartell and Commander of Orcheta, with powers of the Order of Santiago, having confiscation and by virtue of a Royal Commission dispensed by the Royal Council of the orders marked by D. Pedro Guzmán, attorney general of said Order of Santiago, Commander of Sagra and Sanet -, in it the first Puebla Charter of Sagra and Sanet is modified, expanded and ratified, granted on February 7, 1610 by D. Pedro de Guzmán y de Rivera.

== Demography ==
According to the INE municipal register for 2017, the municipality, which has an area of 5.62 km^{2}, 9 has 393 inhabitants and a density of 69.93 inhabitants / km^{2}. 25.05% of its inhabitants are of foreign nationality, mainly British.

Finally, King Felipe III approves and confirms by Royal Provision on March 5, 1613 the two town letters of Sagra and Sanet issued on February 7, 1610 and January 7, 1611, by Pedro de Guzmán and Jerónimo Ferrer respectively. The three documents in the form of repopulation letters were registered on June 23, 1620.8

== Parties ==
Festivities of San Antonio Abad. They are celebrated during the weekend following January 17, in a different street each year, with bonfire, festival, popular food and blessing of the animals. Festivities. They are celebrated in honor of San Sebastián, head of the parish of Sagra, Saints Abdon and Senén, patron saints of the town, La Purísima and Santísimo Cristo del Consuelo during the second week of August, highlighting the popular dinners, presentation of festeros, correfocs, festivals, processions and paella contest. Festivities of San Dominguito de Val. They are celebrated during the last weekend of August, in honor of the patron saint of the children of Sagra, with a proclamation, a murta car, mass, offering, popular food and entertainment for the little ones.

== Monuments and places of interest ==
Parish Church of San Sebastián Mártir, built in the s. XVI, by order of Archbishop Juan de Ribera who ordered the demolition of the mosque and dedicate the new church to San Sebastián. At this time, only the presbytery, the transept and the next section (S. Francisco and Virgen de los Dolores) were built. The most important reforms are from 1850 and the beginning of the s. XX, coinciding with the erection as vicarage in 1852 and the creation of the parish in 1902. The church has a rectangular plan with a central nave and chapels between buttresses. On the sides of the presbytery are the communion chapel and the sacristy, on which the choir is located. At the bottom of this we find the corridor and the door, currently bricked up, leading to the site that was called "the grave."

-Altar Major: Work of the master Francesc Oltra, from the year 1846, later it was enlarged with two lateral bodies in 1902 forming a set with numerous images of saints, a total of ten between carvings and canvases, including that of the holder, Sant Sebastian, and the patron saints, Abdon and Senen.

-Chapel of the Holy Christ of Consuelo: located in one of the arms of the transept, the height of this privileged site allows it to be the largest along with the High Altar. It is presided over by the image carved by the sculptors Rausell and Llorens on top of the litters with which it processes the second Sunday in August. This altar was built in 1853 and renovated at the beginning of the century.

-Communion Chapel: Decorated on the occasion of the creation of the parish, it was restored in 2001 on the occasion of the beatification of the former priest of Sagra, Fernando García Sendra, whose relic is in this chapel.

-Bell: built from 1810 to 1858 by the master Francesc Oltra underwent a major reform in 1997 when the original auction was changed for a modern one in imitation of the traditional Valencian baroque. It stands as a symbol of the town next to the characteristic clock, the only one of its kind in bell towers due to its perpendicular arrangement to the façade, which allows a view from both the main street and the País Valencià square.

-Town HallLocated in the main square of the town, it was inaugurated in 1993 by the president of the Generalitat En Joan Lerma. The new building is the result of the remodeling carried out by the architect Eduardo Beltrán Ruiz of the old house of Pompilio Alcaraz, a sagrero engineer, who lived in Madrid. He was a companion in the military service of Alejandro Lerroux, president of the government during the Second Republic, who spent long periods of time retired from public life in this house. The reform to enable the house in a town hall building managed to combine the old building with the new use through solutions, where the entire building is perceived through the large glass panels that distribute the different units. The large number of openings in the facades make the building have a great relationship with the environment, giving special life to the narrower streets such as the street below and the one dedicated to Joan Fuster. Apart from the City Hall's own uses, the building also houses the reading room, the computer room and the Social Center.

-Plaça de Les Fonts The town's main recreational place is the meeting point of the main underground streams of water in Sagra that converge at the "Fuente de los Cuatro Chorros" and passes through the laundry to continue the path watering the Sagra gardens, located in the lower area of the town. This place was formed near the banana plantation around the fountain made by the rector of the parish, Juan Seguí at the beginning of the s. XX. Here the day of Paellas has been celebrated in the Patron Saint Festivities since 1985. The current appearance is the result of the remodeling carried out in 1992 by the same architect who created the project for the new Town Hall.

== Notable people ==
- José Albiñana Rubio (Sagra 13 1819-Sagra 187914) was a pioneer Spanish photographer in the use of the daguerreotype. He had a studio in Madrid that enjoyed great prestige as a photographer for the palace of Isabel II.15 He settled in Madrid around 1845 and five years later he was appointed as a camera photographer for Queen Elizabeth II. In 1851 he made a panoramic daguerreotype for the Prado Museum. He is considered one of the first Spanish daguerreotypes in Madrid since the first to settle there had been foreigners and his cabinet on Calle de Alcalá, numbers 6 and 8,16 had great prestige at the beginning of the sixties.17 He used the technique of albumen copying to take his photographs, 18 being one of the first to make the well-known "visiting letters" created by André Adolphe Eugène Disdéri which consisted of a set of portraits, usually eight, in different poses.
- Fernando García Sendra (1905 - 1936), native of Pego, Parish priest of Sagra and Beato. At the age of 31, he was tried by representatives of the Popular Front. Condemned for his condition as a priest and executed at dawn on September 18, 1936 in La Pedrera de Gandia. He was beatified in Rome on March 11, 2001 by Pope John Paul II.
- Salvador Carrio Rovira (nicknamed El Zurdo), a native of Sagra, was born August 1, 1853. Professionally he dedicated himself to the peculiar trade of carriage transport known familiarly as "trajinante or muleteer", transporting merchandise and travelers by carriage or horse-drawn diligence or other animals. Patriarch and founder of the current Autocares Carrió, S.L.
- Redmond Gallagher (1914-2006), Irish chairman of Urney Chocolates confectionary company and a noted motorsport enthusiast
