= Urney Chocolates =

Former Irish confectionery brand

- Type: Public
- Industry: Confectionery
- Founded: 1919
- Fate: Original factory closed 1980, brand sold on
- Successor: Hazelbrook Confectionery (after L.C. Confectionery)
- Headquarters: Urney, County Tyrone (1919-1924); Tallaght, Dublin (1924-1980); Brand successors - Newbridge, County Kildare (1980 to date), Trinidad and Tobago (ABI - Catch)
- Key people: Eileen Gallagher; Harry Gallagher; Redmond Gallagher

Urney Chocolates (colloquially known as Urneys) was an Irish confectionery manufacturing business founded by the Gallagher family in County Tyrone, which once operated one of the largest chocolate factories in Europe. After being sold as a growing concern, ultimately to what would become Unilever, the factory closed in 1980. The brand was later operated by L.C. Confectionery Ltd., and is now handled by Hazelbrook Confectionery, based in County Kildare, Ireland.

== History ==
=== Foundation and early years ===
Urney Chocolates was established in 1919 by Eileen Gallagher and her husband, Harry (Henry Thomas), at their home, Urney House, in the parish of Urney, County Tyrone. Harry Gallagher was employed as Crown Solicitor for County Donegal. In an effort to stem the tide of emigration from the area in the wake of WW1, Eileen Gallagher started a market garden on the grounds of the estate, and organised snowdrops and ivy leaves to be bound together as posies to be sent to Covent Garden market in London. The garden also supplied fruit and berries from which jams began to be made and the rectory cellar soon became the base of a thriving cottage industry.

Having been refused a sugar allowance for a jam business, the only way to obtain a commercial quota was to diversity into confectionery manufacture, and as a result Gallagher began to produce small batches of raspberry fudge using the few domestic appliances available to her. The business was initially based in the back garden of Urney House. The expansion of the business picked up momentum, and within the first twelve months of operation the Gallagher's initial two casual helpers had risen to a staff of 20 people.

In 1920, about a year into production, a fire in the basement of Urney House burnt the building to the ground and brought production to a halt. In response, the Gallagher's built a bungalow and a small dedicated factory in which to resume business. An advertisement in The Irish Times dated 18 November 1921 announced the resumption of activities:

"After an absence of nearly a year, Urney Chocolate (sic) is back again. The new Urney, of which ample supplies are now available, is better and more delicious than ever. It is as pure, as fresh, as delightful as the mountain breezes that blow over the old Irish demesne in the midst of which it is made".

With the foundation of the new Irish Free State in 1922, Harry Gallagher's position as Crown Solicitor to County Donegal was dissolved and he directed his attentions to Urney Chocolates, forming a private limited company and installing himself as its chairman and managing director, whilst Eileen was established as director.

Urneys was the only chocolate manufacturer based in Ireland in the 1920s. Sourcing most of their supplies from Ireland, the company stressed this fact in their advertisements, and as a result their sales were strongest in what would become the Republic of Ireland. The business made little impact in Northern Ireland; a consignment of Urney chocolates being returned to the factory once marked with the message "We want no pope here" as part of the Protestant boycott of Catholic goods (the Gallaghers were Catholic).

Situated on the United Kingdom side of the newly created Northern Ireland border, the company also fell foul of the customs duty of "sixpence a pound" which was imposed by the Irish Free State on imported chocolates, which had to be paid every time the products entered the Free State. After a second fire on the factory premises, the Gallaghers decided to move operations to Dublin rather than trying to rebuild in County Tyrone again.

=== Move to Tallaght ===
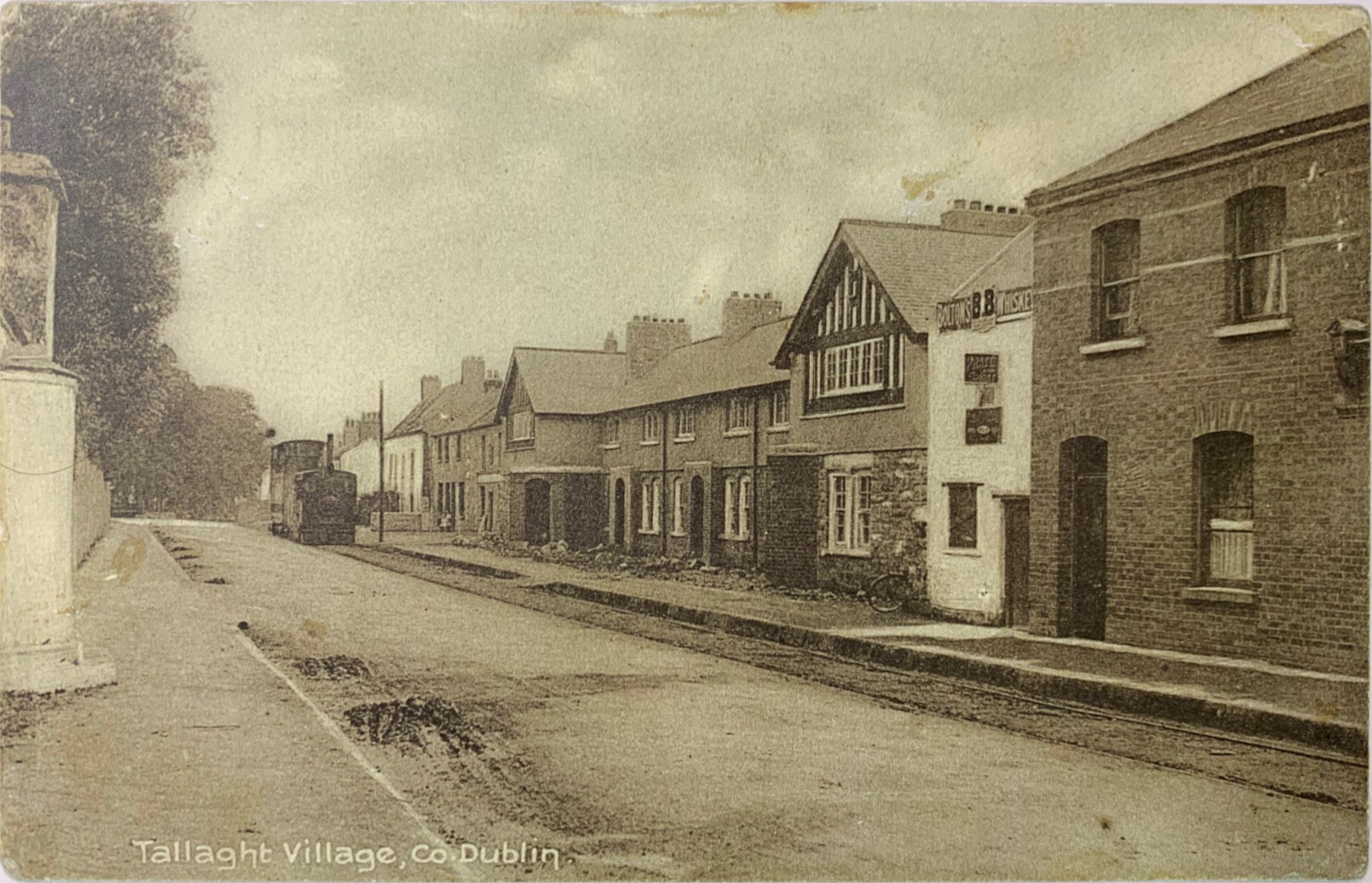
Postcard of Tallaght from the early 20th century, showing the extent of the village at the time

In 1924, the company moved to the disused WW1-era RAF airfield of Tallaght Aerodrome in the then-rural suburb of Tallaght, Dublin. The site had been handed over to the Irish Air Service in May 1922. Although ceasing to exist as a working airfield after 1924, the site continued to be marked as one on old maps and would receive infrequent planes landing in error as late as the 1940s.

The Gallaghers' offered the original staff the choice of relocating with them, which was accepted by 25 female employees, a carpenter and two maintenance men. The surviving machinery was transported the 160 miles from Urney to Tallaght and new equipment acquired too. There was ample space onsite, and housing was provided to the workers who needed it. The women's hostel block of the former aerodrome, as well as officer's mess, became a temporary home for the Gallagher family, before they finally moved into the former hospital building, which was rechristened Urney House. For the initial six months while the factory was being established, the Irish Army remained onsite and assisted with the removal of unexploded ordnance which was still being found onsite.

The population of Tallaght village by the time Urneys relocated there was in the region of 300-400 people. Most families would eventually have a direct link with the factory through a family member working there. Some Urneys staff would travel each day from as far away as the County Wicklow towns of Blessington, Ballyknockan and Hollywood, as well as the suburbs of Dublin.

Attaining financial support in the initial stages proved difficult for the Gallaghers and they could not afford a freezing plant. As a result, production was shifted to night-time hours which were cooler whilst office work continued during the day. Electricity was introduced to the factory in 1926 with the installation of two second-hand 50kw DC generators which had previously been used to power the town of Thurles prior to the town's connection to the national grid. The generators provided the necessary power requirements until Tallaght was similarly connected, itself being a small rural village demanding less urgency.

A keen gardener, Harry Gallagher used the factory grounds to grow flowers and shrubs, and planted orchards, vegetable beds and beehives. By the early 1930s, the "military starkness of the old air base was replaced with lush greenery" according to Nolan, and people would travel out from Dublin city to admire the gardens. Gallagher also bred cattle and thoroughbred horses on the grounds and was a prominent figure in racing circles.

=== World War II ===
Although Ireland remained neutral during World War Two (known as The Emergency in Ireland), the company had to adapt to sourcing their raw products from alternate markets. Whereas their pre-war supply of cocoa beans had come from West Africa, it had to now come from Brazil instead, and the glucose which was previously sourced in the Netherlands had to arrive instead from Canada as a derivative of maize. These transatlantic shipments could only venture as far as Portugal though, as any further north would have placed them in unnecessary danger. Instead, small coasters (owned by companies such as Stafford's Wexford Steam or Limerick Steam) would collect the cargo in Lisbon and carry it back Ireland, still at risk of attack by enemy craft. Despite the dangers, the company never lost a consignment.

During WWII, Britain banned the import of chocolate and confectionery from outside the sterling area, which was of huge benefit to Urneys as the Irish Free State remained within this closed market. The company began supplying chocolate crumb, couverture and fondant to British confectioners, who, unlike Ireland, did not have a plentiful supply of indigenous sugar and milk at their disposal owing to the war effort.

A second-hand German production line was purchased for the manufacture of milk chocolate blocks, brought over to Ireland and eventually replicated which doubled production. As Karen Nolan notes in her 2010 history of the company, Sweet Memories, the war period was a time of great expansion for the company:

"Four second-hand wrapping machines were bought in Scotland. These were later replaced with Swiss models. For the production of chocolate crumb, the company bought whiskey stills whose use had been discontinued by Powers distillery as it moved to a new premises. These were modified for milk, fitted with vacuum pumps made by a Dublin dockyard and used as vacuum pans. Steam engines were installed to run everything and the exhaust steam was used to heat the pans. A new eight-band vacuum dryer was bought and installed in its own building while a second-hand mixer in need of some specific alteration was also sourced. In time, the production of coverture was phased out in favour of chocolate blocks and crumb".

Even as food rationing in Ireland took hold as the war progressed, Urneys was still able to function on its sugar allocation as its entitlement as a company had previously been based on its sugar requirement during its busiest period. In 1943, the company was among several firms found guilty of contravening Emergency laws by selling their excess supply to confectioners with lesser quotas.

Rationing continued in Britain after the war ended in 1945, and export of chocolate crumb and confectionery from Ireland continued profitably, reaching its peak in 1953. In 1954, however, rationing ended and the UK Milk Marketing Board advised to buy indigenous milk for the manufacture of chocolate crumb domestically.

=== Post-war ===
Having been limited to a small number of choices during the war, customers in Ireland and Britain turned away from Urney products after the war ended, opting instead for the far more exotic alternatives that had been denied to them until so recently. To diversify their market, Redmond and Harry Gallagher got in touch with two US importers of chocolate and started supplying them with wrapped assorted sweets and small, solid chocolate eggs. Urneys also began exporting chocolate crumb to Lowneys, a leading confectionery firm based in Massachusetts.

In the 1950s, Pat O'Rorke from advertising agency O'Kennedy-Brindley created the slogan "Anytime is Urney Time", which subsequently "achieved cult status" all over Ireland that decade, according to Nolan, helping to promote the brand

In 1956, Eileen Gallagher, while travelling to the USA to visit her brother, smuggled a clutch of fertile White Holland turkey eggs back to Ireland. Gallagher successfully incubated the eggs and bred a large flock on three acres of the factory grounds, soon producing 3,000 birds a year for the Irish market. The livestock supplemented Urneys income during this time and also contributed to the wellbeing of staff who were served fresh turkey meat in the factory canteen at lunch-time and gifted oven-ready turkeys at Christmas.

=== Peak production ===
In 1958, food chemist Tommy Headon joined the company as business partner and managing director, while Redmond took over from his father as chairman. By the 1960s, Urney Chocolates and its subsidiaries were employing almost 1,000 workers, and the Urney facility was considered one of the largest chocolate factories in Europe.

By September 1960, the company had bought out Devlins of Cork Street, Dublin, a toffee manufacturer that had "long been recognised as the largest children's confectionery company in Ireland", according to the Dictionary of Irish Biography. The premises, workers and specific products were all retained, including their famous 'sweet cigarettes' for children, packaged with collectable cigarette cards.

In 1961, Headon as managing director initiated the takeover of English confectionery firm Murch of Burnley, Lancashire. The Murch machinery was dismantled and relocated to the Tallaght plant. In 1963, Urneys sold a 50% share to W.R. Grace & Co., a New York conglomerate who already had a majority holding in Van Houten's Cocoa, the long-established Dutch manufacturer of cocoa and chocolate products. This new partnership had the potential to open up access to extensive marketing networks for Urneys in the US, Canada, Europe and South America. Shortly after the merger, the UK branch of the Van Houten factory moved production from Chesham, Buckinghamshire to Tallaght, from where products supplied the UK and Irish markets. In 1964, W.R. Grace & Co. also acquired HB Ice Cream, a well known Dublin firm. In 1966, managing director Headon died of a heart attack while walking in the Dublin Mountains, which was an unexpected blow to the company.

To prepare for entry into the European Common Market and to accommodate expansion onsite, £500,000 was invested into the modernisation of the Tallaght factory over a period of three years; two fifths of it coming from an Industrial Credit Company (ICC) loan, a further £200,000 sourced from Urney resources, and the remaining £100,00 from a grant helping businesses adapt to the recently formed European Economic Community (which Ireland would join in January 1973).

Harry Gallagher and Eileen, the original founders of the company, died in 1975 and 1976 respectively. In 1977, Redmond retired to Sagra in the east coast of Spain. The area of Tallaght also began to experience heavy development at this stage, with the construction of thousands of houses.

=== Decline and closure ===
In the late 1960s, the rising price of sugar as well as increased competition from the snack market meant that redundancies were considered to be inevitable. W.R. Grace & Co. eventually acquired the remaining shares in Urney Chocolates. The factory was subsequently divided into four sections.

In 1973, Grace & Co. sold the Urney/HB business to Unilever as a growing concern. Unilever was happy to acquire the HB ice-cream component of the business, aiming for domination of the European ice-cream market, but found with Urneys that they now had a chocolate factory that "they didn't really want", according to Donal Donnelly, a former employee. In 1974, Unilever told employees that they would continue operating the chocolate factory for a further five years, at which point they would "have to make a decision" as chocolate was not one of their core products. In a new drive by Unilever, the successful Catch bar (along with other brands) was launched in 1976, and was still in production as of 2010.

In the coming years however, Unilever decided to opt out of the production of confectionery and rather to concentrate simply on the supply of ingredients to the industry. In August 1980, the Tallaght factory finally closed. The remaining 300 employees were recorded as receiving the highest recorded redundancy package for that time. As Donal Donnelly contends, it was a "fairly easy social decision" to close down Urney Chocolates and pay the staff redundancy, when considering the value of the land on which the factory stood, and the ease in which it was expected the staff would be able to get work elsewhere.

The extensive premises was taken over by a myriad of other small factories. The factory plant and all equipment were subsequently sold by auction, with most of the machinery going to international buyers. McMahon Confectioners, an Irish company, purchased specific equipment which had been used to make "Rovals" sweets, "Two and Two" bars and Easter eggs, but it too closed in 1985 owing to rising cocoa prices.

The former Urney factory eventually became a DIY store.

=== Succession ===
As of 2010, the Urney Chocolates brand was operated by L.C. Confectionery Ltd., owned by Leo Cummins, with a factory in Newbridge, County Kildare, and a retail outlet for the Hadji Bey brand in the English Market in Cork city. The chief chocolate-maker at L.C. that same year was Jim Collins, who first began working with chocolate at Urneys in 1970.

As of 2021, Catch bars were manufactured by a subsidiary of Associated Brands Industries Limited in the Republic of Trinidad and Tobago and being distributed to more than twenty countries around the world, including Guyana, Suriname, Panama, Florida, New York and the Tri State Area, Ireland, Malta, Cyprus, Taiwan and the entirety of the Caribbean.

== Working life ==
From a Quaker background on his mother's side, Harry Gallagher endorsed workers wellbeing in the ethics of how Urneys was operated. In the early years, Urneys was the sole employer in Tallaght village, which at that point consisted of a butchers shop, Molloy's pub (and grocery shop), a harness maker and forge, a hardware shop, a row of cottages and a police station. No more than four lamp-posts lit the village.

From the beginning, staff were provided with recreational facilities and encouraged to participate in extra-curricular activities, if not to offer a social outlet in the comparatively rural locality in which the factory was situated. Factory life engendered a strong sense of community, considering that many of the staff lived locally, if not onsite. Grounds for games, a reading room and library, luncheon rooms and halls for concerts, debates and drama were provided for staff comfort. Amongst the clubs available to staff to join were The Urney Sports and Social Club, a swimming club, a ring team, men's and ladies' football teams, an 'Inter-Department Question Time' as well as outings to the River Shannon and trips to Aintree Racecourse. Once a year, a dinner dance was also held for staff in Clerys of O'Connell Street, where the women were presented with a box of Tara chocolates made in the factory.

The Urney Variety Group was formed in the early 1970s and would provide entertainment for staff in the factory clubhouse with proceeds going to charity. The variety group was very popular and travelled the country to participate in Tops of the Town talent shows, and performed for children from local orphanages at Christmas. On Friday afternoons, the materials control section would become the distribution point for "throwouts", 1lb packs of broken chocolate and sweets which had not passed quality control and were sold at reduced rates.

Most of the staff at Urneys were devout Catholics, and after eating lunch would visit the statue of the Virgin Mary in the corner of the canteen to say five decades of the rosary. Many also participated in group trips to Lourdes in France.

Comedian June Rodgers, who grew up in Tallaght of the 1960s and 70s, recalls working with her sister at a summer job in a factory beside Urneys at which plastic spoons and rosary beads were made. Staff of Urneys whom Rodgers and her sister met coming down Belgard Road would give the girls chocolate, whilst "Across the road, would be Jacob's Biscuit Factory and we'd get biscuits from them."

== Branded products ==
- Catch bar
- Urney Anytime Assortment (formerly advertised as "any time is Urney time")
- Urney Two and Two
- Hadji Bey's Turkish Delight
