= List of Irish clans in Ulster =

List of Irish Clans in the province of Ulster

Sept of Irish origin
Sept of Scottish origin

== Northern Uí Néill ==
Niall of the Nine Hostages had seven sons, two of which, Owen (Eoghan) and Conall Gulban (Conaill) traveled north from the over-kingdom of Connacht and into the northern and western regions of the over-kingdom of Ulster, an area equivalent to modern-day County Donegal.

These two became the progenitors of the two Cenél's (or kindreds) that would make up the Northern Uí Néill; the Cenél Eóghain based in Inishowen, with their capital at Ailech; and the Cenél Conaill centered in the rich area of Magh Ithe, in the valley of the river Finn. For a time the Cenél Eóghain and Cenél Conaill alternated as kings of the Northern Uí Néill until the 8th century. The Northern Uí Néill would also alternate the High-Kingship of Ireland with their southern cousins the Southern Uí Néill into the 10th century.

== Cianachta ==
The Cianachta, or the race of Kane, also known as Clann Cian, descend from Cian, son of Oilioll Ólum, king of Munster in the 3rd century. The territory of the Cianachta spanned the present-day barony of Keenaght, which derives its name from them. By the 12th century, the Cianachta would be conquered by the Ó Cathaín.

=== Cianachta Glenn Geimin ===
The Cianachta Glenn Geimin of Clann Cian, or the Cianachta of Glengiven, ruled a region now known as Dungiven.

Sept (Common Forms)		
Ó Conchobhair (O'Connor, Connor)	Meaning: Progenitor:	Territory: Glenn Geimin, present day parish of Dungiven; Extra: Most powerful sept of the Cianachta, however were overthrown by the Ó Cathaín. Other forms of the name include: MacConnor, MacNaugher, MacNocker, MacNogher, MacNoher, and Nogher

== Síl Colla Fochríth ==
The Síl Colla Fochríth, descend from Colla Fochríth, the first king of Airgíalla and one of Three Collas. Clans and septs that are claimed to descend from Colla Fochríth but with no other information given include; Ui Maine, Fir Dubhshlat, Ui Conaill, and Ui Luain.

=== Imchad ===
Imchad was one of Colla Fochríth's sons, and from him son Muiredach Méth would descend the Uí Méith. The Uí Méith territory spanned northern County Louth, eastern County Armagh, and later in County Monaghan. John O'Donovan in his notes on the Annals of the Four Masters marks that there were two groups of the Ui Meith name; the Uí Méith Macha (or Uí Méith Tiri) and the Uí Méith Mara.

The Uí Méith Macha were based in the barony of Monaghan in County Monaghan. The Uí Méith Mara, meaning "Omeath by the sea", was seated in Cualigne in northern County Louth. The name Uí Méith survives as the present day name of the village Omeath.

Sept (Common Forms)		
Ó hAnrachtaigh (Hanratty, O'Hanratty, Henvey)	Meaning: Progenitor: Ionrachtach	Territory: Northern County Louth, and later County Monaghan; Extra: Styled as lords of Uí Méith Macha by O'Donovan. Archaic forms include: O'Hanraghty.
Ó hAinbhith (Hanvey, O'Hanify, Hanfy)	Meaning: Progenitor:	Territory: County Monaghan; Extra: Styled as lords of Uí Méith.

=== Cenél Rochada ===
The Cenél Rochada are descended from Rochad, one of Colla Fochríth's sons. The following terms are noted in the Annals to describe or group the clans and septs that would descend from Rochad:

- Uí Chremthainn – The Uí Chremthainn descend from Cremthann Liath, son of Fiac, son of Deig Duirn, son of Rochad. In effect the Uí Chremthainn consisted of multiple groups, part of the overall Airgíallan confederation. They ruled a territory spanning eastern County Fermanagh and northern County Monaghan.
- Síl Daim Argait – The Síl Daim Argait descend from Cairpre Daim Argait, son of Echach, son of Cremthann Liath, and are thus part of the Uí Chremthainn. Prominent groups include the Sil nDaimine and Clann Lugainn of the modern County Fermanagh area. Cairpre Daim Argait had three sons; Nadsluag, Lugain, and Daimine.
- Síl Duibthir – The Síl Duibthir are cited as being one of the "Trí Tuatha of Oirghialla" alongside the Uí Chremthainn and Fír Lemna. They descend from Duibthir, who in turn was descended from Cairpre Daim Argait, and are thus part of the Síl Daim Argait. The sept of Ua Laithéin are noted as chiefs of the Síl Duibthir. The territory of Sil Duibtir was just north of the Blackwater River and Clogher in what is now the civil parish of Clogher. Sil Duibtir were Kings of Ui Cremthainn and Airgialla in the 8th and 9th Centuries, including at the famous battle with the Cenél Eoghan at Leth Cam in 827AD.
- Uí Briúin Archaille – The Uí Briúin Archaille (also known as "Uí Briúin ar Chaill") descend from Brian son of Deig Duirn, who was a son of Rochad. This makes him the brother of Fiac from who the Uí Chremthainn descend. Their territory is described as being in the barony of Dungannon, County Tyrone.
- Dál nOaich – The Dál nOaich are cited as being descended from Cremthann Liath, who is also recorded as Cremthann Oach.
- Uí Labrada – The Uí Labrada descend from Labraid son of Deig Duirn, making him a brother to Brian and Fiac. Other than being noted in 1039 for slaying Murdoch mac Laverty O'Neill, the only other reference to them is the storming of their stronghold at Inis Uí Labrada by the Fir Manach.
- Uí Meic Brócc – The Uí Meic Brócc descend from Echdach Amainsen, son of Cremthann Liath. Not to be confused with the Uí Meics Brócc of the County Kerry Eóganacht.
- Síl nDaimine – The Sil nDaimine descend from Daimine, one of the sons of Cairpre Dam Argait, and are part of the Síl Daim Argait.
- Uí Cennfhada – The Uí Cennfhada descend from Fergus Cennfhada, King of Airgialla, who was a son of Crimmthain Liath and who descendants territory was Tír Cennfhada.Tír Cennfhada encompassed the Barony of Tirkennedy in Fermanagh, after which it is named and its former eastern portions made up of the civil parishes of Donacavey, Dromore and the southern part of Kilskeery. It was ruled from Fintona.

==== Clann Nadsluaig ====
The Clann Nadsluaig descend from Nadsluag, one of the sons of Cairpre Dam Argait, and part of the Síl Daim Argait. Their territory was in County Monaghan.

Sept (Common Forms)		
Ó Cearbhall (Carroll, O'Carroll)	Meaning: Progenitor: Cearbhall	Territory: County Monaghan; Extra: Princes of Oriel until their power was destroyed by John de Courcy
Mac Mathúna (MacMahon, Mahon)	Meaning: Bear; Progenitor:	Territory: County Monaghan; Extra: Ruled Monaghan from the decline of the Ó Cearbhall from the early 13th century to the end of the 16th century. Related Septs: Mac Pilib (MacPHILLIPS) and Mac Ardghail (MacARDLE)

==== Clann Lugain ====
The Clann Lugain descend from Cormac, one of the sons of Cairpre Dam Argait, and are part of the Síl Daim Argait. Their territory was in County Fermanagh.

Sept (Common Forms)		
Mag Uidhir (Maguire, McGuire, Guire, Guirey, Quirey)	Meaning: Dun-coloured; Progenitor:	Territory: County Fermanagh; Extra: Rose to prominence in around 1200, when Donn Mór Maguire established the sept in Lisnaskea, Fermanagh. Donn Carrach Maguire became the first Maguire King of Fermanagh in 1302, and between then and 1600, fifteen Maguires ruled as kings of Fermanagh.
Mac Gafraidh (Godfrey, McCaffrey, MacGofraid)	Meaning: God Wise; Progenitor: Gofraidh mac Donn Mór Maguire	Territory: Ballymacaffry, County Fermanagh; Extra: A Brehon family who were the Ollamhs to the Maguires.
Mac Maghnuis (MacManus, Mann, Manasses, Mayne)	Meaning: Manus; Progenitor: Maghnus mac Donn Mór Maguire	Territory: Ballymacmanus island (modern Belleisle), County Fermanagh; Extra: Hereditary managers of the fisheries of the Maguires. Cathal Óg MacManus would compile the "Annals of Ulster"
Ó hÉighnigh (Heaney, Heeney, O'Heaney, O'Heeney)	Meaning: Progenitor:	Territory: County Fermanagh; Extra: Amongst others ruled as kings of Fermanagh and Oriel until the rise of the Maguires.
Ó Maolruanaigh (Mulrooney, Rooney)	Meaning: Progenitor:	Territory: County Fermanagh; Extra: Amongst others ruled as kings of Fermanagh before the Maguires.
Ó Dubhdara (O'Darragh, Darragh)	Meaning: Progenitor:	Territory: County Fermanagh; Extra: Amongst others ruled as kings of Fermanagh before the Maguires

==== Clann Ceallaigh ====
Clann Ceallaigh descend from Cellach, son of Tuathal, king of the Uí Chremthainn, who in turn was descended from Daimine, one of the sons of Cairpre Dam Argait, and are part of the Síl Daim Argait. Clann Ceallaigh's name is preserved as the name of the modern barony of Clankelly in County Monaghan.

Sept (Common Forms)		
Mac Domhnaill (MacDonnell)	Meaning: Progenitor:	Territory: Counties Monaghan and Fermanagh; Extra: Fermanagh's oldest recorded ruling family. Their power was broken by the Maguires and they migrated to the MacMahon country of County Fermanagh where they became sub-chiefs.
Mac Maolruanaigh (Macarooney, Rooney)	Meaning: Progenitor:	Territory: Clankelly, County Monaghan; Extra:
Ó Flannagáin (Flanagan, O'Flanagan)	Meaning: Red, ruddy Progenitor: Flannacán mac Fogartach	Territory: Counties Fermanagh and Monaghan; Extra: Their headquarters was possibly in the parish of Donaghmoyne. Noted as chiefs of Tuath Rátha (Toorah) in County Fermanagh.
Ó Baoighealláin (Boylan, Boyle)	Meaning: Progenitor:	Territory: County Monaghan; Extra: Properly O'Boylan, this sept originally come from the same stock as the O'Flanagans in County Fermanagh and took over the kingship of the Dartraige (barony of Dartry) area of Monaghan in the late 10th century. By the end of the 11th century they controlled a vast tract of land from Fermanagh to Louth, and their chief was King of Fermanagh. By the 14th century however their power had been usurped by the MacMahon's.

==== Fernmag ====
The Fernmag, or Fer Fernmaighe, is an area around Lough Ooney, aka Lock Uaithne near Smithborough in the barony of Dartry, County Monaghan. Immigration to south-eastern Monaghan brought the territorial name along with it, being preserved in the name of the barony of Farney. The genealogies given for the Fernmag claim they descend from Fergusa, the son of Nadsluaig, who was one of the sons of Cairpre Dam Argait.

Sept (Common Forms)		
Ó Lorcháin (Larkin)	Meaning: Rough or fierce Progenitor:	Territory: Barony of Farney; Extra: Chiefs of Farney and the Uí Breasail of County Armagh
Ó Chríochain (O'Creehan)	Meaning: Progenitor:	Territory: Extra: Chiefs of Farney

==== Fír Lemna ====
The Fír Lemna (also known as Uí Tuathail and Síl Tuathail) are cited as being one of the "Trí Tuatha of Oirghialla" alongside the Uí Chremthainn and Síl Dubthir. Its territory was near Clogher, County Tyrone. The region of Magh Lemna is given as being in the parishes of Clogher and Errigal Keerogue in southern County Tyrone bordering County Monaghan. Their ancestry is cited as being from Tuathal, a son of Daimíne, making them part of the Síl nDaimini.

Sept (Common Forms)		
Ó Caomhain (O'Coen, Coen, Cohen, Cowan)	Meaning: Progenitor:	Territory: Extra: Cited as a king of Magh Lemna

== Síl Fiachra Cassán ==
The Síl Fiachra Cassán, descend from Fiachra Cassán, a son of Colla Fochríth. Airthir (barony of Lower and Upper Orior), meaning 'east', was one of the main branches of the Síl Fiachra Cassán until the 8th century when it split into the main septs of the Uí Nialláin, the Uí Bressail, and the Uí Echdach. The territory of Airthir was centered in Ard Macha (County Armagh), along the eastern baronies of Orior. Some of the clans given as part of the Síl Fiachra Cassán include:

- Uí Cruind
- Uí Tréna – The Uí Tréna were located in County Armagh and claimed to be descended from Trian, son of Feidhlimidh (Phelim), son of Fiachra Cassán. Not to be confused with the Uí Tréna in Leinster or Munster.
- Uí Dorthain – Also recorded as the Uí Dorthinn, Dorthaind, Dorethainn, Tortain, they are cited as being possibly near Ardbraccan, County Meath. They descend from Dorthon, grandson of Feidhlimidh, son of Fiachra Cassán.
- Clann Sínaigh – This clan is described as being in Airthir (Orior) in County Armagh, with the genealogies showing descent from Fiachrac Cassán.

=== Uí Echach ===
The Uí Echach, or the Uí Echach Airgíalla to distinguish them from the neighbouring Uí Echach Cobo of the Dál nAraidi, are suggested as ruling an area known as Tuath Echach, comprising the barony of Armagh in County Armagh. The Uí Echach Beg and Uí Echach Mór are noted as two branches of this group, but are also placed as being in Dál nAraidi and thus maybe part of the Uí Echach Cobo. According to the books of Lecan and Ballymote, the Síl Ciarain Uí Echach were located in Airthir.

The Uí Echach descend from Echach the grandson of Fiachra Cassán.

Sept (Common Forms)		
Ó Ruadhacain (Roghan) (O'Rogan, Rogan)	Meaning: Little red-haired one Progenitor:	Territory: County Armagh and barony of Iveagh; Extra: Noted as chiefs of Uí Eochada, tributary to the O'Hanlons at the time, and as chiefs of Airthir.
Ó Domhnaill (O'Donnell, Donnell)	Meaning: World ruler Progenitor: Domhnall	Territory: Airthir; Extra: Noted by O'Dugan as being a "noble tribe" of the Uí Echach

=== Uí Nialláin ===
The Uí Nialláin, or Clan Cernaich, descend from Nialláin, son of Féicc, son of Feidelmid, who was the son of Fiachra Cassán. Their territory lay in the baronies of Oneilland East and West in County Armagh, which both derive their name from the Uí Nialláin rather than the O'Neills. The Airthir kings of the Uí Nialláin sept ruled from Loch gCál (modern-day Loughgall).

Sept (Common Forms)		
Ó hAnluain (O'Hanlon, Hanlon)	Meaning: Outstanding champion Progenitor: Anluain mac Diarmada	Territory: Baronys of Oneilland East and West; Extra: Lords of Orior and Oneilland, and with the MacGuinesses, controllers of east Ulster. Originally conciliatory to the English until the 17th century. They descend from Anluain mac Diarmada a descendant of Nialláin.
Ó hÉir (O'Hare, Hare)	Meaning: "Son of the angry one" Progenitor:	Territory: Extra: Ruled as a king of Airthir

=== Uí Bresail ===
The Uí Bresail, also known as the Uí Bresail Airthir, ruled an area in northern County Armagh along the southern shore of Lough Neagh (in the barony of Oneilland East) before they were displaced by the lords of Clanbrassil, the MacCann's.

Sept (Common Forms)		
Ó Gairbhith (Garvey)	Meaning: Progenitor:	Territory: Barony of Oneilland East; Extra: Noted as being fierce chiefs, they held sway until being displaced by the MacCanns.
Ó Céileacháin (Callaghan)	Meaning: Companion; Progenitor:	Territory: Liscallaghan, County Tyrone and Oneilland East; Extra: Noted as chiefs of Uí Bresail Airthir. Archaic forms include (O')Kelaghan, Kealaghan, and (O')Keelan, however is as common in surnames, lesser names become lost to a more common name of similar sound, i.e. Ó Ceallacháin, a Munster sept that was first Anglicised as Callaghan.
Ó Longáin (Long, Longan)	Meaning: Progenitor:	Territory: County Armagh; Extra: Cited as being of the western Uí Bresail' by O'Dugan.
Ó Conchobhair (Connors)	Meaning: Progenitor:	Territory: Extra: Cited as being of the western Uí Bresail by O'Dugan.
Ó Duibheamhna (Devany, Devenny)	Meaning: Progenitor:	Territory: Extra: Cited as being of the western Uí Bresail by O'Dugan.

== Other Clans/Septs ==
Sept (Common Forms)		
Ó Ceanneidigh (O'Kennedy, Kennedy)	Meaning: Ugly head Progenitor:	Territory: Donegal; Extra: Not associated with the name of barony of Tirkennedy, County Fermanagh, which in Irish is the very different Tír Cennfhada.
Ó Daimhín (O'Davin, Davin)	Meaning: Ox; Progenitor: Daimhín mac Cairbre Dam Argait	Territory: County Fermanagh; Extra: Leading County Fermanagh sept up until the 17th century. King of Fermanagh in 1270s and Lords of Tirkennedy until 16th Century

=== Fir Rois ===
The Fir Rois were located in the barony of Farney, County Monaghan, and in the barony of Ardee, County Louth, and in Meath. Crích Ross stands 4 miles northwest of the point where the three counties meet.

Sept (Common Forms)		
Ó Coscraigh (Cosgrove, Cosgrave)	Meaning: Progenitor:	Territory: Carrickmacross, County Monaghan; Extra: Chiefs of the Fir Rois in Carrickmacross, Monaghan Likely extinct

== Síl Colla Uais ==
The Síl Colla Uais descend from Colla Uais, one of the Three Collas. Years before the Three Collas founded Airgíalla, Colla Uais ruled as king of Ireland until he and his brothers and three hundred followers were exiled to Scotland. Colla Uais had several sons including Eachach and Ercc.

=== Uí Meic Uais ===
The Uí Meic Uais descend from Ercc, a son of Colla Uais. The Uí Meic Uais are cited as having several branches;

- Uí Meic Uais Mide, in the barony of Moygoaish, county Westmeath. Septs include the Ó Comhraidhe (O'Curry, Currie)
- Uí Meic Uais Breg, in the barony of Upper Kells and Lower Navan, county Meath. Septs include Ó hAonghuis (O'Hennessy, Hennessy)

Yet the following are cited by Francis Byrne as being collectively known as the Uí Meic Uais, though groups of this name are also noted in the midland regions:

- Uí Maic Caírthinn, south of Lough Foyle
- Uí Fiachrach Arda Sratha, Ardstraw, County Tyrone
- Uí Tuírtri, west and east of the Sperrings

=== Uí Tuírtri ===
The Uí Tuirtri descend from Fiachu Tort, a son of Colla Uais. Their territory was said to have included an area west of Lough Neagh as well as north-west of Lough Neagh. One of the principal chiefs of the Uí Tuírtri was the O'Lynns, who ruled from Lough Insholin, Desertmartin, County Londonderry – the name of which is preserved in the modern barony of Loughinsholin. The Uí Tuírtri territory would expand into the lands north of Lough Neagh as they were driven eastwards by the Northern Uí Néill about the 10th century. At one stage the O'Lynns ruled a territory stretching all the way to the sea deep in Ulaid territory.

Cú Muighe Ó Floinn is cited as being king of the territories of Uí Tuirtri, Fir Lí, Dál Riata, and Dál nAraidi. Muircertach mac Thomas Ó Floinn the heir aspirant was slain "treacherously" by Hugh, grandson of Aodh Buidhe Ó Néill (progenitor of the Clandeboye O'Neills), and when his father Thomas died the realm passed into the hands of the Clandeboye O'Neills.

Sept (Common Forms)		
Ó Loinn (O'Lynn, Lynn, Lind, Linn, Lynd, Lindsay)	Meaning: Progenitor: Fhloinn mac Muiredach	Territory: Barony of Loughinsholin, County Londonderry and later baronies of County Antrim; Extra: Originally spelt in Irish as Ó Fhloinn, however, the 'f' is aspirated in Ulster Irish thus is silent. Despite being regarded as a senior branch of Clan Rury of Ulidia, the Book of Ballymote gives a genealogy giving them descent from Fiachu Tuirtri.
Ó Domhnallain (O'Donnelan, Donnelan)	Meaning: Progenitor:	Territory: Barony of Loughinsholin, County Londonderry; Extra: Cited as being chiefs of Uí Tuírtri in the 11th century.

=== Fir Luirg ===
The Fir Luirg, or men of Lurg, are listed as being among the Síl Colla Uais. By the 14th century, they were subjugated by the Maguires. Fir Luirg survives in the present-day name of the barony of Lurg, County Fermanagh.

Sept (Common Forms)		
Ó Maoldúin (O'Muldoon, Muldoon)	Meaning: Progenitor:	Territory: Barony of Lurg, County Fermanagh; Extra: Chiefs of Fir Luirg
Ó Conghaile (O'Connolly, Connolly)	Meaning: Progenitor:	Territory: Ballyconnolly, County Fermanagh; Extra:

== Other Airgíallan Septs ==
Sept (Common Forms)		
Mac Canann (MacCannon, MacConnon, Canning, MacConnell, MacCann)	Meaning: Progenitor:	Territory: Clones, County Monaghan, then south Monaghan-north Louth area Extra:
Ó Cearbhalláin (Carlin, O'Carolan, Carolan)	Meaning: Progenitor:	Territory: County Cavan, then migrated across the provincial border into County Meath; Extra:
Ó Cairre (Carr, O'Carr, Carry, O'Carry)	Meaning: Progenitor:	Territory: County Armagh; Extra: In early medieval times the chief of the Ó Cairre sept was recorded as being "steward of Cenél Aengusa and royal heir of Oilech"
Mac Cairre (Carr, Carry, MacCarry)	Meaning: Progenitor:	Territory: County Armagh; Extra:
Ó Conuladh (O'Connolly, Connolly)	Meaning: Hound of Ulster; Progenitor: Henry Mac Con Uladh Mac Mathúna (Henry Mac Cú Uladh MacMahon)	Territory: County Monaghan; Extra: Allegedly a sept of the southern Uí Néill driven north to Monaghan by the Normans, though it has been suggested that the Monaghan Connollys descend from Henry Mac Con Uladh Mac Mathúna, who died as "tanist of Oriel", thus making them MacConnollys. If this is correct then their name is properly Ó Conuladh rather than Ó Conghaile.
Mac Oscair (MacCusker)	Meaning: Champion; Progenitor:	Territory: County Fermanagh; Extra: Branch of the Maguires

== Uí Briúin Bréifne ==
The Uí Briúin Bréifne, or O'Brien Breffny, are a branch of the Uí Briúin kin-group. The Uí Briúin descend from Brion, son of Eochaid Mugmedon and Mongfind, and was an elder half brother of Niall of the Nine Hostages. The traditional territory of the Uí Briúin Bréifne was known as the kingdom of Bréifne, which included the modern Irish counties of Leitrim and Cavan, along with parts of County Sligo. It is speculated that Breffny derives its name from a pre-Celtic substrate language spoken in Ireland meaning 'ring' or 'loop', therefore making Breifne one of the oldest placenames in Ireland, dating prior to 500 B.C.

The two principal families of Uí Briúin Bréifne were the O'Rourkes and O'Reillys, who after a great battle in 1256, split the kingdom into East Bréifne and West Bréifne. The kingdom of Bréifne region remained part of the kingdom of Connacht until the time of Queen Elizabeth I when it was shired into the modern counties of Cavan and Leitrim, with Leitrim remaining within Connacht and Cavan becoming part of Ulster.

Sept (Common Forms)		
Mac Brádaigh (Brady)	Meaning: Progenitor:	Territory: East of Cavan Town, County Cavan; Extra: Properly MacBrady, this variant has been rarely resumed. They were a very powerful Breffny sept controlling a large territory. The Cavan Crozier, staff of the early MacBrady bishops, is one of the few Irish croziers to have survived the Reformation.

== Other Septs ==
Below is a list of other Irish septs in Ulster that can't be attached to any specific Cenél or Clann.

Sept (Common Forms)			Ó Duibh Dhíorma (O'Duvdirma, O'Dierma, Dermond, MacDermott)	Meaning:? Progenitor:	Territory: Parishes of Upper and Lower Moville, County Donegal; Extra: Ruled a territory known as "an Breadach"
Mac Duibhinse (Mac D(h)uibhinse, Mcavinch(e)y, Mc Avinch(e)y, Macavinchey, adopted Vincent.	Meaning: Progenitor:	Territory: Ulster, Counties Armagh, Londonderry, Monaghan, Tyrone, Dublin (1600s) and Limerick (1600s); Extra: A Sept / Family branch, who had their territory in counties Armagh, Londonderry and Tyrone in the Ulster province. Extra: The older record is Mcavinchey, Annie			
Ó Glacain (Glacken)	Meaning: Progenitor:	Territory: County Donegal; Extra:			
Ó Cadáin (O'Cadden, Cadden, Adam, Adams)	Meaning: Progenitor:	Territory: Roslea-Clones area, Fermanagh-Monaghan; Extra:			
Mac Cadáin (MacAdam, MacCadden, MacCudden, Adams)	Meaning: Progenitor:	Territory: County Armagh; Extra:			
Mac Ádhaimh (MacAdam, MacCaw, Adams)	Meaning: Son of Adam; Progenitor:	Territory: County Cavan; Extra:			
Mac Gille Andrais (Gillanders)	Meaning: servant of (St.) Andrew; Progenitor:	Territory: County Monaghan; Extra: A distinct Irish name of the same origin as its Scottish counterpart			
Ó Cnáimhsighe (Bonar, Bonner, Crampsey)	Meaning: Possibly mid-wife Progenitor: Cnáimhseach	Territory: County Donegal; Extra: First recorded in 1095, it is one of Ireland's oldest surnames. As it derives from Cnáimhseach, which is a female name, Ó Cnáimhsighe appears to be one of the few matronymic Irish surnames. Archaic Anglicisations include O'Cnawsy and Kneafsey			
Ó Buadhaigh (Boyce, Bogue)	Meaning: Victorious; Progenitor:	Territory: County Donegal; Extra: Archaic Anglicised as Buie and Bwee, both of which were still used as synonyms for Boyce in the early 20th century Donegal.			
Mac Broin (MacBrin, Byrne, Burns)	Meaning: Raven; Progenitor: Bran	Territory: County Down; Extra:			
Ó hUaruisce (Horish, Houriskey, Waters, Watters, Caldwell)	Meaning: Progenitor:	Territory: County Tyrone; Extra: Ó hUaruisce is a variant of Ó Fuaruisce. The mistaken notion that the "uisce" in their name meant water led to many Anglicising their name to Waters.			
Mac Conluain (Colavin, Cullivan, Caldwell)	Meaning: Progenitor:	Territory: County Cavan; Extra:			
Mac Giolla Chathair (Carr, Kilcarr, MacElhar, MacIlhair)	Meaning: Devotee of (St) Cathair; Progenitor:	Territory: County Donegal; Extra:			
Mac Giolla Cheara (Carr, Kerr)	Meaning: Devotee of (St) Ceara; Progenitor:	Territory: County Monaghan; Extra:			
Mac Cearbhall (Carroll, Mac'Carroll)	Meaning: Progenitor: Cearbhall	Territory: County Londonderry; Extra: Distinct from the Ó Cearbhall sept			
Ó Caiside (Cassidy, O'Cassidy)	Meaning: Progenitor:	Territory: Ballycassidy and erenaghs of Devenish, County Fermanagh; Extra: Have been in Fermanagh for over a thousand years and until the Plantations were prominent in the fields of literature, medicine, and religion. They became hereditary physicians and ollavs to the Maguires, and later to many other clan chiefs across Ireland			
Mac Laghmain (Clements, MacClement, MacClamon)	Meaning: Progenitor:	Territory: County Antrim and, to a lesser extent, counties Donegal and Londonderry; Extra:			
Ó Corcráin (Cochrane)	Meaning: Crimson; Progenitor:	Territory: County Fermanagh; Extra: Ecclesiastical family of Lough Erne			
Mac Colla (Coll, MacColl)	Meaning: Progenitor: Colla	Territory: County Donegal; Extra: Gallowglass family from Argyllshire introduced into Donegal in the sixteenth century. No connection to the Ulster MacCalls or MacCauls.			
Mac Coileáin (Collins, Caulfield, Cullen)	Meaning: Whelp; Progenitor:	Territory: Western Ulster; Extra:			
Mac Cuilinn (Cullen, MacCollin, Collins, MacCallen)	Meaning: Holly; Progenitor:	Territory: Extra:			
Ó Corra (Corr, Corry)	Meaning: Progenitor:	Territory: Counties Tyrone and Fermanagh; Extra:			
Mac Giolla Choscair (MacCusker, MacIlcosker)	Meaning: Progenitor:	Territory: County Armagh; Extra:			
Ó Coltair (Coulter)	Meaning: Progenitor:	Territory: Ballyculter, County Down; Extra:			

== Notes ==
All common Anglicised forms provided relate to usage in the province in Ulster and thus do not contain other Anglicised forms that relate to mirror Gaelic names from outside of Ulster. For example, the Irish name Ó Flaithbheartaigh is Anglicised as Flaherty, Flaffery and Flaverty in Connacht, however due to the aspiration of the 'F' in Ulster Irish, it is Anglicised and recorded as Laverty and Lafferty in Ulster thus the F variants have been excluded. The same for Flynn outside of Ulster, which is Lynn in Ulster.
