= Redmond Gallagher =

Irish businessman and racing driver (1914–2006)

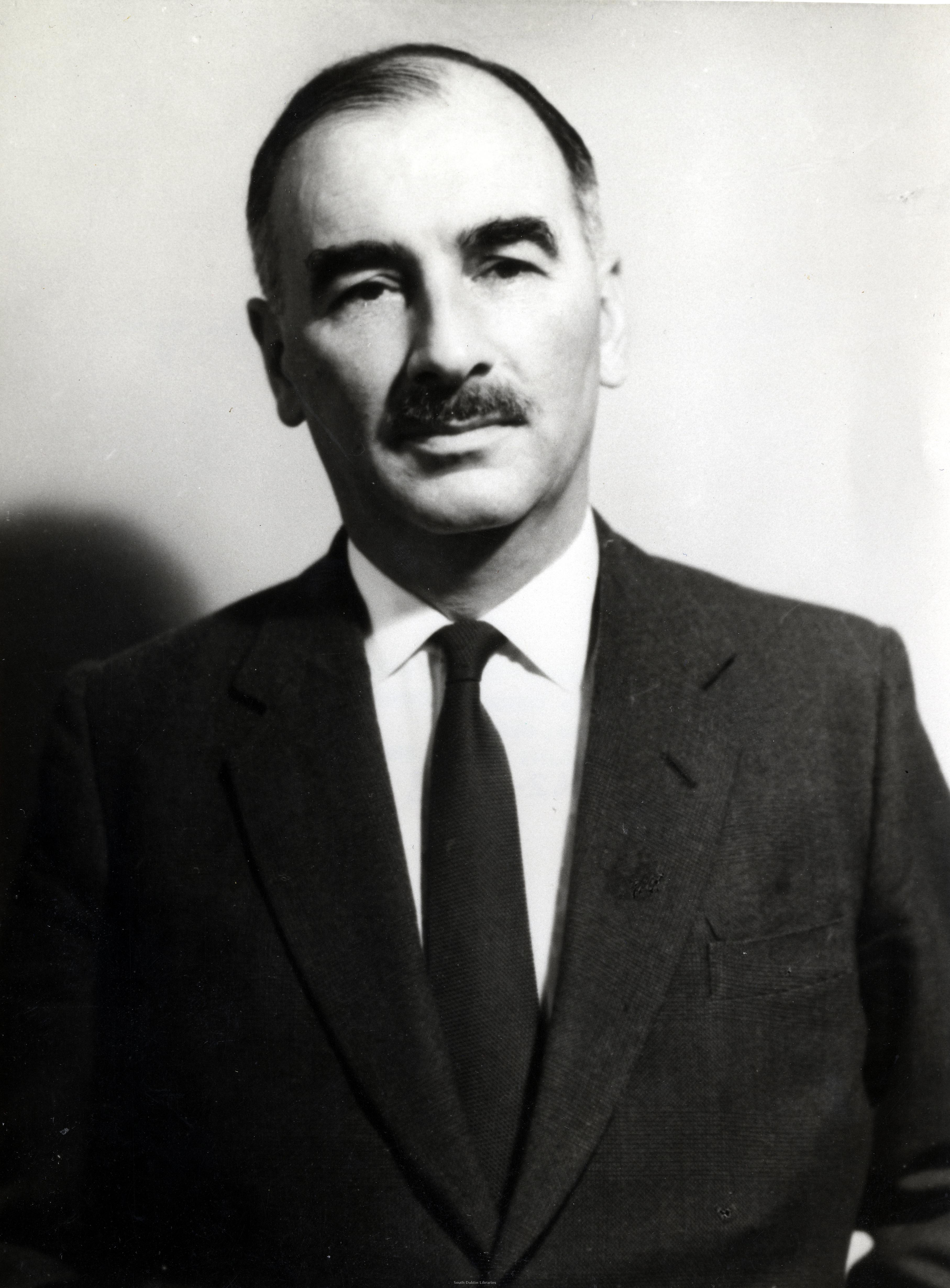
Redmond Gallagher

Redmond Gallagher (27 February 1914 – 31 October 2006) was an Irish businessman and racing driver. He was chairman of Urney Chocolates Ltd. and a noted motorsport enthusiast.

== Biography ==
=== Early life ===
Redmond Gallagher was born on 27 February 1914 at Dunwiley House, Stranorlar, County Donegal. His father was Henry Thomas Gallagher, crown solicitor for County Donegal and founder of Urney Chocolates. He was educated at Belvedere College, Dublin, where he was rugby captain. He wanted to become an engineer, but at his father's behest joined the family business of Urney instead, although he did also work as a steward at the Irish Grand Prix.

In 1934 at the Leipzig industrial fair Gallagher was introduced to Adolf Hitler as he was doing the rounds. He later remarked of Hitler that he was "almost comical".

=== Racing career and Urney ===
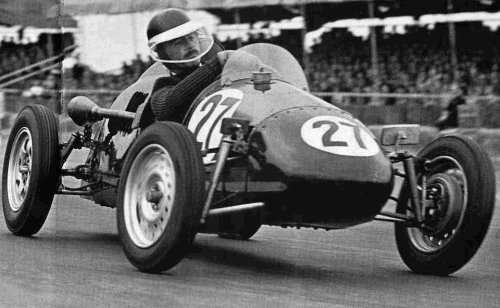
Gallagher racing in the Leprechaun at Silverstone, July 1951

In the years following the Second World War, Gallagher began racing his own self-built car "the Leprechaun", which was modelled on the Cooper. He entered into the 1951 Formula One season and drove the Leprechaun II for the British Grand Prix at Silverstone. The 1000cc Leprechaun III was most successful and won a number of speed events. Gallagher then raced in a two-seater Gordini T15S for several races, including the 1953 RAC Tourist Trophy, 1954 RAC Tourist Trophy and 1954 Wakefield Trophy at The Curragh, winning the latter. Gallagher continued racing from time to time until 1956, when he decided to return to the family business.

Gallagher became chairman of Urney in 1958, forcibly taking control from his father. In 1963 to his father's dismay, he sold the family share in the company to W.R. Grace. Gallagher continued on as chairman for three more years before retiring in 1966. That same year, Thomas Headon, who had been a key figure in the company, died, thus depriving the company of its leadership. Urney declined in the 1970s as its new foreign owners lacked interest in the company. In 1981, the factory finally closed down.

=== Later life ===
Gallagher owned extensive lands in County Kildare and County Wexford, and was active in cattle farming. He also owned several race horses, notably 'Fiery Diplomat' who won many races in England, France and Ireland. Despite retiring from the family business, Gallagher retained his wider economic interests and was a director of Coras Trachtála.

Gallagher emigrated to Spain in 1980 with his mistress Máirín McGrath, who was thirty-seven years his junior, and whom he subsequently married. He died at his villa in Sagra in 2006.

He was the uncle of Paddy McNally, a racing driver who went on to set up Allsport Management within the Formula One Group.
