= Gordini T15S =

Racing automobile

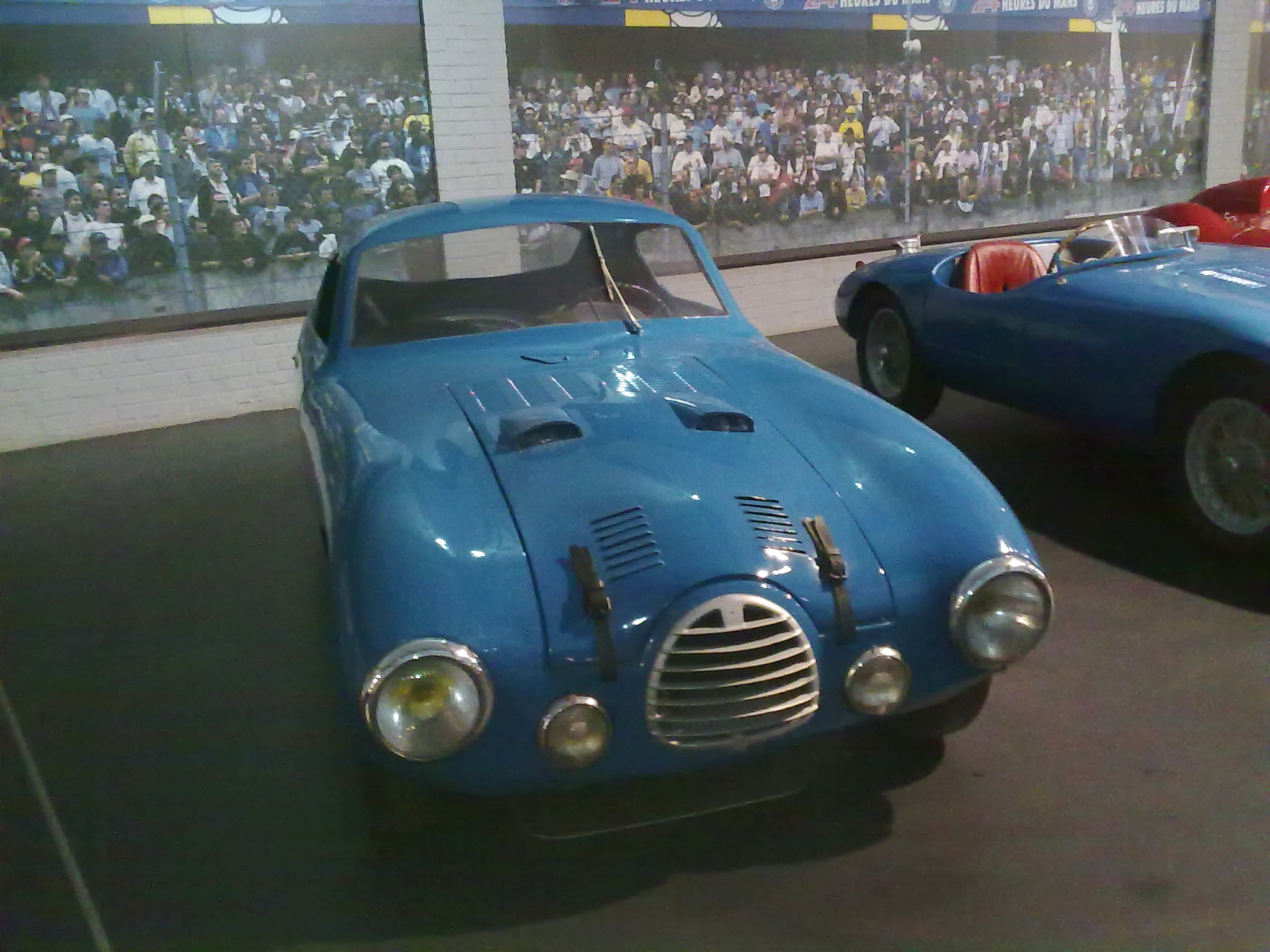
- Category: Sports car
- Constructor: Gordini

Technical specifications
- Chassis: Steel tubular spaceframe
- Suspension (front): Independent with torsion bar, hydraulic Messier dampers, anti-roll bar
- Suspension (rear): Rear rigid live axle, Watts linkage, Messier hydraulic dampers, anti-roll bar
- Axle track: 1,240 mm (48.8 in) (Front); 1,218 mm (48.0 in) (Rear)
- Wheelbase: 2,300 mm (90.6 in)
- Engine: 1.5 L (91.5 cu in) I4 naturally-aspirated mid-engined
- Transmission: 4/5-speed manual
- Power: 133–135 hp (99–101 kW) at 5250–6500 rpm
- Weight: 700 kg (1,543 lb)
- Brakes: Disc brakes

Competition history

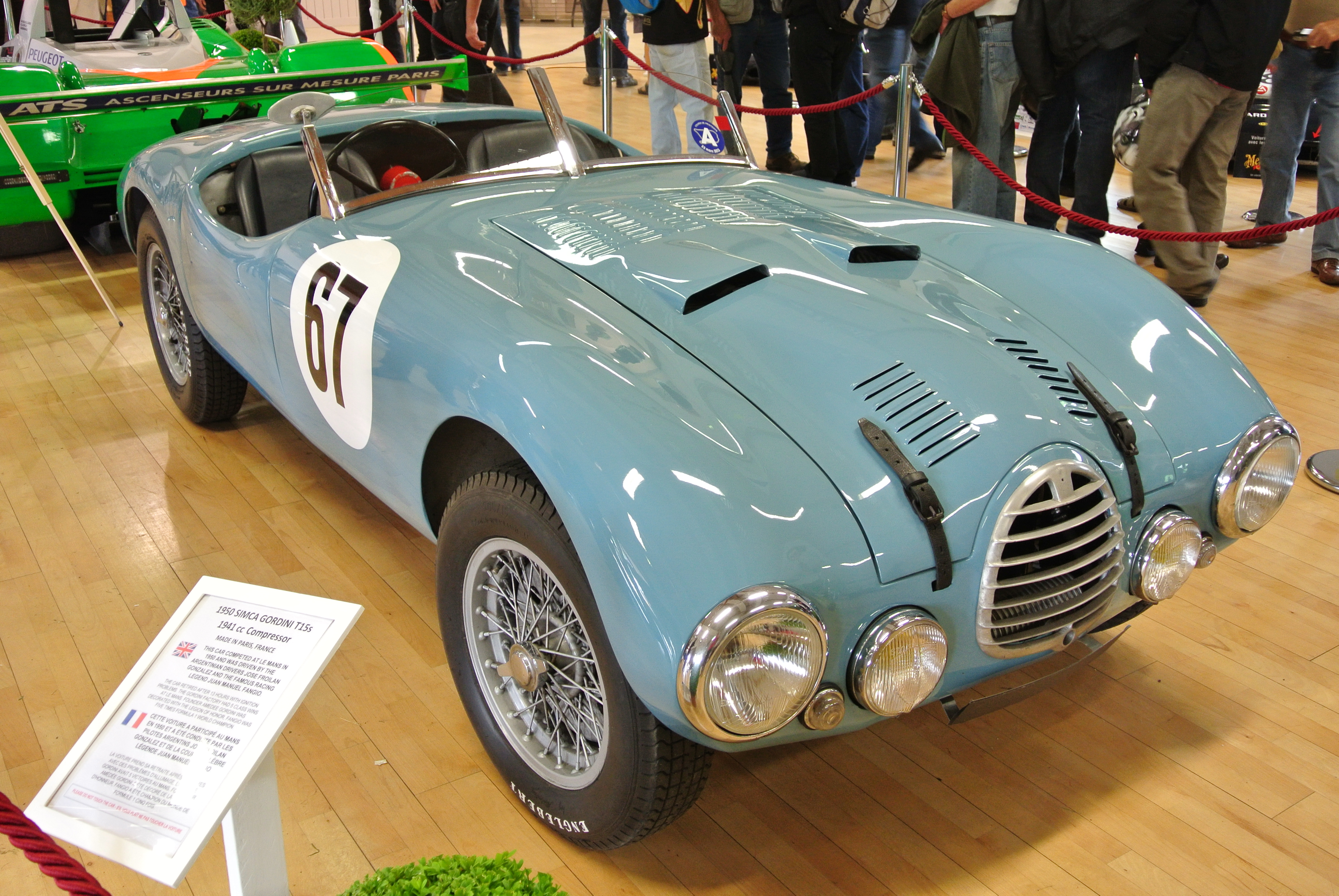
1950 Simca-Gordini T15S

The Gordini Type 15S is a sports car, designed, developed, and built by French manufacturer Gordini, in 1949.

== Development history and technology ==
The Gordini Type 15S was developed when Amédée Gordini was still closely connected to Simca. The suffix S in the type designation meant sport and distinguished the sports car model from the monoposto Type 15. Although the 15S was built as a spider-like all other Gordini, the coupe variant is the only closed Gordini sports car.

This type of racing car had different engines, but they were all based on the engine block of the Gordini 4-cylinder in-line engine. The displacement varied from 1.1 to 2.3 liters. The car was a financial success for Gordini. From the start of production, chassis were sold to private teams and drivers.

== Racing history ==
The Type 15S was also a successful sports car. In a total of 116 races, this Gordini type achieved 25 overall victories, eleven-second places, and seven third places; there were also 15 class wins. The first racing use was in 1949 at the 24-hour race of Spa-Francorchamps. Gordini reported two works cars, chassis 0017GCS, and 0018GCS, for Robert Manzon / Yves Giraud-Cabantous and Maurice Trintignant / Pierre Veyron. Both vehicles fell out of the race. The Czechoslovak privateer Zdeněk Treybal drove the first race win at the Brno Grand Prix in 1949.

For many years, the 15S was the vehicle the Gordini works team used in the major international sports car races of the 1950s, although there were consistently no successes. So there were only failures at the 24-hour race of Le Mans. Victories were achieved at other events. Robert Manzon won the 1952 Monaco Grand Prix with the 0018GCS chassis and the Coupe du Salon in Montlhéry with the 0016S. Maurice Trintignant remained successful at the Roubaix Grand Prix and at the Agen sports car race.

The most important success was the overall victory of Robert Manzon at the Pescara Grand Prix in 1956 against intense competition.
