= McNeill (surname) =

McNeill is a Scottish and Irish surname. The name McNeill is often associated with the islands of Gigha and Colonsay. The name is considered a sub-sept of Clan MacNeill, which is historically associated with the island of Barra in the outer Hebrides. The Irish and Scottish Gaelic patronymic meaning of McNeill is 'Son of Neil'. The annals of ulster claim Lóegaire mac Néill as King of Tara or High King of Ireland. The name Neil or Neill derives from the Irish Niall which is of disputed derivation. The Irish name may be derived from words meaning "cloud", "passionate", "victory", "honour" or "champion" As a surname, Neil is traced back to Niall of the Nine Hostages who was an Irish king and eponymous ancestor of the Uí Néill and MacNeil kindred. Most authorities cite the meaning of Neil in the context of a surname as meaning "champion".

== List ==
Notable people with the surname include:

- Alan McNeill (born 1945), Northern Irish footballer
- Alex McNeill (c. 1875–?), Scottish footballer
- Alexander McNeill (New Zealand politician) (1833–1915)
- Alexander McNeill (1842–1932), Canadian politician
- Alim McNeill (born 2000), American football player
- Allen McNeill (born 1951), American politician
- Allison McNeill (born 1959), Canadian basketball coach
- Amari McNeill (born 2003), American football player
- Ann McNeill, British academic and tobacco policy expert
- Anthony McNeill (1941–1996), Jamaican poet
- Archibald McNeill (died 1849), American politician from North Carolina
- Ben McNeill, Australian film producer
- Beth McNeill (born 1982), New Zealand cricketer
- Billy McNeill (1940–2019), Scottish footballer and manager
- Billy McNeill (ice hockey) (1936–2007), Canadian ice hockey player
- Bob McNeill (born 1938), American basketball player
- Charlie McNeill (bowls) (1888–1974), Australian lawn bowls player
- Chris McNeill (1954–2011), American ski jumper
- Dan K. McNeill (born 1946), United States Army four-star general
- Daniel McNeill (1947–2017), American politician from Pennsylvania
- Daryl C. McNeill (c. 1960–2013), American football player and coach
- David McNeill (disambiguation), multiple people
- Don McNeill (disambiguation), multiple people, including:
  - Don McNeill (radio presenter) (1907–1996), American radio personality
  - Don McNeill (tennis) (1918–1996), American tennis player
- Donald Burgess McNeill (1911–2010), physics and transport author
- Dorelia McNeill (1881–1969), English artists' model
- Duncan McNeill, 1st Baron Colonsay (1793–1874), Scottish judge and politician
- Edwin R. McNeill (1880–1962), American attorney and judge
- Esther Lord McNeill (1812–1907), American temperance movement leader
- Fergus McNeill, Scottish writer
- F. Marian McNeill (1885–1973), Scottish folklorist
- Fred McNeill (1952–2015), American football linebacker
- George McNeill (golfer) (born 1975), American golfer
- George McNeill (sprinter) (born 1947), Scottish athlete and footballer
- George E. McNeill (1836–1906), American labor leader
- George Monroe McNeill (1845–1931), Union Army soldier and a founder of Carterville, Illinois
- Gordon James McNeill (1922–1999), Canadian politician
- Graham McNeill (born c. 1971), British novelist and game developer
- Grant McNeill (born 1983), Canadian ice hockey player
- Hamish McNeill (1934–2017), Scottish footballer
- Hector McNeill (1728–1785), officer in the Continental Navy during the American Revolutionary War
- Hinematau McNeill, New Zealand academic and treaty negotiator
- Ian McNeill (1932–2017), Scottish footballer and manager
- James McNeill (1869–1938), Irish politician and diplomat
- Jane McNeill (born 1966), American actress
- Janet McNeill (1907–1994), Irish novelist and playwright
- Jeanne McNeill, American politician
- Jim McNeill (born 1960), British polar explorer, presenter and keynote speaker
- John McNeill (disambiguation), multiple people
- Josephine McNeill (1895–1969), Irish diplomat
- Kenneth McNeill (1918–2001), Jamaican politician and surgeon
- Kia McNeill (born 1986), American soccer player
- Kim McNeill, American basketball coach
- Larry McNeill (1951–2004), American basketball player
- Lawrence McNeill (1849–1915), American businessman
- Lee Vernon McNeill (born 1964), American track and field athlete
- Lisa McNeill, New Zealand consumer behaviourist
- Lloyd McNeill, American jazz flutist and visual artist
- Louise McNeill (1911–1993), American poet, essayist and historian of Appalachia
- Malcolm McNeill (born 1945), New Zealand jazz singer
- Marcus McNeill (born 1983), American football offensive tackle
- Mark McNeill (born 1993), Canadian ice hockey forward
- Mica McNeill (born 1993), British bobsledder
- Mike McNeill (ice hockey) (born 1966), American ice hockey player
- Mike McNeill (American football) (born 1988), American football tight end
- Neil McNeill (1921–2009), Australian politician
- Neil McNeill (footballer) (born 1932), Australian rules footballer
- Niall McNeill (1899–1969), Irish army officer and entomologist
- Pamela McNeill, American singer-songwriter
- Patrick McNeill (born 1987), Canadian ice hockey player
- Pauline McNeill (born 1962), Scottish Labour politician
- Reid McNeill (born 1992), Canadian ice hockey player
- Robert McNeill (footballer) (1873–?), Scottish footballer for Sunderland and Greenock Morton
- Robert B. McNeill (1915–1975), American Presbyterian minister
- Robert Duncan McNeill (born 1964), American actor, producer and director
- Robert H. McNeill (1917–2005), American photographer
- Rod McNeill (born 1951), American football running back
- Roger McNeill (1853–1924), Scottish physician
- Ronald McNeill, 1st Baron Cushendun (1861–1934), British Conservative politician
- Ruffin McNeill (born 1958), American football coach
- Serayah Ranee McNeill (born 1995), American actress, model and singer
- Sheila McNeill, American politician
- Sophie McNeill (born 1986), Australian journalist, television presenter and human rights activist
- Stu McNeill (born 1938), Canadian ice hockey player
- Sylvia McNeill (born 1947), British pop and rock singer-songwriter
- Tara McNeill, Irish violinist, harpist and soprano singer
- Ted McNeill (1929–1979), English footballer
- Tom McNeill (born 1942), American football punter
- William McNeill (disambiguation), multiple people
- Wykeham McNeill (born 1957), Jamaican politician

As first or middle name

- Robert McNeill Alexander (1934–2016), British zoologist
- Donald McNeill Fairfax (1818–1894), United States Navy admiral
- Isabel McNeill Carley (1918–2011), American writer, editor and composer
- Charles McNeill Gray (1807–1885), American politician
- Lillian McNeill Palmer (1871–1961), American coppersmith and metalsmith
- Daniel McNeill Parker (1822–1907), Canadian physician and politician
- James Abbott McNeill Whistler (1834–1903), American artist
- Anna McNeill Whistler (1804–1881), American art model, the mother of James Abbott McNeill Whistler
- McNeill Smith (1918–2011), American politician and attorney

== See also ==
- McNeil (disambiguation)
- MacNeil
- MacNeill
- McNeal
- MacNeal
- MacNeille
