= McNeil (surname) =

McNeil or MacNeil is a Scottish surname of Irish origin and that surname is closely related to the Gaelic speaking Isle of Barra in the Hebrides (Clan MacNeil). Notable people with the surname include:

== People ==
=== Actors and models ===
- Catherine McNeil (born 1989), Australian model
- Claudia McNeil (1917–1993), American actress
- Kate McNeil (born 1959), American television actress
- Nancy McNeil (born 1947), American model in Playboy magazine
- Scott McNeil, Australian-Canadian voice actor

=== Military personnel ===
- Clarence H. McNeil (1873–1947), American general in the United States Army
- John McNeil (1813–1891), American general in the Union Army during the Civil War
- John McNeil Jr. (1784–1850), American general in the United States Army
- John McNeill (British Army officer) (1831–1904), British major-general and recipient of the Victoria Cross
- Joseph McNeil (1942–2025), American general in the United States Air Force and member of the Greensboro Four

=== Musicians and singers ===
- Albert J. McNeil (1920–2022), American choral conductor and ethnomusicologist
- Dennis McNeil (born 1960), American operatic tenor, musical theater performer and concert singer
- John McNeil (musician) (1948–2024), American jazz musician
- Megan McNeil (1990–2011), Canadian singer
- Suzie McNeil (born 1976), Canadian vocalist, contestant on Rock Star: INXS
- Ron McNeil (musician) (born 1965), American singer-songwriter, co-founder of Emmy award winning Beatles tribute The Fab Four

=== Politicians ===
- David B. McNeil (1818–1897), American politician in New York state
- D. C. McNeil (1927–2015), Canadian politician
- Duncan McNeil (born 1950), Scottish politician
- Francis J. McNeil (born 1932), American ambassador to Costa Rica
- Hector McNeil (1907–1955), Scottish politician
- James McNeil (born 1958), American businessman and politician
- Luis Anderson McNeil (born 1941), Panamanian politician, Minister of Labor
- Margo McNeil (born 1948), American politician from Missouri
- Mary McNeil, Canadian politician
- Myron S. McNeil (1873–1944), American politician and state senator from Mississippi
- Ron McNeil (1920–2003), Canadian politician
- Stephen McNeil (born 1964), Canadian politician, 28th premier of Nova Scotia
- William McNeil (1906–1964), Australian politician

=== Sportspeople ===
==== Baseball ====
- Jeff McNeil (born 1992), American baseball player for the New York Mets
- Norm McNeil (1892–1942), American professional baseball catcher, played briefly with the Boston Red Sox

==== Football (soccer) ====
- Andrew McNeil (born 1987), Scottish football coach and former football goalkeeper
- Bob McNeil (footballer) (1890–1948), Scottish footballer for Hamilton Academical and Chelsea
- Bobby McNeil (born 1962), Scottish footballer for Hull City, Lincoln City, Preston North End and Carlisle United
- Charlie McNeil (footballer) (1963–2016), Scottish footballer
- Dave McNeil (1921–1993), English footballer
- David McNeil (footballer) (born 1995), Scottish footballer
- Dixie McNeil (born 1947), English former footballer and manager
- Donald McNeil (footballer) (born 1958), Scottish footballer
- Dwight McNeil (born 1999), English footballer
- Henry McNeil (footballer) (1853–1924), Scottish footballer for Queen's Park and Scotland
- Hugh McNeil (1878–1960), Scottish footballer for Motherwell, Celtic, Morton and Hamilton Academical
- Hugh McNeil Jr (born 1902), son of the above, Scottish footballer for Motherwell and Hamilton Academical
- John McNeil (footballer, born 1959), Scottish former footballer primarily with Morton
- Johnny McNeil (fl. 1930s), Scottish footballer and manager
- Mark McNeil (born 1962), English former footballer
- Martin McNeil (born 1980), Scottish former footballer
- Matt McNeil (1927–1977), Scottish footballer
- Matty McNeil (born 1976), English former footballer
- Mick McNeil (1940–2025), English former footballer
- Moses McNeil (1855–1938), Scottish footballer for Rangers (founding member of the club) and Scotland
- Peter McNeil (footballer) (1854–1901), Scottish footballer for Rangers (founding member of the club)

==== Gridiron football ====
- Charlie McNeil (American football) (1936–1994), American defensive back in gridiron football
- Clifton McNeil (born 1940), American former wide receiver in gridiron football
- Douglas McNeil (born 1988), American wide receiver in gridiron football
- Emanuel McNeil (born 1967), American former defensive tackle in gridiron football
- Frank McNeil (1909–1971), American football player for the Brooklyn Dodgers
- Freeman McNeil (born 1959), American former running back in gridiron football
- Gerald McNeil (born 1962), German-born American former wide receiver in gridiron football
- Jay McNeil (born 1970), Canadian former offensive lineman in gridiron football
- Pat McNeil (born 1954), American former running back in gridiron football
- Raymond McNeil (born 1984), American offensive lineman in gridiron football
- Ryan McNeil (American football) (born 1970), American former defensive back in gridiron football
- Thomas H. McNeil (1860–1932), American quarterback in gridiron football and lawyer

==== Ice hockey ====
- George McNeil (ice hockey) (1914–1997), Canadian ice hockey player and coach
- Gerry McNeil (1926–2004), Canadian ice hockey goaltender

==== Other ====
- Alastair McNeil (1915–1944), Scottish international rugby union player
- Calum McNeil (born 1966), Scottish wrestler
- Charles K. McNeil (1903–1981), American inventor of the point spread in sports gambling
- Colin McNeil (born 1972), Scottish former professional boxer
- Hector McNeil (footballer) (1901–1969), Australian rules footballer
- Jeremy McNeil (born 1980), American former basketball player for Syracuse University
- Jimmy McNeil (? – c. 2003), Scottish rugby union player
- Jye McNeil (born 1994), Australian jockey
- Lachlan McNeil (born 2001) Australian rules footballer
- Loretta McNeil (1907–1988), American athlete and Olympic sprinter
- Lori McNeil (born 1963), American tennis coach and former player
- Pablo McNeil (1939–2011), Jamaican track and field sprinter and sprinting coach
- Sally McNeil (born 1960), American bodybuilder convicted in the shooting death of her husband and fellow bodybuilder, Ray McNeil
- Tom McNeil (1929–2020), Australian rules footballer and politician
- Vic McNeil (1890–1936), Australian rules footballer

=== Writers ===
- Baye McNeil, American writer living in Japan
- Carla Speed McNeil (born 1969), American sci-fi writer and illustrator
- Donald McNeil Jr. (born 1954), American journalist
- Florence McNeil (c. 1932–2013), Canadian poet, writer and playwright
- Frances McNeil, English novelist and playwright also writing as Frances Brody
- Henry Everett McNeil (1862–1929), American writer
- Jean McNeil (born 1968), Canadian-born fiction and travel author working in England
- Jim McNeil (1935–1982), Australian convict and playwright
- Joanne McNeil, American writer, editor and art critic
- Legs McNeil (born 1956), American music journalist and founder of Punk magazine
- Sacha McNeil, New Zealand journalist and news presenter
- Steve McNeil (born 1979), English television presenter, writer and comedian
- W. K. McNeil (1940–2005), American folklorist and historian

=== Other ===
- Anne McNeil (born 1977), American chemist
- Barbara Joyce McNeil (born 1941), American physician
- Bruce McNeil (1939–2019), American environmental fine arts photographer
- Charles McNeil (physician) (1881–1964), Scottish paediatrician
- Daniel McNeil (1853–1918), Canadian lawyer and judge
- Darrell McNeil (1957–2018), American animator, writer, editor, publisher, producer and actor
- Dorothy Blackwell McNeil (born 1940s), American businesswoman
- Dudley B. McNeil (1908–1977), American prelate of the Episcopal Church
- Fannie Knowling McNeil (1869–1928), Canadian suffragist and artist
- George McNeil (artist) (1908–1995), American abstract expressionist painter
- Howard McNeil (1920–2010), American meteorologist
- Ida McNeil (1888–1974), American broadcaster and flag designer
- Larry McNeil (photographer) (born 1955), American photographer and printmaker
- Neil McNeil (1851–1934), Roman Catholic Archbishop of Toronto
- Neil McNeil (businessman) (1855–1927), Western Australian businessman
- Neil E. McNeil (1875–?), American attorney and Associate Justice of the Oklahoma Supreme Court
- Patricia McNeil, Canadian costume designer and production designer
- Peter McNeil (architect) (1917–1989), Canadian architect
- Robert L. McNeil Jr. (1915–2010), American chemist and pharmaceutical industry executive

== Fictional characters ==
- Michael McNeil, character in Command & Conquer 3: Tiberium Wars played by Michael Biehn
- Ryan McNeil, character in The Young and the Restless played by Scott Reeves
- Tricia McNeil, character in The Young and the Restless played by Sabryn Genet

== As first or middle name ==
- Mcneil Clarke (1838–1872), Ontario lawyer and political figure
- McNeil Hendricks (born 1973), South African former rugby union player
- McNeil Moore (1933–2023), American defensive back in gridiron football
- McNeil Morgan (born 1970), Vincentian cricketer
- Joseph Hector McNeil Carruthers (1857–1932), Australian politician, Premier of New South Wales
- John McNeil Eddings (1830–1896), American military storekeeper and civic leader
- Edward McNeil Farmer (1901–1969), American artist and designer
- Richard McNeil Henderson (1886–1972), British engineer and colonial administrator
- Adrienne McNeil Herndon (born Adrienne Elizabeth McNeil; 1869–1910), designer of the Herndon Home
- Irving McNeil Ives (1896–1962), American politician, Senator from New York
- Reed McNeil Izatt (1926–2023), American chemist
- Ryan McNeil Lamswood (born 2000), Canadian curler
- James McNeil Stephenson (1796–1877), American lawyer, businessman and politician
- Keith McNeil Campbell-Walter (1904–1976), British admiral
- John McNeil Wilmot (1755–1847), Canadian businessman, judge and political figure in New Brunswick
- Leone McNeil Zimmer (1916–2014), American stained glass artist

== See also ==
- MacNeil
- MacNeill
- MacNeille
- McNeal
- MacNeal
- McNeill (disambiguation)
