= MacNeill =

== History ==
The MacNeills originate from Scotland. The MacNeill name is linked to the Scottish clan of the same name and is associated with the Outer Hebrides island of Barra, and the Inner Hebrides islands of Colonsay and Gigha. Clan MacNeill has a long and distinguished history. Recent genealogy studies have shown that Clan MacNeill is of Norse-Gael descent, rather than Irish as was once believed.

== People ==
- Conor MacNeill (born 1988), Northern Irish actor
- Craig William Macneill, American film director, writer and editor
- Daniel MacNeill (1885–1946), Canadian businessman and politician
- Dick MacNeill (1898–1963), Dutch association football player
- Eoin MacNeill (1867–1945), Irish scholar
- Francis MacNeill (1912–2000), Canadian educator and politician
- Hector Macneill (1746–1818), Scottish poet
- Hubert B. MacNeill (1922–2020), Canadian physician and politician
- Hugo MacNeill (disambiguation), multiple people
- James MacNeill (disambiguation), multiple people
- Jennifer Carroll MacNeill (born 1980), Irish politician
- John MacNeill (disambiguation), multiple people
- Karen MacNeill (born 1972), Canadian field hockey player
- Lóegaire mac Néill (reigned circa 428 to 458), Irish king
- Leonard M. MacNeill (1883–1932), Canadian accountant and politician
- Máire MacNeill (1904–1987), Irish journalist, folklorist and translator
- Meredith MacNeill (born 1975), Canadian actress and comedian
- Michele MacNeill (1957–2007), American murder victim
- Murray Macneill (1877–1951), Canadian curler
- Peter MacNeill, Canadian actor
- Robbie MacNeill (born 1946/47), Canadian singer-songwriter
- Torquil MacNeill, 16th-century Scottish chief

As first name

- MacNeill Weir (1877–1939), Scottish politician

== Businesses ==
- MacNeill Secondary School, a secondary school in Richmond, British Columbia, Canada

== See also ==
- McNeil (disambiguation)
- McNeill (disambiguation)
- MacNeil
- Mac Néill
- McNeal
- MacNeal
- MacNeille
