= MacNeil =

MacNeil can have a number of different meanings and spellings:

Clan MacNeil is a Scottish clan.

== Notable people ==
- Al MacNeil (1935–2025), Canadian ice hockey player and coach
- Angus MacNeil (born 1970), Scottish politician
- Archibald Macneil of Colonsay (fl. 1773–1805), Scottish laird
- Bernie MacNeil (born 1950), Canadian ice hockey player
- Bhreagh MacNeil, Canadian actress
- Brett MacNeil (born 1967), Canadian gridiron football player
- Carol Brooks MacNeil (1871–1944), American sculptor
- Carole MacNeil (born 1964), Canadian television journalist
- Charles Grant MacNeil (1892–1976), Canadian politician
- Chuck MacNeil (born 1944), Canadian politician
- Colin MacNeil, British comics artist
- Colin MacNeil (footballer) (1936–2025), Australian rules footballer
- Cooper MacNeil (born 1992), American racecar driver
- Cornell MacNeil (1922–2011), American baritone
- Donald C. MacNeil (1924–1978), Canadian politician
- Drew MacNeil (born 1964), Scottish shinty player
- Flora MacNeil (1928–2015), Scottish Gaelic singer
- Heather MacNeil, Canadian archivist
- Hermon Atkins MacNeil (1866–1947), American sculptor
- Hugh MacNeil (1860–1924), New Zealand cricketer, golfer and businessman
- Hugh Livingstone Macneil (1850–1901), Canadian pioneer ranch and town developer
- Ian MacNeil (ice hockey) (born 1977), Canadian ice hockey player
- Ian MacNeil (scenic designer) (born 1960), British scenic designer, the son of Robert MacNeil
- Ian Roderick Macneil (1929–2010), American legal scholar
- John MacNeil (1854–1896), Scottish/Australian evangelist
- Joseph MacNeil (1924–2018), Canadian Roman Catholic archbishop
- Karen MacNeil, American wine writer and educator
- Ken MacNeil (born 1975), Canadian darts player
- Kenzie MacNeil (1952–2021), Canadian songwriter and politician
- Kevin MacNeil, Scottish writer and poet
- Laine MacNeil (born 1996), Canadian actress
- Linda MacNeil (born 1954), American jeweller
- Maggie MacNeil (born 2000), Canadian swimmer
- Mick MacNeil (born 1958), Scottish songwriter and keyboardist
- Neil MacNeil (1923–2008), American journalist
- Rita MacNeil (1944–2013), Canadian folk singer
- Robert MacNeil (1931–2024), Canadian-American television journalist
- Russell MacNeil (1931–2018), Canadian politician
- Sarah Macneil (born 1955), Australian Anglican bishop
- Sheila MacNeil, Scottish tissue engineer
- Wade MacNeil (born 1984), Canadian musician
- William J. MacNeil (born 1946), Canadian real estate agent and politician

As first name

- MacNeil Mitchell (1904–1996), American lawyer and politician

== Fictional people ==
- Regan MacNeil, a character from William Peter Blatty's The Exorcist, played by Linda Blair in the 1973 film

== Other possible meanings ==
- The MacNeil/Lehrer Newshour, former name of The NewsHour with Jim Lehrer when Robert MacNeil co-anchored

== See also ==
- McNeil (disambiguation)
- McNeill (disambiguation)
- MacNeill
- McNeal
- MacNeal
- MacNeille
