= Charles McNeil =

Charles McNeil or Charlie McNeil is the name of:

- Charles McNeil (physician) (1881–1964), Scottish doctor
- Charles K. McNeil (1903–1981), American gambler
- Charlie McNeil (American football) (1936–1994), defensive back
- Charlie McNeil (footballer) (1963–2016), Scottish footballer

== See also ==
- Charlie McNeill (disambiguation)
