= Alexander Fletcher =

Alexander Fletcher or Alex Fletcher may refer to:

- Alexander Fletcher (British politician) (1929–1989), known as Sir Alex Fletcher, Conservative Member of Parliament (MP) in the UK
- Alexander Fletcher (colonial politician) (fl. late 18th century), Canadian politician
- Alexander Fletcher (minister) (1787–1860), British preacher, author of devotional works and children's religious education
- Alex Fletcher (actress) (born 1976), British actress
- Alex Fletcher (footballer) (born 1999), English football forward
- Alex Fletcher, a character played by Hugh Grant in the 2007 film Music and Lyrics
