= Weatherbird (disambiguation) =

Weatherbird is a cartoon character and strip in the St. Louis Post-Dispatch.

Weatherbird may also refer to:

- "Weather Bird", a composition by Joe Oliver
- Lockheed WC-130 "Weatherbird", a weather reconnaissance plane
- Howard McNeil (1920–2010), American meteorologist known as the "Old Weatherbird"
- R/V Weatherbird II, a vessel operated by the Florida Institute of Oceanography

== See also ==
- Gary Giddins, writer of the "Weather Bird" column in the Village Voice 1974-2003
