= Oblivion (Piazzolla) =

1982 composition by Astor Piazzolla

- Composition and ballad by Ástor Piazzolla
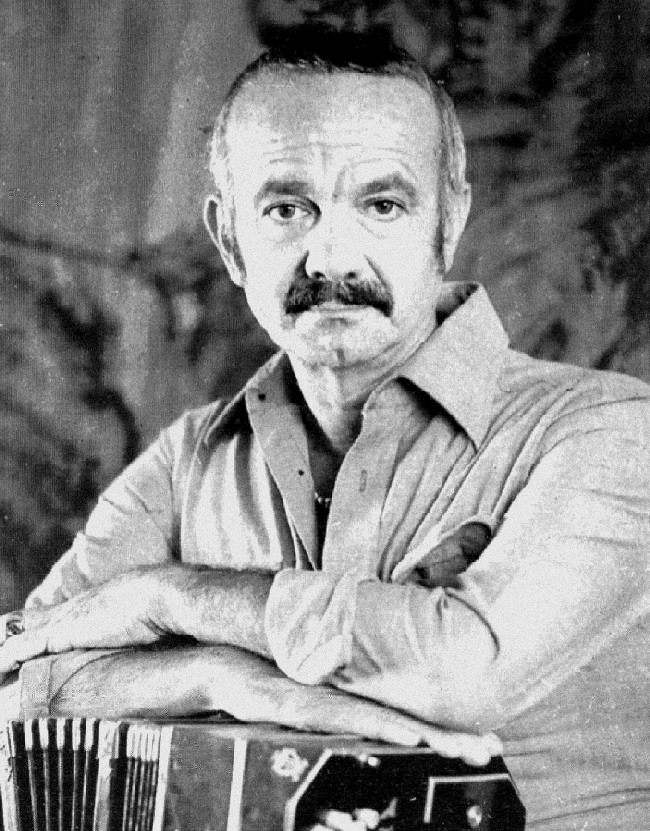
- Piazzolla with his bandoneon, 1971
- Other name: J'oublie
- Text: by David McNeil
- Based on: Henry IV film
- Composed: 1982
- Duration: 3 1/2 minutes

Oblivion is a 1982 composition by Argentine tango composer and bandoneon player Astor Piazzolla. It appeared in the 1984 Italian film Henry IV but gained wider recognition later that year when performed and recorded by Italian singer Milva with French lyrics. It features a passionate, melancholic melody built on a slow milonga rhythm with jazz-influenced harmonies. Running three and a half minutes, it has been extensively arranged for various instruments and recorded by numerous classical and jazz artists.

== History ==
Oblivion was written in 1982 when Piazzolla was in the United States. It is one of the five Piazzolla pieces that appeared in the 1984 film Henry IV by Marco Bellocchio. The film was not successful and its soundtrack did not attract attention at the time. It instead received much wider appreciation in Europe later the same year, when the piece was performed by the Italian singer Milva with French lyrics by David McNeil, the son of Marc Chagall. Titled J'oublie ("I forget"), it was recorded live at the Théâtre des Bouffes du Nord in Paris in September 1984 with Piazolla at the bandoneon and Pablo Ziegler the piano and released in France and Germany.

== Description ==
Piazzolla composed Oblivion during his mature period, when he had fully consolidated his distinctive style. Allan Kozinn suggested that the piece reveals Piazzolla's "more urbane, French-influenced side" in contrast to his exuberant works such as Libertango, while Michael Campbell argues that it exemplifies Piazzolla's efforts to elevate the tango closer to concert music. Emma Ross described the work as featuring "a passionate melody full of sorrowful desire" that straddles the line between "serious concert hall music and accompaniment to the tango dancers." Although commonly described as a "slow tango" or "tango-based", Bachtrack's David Karlin contended that Oblivion is "not a tango, but a slow song."

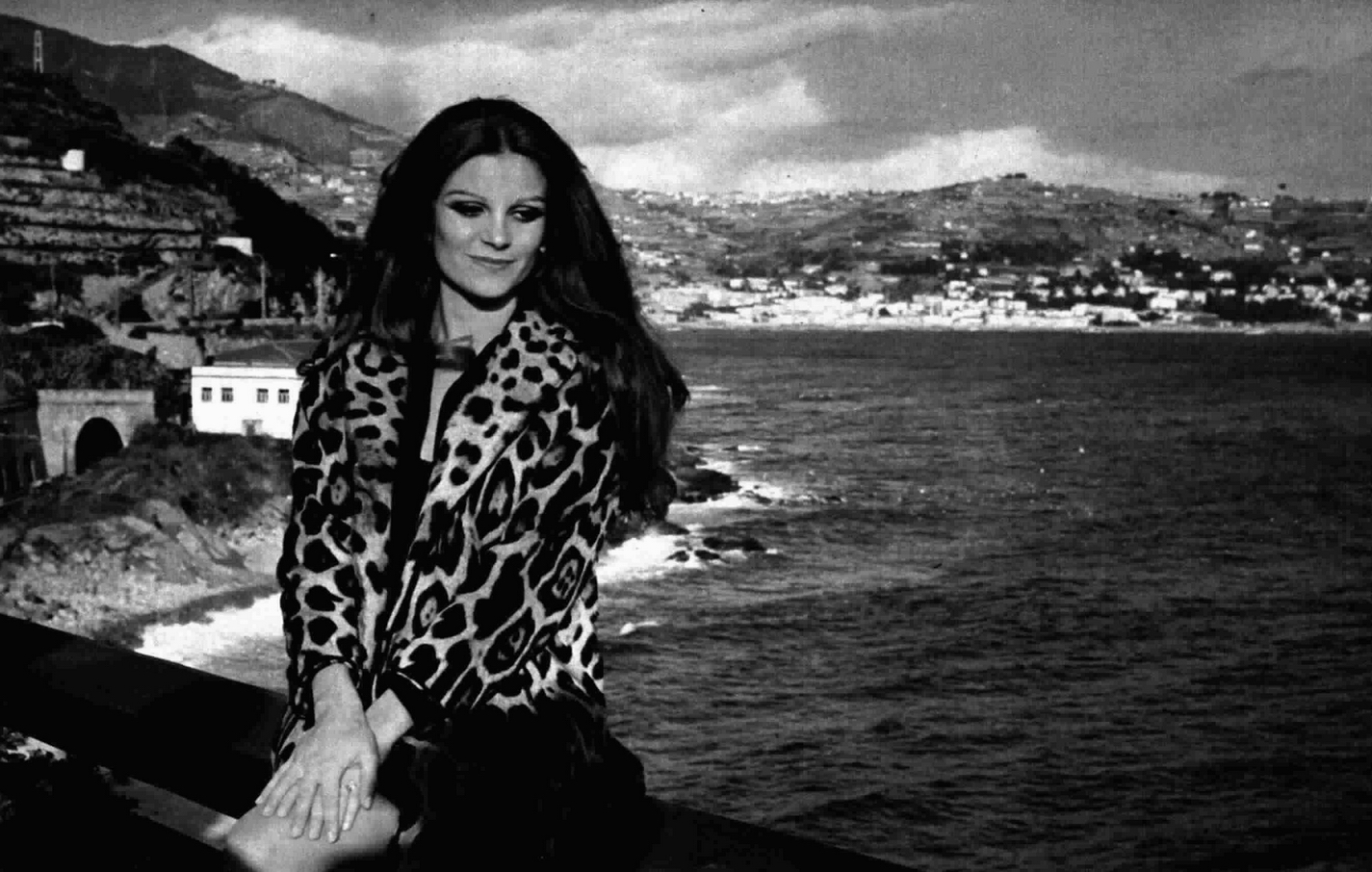
Milva in 1970

Oblivion, running three and a half minutes, is a sentimental ballad written in ternary (ABA) form and spans 64 bars in the key of C minor. The primary melodic motif consists of five descending notes of the C minor scale from dominant to tonic (G to C), with the melody gently descending as if sinking into melancholy. Both the A and B sections grow out of this opening idea of a long note followed by faster-moving notes, making extensive use of melodic sequence.

The composition maintains a 4/4 time signature throughout and is built upon a slow milonga rhythm that underpins the entire work, with the bass maintaining a constant tango rhythm as a "heartbeat". Piazzolla employs the characteristic rhythm of the urban milonga translated into this meter, experimenting with different groupings of eighth notes and incorporating rhythmic variations such as triplets of quarter notes in the second section. His creation of a slow-tempo milonga broke with the long-standing tango convention that "milonga equals an up-tempo piece," representing another expression of his uniquely new vision of tango. Harmonically, the work features progressions typical of jazz, including major sevenths, minor sevenths, suspended fourths on dominant chords, and flattened fifths, while maintaining a foundation based on I-IV-V progressions with a rich harmonic palette that has been described as creating an inexpressibly beautiful sound world.

The work is scored for strings (violins, cello, double bass), bandoneón, and bells, with Piazzolla himself performing the bandoneón part in the original recording. His performance style is notably expressive and vocal-like, dancing around the beat with freedom—anticipating and lagging behind—while extracting a great variety of sounds and dynamics from the bandoneón. The melodies are relatively straightforward in construction, relying predominantly on sustained notes linked together into single long phrases, with Piazzolla's playing creating a spontaneous quality reminiscent of the expressive devices of blues and jazz musicians.

== Critical reception ==
Oblivion has been received largely positively by critics. Robert Siegel called it "a lovely, beautiful piece." Writing for Gramophone, Andrew Farach-Colton called it "exquisitely melancholic." Stephanie von Buchau called it "the most beautiful tune written in the 20th century." Other critics have found it "sensuous", "sweetly melancholic", "haunting", "nostalgic", "bittersweet", and "atmospheric." Bachtrack’s David Karlin suggested that it "overflows with thoughts of what might have been," describing it as "a tune which never fails to bring tears to my eyes. I was in floods by the end, yet uplifted." St. Martin's Abbey described it as "a haunting piece that exudes isolation and impassioned eloquence in a most gripping way." Brian Torosian suggested that it "offers the serenity of a peaceful café scene." Ivan March was critical, finding it "a disarmingly simple, romantically languorous melody", which is "hardly exploring the end of existence."

== Arrangements and recordings ==
Oblivion has been extensively arranged for various instrumental combinations. Common arrangements include versions for violin, cello, oboe and orchestra, string quartet, and numerous adaptations for solo instruments (e.g. piano, clarinet) with standard accompaniment such as symphonic or chamber orchestras. The piece's structural clarity and rhythmic foundation have made it particularly amenable to diverse instrumental interpretations.

Cellist Yo-Yo Ma and pianist Kathryn Stott performed it in 2014 at London's Wigmore Hall. Among its notable classical recordings are those by violinist Joshua Bell and bandoneón player Carel Kraayenhof (2009), Charles Dutoit conducting the Montreal Symphony Orchestra with bandoneon player Daniel Binelli (2000), cellist Gautier Capuçon with the Paris Chamber Orchestra (2020).

The piece, recorded with Ettore Stratta conducting, received a Grammy nomination for Best Instrumental Composition in 1993.

Outside classical circles, it has been recorded by multiple jazz musicians, namely accordionist Richard Galliano (2000), violinist Regina Carter (2003), clarinetist Paquito D'Rivera (2009), and trumpeters Arturo Sandoval (2010), Chris Botti (2012), Herb Alpert (2013).
