= Clan MacNeil =

Highland Scottish clan

- Clann Nèill; Clann 'ic Nèill; Clann 'ic Nìll
- Motto: Buaidh no bas also translated as "Conquer or Die"; Vincer vel mori also translated as "Victory or Death"

Profile
- Region: Highland and Islands
- District: Western Isles
- Plant badge: Dryas

Chief
- Roderick Wilson Macneil of Barra
- The Macneil of Barra, Chief of Clan Niall and 27th of Barra, Baron of Barra
- Historic seat: Kisimul Castle
Clan branches
MacNeil of Barra
MacNeill of Gigha/Colonsay
Allied clans
Clan MacDonald

Clan MacNeil, also known in Scotland as Clan Niall, is a highland Scottish clan. According to their early genealogies and some sources they are descended from Eógan mac Néill and Niall of the Nine Hostages. Despite the long-held belief that the MacNeil (McNeil, McNeill, MacNeill) clan are descended from an Irish king or prince, DNA tests have shown that they are descended from Vikings and have no Irish blood at all. The clan is particularly associated with the Outer Hebridean island of Barra. The early history of Clan MacNeil is obscure. The clan claims to descend from the legendary Irish King Niall of the Nine Hostages, who is counted as its first chief. The clan takes its name from a Niall who lived in the 13th or early 14th century and who belonged to the same dynastic family of Cowal and Knapdale as the ancestors of the Lamonts, MacEwens of Otter, Maclachlans, and the MacSweens. While the clan is centred in Barra in the Outer Hebrides, there are (McNeill/MacNeill)s in Argyll that some historians have speculated may have been a more senior line, or possibly unrelated. According to Scots law, the chief of Clan MacNeil is the chief of all MacNeil(l)s.

== History ==
=== Origins ===
==== MacNeils of Barra ====
Despite the long-held belief that the McNeil (MacNeil, McNeill, MacNeill) clan are descended from an Irish king or prince, DNA tests have shown that they are descended from Vikings and have no Irish blood at all.

===== Traditional origin =====
The MacNeils of Barra claimed descent from a prince of the Uí Néill dynasty, Ánrothán Ua Néill, son of Áed, son of Flaithbertach Ua Néill, King of Ailech and Cenél nEógain, who died in 1036. Anrothan emigrated to Scotland in the 11th century. Through him the MacNeils of Barra claimed descent from the legendary Niall of the Nine Hostages. Anrothan is claimed as ancestor of several clans in the Argyll vicinity: Clan Lamont, Clan Maclachlan, Clan MacEwen of Otter, and also the Irish Sweeneys (MacSween). If MacNeils are indeed connected to Anrothan, then they appear to have been a junior branch of the family and were certainly overshadowed in the 13th century by the MacSweens, Lamonts and descendants of Gilchrist.

An opposing theory, proposed by Nicholas Maclean Bristol, is that they may descend from Neill Maclean who appears on exchequer rolls at a time when Tarbert Castle was being rebuilt by Robert the Bruce. In 1252 Neil Macneil, fifth of Barra, was described as a prince at a council of the Lord of the Isles. His son was Neil Og Macneil, who is believed to have fought for Robert the Bruce at the Battle of Bannockburn in 1314. An alternate hypothesis is a descent from a Bute family in service to the Clan MacRuari and granted Barra by them after the conquest of Bute by Scotland.

===== History =====
The earliest contemporary record of the Macneils of Barra is only in 1427, when Giolla Adhamhnáin Mac Néill (typically anglicised as Gilleonan Macneil) received a charter of Barra and Boisdale, from the Lord of the Isles, following the forfeiture of the previous Lordships of Uist and Garmoran, earlier that year.

Gilleonan's namesake, reckoned the twelfth chief, was one of the island lords who were tricked into meeting James V of Scotland at Portree, where they were promised safe conduct but instead were arrested and imprisoned. The MacNeil chief of Barra was not released until the king's death in 1542, when the Regent Moray wanted to use the island chiefs to counterbalance the growing power of the Clan Campbell. His son was amongst the chiefs who supported the last Lord of the Isles in his alliance with Henry VIII of England in 1545. The treaty they signed with the English as overlords proclaimed the ancient enmity between the chiefs of the isles and the kingdom of Scotland.

In 1579 the Bishop of the Isles made a complaint of molestation against the MacNeil chief of Barra. His son, the next chief, was denounced as a rebel by the Privy Council so many times that he was described as a "hereditary outlaw" and was known as the Turbulent or Ruari the Tatar. He has also been described as the last of the Viking raiders as he often raided from his Kisimul Castle. The king eventually arranged for his loyal vassals to extirpate and root out the chief of Clan MacNeil, whose own nephews captured him and placed him in chains.

During the Scottish Civil War of the 17th century the chief of Clan MacNeil, Neil Og, was appointed as Colonel of the Horse by Charles II of Scotland and fought at the Battle of Worcester in 1651. His grandson was Roderick Dhu the Black who received a Crown charter for all of the lands of Barra to be erected into a free barony. Roderick also led his clan at the Battle of Killiecrankie in 1689. He also supported the Jacobite rising of 1715 and as a result his two sons, Roderick and James, went into exile in France. Upon their father's death they returned but for his Jacobite sympathies, Roderick was consigned to a prison ship, the Royal Sovereign. He was then taken to London and not released until July 1747.

The clan prospered until the twenty-first chief, General Roderick Macneil, was forced to sell Barra in 1838.

Castle Sween. MacNeills from Argyll are thought to have been hereditary keepers of the castle in the 15th and 16th centuries

==== McNeills of Argyll (in Taynish, Gigha and Colonsay) ====
Arms of the McNeills of Gigha.

The origins of the Argyll MacNeills is also obscure. In the late 15th century, one MacNeill is recorded as the keeper of Castle Sween. In the mid 16th century, a certain Torquil MacNeill was known as the "chief and principal of the clan and surname of Maknelis". The 19th century scholar W.F. Skene considered Torquil to be the last of the hereditary MacNeill keepers of the castle. Skene believed that after Torquil's demise, the hereditary office passed to the MacMillans. During the time of Torquil, there are records of separate clans on Barra and Gigha. Skene did not consider Torquil to be a member of either of these clans, since both clans had chiefs of their own. A recent hypothesis make Torquil, son of Niall, living in 1440, the eponym of the clan, thus totally unrelated to the Barra MacNeils. His Norse name suggests his kindred were remnants of the lordship of Somerled, along with the Clan McCorquodale and Clan MacIver.

The chief of the Gigha MacNeills at this time was Neill MacNeill, who was killed in about 1530. His only daughter inherited his lands and handed them over to her illegitimate brother, Neill. According to historian John Bannerman, while the lands of the chief passed to his daughter, the chiefship passed over to Torquil who was her second cousin. Bannerman considered it likely that when Torquil died, the chiefship passed to the illegitimate Neill.

In 1553, this Neill sold the island to James MacDonald of Islay. Neill died without issue, and the next in line to the chiefship was another Neil, who obtained the lands of Taynish. His descendant Hector MacNeill of Taynish purchased Gigha in 1590. With the power of the Campbells growing and spreading out into the Inner Hebrides, the influence of the McNeills of Gigha decreased. At about this time the MacNeils on more remote island of Barra, far removed of Campbell power, began to grow in prominence and for a long time since have been regarded as Chief of the Clan and Name. Descending from this branch were the MacNeils of Colonsay who obtained Colonsay in 1700 and owned it until 1904 when it was sold by the heirs of Major General Sir John Carstairs McNeill. According to Moncreiffe, there is reason to believe that historically this branch was superior to the current chiefs of the Clan MacNeil. There is even a school of thought that there is no relation at all between this branch of McNeills to that of Barra. However, according to a 1962 decree by the Lord Lyon, the chiefs of MacNeil of Barra are chiefs of the whole name of MacNeil by Scots law until such time as the MacNeils of Colonsay acquire a Chief of their own. The last Clan Chief of the Clan McNeill of Colonsay was Alexander Malcolm McNeill who was born in New Zealand in 1899 and Matriculated his Arms in 1972. He held the title until his death in 1988. His son John Duncan McNeill became Head of the Clan on his father's death but did not apply to matriculate his own Arms. Duncan's eldest daughter, Deborah Jane McNeill, has petitioned the Lord Lyon to become the next Clan Chief of the Clan McNeill of Colonsay.

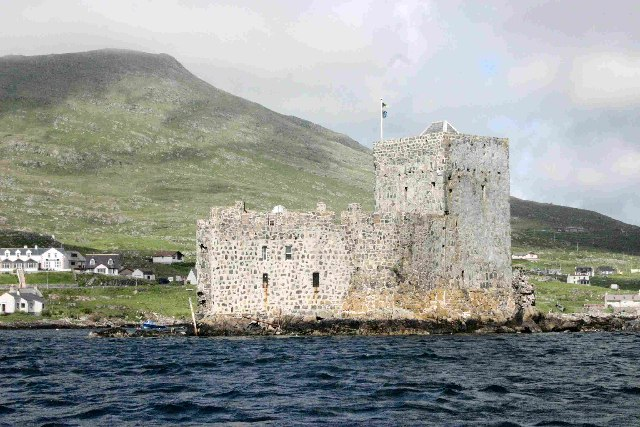
Kisimul Castle located in Castlebay, Barra is the current seat of the Chief of Clan MacNeil.

=== Modern Clan Macneil ===
The 18th and 19th centuries saw severe hardship to Clan MacNeil clansfolk. During this era there was mass clearance from Barra to Canada, Australia, New Zealand, and the United States. During the chiefship of Colonel Roderick (c.1755–1822) Barra suffered its first mass clearances. Ironically the chief described himself as a melieuratier (an "improver"). One mass exodus of Barra folk was led by Gilleonan, elder son of the chief. This consisted of 370 Catholic Barra folk (about 75 families in total) who emigrated in August to Pictou, Nova Scotia. In 1838, after going broke, Colonel Roderick's son and heir, Lieutenant General Roderick MacNeil of Barra, sold Barra to Colonel Gordon of Cluny. When Roderick died in 1863 the chiefship passed to a cousin (descendant of Gilleonan) who had emigrated during the mass emigrations to Canada in 1802.

Robert Lister MacNeil was born in 1889. An American citizen and a trained architect, he succeeded the chiefship of Clan MacNeil in 1915. In 1937 he was able to purchase Barra and the ruinous Kisimul Castle largely using the money from his second wife. Immediately he began work restoring the castle, aided in part by funds from a British Government grant. By his death in 1970 he had completed the restoration of the castle, ancient seat of the chiefs of the clan. In 2001 the castle was leased to Historic Scotland for one thousand years at the rent of £1 per year and a bottle of Talisker whisky. In October 2004 the chief handed over 3,600 hectares, comprising almost all of his estate on Barra to Scottish Ministers. The current chief of Clan MacNeil is Roderick Wilson MacNeil of Barra, The MacNeil of Barra, Chief of Clan Niall and 26th of Barra, also Baron of Barra. The chief is a member of the Standing Council of Scottish Chiefs. The current chief, while a United States citizen, lives in Edinburgh, Scotland.

Regarding the ascent of the 45th chief (Robert Lister Macneil), The Arms of the Scottish Bishoprics (1917) states:

"In 1914 Roderick Ambrose MacNeil, Chief of the MacNeils of Barra, died in the United States of America, being still a British citizen, leaving two sons. Paul Humphrey MacNeil, the elder son, in his father's lifetime renounced his allegiance to the British Crown and became an American citizen; in consequence of this his father in 1913 nominated his second son, Robert Lister MacNeil, the petitioner, to succeed him as Chief of the Clan, and assigned to him the arms pertaining to the Chief. Robert Lister MacNeil therefore petitioned the Lyon King to grant him the arms recorded by General Roderick MacNeil in 1824, which were borne by his (the petitioner's father), Roderick Ambrose MacNeil."

== Clan symbols ==
=== Crest badges ===
Clan members who wish to show their allegiance to a particular clan and chief can wear a crest badge. Scottish crest badges usually contain the heraldic crest and heraldic motto of the chief of the clan. While clan members may wear the badge, the crest and motto within it are the heraldic property of the chief alone. A crest badge suitable for a clan member of Clan MacNeil contains the crest: on a chapeau gules furred ermine, a rock proper. The motto upon the badge is: buaidh no bas, which translates from Scottish Gaelic as "to conquer or die", or "victory or death").

Though not a clan in its own right, MacNeil(l)s who consider themselves of the Colonsay "branch" have used the following crest badge to distinguish themselves from the Barra "branch". This crest badge contains the crest: an armoured dexter arm with dagger; and the motto: vincere aut mori (also written as vincere vel mori), which translates from Latin as "conquer or die".

=== Clan badge ===
Another symbol used by clan members is a clan badge, or sometimes called a plant badge. The original clan badges were merely plants worn in bonnets or hung from a pole or spear. Today, the clan badge attributed to Clan MacNeil is dryas. Trefoil has also been attributed to the clan, however this clan badge may actually be attributed to the McNeills of Gigha, a branch of Clan MacNeil. Trefoil has also been attributed to the Lamonts, another clan in Argyl. The Lamonts and MacNeils/McNeills both claim descent from the same O'Neill who settled in Scotland in the Middle Ages.

=== Tartan ===
There have been several tartans associated with the name MacNeil / MacNeill. However, in 1997 the chief of Clan MacNeil directed members of the clan that there were only two tartans that he recognised as "clan tartans". These were: MacNeil of Barra and MacNeil of Colonsay. The MacNeil of Barra tartan has been the standard MacNeil of Barra tartan for over a century.

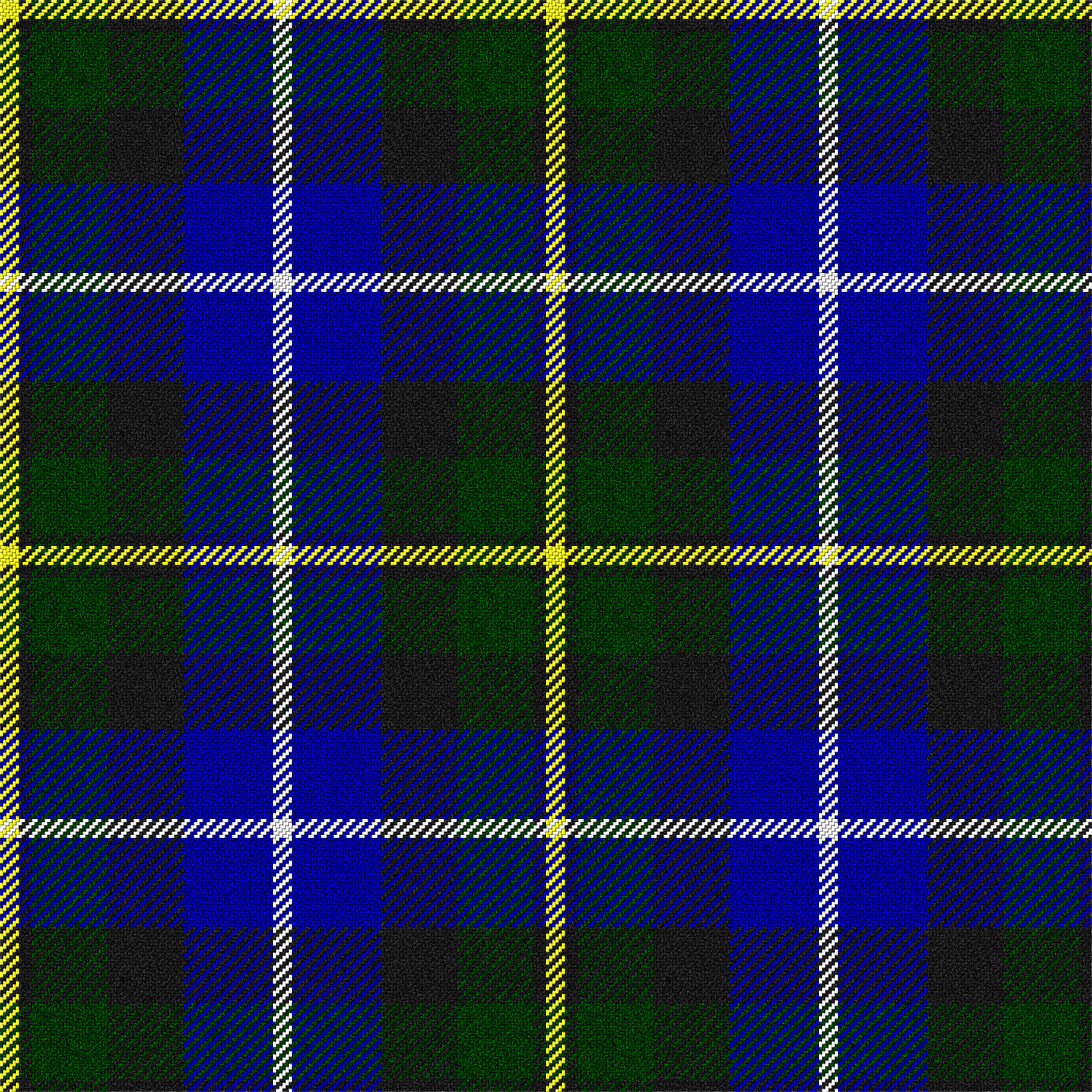
MacNeil of Barra tartan. Has been the standard MacNeil tartan for over a century.

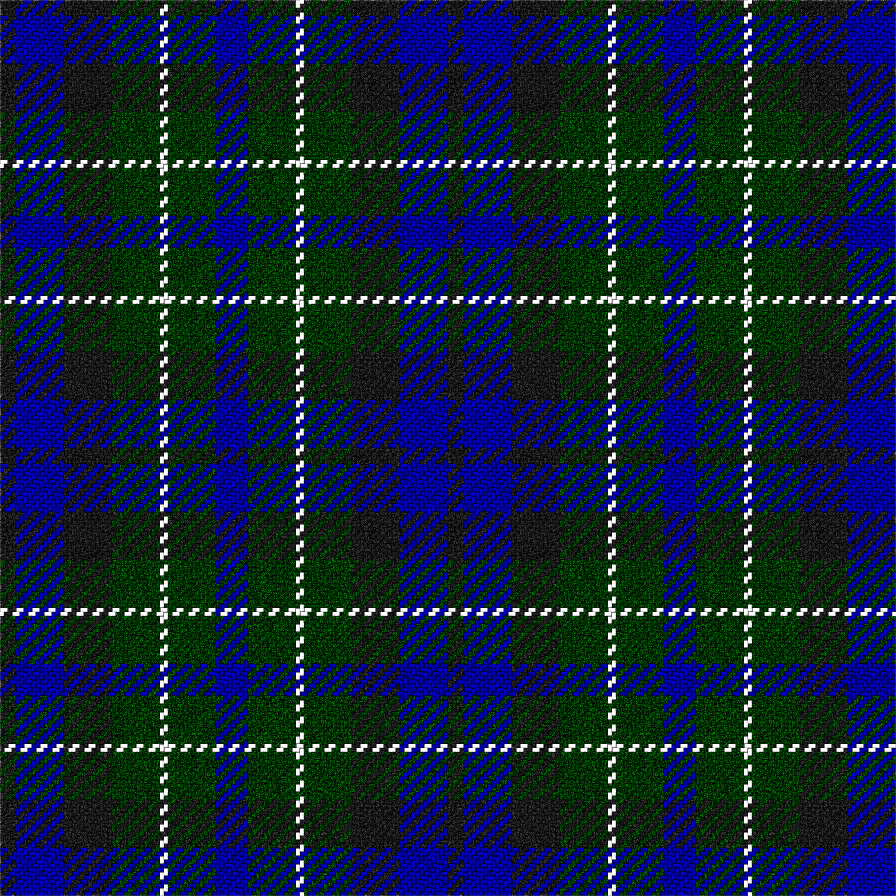
McNeill/MacNeill of Colonsay tartan. One of the two official clan tartans of Clan MacNeil.

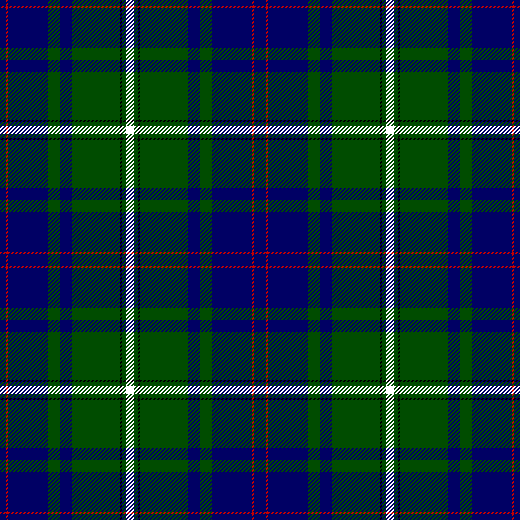
MacNeil tartan, as published in the Vestiarium Scoticum in 1842. The tartan is not recognised as a "clan tartan" by the current chief.

== Coat of arms ==
Coat of Arms of the chief of Clan MacNeil painted in the great hall of Kisimul Castle.

In Scotland, all coats of arms belong to a single person. The coat of arms typically attributed to Clan MacNeil belongs solely to the current chief of the clan. A depiction of the coat of arms is painted in the Great Hall of Kisimul Castle in Castlebay, Barra, Scotland.

This coat of arms is divided into quarters:

- Upper Left: Lion Rampant (mimicking the Royal Standard of the King of Scotland)
- Upper Right: Castle in the water (symbolizing Kisimul Castle in Castlebay)
- Lower Left: 3-masted ship (Representing either the seafaring nature of the clan or the migration of the clan from the Ulster, Ireland to Barra, Scotland
- Lower Right: Red Hand of Ulster surrounded by nine shackles representing Niall of the Nine Hostages

Surrounding the Coat of Arms:

- Crest: a Rock (same as on the clan badge)
- Chapeau: Red velvet cap lined with ermine, symbolic of a Baron
- Helm: Height of the Helmet is determined by rank
- Mantle: Fabric surrounding the Arms
- Supporters: Two lions rampant
- Compartment: The base of the Arms, made of Dryas flowers (the clan badge)

== Distribution ==
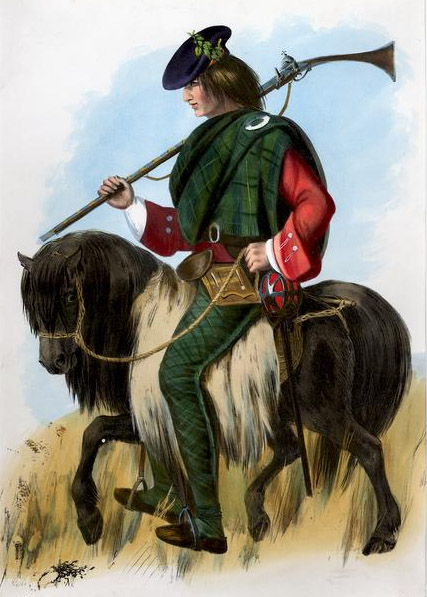
Mac Neil – a romanticized Victorian era plate illustrated by R. R. McIan.

The topic of who is a MacNeil can be a complicated one. By convention, anyone descended from a member of Clan MacNeil can claim membership. Because of the history of slavery in the United States and the Caribbean, however, many African-Americans may bear a MacNeil surname. Because it was not uncommon for a female slave to bear her slave-master's child, several African-American MacNeils may have legitimate descent from a MacNeil, however such descent can rarely be proven, and most African-American MacNeils remain uninvolved with clan activities and do not claim descent from the clan. Generally speaking, Caucasians with MacNeil surnames number between 40,000 and 80,000 worldwide.

=== In England, Wales, and the Isle of Man ===
source: UK National Statistics Database 2002

- McNeil: 3,522 (rank:2262)
- McNeill: 4,212 (rank:1909)
- MacNeil: 314 (rank:15845)
- MacNeill: 286 (rank:16904)

Sizable populations also exist in Scotland, Ireland, Canada, France, Australia, and New Zealand

=== In the United States ===
- McNeil: 33,239 (rank:961) (source: 2000 US Census)
- McNeill: 22,383 (rank:1387) (source: 1990 US Census)
- McNeal: 8,928 (rank:1723) (source: 2010 US Census)
- MacNeil: 2,487 (rank:8716) (source: 1990 US Census)
- McNiel: (rank:14781) (source: 2010 US Census
- McNeilly: (rank:16430) (source: 1990 US Census)
- MacNeill: (rank:28690) (source: 1990 US Census)
- MacNeal: 540 (rank:36525) (source: 2010 US Census)
- McNeillie: 107 (Rank:181724) (source: 2020 US Census)

== Chiefs of Clan MacNeil ==
The chiefs of Clan MacNeil are reckoned from Niall Noigíallach (Niall of the Nine Hostages), from whom all the MacNeil chiefs claim descent. Rory MacNeil became the 47th chief in 2010.

#	Name	Notes	Year of death
1	Niall Noigíallach (Niall of the Nine Hostages)	High King of Ireland, member of the Connachta dynasty, and ancestor of the Uí Néill dynastic family. Married to Rignach.	405
2	Eógan mac Néill	King of Aileach and Prince of Ulster, ancestor of the Cenél nEógain dynasty and their septs (O'Neill, O'Docherty, O'Boyle, MacNeill, etc.). Founded the kingdom of Tír Eógain in the 5th century. Married to Indorb Fionn 'the White'.	465
3	Muiredach mac Eógain	King of Aileach and Prince of Ulster. Married to Eirc.	480
4	Muirchertach mac Muiredaig	High King of Ireland in 487, King of Aileach. Married to Duaibhseach.	
5	Domnall mac Muirchertaig	High King of Ireland in 559, King of Aileach	561
6	Áed Uaridnach	High King of Ireland in 599, King of Aileach	607
7	Máel Fithrich mac Áedo	King of Aileach, Prince of Ulster	626–630
8	Máel Dúin mac Máele Fithrich	King of Aileach, Prince of Ulster. Married to Cacht.	706
9	Fergal mac Máele Dúin	High King of Ireland in 709, King of Aileach. Married to Athiocht.	718
10	Niall Frossach	High King of Ireland in 759, King of Aileach. Married to Eithne.	773
11	Áed Oirdnide mac Néill	High King of Ireland in 793, King of Aileach. Married to Maebh.	818
12	Niall Caille mac Áeda	High King of Ireland in 832, King of Aileach and Ulster. Married to Gormfhlaith Macdonell.	845
13	Aed Finliath	High King of Ireland in 861, King of Aileach and Ulster. Married to Máel Muire, daughter of Kenneth MacAlpin, King of Scots.	878
14	Niall Glúndub	High King of Ireland in 878, King of Aileach and Ulster. Married to Gormflaith.	916
15	Muirchertach mac Néill (Muirceartach na Cochall Croiceann)	High King of Ireland in 937, King of Aileach and Ulster	943
16	Domnall ua Néill	High King of Ireland in 954, King of Aileach and Ulster	978
17	Muirceartach na Midhe	Prince of Ulster and Tyrone	975
18	Flaithbertach Ua Néill	King of Aileach and Ulster and Prince of Tyrone	
19	Aodh Athlamh	King of Aileach and Ulster and Prince of Tyrone	
20	Aodh Aonrachan	King of Aileach, Prince of Aileach and Argyll, resigned kingship to his brother Domhnall in 1033.	aft 1047
21	Niall of the Castle	Prince of Argyll and the Norse Council of the Isles. Began construction of Kisimul Castle.	
22	Aodh	Prince of the Norse Council of the Isles	aft 1090
23	Donald	Prince of the Norse Council of the Isles	
24	Muirceartach	Prince of the Norse Council of the Isles	
25	Niall	Prince of the Norse Council of the Isles	aft 1263
26	Niall Og	Received a charter for Barra from Robert the Bruce	aft 1314
27	Muirceartach		
28	Roderick	Married Marjory, daughter of Donald of Islay, Lord of the Isles. Roderick witnessed a charter whereby Donald conveyed lands to Hector Maclean of Duart in 1409.	aft 1409
29	Gilleonan Roderick Muchard Macneil	Received a charter for Barra from Alexander, Lord of the Isles, in 1427. Married to Fynvola (Flora) MacLeod, daughter of Iain Borb MacLeod (6th chief of Clan MacLeod).	aft 1427
30	Roderick		
31	Gilleonan		aft 1495
32	Gilleonan		
33	Gilleonan		aft 1578
34	Roderick Og	Married to Mary MacLeod, the 10th chief and first female chief of Clan MacLeod	
35	Roderick "the Turbulent"	Married to a woman from Clan MacLean of Dowart (Duart) and later to a woman named Marion MacDonald. The children from these marriages fought over the title of chief of Clan MacNeil	aft 1601
36	Niall Og	Married to Margaret MacLean	aft 1651
37	Gilleonan	Married to Catherine MacDonald	
38	Roderick Dhu	Baron of Barra. Married to Isobel (Isabella) MacLeod.	1715
39	Roderick "Dove of the West"	Baron of Barra. Married to Alice MacLeod.	1763
40	Roderick "the Gentle"	Baron of Barra. Married to Jean Cameron.	1822
41	Roderick "the General"	Baron of Barra; lost the barony and the estate of Barra in 1838. Married to Isabella Brownlow. When he died, the chiefship passed to his first cousin (a great-great grandson of Roderick Dhu) who had emigrated to Canada during the mass emigrations in 1802.	1863
42	Donald McGougan Macneil	Baron of Barra	1880
43	Iain Macneil	Baron of Barra	1893
44	Roderick Ambrose MacNeil	Baron of Barra. Bequeathed the title of chief to his second son, Robert Lister.	1914
45	Robert Lister MacNeil (Photo)	Baron of Barra. An American. Bought the Barra estate in 1937 and restored Kisimul Castle.	1970
46	Ian Roderick MacNeil (Photo)	Baron of Barra. An American-born, Harvard-educated law professor. Gifted Kisimul Castle to Historic Scotland for 1,000 years in 2001 and gifted the estate of Barra to Scottish Ministers in 2004. Married to Nancy Wilson of Ottawa, Canada	2010
47	Roderick "Rory" Wilson MacNeil	Baron of Barra. Married to Sau Ming Kwan of Hong Kong.	
48			

== See also ==
- McNeil
- McNeill
- MacNeil
- MacNeill
- McNeal
- MacNeal
- MacNeille
- Victory or Death
- McNeil (surname)
- The Barra MacNeils

== Footnotes ==
1.There are more than one thousand possible spellings of the name MacNeil.
