= John MacNeill =

John MacNeill may refer to:

- J. G. Swift MacNeill (1849–1926), Irish Protestant Nationalist politician and MP, and professor and author of law
- John Benjamin Macneill (1793–1880), Irish civil engineer
- John F. MacNeill (1870–1962), physician and political figure on Prince Edward Island
- Eoin MacNeill (John McNeill, 1867–1945), Irish scholar, Irish language enthusiast, nationalist, and politician
- John MacNeill, High Sheriff of Antrim in 1843 under Queen Victoria
- John MacNeill, mechanical engineer for the Florida Automatic Computer
- John MacNeill, football player, see list of Michigan State Spartans in the NFL Draft
- John MacNeill, president of the Baptist World Alliance 1928–1934

== See also ==
- John McNeill (disambiguation)
- John McNeil (disambiguation)
