= Donald McNeil =

Donald McNeil may refer to:

- Donald McNeil (footballer) (born 1958), Scottish footballer
- Donald G. McNeil Jr. (born 1954), American journalist
- Donald C. MacNeil (1924–1978), Canadian politician
- Don McNeil (journalist) (1945-1968), journalist for the Village Voice
- Don McNeil (shot putter) (born 1918), American shot putter, 1940 All-American for the UCLA Bruins track and field team

== See also ==
- Don McNeill (disambiguation)
- Don McNeal (born 1958), American football player
