= John MacNeil =

Australian writer

- Born: 1854; Scotland
- Died: August 1896 (aged 41–42); Australia

John MacNeil (1854 – August 1896), was a Presbyterian author and evangelist in Australia. He is best known for his 1894 book, The Spirit-Filled Life.

== Life ==
MacNeil was born into a Presbyterian family in Scotland, but was brought up in Ballarat, Victoria. He studied theology at New College, Edinburgh and was ordained in 1879. Shortly afterwards he was introduced to the Higher Life movement.

He experienced "an anointing of the Holy Spirit" and in 1881 began evangelistic ministry. Poor health, however, hindered his itinerant work until he recovered after laying on of hands by an Anglican minister. He then toured Australia, seeing many people turn to Jesus.

In 1890, together with a few others, he formed a prayer group which came to be known as "The Band". They met regularly to pray for revival. They also focused strongly on the need for an infilling of the Holy Spirit, and prayed for "the full Baptism of the Holy Spirit for themselves and for all ministers, officers and members of the Churches."

From their prayer times came a decision to hold a Keswick-style convention in Geelong, with George Grubb, who had addressed Keswick Conventions in England, as the primary speaker, along with MacNeil, Webb and others.

In 1896 MacNeil toured Queensland a final time. At the end of his tour, in late August, he collapsed and died in a city shop.

Mikey Lynch describes MacNeil as "that kind of evangelist which seems to pop up in every generation: someone who ruffles feathers and pushes boundaries. His biography contains many fond, harsh and perplexed criticisms of his manner; and just as many apologies, concessions and defences of him."

== Bibliography ==
=== Works ===
- The Spirit-Filled Life, Chicago: Moody Press (1894)
- Some One is Coming, London: Marshall Brothers (1896)
- Honey Gathered and Stored, London: Marshal Brothers (1897)
- Even So, Come, Chicago: Fleming H. Revell (1897)

=== Biography ===
- John MacNeil, Late Evangelist in Australia, by Hannah MacNeil, London: Marshall Brothers (1897)
