= William McNeill =

William McNeill may refer to:

- William H. McNeill (1917–2016), Canadian-born American historian
- William McNeill (politician) (fl. 1830s), Canadian politician
- William Simpson McNeill (1814–1902), Canadian politician
- William McNeill (philosopher) (born 1961), American professor of philosophy
- William Henry McNeill (1803–1875), American captain and discoverer of Victoria Harbour
- William McNeill Whistler (1836–1900), American Confederate soldier and surgeon
- Billy McNeill (1940–2019), Scottish football player and manager
- Billy McNeill (ice hockey) (1936–2007), Canadian ice hockey player

== See also ==
- William J. MacNeil, politician in Newfoundland
