= Don McNeill =

Don McNeill may refer to:

- Don McNeill (radio presenter) (1907–1996), American radio personality
- Don McNeill (tennis) (1918–1996), American tennis player
- Donald Burgess McNeill (1911–2010), physics and transport history writer
- Donald McNeill (footballer), see 1894–95 Manchester City F.C. season

== See also ==
- Donald McNeil (disambiguation)
- Don McNeal (born 1958), American football player
