= John McNeil (disambiguation) =

John McNeil (1813-1891) was Union army officer.

John McNeil may also refer to:

- John McNeil Jr. (1784–1850), U.S. Army officer
- John Winfield Scott McNeil (1817–1837), U.S. Army officer
- John McNeil (musician) (1948–2024), American jazz trumpeter
- John McNeil (footballer, born 1959), Scottish footballer (Morton)
- Johnny McNeil, Scottish football player and manager (Bury, Torquay United)

== See also ==
- John McNeill (disambiguation)
- John MacNeill (disambiguation)
- Ian Niall (1916–2002), pen name of Scottish writer John McNeillie
