= Charlie McNeill =

Charlie McNeill may refer to:

- Charlie McNeill (bowls), Australian lawn bowls player
- Charlie McNeill (footballer), English footballer

== See also ==
- Charles McNeil (disambiguation)
