= George Dalrymple =

George Dalrymple may refer to:

- George R. Dalrymple (died 1851), Scottish-born businessman and political figure on Prince Edward Island
- George Elphinstone Dalrymple (1826–1876), explorer, public servant and politician in Queensland
