= McNeil =

McNeil may refer to:

- McNeil, Arkansas
- McNeil, Caldwell County, Texas
- McNeil, Travis County, Texas
- McNeil Consumer Healthcare, a division of Kenvue, distributor of Tylenol
- McNeil High School, high school in Austin, Texas
- McNeil Island, Washington
- McNeil River, Alaska
- McNeil's Nebula
- Mount McNeil, a mountain in Yukon Territory, Canada
- Ortho-McNeil Pharmaceutical, American pharmaceutical manufacturer

== See also ==
- McNeil (surname)
- McNeill (disambiguation)
- MacNeill
- McNeal
- MacNeal
- MacNeille
