= Harold George Jerrard =

Physicist, sailor and councillor

Harold George Jerrard FInstP
- Born: 26 October 1921
- Died: 10 April 2013 (aged 91); Exeter
- Occupation: University lecturer
- Employers: Southampton University; Public Servant
- Known for: Physics textbooks; Mayor of Fareham

Harold George "Jerry" Jerrard (26 October 1921 – 10 April 2013) was a British physicist known for his books with Donald Burgess McNeill. His research concerned optics, and included reviving the theory of the Poincaré sphere for modeling the behavior of polarised light, 60 years after it was suggested by Henri Poincaré and then largely forgotten. He was a reader of physics at the University of Southampton, a professor of physics at Oklahoma State University–Stillwater, and a Fellow of the Institute of Physics. He also enjoyed sailing on the Solent, and served for 20 years in local politics in the Borough of Fareham, becoming leader of the borough council, mayor, and a member of the Hampshire County Council.

== Selected publications ==
=== Books ===
- Jerrard, H. G., and McNeill, D. B. (1960). Theoretical and Experimental Physics. United Kingdom: Chapman & Hall.
- Jerrard, H. G., and McNeill, D. B. (1963). A Dictionary of Scientific Units, Including Dimensionless Numbers and Scales. United Kingdom: Chapman & Hall. 6th ed., 1992.

=== Articles ===
- Jerrard, H. G. (January 1948), "Optical compensators for measurement of elliptical polarization", Journal of the Optical Society of America, 38 (1): 35–59, doi:10.1364/JOSA.38.000035
- Jerrard, H. G. (August 1954), "Transmission of light through birefringent and optically active media: the Poincaré sphere", Journal of the Optical Society of America, 44 (8): 634–640, doi:10.1364/JOSA.44.000634
