= Mac Néill =

Origin
- Region of origin: Ireland

Other names
- Variant form: O'Neill

mac Néill is an Irish surname. Notable people with the surname include:

- Áed Oirdnide (Áed mac Néill, died 819), son of Niall Frossach
- Áed Findliath (Áed mac Néill, died 879), son of Niall Caille
- Cathal mac Néill (died 729), Irish king
- Coirpre mac Néill (died after 485), founder of the Cenél Coirpri
- Eógan mac Néill (died 465), Irish king
- Fiachu mac Néill (fl. 507–514), Irish king
- Fogartach mac Néill (died 724), Irish king
- Lóegaire mac Néill (died c. 462), son of Niall of the Nine Hostages
- Maine mac Néill (died 712), Irish king
- Muirchertach mac Néill (died 943), Irish king

== See also ==
- MacNeill
