= McNeill =

McNeill may refer to:

- McNeill (surname)
- McNeill, Mississippi, United States; an unincorporated community
- McNeill, West Virginia, United States; an unincorporated community
- Port McNeill, British Columbia, Canada; a town
- McNeill Bay (British Columbia), Canada
- McNeill HVDC Back-to-back station, Canada
- McNeill v. United States, 2011 United States Supreme Court case
- McNeill's law, describes the role of microbial disease in the conquering of people-groups
- McNeill's Rangers, independent Confederate military force
- Don McNeill's Breakfast Club, morning variety show on ABC radio

== See also ==
- McNeil (disambiguation)
- MacNeil
- MacNeill
- McNeal
- MacNeal
- MacNeille
