= Neil MacNeil =

American journalist

- Born: January 3, 1923; Bronx, New York, NY, U.S.
- Died: June 7, 2008 (aged 85); Bethesda, MD, U.S.
- Education: Harvard College
- Occupation: Journalist
- Employer(s): New York Times, United Press, TIME Magazine, National Public Television
- Notable work: Forge of Democracy: The House of Representatives, Dirksen: Portrait of a Public Man, The President’s Medal 1789-1977, The American Senate: An Insider's History
- Television: “MacNeil on Congress,” “Washington Week in Review”
- Awards: Dirksen Award for distinguished reporting on Congress, George Pendleton Prize for 2013

Neil MacNeil (January 3, 1923 in the Bronx, New York, NY – June 7, 2008 in Bethesda, MD) was an American journalist.

== Career ==
He began in journalism as a local reporter for The New York Times. In 1949, after graduating from Harvard College, he came to Washington as a congressional correspondent for United Press International. In 1958, he joined Time magazine where he worked for nearly 30 years reporting on Congress, and served as chief congressional correspondent. For Time, MacNeil reported many cover stories, including on such members of Congress as Sam Rayburn, Mike Mansfield, Lyndon Johnson, the Kennedy brothers (John, Robert, and Ted), Everett Dirksen, Gerald Ford, Hubert Humphrey, William Fulbright, Robert Byrd, and Howard Baker. He appeared on such programs as NBC’s Meet The Press and CBS’s “Face The Nation.”

For three years starting in 1964, MacNeil made a weekly report, "MacNeil on Congress", for the Eastern Educational Television Network, a program enlarged in 1967 into Washington Week in Review on National Public Television. He was a weekly regular on that program until 1978.

He wrote three books: Forge of Democracy: The House of Representatives, 1963; Dirksen: Portrait of a Public Man, 1970, and The President’s Medal 1789-1977, 1977, a study of presidential inaugural medals. At the time of his death, MacNeil was completing a fourth book, tentatively titled Call The Roll: A Candid History of the United States Senate.

After his death in June 2008, Oxford University Press contacted Richard A. Baker, historian emeritus of the Senate, and asked him to assist in completing this book. It was posthumously published under the title The American Senate: An Insider's History and was the winner of the Society for History in the Federal Government's George Pendleton Prize for 2013.

For many years he served on the executive committee of the Congressional Periodical Press Galleries. In 1980 he won the Dirksen Award for distinguished reporting on Congress.

In 1976, MacNeil served as chairman of the United States Assay Commission, a citizens' group annually appointed by the president to test the validity of the government's coinage, a commission originally created by George Washington during his administration and abolished in 1977 by President Carter as an economy measure.

== Personal ==
In 1939, as a boy of 16, MacNeil suffered a fractured skull in a batting practice accident, and after that he had to wear a special protective helmet made for him by the Davega Sports Company whenever batting, by odd chance one of the first batting helmets ever made, now housed at Baseball's Hall of Fame, Cooperstown, New York.

In 1976 and 1977 MacNeil was president of the Clan MacNeil Association of America.

Elected a member of the American Antiquarian Society, 1974, and the Massachusetts Historical Society, 1977, MacNeil served as a trustee of the Augustus Saint-Gaudens Historic Site, Cornish, New Hampshire, since 1975. He was a member of the National Press Club.
