= Walter Berry (politician) =

Canadian politician

Speaker of the Legislative Assembly of Prince Edward Island
- In office 1780–1784
- Preceded by: David Higgins
- Succeeded by: Alexander Fletcher

Personal details
- Citizenship: Canadian

Walter Berry was the speaker of Legislative Assembly of Prince Edward Island from 1780 to 1784. Berry was a slaveholder during the colonial era.
