= Sheila MacNeil =

Professor of Tissue Engineering

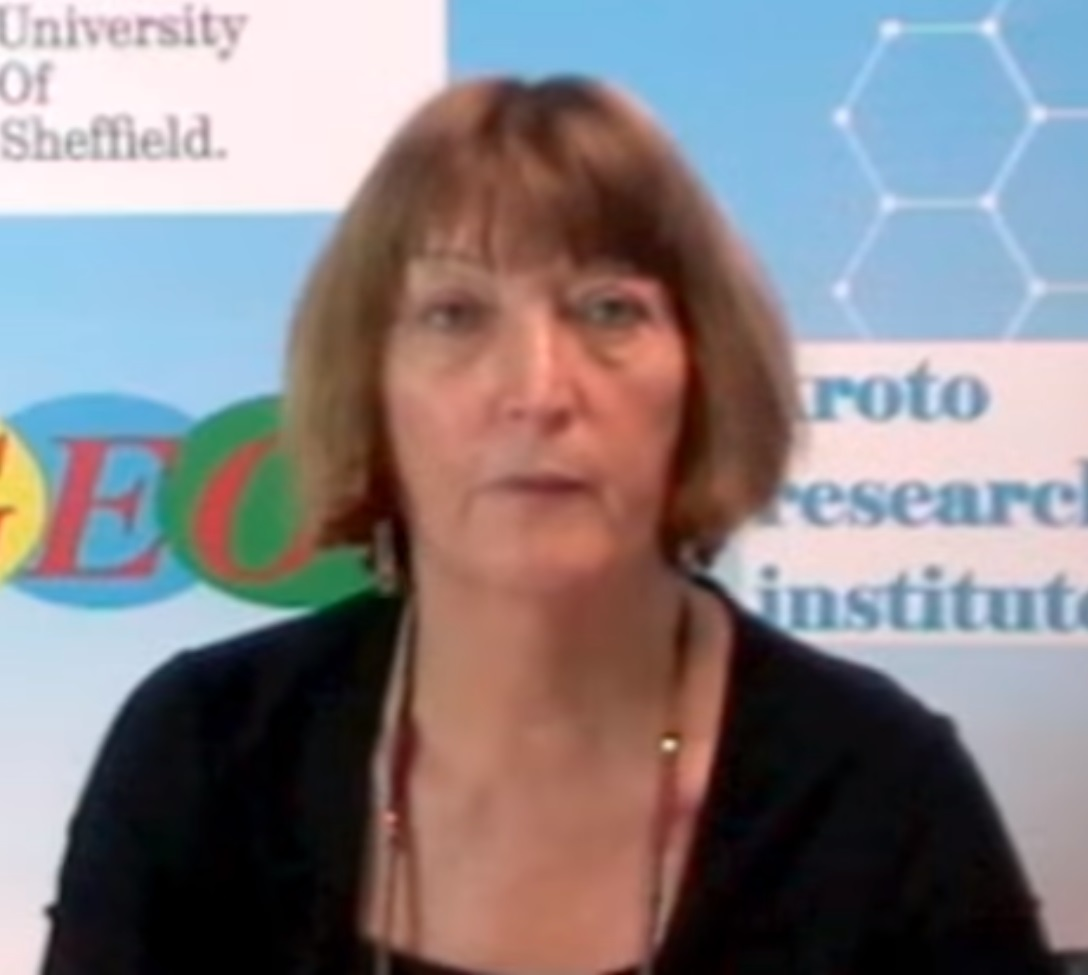
- MacNeil talks about her 2013 paper
- Education: University of Aberdeen; University of Sheffield
- Known for: Tissue engineering
- Scientific career
- Workplaces: University of Sheffield

Sheila MacNeil is a Professor of Tissue Engineering at the University of Sheffield. She works alongside NHS clinicians to use tissue engineered skin to benefit patients with burns, chronic ulcers and those recovering from surgery. She developed MySkin, skin bandages that are used to treat burns in 11 of 13 major UK burns units.

== Early life and education ==
MacNeil studied physiology at the University of Aberdeen. She earned a PhD in the endocrinology of manic depression from the University of Sheffield. Here she explored why certain rare earth metals can benefit patients with manic depression.

== Research and career ==
In 1992, MacNeil began to develop cytokeratin for patients with extensive burns in a Sheffield Hospital. She joined the University of Sheffield in 2000. MacNeil founded the Sheffield spinout company CellTran in 2000, and remained as Director until 2007. CellTran was taken over by York Pharma in 2008. In 2004 MacNeil and colleagues developed MySkin, living bandages made from healthy skin cells. They went on to explore how aminopropionitrile in sweet peas could be bound with polymers, and created CryoSkin. They were awarded over £2,500,000 in funding from the Engineering and Physical Sciences Research Council. The products were voted the Biomedical Product of the Year in 2008. MacNeil was appointed Deputy Director of the University of Sheffield Kroto Research Institute in 2005. She established the university's Bachelors and master's degrees in bioengineering in 2011, which were accredited in 2014. She is part of the University of Leeds Doctoral Training Centre for Tissue Engineering and Regenerative Medicine. She won the 2014 President's Prize from the UK Society for Biomaterials.

Alongside acting as Director for Interdisciplinary Programmes at the university, she continues to lead on innovations in healthcare. Working with Chris Chapple at the Sheffield Teaching Hospitals NHS Foundation Trust, MacNeil is developing biomaterials to repair tissues in the pelvic floor. They are also working on tissue engineered buccal mucosa to help scarring in the Urethra. She has worked with Wellcome Trust Affordable Healthcare for India programme to develop cell delivery membranes for corneal defects. MacNeil serves as an advisor for the New Zealand company Upside Biotechnologies. In 2017 she identified that certain sugars encourage blood vessel formation and can aid wound healing. She developed a new material for vaginal mesh which could release oestrogen and assist healing. She has over 464 peer-reviewed publications and has an H-index of 49.

In 2017 she was awarded the Medical Research Council Suffrage Science Award.

In 2018 Professor MacNeil was awarded the Institute of Materials, Minerals and Mining Chapman Medal, an award which is presented for "distinguished research in the field of biomedical materials, particularly with respect to biomaterials innovation."
