= Mikey Lynch =

Australian evangelist and blogger (born 1980)

Mikey Lynch (born 1980) is an Australian evangelist and blogger. He serves as Campus Director of the Fellowship of Christians at the University of Tasmania, a group associated with the Australian Fellowship of Evangelical Students. Prior to this he was senior pastor of Crossroads Presbyterian Church in Hobart.

Along with Al Stewart and Andrew Heard, Lynch is a director of the Geneva Push, an Australian church planting network.

Commenting on the inverted red crosses of the Dark Mofo Winter Festival public art installation, Lynch was reported as observing that "My immediate reaction was a bit of an eye roll — here we go, a shock jock statement that gets Christians grumpy. It's a religious symbol and so for some people it is precious, so of course, people are going to find that hurtful. For Christians, the cross is a symbol of shame and it's about God taking on shame for the salvation of the word, so there's a weird irony in getting offended by a symbol which in itself is offensive."

== Personal life ==
Lynch is married with three children. He studied at Scotch College, Melbourne before obtaining a Bachelor of Arts from the University of Tasmania.

== Books ==
- The Good Life in the Last Days (Matthias Media, 2018)
- The Vine Movement (Matthias Media, 2023)
