= List of Michigan State Spartans in the NFL draft =

This is a list of Michigan State Spartans football players in the NFL draft.

== Key ==
B	Back	K	Kicker	NT	Nose tackle
C	Center	LB	Linebacker	FB	Fullback
DB	Defensive back	P	Punter	HB	Halfback
DE	Defensive end	QB	Quarterback	WR	Wide receiver
DT	Defensive tackle	RB	Running back	G	Guard
E	End	T	Offensive tackle	TE	Tight end

== Selections ==
Year	Round	Pick	Overall	Player	Team	Position
1936	1	8	8	Sid Wagner	Detroit Lions	G
1936	4	5	32	Bob Allman	Chicago Bears	E
1937	9	9	89	Gordon Dahlgren	Green Bay Packers	G
1939	1	7	7	John Pingel	Detroit Lions	B
1939	8	1	61	Ole Nelson	Pittsburgh Steelers	E
1941	17	10	160	Stan McRae	Washington Redskins	E
1942	13	5	115	Tony Arena	Detroit Lions	C
1943	10	1	81	Jack Fenton	Detroit Lions	B
1943	15	5	135	Dick Kieppe	Cleveland Rams	B
1944	17	9	173	Hugh Davis	Pittsburgh Steelers	B
1944	23	9	239	Paul Carter	Pittsburgh Steelers	T
1944	24	5	246	Howard Beyer	New York Giants	C
1945	10	7	94	Frank Brogger	Washington Redskins	E
1945	24	10	251	Vincent Mroz	New York Giants	E
1946	4	2	27	Jack Breslin	Boston Yanks	B
1947	13	1	106	Walt Vezmar	Detroit Lions	G
1947	21	10	195	Russ Reader	Chicago Bears	B
1948	18	6	161	Ken Balge	Green Bay Packers	E
1948	23	4	209	Jim Zito	Boston Yanks	T
1948	30	2	277	Bob McCurry	Detroit Lions	C
1949	6	7	58	Warren Huey	Philadelphia Eagles	E
1950	1	8	8	Lynn Chandnois	Pittsburgh Steelers	B
1950	7	8	87	Ed Bagdon	Chicago Cardinals	G
1950	25	3	316	Frank Waters	Green Bay Packers	B
1950	25	4	317	Gene Glick	Detroit Lions	B
1950	28	6	358	Don McAuliffe	New York Giants	B
1951	3	7	33	Dorne Dibble	Detroit Lions	E
1951	3	11	37	Sonny Grandelius	New York Giants	B
1951	8	6	92	Hank Minarik	Pittsburgh Steelers	E
1951	10	9	119	Jesse Thomas	Boston Yanks	B
1951	23	9	276	Dean Thomas	Los Angeles Rams	T
1951	24	11	290	Dick Kuh	New York Giants	G
1952	1	13	13	Bob Carey	Los Angeles Rams	E
1952	2	11	24	Bill Hughes	Cleveland Browns	C
1952	3	6	31	Al Dorow	Washington Redskins	QB
1952	8	3	88	Don Coleman	Chicago Cardinals	G
1952	11	6	127	Orlando Mazza	Washington Redskins	E
1952	12	5	138	Marv McFadden	Pittsburgh Steelers	T
1952	14	2	159	Jack Morgan	Green Bay Packers	T
1952	18	9	214	Bill Carey	San Francisco 49ers	E
1952	21	10	251	Jim Creamer	New York Giants	C
1952	23	3	268	Frank Kapral	Green Bay Packers	G
1953	3	2	27	Paul Dekker	Washington Redskins	E
1953	4	10	47	Dick Tamburo	Cleveland Browns	C
1953	14	3	160	Ed Timmerman	Washington Redskins	B
1953	25	10	299	Jim Ellis	Cleveland Browns	B
1954	2	12	25	Jim Neaql	Detroit Lions	C
1954	5	1	50	Don Dohoney	Chicago Cardinals	E
1954	5	7	56	Billy Wells	Washington Redskins	B
1954	21	3	244	Rex Corless	New York Giants	B
1954	27	6	319	Tom Yewcic	Pittsburgh Steelers	QB
1954	28	2	327	Evan Slonac	Green Bay Packers	B
1955	5	4	53	Hank Bullough	Green Bay Packers	G
1955	6	12	73	Leroy Bolden	Cleveland Browns	B
1955	7	11	84	Bert Zagers	Detroit Lions	B
1955	15	5	174	Ellis Duckett	Pittsburgh Steelers	B
1955	24	9	286	Vic Postula	Philadelphia Eagles	B
1955	24	12	289	John Matsock	Cleveland Browns	B
1956	1	2	2	Earl Morrall	San Francisco 49ers	QB
1956	2	5	18	Norm Masters	Chicago Cardinals	T
1956	3	12	37	Bill Quinlan	Cleveland Browns	E
1956	5	10	59	Gary Lowe	Washington Redskins	B
1956	9	6	103	John Lewis	Baltimore Colts	E
1956	12	8	141	Jerry Planutis	Washington Redskins	B
1956	24	11	288	Sam Williams	Los Angeles Rams	DE
1956	30	8	357	Buck Nystrom	Washington Redskins	G
1957	1	7	7	Clarence Peaks	Philadelphia Eagles	B
1957	3	10	35	Dennis Mendyk	New York Giants	B
1957	5	11	60	Vic Zucco	Chicago Bears	B
1957	7	1	74	Tom Saidock	Philadelphia Eagles	T
1957	11	12	133	Pat Burke	New York Giants	G
1957	15	6	175	Dave Kaiser	Cleveland Browns	E
1957	25	4	293	Jim Hinesley	Pittsburgh Steelers	E
1958	1	3	3	Dan Currie	Green Bay Packers	C
1958	1	6	6	Walt Kowalczyk	Philadelphia Eagles	B
1958	4	12	49	Jim Ninowski	Cleveland Browns	QB
1958	5	4	53	Bob Jewett	Chicago Bears	E
1958	6	11	72	Jim Wulff	Cleveland Browns	B
1958	13	7	152	Tony Kolodziej	Los Angeles Rams	E
1958	13	10	155	Hal Dukes	San Francisco 49ers	E
1958	16	8	189	Archie Matsos	Baltimore Colts	G
1958	20	4	233	Les Rutledge	Chicago Bears	T
1958	24	6	283	Larry Harding	Los Angeles Rams	E
1958	28	11	336	Bill Boykin	Cleveland Browns	T
1959	3	11	35	Fran O'Brien	Cleveland Browns	T
1959	4	7	43	Blanche Martin	Los Angeles Rams	B
1959	5	11	59	Ellison Kelly	New York Giants	G
1959	6	12	72	Palmer Pyle	Baltimore Colts	T
1959	9	8	104	Larry Cundiff	Los Angeles Rams	T
1959	15	11	179	Bob Bercich	New York Giants	B
1960	20	3	231	Dean Look	Detroit Lions	QB
1961	1	12	12	Herb Adderley	Green Bay Packers	DB
1961	2	8	22	Fred Arbanas	St. Louis Cardinals	E
1961	7	7	91	Ike Grimsley	Baltimore Colts	RB
1961	8	6	104	Ed Ryan	Chicago Bears	B
1961	9	14	126	Wayne Fontes	Philadelphia Eagles	RB
1961	10	6	132	Jason Harness	Chicago Bears	E
1962	8	1	99	Ron Hatcher	Washington Redskins	RB
1962	8	6	104	Gary Ballman	Pittsburgh Steelers	B
1962	11	4	144	Larry Hudas	Dallas Cowboys	E
1962	18	1	239	Carl Charon	Washington Redskins	B
1963	1	4	4	Ed Budde	Philadelphia Eagles	T
1963	1	11	11	Dave Behrman	Chicago Bears	C
1963	2	8	22	Lonnie Sanders	Washington Redskins	DB
1963	2	9	23	Jim Kanicki	Cleveland Browns	T
1963	6	1	71	George Saimes	Los Angeles Rams	DB
1963	7	1	85	Bill Zorn	Los Angeles Rams	T
1963	8	12	110	Dave Herman	New York Giants	G
1963	10	9	135	Jim Bobbitt	Cleveland Browns	G
1963	13	12	180	Ernie Clark	Detroit Lions	LB
1964	2	6	20	Matt Snorton	Detroit Lions	E
1964	5	8	64	Ed Lothamer	Baltimore Colts	T
1964	6	7	77	Herman Johnson	Los Angeles Rams	B
1964	16	8	218	Roger Lopes	Baltimore Colts	RB
1964	18	12	250	Sherman Lewis	Cleveland Browns	RB
1965	2	11	25	Jerry Rush	Detroit Lions	T
1965	7	4	88	Dick Gordon	Chicago Bears	RB
1965	19	4	256	Lou Bobich	Chicago Bears	K
1966	2	7	23	Harold Lucas	St. Louis Cardinals	T
1967	1	1	1	Bubba Smith	Baltimore Colts	DT
1967	1	2	2	Clint Jones	Minnesota Vikings	RB
1967	1	5	5	George Webster	Houston Oilers	LB
1967	1	8	8	Gene Washington	Minnesota Vikings	WR
1967	6	13	146	Jeff Richardson	New York Jets	DE
1967	9	6	217	James Summers	Denver Broncos	DB
1967	9	21	232	Charlie Thornhill	Boston Patriots	DB
1967	14	17	358	Dick Kenney	Philadelphia Eagles	K
1968	4	1	84	Jess Phillips	Cincinnati Bengals	DB
1968	4	19	102	Drake Garrett	Denver Broncos	DB
1968	5	14	125	Dwight Lee	San Francisco 49ers	RB
1968	7	13	178	Joe Przybycki	Philadelphia Eagles	G
1968	9	26	245	Bob Apisa	Green Bay Packers	RB
1968	16	23	431	Jimmy Raye II	Los Angeles Rams	QB
1969	7	14	170	Al Brenner	New York Giants	DB
1970	5	6	110	Ron Saul	Houston Oilers	G
1970	7	21	177	Craig Wycinsky	Cleveland Browns	G
1970	8	22	204	Rich Saul	Los Angeles Rams	LB
1970	12	15	301	Frank Foreman	Green Bay Packers	WR
1970	13	24	336	Don Highsmith	Oakland Raiders	RB
1971	6	9	139	Harold Phillips	Denver Broncos	DB
1971	7	26	182	Gordon Bowdell	Baltimore Colts	WR
1971	8	5	187	Tom Beard	Denver Broncos	C
1971	10	13	247	Gary Nowak	San Diego Chargers	TE
1971	11	10	270	Cliff Hardy	Chicago Bears	DB
1971	12	26	312	Bill Triplett	Baltimore Colts	WR
1971	15	26	390	Mile Hogan	Baltimore Colts	LB
1971	16	21	411	Tom Kutchinski	Detroit Lions	DB
1971	17	5	421	Calvin Fox	Houston Oilers	LB
1972	4	26	104	Eric Allen	Baltimore Colts	WR
1972	12	12	298	Ron Curl	Pittsburgh Steelers	T
1972	13	22	334	Herb Washington	Baltimore Colts	WR
1973	1	20	20	Billy Joe DuPree	Dallas Cowboys	TE
1973	1	26	26	Joe DeLamielleure	Buffalo Bills	G
1973	2	14	40	Brad Van Pelt	New York Giants	LB
1973	4	24	102	Gail Clark	Pittsburgh Steelers	LB
1973	6	5	135	Marvin Roberts	San Diego Chargers	C
1973	7	6	162	Brian McConnell	Buffalo Bills	LB
1973	8	22	204	Dan Werner	Dallas Cowboys	QB
1973	9	11	219	Jim Nicholson	Los Angeles Rams	T
1973	11	3	263	Gary Van Elst	Philadelphia Eagles	DT
1973	17	21	437	Robert McClowry	Cleveland Browns	C
1974	2	24	50	Bill Simpson	Los Angeles Rams	DB
1974	7	20	176	Raymond Nester	Dallas Cowboys	LB
1974	8	23	205	Mike Holt	Dallas Cowboys	DB
1975	10	1	235	Terry McClowry	New York Giants	LB
1975	13	24	336	Mike Hurd	Minnesota Vikings	WR
1976	7	4	186	Greg Schaum	Dallas Cowboys	DT
1976	13	22	369	Greg Brewton	St. Louis Cardinals	DT
1977	1	22	22	Mike Cobb	Cincinnati Bengals	TE
1977	3	27	83	Tom Hannon	Minnesota Vikings	DB
1978	1	28	28	Larry Bethea	Dallas Cowboys	DE
1978	6	11	149	Al Pitts	Cleveland Browns	C
1978	7	4	170	James Earley	New York Jets	RB
1979	3	7	63	Mel Land	Miami Dolphins	LB
1979	7	8	173	Kirk Gibson	St. Louis Cardinals	WR
1979	8	28	220	Tom Graves	Pittsburgh Steelers	LB
1979	10	10	258	Jerome Stanton	Miami Dolphins	DB
1979	11	18	293	Jim Hinesly	Seattle Seahawks	G
1980	2	10	38	Angelo Fields	Houston Oilers	T
1980	3	11	67	Mark Brammer	Buffalo Bills	TE
1980	6	20	158	Eugene Byrd	Miami Dolphins	WR
1980	8	23	216	Larry Savage	Dallas Cowboys	LB
1980	10	13	262	Tanya Webb	New Orleans Saints	DE
1981	3	6	62	Ray Stachowicz	Green Bay Packers	P
1982	3	2	57	Jim Burroughs	Baltimore Colts	DB
1982	4	3	86	Morten Andersen	New Orleans Saints	K
1982	7	18	185	Tom Morris	Tampa Bay Buccaneers	DB
1982	7	19	186	Jeff Wiska	New York Giants	G
1982	9	28	251	Bryan Clark	San Francisco 49ers	QB
1983	4	25	109	Steve Maidlow	Cincinnati Bengals	LB
1983	5	6	118	Smiley Creswell	New England Patriots	DE
1983	5	22	134	Otis Grant	Los Angeles Rams	WR
1983	11	26	305	Howard McAdoo	Cleveland Browns	LB
1984	1	3	3	Carl Banks	New York Giants	LB
1984	2	21	49	Daryl Turner	Seattle Seahawks	WR
1984	9	5	229	Scott Auer	Kansas City Chiefs	T
1985	4	12	96	Ralf Mojsiejenko	San Diego Chargers	K
1985	5	11	123	Mark Napolitan	Seattle Seahawks	C
1985	6	10	150	Terry Lewis	San Diego Chargers	DB
1985	11	22	302	Jim Morrissey	Chicago Bears	LB
1985	12	17	325	Lonnie Young	St. Louis Cardinals	DB
1986	1	5	5	Anthony Bell	St. Louis Cardinals	LB
1986	7	14	180	Butch Rolle	Buffalo Bills	TE
1986	11	11	288	Steve Bogdalek	Philadelphia Eagles	G
1987	1	28	28	Mark Ingram Sr.	New York Giants	WR
1987	12	9	316	Bobby Morse	Philadelphia Eagles	RB
1988	1	22	22	Lorenzo White	Houston Oilers	RB
1988	3	17	72	Greg Montgomery	Houston Oilers	P
1988	6	8	145	David Houle	New York Giants	G
1988	8	13	206	Tim Moore	Phoenix Cardinals	LB
1988	8	16	209	Mark Nichols	Pittsburgh Steelers	DT
1989	1	2	2	Tony Mandarich	Green Bay Packers	T
1989	1	22	22	Andre Rison	Indianapolis Colts	WR
1989	3	19	75	Kevin Robbins	Los Angeles Rams	T
1989	8	17	212	Kurt Larson	Indianapolis Colts	LB
1990	1	13	13	Percy Snow	Kansas City Chiefs	LB
1990	4	4	85	Travis Davis	Phoenix Cardinals	DT
1990	4	20	101	Harlon Barnett	Cleveland Browns	DB
1990	7	10	175	Bob Kula	Seattle Seahawks	T
1990	10	11	259	James Szymanski	Denver Broncos	DE
1990	11	8	284	Brent White	Chicago Bears	DE
1990	12	5	309	Ventson Donelson	New England Patriots	DB
1991	1	17	17	Bobby Wilson	Washington Redskins	DT
1991	2	10	37	Dixon Edwards	Dallas Cowboys	LB
1991	2	20	47	Eric Moten	San Diego Chargers	G
1991	3	10	65	Carlos Jenkins	Minnesota Vikings	LB
1991	5	12	123	Duane Young	San Diego Chargers	TE
1991	7	14	181	James Bradley	Indianapolis Colts	WR
1991	10	15	265	Hyland Hickson	Tampa Bay Buccaneers	RB
1991	12	26	332	Cliff Confer	San Francisco 49ers	DE
1992	2	16	44	Courtney Hawkins	Tampa Bay Buccaneers	WR
1992	3	9	65	Bill Johnson	Cleveland Browns	DT
1992	5	11	123	Alan Haller	Pittsburgh Steelers	DB
1992	7	13	181	Jim Johnson	Denver Broncos	T
1992	8	18	214	Chuck Bullough	Philadelphia Eagles	LB
1992	12	12	320	John MacNeill	Seattle Seahawks	DE
1993	6	11	151	Mitch Lyons	Atlanta Falcons	TE
1993	7	6	174	Ty Hallock	Detroit Lions	LB
1994	1	22	22	Rob Fredrickson	Los Angeles Raiders	LB
1994	5	9	140	Myron Bell	Pittsburgh Steelers	DB
1994	6	17	178	Jim Miller	Pittsburgh Steelers	QB
1994	7	15	209	Brice Abrams	Pittsburgh Steelers	RB
1995	2	8	40	Brian DeMarco	Jacksonville Jaguars	DT
1995	2	31	63	Shane Hannah	Dallas Cowboys	G
1996	2	12	42	Tony Banks	St. Louis Rams	QB
1996	2	13	43	Muhsin Muhammad	Carolina Panthers	WR
1996	6	26	193	Scott Greene	Carolina Panthers	RB
1997	4	2	98	Derrick Mason	Tennessee Oilers	WR
1997	6	34	197	Nigea Carter	Tampa Bay Buccaneers	WR
1998	2	8	38	Flozell Adams	Dallas Cowboys	T
1998	5	19	142	Ike Reese	Philadelphia Eagles	LB
1998	5	20	143	Scott Shaw	Miami Dolphins	G
1999	1	29	29	Dimitrius Underwood	Minnesota Vikings	DE
1999	4	8	103	Sedrick Irvin	Detroit Lions	RB
2000	1	8	8	Plaxico Burress	Pittsburgh Steelers	WR
2000	1	16	16	Julian Peterson	San Francisco 49ers	LB
2000	4	5	99	Gari Scott	Philadelphia Eagles	WR
2000	4	33	127	Greg Randall	New England Patriots	T
2000	5	6	135	Aric Morris	Tennessee Titans	DB
2000	6	8	174	Paul Edinger	Chicago Bears	K
2000	6	31	197	Robaire Smith	Tennessee Titans	DE
2001	7	2	202	Renaldo Hill	Arizona Cardinals	DB
2001	7	17	217	Tupe Peko	New York Jets	T
2001	7	39	239	T. J. Turner	New England Patriots	LB
2002	1	18	18	T. J. Duckett	Atlanta Falcons	RB
2002	3	23	88	Chris Baker	New York Jets	TE
2002	5	9	144	Herb Haygood	Denver Broncos	WR
2002	5	37	172	Josh Shaw	San Francisco 49ers	DT
2002	6	22	194	Craig Jarrett	Seattle Seahawks	P
2003	1	2	2	Charles Rogers	Detroit Lions	WR
2004	4	18	114	Matthias Askew	Cincinnati Bengals	DT
2004	6	36	201	Jeff Smoker	St. Louis Rams	QB
2005	6	27	201	DeAndra' Cobb	Atlanta Falcons	RB
2005	6	28	202	Dave Rayner	Indianapolis Colts	K
2005	7	2	216	Kevin Vickerson	Miami Dolphins	DT
2005	7	32	246	Will Whitticker	Green Bay Packers	G
2006	3	33	97	Eric Smith	New York Jets	DB
2006	4	26	123	Domata Peko	Cincinnati Bengals	DT
2006	7	6	214	Chris Morris	Oakland Raiders	C
2007	2	11	43	Drew Stanton	Detroit Lions	QB
2007	5	17	154	Clifton Ryan	St. Louis Rams	DT
2007	7	15	225	Brandon Fields	Miami Dolphins	P
2008	2	3	34	Devin Thomas	Washington Redskins	WR
2008	5	23	158	Kellen Davis	Chicago Bears	TE
2008	7	1	208	Ervin Baldwin	Chicago Bears	DE
2009	5	37	173	Javon Ringer	Tennessee Titans	RB
2010	7	8	215	Jeremy Ware	Oakland Raiders	DB
2011	6	20	185	Greg Jones	New York Giants	LB
2011	6	23	188	Chris Rucker	Indianapolis Colts	DB
2012	2	19	51	Jerel Worthy	Green Bay Packers	DT
2012	4	7	102	Kirk Cousins	Washington Redskins	QB
2012	4	26	121	Keshawn Martin	Houston Texans	WR
2012	6	10	180	Trenton Robinson	San Francisco 49ers	DB
2012	6	13	183	B. J. Cunningham	Miami Dolphins	WR
2012	7	43	250	Edwin Baker	San Diego Chargers	RB
2013	2	16	48	Le'Veon Bell	Pittsburgh Steelers	RB
2013	4	9	106	Dion Sims	Miami Dolphins	TE
2013	4	29	126	William Gholston	Tampa Bay Buccaneers	DE
2014	1	24	24	Darqueze Dennard	Cincinnati Bengals	DB
2015	1	11	11	Trae Waynes	Minnesota Vikings	DB
2015	4	7	106	Jeremy Langford	Chicago Bears	RB
2015	5	20	156	Tony Lippett	Miami Dolphins	WR
2015	5	39	175	Keith Mumphery	Houston Texans	WR
2016	1	8	8	Jack Conklin	Tennessee Titans	T
2016	3	12	75	Shilique Calhoun	Oakland Raiders	DE
2016	4	2	100	Connor Cook	Oakland Raiders	QB
2016	6	38	213	Aaron Burbridge	San Francisco 49ers	WR
2016	7	3	224	Donavon Clark	San Diego Chargers	G
2017	2	3	35	Malik McDowell	Seattle Seahawks	DT
2017	4	16	123	Montae Nicholson	Washington Redskins	DB
2018	4	11	111	Brian Allen	Los Angeles Rams	C
2019	3	19	83	Justin Layne	Pittsburgh Steelers	DB
2019	4	7	109	Khari Willis	Indianapolis Colts	DB
2020	4	31	137	Josiah Scott	Jacksonville Jaguars	DB
2020	7	11	225	Kenny Willekes	Minnesota Vikings	DE
2022	2	9	41	Kenneth Walker III	Seattle Seahawks	RB
2022	6	11	191	Jalen Nailor	Minnesota Vikings	WR
2022	6	29	208	Connor Heyward	Pittsburgh Steelers	FB
2022	7	40	261	A. J. Arcuri	Los Angeles Rams	T
2023	2	19	50	Jayden Reed	Green Bay Packers	WR
2023	6	15	192	Bryce Baringer	New England Patriots	P
2023	6	37	214	Ameer Speed	New England Patriots	DB
2024	7	8	228	Nick Samac	Baltimore Ravens	C
2025	6	19	195	Luke Newman	Chicago Bears	G
2026	6	28	209	Matt Gulbin	Washington Commanders	C
2026	6	30	211	Ryan Eckley	Baltimore Ravens	P

== Notable undrafted players ==
Note: No drafts held before 1920

Debut Year	Player	Position	Debut Team	Notes
1960	Tony Discenzo	T	Buffalo Bills	—
1960	Roger Donnahoo	DB	New York Titans	—
1960	Paul Rochester	DT	Dallas Texans	—
1961	Dan Ane	FB	Pittsburgh Steelers	—
1961	Fred Boylen	LB	New York Titans	—
1962	Bob Suci	DB	Houston Oilers	—
1964	Pete Gent	WR	Dallas Cowboys	—
1964	Dave Manders	C	Dallas Cowboys	—
1964	Dan Underwood	LB	Kansas City Chiefs	—
1965	Tom Krzemienski	TE	New York Jets	—
1966	Ron Goovert	LB	Houston Oilers	—
1966	Don Weatherspoon	DE	Detroit Lions	—
1972	Henry Matthews	RB	New England Patriots	—
1975	Charlie Ane	C	Kansas City Chiefs	—
1978	Tom Birney	K	New England Patriots	—
1978	Hans Nielsen	K	Atlanta Falcons	—
1978	Paul Rudzinski	LB	Green Bay Packers	—
1986	Veno Belk	TE	Seattle Seahawks	—
1986	John Wojciechowski	T	Buffalo Bills	—
1987	Dave Yarema	QB	Green Bay Packers	—
1988	Pat Shurmur	G	Green Bay Packers	—
1989	Willie Bouyer	WR	Seattle Seahawks	—
1990	Matt Vanderbeek	LB	Indianapolis Colts	—
1991	Mike Iaquaniello	DB	Miami Dolphins	—
1992	Ed O'Bradovich	LB	Chicago Bears	—
1995	Colin Cronin	G	New York Jets	—
1997	Jabbar Threats	DE	Jacksonville Jaguars	—
1998	Travis Reece	FB	Detroit Lions	—
1999	Josh Keur	TE	Indianapolis Colts	—
1999	Lemar Marshall	LB	Tampa Bay Buccaneers	—
1999	Robert Newkirk	DT	Dallas Cowboys	—
2002	Little John Flowers	RB	New York Jets	—
2002	Josh Thornhill	LB	Detroit Lions	—
2002	Ryan Van Dyke	QB	Seattle Seahawks	—
2004	Mike Labinjo	LB	Philadelphia Eagles	—
2006	Brandon McKinney	DT	San Diego Chargers	—
2007	Kerry Reed	WR	Miami Dolphins	—
2008	Kyle Cook	C	Cincinnati Bengals	—
2009	Brian Hoyer	QB	New England Patriots	—
2009	Ogemdi Nwagbuo	DT	San Diego Chargers	—
2010	Jehuu Caulcrick	FB	Buffalo Bills	—
2010	Brett Swenson	K	Indianapolis Colts	—
2010	Blair White	WR	Indianapolis Colts	—
2012	Garrett Celek	TE	San Francisco 49ers	—
2014	Max Bullough	LB	Houston Texans	—
2014	Tyler Hoover	DE	Indianapolis Colts	—
2015	Kurtis Drummond	S	Houston Texans	—
2015	Bennie Fowler	WR	Denver Broncos	—
2015	Marcus Rush	LB	San Francisco 49ers	—
2016	Jack Allen	C	New Orleans Saints	—
2016	Taybor Pepper	LS	Green Bay Packers	—
2017	Demetrious Cox	S	Cincinnati Bengals	—
2019	Andrew Dowell	LB	Dallas Cowboys	—
2019	Matt Sokol	TE	Los Angeles Chargers	—
2020	Joe Bachie	LB	Philadelphia Eagles	—
2020	Brian Lewerke	QB	New England Patriots	—
2020	Mike Panasiuk	DT	Las Vegas Raiders	—
2020	Darrell Stewart Jr.	WR	Green Bay Packers	—
2020	Cody White	WR	Kansas City Chiefs	—
2020	Raequan Williams	DT	Philadelphia Eagles	—
2021	Shakur Brown	DB	Pittsburgh Steelers	—
2021	Naquan Jones	DT	Tennessee Titans	—
2023	Kendell Brooks	S	Arizona Cardinals	—
2023	Ben VanSumeren	FB	Philadelphia Eagles	—
2024	Dashaun Mallory	DT	Chicago Bears	—
2024	Tre Mosley	WR	Cincinnati Bengals	—
2025	Montorie Foster	WR	Seattle Seahawks	—
2025	Cade McDonald	WR	Cleveland Browns	—
2026	Omari Kelly	WR	Chicago Bears	—
2026	Wayne Matthews	LB	Chicago Bears	—
2026	Elijah Tau-Tolliver	RB	Baltimore Ravens	—
2026	Jack Velling	TE	Atlanta Falcons	—
