= Rita Duffy =

Artist from Northern Ireland

- Born: 1959 (age 66–67); Belfast
- Style: Surrealism and magic realism
- Movement: Republicanism, pacifism and feminism
- Website: http://www.artnet.com/artists/rita-duffy/

Rita Duffy (born 1959) is a Northern Ireland artist, described in 2005 as the province's "foremost artist". She describes herself as a Republican, pacifist and feminist.

Her installations and projects often highlight socio-political issues and some of her work is in the permanent collections of the Irish Museum of Modern Art and the Imperial War Museum in London.

== Background ==
Rita Duffy was born in Belfast in 1959 to a Catholic family and grew up during the Troubles of the 1970s, in the Protestant neighbourhood of Stranmillis, Belfast. Duffy received her MA in Fine Art at the University of Ulster. She was awarded the Gold Medal, Royal Ulster Academy of Arts in 2006. When at college she preferred socially engaged, figurative painting and, during her holidays, she lived in New York City drawing street portraits.

== Work ==
Duffy describes herself as a Republican, a nationalist, a pacifist and a feminist. She uses irony, wit and humour to interrogate Irish history and politics. Her work is also influenced by surrealism and magic realism.

In 2005, Duffy came to wider attention for her proposal to tow an iceberg from Greenland to Belfast, representing the city's links to the RMS Titanic and also highlighting the frosty impasse of Northern Irish politics. During Derry's year as UK City of Culture, Duffy ran the "Shirt Factory Project", employing four people. The project was part gallery, part museum and part shop. On 24 April 2016, the centenary of the Easter Rising to end British rule in Ireland, Duffy opened a show called "The Souvenir Shop" in a Georgian mansion in North Great George's Street, Dublin. The exhibition sought to examine Irish identity.

Duffy's work can be found in several major public collections, including: the Irish Museum of Modern Art; Arts Council of Northern Ireland; Ulster Museum, Belfast; Museum of Contemporary Art, Zagreb; The Drawing Museum, New York; the Office of Public Works, Dublin; and the Imperial War Museum in London.

She works from her studio based in Ballyconnell, County Cavan, in the Irish Republic just south of the border with Northern Ireland.
