= Hugo MacNeill =

Hugo MacNeill may refer to:

- Hugo MacNeill (Irish Army officer) (1900–1963)
- Hugo MacNeill (rugby union) (born 1958), former Ireland international rugby union player
