= Torquil MacNeill =

Scottish 16th century clan chief

Torquil MacNeill (Scottish Gaelic: Torcall MacNèill) was a mid sixteenth century clan chief.

In the sixteenth century, there was a clan of MacNeills centred on the Inner Hebridean island of Gigha. In about 1530, the chief of the clan, Niall MacNeill of Gigha, died without a male heir. While Niall's lands passed to his daughter, the chiefship of the clan passed over to her second cousin, Torquil MacNeill. In 1531, Torquil is recorded as the "chief and principale of the clan and surname of Maknelis". In 1542, a Crown grant of the clan lands was given to Niall, the illegitimate son of the deceased Niall MacNeill of Gigha. As late as 1553, Torquil was still regarded to be chief, for he is recorded as "principalis seu primarius tribus sive familie de MacNeille". In that year he is also described as being in very poor health. According to historian John Bannerman, it is likely that on Torquil's death, the chiefship of the clan officially passed over to Niall MacNeill of Gigha, who possessed the clan's lands.

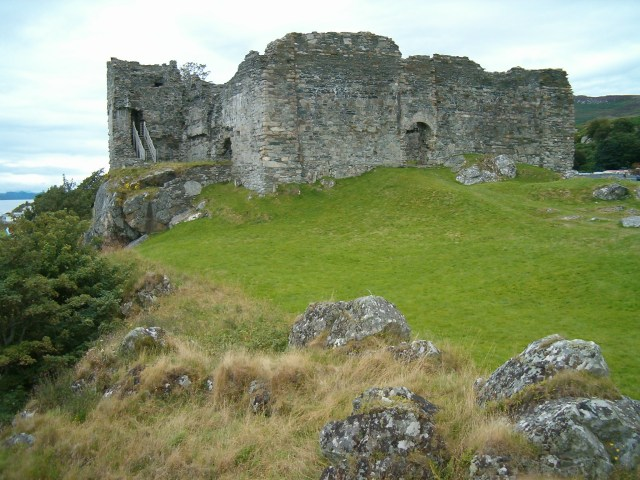
Ruinous Castle Sween, in 2006

The nineteenth-century Scottish scholar William Forbes Skene believed that Torquil was not a member of either the clan on Gigha, or the clan on Barra (although Skene believed that the clans shared a common ancestry). Skene observed that in about 1530, both clans are known to have had chiefs of their own, and concluded that Torquil must have been chief of another (although a more senior chief). Skene also noted that Torquil was not designated with any property, and supposed that the chiefs of his clan were the hereditary keepers of Castle Sween. Earlier in 1472, a Hector Mactorquill Macneill is recorded as the keeper of the castle, and Skene considered this man to be the first record of a chief of Torquil's clan.

Skene also noted that Torquil seems to have been the last of his line, and suggested that an heiress of his clan passed the hereditary possessions to the MacMillans, who are recorded in possession of the castle and certain surrounding lands. After the demise of Torquil, the most prominent chiefs of both the Gigha, and Barra clans, were those of Barra.

The Lament of Effric, being the lament of Effric McCorquadale for her husband, Hector Torquil MacNeill, 1st of Taynish, Constable of Castle Sween. From the Dean of Lismore's Book.

Jewel, who has roused my grief,
Beloved hast thou been of me,
Beloved that joyous, generous heart,
Which thou hadst until this night.

Thy death has filled me with grief,
The hand round which I lived so long,
That I hear not of its strength,
And that I saw it not depart;
That joyful mouth of softest sounds,
Well was it known in every land.

Lion of Mull, with its white towers,
Hawk of Isla, with its smooth plains,
Shrewdest of all the men we knew,
Whom guest ne'er left without a gift.

Prince of good men, gentle, kind,
Whose mien was that of a king's son,
Guests came to thee from Dunanoir,
Guests from the Boyne for lordly gifts.
Truth it is they often came,
Not oftener than gave thee joy.

Shapely falcon of Sliabh Gael,
Protection to the bards thou gav'st,
Dragon of Lewis of sandy slopes,
Glad as the whisper of a stream;
The loss of but a single man
Has left me lonely, now he's gone.

No sport, no pleasing song,
No joy, nor pleasure in the feast;
No man whom I can now love,
Of Nial's race down from Niel og;
Among our women there's no joy,
Our men no pleasure have in sport,
Just like the winds when it is calm,
So without music is Dun Sween.

See the palace of a generous race,
Vengeance is taken on clan Neil,
The cause of many a boastful son,
And will till they lay us in the grave;
And now 'tis hard to bear, alas!
That we should lose on every side.

Didst thou, son of Adam, crush
Any cluster of three nuts,
It is to him thou lovest most
The largest third of them thou'dst give.
Thus of their husk the topmost nut,
Does to clan Neil, ungrudged, belong.

The bountiful have often poured
Their gifts on the dwelling of clan Neil.
The prince, who was the last of all,
Is he who me with gloom has filled.
In half my purpose I have failed,
Jewel, who has roused my grief.

Broken my heart is in my breast,
And so 't will be until I die;
Left by that black and noble eyelid,
Jewel, who has roused my grief.

Mary, mother, foster-mother of the king,
Protect thou me from every shaft;
And thou, her Son, who all things mad'st.
Jewel who hast roused my grief.

Dunanoir - A castle on the island of Cape Clear, on the SW coast of Ireland.
Boyne - The river Boyne. From Dunanoir to the Boyne included all Ireland.
Sliabh Ghaidheael - A range of hills in Kintyre
