= Alexander Fletcher (colonial politician) =

Canadian politician

Speaker of the Legislative Assembly of Prince Edward Island
- In office 1785, 1790 – 1787
- Preceded by: Walter Berry

Personal details
- Citizenship: Canadian
- Profession: Politician

Alexander Fletcher was the speaker of Legislative Assembly of Prince Edward Island from 1785 to 1787. He was re-elected speaker in the year 1790.
