= William McNeill (politician) =

Canadian politician

Speaker of the Legislative Assembly of Prince Edward Island
- In office 1831–1834
- Preceded by: John Stewart
- Succeeded by: George R. Dalrymple

Personal details
- Citizenship: Canadian
- Profession: Politician

William McNeill was the speaker of 13th Legislative Assembly of Prince Edward Island from 1831 to 1834. He was the speaker during all the four sessions of the assembly.
