= Murder of Michele MacNeill =

2007 American murder

- Date: April 11, 2007
- Location: Pleasant Grove, Utah, United States
- Cause: Drug combination leading to sedation and heart arrhythmia resulting in cardiac death
- Convicted: Martin MacNeill
- Verdict: Guilty
- Convictions: First-degree murder, 15 years to life; Obstruction of justice, one to 15 years; Sexual abuse, against the MacNeills' daughter, Alexis, one to 15 years with murder and obstruction sentences consecutive to this sentence for a minimum total of 17 years; Other conviction: Identity theft, against the MacNeills' adopted daughter, Giselle, four years, released before above convictions

Michele Marie MacNeill, (née Somers; January 15, 1957 – April 11, 2007) was an American homemaker and model. Michele was married for nearly 30 years to the physician Martin MacNeill and was the mother of eight children. She died in Pleasant Grove, Utah, on April 11, 2007, while at home recovering from cosmetic surgery performed eight days earlier. At her husband's request, the operating surgeon prescribed four medicines for her recovery; two of the drugs, Diazepam and Oxycodone, would not normally be prescribed to his patients.

Michele had been concerned during her recovery that Martin was having an affair and that she had been given medication by him inappropriately. Her daughter Alexis, a medical student at that time, then took responsibility for giving Michele her medicine. Michele recovered sufficiently for Alexis to return to school but Michele died the following day. Initially, police and autopsy reports concluded that Michele died of cardiovascular disease, but after being pressed to review the toxicology report, the state's chief medical examiner found that the combination of medicines in her body could have contributed to cardiac death.

During the trial, which began on October 17, 2013, Chief Prosecutor Chad Grunander stated, "It was an almost perfect murder, [MacNeill] pumped her full of drugs that he knew would be difficult to detect once she was dead." Martin MacNeill was convicted of Michele's murder and obstruction of justice in a widely publicized case involving marital infidelity, sexual abuse, and outward religious devotion.

Martin MacNeill was sentenced to 17 years to life. He committed suicide in prison in April 2017.

== Personal life ==
Michele Marie Somers was born in 1957, the daughter of Milton and Helen Somers. Michele grew up in Concord, California, where she played violin, acted, and was a cheerleader and homecoming queen. She was a straight-A student, and an active member of the Church of Jesus Christ of Latter-day Saints (LDS Church). Michele was an exchange student in Switzerland, a model, and Miss Concord in 1976.

Michele met Martin MacNeill (February 1, 1956 – April 9, 2017) at an activity for LDS young adults. Martin had joined the military in 1973 at the age of 17. He was placed on disability leave for mental health reasons in 1975, and received veterans' benefits for years. Michele eloped with Martin, and the couple was married on February 21, 1978. Four months after the marriage, Martin served a six-month jail sentence for forgery, theft, and fraud.

In 2007, the MacNeill family lived in a gated community in Pleasant Grove, Utah, and were active in their LDS congregation. Michele was the mother of eight children: Rachel, Vanessa, Alexis, Damian, Giselle, Elle, Sabrina, and Ada—the latter four of whom were supposedly adopted from Ukraine. However, although Ada MacNeill was adopted by Michele and Martin, Ada is actually the daughter of Vanessa MacNeill, and Michele and Martin's biological granddaughter.

Martin MacNeill was the medical director of Utah State Development Center in American Fork, Utah. Martin had served as an LDS bishop (lay leader of a congregation). He was formerly a physician practicing in Pleasant Grove, had served in the military, and had received a law degree, though he did not practice law. Investigators later determined that Martin had falsified university transcripts to enter the California medical school where he earned his degree in osteopathic medicine, and also falsified his later application to J. Reuben Clark Law School.

He was reputedly dissatisfied with his marriage, made statements about wanting a divorce, and had extramarital affairs—including a relationship with Gypsy Willis—before and after the death of his wife. Martin and Michele had been married for 29 years, 2 months, and 10 days at the time of her death.

On January 16, 2010, MacNeill's 24-year-old son, Damian Alexander MacNeill, committed suicide. He was a law student at New York Law School at the time. Prior to Damian's death, the Utah County Attorney's Office sent a letter to New York Law School stating that "investigators in the Utah County Attorney's Office deemed him [Damian] to be a very dangerous individual who possessed homicidal impulses and discussed the 'joys of killing,'" and that "Damian was present in Pleasant Grove on the date of his mother's death."

== Events leading up to the murder ==
=== Troubled marriage ===
According to Rachel MacNeill, Michele MacNeill heard Martin threaten to commit suicide many times. In 1994, Martin was accused of having sexual relations with a patient at the BYU Health Center and threatened suicide. According to police reports, Martin MacNeill threatened to kill himself and Michele with a butcher knife in August 2000, after Michele caught him looking at pornography. In 2005, Martin threatened to commit suicide once more when Michele caught him looking at pornography again. In February 2007, Michele confronted Martin repeatedly about her suspicions that he was having an affair. Martin had at least two affairs in the 2005–2007 time frame: one with Anna Osborne Walthall, and another with Gypsy Willis.

=== Cosmetic surgery ===
In March 2007, Martin MacNeill presented the idea to Michele of having cosmetic surgery. Michele was reluctant to have the surgery performed in the short term, preferring to postpone the operation for health reasons. She wanted to ensure that her high blood pressure was well under control, and preferred to lose some weight before the surgery. Martin pressed for the surgery, and Michele reportedly agreed to the facelift because she thought it would help her marriage. At Michele's last consultation before surgery, Martin, who was a physician at the time, reportedly gave the plastic surgeon a list of drugs he wanted prescribed to Michele. The surgeon prescribed Lortab, Ambien, Valium, Percocet (Oxycodone), Phenergan, and Keflex. Dr. Scott Thompson, who performed the surgery, admitted that he did not normally prescribe Diazepam (Valium) and Oxycodone for his patients. The medication dosages were stronger than what the surgeon would normally prescribe.

The surgery was conducted on April 3, 2007. Michele spent the night in the hospital, and was released on April 4. The following morning, Michele was found to be "unresponsive" by her oldest daughter, Alexis, who was on break from medical school. Her father, Martin, told her that he "probably over-medicated" his wife. Although Michele survived, Alexis then took care of dispensing medicine to her mother during the rest of her stay at her parents' home. According to Alexis, Michele was fearful of Martin's efforts to give her medicine she did not need. On April 6, 2007, Michele told Alexis that “if anything happens to me, make sure it was not your dad.”

=== Mistress ===
On April 6, Michele confronted Martin about numerous calls and text messages to Gypsy Willis.

During the trial, prosecutors contended that MacNeill killed his wife so he could be with his mistress, Gypsy Willis (aka Gypsy Jyll Willis, aka Jillian Giselle MacNeill). MacNeill hired Willis as a nanny for his youngest children two weeks after murdering Michele and they were both convicted of identity theft, using the identity of MacNeill's adopted daughter for Willis's benefit. The daughter had been sent back to Ukraine.

=== Health condition ===
During the weeks leading up to the murder, MacNeill gave the impression that he had contracted a medical condition that required him to walk with a cane. His medical records showed that he had been in good health. Martin MacNeill also "had been collecting veteran benefits for decades, saying in an application he had bipolar or anti-social disorders".

=== Death and autopsy ===
Alexis returned to medical school on April 10, 2007, believing that her mother's recovery was well under way. The following day, April 11, 2007, Michele MacNeill and Alexis talked at 8:44 a.m. MST and Michele said that she was doing well. At 9:10 a.m., Martin called Alexis asking her to call her mother, saying he was concerned that she wasn't doing well and wasn't getting out of bed.

Michele died at the age of 50 in the bathtub of her home in Pleasant Grove. Although Martin said that he was at work in the morning, he was not seen in public until 11:00 a.m, when he arrived at a local Safety Fair. After picking up his youngest daughter Ada from school at about 11:35 a.m., they arrived back at the home between 11:35 and 11:46 a.m., and Ada found her mother unresponsive, head down in the master bathroom bathtub. Martin ordered his son, Damian MacNeill, or Damian's girlfriend, to get rid of all of Michele's medication, ostensibly to keep the plastic surgery a private matter.

Michele was declared dead later that day. An autopsy was performed, and her cause of death was determined to be cardiovascular disease. Police and autopsy reports concluded that Michele's death was accidental and of natural causes.

The children of Michele and Martin MacNeill questioned their mother's cause of death, and pressed for a review of the toxicology report. In addition, in September 2007, Linda Cluff, Michele's sister, wrote a letter to the then governor of Utah, Jon Huntsman, and the Utah County Attorney's Office asking them to investigate Michele's death. Dr. Todd Grey, the State of Utah's chief medical examiner, performed the review, and found that none of the medicines found in her body were at toxic levels, but that the combination of Promethazine (Phenergan), Zolpidem (Ambien), Diazepam (Valium) and Oxycodone (Percocet) "could have led to sedation and heart arrhythmia, resulting in cardiac death". Because of Grey's report, her manner of death was changed on October 6, 2010, to "undetermined" and the cause to "combined effects of heart disease and drug toxicity". It was noted that Michele would not have been able to administer the medication to herself.

== Memorial service ==
Michele's memorial service was held on April 14, 2007, at the church located adjacent to the Mt. Timpanogos Temple. Martin spoke at the service and rather than focus on Michele he talked about how life had been unfair to him.

== Identity theft ==
In 2009, Martin was sentenced to four years in prison for federal identity theft charges. He had used the identifying information from his adopted daughter Giselle to obtain false legal documents for his girlfriend Gypsy Willis in Giselle's name. His stated motive was tax evasion, as Willis owed substantial sums to the Internal Revenue Service and Martin wished to avoid any possible liability for these debts. He was released from prison on the identity theft charges in July 2012, whereupon Utah county officials announced that Martin was a suspect in the murder of his wife.

In 2011, Willis was sentenced to three years' probation for her part in the identity theft scheme, with credit for 180 days in jail awaiting trial.

== Murder charges and trial ==
On August 24, 2012, the Utah County Attorney's Office charged Martin with murdering Michele. Martin's trial began on October 17, 2013. Martin MacNeill pleaded not guilty, claiming his wife died due to accidental death. Medical examiners did not rule that her death was the result of murder, but prosecutors convinced the jury that Martin MacNeill was responsible for killing his wife by drowning and prescription drugs. The arrest warrant stated that earlier in his life, MacNeill had attempted to murder his mother and had killed his brother, Rufus Roy MacNeill, who had been found dead in a bathtub. MacNeill had not been tried for his brother's death.

After the prosecution filed a motion to ban camera coverage of the trial, the Utah 4th District Court, upholding a state rule which went into effect on April 1, ruled that the trial could be broadcast and live-streamed—the first in Utah history. Coverage would exclude video of testimony by federal inmates who feared retaliation.

The 22-day trial was litigated by Chief Prosecutor Chad Grunander, and Martin MacNeill's defense team included Randall Spencer and Susanne Gustin. In his closing statement to the jury, Grunander stated, "It was an almost perfect murder, [MacNeill] pumped her full of drugs that he knew would be difficult to detect once she was dead." During the trial, a previous mistress of Martin MacNeill testified that MacNeill had stated that there was a way to kill a person that would appear to be a natural heart attack. Fellow inmates claimed that MacNeill had claimed he killed his wife, but it could not be proven.

The defense claimed that Michele MacNeill had overdosed on her prescribed medication and fallen into the bathtub and drowned. The jury deliberated for 11 hours and on November 9, 2013, found MacNeill guilty of the first degree murder of his wife, Michele, on April 11, 2007. He was also convicted by the Provo, Utah, jury of obstruction of justice for hindering the investigation of his wife's murder by attempting to make Michele's death appear accidental. The murder conviction carries a term of fifteen years to life, with an additional one to 15 years for obstruction.

On December 6, 2013, it was reported that he had attempted suicide while in jail. In addition to the murder trial, Martin was found guilty of forcible sexual abuse of his daughter, Alexis Somers, and was sentenced for one to 15 years for that crime. (Note: Martin MacNeill was accused of inappropriately touching his daughter, now named Alexis Somers, on May 23, 2007, five weeks after the death of his wife. In July 2014, an eight-person jury in Provo heard less than one day of testimony from three witnesses in the trial of MacNeill. The jury found MacNeill guilty and he was convicted of forcible sexual abuse, a second-degree felony. On September 15, 2014, Martin MacNeill was sentenced to one to 15 years for his conviction on forcible sexual abuse of his daughter. Because MacNeill refused to admit wrongdoing or to cooperate with investigators, he was ineligible for sex offender treatment and could not have been considered for probation.)

== Sentencing and death in prison ==
On September 19, 2014, MacNeill was sentenced to 15 years to life in prison for his first-degree murder conviction, and one to 15 years in prison for his obstruction of justice conviction. Since Fourth District Judge Derek Pullan ordered that the sentences for murder and obstructing justice were to run consecutively to each other and the sexual abuse sentence, MacNeill would have been required to serve at least 17 years before being eligible for parole: allowing credit for 748 days already served, his earliest parole eligibility date was theoretically September 1, 2029.

In January 2015, the Utah Board of Pardons and Parole ordered that MacNeill would not be eligible for a parole hearing until September 1, 2052, effectively ordering that he would be required to serve at least 40 years; however, since MacNeill would have been 96 years of age at that time if he was still alive, he would have almost certainly spent the rest of his life in prison.

On April 9, 2017, four years and seven months into his sentence, MacNeill was found unresponsive on an outside yard near the prison's greenhouse: a report from the Unified Police Department determined that MacNeill had committed suicide by using a hose and a natural gas line that provided fuel for a greenhouse heater.

== In popular culture ==
The television talk show series Dr. Phil episode "The Doctor, His Wife, His Mistress, the Murder" (season 12, episode 51; air date: November 19, 2013, lay summary) interviewed Gypsy Willis, the mistress of the former doctor convicted for his wife's murder. Willis discusses the affair, the crime along with her own 2009 conviction of fraud.

The South Korean variety program Crime Scene adapted aspects of the Michele MacNeill case for an episode in 2014.

The crime documentary series Corrupt Crimes released the episode of the MacNeill murder, subtitled "Corrupt Crimes: The Makeover Murder" (season 2, episode 48; air date: June 30, 2017). The episode details the former beauty queen's death and the years of her sister and daughter's persistence to re-examine her death. Their commitment finally leads officials to request her cause of death to be re-investigated. The toxicology report reveals lethal levels of painkillers at the time of death, leading to Martin MacNeill's arrest, conviction and sentencing for the murder of his wife of 30 years.

Dateline NBC aired an episode entitled "Secrets in Pleasant Grove" on July 27, 2018. It was episode 60 of season 26.

20/20 aired an episode entitled "The Perfect Nanny" on June 14, 2019.

The Good Father: The Martin MacNeill Story aired on Lifetime on October 2, 2021, dramatizing the case as "based on true story" with Tom Everett Scott in the leading role.
