= James MacNeill =

James MacNeill is the name of:

- James A. MacNeill (1854–1927), former merchant and politician from Prince Edward Island, Canada
- James McNeill (1869–1938), Irish politician and diplomat
- James Walter MacNeill (1873–1945), first superintendent of Saskatchewan Hospital, North Battleford, Saskatchewan
- Jim MacNeill (1928–2016), Canadian consultant, environmentalist, and international public servant

== See also ==
- Jim McNeil (1935–1982), Australian playwright
- Jim McNeill, Polar Explorer
