= John McNeill =

John McNeill may refer to:

== Law and politics ==
- John S. McNeill (1829–1924), Canadian politician in Nova Scotia
- John McNeill (Ontario politician) (1848–1924), Canadian politician
- John McNeill (Australian politician) (1868–1943), Australian politician
- John McNeill (New South Wales politician) (1872–1916), Australian politician
- John McNeill (Alberta politician) (fl. 1910s), Canadian politician
- John McNeill (lawyer) (1899–1982), British lawyer and judge

== Others ==
- Sir John McNeill (diplomat) (1795–1883), Scottish surgeon and diplomat
- John Hanson McNeill (1815–1864), American Confederate army officer
- Sir John McNeill (British Army officer) (1831–1904), Scottish recipient of the Victoria Cross
- John T. McNeill (1885–1975), Canadian theological historian
- John McNeill (footballer) (1910–2002), Maltese footballer
- John J. McNeill (1925–2015), American Roman Catholic priest and theologian
- John McNeill (botanist) (born 1933), British and Canadian botanist and museum director
- J. R. McNeill (John Robert McNeill, born 1954), American environmental historian
- John McNeill (speedway rider) (born 1955), Australian speedway rider
- John McNeill (actor) (born 1956), Australian actor and teacher

== See also ==
- John McNeil (disambiguation)
- John MacNeill (disambiguation)
- Ian Niall (1916–2002), pen name of Scottish writer John McNeillie
