= Donald Burgess McNeill =

Physics and transport author from Northern Ireland

Donald Burgess McNeill FInstP, TD
- Born: 1911
- Died: August 8, 2010 (aged 98–99); Newtownards
- Education: Queen's University Belfast
- Occupation: University lecturer
- Employers: Southampton University; Family business
- Known for: Irish transport history; Physics textbooks; First Esquire Bedell of Southampton University

Donald Burgess McNeill (1911 – 8 August 2010) was a physics and transport history writer, and notable academic. His most recognized academic work is "A Dictionary of Scientific Units - Including dimensionless numbers and scales co-authored with H. G. Jerrard whilst a lecturer at Southampton University. He was also a prolific writer on various modes of transport on the Island of Ireland and served as Chairman of Trustees of the Ulster Folk and Transport Museum. Educated at Queen's University Belfast he helped resurrect their rowing club and was associated with sculling throughout his adult life. A member of the Territorial Army he served in the Royal Corps of Signals in World War II and was active in the Officers' Training Corps of both Queen's and Southampton universities and was awarded the Territorial Decoration (TD) for long service.

== Life ==
=== Early life ===
McNeill's father founded the Belfast-based engineering and construction company McNeill group at the beginning of the 20th century. McNeill was educated at Portora Royal School, Enniskillen, where he claimed he was administered corporal punishment by Samuel Beckett, his dormitory prefect. (Note: It is unclear if the beating was just on a single occasion and whether it was justifiable in the context of the standard practices of the era in the United Kingdom) It was also while at Portora his first transport article was accepted by The Railway Magazine for publication in 1930. As Portora school did not offer physics to advanced level McNeill self-studied to achieve the required level for Queen's University Belfast.

=== Belfast ===
From 1931 to 1938, NcNeill studied physics at Queen's University Belfast, achieving a PhD. Outside of academia he was one of a group who re-founded the Queen's rowing club of which he was later to serve one or more terms as president. He was also participated in Queen's Officers' Training Corps. NcNeill had the honour to be chosen to represent Queens at the 1936 bi-centennial celebrations of Harvard University in America. In 1938 he was appointed as a physics lecturer at University College Southampton, Hampshire, England. (Note: Hartley University college was the predecessor institution to Southampton University) His career was soon interrupted by enlistment to the army in 1939 at the start of World War II and he returned to Northern Ireland.

=== Military ===
McNeill was assigned to the Royal Corps of Signals on enlistment in 1939 and was to ascend to the rank of Major during his service. His first assignment in Northern Ireland as part of the 53rd Welsh Brigade required him to deploy to the west of Dublin should the Germans invade the south. He was also to serve in North Africa where he became chief instructor of signals. He was briefly in Italy before becoming senior technical support to Army broadcasting; being released to resume university lecturing in December 1945, though he remained with the Territorial Army until 1954.

=== Southampton ===
After the war, McNeill resumed as a physics lecturer at Southampton, and was actively involved with the University Officers' Training Corps. In 1953 as the mace-bearing Esquire Bedell he assisted the institution to formally transition from Hartley University College to Southampton University with the chartered authority to award its own degrees. He had the role of Assistant Dean to the Faculty of Science at the university, though he preferred the title Faculty secretary. As an eccentric touch perhaps typical of the period he kept a pink elephant in his room as an introductory icebreaker when communicating with new students. A key work he co-authored with co-worker Dr. Jerrard was A Dictionary of Scientific Units - Including dimensionless numbers and scales which ran to six editions between 1962 and 1993 and was translated into four languages.

=== Retirement ===
McNeill retired from Southampton University in 1971 and returned to Northern Ireland. In 1972, in the midst of The Troubles, he joined the non-sectarian Alliance Party. In 1974, on the death of his brother Sean, NcNeill took over chairmanship of the McNeill Group. He was subsequently invited to the board of trustees of the Ulster Folk and Transport Museum becoming their chairman from 1978 to 1983. As such he was honoured by a portrait painting by Rita Duffy depicting him by favourite locomotive, the JT Class No. 93. His later years saw him continue to be involved with rowing with all the Lagan clubs and tutoring upcoming scullers with his megaphone from the shoreline. His retirement saw him author and co-author a number of transport and historical publications. His final work aged about 97 was a comparative study of Presbyterian Church hymnals. He died two years later on 8 August 2010 aged 99. His collection of transport books and ephemera has been combined with those of his brother-in-law, Frank Green, to constitute the "McNeill-Green Collection" at the Ulster Folk and Transport Museum.

== Personal life ==
NcNeill was generally known as "DB" or "Mac". He never married. He was at one point an elder in the Presbyterian Church but latterly often liked to attend services at the Church of Ireland. On his death he bequeathed his body to Queen's for research.

== Selected bibliography ==
- Jerrard, H. G.; McNeill, D. B. (1993) [1963]. A Dictionary of Scientific Units - Including dimensionless numbers and scales (6 ed.). London: Chapman and Hall. ISBN 0412467208. OCLC 803100353. OL 1351307M.
- McNeill, D. B. (1969). Irish Passenger Steamship Services. Vol. 1: North of Ireland. Newton Abbot, Devon: David & Charles. ISBN 0715343416. OCLC 877238310. OL 6275388W.
- McNeill, D. B. (1971). Irish Passenger Steamship Services. Vol. 2: South of Ireland. Newton Abbot, Devon: David & Charles. ISBN 0715352482. OCLC 60074874.
- McNeill, D. B. (1987). "Rowing at Queen's: 1864-1937". Lady Vic Boat Club. Archived from the original on 1 July 2020.
- McNeill, D. B. (1987). "Rowing at Queen's: 1938-1951". Lady Vic Boat Club. Archived from the original on 1 July 2020.
- Murray, K. A.; McNeill, D. B. (1976). The Great Southern & Western Railway. Irish Record Railway Society. ISBN 0904078051. OCLC 3069424.
