= MacNeal =

MacNeal may refer to:

- Burgess Macneal, American electrical and recording engineer
- Elizabeth Macneal (born 1988), British writer
- Harry L. MacNeal (1875–1950), United States Marine and recipient of the Medal of Honor
- Maggie MacNeal (born 1950), Dutch singer
- Noel MacNeal (born 1961), American puppeteer, writer and television director
- Susan Elia MacNeal (born 1968), American writer
- Catherine MacNeal, American actress who played Lisa Taylor on the show 100 Deeds for Eddie McDowd
- Archibald MacNeal Willard (1836–1918), American painter
- MSC Software, engineering-software company founded as MacNeal–Schwendler Corporation by Richard MacNeal and Robert Schwendler

== See also ==
- Clan MacNeil, Scottish clan
- McNeil (disambiguation)
- McNeill (disambiguation)
- MacNeil
- MacNeill
- McNeal
- MacNeille
