= Howard McNeil =

American meteorologist

Howard Gilbert McNeil (October 24, 1920 – November 27, 2010) was a meteorologist in Dallas/Ft. Worth, Texas, United States, for more than twenty years from the mid-1950s to the mid-1970s. He was affectionately known throughout the Southwest as "The Old Weatherbird" because his broadcasts were seen all over the region as part of the regular programming at the superstation KFJZ, Channel 11.

The Young Weatherbird, 1957
