= MacNeille =

MacNeille or McNeile may refer to:

== MacNeille ==
- Tress MacNeille (born 1951), American voice actress
- Holbrook Mann MacNeille (1907–1973), American mathematician

== McNeile ==
- Ethel McNeile (1875–1922), British missionary and headmistress
- H. C. McNeile (1888–1937), British writer, who published under the pen name "Sapper"
- Hugh M'Neile (1795–1879), Anglican churchman in Ireland

== As middle name ==
- William Macneile Dixon (1866–1946), British author and academic
- John MacNeile Price (1843–1922), British civil engineer and the Surveyor General of Hong Kong

== See also ==
- Clan MacNeil, a Scottish clan
- McNeil (disambiguation)
- McNeill (disambiguation)
- MacNeil
- MacNeill
- McNeal
- MacNeal
