= Charles K. McNeil =

Charles Kline McNeil
- Born: August 16, 1903; Chicago, Illinois, United States
- Died: April 7, 1981 (aged 77); Fort Lauderdale, Florida, United States
- Known for: Creating the points spread in sports betting

Charles Kline McNeil (16 August 1903 – 7 April 1981) was the inventor of the point spread in sports gambling. McNeil earned a Master's Degree from the University of Chicago. He then taught math at the Riverdale Country School in New York and at the Choate School in Connecticut. His students included John F. Kennedy. He was also a securities analyst in Chicago. While gambling on the side, he developed the point spread, betting not on the probability of the final outcome, but on the expected difference in score. He eventually opened his own bookmaking operation in the 1940s.
