= Charles McNeil (physician) =

Charles McNeil FRCPE FRCP RSE (21 September 1881 – 27 April 1964) was a physician specialising in paediatrics, in particular neonatal paediatrics. He was a Fellow of the Royal College of Physicians of London and Edinburgh, and was President of the Royal College of Physicians of Edinburgh from 1940 to 1943.

== Life ==
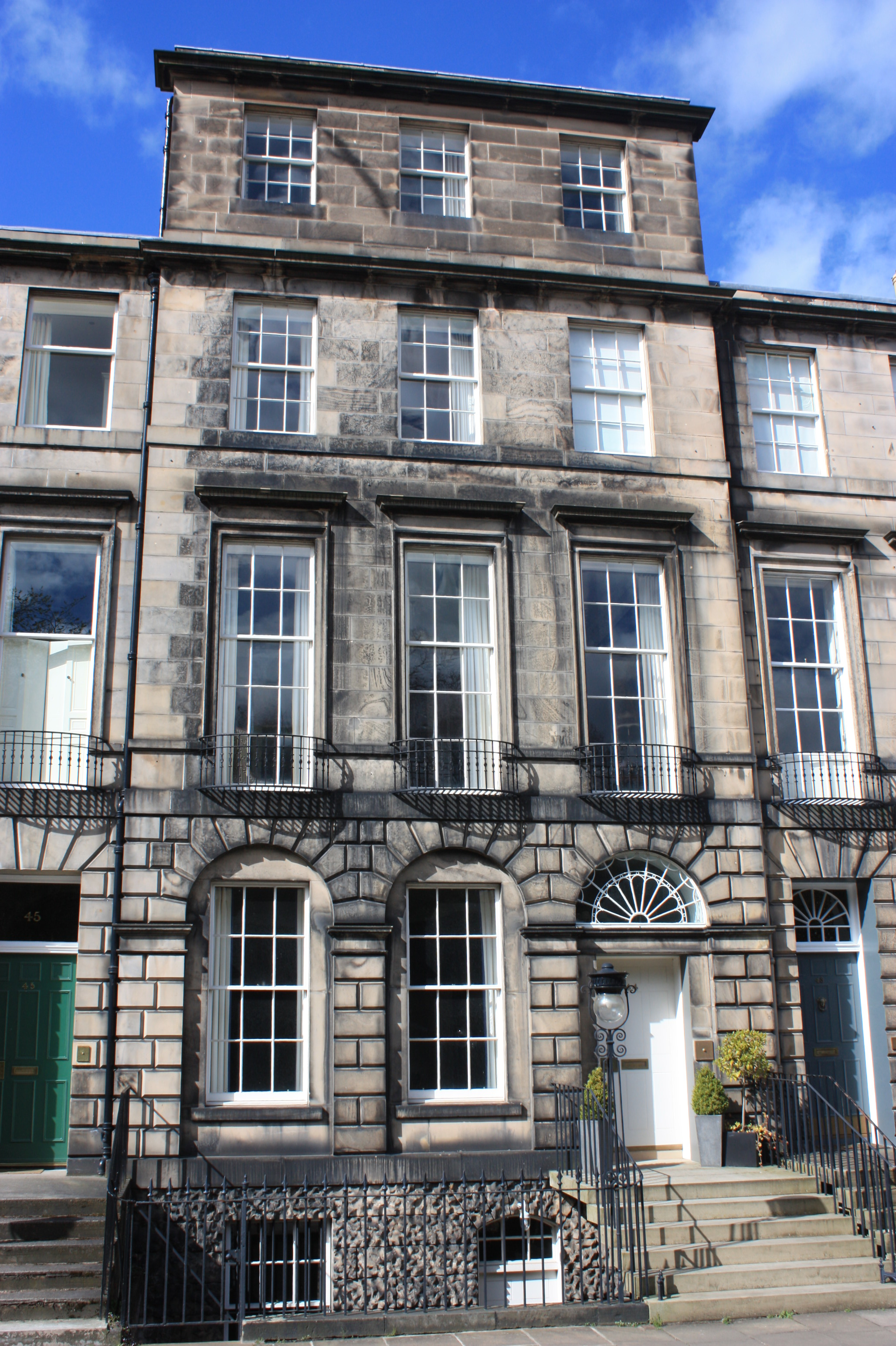
44 Heriot Row, Edinburgh

McNeil studied medicine at the University of Edinburgh graduating with an MB in 1905. At the outset of World War I, he was commissioned as a Major in the Royal Army Medical Corps attached to the Scottish Branch of the British Red Cross Society, and from 1915 to 1918 was in command of the military hospital at Rouen.

After World War I, McNeil returned to the Royal Hospital for Sick Children, and also conducted a lectureship in children's diseases at the University of Edinburgh. On his retirement, Professor McNeil was given the honorary degree of LLD by the university. In 1932 he was elected a Fellow of the Royal Society of Edinburgh. His proposers were James Watt, Sir Edward Albert Sharpey-Schafer, Sir David Wilkie and Arthur Logan Turner. He resigned from the Society in 1948. In 1946, he was elected to the Aesculapian Club of Edinburgh. In 1950 he was elected President of the Harveian Society of Edinburgh.

== Family ==
In 1919, Charles McNeil married Alice Hill Workman, daughter of Thomas Workman, a company director. They did not have any children.
