= David McNeil =

David McNeil(l) may refer to:

- David McNeil (footballer) (born 1995), Scottish footballer
- David B. McNeil (1818–1897), American politician from New York
- Dave McNeil (1921–1993), English footballer
- David McNeill (born 1933), American psychologist and writer
- David McNeill (runner) (born 1986), Australian long-distance runner
