= McNeal =

McNeal is a surname. Notable people with the surname include:

== People ==
- Justin McNeal (born 1976), American writer and Entrepranuer
- Bobby McNeal (1891–1956), English association football player
- Brianna Rollins-McNeal (born 1991), American track and field athlete
- Bryant McNeal (born 1979), American gridiron football player
- Clyde McNeal (1928–1996), American baseball player
- Curtis McNeal (born 1989), American gridiron football player
- Don McNeal (born 1958), American gridiron football player
- Harry McNeal (1878–1945), American baseball player
- Jerel McNeal (born 1987), American basketball player
- Lutricia McNeal (born 1973), American singer
- Red McNeal (1903–?), American baseball player
- Reggie McNeal (born 1983), Canadian gridiron football player
- Robert H. McNeal (1930–1988), American historian
- Roun McNeal (born 1984), American politician
- Roy McNeal (1891–1976), American gridiron football coach
- Tom McNeal (born 1947), American novelist and short story writer
- Travis McNeal (born 1967), American gridiron football player
- Vanessa McNeal (born 1993), American social activist and documentary filmmaker
- Wylle B. McNeal (1885–1975), American home economist

As middle name

- James McNeal Kelly (born 1964), American astronaut
- Henry McNeal Turner (1834–1915), American Methodist bishop and politician

== Fiction ==
- McNeal (play), 2024 stage production centered on the character Jacob McNeal
- President McNeal, character in the Futurama episode "When Aliens Attack"
- Dr. Alice McNeal, character in the video game Ground Control II: Operation Exodus
- Bill McNeal, character in the sitcom NewsRadio

== See also ==
- Clan MacNeil
- McNeil (surname)
- MacNeil
- MacNeill
- MacNeal
- MacNeille
