= Neil =

Masculine given name of Gaelic origin

Neil is a masculine name of Irish origin. The name is an anglicisation of the Irish Niall which is of disputed derivation. The Irish name may be derived from words meaning "cloud", "passionate", "victory", "honour" or "champion". Most authorities cite the meaning of Neil in the context of a surname as meaning "champion".

== Origins ==
The Gaelic name was adopted by the Vikings and taken to Iceland as Njáll (see Nigel). From Iceland it went via Norway, Denmark, and Normandy to England. The name also entered Northern England and Yorkshire directly from Ireland, and from Norwegian settlers. Neal or Neall is the Middle English form of Nigel.

As a first name, during the Middle Ages, the Gaelic name of Irish origins was popular in Ireland and later Scotland. During the 20th century Neil began to be used in England and North America, and grew in popularity throughout the English-speaking world; however, in England, it has recently been eclipsed by the Gaelic form.

The surname Neil is a reduced form of the surname McNeil (from the Gaelic Mac Néill, "son of Niall"), or variant form the surname of Neill (from the Irish Ó Néill and Mac Néill or the Scottish Gaelic Mac Néill, meaning "descendant of Niall" and "son of Niall"). The surname,Neil is traced back to Niall of the Nine Hostages who was an Irish king and eponymous ancestor of the Uí Néill and MacNeil kindred.

The name passed from Ireland to Scotland where it had the Mc/Mac prefix a prefix that already existed in the Irish surname such as Lóegaire mac Néill. Some Scottish McNeills returned to Ireland in the 14th century and are associated with MacNeill, MacGreal, MacReill, and Mag Reil surnames.

The Manx version of the name is Kneal (1598), Kneale (1655), or Kneel (1636). It evolved from McNelle (1408) and MacNeyll (1430) becoming Kneal by 1598.

== Variants ==
Variants of the given name include Neale and Neal. The table below sets out the various surnames derived from Niall and Nial.

Name	Year	Country of origin	Mentioned
MacNele	1289	Scotland	
Neel	1170–1182	England	York Charters
Neil	1260	England	Assize Rolls, Yorks
Nele	1304	England	Subsidy Rolls, Yorks
Nigelli	1195	England	Feet of Fines, Warwicks
Niel	1841	Scotland	A frequent spelling variant of Neil in the 1841 Census of Aberdeenshire
Nel, Neel	1208–1210	England	Curia Regis Rolls, Berkshire

== Notable figures with the given name ==
- Neale Hanvey (born 1964), Scottish politician
- Neil Abercrombie (born 1938), former Governor of Hawaii and U.S. Representative
- Neil Anderson (cricketer) (born 1979), Irish cricketer, right-handed batsman and a left-arm spin bowler
- Neil Andrew (1944–2026), Australian politician and former Speaker of the Australian House of Representatives
- Neil Armstrong (disambiguation), several people
  - Neil Armstrong (1930–2012), American astronaut
- Neil Bogart (1943–1982), American music executive
- Neil Breen, American filmmaker and actor
- Neil Brewer (born 1954), English musician and singer-songwriter
- Neil Buchanan (born 1961), English television presenter, artist and musician
- Neil Callan, Irish horse racing jockey
- Neil Carmichael (English politician) (born 1961), English businessman and academic, MP for Stroud 2010–2017
- Neil Carmichael, Baron Carmichael of Kelvingrove (1921–2001), British Labour Party politician, MP in Glasgow 1962–1983
- Neil Cicierega (born 1986), American artist and Internet personality
- Neil Clark Warren (born 1934), American psychologist and theologian
- Neil Clarke (disambiguation), several people, including those named Neil Clark
- Neil Codling (born 1973), English musician, member of the band Suede
- Neil Cole (disambiguation), several people
- Neil Coleta (born 1991), Filipino actor and TV host
- Neil deGrasse Tyson (born 1958), American astrophysicist, author and science communicator
- Neil Dellacroce (born 1914), Italian American gangster
- Neil Diamond (born 1941), American singer-songwriter, musician, and actor
- Neil Druckmann (born 1978), Israeli-American video game designer and head of creative of Naughty Dog
- Neil Fairbrother (born 1963), English cricketer
- Neil Farrell Jr. (born 1998), American football player
- Neil Finn (born 1958), New Zealand singer-songwriter and musician
- Neil Gaiman (born 1960), English author
- Neil Gorsuch (born 1967), Associate justice of the Supreme Court of the United States
- Neil Hannon (born 1970), Northern Irish singer-songwriter and musician
- Neil Harrison (disambiguation), several people
- Neil Hoffman (c. 1939), American academic administrator, educator, college president
- Neil Innes (1944–2019), English writer, comedian and musician, member of the Rutles, the Bonzo Dog Doo-Dah Band
- Neil Jenkins (disambiguation), several people
- Neil Johnson (disambiguation), several people
- Neil Jordan (born 1950), Irish filmmaker
- Neil Kenlock (born 1950), Jamaican-born photographer
- Neil Kinnock (born 1942), British politician, and former leader of the Labour Party
- Neil L. Andersen (born 1951), American religious leader
- Neil Lennon (born 1971), Northern Irish football coach and former player
- Neil Lumsden (born 1952), Canadian politician and football player
- Neil Lyndon (born 1946), British journalist and author
- Neil MacGregor (born 1946), British art historian
- Neil Martin (disambiguation), several people
- Neil McGregor (disambiguation), several people
- Neil McMenemy (born 1967), Scottish triple jumper
- Neil McVicar (politician), Canadian politician
- Neil Nitin Mukesh (born 1982), Indian actor
- Neil O'Brien (disambiguation), several people
- Neil Patel (designer), Welsh-American production designer
- Neil Patel (political advisor), American publisher and co-founder of The Daily Caller
- Neil Patrick Harris (born 1973), American actor
- Neil Peart (1952–2020), Canadian drummer and lyricist of the rock band Rush
- Neil Perry (born 1957), Australian chef
- Neil Perry (cricketer) (born 1958), English cricketer
- Neil Prakash (born 1991), Australian terrorist
- Neil Reid (disambiguation), several people
- Neil Roberts (disambiguation), several people
- Neil Rowe, Barbadian politician
- Neil Sedaka (1939–2026), American singer, songwriter and pianist
- Neil Simon (1927–2018), American playwright
- Neil Tennant (born 1954), British singer-songwriter of Pet Shop Boys
- Neil the Seal (born 2020), southern elephant seal from Tasmania
- Neil Turk (born 1987), English cricketer
- Neil Wagner (born 1986), South African-born New Zealand cricketer
- Neil Walker (disambiguation), several people
- Neil Young (disambiguation), several people

== People with the surname ==
- Alex Neil (politician) (born 1951), Scottish politician
- Alexandra Neil (born 1955), American actress
- Andrew Neil (born 1949), Scottish journalist and broadcaster
- Andy Neil (footballer) (1892–1941), Scottish footballer
- Chris Neal (disambiguation) (and variants), several people
- Chris Neil (born 1979), Canadian professional ice hockey player
- Dan Neil (American football) (born 1973), American football player
- Dan Neil (journalist) (born 1960), automobile columnist for the Los Angeles Times
- Fred Neil (1936–2001), American singer and songwriter
- María Fernanda Neil (born 1982), Argentine actress and model
- Sam Neill (1947–2026), New Zealand actor
- Sara Neil (cyclist) (born 1960), Canadian cyclist
- Simon Neil (born 1979), Scottish musician
- Tom Neil (1920–2018), British fighter pilot
- Vince Neil (born Vince Neil Wharton, 1961), singer for American metal band Mötley Crüe

== Fictional characters ==
- Neil Goldman, from the Family Guy animated comedy series
- Neil Nordegraf, from Scott Pilgrim

== See also ==
- List of Irish-language given names
- List of Scottish Gaelic given names
- Neal, Kneale, MacNeil, McNeil, Neale, Neill, Nelson, O'Neill, Niel
- Neila (given name)
- Niall, Gaelic form
- Niel (disambiguation)
- Nigel, given name
- Nila (Ramayana)
