= Neal =

Neal (Neil) is a surname and masculine given name of the Gaelic origin. The name may be derived from words meaning "cloud", "passionate", "victory", "honour" or "champion". As a surname, Neil is traced back to Niall of the Nine Hostages who was an Irish king and eponymous ancestor of the Uí Néill and MacNeil kindred. Most authorities cite the meaning of Neal in the context of a surname as meaning champion.

== Surname ==
- Abbie Neal (1918–2004), American country music entertainer
- Adam Neal (born 1990), English rugby league player
- Alice B. Neal (1828–1863), American writer
- Arthur Neal (1903–1982), English footballer
- Blaine Neal (born 1978), American relief pitcher in Major League Baseball
- Bob Neal (Atlanta sportscaster) (born 1942), American sports broadcaster
- Bob Neal (Cleveland sportscaster) (1916–1983), American sports broadcaster
- Charles Lincoln "Link" Neal (born 1978), American internet personality
- Charlie Neal (1931–1996), American baseball player
- Clara Neal (1870–1936), English teacher and suffragette
- Daniel Neal (1678–1743), British historian
- Daquan Neal, American politician
- David Dalhoff Neal (1838–1915), American artist, father of Max Neal
- Diane Neal (born 1976), American actress and political candidate
- Dylan Neal (born 1969), Canadian actor
- Edwin Neal (born 1945), American actor
- Elise Neal (born 1966), American actress
- Eric Neal (1924–2025), Australian businessman
- Evan Neal (born 2000), American football player
- Frederick "Curly" Neal (1942–2020), American basketball player
- Gary Neal (born 1984), American basketball player
- Harrison Neal (born 2001), English footballer
- Jackie Neal (1967–2005), American blues singer
- James Neal (disambiguation)
- Jeff Neal (born 1969), American drummer
- John Neal (disambiguation)
- Joseph Neal (1950–2017), American politician
- Joseph Ladd Neal (1867–?), American architect
- Julian Neal (born 2003), American football player
- Keanu Neal (born 1995), American football player
- Kenny Neal (born 1957), American blues musician
- Larry Neal (1937–1981), American author
- Lloyd Neal (born 1950), American basketball player
- Lorenzo Neal (born 1970), American football player
- Matt Neal (born 1966), British racing driver
- Max Neal (1865–1941), German playwright, son of David Dalhoff Neal
- Mia Neal, American hair stylist, BAFTA and Academy Award winner
- Minnie E. Neal (1858–1945), American photographer and temperance leader
- Patricia Neal (1926–2010), Academy Award-winning American actress
- Patricia Neal (known as Fannie Flagg) (born 1944), American novelist and actress
- Phil Neal (born 1951), English footballer
- Philip Neal, New York City Ballet principal dancer
- Raful Neal (1936–2004), American blues singer
- Rajion Neal (born 1992), American football player
- Richard Neal (born 1949), Democratic Representative representing Massachusetts' 2nd congressional district
- Ryan Neal (born 1995), American football player
- Scott Neal (born 1978), British actor
- Shay Neal (born 1990), New Zealand field hockey player
- Siran Neal (born 1994), American football player
- Stephen Neal (born 1976), American football player
- Stephen L. Neal (born 1934), former North Carolina Democrat in the U.S. House of Representatives (1975–1995).
- Tom Neal (1914–1972), American actor
- Ty Neal, American college baseball coach
- William Neal (born 1947), English painter and graphic designer

== Given name ==
- Neal Adams (1941–2022), American comic book artist and writer
- Neal Agarwal (born 1997), American programmer and game designer
- Neal Ardley (born 1972), English footballer and manager of AFC Wimbledon
- Neal Baer (born 1955), American pediatrician and television writer and producer
- Neal Boortz (born 1945), American radio host
- Neal Brennan (born 1973), American writer, stand-up comedian, actor, director and producer
- Neal Carter (mountaineer) (1902–1978), Canadian mountaineer
- Neal Casal (1968–2019), American guitarist, singer, songwriter and photographer
- Neal Cassady (1926–1968), American beatnik who was the basis for Jack Kerouac's character Dean Moriarty
- Neal Marlens (born c. 1955/1956), American television producer, creator of The Wonder Years
- Neal McDonough (born 1966), American actor and producer
- Neal H. Moritz (born 1959), American film producer
- Neal Morse (born 1960), American singer and multi-instrumentalist musician and composer
- Neal Nelson, American basketball, tennis and golf coach and professor
- Neal Patterson (1949–2017), American businessman
- Neal Purvis (see Neal Purvis and Robert Wade) (born 1961), British screenwriter
- Neal Roese (born 1965), Canadian-American psychologist
- Neal Shapiro (born 1945), American equestrian and Olympic medalist
- Neal Schon (born 1954), American rock guitarist, songwriter, and vocalist
- Neal Shusterman (born 1962), American writer of young-adult fiction
- Neal Stephenson (born 1959), American writer
- Neal Walk (1948–2015), American basketball center
- Neal Watlington (1922–2019), American Major League Baseball player

== Places ==
- Neal, Georgia, a community in the United States
- Neal, Illinois, a community in the United States
- Neal, Kansas, a community in the United States
- Neal, Michigan, a community in the United States

== See also ==
- Mount Neal
- Neale (disambiguation)
- Neil (disambiguation)
- Neill (disambiguation)
- O'Neill (disambiguation)
