= Neil (disambiguation) =

Neil is a masculine given name of Gaelic origin.

Neil may also refer to:

- Neil Road, Singapore
- Neil Island, now Shaheed Island, Andaman Islands
- Nuclear Electric Insurance Limited, a mutual insurance company
- Northeastern Illinois, centered on the Chicago metropolitan area

== See also ==
- Justice Neil (disambiguation)
- MacNeil
- McNeil
- MacNeill
- McNeill (disambiguation)
- Neal
- Neale (disambiguation)
- Neill
- O'Neill (disambiguation)
- Nail (disambiguation)
- Nell (disambiguation)
- Niel (disambiguation)
- Niel, Belgium
- Njáls saga, is a thirteenth-century Icelandic saga
