= J. Galen Buckwalter =

- Born: Lancaster County, Pennsylvania
- Education: Fuller Theological Seminary (M.Div., Ph.D.)
- Occupations: Clinical psychologist; Data scientist

J. Galen Buckwalter is a data scientist known for development of the online dating platform eHarmony and for advocating for research participant rights in controlling their own clinical data.

== Personal life ==
Buckwalter attended Octorara Junior-Senior High School in Lancaster County, Pennsylvania where he competed in the cross country team and played baritone in the school band. He was part of the local community of Mennonites.

In 1973 at age 16, Buckwalter visited Susquehannock State Park to swim in the Susquehanna River. His friends dove into the river from an embankment with no problem. When Buckwalter jumped in, he hit a submerged rock and was injured. His friends took him to Lancaster General Hospital, where the surgeon explained the serious nature of the injury. From then, Buckwalter was paralyzed from the chest down, and used a wheelchair for mobility. He did rehabilitation at the regional Hospital for Crippled Children.

After highschool he attended PennWest Edinboro for its unique program supporting students with disabilities, and there completed an undergraduate degree in social work. He went on to Fuller Theological Seminary where he completed a master's degree in theology and a doctorate in clinical psychology.

== Career ==
Buckwalter joined University of Southern California as a research professor, then took a role as data analyst in the research unit of Kaiser Permanente. While there, he met Neil Clark Warren, for whom he consulted to do the data analysis for the algorithms at the founding of the eHarmony online dating platform established in 2000.

In 2017 Buckwalter started his own data analysis and consulting company, psyML, which provided interpretations of consumer behavior for large companies including Red Bull, Logitech, and Nike, Inc.

== Research participant rights ==
In 2024, Buckwalter became a research participant in a clinical trial in which had a brain–computer interface implanted into his skull through a craniotomy. He was 69 years old at the time, and wanted to contribute to scientific progress to support people with paralysis in interfacing with computer devices. The process inserted computer chips from Blackrock Neurotech into his brain, and those chips enabled him to use his thoughts to operate a computer, move his fingers, and compose music.

While pleased with the progress, Buckwalter joined the research with the expectation that he could have access to the data which the devices collected through his research participation. The study organizers disagreed, and argued that the data collected was their exclusive property, and that Buckwalter could not have a copy of it. Buckwalter joined other research participants in an organization called "BCI Pioneers Coalition", which studies informed consent in the context of BCI research and seeks to advocate for research participant rights.
