= Kneale =

Kneale is a surname of Manx origin. The name is an Anglicisation of the Gaelic Mac Néill, meaning "son of Niall".

== People ==
- Bryan Kneale (1930–2025), Manx artist and sculptor
- Campbell Kneale, New Zealand musician who formed Birchville Cat Motel
- Jane Heal (née Kneale; born 1946), British philosopher
- Martha Kneale (née Hurst; 1909–2001), British philosopher
- Matthew Kneale (born 1960), British writer
- Nigel Kneale (1922–2006), Manx writer
- Patricia Kneale (1925–2008), British film and television actress
- Paul Kneale (born 1986), Canadian artist
- Tim Kneale (born 1982), British sport shooter
- Victor Kneale (1918–2007), Manx politician
- William Kneale (1906–1990), English logician

== See also ==
- Neal
- Neil
- Knill
- MacNeil
- McNeil
- Neale
- Neill
- Nelson
- O'Neill
