= Orion (1840s magazine) =

American literary magazine (1842–1844)

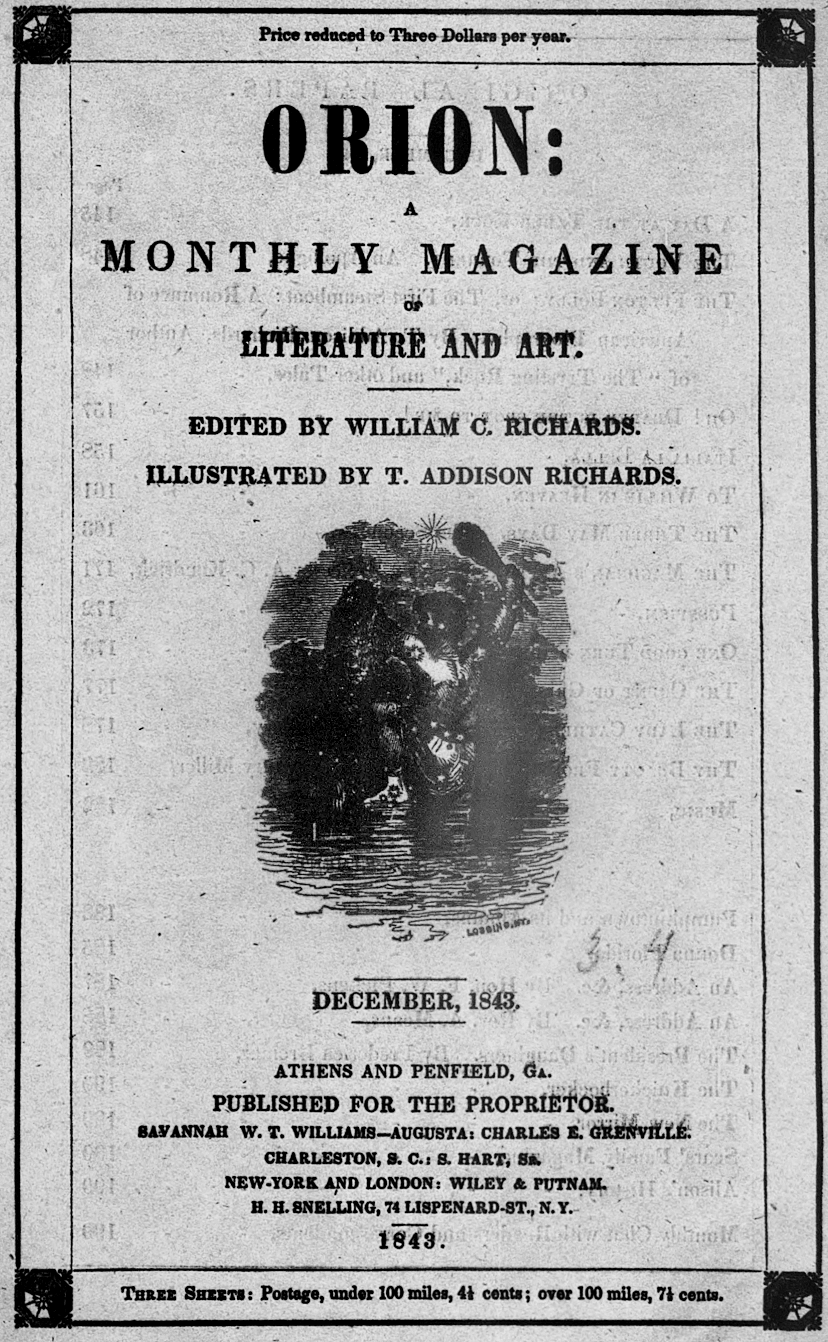
- Cover of the December 1843 issue
- Editor: William Carey Richards
- Categories: Literary magazine
- Frequency: Monthly
- Format: Octavo
- Founder: William Carey Richards
- First issue: March 1842; 183 years ago
- Final issue: August 1844; 180 years ago
- Country: United States
- Based in: Penfield, Georgia (later, Charleston, South Carolina)
- Language: English
- OCLC: 8738489

Orion was an American literary magazine founded by William Carey Richards in March 1842.

== History ==
Richards started Orion while living in Penfield, Georgia, with the intention of fostering the growth of literature produced in the South. He distinguished the magazine from one merely dedicated to Southern literature, explaining:

[We] will not say southern literature, for we have a decided distaste for such local expressions, as if literature were of different characters in the South and in the North. It is the same every where except in degree and tone, and its advancement, its elevation in the South, is the proper object of our desires and efforts.

It was named for the Orion constellation at the suggestion of William Tappan Thompson, later an editor. The first issue of the magazine, published in March 1842, resembled the typography and appearance of the Knickerbocker, published around the same time, though Richards denied any intentional emulation.

The magazine, not affiliated with any particular denomination or religious group, aimed to uplift literary standards in the South. Within its sixty-four pages it featured a diversity of literary works, with contributions from prominent writers hailing from both the South and North, such as William Gilmore Simms. Richards' family, including his wife Cornelia Richards, his brother Thomas Addison Richards, and his sister, also contributed to the magazine.

Richards took on various roles in addition to being editor, contributing literary criticism, essays, humour and poetry.

Seeking to expand the magazine's reach and influence, he relocated the magazine to Charleston, South Carolina in early 1844. However, despite these efforts, the magazine ceased publication after just six months there, ending in August 1844.

== Legacy ==
Although criticized by some contemporaries, Orion overall received praise for its typographic quality, content, and Richard's contributions. Its significance lied in Richards's efforts to foster literature in the South and being the first of his contributions in that vein, such as his later magazine ventures the Southern Literary Gazette and the Schoolfellow.
