= HipGeo =

HipGeo is a free Los Angeles–based developer of an LBS app designed for use on Apple iOS devices developed by Scott Daniel, Rich Rygg, and Jeff Kunzelman. The app was launched in January 2012.

The application, which is compatible with any iPhone or iPad running iOS 3.5 or above, allows users to share their photos, and automatically create a record of the routes and places they go without Check-in. Users can share photos, routes, and places through the HipGeo app, via email, SMS, or by using a variety of other social networking products such as Facebook and Twitter, while controlling their privacy.

== Company ==
The company was founded in August 2010, by its three co-founders without any financing with the idea of being the “Mint for Geolocation”. The company did not receive any outside financing until May 2011, when they announced receiving $500K in funding from a variety of investors, including Morado Venture Partners, a seed-stage fund run by former Yahoo! executives Ash Patel and Michael Marquez. Other investors include Galen Buckwalter, former chief scientist of eHarmony, and prominent San Diego–based angel investor Robert Bingham.

Scott Daniel, Rich Rygg, and Jeff Kunzelman originally met over 15 years ago when Rich acquired Futuretouch for GeoCities as VP General Manager, and the three of them moved to northern California to work for Yahoo! in 1999.

In February 2011 Marshall Kirkpatrick wrote in ReadWriteWeb that “HipGeo:Tech Veterans Tackle Geo 2.0”.

In April 2011 Benjamin F. Kuo interviewed Rich Rygg in Socaltech.com.
