= Neal S. Young =

American physician and researcher

- Born: April 13, 1947 (age 79); New York City, New York, United States
- Education: Harvard College, Johns Hopkins School of Medicine
- Occupations: physician and researcher
- Known for: Intramural Research Program of the National Institutes of Health
- Notable work: over 500 scientific articles
- Spouse: Genoveffa Franchini
- Children: 3
- Awards: awards and honors

Neal Stuart Young (born 1947) is an American physician and researcher, chief of the Hematology Branch of the National Institutes of Health (NIH), and Director of the Center for Human Immunology at the NIH in Bethesda, Maryland. He is primarily known for his work in the pathophysiology and treatment of aplastic anemia, and is also known for his contributions to the pathophysiology of parvovirus B19 infection.

== Biography ==
Young was born in New York City on April 13, 1947. He received an A.B. from Harvard College in 1967, and a M.D. from Johns Hopkins School of Medicine in 1971. His internal medicine residency was at Massachusetts General Hospital. In 1976, he completed a clinical fellowship in the Hematology-Oncology Division at Barnes Hospital, Washington University School of Medicine.

Young's entire career has been in the Intramural Research Program of the National Institutes of Health in Bethesda, Maryland. He has been Chief of the Hematology Branch of the National Heart, Lung, and Blood Institute since 1994 and was appointed Director of the Trans-NIH Center for Human Immunology, Autoimmunity, and Inflammation in 2007.

He is married to Genoveffa Franchini, an expert in retroviruses and HIV in the National Cancer Institute. Their children are Andrea, a professor of physics at the University of California Santa Barbara; Massimo, vice president at Insight Investment of the Bank of New York; and Giorgio, a theoretical mathematician

== Professional work ==
Young joined the U.S. Public Health Service in 1973 and worked at the NIH in the laboratories of Christen Anfinsen (in the immunochemistry of hemoglobin) and Arthur Nienhuis (in globin gene regulation). He directed the first multicenter clinical trial using antithymocyte globulin for the treatment of aplastic anemia in the United States. This therapy is now the standard treatment for the disease worldwide. He is credited with contributing to understanding the pathophysiology of the disease as immune-mediated and with developing immunotherapy for aplastic anemia that has dramatically improved survival rates for the disease. In the early 1980s, the disease was largely fatal with survival rates around 10% one year following the diagnosis, whereas now survival rates are 90% or better.

He also made major contributions to the understanding of parvovirus B19 infection. He identified the erythrocyte antigen P (globoside) as the cell receptor for parvovirus B19 and that P antigen deficiency confers resistance to parvovirus B19 infection. Young characterized the subsequent hematologic manifestations in patients with sickle cell disease immune deficient individuals. He developed a candidate recombinant vaccine against parvovirus B19 infection.

In the 1990s, Young initiated and implemented a formal epidemiologic study of aplastic anemia in Thailand, which revealed a much higher incidence rate than in the West. Coincidentally, he established a teaching program an NHLBI-sponsored teaching program in Vietnam, for which he later received a Government of Vietnam Service to the People Award.

In 2005, he and his postdoctoral fellow, Rodrigo Calado, described the first mutations in the telomerase gene, TERT, in patients with aplastic anemia. Deficiency in telomerase genes causes telomere shortening, reduced hematopoietic stem cell function, and bone marrow failure. He later found that telomerase mutations also are a risk factor for acute myeloid leukemia and hepatic liver cirrhosis. In his most recent work, he has pioneered single cell genomic studies in bone marrow failure diseases, and is part of the VEXAS (Vacuoles, E1 enzyme, X-linked, Autoinflammatory Syndrome) discovery team at NIH.

Young has published over 500 scientific articles, original research as well and reviews, which span basic molecular and cell biology, clinical research, and epidemiology and are highly cited. He was an editor for Seminars in Hematology for 20 years and has written or edited many monographs and textbooks. An article addressing the economics of scientific publishing in PLoS Medicine attracted media attention. His laboratory and clinical program have trained many leaders in the hematology and bone marrow failure, who head departments in the United States, Europe, South America, and Asia. His Winner’s Curse essay of 2008 was an influential contribution to the literature on scientific publishing; in 2023, he was a Visiting Fellow at New College, Oxford, to address language issues in science from a philosophic perspective.

== Awards and honors ==
- Castle Lecture, Harvard Medical School, Boston (1994)
- Aggeler Lecture, University of California School of Medicine, San Francisco (1995)
- Honorary Professor, Chinese Academy of Medical Sciences and Peking Union Medical College (1999)
- G. Burroughs Mider Lecture, National Institutes of Health (2005)
- Leadership in Science Award, Aplastic Anemia Myelodysplastic Syndromes International Foundation (2007)
- E. Donnall Thomas Lecture and Award, American Society of Hematology (2008)
- Adolfo Storti Prize, Italian Society of Hematology (2009)
- William C. Moloney Lectureship, Brigham and Women's Hospital, Harvard Medical School, Boston, 2009
- Outstanding Work in Science as Related to Medicine, American College of Physicians (2010)
- Honorary Doctor of Philosophy, Jichi Medical School (2011)
- Samuel J. Heyman Service to America Medal, Science & Environment (2012)
- Clement A. Finch Visiting Professor in Hematology, University of Washington (2014)
- Erasmus Hematology Award, Erasmus MC, Rotterdam (2017)
- Government of Vietnam, Service to the People Medal (2017)
- Ernest Beutler Prize, American Society of Hematology (2018)
- Visiting Fellow, New College, Oxford University (2022)

== Selected publications ==
=== Books ===
- Young, Neal S., Stanton L. Gerson, and Katherine A. High. eds. Clinical Hematology. Philadelphia: Mosby/Elsevier, 2006.
- Rodgers, Griffin P., and Neal S. Young., eds. Bethesda Handbook of Clinical Hematology. Philadelphia: Lippincott Williams & Wilkins, 2005.
- Young, Neal S., and Joel Moss. Paroxysmal Nocturnal Hemoglobinuria and the Glycosylphosphatidylinositol-Linked Proteins. San Diego: Academic Press, 2000.
- Young, Neal S. Viruses and Bone Marrow: Basic Research and Clinical Practice. New York: M. Dekker, 1993.
- Young, Neal S., and Blanche P. Alter. Aplastic Anemia, Acquired and Inherited. Philadelphia: Saunders, 1994.
- Young, Neal S., ed. Viruses As Agents of Haematological Disease. London: Baillière Tindall, 1995.

=== Review Articles ===
- Calado RT, Young NS. Telomere diseases. N Engl J Med. 2009 Dec 10;361(24):2353-65.
- Young NS. Aplastic Anemia. N Engl J Med. 2018 Oct 25;379(17):1643-1656.
- Mustjoki S, Young NS. Somatic Mutations in "Benign" Disease. N Engl J Med. 2021 May 27;384(21):2039-2052

=== Recent Original Research ===
- Townsley DM, Dumitriu B, Liu D, Biancotto A, Weinstein B, Chen C, Hardy N, Mihalek AD, Lingala S, Kim YJ, Yao J, Jones E, Gochuico BR, Heller T, Wu CO, Calado RT, Scheinberg P, Young NS. Danazol Treatment for Telomere Diseases. N Engl J Med. 2016 May 19;374(20):1922-31.
- Townsley DM, Scheinberg P, Winkler T, Desmond R, Dumitriu B, Rios O, Weinstein B, Valdez J, Lotter J, Feng X, Desierto M, Leuva H, Bevans M, Wu C, Larochelle A, Calvo KR, Dunbar CE, Young NS. Eltrombopag Added to Standard Immunosuppression for Aplastic Anemia. N Engl J Med. 2017 Apr 20;376(16):1540-1550.
- Beck DB, Ferrada MA, Sikora KA, Ombrello AK, Collins JC, Pei W, Balanda N, Ross DL, Ospina Cardona D, Wu Z, Patel B, Manthiram K, Groarke EM, Gutierrez-Rodrigues F, Hoffmann P, Rosenzweig S, Nakabo S, Dillon LW, Hourigan CS, Tsai WL, Gupta S, Carmona-Rivera C, Asmar AJ, Xu L, Oda H, Goodspeed W, Barron KS, Nehrebecky M, Jones A, Laird RS, Deuitch N, Rowczenio D, Rominger E, Wells KV, Lee CR, Wang W, Trick M, Mullikin J, Wigerblad G, Brooks S, Dell'Orso S, Deng Z, Chae JJ, Dulau-Florea A, Malicdan MCV, Novacic D, Colbert RA, Kaplan MJ, Gadina M, Savic S, Lachmann HJ, Abu-Asab M, Solomon BD, Retterer K, Gahl WA, Burgess SM, Aksentijevich I, Young NS, Calvo KR, Werner A, Kastner DL, Grayson PC. Somatic Mutations in UBA1 and Severe Adult-Onset Autoinflammatory Disease. N Engl J Med. 2020 Dec 31;383(27):2628-2638.
- Patel BA, Groarke EM, Lotter J, Shalhoub R, Gutierrez-Rodrigues F, Rios O, Quinones Raffo D, Wu CO, Young NS. Long-term outcomes in patients with severe aplastic anemia treated with immunosuppression and eltrombopag: a phase 2 study. Blood. 2022 Jan 6;139(1):34-43.
- Groarke EM, Feng X, Aggarwal N, Manley AL, Wu Z, Gao S, Patel BA, Chen J, Young NS. Efficacy of JAK1/2 inhibition in murine immune bone marrow failure. Blood. 2023 Jan 5;141(1):72-89.
