= Nella (disambiguation) =

Nella is a feminine given name. It may also refer to:

- Nella, Arkansas, United States, an unincorporated community
- Nella Island, Victoria Land, Antarctica
- Nella Rock, Mac. Robertson Land, Antarctica, a reef
- Tyler Nella (born 1988), Canadian alpine skier
- Nella Canada, manufacturer of the C7 Nella bayonet

== See also ==
- MV Nella Dan, Australian research vessel, one of the Dan series
- Nela (disambiguation)
