= Kate DuBose =

- Born: September 19, 1826; Hook Norton
- Died: May 26, 1906 (aged 79); Sparta
- Relatives: Thomas Addison Richards

Katherine Ann Richards DuBose (September 19, 1826 – May 26, 1906) was an American author who often published under the name Leila Cameron.

Katherine Ann Richards was born on September 19, 1826 in Hook Norton, Oxfordshire, England, the daughter of Rev. William Richards, a Baptist clergyman who later emigrated to the United States. Her siblings were the painter Thomas Addison Richards, Civil War diarist Samuel Pearce Richards, clergyman and author William Carey Richards, and poet Amelia Sarah Richards Williams. In 1848, she married Charles Wilds DuBose, a lawyer and politician. Charles DuBose was also executor of the estate which Amanda America Dickson inherited.

DuBose's literary output was mostly stories and poems published in magazines, including the Southern Literary Gazette, Orion, and Schoolfellow. She published a prose story for children called The Pastor's Household in 1858. She provided the lyrics for a Confederate anthem, "God Defendeth the Right", which was published in the Atlanta Southern Confederacy in 1861 as well as in sheet music form by J.C. Schreiner & Sons.

Katherine Ann Richards DuBose died on 26 May 1906 in Sparta, Georgia.
