= Cynthia E. Dunbar =

American hematologist

Cynthia Dunbar
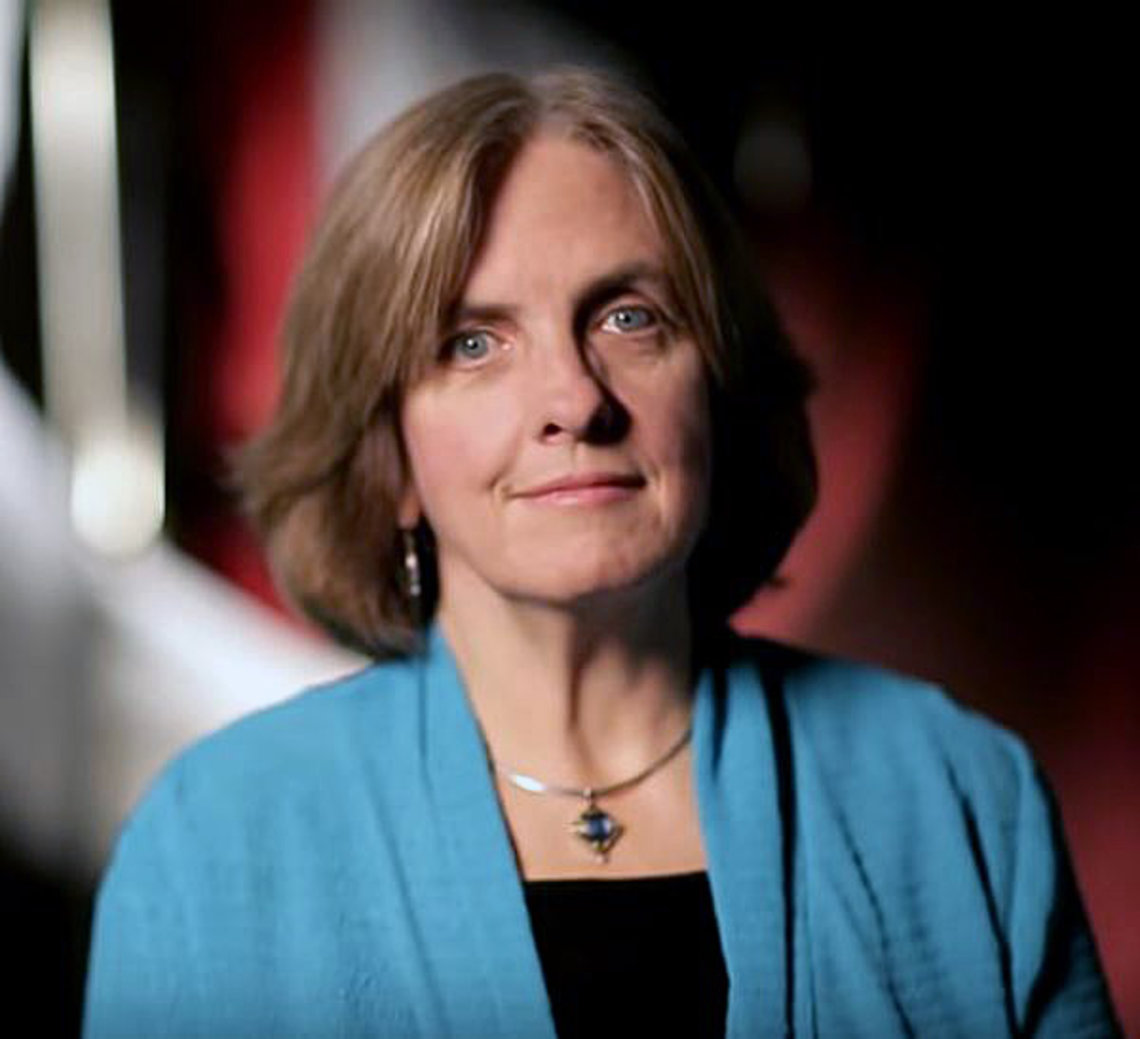
- Dunbar in 2023
- Born: Syracuse, New York
- Education: Harvard University; Harvard Medical School
- Scientific career
- Fields: Hematology
- Workplaces: National Heart, Lung, and Blood Institute

Cynthia Dunbar is an American scientist and hematologist at the National Heart Lung and Blood Institute (NHLBI), which is part of the National Institutes of Health (NIH). She is the Branch Chief of the Translational Stem Cell Biology Branch.

She was the Editor-in-Chief of Blood, the flagship publication of the American Society of Hematology (ASH), from 2007 to 2012. She is currently (2025) Vice-President of ASH and will become President in 2027. In 2020, she was elected to the National Academy of Medicine for "leading pioneering genetic marking and therapy trials targeting hematopoietic stem cells, and developing uniquely predictive non-human primate models to successfully improve the safety and efficiency of various gene therapies as well as gain insights into hematopoiesis and immunology".

== Early life ==
Dr. Dunbar was born in Syracuse, New York. She moved to Westport, Connecticut, at a young age and attended Staples High School. During her sophomore year, a close friend developed Hodgkin lymphoma, a cancer stemming from white blood cells lymphocytes. While he underwent treatment at Yale New Haven Hospital, she visited him frequently. She decided to pursue a career in medicine after he died during their senior year.

Dunbar earned a B.A. magna cum laude in History and Science from Harvard University in 1980. She received an M.D. magna cum laude from Harvard Medical School in 1984. She completed an internal medicine internship and residency at Boston City Hospital, and did a hematology fellowship at University of California, San Francisco.

== Career ==
In 1987, Dunbar started at the NIH as a postdoctoral fellow in the laboratory of Arthur W. Nienhuis. She became an independent Investigator in 1993, and became Head of the Molecular Hematopoiesis Section in 2000. She served as the program director for the NIH/NHLBI clinical hematology fellowship program for 17 years.

Dunbar's current research at the Molecular Hematopoiesis laboratory in the Translational Stem Cell Biology Branch focuses on understanding the biology and clinical applications of stem cells. The research centers on haematopoiesis, the development and differentiation of stem cells into multiple types of blood cells. Her research focuses on hematopoiesis in vivo and optimizing and improving the safety of gene transfer for therapeutic purposes.

Dunbar's laboratory utilizes a rhesus macaque transplantation model, and her facility is one of only a handful worldwide able to successfully support non-human primates through stem cell transplantation. Dunbar's team has developed new gene therapy vector systems for high-efficiency transduction of hematopoietic stem and progenitor cells. Recently, her laboratory has focused on developing, testing, and optimizing gene-editing technologies such as CRISPR/Cas9.

Her recent clinical work has focused on strategies to expand human in vivo hematopoietic stem cells, including a trial of the stem cell stimulatory cytokine analog eltrombopag for the treatment of patients with aplastic anemia. The trial resulted in the first FDA-approved new drug to treat aplastic anemia in over 30 years.

Dunbar's research team has also focused on what happens when hematopoietic stem cells age and whether that might explain why older adults have increased risk for blood cancers and other blood-related illnesses. Her team has found that stem cell abnormalities that arise as a part of aging may contribute to an increased risk of heart disease and even the inflammatory response seen in some patients with COVID-19.

Dunbar became an associate editor of Blood in 1998 and served in that position until she was selected as the first female Editor-in-Chief of Blood. She served in that position between 2007 and 2012. She, along with Ezekiel Emanuel, revived the NIH Assembly of Scientists to advise NIH leadership and represent the concerns of NIH's scientific and clinical staff in top-level decision-making.

She is a past president of the American Society of Gene and Cell Therapy. She was a faculty member for the ASH-European Hematology Association Translational Research Training in Hematology program from 2011 to 2016 and was co-director in 2016.

== Personal life ==
Dunbar resides in Washington, D.C., with her husband, whom she met singing in the Choral Arts Society of Washington. She has two children.

== Awards ==
Dunbar has received numerous awards for teaching, mentorship, and research, including:

- NIH Clinical Center Distinguished Clinical Teacher Award
- John Decker Memorial Lectureship
- Brigham and Women's Hospital Moloney Award and Lectureship
