= 2005 Monaco Grand Prix =

Coordinates: 43°44′4.74″N 7°25′16.8″E

Race 6 of 19 in the 2005 Formula One World Championship
← Previous race	Next race →

Race details
- Date: 22 May 2005
- Official name: Formula 1 Grand Prix de Monaco 2005
- Location: Circuit de Monaco, Monaco
- Course: Street circuit
- Course length: 3.34 km (2.075 miles)
- Distance: 78 laps, 260.52 km (161.85 miles)
- Weather: Fine

Pole position
Driver	(Finland) Kimi Räikkönen	McLaren-Mercedes
- Time: 2:30.323 (aggregate)

Fastest lap
Driver	(Germany) Michael Schumacher	Ferrari
- Time: 1:15.842 on lap 40

Podium
First	(Finland) Kimi Räikkönen	McLaren-Mercedes
Second	(Germany) Nick Heidfeld	Williams-BMW
Third	(Australia) Mark Webber	Williams-BMW

The 2005 Monaco Grand Prix (formally the Formula 1 Grand Prix de Monaco 2005) was a Formula One motor race held on 22 May 2005 at the Circuit de Monaco in Monte Carlo, Monaco. It was the sixth race of the 2005 Formula One World Championship, and the 63rd running of the Monaco Grand Prix.

The 78-lap race was won from pole position by Finnish driver Kimi Räikkönen, driving a McLaren-Mercedes. German Nick Heidfeld finished second in a Williams-BMW with his teammate, Australian Mark Webber, achieving his first F1 podium finish in third. Drivers' Championship leader, Spaniard Fernando Alonso, finished fourth in his Renault.

== Report ==
The Grand Prix was held one month after the death of Prince Rainier III, for this reason, the Monegasque princely family did not attend the race for the first time in the Monaco Grand Prix's history. The BAR-Honda did not take part in this race, serving the last of a two race ban following irregularities at the San Marino Grand Prix. Jenson Button subsequently served as a guest co-commentator for British broadcaster ITV for this race.

=== Friday drivers ===
The bottom six teams in the 2004 Constructors' Championship were entitled to run a third car in free practice on Friday. These drivers drove on Friday but did not compete in qualifying or the race.

Constructor	No	Driver
McLaren-Mercedes	35	(Austria) Alexander Wurz
Sauber-Petronas		–
Red Bull-Cosworth	37	(Austria) Christian Klien
Toyota	38	(Brazil) Ricardo Zonta
Jordan-Toyota	39	(Monaco) Robert Doornbos
Minardi-Cosworth		–

=== Practice ===
In practice, Christijan Albers lost his car out coming from turn 4 and crashed. Juan Pablo Montoya, Jacques Villeneuve, David Coulthard and Ralf Schumacher crashed as they were coming up high from Beau Rivage. Montoya was judged to be the cause of this incident and thus was forced to start the race from the back of the grid.

=== Race ===
Polesitter Kimi Räikkönen led the field from the start of the race, and though he was at first closely followed by Fernando Alonso, he was more than five seconds ahead by the twentieth lap. Meanwhile, Narain Karthikeyan retired with a hydraulic failure. The race progressed otherwise uneventfully, with Fernando Alonso followed by Giancarlo Fisichella, Jarno Trulli, and Mark Webber, until the twenty-third lap, when Christijan Albers spun his Minardi into a wall at Mirabeau, blocking about two-thirds of the width of the track. David Coulthard, arriving behind him, swerved and successfully stopped his Red Bull without damage; however, Michael Schumacher plowed into Coulthard, breaking off his own nosecone and damaging the Red Bull's suspension beyond repair. As more drivers reached the blocked turn, the Safety Car was deployed so that marshals could remove Albers' car.

Both Renault drivers pitted immediately, but Räikkönen—acting on instructions from McLaren chief strategist Neil Martin—continued on in what was to prove a winning move. Though this seemingly put Räikkönen in a bad spot, as all of his close competitors had pitted, he fought back with a series of brilliant laps that would give him a 34.7-second lead by the time he pitted on lap 42. Alonso, whose car was substantially slower as it was full of fuel, and whose rear tyres were wearing rapidly, was unable to catch up, and Räikkönen, after pitting, returned to the track still 13 seconds ahead. He would go on to win the race having led every lap of it.

Nick Heidfeld worked his way up from sixth grid position, passing his own teammate in the pits after Williams called him in a lap earlier whilst Alonso was badly holding the two Williams drivers up. After Heidfeld's stop, a superb overtaking manoeuvre into the Nouvelle chicane put him ahead of Alonso. Webber tried to follow suit a lap later, but on the first attempt Alonso cut the corner and stayed in front. On the second attempt Alonso cut the corner again, this time clearly intentionally, but Webber eventually succeeded in overtaking him and claiming his first career podium in Formula One and scoring Williams' last double podium finish until the 2014 Abu Dhabi Grand Prix over nine years later. Alonso straggled into fourth, his rear tyres almost entirely bald. Montoya advanced from sixteenth on the grid to an eventual fifth, finishing on Alonso's tail, followed by Michael and Ralf Schumacher, who crossed the line almost side-by-side.

Both Red Bull Racing cars ran with the Star Wars: Episode III – Revenge of the Sith livery and, for this race, the Red Bull Racing pit crew dressed up as Imperial Stormtroopers. It didn't help the team's fortunes, as this was the first race where they failed to score points.

== Classification ==
=== Qualifying ===
Pos	No	Driver	Constructor	Q1	Q2	Total	Gap	Grid
1	9	(Finland) Kimi Räikkönen	McLaren-Mercedes	1:13.644	1:16.679	2:30.325		1
2	5	(Spain) Fernando Alonso	Renault	1:14.125	1:16.281	2:30.406	+0.083	2
3	7	(Australia) Mark Webber	Williams-BMW	1:14.584	1:17.072	2:31.656	+1.333	3
4	6	(Italy) Giancarlo Fisichella	Renault	1:14.783	1:17.317	2:32.100	+1.777	4
5	16	(Italy) Jarno Trulli	Toyota	1:15.189	1:17.401	2:32.590	+2.267	5
6	8	(Germany) Nick Heidfeld	Williams-BMW	1:15.128	1:17.755	2:32.883	+2.560	6
7	14	(United Kingdom) David Coulthard	Red Bull-Cosworth	1:15.329	1:18.538	2:33.867	+3.544	7
8	1	(Germany) Michael Schumacher	Ferrari	1:16.186	1:18.550	2:34.736	+4.413	8
9	11	(Canada) Jacques Villeneuve	Sauber-Petronas	1:15.921	1:19.015	2:34.936	+4.613	9
10	2	(Brazil) Rubens Barrichello	Ferrari	1:16.142	1:18.841	2:34.983	+4.660	10
11	12	(Brazil) Felipe Massa	Sauber-Petronas	1:16.218	1:18.902	2:35.120	+4.797	11
12	15	(Italy) Vitantonio Liuzzi	Red Bull-Cosworth	1:16.817	1:20.335	2:37.152	+6.829	12
13	20	(Austria) Patrick Friesacher	Minardi-Cosworth	1:18.574	1:22.236	2:40.810	+10.487	13
14	21	(Netherlands) Christijan Albers	Minardi-Cosworth	1:19.229	1:22.977	2:42.206	+11.883	14
15	18	(Portugal) Tiago Monteiro	Jordan-Toyota	1:19.408	1:23.670	2:43.078	+12.755	15
16	19	(India) Narain Karthikeyan	Jordan-Toyota	1:19.474	1:23.968	2:43.422	+13.119	17^{1}
17	17	(Germany) Ralf Schumacher	Toyota	No time	No time	No time	—	18^{2}
18	10	(Colombia) Juan Pablo Montoya	McLaren-Mercedes	1:14.858	No time	No time	—	16^{3}

Notes

- ^1 – Narain Karthikeyan received a 10-place grid penalty for an engine change.
- ^2 – Ralf Schumacher received a 10-place grid penalty for an engine change. In addition, his total time was added by 0.5 seconds for using the wrong tire in practice.
- ^3 – Juan Pablo Montoya's Saturday time of 1:14.858 deleted as punishment for role in earlier practice accident.

=== Race ===
Pos	No	Driver	Constructor	Tyre	Laps	Time/Retired	Grid	Points
1	9	(Finland) Kimi Räikkönen	McLaren-Mercedes	MI	78	1:45:15.556	1	10
2	8	(Germany) Nick Heidfeld	Williams-BMW	MI	78	+ 13.877	6	8
3	7	(Australia) Mark Webber	Williams-BMW	MI	78	+ 18.484	3	6
4	5	(Spain) Fernando Alonso	Renault	MI	78	+ 36.487	2	5
5	10	(Colombia) Juan Pablo Montoya	McLaren-Mercedes	MI	78	+ 36.647	16	4
6	17	(Germany) Ralf Schumacher	Toyota	MI	78	+ 37.117	18	3
7	1	(Germany) Michael Schumacher	Ferrari	B	78	+ 37.223	8	2
8	2	(Brazil) Rubens Barrichello	Ferrari	B	78	+ 37.570	10	1
9	12	(Brazil) Felipe Massa	Sauber-Petronas	MI	77	+ 1 Lap	11	
10	16	(Italy) Jarno Trulli	Toyota	MI	77	+ 1 Lap	5	
11	11	(Canada) Jacques Villeneuve	Sauber-Petronas	MI	77	+ 1 Lap	9	
12	6	(Italy) Giancarlo Fisichella	Renault	MI	77	+ 1 Lap	4	
13	18	(Portugal) Tiago Monteiro	Jordan-Toyota	B	75	+ 3 Laps	15	
14	21	(Netherlands) Christijan Albers	Minardi-Cosworth	B	73	+ 5 Laps	14	
Ret	15	(Italy) Vitantonio Liuzzi	Red Bull-Cosworth	MI	59	Accident	12	
Ret	20	(Austria) Patrick Friesacher	Minardi-Cosworth	B	29	Accident	13	
Ret	14	(United Kingdom) David Coulthard	Red Bull-Cosworth	MI	23	Collision damage	7	
Ret	19	(India) Narain Karthikeyan	Jordan-Toyota	B	18	Hydraulics	17	

== Championship standings after the race ==
Drivers' Championship standings

	Pos	Driver	Points
	1	(Spain) Fernando Alonso	49
1	2	(Finland) Kimi Räikkönen	27
1	3	(Italy) Jarno Trulli	26
2	4	(Australia) Mark Webber	18
5	5	(Germany) Nick Heidfeld	17

Constructors' Championship standings

	Pos	Constructor	Points
	1	(France) Renault	63
1	2	(United Kingdom) McLaren-Mercedes	51
1	3	(Japan) Toyota	43
	4	(United Kingdom) Williams-BMW	35
	5	(Italy) Ferrari	21

- Note: Only the top five positions are included for both sets of standings.

== See also ==
- 2005 Monaco GP2 Series round
- 2005 Monaco Porsche Supercup round
- 2005 Monaco Grand Prix Formula Three

Previous race: 2005 Spanish Grand Prix	FIA Formula One World Championship; 2005 season	Next race: 2005 European Grand Prix
Previous race: 2004 Monaco Grand Prix	Monaco Grand Prix	Next race: 2006 Monaco Grand Prix
Awards
Preceded by 2004 Bahrain Grand Prix	Formula One Promotional Trophy for Race Promoter; 2005	Succeeded by 2006 Brazilian Grand Prix
