= Chris Neal (disambiguation) =

Chris or Christopher Neal, Neil, or Neill may refer to:

== Sport ==
- Chris Neal (footballer, born 1947), English winger who played for Darlington
- Chris Neil (born 1979), Canadian ice hockey player
- Chris Neal (born 1985), English footballer who plays for Salford City

== Music and entertainment ==
- Chris Neal (screen composer) (born 1946), Australian musician
- Chris Neal, pseudonym of Daniel Knauf (fl. 1980s–2020s), American television and comic book writer
- Christopher Neil (born 1948), British record producer
- Chris Neill (born 1968), British comedian and radio personality
- Chris O'Neill (animator) (born 1990) Irish animator and internet personality

== Other ==
- Christopher Paul Neil (born 1975), Canadian sex criminal

== See also ==
- Chris Neild (born 1987), American football player, played in NFL for the Washington Redskins and Houston Texans
- Christopher Neil-Smith (1920–1995), Church of England priest and exorcist
