= William Carey Richards =

American magazine editor, minister (1818–1892)

- Born: November 24, 1818; London, United Kingdom
- Died: May 19, 1892 (aged 73); Chicago, United States
- Occupations: Magazine editor, author, minister
- Notable work: Orion; Southern Literary Gazette; Schoolfellow

William Carey Richards (November 24, 1818 – May 19, 1892) was an American magazine editor, author, and Baptist minister, known for his contributions to literature and magazines of the Southern United States during the 19th century.

== Early life ==
Richards was born in London, England on November 24, 1818, to William Richards, a Baptist minister, and Anne Gardener Richards. Richards immigrated to the United States in 1831 with his family, settling initially in New York City, where his father became the minister of a church in Hudson, before the rest of the family relocated to Penfield, Georgia.

Richards stayed in New York and attended Colgate University (then called Madison University), before graduating and moving to Penfield in 1840. In 1841, Richards married Cornelia Richards (née Bradley), also a writer, having met her in New York.

== Career ==
Richards began professionally writing with contributions to the Augusta Mirror, a literary paper published between 1838 and 1841. He later contributed to various periodicals, including the Southern Ladies' Book and Family Companion (Macon, Georgia), the Southern Quarterly Review (Charleston, South Carolina), the Christian Review (Boston, Massachusetts) and The Knickerbocker (New York).

In the 1840s, Richards started his own publications, beginning with the Orion, a literary magazine aimed at fostering literature in the South. This was named after the Orion constellation. Orion featured works by prominent Southern writers of the time, including William Gilmore Simms, as well as well-known Northern writers.

He later founded the Southern Literary Gazette (Athens, Georgia) and the educational magazine Schoolfellow (Athens).

== Later years ==
In the 1850s, Richards shifted his focus to the ministry, serving pastorates in Massachusetts, Rhode Island and Illinois until his death. He continued to write, mainly on religious topics and physical science, popularising these subjects through his lectures in the United States and Canada.

He died on May 19, 1892, at the age of 73 in Chicago.

== Legacy ==
Richards made notable contributions to literature during his relatively short career as a magazine editor, particularly in the South. His magazines, including Orion and the Southern Literary Gazette, aimed to promote Southern writers and cultivate literary growth in the region. Additionally, his publication, the Schoolfellow, contributed to the emergence of popular children's magazines.

== Selected works ==
=== Books ===
- — (1853). A day in the New York Crystal Palace, and how to make the most of it: being a popular companion to the "Official catalogue", and a guide to all the objects of special interest in the New York Exhibition of the Industry of All Nations. New York: G. P. Putnam's Sons. OCLC 85796300.
- — (1858). Electron, or, The pranks of the modern Puck: a telegraphic epic of the times. New York: D. Appleton & Company. hdl:2027/nyp.33433111599910. OCLC 367901794.
- — (1866). Great in goodness: a memoir of George N. Briggs, Governor of the Commonwealth of Massachusetts, from 1844–1851. Boston: Gould and Lincoln. hdl:2027/hvd.32044083467753. OCLC 680805201.
- — (1873) [1854]. Harry's vacation, or, Philosophy at home (Revised ed.). New York: D. Appleton & Company. hdl:2027/loc.ark:/13960/t2b864q8d. OCLC 680285541.

== Personal life ==
Richards had two siblings: a brother Thomas Addison Richards, an artist and engraver, and a sister Kate DuBose (née Richards), who contributed stories and poems to William's periodicals, sometimes under the pseudonym "Leila Cameron".

His marriage to Cornelia produced 5 children: William B. Richards (born June 19, 1842; Midway, Georgia), Herbert V. Richards (born October 26, 1849), Mabel Richards (born February 26, 1856), Cornelia H. Richards (born April 20, 1858), and Cecil A. Richards (born October 15, 1864).
