= Nela (name) =

Nela is a Czech and Slovak feminine given name that serves as a diminutive form of Antonela and Antonie in Croatia, Czech Republic and Slovakia. It is also a Danish, German, Norwegian and Swedish given name that serves as a short form of Cornelia in Denmark, Greenland, Sweden, Norway, Germany, Austria, Namibia, and parts of Switzerland, Hungary and Romania. It is also a surname. Notable people with this name include the following:

== Given name ==
- Nela Álvarez (1919–2009), Filipina actress
- Nela Arias-Misson (1915–2015), Cuban painter and sculptor
- Nela Eržišnik (1924–2007), Croatian actress
- Nela Hasanbegović (born 1984), Bosnian sculptor
- Nela Khan, Trinidad and Tobago politician
- Nela Kuburović (born 1982), Serbian politician
- Nela Lopušanová (born 2008), Slovak ice hockey player
- Nela Martínez (1912–2004), Ecuadorian activist
- Nela Navarro, American professor
- Nela Pocisková (born 1990), Slovak singer
- Nela Vidakovic (born 1981), Serbian singer
- Nela Zisser (born 1992), New Zealand model

== Surname ==
- Havzi Nela (1934–1988), Albanian dissident poet
- Sebastiano Nela (born 1961), Italian footballer

== See also ==
- Nela (disambiguation)
- Nelas, a Portuguese municipality
- Nella, given name
