= Neil Martin (disambiguation) =

Neil Martin may refer to:

- Neil Martin (footballer) (born 1940), Scottish football player and manager
- Neil Martin (swimmer) (born 1955), Australian Olympic swimmer
- Neil Martin (cyclist) (born 1960), British cyclist
- Neil Martin (cricketer, born 1969), English cricketer
- Neil Martin (motorsport) (born 1972), Formula 1 strategist
- Neil Stuart Martin, CBE (born 1978), British Jewish community leader
- Neil Martin (cricketer, born 1979), English cricketer (Middlesex)

== See also ==
- Neal Martin (disambiguation)
