= Nela =

Nela or NELA may refer to:

== People ==
- Nela (name), a given name and surname

== NELA ==
- National Electric Light Association, a defunct organization in the United States
- New England Library Association
- Northeast Los Angeles

== Other uses ==
- Nela (film), a 2018 Sinhalese film by Bennett Rathnayake
- Nela (river), in Spain
- Nela Park, the headquarters of GE Lighting in East Cleveland, Ohio

== See also ==
- Nella (disambiguation)
