= Niall O'Brien =

Niall O'Brien may refer to:

- Niall O'Brien (actor) (1946–2009), Irish actor
- Niall O'Brien (cricketer) (born 1981), Irish cricketer
- Niall O'Brien (hurler) (born 1994), Irish hurler
- Niall O'Brien (priest) (1939–2004), Irish Columban missionary priest

== See also ==
- Neil O'Brien (disambiguation)
