= Neal Martin =

Neal Martin may refer to:

- Neal Martin (ice hockey)
- Neal Martin (wine critic)

== See also ==
- Neil Martin (disambiguation)
