= Neil Clarke =

Neil Clarke or Clark may refer to:

- Neil Clarke (soccer), Scottish-American soccer player
- Neil Clarke (editor) (born 1966), American editor
- Neil Clarke (Australian footballer) (1957–2003), Australian rules footballer
- Neil Clark (musician) (born 1958), British guitarist
- Neil Clark (rugby union) (born 1981), English rugby union player

== See also ==
- Neil Clark Warren (born 1934), American clinical psychologist, theologian and professor
