= Franco Zambonelli =

Computer science professor

Franco Zambonelli is a full professor in Computer Science at the University of Modena and Reggio Emilia, Italy, since 2010.

== Education and career ==
He received the PhD in Electronics and Computer Science from the University of Bologna in 1997, and started his activity at the University of Modena and Reggio Emilia in 1997.

His research interests include ubiquitous computing and internet of things, self-organizing and self-adaptive systems, and distributed artificial intelligence. His nearly full list of publications can be found at DBLP.

He was named an IEEE Fellow in 2014 "for contributions to software engineering for self-adaptive and self-organizing systems". He is also an ACM Distinguished Member and Member of the Academia Europaea.

In 2018, he received the IFAAMAS Influential Paper Award for the article "Developing Multiagent Systems: the Gaia Methodology".
