= Clodoveo Ferri =

Italian scientist (born 1947)

- Born: 22 March 1947 (age 79); Cropani, Calabria, Italy
- Education: University of Pisa (1972)
- Occupation: Italian research scientist
- Spouse: Daniela Onofrio
- Children: Paolo, Marianna
- Scientific career
- Fields: Rheumatology
- Workplaces: University of Modena and Reggio Emilia

Clodoveo Ferri (born 22 March 1947) is an Italian researcher in the field of clinical rheumatology, immunology and internal medicine. A native of Cropani, a small town in Calabria, Italy, Clodoveo Ferri graduated cum laude from the University of Pisa and later specialized in internal medicine and rheumatology.

From January 2003 to November 2017, Clodoveo Ferri was Professor of Rheumatology, Chief of the Chair of Rheumatology and director of the Postgraduate School of Rheumatology at the University of Modena and Reggio Emilia in Modena, Italy. Following his retirement, he continued his activity as a research collaborator at the same University.

Since 1972, the majority of Ferri's work is mainly devoted tof systemic sclerosis, cryoglobulinemic vasculitis (mixed cryoglobulinemia) and other autoimmune systemic disorders.

- For in-depth overview of studies on 'systemic sclerosis' go to Systemic Sclerosis Studies on Etiopathogenesis Clinical Manifestations Prognosis Survival.

His most notable discovery regards the causative role of the hepatitis C virus (HCV) in the majority of patients with mixed cryoglobulinemia (cryoglobulinemic vasculitis) and in a significant percentage of patients with B-cell non-Hodgkin's lymphoma.

- For an in-depth overview of studies on “HCV, cryoglobulinemia, and lymphoma” go to Overview of the Research Line: from Mixed Cryoglobulinemia (Cryoglobulinemic Vasculitis) to HCV infection, Autoimmunity, and Oncogenesis.

Ferri is a member of the SIR (Italian Society of Rheumatology) and GISC (Italian Group for the Study of Cryoglobulinemias), ALCRI (Italian Association for the Fight against Cryoglobulinemias) and an international fellow of the American College of Rheumatology.

== Scientific activity ==
Ferri's work includes clinical and laboratory investigations of different autoimmune and neoplastic diseases; in particular, he investigated the pathogenetic role of some viruses in mixed cryoglobulinemia (cryoglobulinemic vasculitis) and systemic sclerosis (scleroderma). In 1991, soon after the discovery of the hepatitis C virus (HCV), he demonstrated the presence of serum viral genome (HCV-RNA) in a large series of mixed cryoglobulinemia patients. This finding suggested a causative role of HCV in other virus-related extrahepatic manifestations, including autoimmune and lymphoproliferative disorders. The association of HCV with B-cell non-Hodgkin's lymphoma was first demonstrated in 1994. On the basis of these studies, confirmed and expanded by other authors worldwide, Clodoveo Ferri suggested the term "HCV syndrome", which refers to particular autoimmune-neoplastic disease complex triggered by HCV infections in predisposed individuals.

The association of HCV with different diseases represents a good model of study of other virus-driven autoimmune, lymphoproliferative, and neoplastic disorders. The history of this multistep research may be useful for many aspects: a. it may have a stimulating and educational value, especially for student, young researchers, and clinicians, and b. it underlines the relevance of dealing with the complexity frequently present in clinical practice, which requires a multidisciplinary approach.

Moreover, Ferri investigated the pathogenetic role of parvovirus B19 and cytomegalovirus (CMV) in systemic sclerosis (scleroderma).

Ferri has published over 450 scientific papers in international journals, see PubMed on the following topics:

1. Etiopathogenetic role of different viruses in autoimmune and neoplastic diseases:

- 1990-91: identification of HCV as the main triggering factor of mixed cryoglobulinemia (cryoglobulinemic vasculitis).
- 1994: identification of HCV as a triggering factor in a significant percentage of patients with B-cell non-Hodgkin’s lymphoma.
- 1993: possible role of HCV in patients with porphyria cutanea tarda, autoimmune hepatitis, autoimmune thyroiditis, and type 2 diabetes.
- 1999: possible role of HCV in papillary thyroid cancer.
- 1999: possible role of parvovirus B19 and CMV in systemic sclerosis (scleroderma). In this respect, significantly higher prevalence of parvovirus B19 infection was originally demonstrated in both bone marrow and skin of scleroderma patients compared to controls.

2. Serological studies and therapeutic trials on different rheumatic disorders (rheumatoid arthritis, SLE, systemic sclerosis, mixed cryoglobulinemia).

3. Etiopathogenesis, clinical features, survival, and treatment of mixed cryoglobulinemia syndrome (cryoglobulinemic vasculitis).

4. Etiopathogenesis and clinical follow-up of Raynaud's phenomenon and systemic sclerosis (scleroderma), including classification, visceral involvement (heart, lung), survival, and treatment. Since 2015, Ferri has been the coordinator of the Italian Systemic Sclerosis Registry (SIR-SPRING).

5. Role of plasmapheresis and dietetic treatments in some rheumatic disorders (cryoglobulinemic vasculitis, SLE, scleroderma, IgA nephropathy).

6. Impact of COVID19 on autoimmune systemic diseases. Since 2020 Ferri is the coordinator of the COVID-19 & ASD Italian Study Group.

Ferri's scientific production and related Hirsch index (H-index) can be found on Google Scholar Scopus and ScholarGPS.

== Personal life ==
Son of Paolo and Marianna (née Paoletti), Ferri is married to Daniela Onofrio and the couple have two children, Paolo and Marianna.
