= Patrick Neill =

Patrick Neill may refer to:

- Patrick Neill (died 1705), Scottish printer
- Patrick Neill (naturalist) (1776–1851), Scottish printer, naturalist and travel writer
- Patrick Neill, Baron Neill of Bladen (1926–2016), member of the House of Lords
