= Orto Botanico dell'Università di Modena e Reggio Emilia =

Botanical garden in Italy

Coordinates: 44.6482°N 10.9331°E

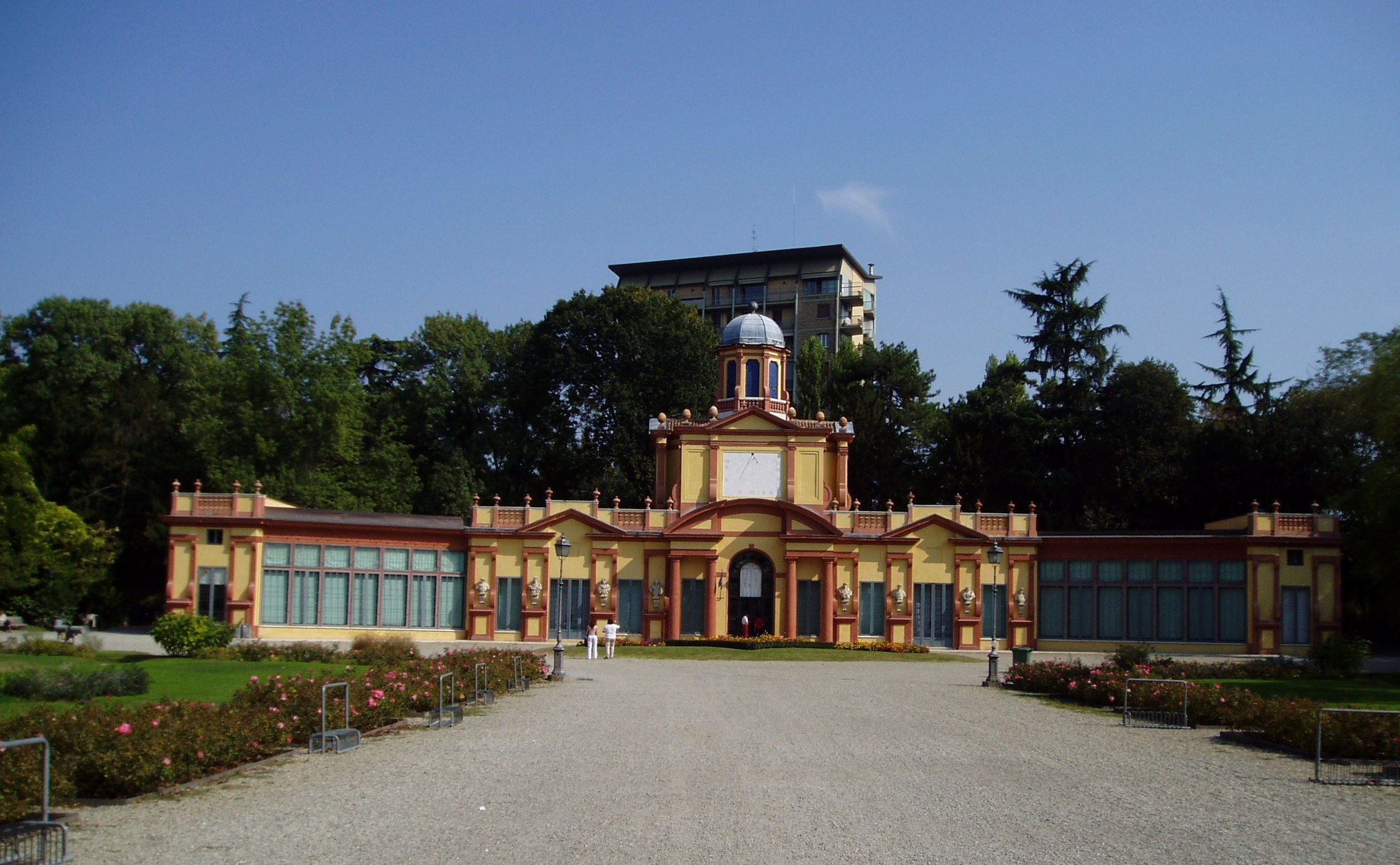
Vigarani Palace in the Public Gardens

The Orto Botanico dell'Università di Modena e Reggio Emilia, also known as the Orto Botanico di Modena or formerly Hortus Botanicus Mutinensis, is a botanical garden operated by the University of Modena and Reggio Emilia. It is located next to the Garden Ducale (Public Gardens), at viale Caduti in Guerra 127, Modena, Italy, and open weekdays during the warmer months except August. Admission is free.

The garden was established in 1758 by Duke Francesco III d'Este for medicinal plants, becoming part of the university in 1772. The garden is an irregular shape, almost 1 hectare in size, with several greenhouses (total area 300 m²) running in a line across the garden's center. It currently contains about 1,400 species plus a major herbarium. The principal outdoor areas are:

- "Montagnola" - "mountains" with an arboretum of almost 200 woody plants, including Abies cephalonica, Aesculus hippocastanum, Fagus sylvatica, Gleditsia triacanthos, Pinus wallichiana, Quercus robur, and Q. ilex.
- Parterre-School - over 2000 m², dating to 1772, principally flowerbeds arranged radially around a central pool with shrubs and herbaceous plants. It currently contains about 700 species, mainly European, including aquilegia, dianthus, iris (over 100 species), potentilla, and salvia.
- Lowlands - irregular flowerbeds, gravel paths, and stone sidewalks.

Greenhouses are as follows:

- Serre Ducale - the garden's most important building, built for winter storage of tender plants, recently adapted to also cultivate tropical species.
- Succulent Plant Greenhouse (mid 1980s) - primarily succulents.
- "Serretta" (1994) - miscellaneous (carnivorous plants, ferns, Orchidaceae, etc.)

== See also ==
- List of botanical gardens in Italy
