= Neila (given name) =

Neila is a feminine given name. Notable people with the name include:

- Neila Gonji (born 1959), Tunisian politician
- Neila Sathyalingam (1938–2017), Singaporean classical Indian dancer, choreographer, and instructor

== See also ==
- Nella
- Neil
