= Knill (surname) =

Knill is a surname of Manx origin and is the equivalent of McNeill, MacNeill or Neill (Mac Néill in Irish; Mac Nèill in Scottish) in Ireland and Scotland. It is derived from the Manx for "son of Neill" and is an alternative to the more common Anglicisation of Kneale. In some cases the surname Knill is of English origin; in this case its meaning is "someone who lived on a hillock".

Notable people with this surname include:

- Alan Knill (born 1964), English football manager and former player
- Frank John Knill (fl. 1918), British Marine, winner of the Conspicuous Gallantry Medal
- Hansrüedi Knill (born 1940), Swiss middle-distance runner
- John Knill (1733–1811), English lawyer and Collector of Customs at St Ives, Cornwall
- John Knill (MP) (16th century), English member of parliament for Radnorshire
- Knill Baronets, in the county of Kent, England
  - Sir Stuart Knill, 1st Baronet (1824–1898), businessman and Lord Mayor of London (1892–1893)
  - Sir John Stuart Knill, 2nd Baronet (1856–1934), Lord Mayor of London (1909–1910)
- Mike Knill (born 1941), Welsh rugby player
- Paolo Knill (1932–2020), Swiss scientist, artist, and therapist
- Richard Knill (1787–1857), English missionary
- William Knill (1859–1940), Australian cricketer
