= Neil Young (disambiguation) =

Neil Young (born 1945) is a Canadian singer-songwriter and guitarist.

Neil Young may also refer to:

- Neil Young (album), the debut album of Neil Young from 1969
- Neil Young (politician) (1936–2015), former Canadian politician
- Neil Young (judge), Australian judge
- Neil Young (footballer, born 1944) (1944–2011), English football winger
- Neil Young (footballer, born 1973), English football defender
- Neil Young (soccer, born 1979), Australian football goalkeeper
- Neil Young, co-founder and CEO of Ngmoco

== See also ==
- Neal S. Young (born 1947), American physician and researcher
