= University of Modena and Reggio Emilia =

University in Italy

- Università degli Studi di Modena e Reggio Emilia
- Latin: Universitas Studiorum Mutinensis et Regiensis
- Type: State-supported
- Established: 1175; 851 years ago
- Rector: Prof.ssa Rita Cucchiara
- Students: 22,205 (a.y. 2015/16)
- Location: Modena and Reggio Emilia, Italy; 44°38′42″N 10°55′40″E
- Campus: Urban
- Sports teams: CUS Modena cusmore.it
- Website: www.unimore.it

The University of Modena and Reggio Emilia (Italian: Università degli Studi di Modena e Reggio Emilia), located in Modena and Reggio Emilia, Emilia-Romagna, Italy, is one of the oldest universities in Europe, founded in 1175, with a population of 20,000 students.

The medieval university disappeared by 1338 and was replaced by "three public lectureships" which did not award degrees and were suspended in the 1590s "for lack of money". The university was not reestablished in Modena until the 1680s and did not receive an imperial charter until 1685.

Some famous students who attended the university include Ludovico Antonio Muratori, a noted Italian historian and scholar who graduated in 1694, the playwright Carlo Goldoni in the 17th century and, in the last century, Sandro Pertini, who became President of the Italian Republic.

== Brief history ==
The University of Modena dates back to 1175, a few decades after the birth of the University of Bologna, making it one of the oldest universities in Italy and the world. It was established by the city of Modena, which financed professors' contracts through local taxation. The first to be invited to teach was Pillio da Medicina from Bologna. The School of Law (Studium iuris) was subsequently formed around him and made up the nucleus of the university.

In the two centuries that followed, the Studium expanded from legal studies to include the training of notaries and the study of medicine as well. The subsequent history of the university was profoundly marked by the changing fortunes of the ruling Este family. Between the sixteenth and seventeenth centuries, when the Court of Este settled in Ferrara, academic titles were no longer awarded, and the activities of the Studium were greatly reduced.

Only after the Court moved to Modena in 1772 did the university regain its original splendour and academic prestige, receiving an imperial charter from Duke Francis II. The university offered multiple disciplines, including law, medicine and surgery, pharmacy, and mathematical, physical, and natural sciences.

The Department of Economics was established in 1968, followed by the Department of Engineering in 1989. The year 1998 was of fundamental importance in the history of the university when the Reggio Emilia site was instituted and the University of Modena and Reggio Emilia was founded, with the support of local institutions.

In fact, Reggio Emilia already had an ancient and noble tradition of university studies which ended in 1772 following the reform of Duke Francis II of Este. A School of Law, proposed by the city, is mentioned as early as 1188. In 1532, the Hapsburg emperor Charles V granted the College of Judges the privilege of awarding diplomas and degrees in Law. Duke Alfonse II of Este established a Medical College in 1561 and ten years later, Emperor Maximilian II authorized the conferral of degrees in medicine. In the seventeenth century, a School of Letters was opened at the Seminary and, in the following century, a chair of Scholastic Theology was established along with schools of grammar and rhetoric. In 1752, the University of Reggio was inaugurated in Palazzo Busetti and consisted of four faculties: Law, Theology, Medicine and Philosophy. However, its activities continued only until 1772 when, after the reform of Francis II, its right to grant degrees was taken away and given solely to the University of Modena.

The creation of the University of Modena and Reggio Emilia not only combined the ancient traditions of the two cities into one institution, but also gave a new and powerful boost to the development of the university, resulting in a substantial growth of scientific and academic activities, which still continues today.

The Department of Engineering and Agriculture was established in Reggio Emilia in 1998, followed in 1999, by the Department of Arts and Humanities in Modena. Subsequently, the university witnessed the birth of the Departments of Communication Sciences and of Education Sciences in Reggio Emilia, while growth continued in Modena with the institution of the Department of Biosciences and Biotechnologies.

== Organization ==
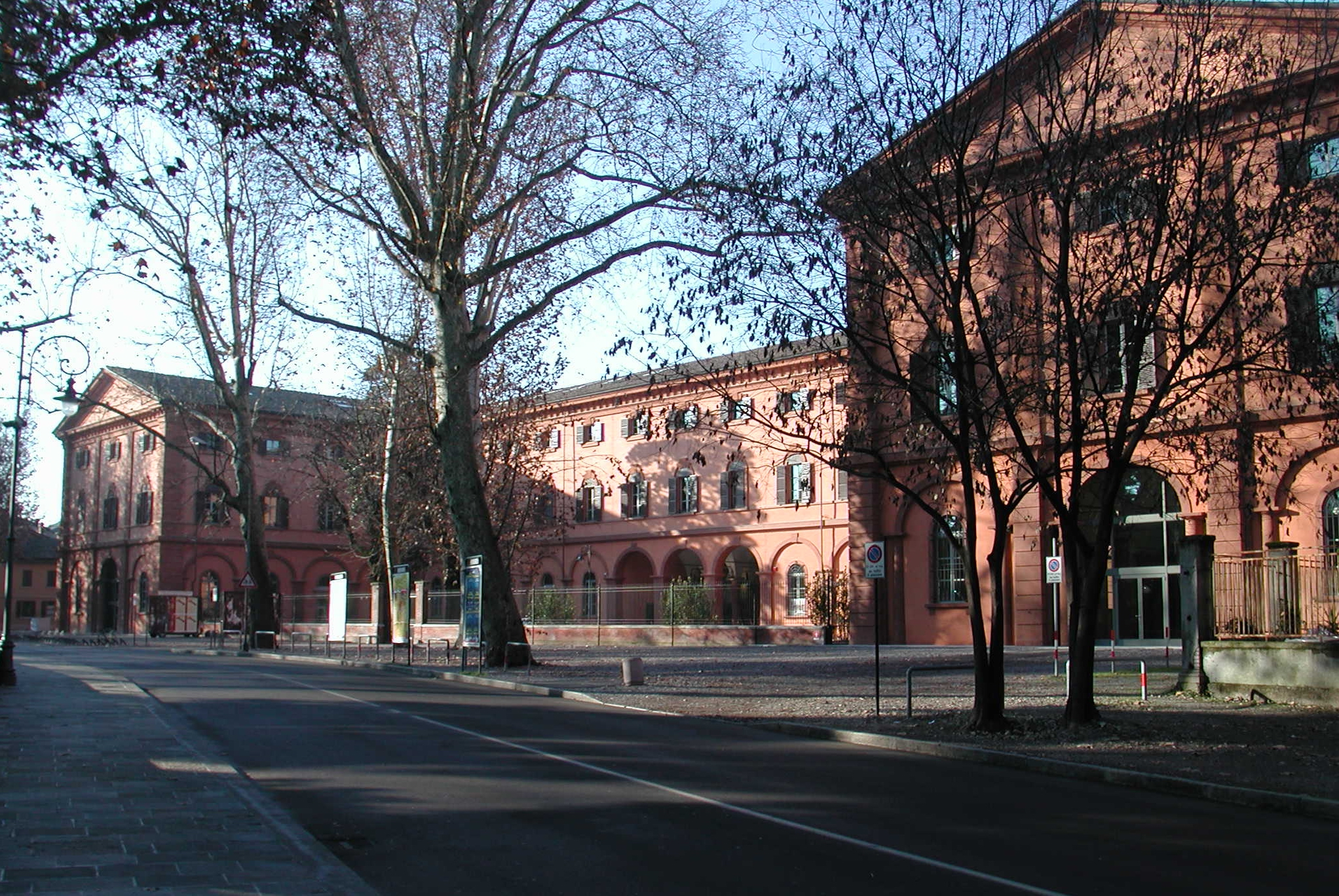
View of the Reggio Emilia campus

The university is divided into fourteen departments:

Area: Technology

- "Enzo Ferrari" Department of Engineering
- Department of Engineering Sciences and Methods

Area: Life

- Department of Life Sciences

Area: Society

- Department of Communication and Economics
- "Marco Biagi" Department of Economics
- Department of Education and Humanities
- Department of Law
- Department of Studies on Language and Culture

Area: Health

- Surgical, Medical and Dental Department of Morphological Sciences related to Transplant, Oncology and Regenerative Medicine
- Department of Diagnostics, Clinical and Public Health Medicine
- Department of Biomedical, Metabolic and Neural Sciences
- Department of Medical and Surgical Sciences

Area: Science

- Department of Chemical and Geological Sciences
- Department of Physics, Informatics and Mathematics

== Points of interest ==
- Orto Botanico dell'Università di Modena e Reggio Emilia, the university's botanical garden
- Osservatorio Geofisico di Modena (Geophysical Observatory of Modena)

== Notable faculty ==
- Clodoveo Ferri — Professor and Chair, Rheumatology
- Paolo Nichelli — Former Professor of Neurology
- Franco Zambonelli — Professor of Computer Science

== Notable alumni ==
- Genoveffa Franchini — hematologist and virologist
- Mattia Binotto — Swiss-born Italian engineer and former team principal of Scuderia Ferrari in Formula One

== See also ==
- List of early modern universities in Europe
- List of Italian universities
