= Paolo Nichelli =

Italian professor of neurology

- Born: Paolo Frigio Nichelli
- Occupations: Neurologist and academic

Academic background
- Education: Secondary School Diploma in Classical Studies, Medicine
- Alma mater: University of Milan

Academic work
- Institutions: University of Modena and Reggio Emilia

Paolo Frigio Nichelli is an academic and former professor of neurology at the University of Modena and Reggio Emilia. His research focuses on cognitive neurology, neuroimaging, and neuropsychology.

As of 2025, his research has received over 14,000 citations according to Google Scholar.

== Education and career ==
Nichelli earned his degree in Medicine from the University of Milan in 1973. He began his academic career in 1977 at the University of Modena and Reggio Emilia as an assistant professor, a position he held until 1986. He was subsequently promoted to associate professor and later to full professor, serving in the latter role from 2001 to 2019. He later continued his research as a senior professor within the university’s Biomedical, Metabolic, and Neuroscience Departments.

From 2001 to 2005, Nichelli was president of the Italian Neuropsychological Society.

== Research ==
Nichelli's research has focused on clinical neurology, neuropsychology, and cognitive neuroscience, with particular attention to the neural basis of higher cognitive functions. He examined disorders of memory, language, and praxis and contributed to the classification of perceptual and associative forms of face recognition disorders and to the understanding of hemispheric damage.

Nichelli also applied functional neuroimaging techniques, including positron emission tomography (PET) and functional magnetic resonance imaging (fMRI), to the study of cognition. He also addressed the neural correlates of pain anticipation, emotional processing, and executive functions. His research has also extended to humor and social cognition. Additionally, he has co‑authored studies on the effects of dopaminergic therapy on problem‑solving in Parkinson’s disease, the neural processing of disparagement humor, and the influence of posed facial expressions on emotion recognition. His later research has focused on stroke treatment and neurodegenerative disorders.

== Selected Articles ==
- De Renzi, Ennio; Nichelli, Paolo (December 1975). "Verbal and non-verbal short-term memory impairment following hemispheric damage". Cortex. 11 (4): 341–354. doi:10.1016/S0010-9452(75)80026-8. PMID 1222578.
- De Renzi, Ennio; Motti, Fabrizia; Nichelli, Paolo (January 1980). "Imitating gestures: A quantitative approach to ideomotor apraxia". Archives of Neurology. 37 (1): 6–10. doi:10.1001/archneur.1980.00500500036003. PMID 7350907.
- Nichelli, Paolo; Bahmanian-Behbahani, Giamileh; Gentilini, Massimo; Vecchi, Alessandro (1988). "Preserved Memory Abilities in Thalamic Amnesia". Brain. 111 (6): 1337–1353. doi:10.1093/brain/111.6.1337. PMID 3208061.
- De Renzi, Ennio; Faglioni, Pietro; Grossi, Dario; Nichelli, Paolo (1991). "Apperceptive and associative forms of prosopagnosia". Cortex. 27 (2): 213–221. doi:10.1016/S0010-9452(13)80125-6. hdl:11380/12027. PMID 1879150.
- Porro, Carlo A.; Baraldi, Patrizia; Pagnoni, Giuseppe; Serafini, Marco; Facchin, Patrizia; Maieron, Marta; Nichelli, Paolo (April 15, 2002). "Does anticipation of pain affect cortical nociceptive systems?". Journal of Neuroscience. 22 (8): 3206–3214. doi:10.1523/JNEUROSCI.22-08-03206.2002. PMC 6757517. PMID 11943821.
- Nichelli, Paolo F.; Grafman, Jordan (March 2024). "The place of Free Will: the freedom of the prisoner". Neurological Sciences. 45 (3): 861–871. doi:10.1007/s10072-023-07138-4. PMID 37870645.
