= Neill =

Neill is an Irish surname, and may refer to

- A. S. Neill (1883–1973), British educator and author
- Alan Webster Neill (1868–1960), Canadian politician
- Alec Neill (born 1950), New Zealand politician
- Ben Neill (born 1957), American composer
- Bob Neill (born 1952), British politician
- Bud Neill (1911–1970), Scottish cartoonist
- Casey Neill, American musician
- Edward Duffield Neill, American minister, author, and educator, secretary to Abraham Lincoln
- Fiona Neill, British author and columnist
- James C. Neill (c.1788–1848), American soldier and politician
- James George Smith Neill (1810–1857), British army general
- Jay Wesley Neill (1965-2002), American murderer
- John R. Neill (1877–1943), American book illustrator
- John W. Neill (1934–2019), British hockey player
- Lucas Neill (b.1978), Australian soccer player
- Noel Neill (1920–2016), American film and television actress
- Patrick Neill (disambiguation), multiple people
- Paul Neill (1882–1968), American electrical engineer
- Reilly Neill, American politician
- Roy William Neill (1887–1946), Irish-American film director
- Sam Neill (1947–2026), New Zealand actor
- Stephen Neill (1900–1984), British Anglican bishop, missionary and scholar
- Terry Neill (disambiguation), multiple people
- Wilfred T. Neill (1922-2001), American herpetologist
- William Neill (disambiguation), multiple people

== See also ==
- O'Neill (disambiguation)
- Neil, a given name of which Neill is a variant
