= Neal Roese =

Canadian-American psychologist (born 1965)

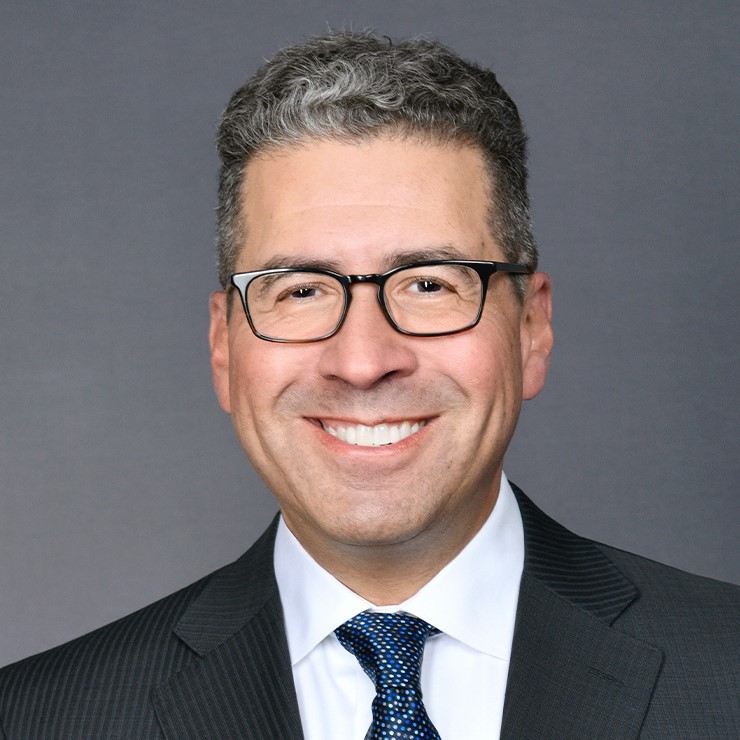
- Roese in 2024
- Born: February 13, 1965 (age 61)
- Education: Ph.D. University of Western Ontario; B.Sc. University of British Columbia
- Known for: Counterfactual thinking
- Awards: Fellow, Society for Personality and Social Psychology
- Scientific career
- Fields: Psychology; Marketing
- Workplaces: Northwestern University; University of Illinois at Urbana-Champaign

Neal Roese (born February 13, 1965) is a Canadian-American psychologist best known for his research on counterfactual thinking and regret. He holds the SC Johnson Chair in Global Marketing at the Kellogg School of Management at Northwestern University. In over 100 publications, his scholarly research examines basic cognitive processes underlying choice, with a focus on how people think about decision options, make predictions about the future, and revise understandings of the past. Roese is a Fellow of the Association for Psychological Science and the Society for Personality and Social Psychology.

== Biography ==
Roese grew up in Vancouver, Canada. He received his B.Sc. in 1987 from the University of British Columbia, his MA in 1990 from the University of Manitoba, and his Ph.D. in psychology 1993 from the University of Western Ontario. After a Postdoctoral Fellowship at the University of California, Santa Barbara, he was appointed Assistant Professor at Northwestern University, Associate Professor and Canada Research Chair at Simon Fraser University, and Professor at the University of Illinois at Urbana-Champaign. He was an Associate at the Center for Advanced Study, University of Illinois, 2008–2009. Dr. Roese returned to Northwestern University in 2009 as Professor of Marketing with a courtesy appointment as Professor of Psychology.

== Academic work ==
Roese has published scholarly articles on topics including memory bias, emotion, and legal decision making. He is the author of the 2005 book, If Only, which focused on the experience of regret in daily life. He edited, with James M. Olson, the 1995 book What might have been: The social psychology of counterfactual thinking (Mahwah, NJ: Erlbaum).

Roese's key contributions include a sequence of theoretical review articles aiming to provide multidisciplinary integrations of empirical findings, including such topics as counterfactual thinking, expectancies, hindsight bias, and self-serving bias.

Roese's research on counterfactual thinking has shown that counterfactual thoughts and regret can be beneficial in that they feed into learning from experience. Certain kinds of counterfactuals and regrets connect specifically to distinct motivational states, such as orientations toward either promotion or prevention.

His research on regret has covered several topics, ranging from decision consequences of regret to the mental health implications of major life regrets. In the latter case, his research on life regrets show that when adults look back on their lives, they are most likely to regret facets of love and work, i.e., personal relationships and career accomplishment.

Roese's research on consumer behavior has focused on the interplay of memory and emotion in consumer choice.

== See also ==
- Counterfactual thinking
- Positive illusions
- Disconfirmed expectancy
