= Genoveffa Franchini =

Italian-American hematologist and retrovirologist

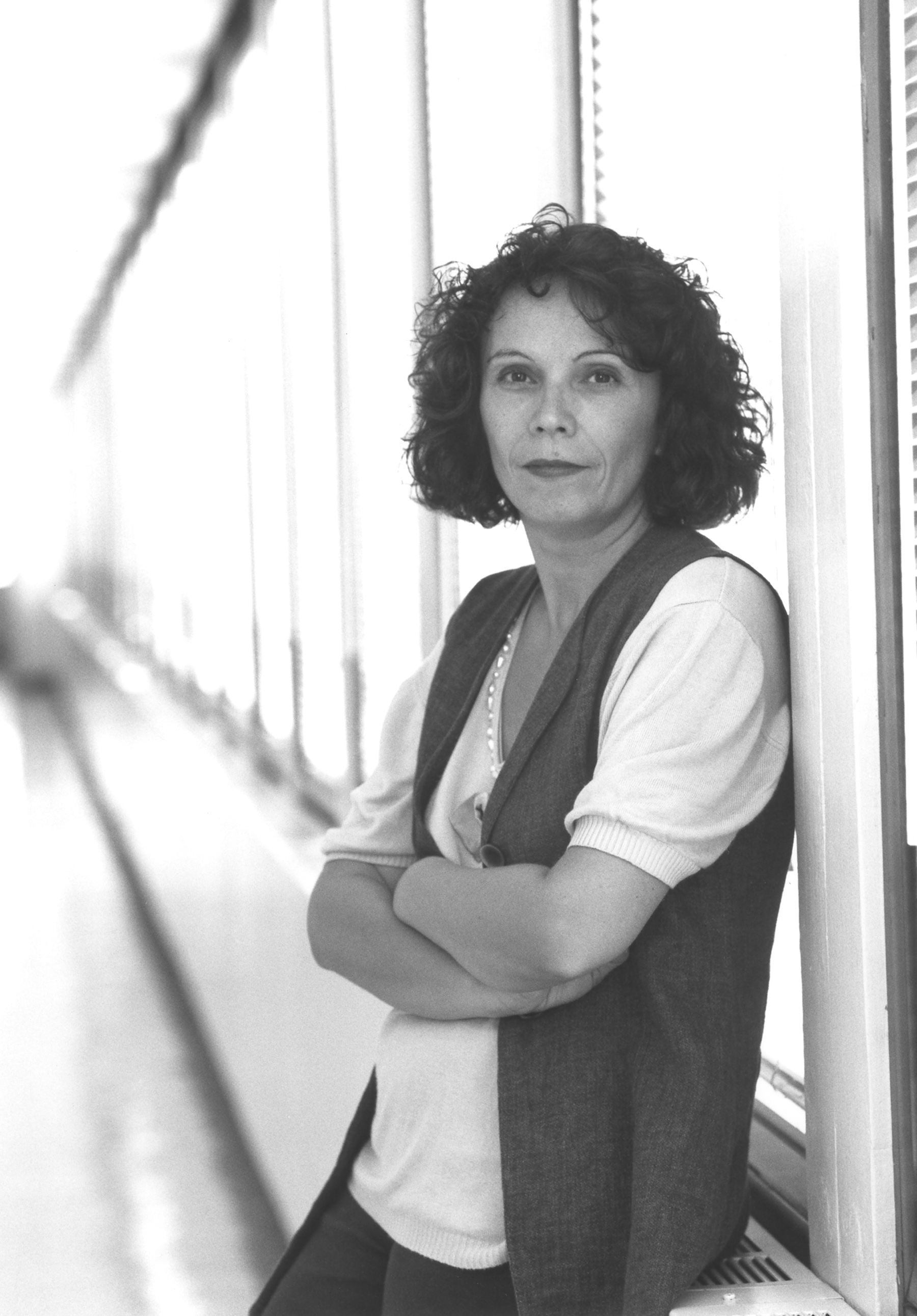
- Education: University of Modena and Reggio Emilia (MD)
- Scientific career
- Fields: Hematology, retrovirology
- Workplaces: National Cancer Institute

Genoveffa Franchini is an Italian-American hematologist and retrovirologist. She is a senior investigator in the vaccine branch and head of the animal models and retroviral vaccines section at the National Cancer Institute. Franchini has pioneered research on oncogenes and human retroviruses. She researches HIV vaccine development and translational methods of disease prevention.

== Early life and education ==
As a teenager in Italy, Franchini intended to conduct service work as a missionary nun. Her focus later shifted to biology and medicine as a means to help patients. She completed a doctor of medicine at University of Modena and Reggio Emilia in 1977. She was a postdoctoral fellow at her alma mater in the hematology institute from 1977 to 1979.

== Career ==
Franchini is a hematologist and retrovirologist. She began working at the National Cancer Institute (NC) in 1979 as a research fellow. Franchini is a senior investigator in the vaccine branch at NCI's Center for Cancer Research. Since 1997, Franchini is head of the animal models and retroviral vaccines section.

=== Research ===
Franchini has pioneered research on oncogenes and human retroviruses (HTLVs and HIVs). She has made numerous achievements in virology and translational approaches to prevent human diseases caused by retroviruses. Her work has furthered the understanding of HIV and HTLV-1 pathogenesis, leading to the identification and characterization of new viral genes for HIV and HTLV-1 and their functions. Franchini's accomplishments in HIV vaccine development include the pre-clinical that led to the first vaccine trial in 16,000 volunteers in Thailand, that has demonstrated significant, though limited, protection against HIV acquisition. Her basic work in immunological mechanisms of protection furthered the understanding of the efficacy of the currently available smallpox vaccine in primates. She also has pioneered strategies to down-modulate regulators of immune response in HIV-1-infected individuals, using the macaque model of SIV infection.

n a 2018 study, research led by Franchini found that macaques receiving certain vaccine regimens that offered protection against simian immunodeficiency virus (SIV) had higher levels of CD14-positive monocytes, suggesting that these immune cells may contribute to vaccine-induced protection.

In research presented at AIDS 2026, Franchini's team tested an experimental HIV vaccine strategy in monkeys that removed part of the HIV envelope protein called the V1 loop, aiming to make another region, the V2 helix, more accessible to antibodies.

== Awards and honors ==
Franchini was elected to the American Society for Clinical Investigation in 1990. In 2007, she was elected to the Association of American Physicians. In 2016, Franchini was awarded the Center for Retrovirus Research Distinguished Career Award by the Ohio State University. She was awarded an honorary Doctor of Science degree by the Medical University of Bialystok, Poland in 2019.
