= Alice B. Neal =

American writer (1828–1863)

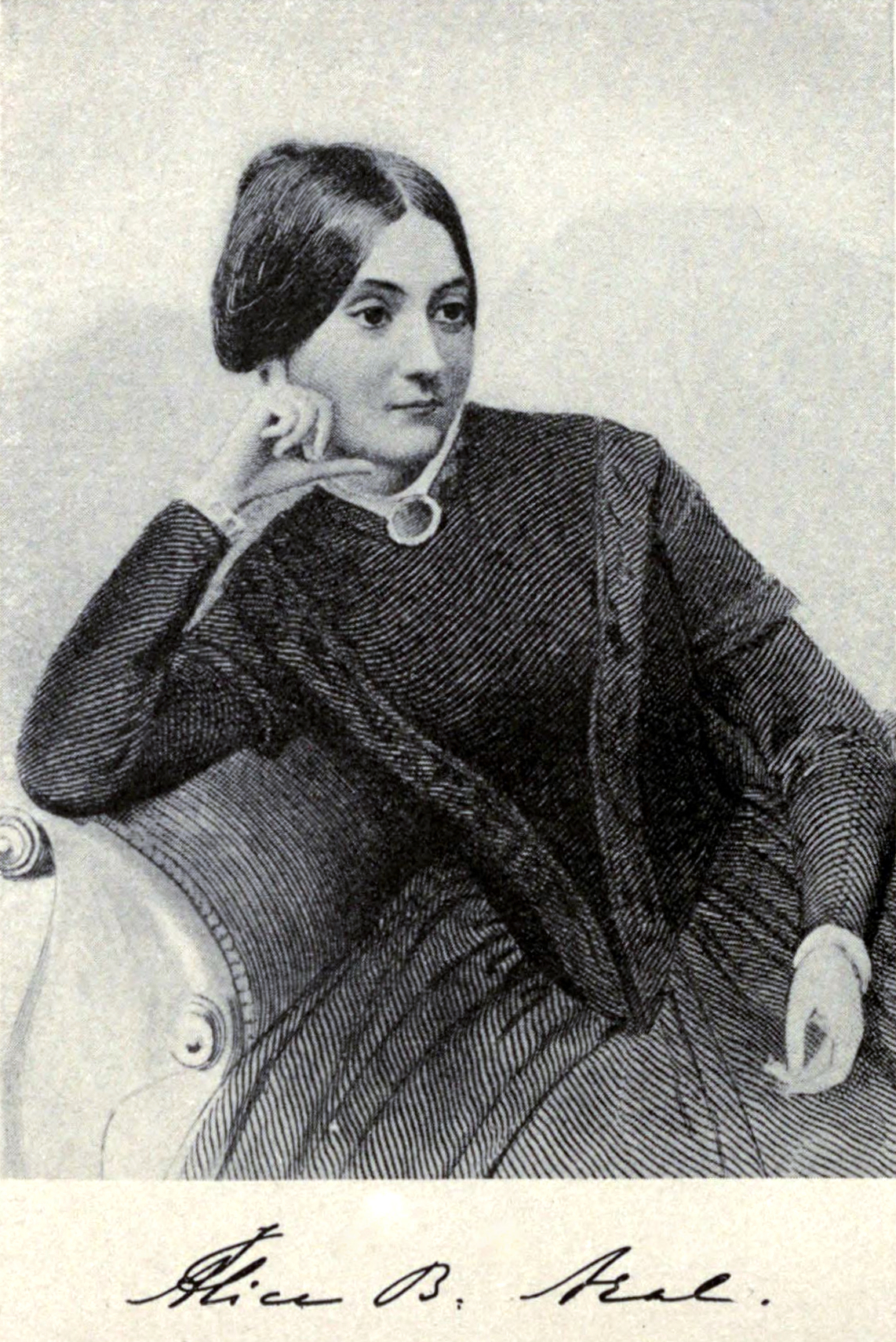
Alice B. Neal

Alice Bradley Neal (September 13, 1827 – August 23, 1863) was a 19th-century American writer. She wrote under many names and aliases: Alice G. Lee, Alice B. Neal, Clara Cushman, Mrs. Joseph C. Neal and Alice B. Haven.

== Life ==
Alice was born on September 13 of 1827 with the given name Emily Bradley in Hudson, New York, and was a widow by age 19. Her first husband was author and editor Joseph C. Neal. She adopted the name Alice in 1846. In 1853, she married again, to broker Samuel Neal, and moved with him to rural New York. They had five children, but she was beset with illness and died shortly after the birth of their last child. Her sister, Cornelia Holroyd Bradley Richards (pen name, "Mrs. Manners"), was also a writer.

== Career ==
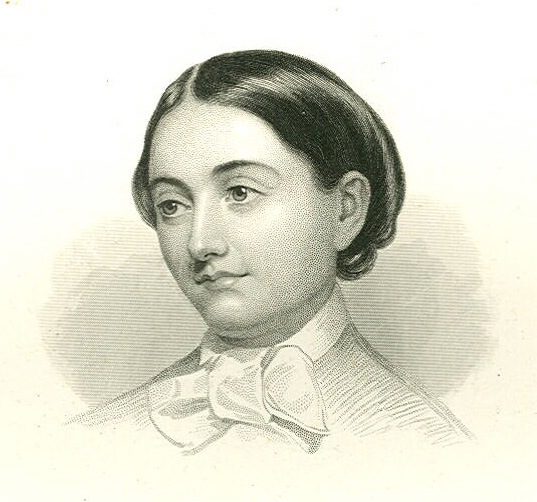
Alice B. Neal

For the Godey's Lady's Book and the Graham's American Monthly Magazine of Literature and Art, both publications out of Philadelphia between the years 1846 and 1864, Alice had over 30 poems and short stories published. She also wrote for The American Female Poets and The Gem of The Western World and did the written accompaniment for her husband's book Neal, Joseph C. Charcoal Sketches. Second Series, published in 1848.

== Selected works ==
1847

- January; "Asking Forgiveness" (poem) (as Alice G. Lee)
- March; "The Blind Wife" (poem) (as Alice G. Lee)
- July; "Love and Glory" (poem) (as Alice Gordon Lee)

1848

- February; "Mistaking the Person" (short) (as Mrs. Joseph C. Neal)
- July; "The Gossips of Rivertown" a.k.a. "Lessons of Charity" (short) (as Mrs. Joseph C. Neal)

1849

- December; "Gossips and Tokens" (short)

1850

- January; "Ideal Husbands" a.k.a. "School-Girl Fancies" (short) (as Mrs. Joseph C. Neal)
- February; "The Nest at Home" (short) (as Mrs. Joseph C. Neal)
- March; "The Young Bride's Trials" (short) (as Mrs. Joseph C. Neal)
- May; "A Gift from Heaven" (short) (as Mrs. Joseph C. Neal)
- July; "Bishop White Administering the Sacrament" (poem and essay) (as Mrs. Alice B. Neal)
- August; "The Christian Mother" (poem) (as Alice B. Neal)
- October; "Which is the Mother?" (short) (as Alice B. Neal)
- November; "Furnishing" a.k.a. "Two Ways of Commencing Life" (short) (as Alice B. Neal)
- December; "A Reminiscence of Jenny Lind" (quotes poem from Wm. C. Richards) (as Alice B. Neal)

1857

• April; “The Flitting,” Godey’s Lady’s Book 54. 1857. Pages 331-339. (As Alice B. Neal)

1858

"Personal Reminiscences of Miss Eliza Leslie," Godey's Lady's Book 56. 1858. Page 344. (As Alice B. Haven)
