= Thomas Addison Richards =

American landscape artist

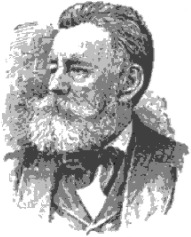
- Born: December 3, 1820; London, United Kingdom
- Died: June 28, 1900 (aged 79); Annapolis, Maryland, United States
- Occupation: Artist

Thomas Addison Richards (December 3, 1820 – June 28, 1900), was an American landscape artist.

== Biography ==
Richards was born in London, UK, and migrated with his family to the United States in 1831. The family first settled in New York, then South Carolina. By 1837 they were in Georgia, where Richards began his career preparing sketches of Georgia scenery. His first book, Georgia Illustrated, appeared in 1841.

Richards sometimes collaborated with his brother William Carey Richards, also an artist and sometimes lecturer who linked fine art and science.

He was associated with the short-lived periodical, created and edited by his brother, the Orion. His subsequent works included American Scenery in 1854, The Romance of American Landscape and Guide to Central Park and a number of other works of landscape and travel.

He died at his nephew's home in Annapolis, Maryland on June 28, 1900.
