= Neil Walker (disambiguation) =

Neil Walker (born 1985) is an American baseball player.

Neil Walker may also refer to:

- Neil Walker (legal scholar) (born 1960), Scottish lawyer
- Neil Walker (swimmer) (born 1976), American swimmer

== See also ==
- Niel Walker (1895–1960), British army officer and cricketer
