= Neal, Georgia =

Unincorporated community in Georgia, U.S.

Coordinates: 33°3′3.46″N 84°29′8.72″W

Neal is an unincorporated community in Pike County, in the U.S. state of Georgia.

== History ==
Neal was originally named Williamsville; the present name, after landowner H. B. Neal, was adopted when the railroad was extended to the area. A post office called Neal was established in 1886, and remained in operation until 1929.
