= Niel =

Niel may refer to:

- Niel, Belgium, town and municipality located in the Belgian province of Antwerp
  - Niel Jaarmarkt Cyclo-cross, cyclo-cross race held in Niel, Belgium, and part of the Cyclo-cross Gazet van Antwerpen
- Prix Niel, Group 2 flat horse race in France
- Niel, Kranenburg, village in the municipality Kranenburg, North Rhine-Westphalia, Germany
- Antoniel dos Santos, Brazilian footballer known as Niel
- Niel (singer), South Korean member of boy group Teen Top

== People with the surname ==
- Adolphe Niel (1802–1869), French Army general and statesman, also Marshal of France
- C. B. van Niel (1897–1985), Dutch-American microbiologist
- Herms Niel (1888–1954), German composer
- Marthe Niel (1878–1928), French aviator
- Xavier Niel (born 1967), French entrepreneur and businessman

== See also ==
- Niall
- Neil
- Niels (disambiguation)
