= Neil O'Brien (disambiguation) =

Neil O'Brien (born 1978) is the Member of Parliament for Harborough.

Neil O'Brien may also refer to:

- Neil O'Brien (cricketer) (born 1945), English cricketer
- Neil O'Brien (quizmaster) (1934–2016), Indian quiz master and Member of Parliament
- Neil O'Brien, manager of Llanelli A.F.C.

== See also ==
- Niall O'Brien (disambiguation)
