= Steve Clark (engineer) =

British engineer

- Citizenship: British
- Occupation: Engineer
- Years active: 1989–2014
- Known for: Motorsport Race Engineer

Steve Clark is a British Formula One and motorsport engineer. He was previously the Chief Race Engineer at Scuderia Ferrari and Honda F1 Racing and a race engineer for Sauber Motorsport, Équipe Ligier, and Team Lotus.

== Career ==
Clark began his motorsport career in the late 1980s at Team Lotus, where he was hired by technical director Frank Dernie. He followed Dernie to Équipe Ligier in 1991, becoming race engineer to Érik Comas. He remained with the team through the mid-1990s, later engineering Olivier Panis during the 1994 and 1995 seasons. In 1996, Clark moved to Arrows International, working with Pedro Diniz, before relocating to the United States in 1998 to serve as engineer to Alex Zanardi at Chip Ganassi Racing in CART. He returned to Formula One in 1999 with Sauber Motorsport, engineering Johnny Herbert, and subsequently went back to American open-wheel racing with PacWest Racing from 2000.

Clark joined McLaren Racing in 2002 as a Senior Test Team Engineer, a role he held until 2007. He was responsible for engineering for the team's extensive testing operations. In 2008, he returned to a trackside role becoming Chief Race Engineer at Honda Racing F1, and playing a senior role in the team's race and test engineering operations. He also acted as a "technical secretary" to Ross Brawn during technical negotiations around the 2009 Formula One Rule Changes. Following Honda's withdrawal from Formula One and the formation of Brawn GP, Clark remained with the organisation as a senior technical advisor and later continued as the team transitioned into Mercedes.

In 2012, Clark joined Scuderia Ferrari as Chief Race Engineer, overseeing race engineering operations within the team. During his tenure, he was involved in an employment dispute concerning his reassignment to non-Formula One projects, which resulted in a court ruling requiring Ferrari to reinstate him to his contracted engineering role.

After leaving Ferrari, Clark continued his career in senior engineering leadership, later working with the HWA Team, including involvement in technical projects linked to Mercedes-affiliated motorsport programmes, such as early Formula E operations.
