= Nella =

Nella is a feminine given name which may refer to:

== People ==
- Nella Alverà (born 1930), Italian curler
- Nella Berg (born 2005), Finnish ice hockey player
- Nella Bergen (1873–1919), American singer
- Nella Bielski (1937–2020), Ukrainian-born French writer
- Nella Maria Bonora (1904–1990), Italian actress
- Nella Brambatti (1949–2020), Italian politician
- Nella Dodds (born 1950), American soul singer
- Nella Donati, Italian medieval noblewoman
- Nella Giacomelli (1873–1949), Italian anarchist
- Nella Larsen (1891–1964), American modernist novelist born Nelly Walker
- Nella Last (1889–1968), British diarist
- Nella Levy (1898–?), a pioneer of Girl Guiding in Australia
- Nella Nobili, Italian poet and writer
- Nella Nyqvist (born 2006), Finnish badminton player
- Nella Pelkonen (born 2005), Finnish figure skater
- Nella Brown Pond (1858–1893), American dramatic reader
- Nella Rojas (born 1989), Venezuelan singer
- Nella Rose (born 1997), Belgian-British media personality
- Nella Simaová (born 1988), Czech former figure skater
- Nella Walker (1886–1971), American film actress and vaudeville performer

== Fictional characters ==
- the title character of Nella the Princess Knight, an American animated children's television series
- Nella, in the Italian fairy tale "The Three Sisters"
- Nella, a main character in the 1902 novel The Grand Babylon Hotel by Arnold Bennett
- Dame Nella Vivante, a character voiced by American actress Susanne Blakeslee in the 2005 video game Scooby-Doo! Unmasked
- Nella Tamminen, a regular character in Finnish soap opera Salatut elämät portrayed by Emma Nopanen.

== See also ==
- Nela (name)
- Nelly (given name)
- Neila (given name)
