= Cornelia Richards =

American author

Cornelia Richards (née, Bradley; pen name, Mrs. Manners; 1822-1892) was a 19th-century American writer who was born in Hudson, New York. Writing under the pen name "Mrs. Manners," she authored a variety of books, including At Home and Abroad, Aspiration, an Autobiography, and a memoir of her sister, the writer Alice Bradley Haven. She was married to a magazine editor and poet and had six children. She died in Detroit, Michigan, at the age of 69.

== Biography ==
Cornelia Holroyd Bradley was born in Hudson, New York, November 1, 1822. She was the daughter of George and Sarah (Brown) Bradley. Her siblings were George Thomas Bradley and the writer, Alice Bradley Haven.

In 1841, she graduated from the Hampton Literary institute, and the same year, on September 21, married William Carey Richards, a magazine editor, poet and scientific lecturer. Their children were William (b. 1842), Herbert (b. 1849), Mabel (b. 1856), Cornelia (b. 1858), Harold (b. 1860), and Cecil (b. 1864).

Richards wrote under the pen name of "Mrs. Manners". She was the author of: At Home and Abroad, or How to Behave (1853); Pleasure and Profit, or Lessons on the Lord's Prayer (1853); Aspiration, an Autobiography (1856); Sedgemoor, or Home Lessons (1857); Hester and I, or Beware of Worldliness (1860); Springs of Adion (1863); and Cousin Alice (1865), a memoir of her sister, Alice B. Haven (1871).

She died in Detroit, Michigan, May 1, 1892.

== Selected works ==
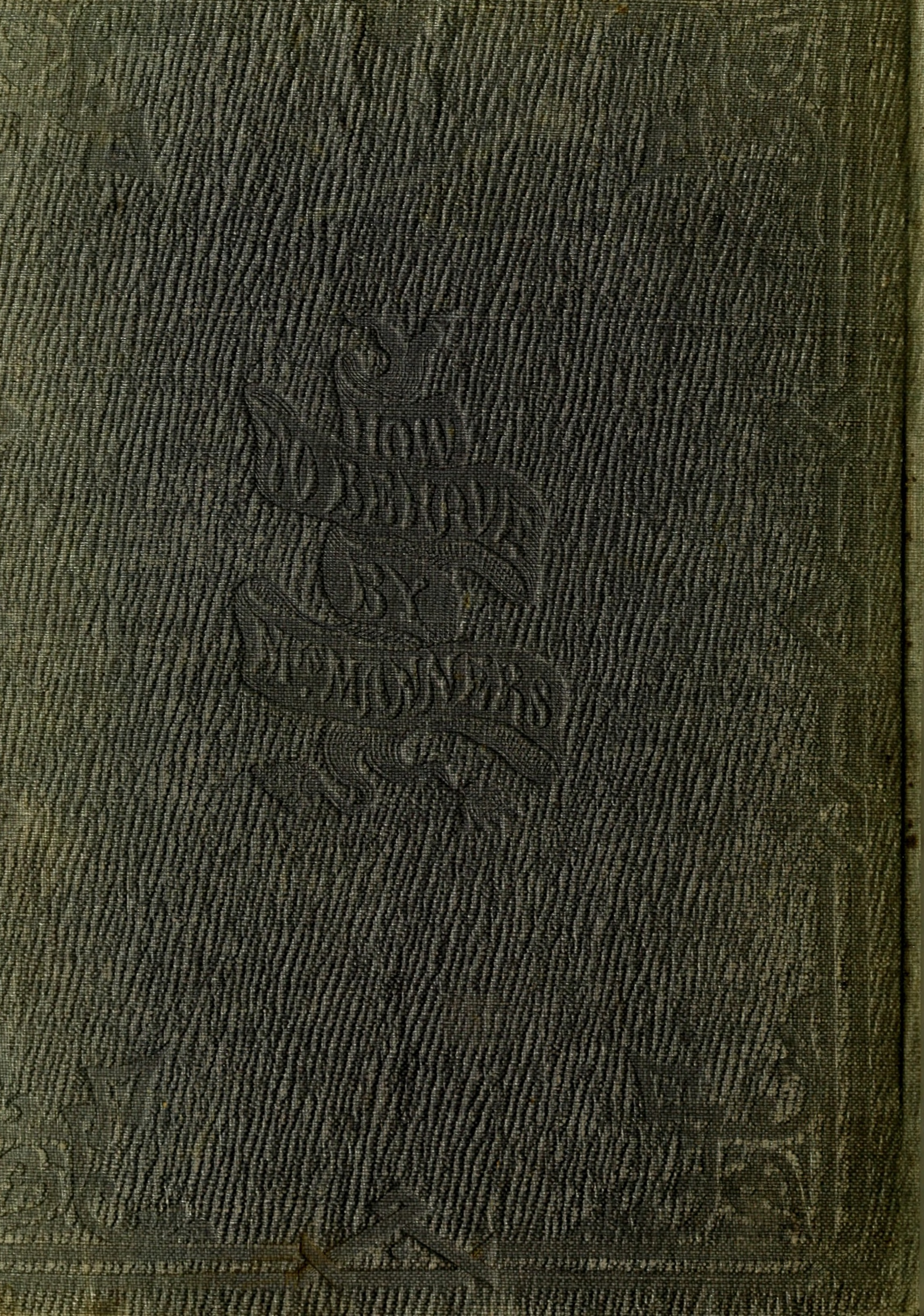
At home and abroad

- At Home and Abroad: Or, How to Behave, 1853 (text)
- Pleasure and Profit, Or, Lessons on the Lord's Prayer: In a Series of Stories, 1853 (text)
- Aspiration: An Autobiography of Girlhood, 1856 (text)
- Sedgemoor, or Home Lessons, 1857 (text)
- Hester and I; Or, Beware of Worldliness, Etc. (With Plates.), 1860 (text)
- Springs of Adion, 1863
- Cousin Alice: A Memoir of Alice B. Haven, 1865 (text)
