= Terry Neill (disambiguation) =

Terry Neill may refer to:

- Terry Neill (1942–2022), Northern Ireland football player and manager
- Terry Neill (racehorse owner), British racehorse owner and Liverpool FC shareholder
