= Patrick Neill (c. 1665–1705) =

Scottish printer

- Born: 1665? Glasgow, Scotland
- Died: 1705?
- Occupation: Printer

Patrick Neill (c. 1665 – c. 1705) was a Scottish printer. He was the first printer in Belfast, Ireland.

== Biography ==
Neill was born in Glasgow, Scotland, circa 1665. He was originally a printer in Glasgow. In 1694 he was brought over to Belfast by William Crafford, or Crawford, sovereign (mayor) of Belfast. Crafford, who was an enterprising merchant and a presbyterian, was placed on the burgess roll in 1686, and removed in 1706 in virtue of the act of parliament disqualifying dissenters; he sat for Belfast in the Irish parliaments of 1703 and 1707. To encourage Neill to introduce the printing business into Belfast, he entered into partnership with him. Neill's books are very rare; a few dated 1697 and 1698 are presumed to be his, but none bearing his imprint are known before 1699. Of that year there is an edition of "The Christian's Great Interest," by William Guthrie, "Belfast: Printed by Patrick Neill and Company," and an edition of "The Psalms of David in Meeter," with similar imprint. Appended to the latter is a list of three religious books "Printed and Sold by Patrick Neill." Of his press work in 1700 four small volumes are extant. "The Psalms of David in Meeter" (of which a copy, bound in tortoiseshell and silver, belongs to the First Presbyterian Church, Belfast) bears the imprint, "Belfast, Printed by Patrick Neil (sic) and Company, 1700." An advertisement at the end of the "Psalms" specifies a New Testament and six more religious books, including the "Pilgrim's Progress," as printed "by and for" Neill; it is not probable that the New Testament was of his own printing. To 1700 also belong his edition of Matthew Mead's "Almost Christian," and John Bunyan's "Sighs from Hell," a small volume of sermons by John Flavel, with life. At the end of the "Almost Christian" is an advertisement specifying six more religious books as printed by Neill. In 1702 his imprint appears on a local work (the only instance), viz., "Advice for Assurance of Salvation," by Robert Craghead (died 22 August 1711), presbyterian minister of Derry. No later imprint of his is known. Neill's will bears date 21 December 1704; hence it is presumed that he died in 1705. He mentions as executors his brother-in-law, James Blow, who married his sister Abigail, and died on 16 August 1759, leaving 40l. to the poor of Belfast (tablet formerly in the old church, now in the Old Poor House, Belfast), and Brice Blair (died January 1722), bookseller and haberdasher, a prominent presbyterian and agent for distribution of regium donum in 1708. Blair was probably one of Neill's company. Neill left three young children, John, James, and Sarah, of whom John was to be brought up to his father's business by Blow. Patrick Neill (1776–1851) is said to have been a descendant of Neill.
