= Neil Harrison (disambiguation) =

Neil Harrison (born 1950) is a British musician and dramatist.

Neil Harrison may also refer to:

- Neil Harrison (umpire) (born 1962), English cricket umpire
- Neil Harrison (curler) (1949–2014), Canadian curler
- Neil P. Harrison (born 1967), American politician from Iowa
