= Neil McGregor (disambiguation) =

Neil McGregor (born 1985) is a Scottish footballer.

Neil McGregor may also refer to

- Neil McGregor (film director), Australian film director
- Neil McGregor (rugby union), 1901–1973, New Zealand rugby player

== See also ==
- Neil MacGregor, (born 1946), British art historian
- McGregor (surname)
- MacGregor (surname)
