= Chris Neal (footballer, born 1947) =

English footballer

Personal information
- Full name: Christopher Neal
- Date of birth: 27 June 1947
- Place of birth: Kirkby-in-Ashfield, England
- Position: Winger

Senior career*
Years	Team	Apps	(Gls)
- Crook Town
1967–1968	Darlington	5	(0)
- * Club domestic league appearances and goals

Christopher Neal (born 27 June 1947) is an English former footballer who played as a winger in the Football League for Darlington.

Neal was born in Kirkby-in-Ashfield, Nottinghamshire. He joined Darlington as an amateur from Crook Town in June 1967, and made five first-team appearances for the club, all in the Fourth Division. He made his debut on 4 March 1968, in a 2–0 home win against Swansea Town, and started four of the next six league fixtures. He then returned to non-league football.
