= Abbie Neal =

American singer-songwriter

Esther "Abbie" Neal (April 4, 1918-February 15, 2004) was an American musician whose career in country music lasted more than 50 years.

== Early years ==
One of eight children, Neal was the daughter of Mr. And Mrs. Carlton M. Neal of Baxter, Pennsylvania. Her brother taught her to play violin when she was eight years old. By the time she was 12, she was part of a family group playing for square dances. For a time she left the violin to play Hawaiian guitar, but then she returned to the violin, which she played with the DuBois Symphony Orchestra.

== Military tours ==
Neil toured five times in Vietnam during the war there. Overall, she performed for U.S. military personnel from 1944 until 1965, with stops including Greenland, Guam, Hawaii, Japan, Korea, the South Pacific islands, Taiwan, Iwo Jima, Labrador, and Saipan.

== Broadcasting ==
A successful audition made Neal a member of the group Phil Reed and his Golden West Girls on radio station WHJB in Greensburg, Pennsylvania. She stayed there 13 years. Later, Neal had a radio program on WAMO and a television program, both in the Pittsburgh, Pennsylvania, area. In the early 1950s, she was featured on WWVA radio in Wheeling, West Virginia, and on television stations WDTV and WENS in Pittsburgh and WJAC in Johnstown. In the mid-1950s, Neal and her band, The Ranch Girls, were featured on the Old Dominion Barn Dance.

Besides performing music, she worked as a disc jockey on radio in Pittsburgh.

== Injury and relocation ==
Neal was hospitalized for 16 weeks after her hip was broken when the car in which she and a member of her musical group were riding skidded on a wet highway and hit a concrete pillar on December 4, 1951. Word of her situation brought unsolicited responses—over 600 handkerchiefs and monetary donations (which she donated to help handicapped children). After recovering from that injury, she moved to Nevada, where she performed in venues in Elko, Lake Tahoe, and Las Vegas. Neal retired in 1975 after a stint at the Golden Nugget Las Vegas. In retirement she and other retired musicians performed for people in senior centers, hospitals, and convalescent facilities.

== Personal life ==
On October 10, 1953, Neal married Eugene B. Johnson, who was her professional manager and a theatrical agent. For 27, years, Neal was married to Mac McKinnon, who died in 1999.

== Death ==
On February 15, 2004, Neal died of a cancer-related illness at Manor Care Health Services in Reno, Nevada, at age 85.

== Legacy ==
One fan of Neal's disc jockey program on WMAO was young Lugee Sacco, who later changed his name to Lou Christie and achieved success with "Lightning Strikes" and other recordings. He cited the influence of Neal on the harmonies in his successful songs. Although other musical artists influenced him to some extent, he said, "... my music has always had lots of vocal harmonies, and that goes back to Abbie Neal." After Neal retired, Christie reconnected with her and the two formed a 20-year friendship that lasted until her death. With her cooperation, he compiled material from her performances on radio, stage, and TV to produce "Abbie Neal and Her Ranch Girls", her final album.
