= Neil Jenkins (disambiguation) =

Neil Jenkins is a rugby union footballer, and coach.

Neil Jenkins may also refer to:

- Neil Jenkins (footballer)
- George Neil Jenkins, commonly known as Neil Jenkins, professor of oral physiology
- Neil Jenkins, character in Gavin & Stacey
