= Arthur W. Nienhuis =

American physician (1941–2021)

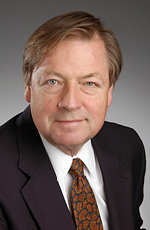
- Born: August 9, 1941
- Died: February 3, 2021 (aged 79)
- Known for: CEO of St. Jude Children's Research Hospital from 1993 to 2004.
- Medical career
- Profession: Doctor
- Institutions: University of Tennessee, St. Jude Children's Research Hospital
- Sub-specialties: Hematology
- Research: bone marrow transplant, gene therapy & genetic testing
- Awards: Stratton Medal

Arthur Wesley Nienhuis (August 9, 1941 – February 3, 2021) was an American physician who served as fourth director and CEO of St. Jude Children's Research Hospital from 1993 to 2004. Prior to joining St. Jude, Nienhuis was chief of the Clinical Hematology Branch and deputy clinical director at the National Institutes of Health's Heart, Lung and Blood Institute. His research interests and expertise in bone marrow transplant, gene therapy and genetic testing paved the way for many advances at St. Jude, including breakthroughs in sickle cell disease and other hematological disorders. Nienhuis also made significant achievements in the fields of cell therapy, HIV/AIDS research and inherited immunodeficiencies. Under his leadership, the hospital completed a $1 billion expansion, which included the addition of a Children's GMP, LLC facility. Additionally, Nienhuis oversaw the creation of the Departments of Developmental Neurobiology and Structural Biology.

Nienhuis received numerous awards, including being named by former president Bill Clinton to the National Cancer Advisory Board in 1998. That same year, he was awarded the Stratton Medal by the American Society of Hematology, one of the society's highest honors for an outstanding body of work in hematology. Additionally, Nienhuis was inducted into the Institute of Medicine of the National Academy of Sciences in 2002.

After completing his tenure at St. Jude Children's Research Hospital, Nienhuis returned to the laboratory, where he continued with his research which included the development of gene transfer for the treatment of hemophilia. He went to emeritus faculty status in 2016.

== Education ==
He received his M.D. degree in 1968 from the UCLA School of Medicine.
