= EHarmony =

American dating website

eharmony.com
- Company type: Private
- Founded: August 22, 2000; 26 years ago Pasadena, California, U.S.
- Headquarters: Los Angeles, California, U.S.
- Key people: Neil Clark Warren (Founder); Greg Forgatch (Founder)
- Parent: ParshipMeet Group (ProSiebenSat.1 Media 55% and General Atlantic 45%)
- Website: www.eharmony.com
- Launched: August 22, 2000; 26 years ago

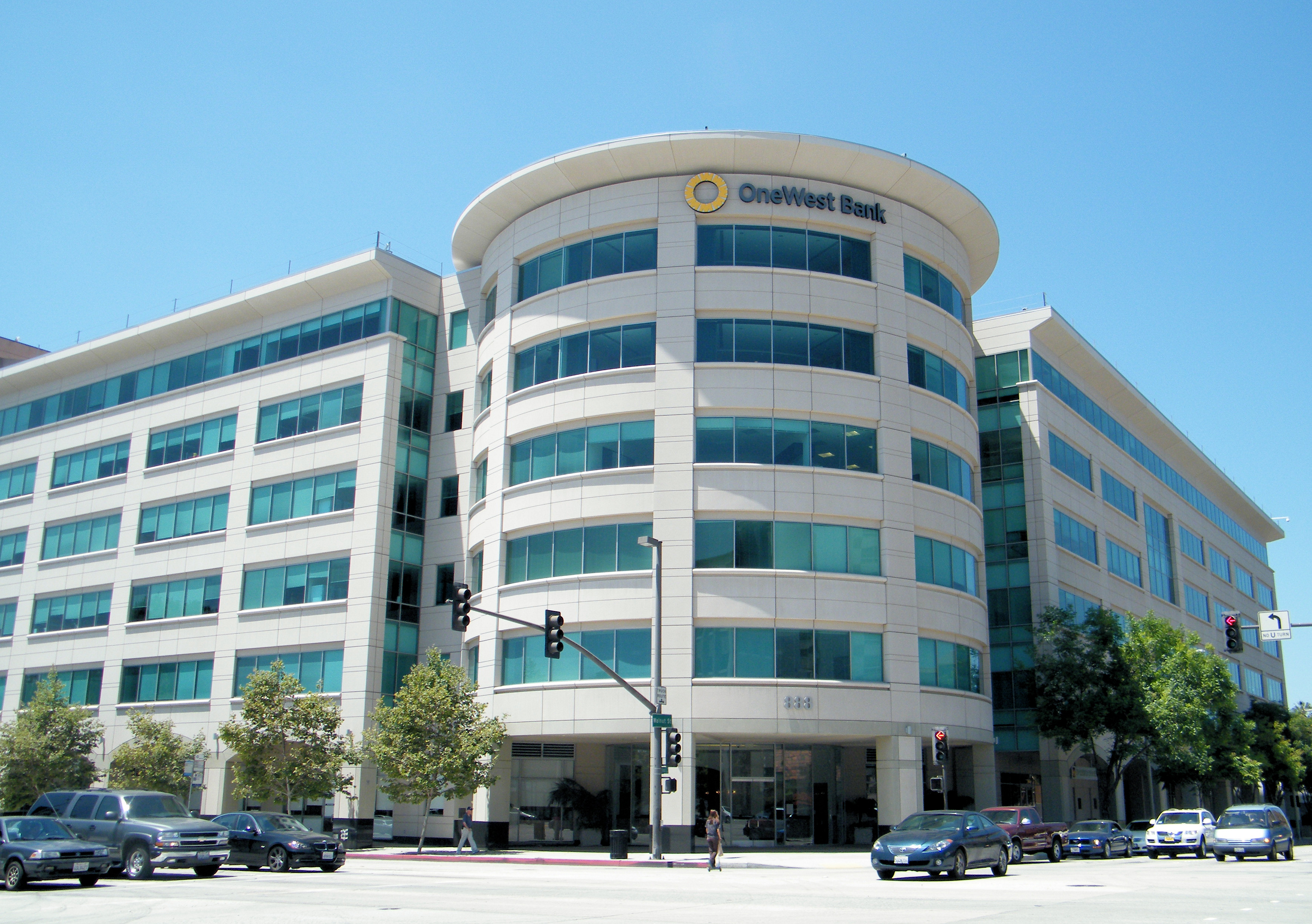
Previous eHarmony headquarters in the OneWest Bank building in downtown Pasadena, California

eharmony is an American online dating website launched in 2000. eharmony is based in Los Angeles, California, and owned by ParshipMeet Group, a joint venture of German mass media company ProSiebenSat.1 Media and American private equity firm General Atlantic.

== History ==
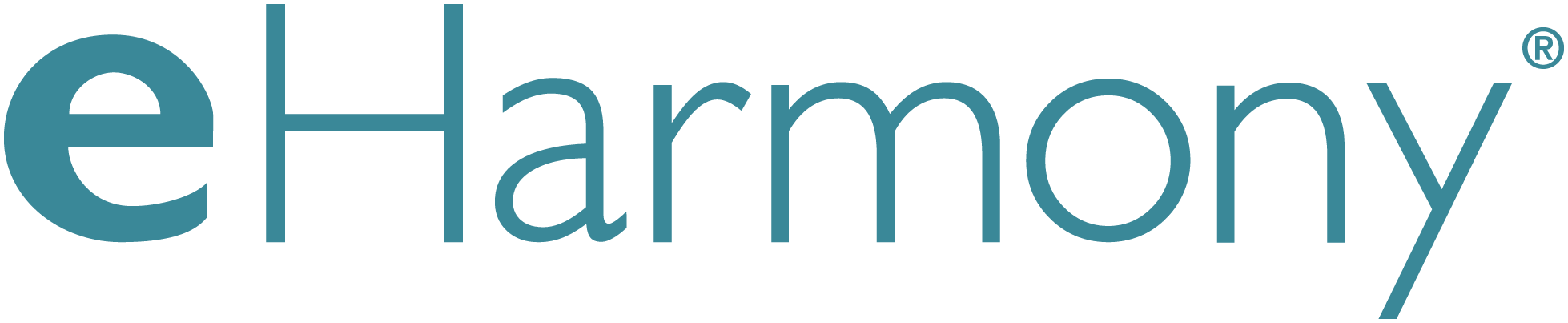
eharmony's original logo, used until August 20, 2017

eharmony logo, used from 2017 to 2023

eharmony was founded by Neil Clark Warren, a clinical psychologist, with his son-in-law, Greg Forgatch. Warren and Forgatch created Neil Clark Warren & Associates, a seminar company, in 1995. The company eventually became the dating website eharmony. During its initial four years, the website was developed by TechEmpower.

The service was financed with a $3 million investment from Fayez Sarofim & Co. and individual investors. eharmony was launched in 2000, making it the first algorithm-based dating site. Between 2000 and 2010, about 33 million members used the service. As of 2008, about 15,000 people were taking the eharmony questionnaire each day. Harris Interactive said in 2010 that after finding a match on eharmony, an average of 542 eharmony members in the United States marry every day.

eharmony has been profitable since 2004. In 2009, eharmony's cumulative revenue exceeded $1.0 billion while their annual revenue was about $250 million. As of 2012, eharmony had 14 percent of the U.S. dating-services market.

In July 2012, Neil Clark Warren came out of retirement to become chief executive officer. Warren closed unprofitable international operations, switched advertisers, made changes to the board, and bought back stock from Sequoia Capital and Technology Crossover Ventures. eharmony featured in the 2013 film The Secret Life of Walter Mitty, where the namesake protagonist speaks to a personal counselor at the company. In 2017, it was reported that eharmony had about 750,000 paid subscribers and 10 million active users, which was about the same as it had been in 2012. Warren left the company again in July 2016.

In 2016, eharmony announced their questionnaire would now be optional for users. By 2017, the questionnaire consisted of 150 questions, down from 450 questions.

In 2018, German mass media company ProSiebenSat.1 Media purchased eharmony via their Nucom ecommerce division (a joint venture of ProSiebenSat and private equity firm General Atlantic).

In 2020, the parent company ParshipMeet Group was formed to manage eharmony, Parship and The Meet Group, after the acquisition of The Meet Group by ProSiebenSat.1 Media.

== Methodology ==
Prospective members complete a proprietary questionnaire about their characteristics, beliefs, values, emotional health and skills. Matching algorithms, which the company believes match people's core traits and values to replicate the traits of happy couples, use these answers to match members with users the company believes will be compatible. The software technology also evaluates users' behavioral data such as average time spent on the site.

Buckwalter says that the compatibility system rests a lot on commonality, for their belief is that "Opposites attract, then they attack."

Starting in January 2017, eharmony users could see why they are considered compatible with a feature called "The Two Of You Together". They will be able to see the matches who score at an advanced level of compatibility and also why.

== Reception and analysis ==
=== Applicant rejection ===
It is estimated that about 20% of eharmony applicants are rejected. In 2007, eharmony stated since the site's launch, they had rejected about a million people who applied to use the service. They reported that about 30% of those applicants were denied because they were already married, 27% were younger than the minimum application age of 21, and 9% provided inconsistent answers on the application. eharmony also stated they reject anyone under the age of 60 who has been married more than four times, or who fails their "dysthymia scale", testing as having a depressed disposition.

=== Same-sex couples ===
When it began, eharmony did not offer same-sex matches; however from 2009 through 2019 the company provided service through a separate platform, Compatible Partners. Warren said that he had done extensive research on heterosexual marriage but did not know enough about homosexual relationships to do same-sex match-making, which he said "calls for some very careful thinking. Very careful research." He also said that eharmony promotes heterosexual marriage, adding that (at the time) same-sex marriage was illegal in most places, saying "We don't really want to participate in something that's illegal." In another interview, Warren went into more detail on his own views, noting that "cities like San Francisco, Chicago or New York... they could shut [eharmony] down so fast. We don't want to make enemies out of them. But at the same time, I take a real strong stand against same-sex marriage, anywhere that I can comment on it."

eharmony's lack of same-sex matching options prompted lawsuits claiming that eHarmony violated laws prohibiting discrimination on the basis of sexual orientation. As part of the settlement of a New Jersey case, eharmony launched a partner website called Compatible Partners providing match-making "for men and women looking for a serious same-sex relationship". Theodore B. Olson, an attorney for eharmony, said that even though the company believed the complaint was "an unfair characterization of our business", it chose to settle because of the unpredictable nature of litigation. In 2010, eHarmony settled a separate class-action lawsuit filed in California that alleged illegal discrimination based on sexual orientation. The company agreed to allow access to both its gay and straight dating sites with a single subscription, to display its gay dating services more prominently and to establish a settlement fund to pay people who can show they were harmed by the company's policies.

As of 2013, about 200,000 people had registered with Compatible Partners. Michelle Garcia, writing in the LGBT-interest magazine The Advocate, also said that, like eharmony, Compatible Partners attracts high-quality customers. According to Garcia, "Because of the price tag and the emphasis on long-term relationships... Compatible Partners' users are seen as quite desirable."

In 2021, eharmony released an advertisement that included a same-sex couple, emphasizing the platform's diverse user base. Certain conservative groups expressed criticism that the platform deviated from its Christian roots.

=== Matching paying members with non-paying members ===
After approval by the questionnaire, eharmony begins to match members regardless of their subscription status. A member's list of matches does not indicate which members are paying or non-paying, so users may not be able to communicate with all of their matches.

=== Explaining success ===
A 2010 article published by the Harvard Business Review attributed the success of eharmony's system to their large membership base, their efforts to exclude people who are not serious about dating, and their membership fees being more expensive than the fees for other dating websites. The author hypothesizes that, since eharmony's questionnaire and high cost of membership deter people who are interested in casual dating, eharmony's members are more likely to be interested in a long-term relationship.

=== Criticism over claims ===
A 2012 analysis of dating websites by Scientific American stated that eharmony, along with other algorithm-based dating sites, had not yet provided members of the scientific community with information about their matching algorithm which could be used to vet their claims about their algorithms being scientifically based.

In 2014, eharmony was criticized by the National Advertising Division of the Better Business Bureau over claims the company had made about their rates of success. This occurred after Match.com challenged claims made by eharmony about the two companies' relative success.

In 2018, the Advertising Standards Authority stated that an eharmony ad which included the lines, "It's time science had a go at love", and "Imagine being able to stack the odds of finding lasting love entirely in your favor", was misleading. When the ASA asked for evidence supporting eharmony's claims that their scientifically proven matching system increases the odds of finding love, eharmony was not able to provide any. The ASA subsequently banned advertisements that claimed the use of a scientifically proven matching system. eharmony publicly disagreed with the ASA but said it would work with them to clarify its advertising.

=== Complaints over subscription practices ===
In September 2023, the Australian Competition & Consumer Commission (ACCC) launched court action against eharmony over allegations of misleading content and hundreds of customer complaints about the company's auto-subscription practices. Customers who have signed up to the service have had their accounts debited without their consent as part of a default auto-renewable subscription that is difficult to cancel. The ACCC referred to this as a "subscription trap" that it alleges has been in place since at least 2019.

== See also ==
- Comparison of online dating websites
