= Neil Clark Warren =

American clinical psychologist

- Born: Neil Clark Warren; Des Moines, Iowa, U.S.
- Education: Pepperdine University (B.A., 1956); Princeton Theological Seminary (M.Div., 1959); University of Chicago (Ph.D., 1967)
- Occupations: Clinical psychologist; seminary professor; Christian theologian
- Years active: 1956–present
- Spouse: Marylyn Warren (m. 1959)
- Children: 3
- Website: eHarmony

Neil Clark Warren is an American clinical psychologist, Christian theologian, seminary professor and co-founder of the online relationship sites eHarmony and Compatible Partners.

In 1995, Warren and his son-in-law, Greg Forgatch, created Neil Clark Warren & Associates, a company which offers seminars and teaching tools based on Warren's books. In early 2000, they established eHarmony, an online compatibility matching service which gained two million users in its first three years. After retiring in 2007, Warren came out of retirement in July 2012, returning as the chief executive of eHarmony.

== Early life and education ==
Born and raised near Des Moines, Iowa, Warren developed an interest in compatibility when young. Although his parents' marriage lasted seventy years, Warren was frustrated by their inability to communicate with each other: "They had a nice marriage, but they were not a very well-matched couple. ... My dad was just so stinking bright, and my mom was so sweet, but she was two standard deviations below him in intelligence," Warren said. When his father ran for office in Polk County, Warren's mother refused to vote because she didn't think one should meddle in politics.

Warren received his undergraduate degree at Pepperdine University in 1956. He got his master's in divinity at Princeton Theological Seminary in 1959. Warren received his Ph.D. in clinical psychology from the University of Chicago in 1967.

== Career ==
=== Psychologist ===
Warren is a former dean and psychologist at the Graduate School of Psychology at Fuller Theological Seminary. During these years, he worked in private practice as a clinical psychologist. In 35 years of therapy, Warren focused on marriage compatibility and performed many "divorce autopsies". In the process, Warren developed an interest in helping singles find lasting relationships.

=== Author and businessman ===
Warren has written about individuals finding the right marriage partner. He published his first pamphlet in 1975 entitled Selecting a Marriage Partner. By 2013, Warren had written ten books, including Learning to Live with the Love of Your Life, Love the Life you Live: 3 Secrets to Feeling Good—Deep Down in Your Soul, and Date or Soul Mate?: How to Know If Someone Is Worth Pursuing in Two Dates or Less.

In 1995, Warren and his son-in-law Greg Forgatch established Neil Clark Warren & Associates, a company offering seminars and teaching tools based on Warren's book Finding the Love of Your Life (published in 1993). Building upon his writing on building strong marriages (including his book, Finding the Love of Your Life), Warren and Forgatch started eHarmony in 2000 as a web-based method of matching singles for marriage based on what are termed "29 dimensions of compatibility".

Warren was chairman of the board of directors at eHarmony from its beginning. In 2007, he entered retirement to live in Kennebunkport, Maine, with his wife Marylyn. Warren then returned to eHarmony as CEO in 2012. "I think we could have had a very good business forever matching people for marriage," Warren said in 2012 in an interview with the Los Angeles Times. "But our sense was, we could do a lot more than that."

== Opinions ==
Warren's religious views strongly influence his work, though these views have at times come into conflict with his desire to expand his business. He has stated: "I think there is something very incredible about Jesus. I don't back away from that. At the same time ... the public we want to serve is the world."

Warren's religious views were a reason for eHarmony's lacking same-sex matches. In 2004, Warren explained his position by commenting: "cities like San Francisco, Chicago or New York ... they could shut [eHarmony] down so fast. We don't want to make enemies out of them. But at the same time, I take a real strong stand against same-sex marriage, anywhere that I can comment on it."

Much of eHarmony's initial success was explained by Warren by its promotion on the daily radio broadcast of Focus on the Family. As the company expanded and sought broader market share, Warren parted ways with Focus on the Family and its founder, James Dobson. In 2005, Warren discontinued his appearances on Dobson's radio show and bought back rights to three of his books—Finding the Love of Your Life, Make Anger Your Ally, and Learning to Live with the Love of Your Life—originally published by Focus on the Family. As Warren explained, "We're trying to reach the whole world—people of all spiritual orientations, all political philosophies, all racial backgrounds."

== Publications ==
- God Said It, Don't Sweat It ISBN 978-0-7852-8064-4
- Finding Contentment ISBN 978-0-7852-7234-2
- Finding the Love of Your Life ISBN 978-0-671-89201-2
- Catching the Rhythm of Love ISBN 978-0-7852-7344-8
- Make Anger Your Ally ISBN 1-56179-707-3
- Falling in Love for All the Right Reasons
- How to Know if Someone is Worth Pursuing in Two Dates or Less
- Love the Life you Live
- “‘Date or Soulmate’” (ISBN 078528303X)

== See also ==
- Helen Fisher
- Pepper Schwartz
