= Nigel =

Male given name

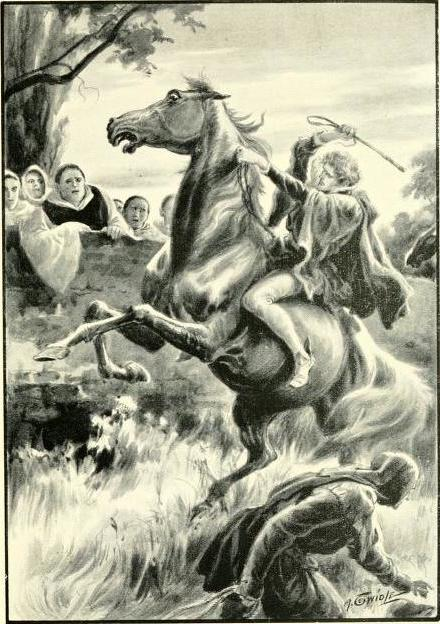
- Illustration from the book Sir Nigel
- Gender: Male

Origin
- Origin: Niall -> Njáll -> Neel, Niel, Nihel -> Nigellus -> Nigel
- Meaning: ultimately from the Gaelic Niall
- Region of origin: Normandy and England

Other names
- Related names: Nigella (female)

Nigel (/ˈnaɪdʒəl/ NY-jəl) is an English masculine given name.

The English Nigel is found in records dating from the Middle Ages; however, it was not used much before being revived by 19th-century antiquarians. For instance, Walter Scott published The Fortunes of Nigel in 1822, and Arthur Conan Doyle published Sir Nigel in 1905–06. As a name given for boys in England and Wales, it peaked in popularity from the 1950s to the 1970s (see below).

Nigel has never been as common in other countries as it is in Britain, but was among the 1,000 most common names for boys born in the United States from 1971 to 2010. Numbers peaked in 1994 when 447 were recorded (it was the 478th most common boys' name that year). The peak popularity at 0.02% of boys' names in 1994 compares to a peak popularity in England and Wales of about 1.2% in 1963, 60 times higher.

== Etymology ==
The name is derived from the church Latin Nigellus. This word was at first assumed to be derived from the classical Latin nigellus (meaning dark). However, this is now considered an example of an incorrect etymology passed down and created by French-speaking clerics, who knew Latin as well and translated the Norman first name Neel to Latin written documents, as was conventional in Western Europe at the time. The Latin word nigellus gave birth to Old French neel (modern nielle), meaning "niello, black enamel"; and this explains the confusion with Nigel, because the clerics believed it was the same etymology as the first name Neel, spelled the same way.

However Nigel, via medieval Latin Nigellus and subsequently Norman Neel (modern surname Néel), and Norse Njáll, is ultimately derived from the Gaelic Irish given name Niall.

== England and Wales ==
The following table shows the number of boys given the first name Nigel in specific years in England and Wales. Numbers peaked in about 1963. In 1964 it was the 23rd most popular boys' name. By 2016 the number of boys named Nigel had dropped below 3, the minimum number reported by the ONS.

Year	Number
1840	1
1850	2
1860	1
1870	7
1880	8
1890	10
1900	18
1910	24
1920	71
1930	164
1940	445
1950	1,943
1960	4,383
1963	5,529
1970	2,469
1980	413
1990	125
2000	25
2010	18
2015	9

== Medieval figures ==
- Nigel (bishop of Ely) (Néel d'Ely) (c. 1100–1169), Anglo-Norman clergyman, administrator, and bishop
- Nigel d'Aubigny of Cainhoe (?–1090s), Norman knight
- Nigel d'Aubigny (Néel d'Aubigny) (?–1129), Norman nobleman
- Nigel de Longchamps, 12th-century English satirist and poet
- Nigel de Wavere, 14th-century English medieval theologian, churchman, college fellow, and university chancellor
- Nigel D'Oyly (Néel d'Ouilly), 11th- and 12th-century Anglo-Norman lord
- Nigel Fossard (?–after 1120), Anglo-Norman nobleman
- Nigel de Saint-Sauveur (Néel de Saint-Sauveur), Norman baron at Saint-Sauveur-le-Vicomte in Cotentin

== Notable people named Nigel ==
- Nigel Abbott (1920–2011), Australian politician
- Nigel Adams (born 1966), English former politician
- Nigel Ah Wong (born 1990), New Zealand professional rugby union player
- Nigel Albon (born 1957), British racing driver
- Nigel Anderson (1920–2008), Australian-born British soldier, landowner, and politician
- Nigel Andrews (born 1947), English film critic
- Nigel Anstey (born 1927), British geophysicist
- Nigel Ashford (born 1952), British political academic and author
- Nigel Ashurst, New Zealand international footballer
- Nigel Aspinall (born 1946), English croquet player
- Nigel Auchterlounie, British comics artist and cartoonist
- Nigel Avery (born 1967), New Zealand former weightlifter
- Nigel Ayers (born 1957), English multimedia artist
- Nigel Badnell (1958–2024), British physicist
- Nigel Bagnall (1927–2002), British Army officer
- Nigel Baillie, Scottish past member of indie pop band Camera Obscura (band)
- Nigel Baker (born 1966), British diplomat
- Nigel Baker (cricketer) (1914–1968), English cricketer
- Nigel Balchin (1908–1970), English psychologist and author
- Nigel Ball (1892–1978), British professor of botany
- Nigel Barber (born 1955), Irish-born American biopsychologist and author
- Nigel Barker, several people
- Nigel Barley, several people
- Nigel Barr, British musician
- Nigel Barrie (1889–1971), Indian-born British actor
- Nigel Batch (born 1957), English former footballer
- Nigel Beard (1936–2017), British politician
- Nigel Beaumont (born 1967), English former professional footballer
- Nigel Bell (born 1962), English former professional rugby league footballer
- Nigel Benn (born 1964), English former professional boxer
- Nigel Bennett (born 1949), English-born Canadian actor, director, and writer
- Nigel Benson (born 1955), British writer and illustrator
- Nigel Berlyn (1934–2022), English-born senior Royal Australian Navy officer
- Nigel Bertrams (born 1993), Dutch former professional footballer
- Nigel Betts, English actor
- Nigel Bevan (born 1968), English javelin thrower
- Nigel Bezani, Welsh retired rugby union player
- Nigel Bishop (born 1976), Grenadian former footballer
- Nigel Blackwell, English lead singer and guitarist of rock band Half Man Half Biscuit
- Nigel Bloy (1923–1989), English cricketer and Royal Air Force officer
- Nigel Boddice (1952–2022), English trumpeter, conductor, and band leader
- Nigel Bolton (born 1975), English former footballer
- Nigel Bond (born 1965), English retired professional snooker player
- Nigel Bonner (1928–1994), British zoologist, Antarctic marine mammal specialist, author, and ecologist
- Nigel Bonyongwe (born 1994), Zimbabwean cricketer
- Nigel Boocock (1937–2015), English-born Australian motorcycle speedway rider
- Nigel Boogaard (born 1986), Australian former professional footballer
- Nigel Borell (born 1973), New Zealand Māori artist, museum curator, and Māori art advocate
- Nigel Boston (1961–2024), British-American mathematician
- Nigel Boulton (born 1953), Welsh-born retired footballer and current American soccer coach
- Nigel Bowen (1911–1994), Australian lawyer, politician, and judge
- Nigel Bowen, New Zealand mayor
- Nigel Bradham (born 1989), American former NFL player
- Nigel Bradshaw (born 1951), British-born Australian actor
- Nigel Brady (born 1979), Irish former rugby union footballer
- Nigel Braun, real name of NileRed (born 1991), Canadian YouTuber
- Nigel Brennan (born 1972), Australian photojournalist and author
- Nigel Bridge, Baron Bridge of Harwich (1917–2007), British judge
- Nigel Briers (born 1955), English former cricketer
- Nigel Broackes (1934–1999), English businessman
- Nigel Brookes (born 1967), Australian former cricketer
- Nigel Brooks (1926–2024), English composer, arranger, and conductor
- Nigel Broomfield (1937–2018), British diplomat
- Nigel Brothers, Australian author and biologist
- Nigel Brouwers (1976–2021), South African cricketer
- Nigel Brown (born 1949), New Zealand painter
- Nigel Brown, British chairman
- Nigel Bruce (1895–1953), English stage-and screen character actor
- Nigel Bruce (journalist) (born 1942), South African journalist and politician
- Nigel Buesst (1938–2024), Australian filmmaker
- Nigel Burch (born 1954), English songwriter, musician, poet, and graphic artist
- Nigel Burgess, several people
- Nigel Burton (born 1976), American football commentator and former head coach
- Nigel Butterley (1935–2022), Australian composer and pianist
- Nigel Buxton (1924–2015), British travel writer and wine critic
- Nigel Cabourn (born 1949), English fashion designer
- Nigel Calder (1931–2014), English science writer and climate change skeptic
- Nigel Callaghan (born 1962), Singaporean-born English former professional footballer
- Nigel Capel-Cure (1908–2004), English cricketer
- Nigel Carolan (born 1974), Irish rugby union coach
- Nigel Carr (born 1959), Northern Irish former rugby union international player
- Nigel Carr (American football) (born 1990), American former football player
- Nigel Carrington, British lawyer and academic leader
- Nigel Carter (born 1945), English environmentalist and politician
- Nigel Casey (born 1969), British diplomat
- Nigel Cassidy (1945–2008), English footballer
- Nigel Cawthorne (born 1951), English freelance writer and editor
- Nigel Cayzer (born 1954), British businessman and chairman
- Nigel Channing, American host of Journey into Imagination with Figment
- Nigel Chapman, several people
- Nigel Clarke, several people
- Nigel Cleere (born 1955), English ornithologist
- Nigel Cliff (born 1969), British biographer, historian, translator, and critic
- Nigel Clifford (born 1959), British businessman and academic administrator
- Nigel Clough (born 1966), English professional football manager and former player
- Nigel Cluer (born 1953), Australian former swimmer
- Nigel Clutton (born 1954), English former footballer
- Nigel Coan, British animator, director, and writer
- Nigel Coates, several people
- Nigel Cochrane (born 1961), Canadian sailor
- Nigel Cock (born 1946), English former cricketer
- Nigel Cockburn (?–1957), South African tennis player
- Nigel Codrington (born 1979), Guyanese former footballer
- Nigel Colborn, English TV presenter and gardening expert/writer
- Nigel Cole (born 1959), English film- and television director
- Nigel Collett (born 1952), British former army lieutenant-colonel and author
- Nigel Collins, several people
- Nigel Colman, several people
- Nigel Connell, Irish contestant on The Voice of Ireland series 5
- Nigel Connor (born 1970), Anguillian football manager
- Nigel Cook (born 1954), English former cricketer
- Nigel Cooke (born 1973), British painter
- Nigel Corbet Fletcher (1877–1951), English international rugby union player
- Nigel Cornwall (1903–1984), English Anglican clergyman
- Nigel Costello (born 1968), English former professional footballer
- Nigel Coultas, British Paralympic high jumper
- Nigel Cowie, British banker
- Nigel Cowley (born 1953), English former cricketer
- Nigel Cox, several people
- Nigel Crabtree (born 1960), English former motorcycle speedway rider
- Nigel Crawford (born 1979), Irish Gaelic footballer
- Nigel Crisp, Baron Crisp (born 1952), British crossbench life peer
- Nigel Cross (born 1942), British academic, design researcher, educator, and emeritus professor of design studies
- Nigel Crouch (born 1958), English former professional footballer
- Nigel Cullen (1917–1941), Australian fighter ace of World War II
- Nigel Cutland, British professor of mathematics
- Nigel D. Oram (1919–2003), English-born Australian public servant, academic, ethnologist, and anthropologist
- Nigel Dakin (born 1964), British soldier, diplomat, and former Governor of the Turks and Caicos Islands
- Nigel Davenport (1928–2013), English stage-, television-, and film actor
- Nigel David Ward (1943–2024), Canadian-born British Royal Navy officer
- Nigel Davies, several people
- Nigel Davis (born 1951), Welsh former judge
- Nigel De'ath (born 1965), English former speedway rider
- Nigel Debenham, New Zealand former association footballer
- Nigel De Brulier (1877–1948), English stage- and film actor
- Nigel de Freitas (born 1979), Trinidadian politician
- Nigel de Grey (1886–1951), British codebreaker
- Nigel de Gruchy (born 1943), British former trade union official
- Nigel de Jong (born 1984), Dutch former professional footballer
- Nigel Dempster (1941–2007), Indian-born Scottish-English journalist
- Nigel Dennis (1912–1989), English writer, critic, playwright, and magazine editor
- Nigel Dick (born 1953), English director, writer, and musician
- Nigel Dineen, Irish politician and former Gaelic football manager and player
- Nigel Dobbs (born 1962), English former cricketer
- Nigel Dodd (1965–2022), British sociologist
- Nigel Dodds (born 1958), Northern Irish politician and barrister
- Nigel Don (born 1954), Scottish composer, arranger, and former politician
- Nigel Donn (born 1962), English former professional footballer
- Nigel Donnelly (born 1968), New Zealand cyclist
- Nigel Donohue (born 1969), British retired judoka and wrestler
- Nigel Dorward (born 1966), Zimbabwean cricketer
- Nigel Doughty (1957–2012), English investor and football club owner
- Nigel Douglas (tenor) (1929–2023), English operatic tenor
- Nigel Downer, Canadian actor and comedian
- Nigel Drury (1911–1984), Australian politician; grandson of Colonel Edward Robert Drury
- Nigel E. Stork, Australian entomologist and professor emeritus
- Nigel Eaton, English multi-instrumentalist and composer
- Nigel Eccles, technology entrepreneur
- Nigel Edward Farmer, English criminal
- Nigel Edwards, several people
- Nigel Egg (born 1949), British blues rock singer-songwriter
- Nigel Ellis (born 1997), Jamaican sprinter
- Nigel Ellsay (born 1994), Canadian former professional cyclist
- Nigel Emslie, Lord Emslie (born 1947), Scottish retired judge
- Nigel Essenhigh (born 1944), English former Royal Navy officer
- Nigel Evans (born 1957), Welsh former politician
- Nigel F. Palmer (1946–2022), British Germanist and professor emeritus
- Nigel Fairs, English actor and writer
- Nigel Farage (born 1964), English politician and broadcaster
- Nigel Farndale (born 1964), British author and journalist
- Nigel Farrell (1953–2011), English television documentary filmmaker
- Nigel Farrow (born 1963), English former cricketer
- Nigel Felton (born 1960), English former cricketer
- Nigel Fenton (born 1965), English former cricketer
- Nigel Fiegert (born 1976), Australian former AFL player
- Nigel Finch (1949–1995), English film director and filmmaker
- Nigel Findley (1959–1995), Canadian game designer, editor, and author of novels and role-playing games
- Nigel Fisher (1913–1996), Welsh politician
- Nigel Fisher (United Nations), Canadian crisis management and response official
- Nigel Flatman (born 1960), English former motorcycle speedway rider
- Nigel Fleming (born 1951), Zimbabwean former cricket umpire
- Nigel Forbes, 22nd Lord Forbes (1918–2013), Scottish soldier, businessman, and politician
- Nigel Forman (1943–2017), Indian-born British politician
- Nigel Fortune (1924–2009), English musicologist and political activist
- Nigel Foster, several people
- Nigel Foulkes (1919–2013), British businessman, managing director, and chairman
- Nigel Fountain (born 1944), British writer, journalist, editor, and broadcaster
- Nigel Francis (born 1971), Trinidadian cricketer
- Nigel Freminot, Seychellois footballer
- Nigel Frieda (born 1952), British record producer
- Nigel Fyfe, New Zealand ambassador to Spain
- Nigel G. Stocks (born 1964), English engineer and physicist
- Nigel Gadsby (born 1961), English former cricketer
- Nigel Gaffey (born 1970), Australian former rugby league footballer
- Nigel Gardner (1933–2016), British alpine skier
- Nigel Gavin, New Zealand musician and composer
- Nigel Gibbens (born 1958), British veterinarian and civil servant
- Nigel Gibbs (born 1965), English professional football manager and former player
- Nigel Gibbs (1922–2014), English international rugby union player
- Nigel Gibson, British activist, scholar, and author
- Nigel Gilbert (born 1950), British sociologist
- Nigel Gilbert (born 1959), English former professional snooker player
- Nigel Gleghorn (born 1962), English former professional footballer
- Nigel Glendinning (1929–2013), British scholar and authority of Spanish literature
- Nigel Glockler (born 1953), English drummer of heavy metal band Saxon
- Nigel Glover (born 1961), British particle physicist
- Nigel Godfrey (born 1951), British Anglican priest
- Nigel Godrich (born 1971), English recording engineer, record producer, and musician
- Nigel Goldenfeld (born 1957), American professor of physics
- Nigel Goring-Morris, British-born Israeli archaeologist and professor
- Nigel Gosling (1909–1982), British art- and dance critic and author
- Nigel Grainge (1946–2017), English-born American music executive; founder of Ensign Records
- Nigel Gray (1947–2016), English record producer
- Nigel Gray (author) (born 1941), Northern Irish-born Australian author
- Nigel Gray (footballer) (born 1956), English former professional footballer
- Nigel Greaves (born c. 1960), English actor
- Nigel Green (1924–1972), English actor
- Nigel Greenwood, several people
- Nigel Gresley (1876–1941), Scottish-born English steam locomotive engineer, and British Army officer during World War II
- Nigel Griffiths (born 1955), Scottish politician
- Nigel Griggs (born 1949), English musician
- Nigel Grindley (born 1945), British biochemist and professor of molecular biophysics and biochemistry
- Nigel Groom (1924–2014), British Arabist, historian, author, soldier, counter-espionage officer, and perfume expert
- Nigel Guild (born 1949), South African-born British former Royal Navy officer
- Nigel Hackett (born 1962), English former cricketer
- Nigel Hadgkiss, British-born Australian police officer and public servant
- Nigel Haig (1887–1966), English cricketer
- Nigel Hall, several people
- Nigel Hallett (born 1953), Australian politician
- Nigel Hamer, British-born Canadian terrorist, kidnapper, and schoolteacher
- Nigel Hamilton, several people
- Nigel Hankin (1920–2007), English-born Indian lexicographer
- Nigel Harman (born 1973), English actor
- Nigel Harper (born 1948), English former cricketer
- Nigel Harris, several people
- Nigel Harrison (born 1951), English musician
- Nigel Harrison (cricketer) (1878–1947), English cricketer
- Nigel Hart (born 1958), English former footballer
- Nigel Harte, Westmeath Gaelic footballer
- Nigel Harvie Bennett (1912–2008), English cricketer
- Nigel Hasselbaink (born 1990), Dutch-born Surinamese professional footballer
- Nigel Hastilow (born 1956), English journalist, author, businessman, and politician
- Nigel Havers (born 1951), English actor and presenter
- Nigel Haworth (born 1951), New Zealand economics academic and politician
- Nigel Hawthorne (1929–2001), English actor
- Nigel Hayes-Davis (born 1994), American professional basketball player
- Nigel Haywood (born 1955), English diplomat, and former Governor of the Falkland Islands
- Nigel Healey (born 1957), British-New Zealand academic, economist, and professor
- Nigel Heath (born 1955), English ex-rally driver
- Nigel Hemming (born 1957), British artist
- Nigel Hemming (born 1969), British Christian songwriter and musician
- Nigel Henbest (born 1951), British astronomer and science communicator
- Nigel Henderson (1909–1993), British Royal Navy officer
- Nigel Henderson (artist) (1917–1985), English documentary artist and photographer
- Nigel Henry (born 1976), Trinidadian retired soccer player
- Nigel Herring (1877–1972), Australian Anglican priest
- Nigel Heseltine (1916–1995), English author of travel books, short stories, plays, and poetry; and an FAO agronomist of the United Nations
- Nigel Heslop (born 1963), English former rugby union- and professional rugby league footballer
- Nigel Hess (born 1953), English composer
- Nigel Heydon (born 1970), English professional darts player
- Nigel Higgins (born 1980), Irish hurler
- Nigel Higson (born 1963), Canadian math professor
- Nigel Hinton (born 1941), English novelist
- Nigel Hitchcock (born 1971), English jazz saxophonist
- Nigel Hitchin (born 1946), English mathematician and professor emeritus of mathematics
- Nigel Hollis (born 1958), American author, analyst, researcher, speaker, and commentator on marketing
- Nigel Holmes (born 1942), British/American graphic designer, author, and theorist
- Nigel Holt (born 1961), Australian former rugby union international player
- Nigel Horspool, British-born Canadian professor of computer science; inventor of the Boyer–Moore–Horspool algorithm
- Nigel Horton (born 1948), English former international rugby union player
- Nigel Howard (1925–1979), English cricketer
- Nigel Howard Croft (born 1956), British authority on quality management and conformity assessment
- Nigel Howe (born 1958), English property developer, former CEO, and current property projects manager
- Nigel Huddleston (born 1970), British politician
- Nigel Humberstone, English member of neoclassical dark wave- and martial industrial band In the Nursery
- Nigel Humphreys (born 1950), British actor
- Nigel Hunt (born 1983), Samoan-born New Zealand rugby union player
- Nigel Hutchinson (1941–2017), English-born New Zealand film producer and commercial director
- Nigel Hutton, Australian politician
- Nigel Iggo, New Zealand international field hockey umpire
- Nigel Illingworth (born 1960), English former cricketer
- Nigel Ilott (born 1965), English former cricketer
- Nigel Inkster (born 1956), British former intelligence operative
- Nigel Ipinson (born 1970), English keyboardist
- Nigel Irens, English yacht designer
- Nigel Isaacs (born 1971), Canadian former cricketer
- Nigel J. Ashton, English historian and professor of international history
- Nigel Jaquiss (born 1962), American journalist
- Nigel Jemson (born 1969), English footballer
- Nigel Jenkins (1949–2014), Anglo-Welsh poet
- Nigel Jerram (1900–1968), English cricketer, medical doctor, and Royal Air Force officer
- Nigel Johnson, several people
- Nigel John Taylor (born 1960), English bass player of pop rock band Duran Duran
- Nigel Jones, several people
- Nigel Justice (born 1956), English former professional darts player
- Nigel Kalton (1946–2010), British-American mathematician
- Nigel Kassulke (born 1961), Australian former rugby union international player
- Nigel Keay (born 1955), New Zealand violist and composer
- Nigel Kellett (born 1969), Australian former AFL player
- Nigel Kennedy (born 1956), English violinist and violist
- Nigel Kennedy (cricketer) (born 1964), Jamaican cricketer
- Nigel Kennedy (politician) (1889–1964), British barrister, army officer, and politician
- Nigel Kingscote (1830–1908), English soldier, politician, courtier, and agriculturalist
- Nigel Kitching (born 1959), British comic book writer and artist
- Nigel Kneale (1922–2006), British scriptwriter and author
- Nigel Knight (born 1956), British economist, author, and political scientist
- Nigel Knowles, English former solicitor
- Nigel Kol (born 1962), Australian former VFL player
- Nigel Konstam (1932–2022), British sculptor and art historian
- Nigel Krauth (born 1949), Australian novelist and academic
- Nigel Kyeremateng (born 2000), Italian professional footballer
- Nigel Lamb (born 1956), English aerobatics pilot
- Nigel Lambert (1944–2024), English voice actor
- Nigel Lappin (born 1976), Australian former AFL player
- Nigel Latta (born 1967), New Zealand clinical psychologist, author, and broadcaster
- Nigel Laughton (born 1965), English sports consultant, former cricketer, and former British Army officer
- Nigel Lawson (1932–2023), English politician and journalist; Chancellor of the Exchequer
- Nigel Leakey (1913–1941), British soldier and recipient of the Victoria Cross
- Nigel Leask (born 1958), Scottish academic
- Nigel Leathern (1932–2012), South African cricketer
- Nigel Le Vaillant (born 1958), British former actor
- Nigel Levine (born 1989), English retired sprint track and field athlete
- Nigel Levings, Australian stage lighting designer
- Nigel Lindsay (born 1969), English actor
- Nigel Linge, British professor of telecommunications
- Nigel Llong (born 1969), English cricket umpire and former cricketer
- Nigel Lloyd (born 1961), Barbadian-British basketball coach and former player
- Nigel Lockyer (born 1952), Scottish-American experimental particle physicist
- Nigel Lonwijk (born 2002), Dutch professional footballer
- Nigel Loring, several people
- Nigel Love (1892–1979), Australian aviator and flour miller
- Nigel Lovell (1916–2001), Australian actor, producer, and director
- Nigel Lythgoe (born 1949), English television- and film director and producer, television dance competition judge, former dancer, and choreographer
- Nigel MacArthur, English freelance broadcaster
- Nigel MacEwan (1933–2019), American investment banker
- Nigel Maddox, British retired senior Royal Air Force officer
- Nigel Maister, American theater director and writer
- Nigel Malim (1919–2006), British Royal Navy officer during World War II
- Nigel Mansell (born 1953), English former racing car driver
- Nigel Marples (born 1985), Canadian football player and coach
- Nigel Martin, British politician and mathematician
- Nigel Martyn (born 1966), English football coach and former professional player
- Nigel Marven (born 1960), English wildlife television presenter/producer, author, and hobby ornithologist
- Nigel Maynard (1921–1998), British Royal Air Force commander
- Nigel McBride, South Australian lawyer and businessman
- Nigel McClintock, Northern Irish organist, choral conductor, and teacher
- Nigel McCrery (1953–2025), English screenwriter, producer, and writer
- Nigel McCulloch (born 1942), British Anglican cleric
- Nigel McGuinness (born 1976), English professional wrestler and commentator
- Nigel McKenzie, pen name of Kathleen Lindsay (1903–1973), English writer of historical romance novels
- Nigel McLoughlin (born 1968), Northern Irish poet, editor, and teacher
- Nigel McNair Scott (1945–2023), British businessperson
- Nigel Meek (born 1964), Welsh retired international rugby union player
- Nigel Melker (born 1991), Dutch former racing driver
- Nigel Melville (born 1961), English former rugby player, and current coach and administrator
- Nigel Merrett (born 1940), British zoologist, ichthyologist, and former museum director
- Nigel Miguel (born 1963), Belizean-American actor, film producer, film commissioner, and former CBA player
- Nigel Mills (born 1974), British politician and former chartered accountant
- Nigel Mills (RAF officer) (1932–1991), British military doctor
- Nigel Milsom (born 1975), Australian painter
- Nigel Mobbs (1937–2005), English businessman and knight
- Nigel Mooney (born 1963), Irish blues- and jazz singer, guitarist, and songwriter
- Nigel Moore, several people
- Nigel Morgan (1954–2018), Irish-born South African security consultant
- Nigel Morris (born 1958), English-born American billionaire businessman; co-founder of Capital One
- Nigel Morrison (born 1955), Vanuatuan cricket umpire
- Nigel Morritt Wace (1929–2005), Indian-born Australian Royal Marines officer, botanist, and academic
- Nigel Murch (1944–2020), Australian cricketer
- Nigel Murray (born 1964), British Paralympic athlete
- Nigel Napier-Andrews (born 1942), British/Canadian TV producer, director, and author
- Nigel Neill (1947–2026), New Zealand actor
- Nigel Nestor (born 1974), Irish former sportsperson
- Nigel Ng (born 1991), Malaysian stand-up comedian and YouTuber
- Nigel Nicholson, British business psychologist and emeritus professor of behavior
- Nigel Nicolson (1917–2004), English writer, publisher, and politician
- Nigel Noble (born 1943), English sound mixer, film director, and producer
- Nigel Norman (1897–1943), English consulting civil engineer and Royal Air Force officer
- Nigel North (born 1954), English lutenist, musicologist, and pedagogue
- Nigel Northridge (born 1956), British businessman
- Nigel Oakes (born 1962), British businessman
- Nigel Odell, Australian film producer
- Nigel Ogden (born 1954), English theatre organist
- Nigel Ogden, English flight attendant
- Nigel Olsson (born 1949), English drummer for Elton John Band, solo recording artist
- Nigel Osborne (born 1948), English composer, teacher, and aid worker
- Nigel Owens (born 1971), Welsh former international rugby union referee
- Nigel Owusu (born 2003), Dutch footballer
- Nigel P. Bannister, British astronomer
- Nigel Palfreyman (born 1973), Australian former AFL player
- Nigel Paneth (born 1946), English pediatrician, epidemiologist, and professor
- Nigel Park (1921–1942), New Zealand fighter pilot and flying ace of World War II
- Nigel Parkinson (born 1952), British cartoonist and humorist
- Nigel Parry (born 1961), American photographer of celebrities
- Nigel Parsons, Australian Paralympic athlete
- Nigel Paterson (producer), British television writer, director, and producer
- Nigel Paterson (musician), British musician
- Nigel Patmore (born 1960), Australian former field hockey player
- Nigel Patrick (1912–1981), English actor and stage director
- Nigel Paul, several people
- Nigel Paulet, 18th Marquess of Winchester (1941–2016), South African-born British peer and premier marquess of England
- Nigel Payne (born 1960), British business executive
- Nigel Peake (born 1981), Irish architect
- Nigel Pearson (born 1963), English football manager and former professional player
- Nigel Peel (1967–2016), English cricketer
- Nigel Pegram (born 1940), South African-born British actor
- Nigel Pegrum (born 1949), English music producer and former drummer
- Nigel Pengelly (1925–2010), Canadian politician
- Nigel Pepper (born 1968), English retired professional footballer
- Nigel Peters (born 1952), British Circuit Judge
- Nigel Peyton (born 1951), British retired Anglican bishop
- Nigel Phelps (born 1962), English production designer, set designer, and conceptual illustrator
- Nigel Phillips (born 1963), British diplomat, former Royal Air Force officer, former Governor of the Falkland Islands, and Commissioner of the South Georgia- and the South Sandwich Islands
- Nigel Pickard, British television executive
- Nigel Pickering (1929–2011), American folk rock musician
- Nigel Pierre (born 1979), Trinidad and Tobago footballer
- Nigel Pilkington, English actor, singer, and screenwriter
- Nigel Pivaro (born 1959), English actor and journalist
- Nigel Planer (born 1953), English actor, writer, and musician
- Nigel Plaskitt (born 1950), English actor, puppeteer, producer, and stage- and television director
- Nigel Playfair (1874–1934), English actor and director
- Nigel Plews (1934–2008), English cricket umpire
- Nigel Plum (born 1983), Australian former professional rugby league footballer
- Nigel Poett (1907–1991), British Army officer
- Nigel Poole (born 1965), English High Court judge
- Nigel Poor, American artist, professor of photography, and podcaster
- Nigel Popplewell (born 1957), English solicitor and former cricketer
- Nigel Porter, English politician and councillor
- Nigel Povah (born 1952), British chess player
- Nigel Powell (born 1971), English multi-instrumental musician
- Nigel Press (born 1949), British geologist
- Nigel Preston (1963–1992), English drummer
- Nigel Priestley (1943–2014), New Zealand earthquake engineer
- Nigel Pullman (born 1947), British former Army officer and newspaper executive
- Nigel Pulsford, English past member of rock band Bush (British band)
- Nigel Quashie (born 1978), Scottish footballer
- Nigel Quinlan, Australian founder of Legalise Cannabis Australia
- Nigel Quinn (born 1955), American water resources engineer, earth scientist, and academic
- Nigel R. Franks (born 1956), English emeritus professor of animal behavior and ecology
- Nigel Railton (born 1967), English accountant and business executive
- Nigel Randell Evans (1943–2014), British author, campaigner for people with disabilities, and film maker
- Nigel Ratwatte (born 1990), Sri Lankan rugby union player
- Nigel Read, English retired rower
- Nigel Redman (born 1964), English former professional rugby union player
- Nigel Rees (born 1944), English writer and broadcaster
- Nigel Rees (footballer) (born 1953), Welsh former professional footballer
- Nigel Reo-Coker (born 1984), English former professional footballer
- Nigel Richards, several people
- Nigel Richardson (born 1958), English human rights lawyer and deputy district judge
- Nigel Robertha (born 1998), Dutch professional footballer
- Nigel Roberts, British computer scientist
- Nigel Robertson (born 1962), English entrepreneur and businessman
- Nigel Robinson, English author
- Nigel Roder (born 1967), English comedian
- Nigel Rodgers (born 1952), English writer, environmentalist, and critic
- Nigel Rodley (1941–2017), British international lawyer and professor
- Nigel Roebuck (born 1946), English journalist
- Nigel Rogers (1935–2022), English multilingual tenor, music conductor, and vocal coach
- Nigel Rolfe (born 1950), English-born Irish performance artist and video artist
- Nigel Romick (born 1991), Canadian CFL player
- Nigel Ross, several people
- Nigel Roy (born 1974), Australian former professional rugby league footballer
- Nigel Rudd (born 1946), British chairman of BBA Aviation
- Nigel Russell (1948–2009), Canadian singer/songwriter
- Nigel Rusted (1907–2012), Canadian medical doctor
- Nigel Ryan (1929–2014), English journalist
- Nigel Saddington (1965–2019), English professional footballer
- Nigel Sadler (born 1978), Australian former motorcycle speedway rider
- Nigel Satterley (born 1947), Western Australian businessman
- Nigel Saul (born 1952), British academic and emeritus professor
- Nigel Savage (born 1970), English environmental activist and founder of Jewish organization Hazon
- Nigel Savery, British professor of biology
- Nigel Scott (born 1961), New Zealand former cricketer
- Nigel Scrutton (born 1964), British biochemist and biotechnology innovator
- Nigel Scullion (born 1956), Australian former politician
- Nigel Searle, British former managing director of Sinclair Research Ltd
- Nigel Sears (born 1957), English tennis coach
- Nigel Seely (1923–2019), British baronet
- Nigel Shadbolt (born 1956), English computer scientist
- Nigel Shafran (born 1964), English photographer and artist
- Nigel Sharp (born 1961), Australian conservationist and biodiversity impact investor
- Nigel Sharpe (1904–1962), English tennis player
- Nigel Sheinwald (born 1953), British former senior diplomat
- Nigel Sherlock (born 1940), English retired stockbroker
- Nigel Short (born 1965), English chess grandmaster, columnist, coach, and commentator
- Nigel Short (born 1965/1966), British singer and choral conductor
- Nigel Simmonds, English legal scholar, emeritus professor of jurisprudence, and former dean
- Nigel Simpson (born 1975), English former rugby union player
- Nigel Sims (1931–2018), English footballer
- Nigel Sinclair (born 1948), Scottish film producer
- Nigel Sinker (born 1946), English former cricketer
- Nigel Sitwell (1935–2017), English conservationist, writer, editor, businessman, and explorer
- Nigel Slater (born 1956), English food writer, journalist, and broadcaster
- Nigel Slinger (born 1937), Guyanese former cricketer
- Nigel Smart (born 1969), Australian former AFL player
- Nigel Smart (born 1967), English cryptographer and professor
- Nigel Southward (born 1941), British retired surgeon
- Nigel Spackman (born 1960), English football manager, former professional player, and sports television pundit
- Nigel Sparshott (1961–1998), English speedway rider
- Nigel Spearing (1930–2017), British politician
- Nigel Spencer, Canadian writer, translator, and professor of English
- Nigel Spikes (born 1989), American professional basketball player
- Nigel Spink (born 1958), English football coach and former professional footballer
- Nigel Spivey (born 1958), British classicist and academic
- Nigel Spratley (born 1970), English shot putter
- Nigel Stanford (born 1980), New Zealand composer
- Nigel Staniforth (born 1981), Australian former professional rugby union player
- Nigel Stanton (born 1964), English former diver
- Nigel Stein (born 1955), British businessman
- Nigel Stephenson (born 1950), English former professional rugby league footballer
- Nigel Stepney (1958–2014), British mechanic
- Nigel Stevenson (born 1958), Welsh former international footballer
- Nigel Steward (1899–1991), British diplomat
- Nigel Stock, several people
- Nigel Stonier (born 1956), English rock-, roots-, and pop record producer, songwriter, and multi-instrumentalist
- Nigel Strutt (1916–2004), British Army personnel of World War II
- Nigel Sweeney (born 1954), British former judge
- Nigel Sylvester (born 1987), American professional BMX athlete
- Nigel Tangye (1909–1988), English airman, novelist, journalist, and writer
- Nigel Tapp (1904–1991), British Army major general
- Nigel Taylor (born 1956), British botanist
- Nigel Teare (born 1952), British retired judge
- Nigel Terry (1945–2015), English stage-, film-, and television actor
- Nigel Tetley (1924–1972), British sailor
- Nigél Thatch (born 1976), American actor
- Nigel Thomas (born 2001), Dutch professional footballer
- Nigel Thomas Dupree, American member of southern rock band Nigel Dupree Band
- Nigel Thompson (born 1964), Irish former cricketer
- Nigel Thomson (1945–1999), Australian artist
- Nigel Thorpe (born 1945), British former diplomat
- Nigel Thrift (born 1949), British academic and geographer
- Nigel Tier (born 1958), English retired badminton player
- Nigel Toon, British founder of semiconductor company Graphcore
- Nigel Tourneur, British writer
- Nigel Trance (born 1950), Filipino weightlifter
- Nigel Tranter (1909–2000), Scottish writer
- Nigel Traverso (born 1958), American former field hockey player
- Nigel Travis, English businessman and corporate executive
- Nigel Trench, 7th Baron Ashtown (1916–2010), British peer and diplomat
- Nigel Triffitt (1949–2012), Australian theatre director, actor, designer, and writer
- Nigel Turner (1914–1962), English cricketer
- Nigel Twist (born 1958), Welsh past member of rock band The Alarm
- Nigel Unwin, British neuroscientist and professor
- Nigel Vagana (born 1975), New Zealand former professional rugby league footballer
- Nigel van Oostrum (born 1990), British-Dutch former professional basketball player
- Nigel Vanu (born 1989), Singaporean footballer
- Nigel Vardy, English mountaineer, writer, and amputee
- Nigel Vaughan (born 1959), Welsh former professional footballer
- Nigel Vincent (born 1947), British linguist and professor emeritus
- Nigel Vinson, Baron Vinson (born 1931), British entrepreneur, inventor, philanthropist, and former politician
- Nigel Vonas, Canadian film-, television-, and theatre actor
- Nigel Walker, several people
- Nigel Wallace (born 1967), British sport shooter
- Nigel Walley (born 1941), English former golfer and tea-chest bass player and manager
- Nigel Warburton (born 1962), English philosopher, politician, writer, and book editor
- Nigel Warrior (born 1997), American NFL player
- Nigel Waterson (born 1950), English former politician
- Nigel Watson (1947–2019), English blues-rock guitarist
- Nigel Watts (1919–1995), Australian rugby league footballer
- Nigel Waugh (born 1975), Australian former rugby league- and rugby union player
- Nigel Waymouth (born 1941), American designer and artist
- Nigel Weatherill, English mathematician, engineer, scientist, and professor
- Nigel Weiss (1936–2020), South African professor, astronomer, and mathematician
- Nigel West, pen name of Rupert Allason (born 1951), English former politician and author
- Nigel Westlake (born 1958), Australian composer, musician, and conductor
- Nigel Whitehouse, Welsh rugby union referee
- Nigel Whitmey (born 1963), British-Canadian actor
- Nigel Wicks (born 1940), British financier and former senior civil servant
- Nigel Williams, several people
- Nigel Williamson (born 1954), English journalist
- Nigel Willis (born 1953), South African retired judge
- Nigel Wilson, several people
- Nigel Winfield, American businessman and convicted felon
- Nigel Wingrove (born 1957), English film director
- Nigel Winterburn (born 1963), English former professional footballer
- Nigel Worden (born 1955), British/South African historian and emeritus professor
- Nigel Worthington (born 1961), Northern Irish former professional footballer and manager
- Nigel Wrench, English radio presenter and reporter
- Nigel Wright, several people
- Nigel Xavier (born 1994), American fashion designer
- Nigel Yates (1944–2009), English academic and author
- Nigel Zúniga (born 1972), Honduran former footballer

== Fictional characters ==
- Nigel Moon, in the US TV sitcom Frasier, played by Cameron Dye
- Nigel Planter, in the US animated TV series The Grim Adventures of Billy & Mandy, voiced by Jake Thomas
- Nigel Pargetter, in the UK radio soap opera The Archers
- Making Plans for Nigel, a 1979 song by English rock band XTC
- Nigel Armstrong, in the Australian TV soap opera Neighbours, played by Andy Poulter
- Nigel Bartholomew-Smythe, in the US soap opera One Life to Live, played by Richard Willis, Richard Hunderup, and Peter Bartlett (actor)
- Nigel Barton, two semi-autobiographical TV dramas by UK dramatist, screenwriter, and journalist Dennis Potter
- Nigel Bates, in the UK TV soap opera EastEnders, played by Paul Bradley (English actor) and Sam Miles (2025 flashbacks)
- Nigel Beaverhausen, in the 2004 skateboarding video game Tony Hawk's Underground 2
- Nigel Bloch, in the 2001 first-person shooter video game James Bond 007: Agent Under Fire
- Nigel Crabtree, in the situation comedy series No Place Like Home, played by Martin Clunes and Andrew Charleson
- Nigel Croker, in the UK TV drama Mile High, played by Christopher Villiers
- Nigel Dean, in the UK TV soap opera EastEnders, played by Anthony Jackson (actor)
- Nigel Garrison, in the US TV series Luke Cage, played by Macc H. Plaise (adult) and Alex Allen (young man)
- Nigel Gearsley, in the 2011 US animated spy comedy film Cars 2
- Nigel Kirkland, in the 1998 Japanese cyberpunk anime TV series Bubblegum Crisis Tokyo 2040, voiced by Yūji Ueda (Japanese) and Chris Patton (English)
- Nigel Latta Blows Stuff Up, a New Zealand science TV series, hosted by Nigel Latta
- Nigel Lived, a 1973 album by UK actor and singer Murray Head
- Nigel Molesworth, in 1950s humour books by Geoffrey Willans and Ronald Searle
- Nigel Pinchley, in the US animated sitcom Family Guy
- Nigel Ratburn, in the animated TV series Arthur, voiced by Arthur Holden
- Nigel Small-Fawcett, in the 1983 spy film Never Say Never Again, played by Rowan Atkinson
- Nigel Strangeways, UK private detective created by Anglo-Irish poet Cecil Day-Lewis
- Nigel Taggart, in the Australian TV soap opera Home and Away, played by Gary Down
- Nigel Tippett, in the New Zealand prime-time soap opera Shortland Street, played by Roy Ward
- Nigel Tufnel, in the fictional English heavy metal band Spinal Tap, played by Christopher Guest
- Nigel Uno, in the US animated TV series Codename: Kids Next Door, voiced by Benjamin Diskin
- Nigel West Dickens, in the 2010 action-adventure video game Red Dead Redemption, voiced by Don Creech
- Nigel Wick, in the US TV sitcom The Drew Carey Show, played by Craig Ferguson
- Nigel Wolpert, in the Harry Potter franchise
- Nigel Higgins, in US Marvel Comics
- Sir Nigel (Loring), in the 1905–1906 historical novel based on the life of Neil Loring
- Good Dog Nigel, in the 1964 nonsense book In His Own Write
- Lieutenant Colonel Nigel Chessum, in the US TV sitcom Ghosts, played by John Hartman
- Nigel "Nidge" Delaney, in the Irish crime drama TV series Love/Hate, played by Tom Vaughan-Lawlor
- Nigel Baker, in the 2003 US comedy film Cheaper by the Dozen and its 2005 sequel, played by Brent Kinsman
- Nigel Bathgate, in the 1934 detective novel A Man Lay Dead
- Nigel Bottom, in the musical comedy Something Rotten!, played by John Cariani (2015) and Josh Grisetti (2017–2018)
- Nigel Bumble, in the 2015 action-adventure video game Assassin's Creed Syndicate
- Nigel Burke, in the surgical simulation video game Surgeon Simulator 2013
- Nigel Chapman, in the 1955 novel Hickory Dickory Dock, played by Jonathan Firth in the UK TV adaptation
- Nigel Cronin, in the 1991 black comedy fantasy film Drop Dead Fred, played by Daniel Gerroll
- Nigel Dobson, in the 1992 erotic romantic thriller film Bitter Moon, played by Hugh Grant
- Nigel Forrester, in the 2005 adventure video game Bratz Rock Angelz
- Nigel Olifaunt, Lord Glenvarloch, in the 1822 novel The Fortunes of Nigel
- Nigel Powers, in the 2002 US spy comedy film Austin Powers in Goldmember, played by Michael Caine
- Nigel Vilancey, in the 1995 US fantasy adventure film Jumanji
- Nigel, a brown pelican in the 2003 Disney/Pixar drama adventure comedy animated film Finding Nemo, voiced by Geoffrey Rush
- Nigel, in the 1983 medieval mystery novel The Devil's Novice
- Nigel, in the 1989 US independent coming of age comedy film She's Out of Control, played by Oliver Muirhead
- Nigel, in the 1992 action role-playing video game Landstalker
- Nigel, in the 2000 New Zealand romantic fantasy film The Price of Milk
- Nigel, in the 2009 action-adventure video game Grand Theft Auto: Chinatown Wars
- Nigel, in the 2011 20th Century Fox Animation/Blue Sky Studios animated musical adventure romantic comedy animated film Rio and its 2014 sequel, voiced by Jemaine Clement
- Nigel, in the 2013 action-adventure video game Grand Theft Auto V
- Nigel, in the 2013 free-to-play vehicular combat multiplayer video game War Thunder
- Nigel, in the 2013 romantic drama film Charlie Countryman, played by Mads Mikkelsen
- Nigel, the company mascott of National Instruments, now part of Emerson Electric
- Principal Nigel Brown, in the animated sitcom The Amazing World of Gumball, voiced by Lewis MacLeod (actor) and Steve Furst
- Sir Nigel Thornberry, in the US animated TV series The Wild Thornberrys, voiced by Tim Curry
- Sir Nigel Irvine, in the 1984 UK thriller novel The Fourth Protocol
- Nigel, a character in The Muppets
- N.I.G.E.L., a robot character in Godzilla: The Series

== Dog ==
- Nigel, a Golden Retriever dog that belonged to Monty Don, a British television gardening presenter.
