= Barley (disambiguation) =

Barley is a cereal crop.

Barley may also refer to:

- Barley (surname)
- Barley, Hertfordshire, England
- Barley, Lancashire, village in the civil parish of Barley-with-Wheatley Booth, Lancashire, England
- Barley, a truce term used in Scotland and parts of England and Wales
- Barley Bank, sportsground in Darwen, England
- Barley Bree, Irish/Canadian band
- Barley End, hamlet in Buckinghamshire, England
- Barley Hall (built 1360) an old house in York
- Barley Motor Car Co. American Car maker from 1913 to 1929
- Barley River, a tributary of the Malbaie River in Lac-Pikauba, Quebec, Canada

== See also ==
- The Barley Mow song and common pub name
