= Atheism =

Absence of belief in the existence of deities; the opposite of theism

Atheism, in the broadest sense, is an absence of belief in the existence of deities. Less broadly, atheism is a rejection of the belief that any deities exist. In an even narrower sense, atheism is specifically the position that there are no deities. Atheism is contrasted with theism, which is the belief that at least one deity exists.

Historically, evidence of atheistic viewpoints can be traced back to classical antiquity and early Indian philosophy. In the Western world, atheism declined after Christianity gained prominence. The 16th century and the Age of Enlightenment marked the resurgence of atheistic thought in Europe. Atheism achieved a significant position worldwide in the 20th century. Estimates of those who have an absence of theistic belief range from 500 million to 1.1 billion people. Atheist organizations have defended the autonomy of science, freedom of thought, secularism, and secular ethics.

Arguments for atheism range from philosophical to scientific to social approaches. Rationales for not believing in deities include the lack of evidence, the problem of evil, the argument from inconsistent revelations, the rejection of concepts that cannot be falsified, and the argument from nonbelief. Nonbelievers contend that atheism is a more parsimonious position than theism and that everyone is born without beliefs in deities; therefore, they argue that the burden of proof lies not on the atheist to disprove the existence of gods but on the theist to provide a rationale for theism.

== Definition ==
Writers disagree on how best to define and classify atheism, contesting what supernatural entities are considered gods, whether atheism is a philosophical position or merely the absence of one, and whether it requires a conscious, explicit rejection; however, the norm is to define atheism in terms of an explicit stance against theism. Atheism has been regarded as compatible with agnosticism, but has also been contrasted with it.

=== Implicit vs. explicit ===
A diagram showing the relationship between the definitions of weak/strong and implicit/explicit atheism (sizes in the diagram are not meant to indicate relative sizes within a population). Explicit strong/positive atheists (in purple on the right) assert that "at least one deity exists" is a false statement. Explicit weak/negative atheists (in blue on the right) reject or eschew belief that any deities exist without asserting that "at least one deity exists" is a false statement. Implicit weak/negative atheists (in blue on the left) would include people (such as young children and some agnostics) who do not believe in a deity but have not explicitly rejected such belief.

Some of the ambiguity involved in defining atheism arises from the definitions of words like deity and god. The variety of wildly different conceptions of deities leads to differing ideas regarding atheism's applicability. The ancient Romans accused Christians of being atheists for not worshiping the pagan deities. Gradually, this view fell into disfavor as theism came to be understood as encompassing belief in any divinity. With respect to the range of phenomena being rejected, atheism may counter anything from the existence of a deity to the existence of any spiritual, supernatural, or transcendental concepts. Definitions of atheism also vary in the degree of consideration a person must put to the idea of gods to be considered an atheist. Atheism has been defined as the absence of belief that any deities exist. This broad definition would include newborns and other people who have not been exposed to theistic ideas. As far back as 1772, Baron d'Holbach said that "All children are born Atheists; they have no idea of God." Similarly, George H. Smith suggested that: "The man who is unacquainted with theism is an atheist because he does not believe in a god. This category would also include the child with the conceptual capacity to grasp the issues involved, but who is still unaware of those issues. The fact that this child does not believe in god qualifies him as an atheist."

Implicit atheism is "the absence of theistic belief without a conscious rejection of it" and explicit atheism is the conscious rejection of belief. It is usual to define atheism in terms of an explicit stance against theism. For the purposes of his paper on "philosophical atheism", Ernest Nagel contested including the mere absence of theistic belief as a type of atheism. Graham Oppy classifies as innocents those who never considered the question because they lack any understanding of what a god is, for example one-month-old babies.

=== Negative vs. positive ===
Philosophers such as Antony Flew and Michael Martin have contrasted positive (strong/hard) atheism with negative (weak/soft) atheism. Positive atheism is the explicit affirmation that gods do not exist. Negative atheism includes all other forms of non-theism. According to this categorization, anyone who is not a theist is either a negative or a positive atheist. Michael Martin, for example, asserts that agnosticism entails negative atheism. Agnostic atheism encompasses both atheism and agnosticism. However, many agnostics see their view as distinct from atheism.

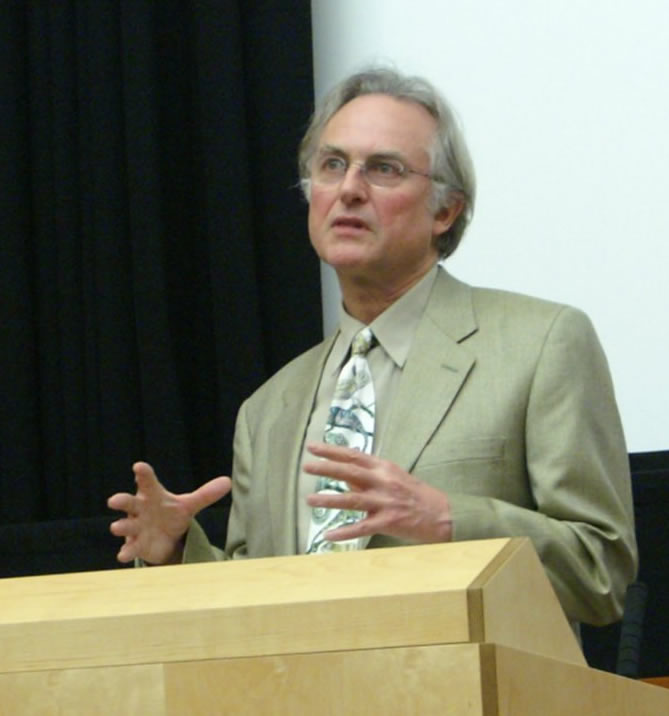
Richard Dawkins sees theist, agnostic, and atheist positions as existing along a spectrum of theistic probability

According to atheists' arguments, unproven religious propositions deserve as much disbelief as all other unproven propositions. Atheist criticism of agnosticism says that the unprovability of a god's existence does not imply an equal probability of either possibility. Australian philosopher J.J.C. Smart argues that "sometimes a person who is really an atheist may describe herself, even passionately, as an agnostic because of unreasonable generalized philosophical skepticism which would preclude us from saying that we know anything whatever, except perhaps the truths of mathematics and formal logic." Consequently, some atheist authors, such as Richard Dawkins, prefer distinguishing theist, agnostic, and atheist positions along a spectrum of theistic probability—the likelihood that each assigns to the statement "God exists".

Before the 18th century, the existence of God was so accepted in the Western world that even the possibility of true atheism was questioned. This is called theistic innatism—the notion that all people believe in God from birth; within this view was the connotation that atheists are in denial. Some atheists have challenged the need for the term "atheism". In his book Letter to a Christian Nation, Sam Harris wrote:

In fact, "atheism" is a term that should not even exist. No one ever needs to identify himself as a "non-astrologer" or a "non-alchemist". We do not have words for people who doubt that Elvis is still alive or that aliens have traversed the galaxy only to molest ranchers and their cattle. Atheism is nothing more than the noises reasonable people make in the presence of unjustified religious beliefs.

== Etymology ==
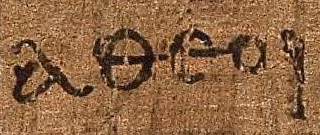
The Greek word "atheoi" αθεοι ("[those who are] without god") as it appears in the Epistle to the Ephesians 2:12, on the early 3rd-century Papyrus 46.

In early ancient Greek, the adjective átheos (ἄθεος, from the privative ἀ- + θεός "god") meant "godless". It was first used as a term of censure roughly meaning "ungodly" or "impious". In the 5th century BCE, the word began to indicate more deliberate and active godlessness in the sense of "severing relations with the gods" or "denying the gods". The term ἀσεβής (asebēs) then came to be applied against those who impiously denied or disrespected the local gods, even if they believed in other gods. Modern translations of classical texts sometimes render átheos as "atheistic". As an abstract noun, there was also ἀθεότης (atheotēs), "atheism". Cicero transliterated the Greek word into the Latin átheos. The term found frequent use in the debate between early Christians and Hellenists, with each side attributing it, in the pejorative sense, to the other.

The term atheist (from the French athée), in the sense of "one who ... denies the existence of God or gods", predates atheism in English, being first found as early as 1566, and again in 1571. Atheist as a label of practical godlessness was used at least as early as 1577. The term atheism was derived from the French athéisme, and appears in English about 1587.

Atheism was first used to describe a self-avowed belief in late 18th-century Europe, specifically denoting disbelief in the monotheistic Abrahamic god. (Note: In part because of its wide use in monotheistic Western society, atheism is usually described as "disbelief in God", rather than more generally as "disbelief in deities". A clear distinction is rarely drawn in modern writings between these two definitions, but some archaic uses of atheism encompassed only disbelief in the singular God, not in polytheistic deities. It is on this basis that the obsolete term adevism was coined in the late 19th century to describe an absence of belief in plural deities.) In the 20th century, globalization contributed to the expansion of the term to refer to disbelief in all deities, though it remains common in Western society to describe atheism as "disbelief in God".

== Arguments ==
=== Epistemological arguments ===
Skepticism, based on the ideas of David Hume, asserts that certainty about anything is impossible, so one can never know for sure whether or not a god exists. Hume, however, held that such unobservable metaphysical concepts should be rejected as "sophistry and illusion".

Michael Martin argues that atheism is a justified and rational true belief, but offers no extended epistemological justification because current theories are in a state of controversy. Martin instead argues for "mid-level principles of justification that are in accord with our ordinary and scientific rational practice."

Other arguments for atheism that can be classified as epistemological or ontological, assert the meaninglessness or unintelligibility of basic terms such as "God" and statements such as "God is all-powerful." Theological noncognitivism holds that the statement "God exists" does not express a proposition, but is nonsensical or cognitively meaningless. It has been argued both ways as to whether such individuals can be classified into some form of atheism or agnosticism. Philosophers A. J. Ayer and Theodore M. Drange reject both categories, stating that both camps accept "God exists" as a proposition; they instead place noncognitivism in its own category.

=== Ontological arguments ===
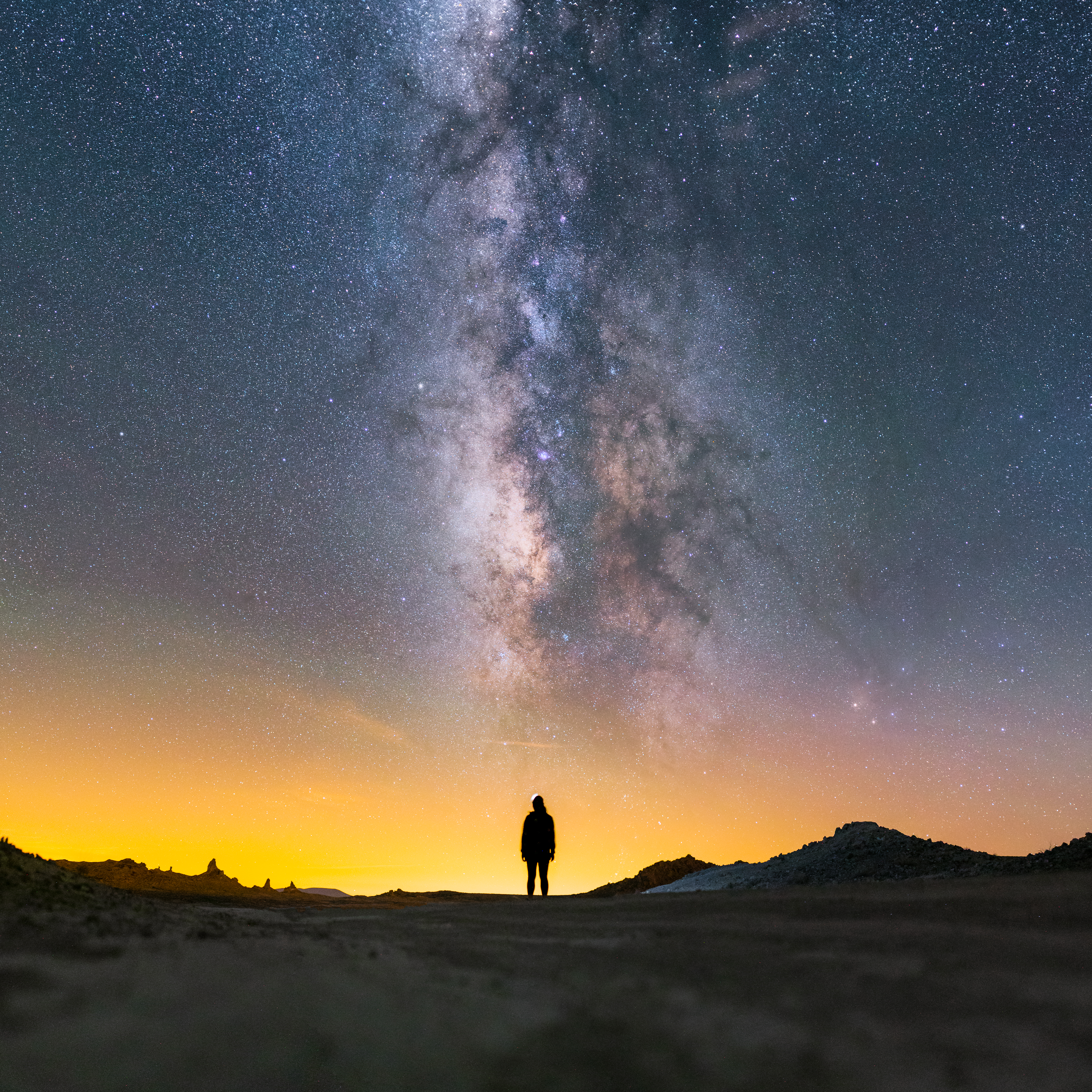
According to naturalism, nature is all-encompassing.

Most atheists lean toward ontological monism: the belief that there is only one kind of fundamental substance. Philosophical materialism is a view that matter is the fundamental substance in nature. This omits the possibility of a non-material divine being. According to physicalism, only physical entities exist. Philosophies opposed to the materialism or physicalism include idealism, dualism and other forms of monism. Naturalism is also used to describe the view that everything that exists is fundamentally natural, and that there are no supernatural phenomena. According to naturalist view, science can explain the world with physical laws and through natural phenomena. Philosopher Graham Oppy references a PhilPapers survey that says 56.5% of philosophers in academics lean toward physicalism; 49.8% lean toward naturalism.

According to Graham Oppy, direct arguments for atheism aim at showing theism fails on its own terms, while indirect arguments are those inferred from direct arguments in favor of something else that is inconsistent with theism. For example, Oppy says arguing for naturalism is an argument for atheism since naturalism and theism "cannot both be true". Fiona Ellis describes the "expansive naturalism" of John McDowell, James Griffin, and David Wiggins while also asserting there are things in human experience which cannot be explained in such terms, such as the concept of value, leaving room for theism. Christopher C. Knight asserts a theistic naturalism. Nevertheless, Oppy argues that a strong naturalism favors atheism, though he finds the best direct arguments against theism to be the evidential problem of evil, and arguments concerning the contradictory nature of God were one to exist.

=== Logical arguments ===
Some atheists hold the view that the various conceptions of gods, such as the personal god of Christianity, are ascribed logically inconsistent qualities. Such atheists present deductive arguments against the existence of God, which assert the incompatibility between certain traits, such as perfection, creator-status, immutability, omniscience, omnipresence, omnipotence, omnibenevolence, transcendence, personhood (a personal being), non-physicality, justice, and mercy.

Theodicean atheists believe that the world as they experience it cannot be reconciled with the qualities commonly ascribed to God and gods by theologians. They argue that an omniscient, omnipotent, and omnibenevolent God is not compatible with a world where there is evil and suffering, and where divine love is hidden from many people.

Epicurus is credited with first expounding the problem of evil. David Hume in his Dialogues concerning Natural Religion (1779) cited Epicurus in stating the argument as a series of questions: "Is God willing to prevent evil, but not able? Then he is impotent. Is he able, but not willing? Then he is malevolent. Is he both able and willing? Then whence cometh evil? Is he neither able nor willing? Then why call him God?" Similar arguments have been made in Buddhist philosophy. Vasubandhu (4th/5th century) outlined numerous Buddhist arguments against God.

=== Secular accounts of religion ===
Philosopher Ludwig Feuerbach and psychoanalyst Sigmund Freud have argued that God and other religious beliefs are human inventions, created to fulfill various psychological and emotional wants or needs. Karl Marx and Friedrich Engels, influenced by the work of Feuerbach, argued that belief in God and religion are social functions, used by those in power to oppress the working class. According to Mikhail Bakunin, "the idea of God implies the abdication of human reason and justice; it is the most decisive negation of human liberty, and necessarily ends in the enslavement of mankind, in theory, and practice." He reversed Voltaire's aphorism that if God did not exist, it would be necessary to invent him, writing instead that "if God really existed, it would be necessary to abolish him."

== Atheism and ethics ==
=== Secular ethics ===
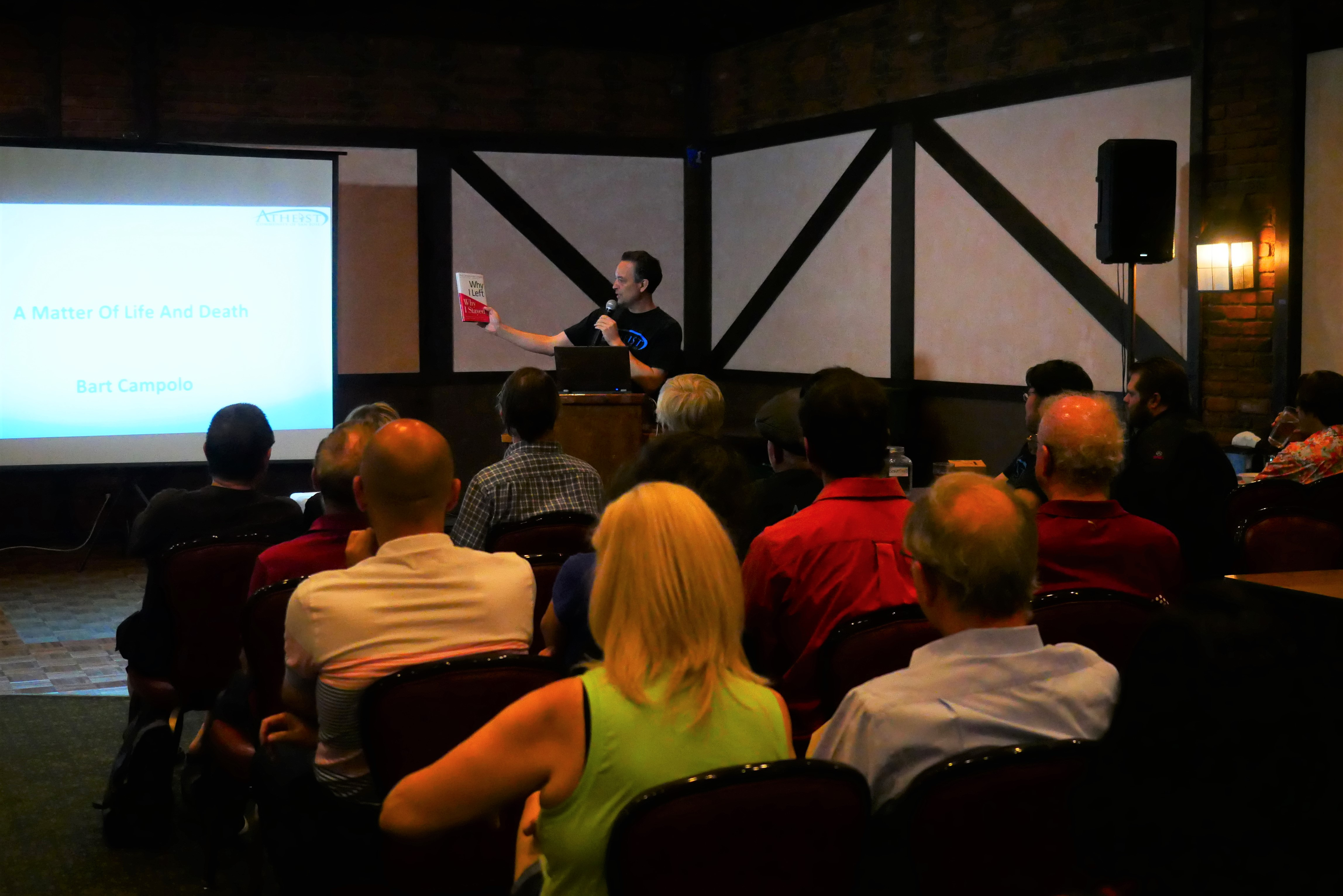
Lecture to the Atheist Community of San Jose in 2017.

Sociologist Phil Zuckerman analyzed previous social science research on secularity and non-belief and concluded that societal well-being is positively correlated with irreligion. He found that there are much lower concentrations of atheism and secularity in poorer, less developed nations (particularly in Africa and South America) than in the richer industrialized democracies. His findings relating specifically to atheism in the US were that compared to religious people in the US, "atheists and secular people" are less nationalistic, prejudiced, antisemitic, racist, dogmatic, ethnocentric, closed-minded, and authoritarian, and in US states with the highest percentages of atheists, the murder rate is lower than average. In the most religious states, the murder rate is higher than average.

Joseph Baker and Buster Smith assert that one of the common themes of atheism is that most atheists "typically construe atheism as more moral than religion". One of the most common criticisms of atheism has been to the contrary: that denying the existence of a god either leads to moral relativism and leaves one with no moral or ethical foundation, or renders life meaningless and miserable. Blaise Pascal argued this view in his Pensées. There is also a position claiming that atheists are quick to believe in God in times of crisis, that atheists make deathbed conversions, or that "there are no atheists in foxholes". There have, however, been examples to the contrary, among them examples of literal "atheists in foxholes". There exist normative ethical systems that do not require principles and rules to be given by a deity.

According to Plato's Euthyphro dilemma, the role of the gods in determining right from wrong is either unnecessary or arbitrary. The argument that morality must be derived from God, and cannot exist without a wise creator, has been a persistent feature of political if not so much philosophical debate. Moral precepts such as "murder is wrong" are seen as divine laws, requiring a divine lawmaker and judge. However, many atheists argue that treating morality legalistically involves a false analogy, and that morality does not depend on a lawmaker in the same way that laws do.

Philosophers Susan Neiman and Julian Baggini among others assert that behaving ethically only because of a divine mandate is not true ethical behavior but merely blind obedience. Baggini argues that atheism is a superior basis for ethics, claiming that a moral basis external to religious imperatives is necessary to evaluate the morality of the imperatives themselves—to be able to discern, for example, that "thou shalt steal" is immoral even if one's religion instructs it—and that atheists, therefore, have the advantage of being more inclined to make such evaluations.

=== Criticism of religion ===
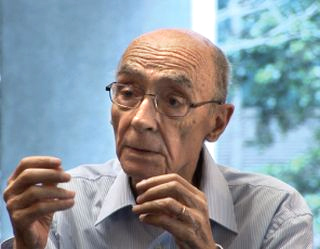
Author José Saramago criticizes religion.

Some prominent atheists—most recently Christopher Hitchens, Daniel Dennett, Sam Harris, and Richard Dawkins, and following such thinkers as Bertrand Russell, Robert G. Ingersoll, Voltaire, and novelist José Saramago—have criticized religions, citing harmful aspects of religious practices and doctrines.

The 19th-century German political theorist and sociologist Karl Marx called religion "the sigh of the oppressed creature, the heart of a heartless world, and the soul of soulless conditions. It is the opium of the people". He goes on to say, "The abolition of religion as the illusory happiness of the people is the demand for their real happiness. To call on them to give up their illusions about their condition is to call on them to give up a condition that requires illusions. The criticism of religion is, therefore, in embryo, the criticism of that vale of tears of which religion is the halo."

Sam Harris criticizes Western religion's reliance on divine authority as lending itself to authoritarianism and dogmatism. Multiple studies have discovered there to be a correlation between religious fundamentalism and extrinsic religion (when religion is held because it serves ulterior interests) and authoritarianism, dogmatism, and prejudice.

These arguments—combined with historical events that are argued to demonstrate the dangers of religion, such as the Crusades, inquisitions, witch trials, and terrorist attacks—have been used in response to claims of beneficial effects of belief in religion. Believers counter-argue that some regimes that espouse atheism, such as the Soviet Union, have also been guilty of mass murder. In response to those claims, atheists such as Sam Harris and Richard Dawkins have stated that Stalin's atrocities were influenced not by atheism but by dogmatic ideology, and that while Stalin and Mao happened to be atheists, they did not do their deeds in the name of atheism.

=== Atheism, religions, and spirituality ===
People who self-identify as atheists are often assumed to be irreligious, but some sects within major religions reject the existence of a personal, creator deity. It has been said that atheism is not mutually exclusive with respect to some religious and spiritual belief systems, including modern Neopagan movements. In recent years, certain religious denominations have accumulated a number of openly atheistic followers, such as atheistic or humanistic Judaism and Christian atheists. Atheism is accepted as a valid philosophical position within some varieties of Hinduism, Jainism, and Buddhism.

== History ==
=== Early Indian religions ===
Ideas that would be recognized today as atheistic are documented in the Vedic period and the classical antiquity. Atheistic schools are found in early Indian thought and have existed from the times of the historical Vedic religion. Among the six orthodox schools of Hindu philosophy, Samkhya, the oldest philosophical school of thought does not accept God, and the early Mimamsa also rejected the notion of God.

The thoroughly materialistic and anti-theistic philosophical Chārvāka (or Lokāyata) a school that originated in India around the 6th century BCE is probably the most explicitly atheistic school of philosophy in India, similar to the Greek Cyrenaic school. This branch of Indian philosophy is classified as heterodox due to its rejection of the authority of Vedas and hence is not considered part of the six orthodox schools of Indian philosophy. It is noteworthy as evidence of a materialistic movement in ancient India.

Satischandra Chatterjee and Dhirendramohan Datta explain in An Introduction to Indian Philosophy that our understanding of Chārvāka philosophy is fragmentary, based largely on criticism of the ideas by other schools: "Though materialism in some form or other, has always been present in India, and occasional references are found in the Vedas, the Buddhistic literature, the Epics, as well as in the later philosophical works we do not find any systematic work on materialism, nor any organized school of followers as the other philosophical schools possess. But almost every work of the other schools states, for refutation, the materialistic views. Our knowledge of Indian materialism is chiefly based on these." Other Indian philosophies generally regarded as atheistic include Classical Samkhya and Purva Mimamsa. The rejection of a personal creator, "God", is also seen in Jainism and Buddhism in India.

=== Classical antiquity ===
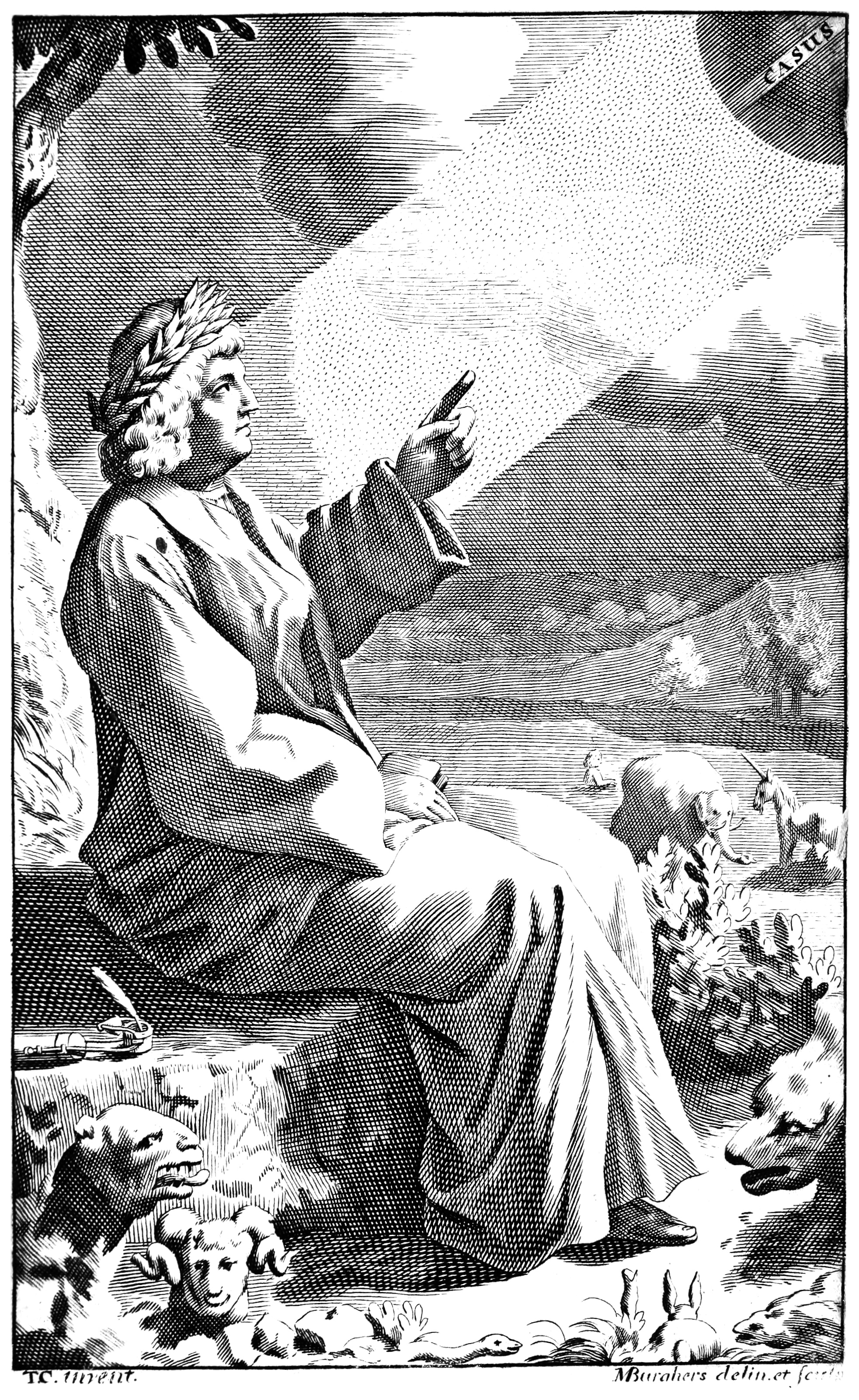
Lucretius pointing to the casus, the downward movement of the atoms. In his work De rerum natura, Lucretius stated that everything consists of material substance moving in infinity.

Western atheism has its roots in pre-Socratic Greek philosophy, but atheism in the modern sense was extremely rare in ancient Greece. Pre-Socratic Atomists such as Democritus attempted to explain the world in a purely materialistic way and interpreted religion as a human reaction to natural phenomena, but did not explicitly deny the gods' existence.

Anaxagoras, whom Irenaeus calls "the atheist", was accused of impiety and condemned for stating that "the sun is a type of incandescent stone", an affirmation with which he tried to deny the divinity of the celestial bodies. In the late fifth century BCE, the Greek lyric poet Diagoras of Melos was sentenced to death in Athens under the charge of being a "godless person" (ἄθεος) after he made fun of the Eleusinian Mysteries, but he fled the city to escape punishment. In post-classical antiquity, philosophers such as Cicero and Sextus Empiricus described Diagoras as an "atheist" who categorically denied the existence of the gods, but in modern scholarship Marek Winiarczyk has defended the view that Diagoras was not an atheist in the modern sense, in a view that has proved influential. On the other hand, the verdict has been challenged by Tim Whitmarsh, who argues that Diagoras rejected the gods on the basis of the problem of evil, and this argument was in turn alluded to in Euripides' fragmentary play Bellerophon. A fragment from a lost Attic drama that featured Sisyphus, which has been attributed to both Critias and Euripides, claims that a clever man invented "the fear of the gods" in order to frighten people into behaving morally.

Does then anyone say there are gods in heaven? There are not, there are not, if a man is willing not to give foolish credence to the ancient story. Consider for yourselves, don't form an opinion on the basis of my words!

— Bellerophon denying the existence of the gods, from Euripides' Bellerophon c. 5th century BCE, fr. 286 TrGF 1-5

Protagoras has sometimes been taken to be an atheist, but rather espoused agnostic views, commenting that "Concerning the gods I am unable to discover whether they exist or not, or what they are like in form; for there are many hindrances to knowledge, the obscurity of the subject and the brevity of human life." The Athenian public associated Socrates (c. 470–399 BCE) with the trends in pre-Socratic philosophy towards naturalistic inquiry and the rejection of divine explanations for phenomena. Aristophanes' comic play The Clouds (performed 423 BCE) portrays Socrates as teaching his students that the traditional Greek deities do not exist. Socrates was later tried and executed under the charge of not believing in the gods of the state and instead worshipping foreign gods. Socrates himself vehemently denied the charges of atheism at his trial. From a survey of these 5th-century BCE philosophers, David Sedley has concluded that none of them openly defended radical atheism, but since Classical sources clearly attest to radical atheist ideas Athens probably had an "atheist underground".

Religious skepticism continued into the Hellenistic period, and from this period the most important Greek thinker in the development of atheism was the philosopher Epicurus (c. 300 BCE). Drawing on the ideas of Democritus and the Atomists, he espoused a materialistic philosophy according to which the universe was governed by the laws of chance without the need for divine intervention (see scientific determinism). Although Epicurus still maintained that the gods existed, he believed that they were uninterested in human affairs. The aim of the Epicureans was to attain ataraxia ("peace of mind") and one important way of doing this was by exposing fear of divine wrath as irrational. The Epicureans also denied the existence of an afterlife and the need to fear divine punishment after death.

Euhemerus (c. 300 BCE) published his view that the gods were only the deified rulers and founders of the past. Although not strictly an atheist, Euhemerus was later criticized by Plutarch for having "spread atheism over the whole inhabited earth by obliterating the gods". In the 3rd century BCE, the Hellenistic philosophers Theodorus Cyrenaicus and Strato of Lampsacus were also reputed to deny the existence of the gods. The Pyrrhonist philosopher Sextus Empiricus (c. 200 CE) compiled a large number of ancient arguments against the existence of gods, recommending that one should suspend judgment regarding the matter. His relatively large volume of surviving works had a lasting influence on later philosophers.

The meaning of "atheist" changed over the course of classical antiquity. Early Christians were widely reviled as "atheists" because they did not believe in the existence of the Graeco-Roman deities. During the Roman Empire, Christians were executed for their rejection of the Roman gods in general and the Imperial cult of ancient Rome in particular. There was, however, a heavy struggle between Christians and pagans, in which each group accused the other of atheism, for not practicing the religion which they considered correct. When Christianity became the state religion of Rome under Theodosius I in 381, heresy became a punishable offense.

=== Early Middle Ages to the Renaissance ===
During the Early Middle Ages, the Islamic world experienced a Golden Age. Along with advances in science and philosophy, Arab and Persian lands produced rationalists who were skeptical about revealed religion, such as Muhammad al Warraq (fl. 9th century), Ibn al-Rawandi (827–911), and Abu Bakr al-Razi (c. 865–925), as well as outspoken atheists such as al-Maʿarri (973–1058). Al-Ma'arri wrote and taught that religion itself was a "fable invented by the ancients" and that humans were "of two sorts: those with brains, but no religion, and those with religion, but no brains". Despite the fact that these authors were relatively prolific writers, little of their work survives, mainly being preserved through quotations and excerpts in later works by Muslim apologists attempting to refute them.

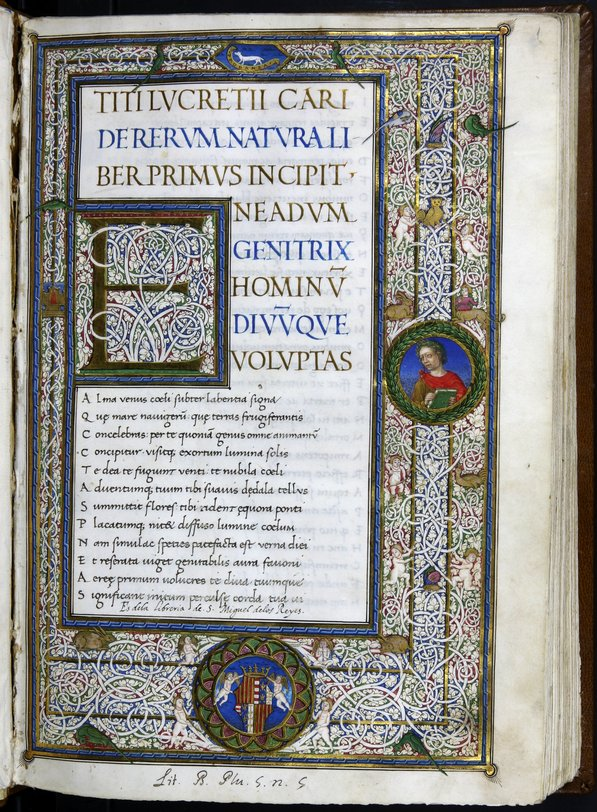
De rerum natura by Lucretius, between 1475 and 1494.

In Europe, the espousal of atheistic views was rare during the Early Middle Ages and Middle Ages (see Medieval Inquisition). There were, however, movements within this period that furthered heterodox conceptions of the Christian god, including differing views of the nature, transcendence, and knowability of God. William of Ockham inspired anti-metaphysical tendencies with his nominalist limitation of human knowledge to singular objects, and asserted that the divine essence could not be intuitively or rationally apprehended by human intellect. Sects deemed heretical such as the Waldensians were also accused of being atheistic. The resulting division between faith and reason influenced later radical and reformist theologians.

The Renaissance did much to expand the scope of free thought and skeptical inquiry. Individuals such as Leonardo da Vinci sought experimentation as a means of explanation instead of arguments from religious authority. Critics of religion and the Church during this time included Niccolò Machiavelli who, although never avowing his atheism in his writings, is claimed to be an atheist. Other alleged critics are Bonaventure des Périers, Michel de Montaigne, and François Rabelais.

=== Early modern period ===
Historian Geoffrey Blainey wrote that the Reformation had paved the way for atheists by attacking the authority of the Catholic Church, which in turn "quietly inspired other thinkers to attack the authority of the new Protestant churches". Deism gained influence in France, Prussia, and England. In 1546, French scholar Etienne Dolet was executed upon accusation of being an atheist. The philosopher Baruch Spinoza was "probably the first well known 'semi-atheist' to announce himself in a Christian land in the modern era", according to Blainey. Spinoza believed that natural laws explained the workings of the universe. In 1661, he published his Short Treatise on God.

Criticism of Christianity became increasingly frequent in the 17th and 18th centuries, especially in France and England. Some Protestant thinkers, such as Thomas Hobbes, espoused a materialist philosophy and skepticism toward supernatural occurrences. By the late 17th century, deism came to be openly espoused by intellectuals. The first known explicit atheist was the German critic of religion Matthias Knutzen in his three writings of 1674. He was followed by two other explicit atheist writers, the Polish ex-Jesuit philosopher Kazimierz Łyszczyński (who most likely authored the world's first treatise on the non-existence of God) and in the 1720s by the French priest Jean Meslier.

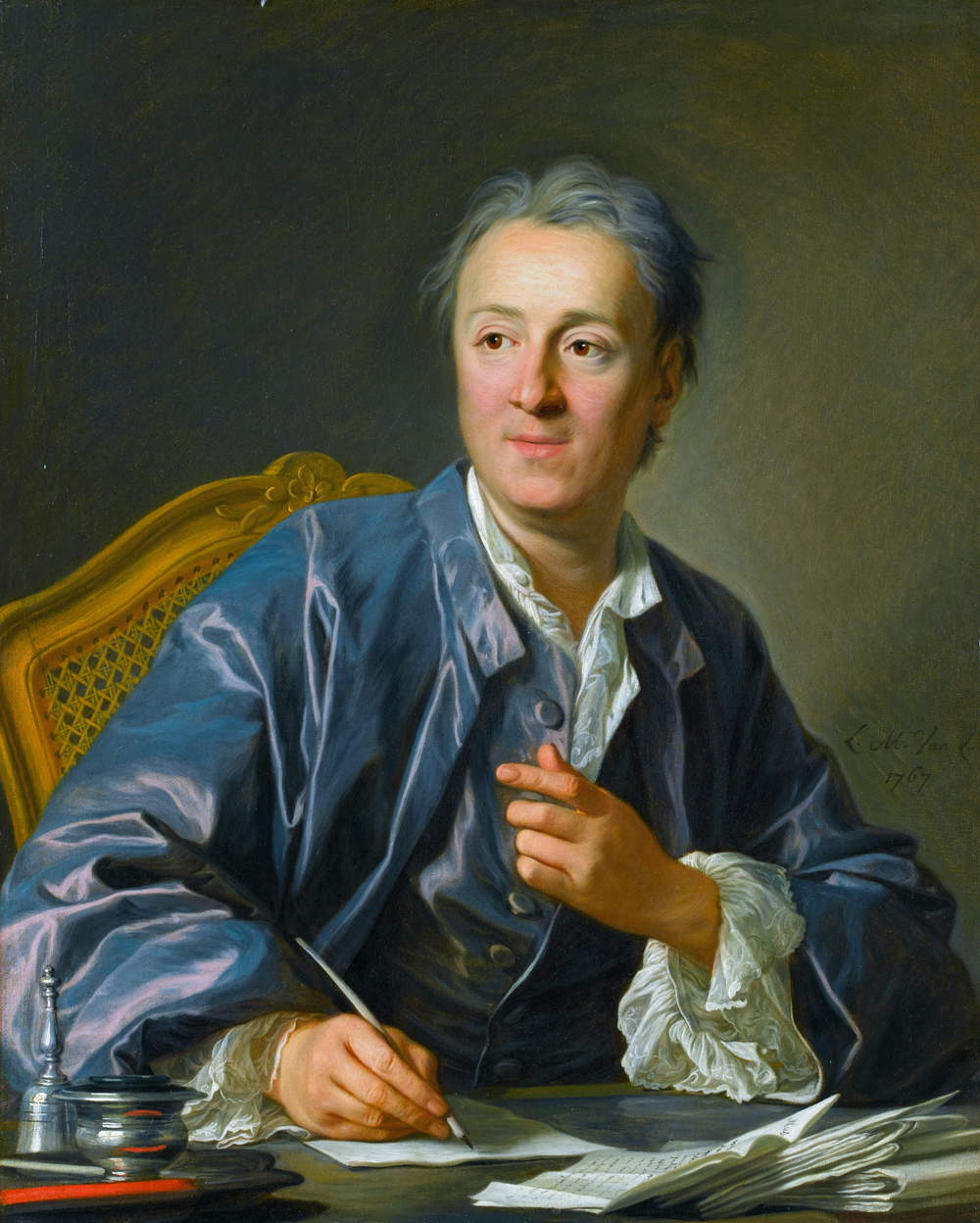
Denis Diderot, atheist and editor of Encyclopédie.

In the course of the 18th century, other openly atheistic thinkers followed, such as Baron d'Holbach, Jacques-André Naigeon, and other French materialists. Baron d'Holbach was a prominent figure in the French Enlightenment who is best known for his atheism and for his voluminous writings against religion, the most famous of them being The System of Nature (1770) but also Christianity Unveiled.

The source of man's unhappiness is his ignorance of Nature. The pertinacity with which he clings to blind opinions imbibed in his infancy, which interweave themselves with his existence, the consequent prejudice that warps his mind, that prevents its expansion, that renders him the slave of fiction, appears to doom him to continual error.

— Baron d'Holbach, System of Nature, 1770

In Great Britain, William Hammon and physician Mathew Turner authored a pamphlet in response to Joseph Priestley's Letters to a Philosophical Unbeliever. Theirs was the first work in English to openly defend atheism, and implied that established sentiment of Christianity made speaking up in defense of atheism an act with a reasonable expectation of public punishment.

Although Voltaire is widely considered to have strongly contributed to atheistic thinking during the Revolution, he also considered fear of God to have discouraged further disorder, having said "If God did not exist, it would be necessary to invent him." The philosopher David Hume developed a skeptical epistemology grounded in empiricism, and Immanuel Kant's philosophy has strongly questioned the very possibility of metaphysical knowledge. Both philosophers undermined the metaphysical basis of natural theology and criticized classical arguments for the existence of God.

One goal of the French Revolution was a restructuring and subordination of the clergy with respect to the state through the Civil Constitution of the Clergy. Attempts to enforce it led to anti-clerical violence and the expulsion of many clerics from France, lasting until the Thermidorian Reaction. The radical Jacobins seized power in 1793. The Jacobins were deists and introduced the Cult of the Supreme Being as a new French state religion.

In the latter half of the 19th century, atheism rose to prominence under the influence of rationalistic and freethinking philosophers. German philosopher Ludwig Feuerbach considered God to be a human invention and religious activities to be wish-fulfillment. He influenced philosophers such as Karl Marx and Friedrich Nietzsche, who denied the existence of deities and were critical of religion. In 1842, George Holyoake was the last person imprisoned in Great Britain due to atheist beliefs. Stephen Law notes that he may have also been the first imprisoned on such a charge. Law states that Holyoake "first coined the term 'secularism'".

=== 20th century ===
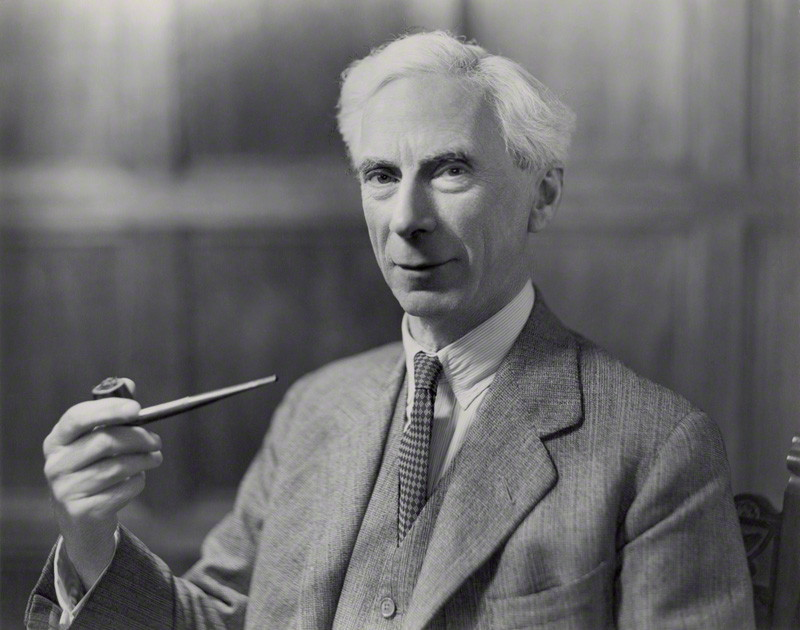
Bertrand Russell

Atheism advanced in many societies in the 20th century. Atheistic thought found recognition in a wide variety of other, broader philosophies, such as Marxism, logical positivism, existentialism, humanism and feminism, and the general scientific movement. Proponents of naturalism such as Bertrand Russell and John Dewey emphatically rejected belief in God. Analytical philosophers such as J.N. Findlay and J.J.C. Smart argued against the existence of God.

State atheism emerged in Eastern Europe and Asia, particularly in the Soviet Union under Vladimir Lenin and Joseph Stalin, and in Communist China under Mao Zedong. Atheist and anti-religious policies in the Soviet Union included numerous legislative acts, the outlawing of religious instruction in the schools, and the emergence of the League of Militant Atheists. Stalin softened his opposition to the Orthodox church in order to improve public acceptance of his regime during the second world war.

In 1966, Time magazine asked "Is God Dead?" in response to the Death of God theological movement, citing the estimation that nearly half of all people in the world lived under an anti-religious power, and millions more in Africa, Asia, and South America seemed to lack knowledge of the Christian view of theology.

Leaders like Periyar E.V. Ramasamy, a prominent atheist leader of India, fought against Hinduism and Brahmins for discriminating and dividing people in the name of caste and religion. In the United States, atheist Vashti McCollum was the plaintiff in a 1948 Supreme Court case that struck down religious education in US public schools. Madalyn Murray O'Hair was one of the most influential American atheists; she brought forth the 1963 Supreme Court case Murray v. Curlett which banned compulsory prayer in public schools. The Freedom from Religion Foundation was co-founded by Anne Nicol Gaylor and her daughter, Annie Laurie Gaylor, in 1976 in the United States. It promotes the separation of church and state.

=== 21st century ===
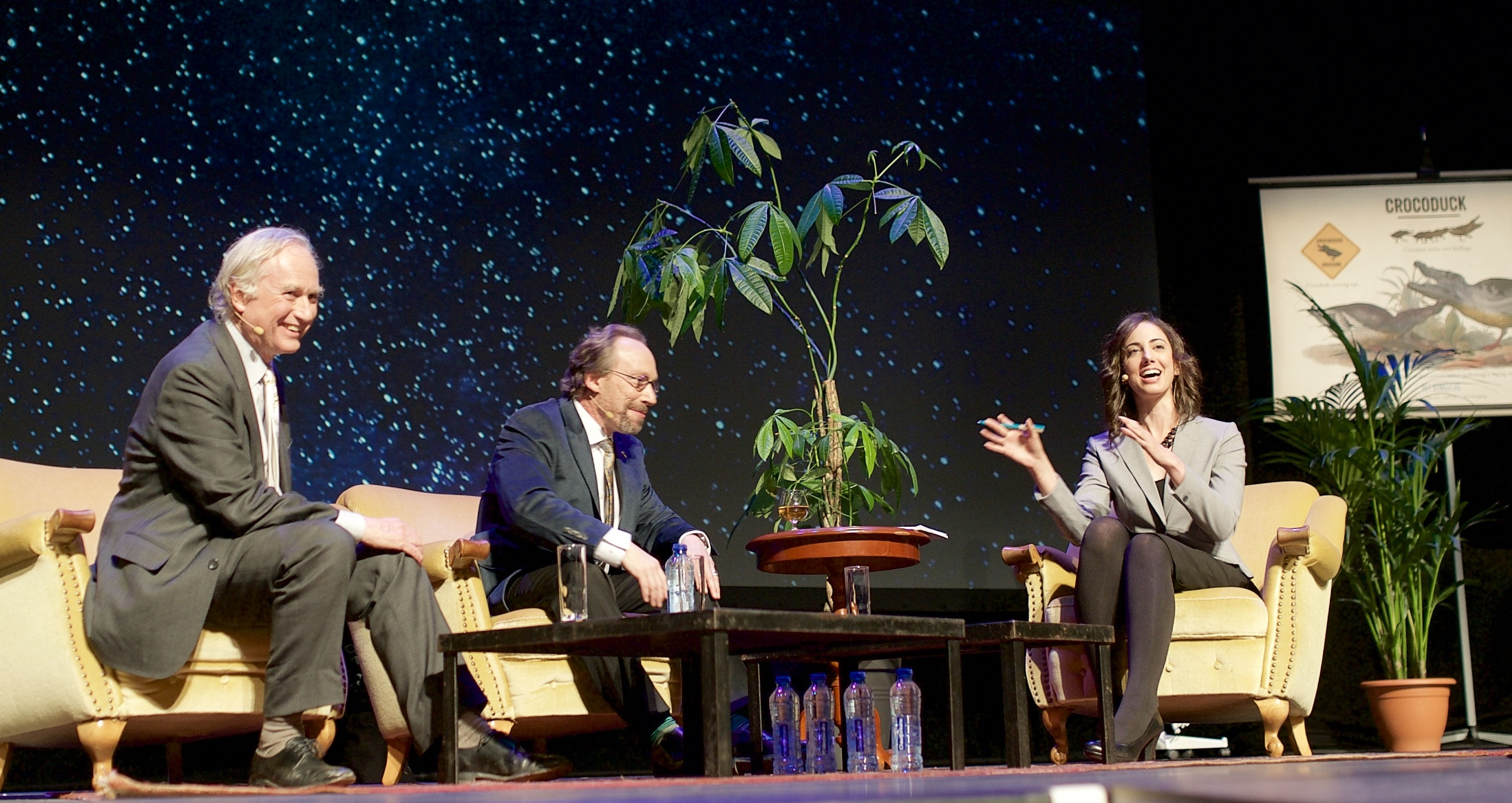
Richard Dawkins, Lawrence Krauss and Julia Galef in 2015

"New Atheism" is a movement among some early-21st-century atheist writers who have advocated the view that "religion should not be tolerated but should be countered, criticized, and exposed by rational argument wherever its influence arises". The movement is commonly associated with Sam Harris, Daniel Dennett, Richard Dawkins, Christopher Hitchens, and Victor J. Stenger. The religiously motivated terrorist events of 9/11 and the partially successful attempts to change the American science curriculum to include creationist ideas, together with support for those ideas from the religious right, have been cited by "new" atheists as evidence of a need to move toward a more secular society.

Melbourne hosted the first Global Atheist Convention in 2010 (branded as the largest event of its kind in the world), sponsored by the Atheist Foundation of Australia and Atheist Alliance International. It took place at the Melbourne Convention & Exhibition Centre from 12 to 14 March that year. Over 2,000 delegates attended, with all available tickets selling out more than five weeks prior to the event. A second conference was held, also in Melbourne, from 13 to 15 April 2012. A third convention, planned for February 2018, was cancelled, apparently because of insufficient interest.

== Demographics ==
Nonreligious population by country, 2010

It is difficult to quantify the number of atheists in the world. Respondents to religious-belief polls may define "atheism" differently or draw different distinctions between atheism, non-religious beliefs, and non-theistic religious and spiritual beliefs. A 2010 survey published in Encyclopædia Britannica found that the non-religious made up about 9.6% of the world's population, and atheists about 2.0%. This survey synthesized recently-published census and survey data, following methodologies published by the World Christian Encyclopedia. The figures cited did not include those who follow atheistic religions, such as some Buddhists. The average annual change for atheism from 2000 to 2010 was −0.17%. Global atheism may be in decline as a percentage of the global population due to irreligious countries having the lowest birth rates in the world and religious countries generally having higher birth rates.

According to global Win-Gallup International studies, 13% of respondents were "convinced atheists" in 2012, 11% were "convinced atheists" in 2015, and in 2017, 9% were "convinced atheists". As of 2012, the top 10 surveyed countries with people who viewed themselves as "convinced atheists" were China (47%), Japan (31%), the Czech Republic (30%), France (29%), South Korea (15%), Germany (15%), Netherlands (14%), Austria (10%), Iceland (10%), Australia (10%), and Ireland (10%). A 2012 study by the NORC found that East Germany had the highest percentage of atheists while Czech Republic had the second highest amount. The number of atheists per country is strongly correlated with the level of security for both the individual and society, with some exceptions.

=== Europe ===
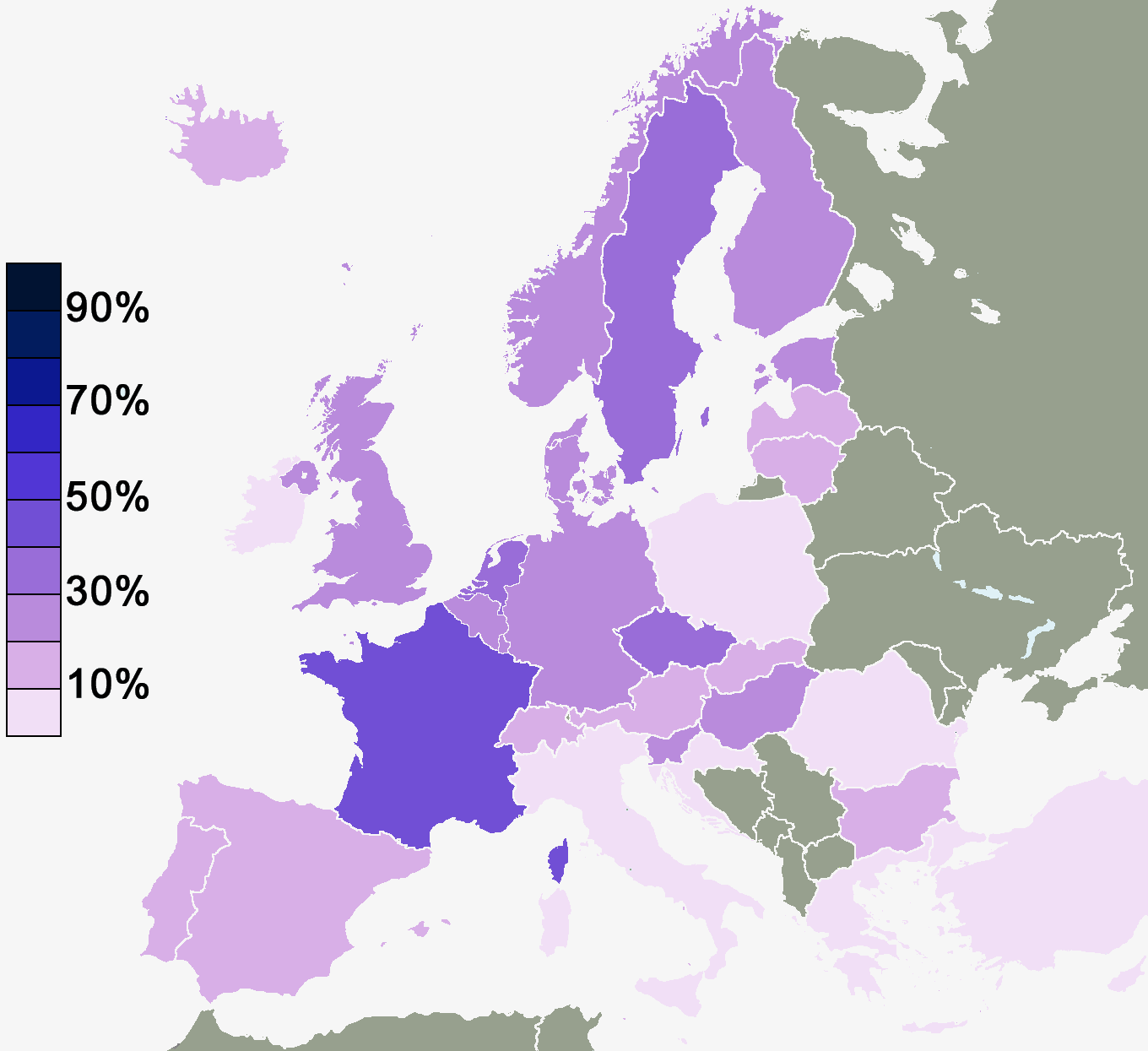
Percentage of people in various European countries who said: "I don't believe there is any sort of spirit, God or life force." (2010)

According to the 2010 Eurobarometer Poll, the percentage of those polled who agreed with the statement "you don't believe there is any sort of spirit, God or life force" varied from a high percentage in France (40%), Czech Republic (37%), Sweden (34%), Netherlands (30%), and Estonia (29%); medium-high percentage in Germany (27%), Belgium (27%), UK (25%); to very low in Poland (5%), Greece (4%), Cyprus (3%), Malta (2%), and Romania (1%), with the European Union as a whole at 20%. In a 2012 Eurobarometer poll on discrimination in the European Union, 16% of those polled considered themselves non-believers/agnostics, and 7% considered themselves atheists.

According to a Pew Research Center survey in 2012, about 18% of Europeans are religiously unaffiliated, including agnostics and atheists. According to the same survey, the religiously unaffiliated are the majority of the population only in two European countries: Czech Republic (75%) and Estonia (60%). Pew Research Centre's 2018 report found that the percentage who said "Do not believe in God" was 13% in Portugal, 21% in Italy, 31% in Spain, 26% in Ireland, 37% in Finland, 47% in Norway, 46% in Denmark, 53% in Netherlands, 60% in Sweden, 29% in Austria, 54% in Belgium, 36% in United Kingdom, 37% in France, 33% in Switzerland, and 36% in Germany.

=== Asia ===
There are three countries and one special administrative region of China or regions where the religiously unaffiliated make up a majority of the population: North Korea (71%), Japan (57%), Hong Kong (56%), and China (52%).

=== Australasia ===
According to the 2021 Australian Census, 38% of Australians have "no religion", a category that includes atheists. In a 2018 census, 48.2% of New Zealanders reported having no religion, up from 30% in 1991.

=== United States ===
Symbol of atheism endorsed by the Atheist Alliance International

According to the World Values Survey, 4.4% of Americans self-identified as atheists in 2014. However, the same survey showed that 11.1% of all respondents stated "no" when asked if they believed in God. According to a 2014 report by the Pew Research Center, 3.1% of the US adult population identify as atheist, up from 1.6% in 2007; and within the religiously unaffiliated (or "no religion") demographic, atheists made up 13.6%. According to the 2015 General Sociological Survey the number of atheists and agnostics in the US has remained relatively flat in the past 23 years since in 1991 only 2% identified as atheist and 4% identified as agnostic and in 2014 only 3% identified as atheists and 5% identified as agnostics.

According to the American Family Survey, 34% were found to be religiously unaffiliated in 2017 (23% "nothing in particular", 6% agnostic, 5% atheist). According to the Pew Research Center, in 2014, 22.8% of the American population does not identify with a religion, including atheists (3.1%) and agnostics (4%). According to a PRRI survey, 24% of the population is unaffiliated. Atheists and agnostics combined make up about a quarter of this unaffiliated demographic. According to a 2023 Pew Research Center study, 28% of Americans are religiously unaffiliated.

=== Arab world ===
In recent years, the profile of atheism has risen substantially in the Arab world. In major cities across the region, such as Cairo, atheists have been organizing in cafés and social media, despite regular crackdowns from authoritarian governments. A 2012 poll by Gallup International revealed that 5% of Saudis considered themselves to be "convinced atheists". However, very few young people in the Arab world have atheists in their circle of friends or acquaintances. According to one study, less than 1% did in Morocco, Egypt, Saudi Arabia, or Jordan; only 3% to 7% in the United Arab Emirates, Bahrain, Kuwait, and Palestine. When asked whether they have "seen or heard traces of atheism in [their] locality, community, and society" only about 3% to 8% responded yes in all the countries surveyed. The only exception was the UAE, with a percentage of 51%.

=== Attitudes toward atheism ===
Statistically, atheists are held in poor regard across the globe. Non-atheists seem to implicitly view atheists as prone to exhibit immoral behaviors. In addition, according to a 2016 Pew Research Center publication, 15% of French people, 45% of Americans, and 99% of Indonesians explicitly believe that a person must believe in God to be moral. Pew furthermore noted that, in a U.S. poll, atheists and Muslims tied for the lowest rating among the major religious demographics on a "feeling thermometer". Also, a study of religious college students found that they were more likely to perceive and interact with atheists negatively after considering their mortality, suggesting that these attitudes may be the result of death anxiety.

The annual Freedom of Thought Report, published by Humanists International, surveys legal and social restrictions affecting non-religious people worldwide and rates countries across several thematic categories.

=== Wealth, education, and reasoning style ===
Various studies have reported positive correlations between levels of education, wealth, and IQ with atheism. According to 2024 data from Pew Research Center, atheists in the United States are more likely to be white compared to the general U.S. population (77% vs 62%). In a 2008 study, researchers found intelligence to be negatively related to religious belief in Europe and the United States. In a sample of 137 countries, the correlation between national IQ and disbelief in God was found to be 0.60. According to evolutionary psychologist Nigel Barber, atheism blossoms in places where most people feel economically secure, particularly in the social democracies of Europe, as there is less uncertainty about the future with extensive social safety nets and better health care resulting in a greater quality of life and higher life expectancy. By contrast, in underdeveloped countries, there are far fewer atheists.

The relationship between atheism and IQ, while statistically significant, is not a large one, and the reason for the relationship is not fully understood. One hypothesis is that the negative relationship between IQ and religiosity is mediated by individual differences in nonconformity; in many countries, religious belief is a conformist choice, and there is evidence that more intelligent people are less likely to conform. Another theory is that people of higher IQ are more likely to engage in analytical reasoning, and that disbelief in religion results from the application of higher-level analytical reasoning to the assessment of religious claims.

In a 2017 study, it was shown that compared to religious individuals, atheists have higher reasoning capacities and this difference seemed to be unrelated to sociodemographic factors such as age, education and country of origin. In a 2015 study, researchers found that atheists score higher on cognitive reflection tests than theists, the authors wrote that "The fact that atheists score higher agrees with the literature showing that belief is an automatic manifestation of the mind and its default mode. Disbelieving seems to require deliberative cognitive ability." A 2016 study, in which 4 new studies were reported and a meta-analysis of all previous research on the topic was performed, found that self-identified atheists scored 18.7% higher than theists on the cognitive reflection test and there is a negative correlation between religiosity and analytical thinking. The authors note that recently "it has been argued that analytic thinkers are not actually less religious; rather, the putative association may be a result of religiosity typically being measured after analytic thinking (an order effect)", however, they state: "Our results indicate that the association between analytical thinking and religious disbelief is not caused by a simple order effect. There is good evidence that atheists and agnostics are more reflective than religious believers." The study defined reflectivity as personal judgement beyond intuition, analytical and scientific reasoning, and lower receptivity to absurd, illogical claims. This "analytic atheist" effect has also been found among academic philosophers, even when controlling for about a dozen potential confounds such as education.

Some studies do not detect this correlation between atheism and analytic thinking in all of the countries that they study, suggesting that the relationship between analytic thinking and atheism may depend on culture. There is also evidence that gender may be involved in what has been termed the analytic atheist effect; because men have been found more likely to endorse atheism, and men often perform slightly better on tests of analytic thinking, when not controlling for variables such as math anxiety, the correlation between atheism and analytic reasoning may be partly explained by whatever explains observed gender differences in analytic thinking.

== See also ==
- Antireligion – Opposition or hostility to religion
- Apatheism – Apathy toward the existence or non-existence of God
- Lists of atheists
- Outline of atheism
