= Barley (surname) =

Barley is an English surname. Notable people with the surname include:

- Bryan Barley (born 1960), English rugby union player
- Candace Barley (born 1991), American rugby player
- Connor Barley (born 2004), English rugby league player
- Harry Barley (1905–1958), English football player
- Henry Barley (disambiguation), multiple people
- Ivy Barley, Ghanaian entrepreneur
- Jack Barley (1887–1956), English cricketer
- John E. Barley (born 1945), American politician
- Katarina Barley (born 1968), German politician, former Federal Minister of Justice
- Les Barley (born 1967), American football player
- M. W. Barley (1909–1991), English historian and archaeologist
- Matthew Barley (born 1965), English cellist
- Nigel Barley (disambiguation), multiple people
- Scott Barley (born 1992), British filmmaker and artist
- Stephen R. Barley (born 1953), American organizational theorist
- Tom Barley (born 1987) British racing driver
- William Barley (died 1614), English bookseller and publisher

Fictional people

- Nathan Barley main character of the 2005 British sitcom of the same name
