= William Truelove =

Royal Canadian Navy officer

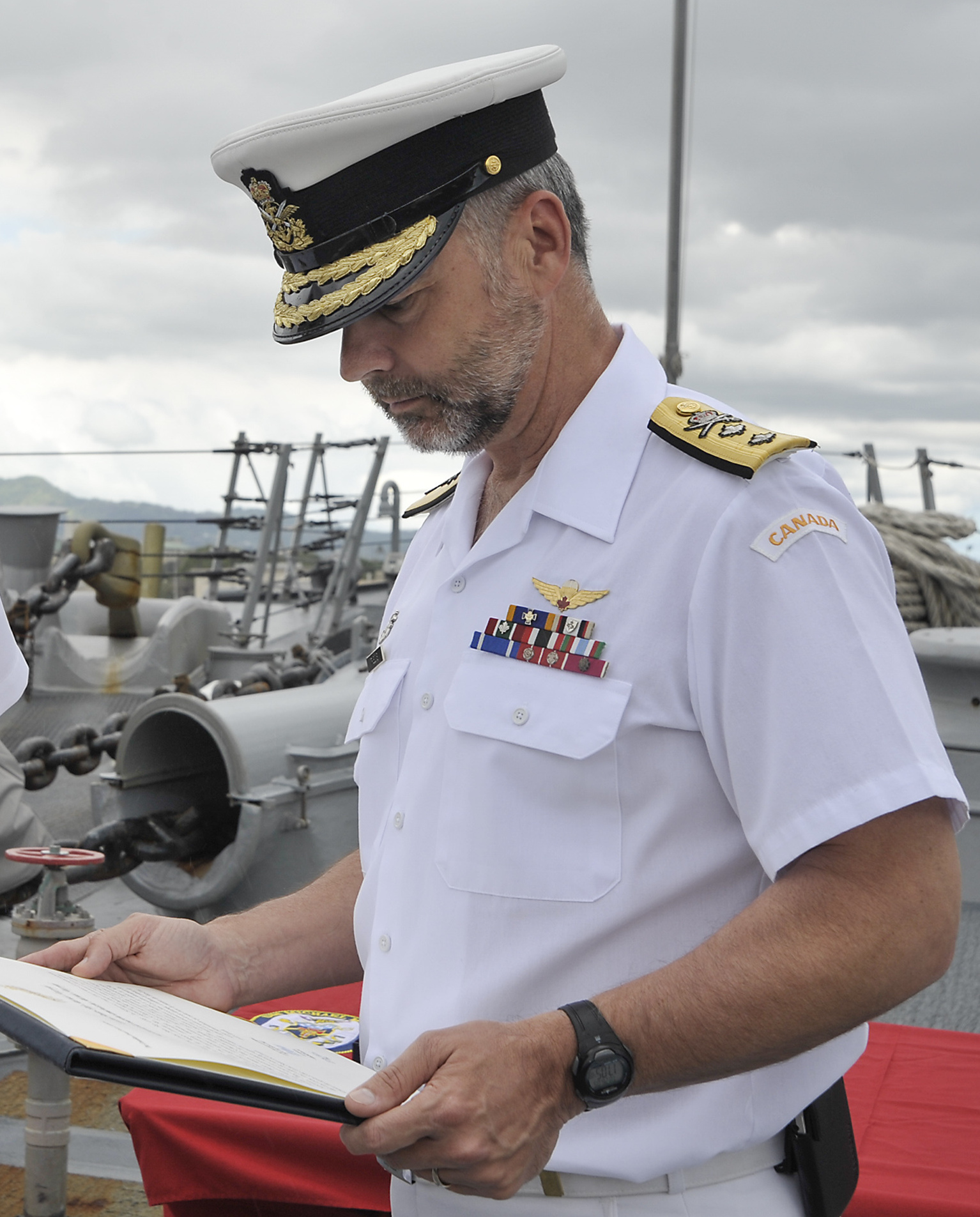
- Truelove in 2015
- Military career
- Allegiance: Canada
- Branch: Royal Canadian Navy
- Service years: 1981–2018
- Rank: Rear-Admiral
- Nickname: Bill
- Commands: Maritime Forces Pacific; Naval Officer Training Centre Venture; HMCS Regina
- Awards: Commander of the Order of Military Merit; Canadian Forces' Decoration

Rear-Admiral William Shaun Truelove CMM CD is a retired senior Royal Canadian Navy officer.

== Military service ==
He joined the Navy in 1981 and obtained a degree at Royal Roads Military College.

In 1998 he was appointed Executive Officer of HMCS Preserver before being appointed as Commanding Officer of HMCS Regina from 2001 to 2003 and the Naval Officer Training Centre until 2004.

He was promoted to Rear-Admiral in May 2012 and took command of Maritime Forces Pacific in June 2012. In 2015 he was appointed as Commander, Canadian Defence Liaison Council in Washington. In July 2018, he stepped down as defence attaché at the Embassy of Canada, Washington, D.C., and retired from the Canadian Armed Forces.

He was invested as an officer of the Order of Military Merit in 2009 and promoted to commander of the order in 2016.

== Awards and decorations ==
Truelove's personal awards and decorations include the following:

| Ribbon | Description | Notes |
| | Order of Military Merit (CMM) | Appointed Commander (CMM) on 23 October 2015; Appointed Officer (OMM) on 2 October 2007 |
| | South-West Asia Service Medal | with AFGHANISTAN Clasp |
| | General Campaign Star | South West Asia Ribbon; 1 Rotation Bars |
| | Special Service Medal | with NATO-OTAN Clasp |
| | Canadian Peacekeeping Service Medal | |
| | NATO Medal for the former Yugoslavia | with FORMER YUGOSLAVIA clasp |
| | Canadian Forces' Decoration (CD) | with two Clasp for 32 years of services |
| | Legion of Merit | 1st Decoration awarded on 29 September 2007; 2nd Decoration awarded on 27 December 2014; Officer level; (United States) |

- He was a qualified Paratrooper and as such wore the Canadian Forces Jump Wings

Military offices
| Preceded by Nigel Greenwood | Commander, Maritime Forces Pacific; June 2012– 14 July 2015 | Succeeded by Gilles Couturier |
