= Niall =

- Pronunciation: /niːl/ Irish: [n̠ʲiəl̪ˠ]
- Gender: Male

Origin
- Language: Irish
- Meaning: Unknown
- Region of origin: Ireland

Other names
- Related names: Neil; Nigel; Niallán (diminutive)

Niall is a male given name of Irish origin. The original meaning of the name is unknown, but popular modern sources have suggested that it means "champion" (derived from the Old Irish word niadh). According to John Ryan, Professor of Early and Medieval History at University College Dublin, Niall "seems to be so ancient that its meaning was lost before records began."

== Notable people with the name Niall ==
=== Medieval times ===
- Niall of the Nine Hostages, High King of Ireland who lived in the early-to-mid 5th century AD
- Niall Caille, High King of Ireland in the 9th century AD

=== Modern times ===
- Niall Carolan (born 2002), Irish Gaelic footballer
- Niall Ferguson (born 1964), Historian and the Laurence A. Tisch professor of history at Harvard University
- Niall Horan (born 1993), a member of the British-Irish boy band One Direction
- Niall Mackenzie (born 1961), Scottish former professional motorcycle road racer
- Niall Matter (born 1980), Canadian actor
- Niall McCready, Irish Gaelic footballer
- Niall McGinn (born 1987), Northern Irish footballer
- Niall Moran (born 1983), Irish hurler
- Niall O'Brien (born 1981), Irish cricketer
- Niall O'Donnell (born 1998), Irish Gaelic footballer
- Niall Quinn (born 1966), Irish former international footballer and chairman of the English club Sunderland A.F.C.
- Niall Treacy (born 2000), British short-track speed skater

=== As a surname ===
- Brenda Niall (born 1930), Australian writer, aunt of Jake and Richard
- Jake Niall, Australian sports journalist, cousin of Richard
- Richard Niall, Australian judge

=== Fictional characters ===
- Niall, a Circle Mage from Dragon Age: Origins
- Hunter Niall from Sweep
- Niall Brigant from The Southern Vampire Mysteries
- Niall MacDonnell from the Honorverse
- Niall Rafferty from Hollyoaks
- Niall from Xenoblade Chronicles 2
- Pedron Niall from The Wheel of Time
- Commander Niall from Elden Ring

== See also ==
- List of Irish language given names
- Neil, Nigel, probable cognates through Norse, medieval Latin and Anglo-Norman borrowings
