= Nigel Hall =

Nigel Hall may refer to:

- Nigel Hall (rugby union) (born 1978), New Zealand rugby union player
- Nigel Hall (sculptor) (born 1943), English sculptor and draughtsman
- Nigel Hall (musician) (born 1981), American funk keyboardist
