= Gilles Couturier =

Military officer

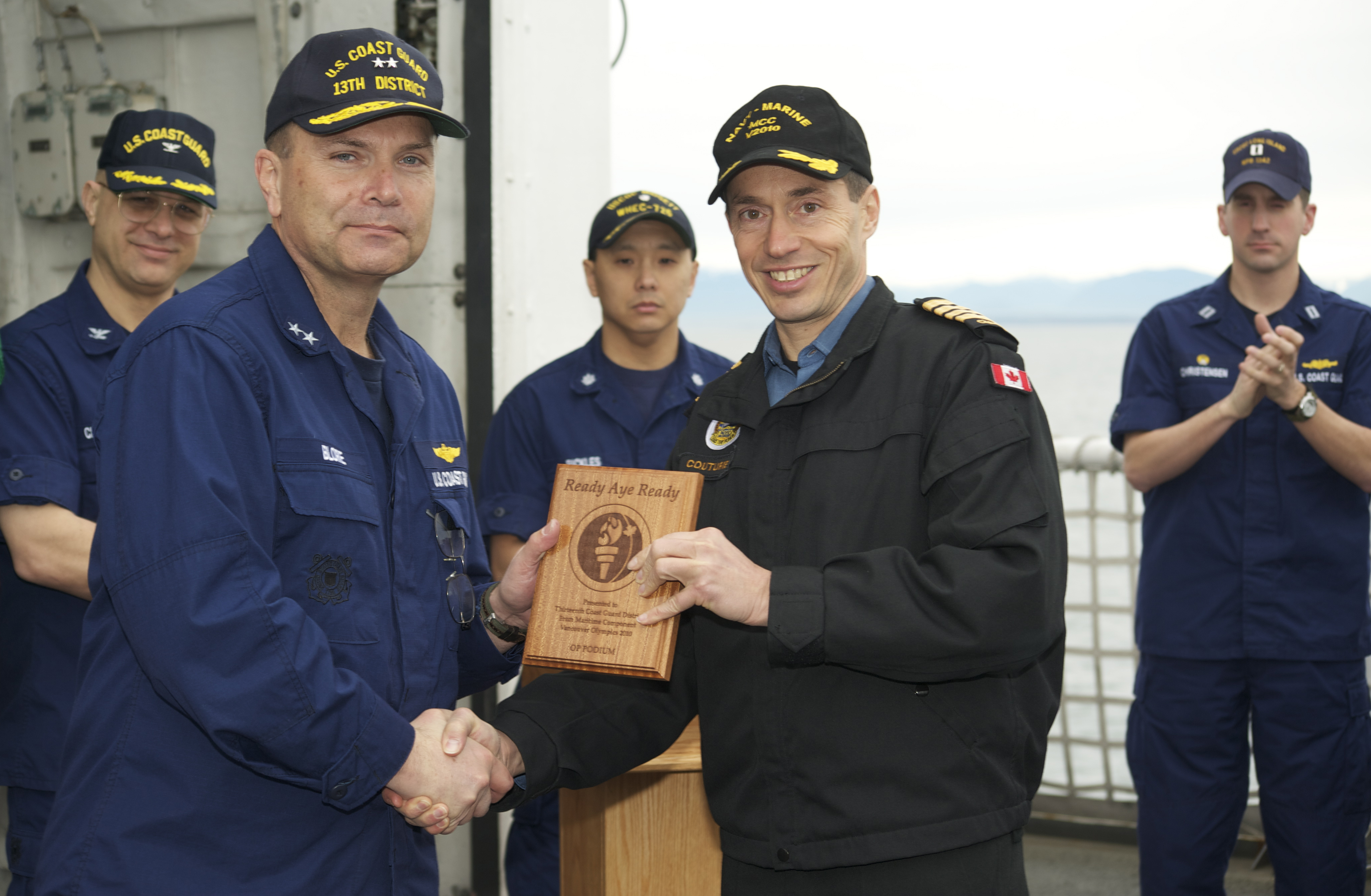
- Couturier in 2010
- Born: Ottawa, Ontario, Canada
- Military career
- Allegiance: Canada
- Branch: Royal Canadian Navy
- Service years: 1983–2018
- Rank: Rear-admiral
- Commands: Maritime Forces Pacific; HMCS Fredericton
- Awards: Commander of the Order of Military Merit; Canadian Forces' Decoration

Rear-Admiral Joseph Pierre Gilles Couturier CMM CD is a Royal Canadian Navy officer.

He joined the navy in 1983. He served as Commanding officer of HMCS Fredericton from 2005 to 2007. Following this assignment, he was posted to Ottawa as an executive assistant to the Chief of the Defence Staff. After the tour in Ottawa, he was appointed commander of Maritime Operations Group Four.

He assumed command of Maritime Forces Pacific/Joint Task Force Pacific on 14 July 2015. In January 2016 it was announced that he would be appointed Deputy Commander of the Navy.

He was invested as an officer of the Order of Military Merit in 2012 and promoted to commander of the order in 2017.

In 2018, he joined Levio Consulting, a Canadian IT and Business consulting firm as its Chief Operating Officer (COO).

In 2020 he joined Federal Fleet Services as Chief Executive Officer (CEO).

== Awards and decorations ==
Couturier's personal awards and decorations include the following:

Ribbon	Description	Notes
	Order of Military Merit (CMM)	Appointed Commander (CMM) on 22 September 2016; Appointed Officer (OMM) on 23 September 2011
	Operational Service Medal (Canada)	Awarded for service in expedition missions
	Special Service Medal	with NATO-OTAN Clasp
	Canadian Forces' Decoration (CD)	with two Clasp for 32 years of services
	Legion of Merit	Decoration awarded on 28 February 2015; Officer level; (United States)

CDS Commendation
Command Commendation

Military offices
Preceded by Ron Lloyd	Deputy Commander of the Royal Canadian Navy; 2016-	Incumbent
Preceded by William Truelove	Commander, Maritime Forces Pacific; 14 July 2015-2016	Succeeded by Art McDonald
