= Nigel Greenwood =

Nigel Greenwood may refer to:

- Nigel Greenwood (footballer) (born 1966), English former professional footballer
- Nigel Greenwood (art dealer) (1941–2004), British art dealer
- Nigel Greenwood (admiral), Royal Canadian retired Navy officer
