= Nigel Walker =

Nigel Walker may refer to:

- Nigel Walker (athlete) (born 1963), Welsh runner and rugby union player
- Nigel Walker (criminologist) (1917–2014), English criminologist
- Nigel Walker (footballer) (1959–2014), English footballer
