= Nigel Savery =

British molecular biologist

Nigel Savery is an English molecular biologist. He is currently a Professor of Molecular Biology and the Head of the School of Biochemistry at the University of Bristol.

During his time researching and lecturing at the University of Bristol, Savery has made significant contributions to the field of transcription and DNA-damage recognition and repair.

Savery's group have made advances in the study of the E. coli protein MFD, which is a transcription-repair coupling factor involved in the repair of damaged DNA.

== Education ==
Savery attended the University of Birmingham, where he earned a Bachelor's degree in Biochemistry in 1988, followed by a doctorate in 1993.
