= Nigel Hall (rugby union) =

NZ rugby union player

- Born: 23 November 1978 (age 47) Westport, New Zealand
- Height: 1.87 m (6 ft 1 1/2 in)
- Weight: 114 kg (251 lb; 18.0 st)

Rugby union career
- Position: Prop
Senior career
Years	Team	Apps	(Points)
2008–2011	Newport GD	28	(0)

Nigel Hall (born 23 November 1978 in Westport, New Zealand) is a New Zealand rugby union player. A prop forward, Hall played for Otago before joining Nottingham. In December 2008 he joined Newport Gwent Dragons. Hall retired from rugby in October 2011 due to injury.
