= Nigel Davies =

Nigel Davies may refer to:

- Nigel Davies (historian) (1920–2004), British historian and anthropologist
- Justin de Villeneuve (Nigel Jonathan(?) Davies), British modelling agent and celebrity of the 1960s
- Nigel Davies (chess player) (born 1960), English chess grandmaster
- Nigel Davies (rugby union) (born 1965), Welsh rugby player and coach

== See also ==
- Nigel Twiston-Davies (born 1957), British racehorse trainer
