= Nigel Stock =

Nigel Stock may refer to:

- Nigel Stock (actor) (1919–1986), British actor
- Nigel Stock (bishop) (born 1950), retired Church of England bishop; former Bishop of St Edmundsbury and Ipswich, and at Lambeth
