= Nigella (disambiguation) =

Nigella may refer to:

== People ==
- Nigella Lawson, English food writer
- Nigella Saunders, Jamaican badminton player

== Plants ==
- Nigella, a genus of about 14 species of annual plants in the family Ranunculaceae, particularly
  - Nigella sativa, the seeds of which are used as a culinary spice
  - Nigella damascena, (Love-in-a-mist), grown in gardens as an ornamental plant
