= Barley Bree =

Northern Irish-Canadian band

- Origin: Northern Ireland
- Years active: 1973–1995
- Labels: Shanachie Records
- Members: Tom Sweeney; Jimmy Sweeney; P.V. O'Donnell; Brian Doherty; Seamus O'Hagan; Nicky Bryson

Barley Bree was a Northern Irish-Canadian band active from 1973 to 1995. It was formed in Northern Ireland in 1973, by Nicky Bryson, Buncrana fiddler P.V. O'Donnell, Seamus O'Hagan (Cookstown), and Jimmy Sweeney, a nephew of Tommy Makem and grandson of Traditional singer Sarah Makem. In 1977, all except Bryson moved to Nova Scotia; Bryson was replaced by Tom Sweeney. In 1979, O'Hagan returned to Northern Ireland and the band continued on as a trio until 1995, when Tom Sweeney left to pursue a solo career.

Barley Bree widely toured North America and released eight successful albums. They also fronted a weekly television series called Barley Bree which lasted for two years. After breaking up, they reunited several times at the Milwaukee Irish Fest.

Barley Bree appeared with Tommy Makem and Cherish the Ladies on the 1992 CD and video, Tommy Makem and Friends in Concert.

Nova Scotia musician Brian Doherty (of Evans & Doherty) joined the band as their recording bass player in 1985. In 2012, Kevin Evans, Doherty and Jimmy Sweeney released the album Sailing Ships And Sailing Men, a companion to a one-hour radio show they hosted on CBC’s Atlantic Airwaves. Jimmy Sweeney still lives and performs in Nova Scotia. In 1998, he released the album Come Listen Awhile.

P.V. O'Donnell settled in Manchester, Connecticut, and worked as a fiddle instructor, played with the Hartford Symphony Orchestra, recorded two albums and continued to perform and tour. He died of brain cancer on January 29, 2011.

Tom Sweeney returned to Omagh, Northern Ireland, and carved out a successful career as a solo folk singer. He has released several albums including Daisy a Day and Poems of Ireland, along with several very popular children's albums. In 1998, he was invited to the White House to perform for then President Bill Clinton at the annual St.Patrick's day celebrations. To an audience which included John Hume, David Trimble and Gerry Adams, Tom performed a song he had written during the height of Northern Ireland's troubles entitled "Anthem for the Children".

== Discography ==
Barley Bree	1982	Dolphin Records
Barley Bree Live	1984	Rego
Castles in the Air	1985	Shanachie Records
No Man's Land	1986	Shanachie Records
Speak Up for Old Ireland	1987	Shanachie Records
Anthem for the Children	1992	Shanachie Records
Love is Teasing	1993	Shanachie Records
The Best of Barley Bree	1995	Shanachie Records
