= Nigel Burgess =

Nigel Burgess may refer to:

- Nigel Burgess (footballer) (born 1981), Bermudian international footballer who also played rugby union for Bermuda
- Nigel Burgess (yachtsman) (1942–1992), British yachtsman
