= Nigel Herring =

Australian Anglican priest

Nigel Denzil Herring (1877–1972) was an Anglican priest in the first two-thirds of the 20th century.

Herring was educated at Trinity College, Melbourne. He was ordained deacon in 1900, and priest in 1885. He served curacies at Kyneton and Werribee. He held incumbencies at Broken Hill, Shepparton and Benalla. He was Archdeacon of Bendigo from 1928 to 1949; and Archdeacon of Kyneton from 1949 to 1964.
