= Nigel Paul =

Nigel Paul may refer to:

- Nigel Paul (cricketer) (1933–2022), English cricketer and golfer
- Nigel Paul (boxer) (born 1989), boxer from Trinidad and Tobago
- Nigel Paul Villarete (born 1962), Filipino civil engineer and urban planner
