= Nigel Wright =

Nigel Wright may refer to:

- Nigel Wright (boxer) (born 1979), English boxer
- Nigel Wright (record producer) (born 1955), English record producer
- Nigel Wright (rugby league) (born 1973), English rugby league footballer fl. 1990s and 2000s
- Nigel G. Wright (born 1949), British Baptist theologian
- Nigel S. Wright (1963-2025), Canadian businessman and lawyer, former Chief of Staff in the Canadian Prime Minister's Office
- Nigel Wright (musician) (born 1993), American singer-songwriter and musician
- Nigel Wright, perpetrator of the Tesco blackmail plot
