= Nigel Loring =

Nigel Loring may refer to:

- Sir Neil Loring (1320–1386), also Nigel, medieval English soldier and diplomat
- Sir Nigel Loring (surgeon) (1896–1979), apothecary to British royalty
- Sir Nigel Loring, a character from Sir Nigel and The White Company
