= Nigel Baker (cricketer) =

English cricketer

Nigel Ernest Westby Baker (9 January 1914 – 10 March 1968) was an English first-class cricketer active from 1934 to 1935 who played for Cambridge University and Berkshire. He was born in Westminster and died in Balcombe. He appeared in three first-class matches.
