= Nigel Moore =

Nigel Moore may refer to:

- Nigel Moore (racing driver) (born 1992), British racing driver
- Nigel Moore (cricketer) (1930–2003), English cricketer
- Nigel Moore (basketball) (born 1981), American basketball player
