= Nigel Linge =

British professor of telecommunications

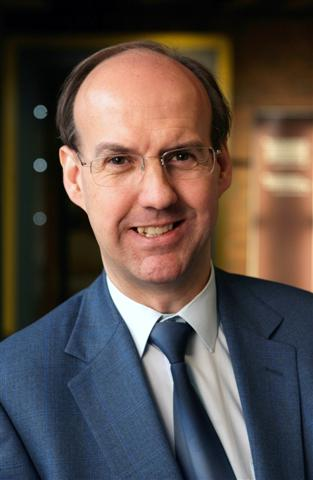
Nigel Linge, 2007

Nigel Linge FBCS FIET FHEA is Professor of Telecommunications at the University of Salford. He is a specialist in computer networking and telecommunications heritage.

== Early life ==
Linge was educated at Wolsingham Comprehensive School and then at the University of Salford where he obtained a degree in Electronics in 1983. He subsequently completed his PhD there in 1987 for a thesis on the subject of "The interconnection of local area networks using bridges".

== Career ==
Linge is Professor of Telecommunications at the University of Salford. He is a specialist in computer networking and telecommunications heritage about which he has written two books with Andy Sutton. He is a Chartered Engineer and was elected Fellow of the Institution of Engineering and Technology, Fellow of the British Computer Society, and Fellow of the Higher Education Academy.

== Selected publications ==
- 30 Years of Mobile Phones in the UK. Amberley Publishing, 2015. (With Andy Sutton) ISBN 978-1445651088
- The British Phonebox. Amberley Publishing, 2017. (With Andy Sutton) ISBN 978-1445663081
