= Nigel Hemming =

British artist

Nigel Hemming is a British artist, specialising in animal portraits and artwork. He was born in 1957 in Staffordshire. Initially a painter of birds, it was his paintings of dogs which became the more famous.

He has been described as "one of the UK’s most famous canine artists" and one of the most successful.

== Awards and notable works ==
- 1996 - Published Artist of the Year by the Fine Art Trade Guild.
