= Nigel Hollis =

English author (born 1958)

Nigel Hollis (born 1958) is an English author, analyst, researcher, speaker and commentator on marketing. He is the author of The Global Brand: How to Create and Develop Lasting Brand Value in the World Market, published by Palgrave Macmillan in 2008, and is executive vice president of the market research agency Millward Brown.

== Book contributions ==
Hollis contributed a chapter to Martin Lindstrom's 2005 book BRAND Sense, in which Lindstrom described research designed by Hollis and conducted by Millward Brown specifically for the book. Hollis also contributed a comparable chapter to Lindstrom's 2003 book BRANDchild.

== HotWired advertisement effectiveness study ==
Designed by Rex Briggs, then head of research at HotWired, with the technical support of HotWired staff including Joshua Grossnickle and Oliver Raskin, HotWired used some of Millward Brown measurement scales, but the methodology differed significantly from brand tracking, for which Millward Brown was known. Hollis was instrumental in having HotWired to work with Millward Brown, and this 1996 landmark study of online advertising, proving that banner advertisements could have a branding effect before clickthrough is noted as the first study of its kind.

== Blog ==
Hollis regularly publishes a blog called "Straight Talk with Nigel Hollis".
