= Nigel Chapman =

Nigel Chapman may refer to:

- Nigel Chapman (mayor), mayor of Colchester
- Nigel Chapman (cricketer) (born 1945), English cricketer
