= Nigel Johnson =

Nigel Johnson can refer to:

- Nigel Johnson (cricketer) (born 1952), Barbadian cricketer
- Nigel Johnson (footballer) (born 1964), English footballer
- Nigel Johnson (swimmer) (born 1953), British Olympic swimmer
