= Theistic naturalism =

Religious philosophy

Theistic naturalism is a theologically based belief system within philosophy which rejects divine intervention but maintains theism.

It is different from traditional or classical theism. Theistic naturalists think evolution and naturalism can be in tune with religious beliefs, such as Christianity.

According to Sarah Lane Ritchie of the University of Edinburgh, the term "theistic naturalism" was first used by Dutch philosopher Willem Drees. Drees used the term to describe "a scheme of primary and secondary causes, with the transcendent realm giving effectiveness and reality to the laws of nature and the material world governed by them." This view is, however, is not universally seen as compatible with naturalism.

== Criticism ==
Theistic naturalism has been criticized by some as expanding the borders of naturalism to the point that "anything goes." Jeffrey Koperski, a professor of philosophy at Saginaw Valley State University, for example, claimed that theistic naturalism sounds like an "oxymoron" and that "naturalism and theism are incompatible".

Steven D. Schafersman, a geologist, also wrote about the perceived incompatibility of the two ideas. In a paper presented at the Conference on Naturalism, Theism and the Scientific Enterprise, he stated:

"Theistic naturalists must believe in naturalism to methodologically assume or adopt it in science, and they cannot logically maintain a belief in supernaturalism at the same time unless they maintain that there is absolutely no connection at all between the natural and supernatural worlds. But this is something no supernaturalist maintains. Even the most naturalistic theistic naturalist—a deist who claims that God is the ultimate Creator of the universe, but that everything after that singular event is natural and operates by natural causes—believes in a supernatural origin of the universe. But ontological naturalism makes no exception for the origin of the universe." [Emphasis in original.]

== Notable theistic naturalists ==
- Arthur Peacocke
- John B. Cobb
