= Henry Barley (disambiguation) =

Henry Barley (1487–1529) was an English politician.

Henry Barley may also refer to:

- Henry Barley, High Sheriff of Essex in 1466
- Sir Henry Barley, (fl. 1876) in Colony of Natal
