= Nigel Coates =

Nigel Coates is the name of:

- Nigel Coates (admiral) (1959–2010), Australian admiral
- Nigel Coates (architect) (born 1949), British architect
