= Nigel Edwards =

Nigel Edwards may refer to:

- Nigel Edwards (footballer) (born 1950), Welsh footballer
- Nigel Edwards (golfer) (born 1968), Welsh golfer
- Nigel Edwards (health), health policy researcher
