= Nigel Richards (disambiguation) =

Nigel Richards (born 1967) is a New Zealand-Malaysian Scrabble player.

Nigel Richards may also refer to:

- Nigel Richards (actor), English actor and singer
- Nigel Richards (British Army officer) (1945–2019), British general
