= Nigel Barley =

Nigel Barley may refer to:

- Nigel Barley (anthropologist) (born 1947), British anthropology writer
- Nigel Barley (cyclist) (born 1974), Australian Paralympic cyclist
