= Nigel Greenwood (admiral) =

British-Canadian naval officer

- Born: London, United Kingdom
- Military career
- Allegiance: Canada
- Branch: Royal Canadian Navy
- Service years: 1975–2012
- Rank: Rear-Admiral
- Commands: Maritime Forces Pacific; Assistant Chief of Maritime Staff
- Awards: Commander of the Order of Military Merit; Canadian Forces' Decoration

Rear Admiral Nigel Greenwood CMM CD (born London, UK) is a retired Royal Canadian Navy officer. His last posting was as Commander Maritime Forces Pacific.

He graduated from Royal Roads Military College.

He also served as Assistant Chief of Maritime Staff (now known as Deputy Commander of the Royal Canadian Navy)

== Awards and decorations ==
Greenwood's personal awards and decorations include the following:

| Ribbon | Description | Notes |
| | Order of Military Merit (CMM) | Appointed Commander (CMM) on 27 October 2010; Appointed Officer (OMM) on 29 September 2004 |
| | Special Service Medal | with NATO-OTAN Clasp |
| | Canadian Forces' Decoration (CD) | with two Clasp for 32 years of services |

Command Commendation
