= Nigel Barber =

American biopsychologist and author (born 1955)

- Born: November 7, 1955 (age 70); Tullamore, Ireland
- Education: Hunter College (Ph.D., 1989)
- Spouse: Trudy Callaghan (m. 1979)
- Children: David
- Scientific career
- Fields: Biopsychology, evolutionary psychology
- Workplaces: Bemidji State University, Birmingham-Southern College
- Thesis: Proximate factors in the control of sandbathing in the chinchilla (Chinchilla laniger) (1989)
- Doctoral advisor: Robert L. Thompson

Nigel William Thomas Barber (born November 7, 1955) is an Irish-born American biopsychologist and author.

== Biography ==
Barber emigrated from his native Ireland to the United States in 1982. He received his Ph.D. in biopsychology from Hunter College of the City University of New York in 1989, after which he taught at Bemidji State University as an instructor for one year, and then at Birmingham-Southern College as an assistant professor.

== Research ==
Barber's research focuses on various subjects in the fields of biopsychology and evolutionary psychology. These include the evolution of altruism, the reasons that men grow facial hair, and the reasons people believe in religion, which he holds pertain to economic adversity.

== Publications ==
=== Books ===
- (1998). Parenting: Roles, Styles and Outcomes. Nova Science Publisher, Inc. ISBN 1-56072-573-7
- (2000). Why Parents Matter: Parental Investment and Child Outcomes. Bergin & Garvey ISBN 0-89789-725-0
- (2002). The Science of Romance: Secrets of the Sexual Brain. ISBN 1-57392-970-0
- (2002). Encyclopedia of Ethics in Science and Technology. Facts on File, Inc. ISBN 0-8160-4314-0
- (2004). Kindness in a Cruel World. Prometheus Books. ISBN 1-59102-228-2
- (2008). The Myth of Culture. Cambridge Scholars Publishing. ISBN 1-84718-619-X
- (2012). Why Atheism Will Replace Religion. Kindle (ebook) ASIN B00886ZSJ6
- (2020). Evolution in the Here and Now. Prometheus Books. ISBN 978-1-63388-618-6, 978-1-63388-619-3
- (2021). The Human Beast Volume II... Evolution and the Modern World. ISBN 978-0-9855691-4-3
- (2021). The Human Beast Volume I... Through the Lens of Evolution. ISBN 978-0-9855691-2-9
- (2022). The Restless Species: Causes and Environmental Costs of Human Adaptive Success. ISBN 979-835600-7095
- (2022). The Human Beast Volume III... Restless People on a Troubled Planet. ISBN 978-0-9855691-7-4

=== Selected articles ===
- Barber, N. (1991). "Play and Energy Regulation in Mammals." The Quarterly Review of Biology, 66(2), pages 129–147. JSTOR 2830228
- Barber, N. (1995). "The evolutionary psychology of physical attractiveness". Ethology and Sociobiology, 16, pages 395–424. doi:10.1016/0162-3095(95)00068-2
- Barber, N. (1998). "The role of reproductive strategies in academic attainment". Sex Roles, 38, pages 313–323. doi:10.1023/A:1018745419124
- Barber N. (1998). "Secular changes in standards of bodily attractiveness in women: tests of a reproductive model". The International journal of eating disorders, 23(4), pages 449–453. doi:10.1002/(sici)1098-108x(199805)23:4<449::aid-eat14>3.0.co;2-r
- Barber, N. (1998). "Ecological and Psychosocial Correlates of Male Homosexuality". Journal of Cross-Cultural Psychology, 29(3), pages 387–401. https://www.deepdyve.com/lp/sage/ecological-and-psychosocial-correlates-of-male-homosexuality-gg0LYh9ZAl?key=sage
- Barber. (1998). "Sex differences in disposition towards kin, security of adult attachment, and sociosexuality as a function of parental divorce". Evolution and Human Behavior, 19(2), pages 125–132. doi:10.1016/S1090-5138(98)00004-X
- Barber, N. (1999). "Women's dress fashions as a function of reproductive strategy". Sex Roles, 40(5–6), pages 459–471. doi:10.1023/A:1018823727012
- Barber, N. (2000). "The sex ratio as a predictor of cross-national variation in violent crime". Cross-Cultural Research, 34(3), pages 264–282. doi:10.1177/106939710003400304
- Barber, N. (2001). "Mustache Fashion Covaries with a Good Marriage Market for Women". Journal of Nonverbal Behavior, 25, pages 261–272. doi:10.1023/A:1012515505895
- Barber, N. (2003). "Paternal investment prospects and cross-national differences in single parenthood". Cross-Cultural Research, 37(2), pages 163–177. doi:10.1177/1069397103037002001
- Barber, N. (2003). "Divorce and reduced economic and emotional interdependence: A cross-national study". Journal of Divorce and Remarriage, 39, pages 113–124. doi:10.1300/J087v39n03_06
- Barber, N. (2004). "Single Parenthood as a Predictor of Cross-National Variation in Violent Crime". Cross-Cultural Research, 38(4), pages 343–358. doi:10.1177/1069397104267479
- Barber, Nigel. (2005). "Evolutionary Explanations for Societal Differences in Single Parenthood". Evolutionary Psychology. 3. doi:10.1177/147470490500300111
- Barber, N. (2005). "Educational and ecological correlates of IQ: A cross-national investigation". Intelligence, 33(3), pages 273–284. doi:10.1016/j.intell.2005.01.001
- Barber, N. (2006). "Why is violent crime so common in the Americas?" Aggressive Behavior, 32(5), pages 442–450. doi:10.1002/ab.20144
- Barber, N. (2006). "Is the Effect of National Wealth on Academic Achievement Mediated by Mass Media and Computers?" Cross-Cultural Research, 40(2), pages 130–151. doi:10.1177/1069397105277602
- Barber, N. (2007). "Evolutionary Explanations for Societal Differences and Historical Change in Violent Crime and Single Parenthood". Cross-Cultural Research, 41(2), pages 123–148. doi:10.1177/1069397106298926
- Barber, N. (2008). "Explaining Cross-National Differences in Polygyny Intensity: Resource-Defense, Sex Ratio, and Infectious Diseases". Cross-Cultural Research, 42(2), pages 103–117. doi:10.1177/1069397108314587
- Barber, N. (2008). "Cross-National Variation in the Motivation for Uncommitted Sex: The Role of Disease and Social Risks". Evolutionary Psychology. doi:10.1177/147470490800600203
- Barber, N. (2009). "Countries with fewer males have more violent crime: marriage markets and mating aggression". Aggressive behavior, 35(1), pages 49–56. doi:10.1002/ab.20291
- Barber, N. (2010). "Explaining cross-national differences in fertility: A comparative approach to the demographic shift". Cross-Cultural Research, 44, pages 3–22.
- Barber, N. (2015). "Why behavior matches ecology: Adaptive variation as a novel solution". Cross-Cultural Research, 49(1), pages 57–89. doi:10.1177/1069397114536129
- Barber, N. (2017). "Creative productivity and marriage markets: Mating effort and career striving as rival hypotheses". Journal of Genius and Eminence, 2, pages 32–44. doi:10.18536/jge.2017.04.02.01.04
- Barber, N. (2018). "Cross-national variation in attitudes to premarital sex: Economic development, disease risk, and marriage strength". Cross-Cultural Research, 52, pages 259–273. doi:10.1177/1069397117718143
