= Neale (surname) =

Neale is a surname, and may refer to

- Bill Neale, Canadian figure skater
- Charles Neale (1751–1823), American Jesuit
- Charles Neale, English footballer
- Cornelius Neale, English clergyman
- Douglas Neale, Scottish electric car maker (1895)
- Duncan Neale (born 1939), English footballer
- Earle "Greasy" Neale, American football coach
- Edgar Neale, New Zealand politician
- Edmund Neale, Poet
- Edward St. John Neale, Lieutenant-Colonel and British representative in Japan (1862–1863)
- Edward Vansittart Neale, British Christian Socialist
- Emma Neale, New Zealand novelist and poet
- Eric Neale, British car designer
- Francis Neale, American Jesuit
- George Neale (1869–1915), English cricketer and army officer
- Gerry Neale (1941–2015), British politician
- Greasy Neale, American football and baseball player and coach
- Harry Neale, Canadian broadcaster
- Sir Harry Burrard-Neale, 2nd Baronet, British navy officer and politician
- Haydain Neale, Canadian singer
- Helen Neale-May, South African politician
- J. Neale, Hampshire cricketer
- Jack Neale, English footballer
- James Neale (1615–1684), English migrant to Maryland
- Joe Neale, American baseball player
- John Neale (disambiguation)
- Keith Neale, English footballer
- Kevin Neale, Australian rules footballer
- Lachie Neale (born 1993), Australian rules footballer
- Leonard Neale, American bishop
- Liam Neale, English rugby union player
- Mark Neale, British documentary and film director
- Michael Neale, British behavior geneticist
- Nathaniel Neale, New Zealand Rugby League player
- Orville Neale, Virginia Tech football coach
- Paddy Neale, Canadian politician
- Peter Neale, English footballer
- Phil Neale, English cricketer
- Raphael Neale, American politician
- Robbie Neale, Canadian ice hockey player
- Robert Neale, American pilot
- Robert E. Neale, American paper folder
- Stan Neale (1894–1918), Australian rules footballer
- Stephen Neale, American philosopher
- Thomas Neale (1641–1699), British founder of the North American Postal Service
- Tom Neale, New Zealand lone occupant of Suwarrow
- Walter Neale (c1600–1639), British explorer and Colonial administrator
- William Neale (disambiguation)

== See also ==
- Kneale
- Neale (disambiguation)
- Neele
- Neil
- Neal (disambiguation)
- O'Neill (surname)
