= Nil =

Nil often refers to the number zero.

Nil or NIL may also refer to:

== Acronyms ==
- NIL (programming language), an implementation of the Lisp programming language
- Name, image and likeness, a set of rules for American college athletes to receive compensation
- Nanoimprint lithography, a method of fabricating nanometer scale patterns
- Nomina im Indogermanischen Lexikon ("Nominals in the Indo-European Lexicon"), an etymological dictionary
- North Island line, a proposed extension railway of Hong Kong

== Music ==
- Nil (band), a Japanese rock band
- The Nils, a Canadian punk rock band
- Non-Intentional Lifeform, an Australian hard rock band (1995–98)
- Nil (album), a 2006 album released by The Gazette
- "Nil", a song by Canadian punk band Gob

== People ==
- Nil (given name), a list of people with the given name
  - Nils (disambiguation), a list of people, animals, and fictional characters with a similar name
- Nil (surname), a list of people with the surname

== Places ==
- Nil (Iraq)
- Nil, Iran
- Nil River (Guatemala)

== Other ==
- Nil (cigarette), a brand of cigarette
- Nil: A Land Beyond Belief, a 2005 graphic novel
- Nil in the Indian numbering system
- Nil ideal, a mathematical concept in ring theory
- Null pointer (sometimes written NULL, nil, or None), used in computer programming for an uninitialized, undefined, empty, or meaningless value
- Jednostka Wojskowa Nil or NIL, a Polish commando unit, part of The Polish Special Forces (Wojska Specjalne)

== See also ==
- Names for the number 0 in English
- Neel (disambiguation)
- Null (disambiguation)
