= Ammachiveedu Murti Temple =

Hindu temple in Kerala, India

- Ammachiveedu Muhurthi Temple, Thangassery, Kollam, Kerala

Religion
- Affiliation: Hinduism
- District: Kollam
- Deity: Adi Parashakti
- Festival: Dhanu festival
- Ecclesiastical or organizational status: Private

Location
- Location: Thangassery
- State: Kerala
- Country: India
- Interactive map of Ammachiveedu Murti Temple
- Coordinates: 8°53′18.0″N 76°34′23.2″E

Architecture
- Type: Architecture of Kerala
- Founder: Ammachiveedu Family
- Established: 15th Century
- Temples: Two (Temple and Kavu)

Ammachiveedu Murti Temple is a Hindu temple located in Tangasseri, Kollam in the Indian state of Kerala. This ancient temple is visited by devotees irrespective of their caste and religion. The temple stands out in that it has no idol for its titular deity.

== Legend ==
No historical records are available regarding the temple's origin and early history, but the following legend has been passed down orally for generations.

Six hundred years ago, a family from Parappur flees southward with their family deity for safety from Muslims invading their homeland. They arrive to Sasthamcotta, where the Brahmin families married off their women at a young age to protect them from the invaders. A girl from such a family, however, is unable to get married due being born on a Friday under Puratam star (Velli Puratam) as it is believed that the spouses of those born on such a day would have an early death. Therefore, the family offers huge sums of wealth to anyone who would accept her in order to avoid being disowned by their community.

The ‘Karnavar’ (patriarch) of the family which came from Parappur hears of this offer and agrees to marry her however he refuses the wealth offered but instead asks her family to provide food and protection to his family. Upon hearing this, Shasthavu of the Sasthamcotta Temple, transfers the goddess he worshipped to a Shankha and gives to the Karnavar, instructing him to continue his travel until he witnesses a tree split open in half. There he should place the goddess and worship her. He does as instructed and establishes the temple. He also established another temple nearby for his family deity (Parappuramma). Not so long after, he dies and is installed as a ‘Brahmarakshas’ to the right of the goddess. The family comes to be known as Parappur Ammachiveedu, the former part indicating their place of origin and the latter part meaning House of the ‘Ammachi’, where Ammachi refers to the goddess. The subsequent Karnavars are installed as ‘Yogeeswarans’ and for this reason are referred to as ‘Eswaran’, a unique practice of the family.

The members of the temple are prohibited from entering the Sabarimala Temple as Sasthavu or Ayyappan respects the family members for worshipping his Guru (the Devi) and would have to stand up to receive them. But once every year, the Karnavar of the temple visits the Sasthamcotta Dharma Sastha Temple from where the goddess was given to his family, before the temple festival starts but does not enter the temple.

== Story of Jinn ==
There was once a fight between two Nair families over a land area, when one of the family's women became pregnant. This meant that this family would become owners of the land after the child's birth. Hence, the other family sought the help of an Imam from Ambalappuzha region to abort the child. The child's family came to know about this and sought the protection of Ammachiveedu Amma, who made the Imam's rituals futile. In retaliation, he started doing a ceremony to destroy the goddess. Members of the Ammachiveedu Family became aware of this ritual once the goddess's powers got affected.

They consulted people with knowledge about the ritual and started a counter ritual involving a Sree Chakra. As a result, a black dog arrived and scattered the contents of the Imam's pyre over him.He started burning and died falling in his own pyre. He then became a jinn and no temple was able to hold him. Therefore, the Devi asked to place him directly in front of her, so as to keep an eye on him. The Jinn was then placed under an ilanji tree outside the temple. The Sree Chakra used is then placed to the left of the Devi. The goddess here is Adi Parashakti but she can be worshipped in any form. For instance, in the above-mentioned event, she was worshipped as Bagalamukhi while the pictures in her shrine depict the story of Durga Devi.

== Deities ==
Over the years, many deities were installed for the spiritual benefit of the family. They were Ganapathi, Raktha Chamundi, Paramparu, Yakshi, Marutha, Rakshas and Gandharvan. A kavu was later established around Parappuramma where Nagaraja, Nagayakshi and Nagakanyaka were installed. Yogeeswarans were placed as shrines for the departed Karnavars unlike other temples were Yogeeswarans are shrines for yogis. There is a total of six Yogeeswarans, three in the temple and three in the kavu. The ceremonies in the kavu are conducted by Pambummekkattu Mana of Thrissur. Villikulam is a family associated with Ammachiveedu. They help with ceremonies during the festival.

The temple has a small Garbagriha, measuring only 4 feet by 4 feet. The shrine of the Goddess has a silver clad Peedam, upon which two gold covered Shankha are placed.

== Festival ==
The festival of the temple starts only after Makaravilakku. The festival starts off with the Karnavar hoisting the flag and ends by him conducting the sword procession and kuruthi ceremony. The priests of the temple are from Ambalappuzha.

== History ==
The male members of the family have the surname of 'Unnithan' and the females 'Itty'. It is believed that the family inherited the title of Unnithan from an early member, upon whom the Desinganadu King bestowed it for the services he rendered as his 'Padathalavan' (Commander). The family used to operate a Kalari, which maintained soldiers for 'Naduvazhis' (local rulers).

Up until 1951, a fowl was sacrificed during the kuruthi ceremony.

The present day temple's construction was completed in 1968. In the following decade, after a slew of court cases the monopoly the Karnavar had over the temple came to an end. The administration of the temple was then handed over to the Manager (religious aspects) and the Deputy Manager (financial aspects). Adv. G. Mohanan Unnithan (1940-2023) served as the first Deputy Manager from 1978 till 2023.

== See also ==
- List of Hindu temples in Kerala
- Sasthamcotta Sree Dharma Sastha Temple
