= Indiana Hoosiers football under Curt Cignetti =

History of the Indiana Hoosiers football program under head coach Curt Cignetti

Indiana Hoosiers
- Cignetti at the White House celebrating Indiana’s 2025 National Championship
- Athletic director: Scott Dolson (2023-present)
- Head coach: Curt Cignetti; 3rd season, 36–4 (.900)
- Stadium: Memorial Stadium
- Conference: Big Ten Conference
- Colors: Crimson and cream
- Bowl record: 2–0 (1.000)

National championships
- Claimed: 1 (2025)

Conference championships
- 1
- Heisman winners: 1
- Consensus All-Americans: 2

Indiana Hoosiers football under Curt Cignetti began on November 30, 2023, when Cignetti was hired as the 30th Head Coach of the Indiana Hoosiers football team. Cignetti succeeded Tom Allen, who had been dismissed following the 2023 season. Previously the head coach at James Madison, Cignetti inherited a program that had finished 3–9 in its previous season and had three consecutive losing seasons. His tenure has been marked by an extraordinarily rapid rise in the program's national prominence, including consecutive appearances in the College Football Playoff, a Big Ten Conference championship, and a national championship.

On November 30, 2023, Cignetti officially accepted the head coaching position with the Hoosiers. In his first season in 2024, Indiana began the year 10–0, the best start in program history, and rose into the top five of the national rankings. The Hoosiers completed the regular season 11-1 and earned the program's first berth in the College Football Playoff as the No. 10 seed. Indiana's season ended with a first-round loss to Notre Dame, giving the Hoosiers an 11–2 final record and setting a program record for wins in a season. The turnaround resulted in Cignetti receiving multiple national and conference coaching honors and established Indiana as a nationally ranked program entering his second season.

Indiana followed its 2024 breakthrough with an undefeated 2025 season. Led by California transfer quarterback Fernando Mendoza, the Hoosiers completed a 12–0 regular season and defeated Ohio State in the Big Ten Championship Game to win the program's first outright conference championship since 1945. Mendoza became the first Indiana player to win the Heisman Trophy. Indiana entered the College Football Playoff as the No. 1 seed and defeated Alabama in the Rose Bowl and Oregon in the Peach Bowl before defeating Miami in the national championship game. The victory completed a 16–0 season and gave Indiana its first national championship in football.

The success of Cignetti's first two seasons represented one of the most significant periods in the history of the Indiana football program. Indiana compiled a 27–2 record during the 2024 and 2025 seasons after winning nine games combined over the previous three seasons. The program's rise was accompanied by increased investment in football, changes to recruiting and roster construction, and heightened attendance and national attention. Cignetti's contract, which is currently worth $105.6 million over eight years, makes him the highest paid college football head coach in the country.

Cignetti entered the 2026 season as the reigning national championship head coach, with Indiana seeking to sustain the success of the previous two seasons. His tenure at Indiana, having turned the losingest program in college football history into national champions, has been regarded as one of the greatest turnarounds in the history of American sports.

== Prelude ==
Historically, Indiana had experienced limited sustained success in football compared with many of its Big Ten Conference counterparts. Indiana was historically known for its basketball program, in which it has won five national championships under coaches Branch McCracken and Bob Knight. The football program won Big Ten championships in 1945 and 1967, with the latter team earning Indiana's only appearance in the Rose Bowl prior to Cignetti. Following the 1967 season, Indiana did not win another conference championship and made sporadic bowl appearances. The program experienced periods of success under head coach Bill Mallory during the 1980s and early 90s, including six bowl appearances in an eight-season span from 1986 through 1993, but subsequently endured a prolonged period of losing seasons and frequent coaching changes. From 1995 through 2018, Indiana recorded only one winning season and made three bowl appearances.

Tom Allen became Indiana's head coach in December 2016 after Kevin Wilson resigned. Following consecutive 5–7 seasons in 2017 and 2018, Allen led the program to an 8–5 record in 2019, Indiana's first eight-win season since 1993. The Hoosiers followed with a 6–2 record during the pandemic-shortened 2020, including a 6–1 record in Big Ten play. Indiana reached No. 7 in the AP Poll during the season and finished No. 12 following a loss to Ole Miss in the Outback Bowl. The 2020 campaign marked Indiana's first season with six conference victories and its highest finish in the AP Poll since 1967. Allen received multiple national coaching awards for the season, including the AFCA Coach of the Year Award award.

The program was unable to sustain that success over the following three seasons. Indiana entered the 2021 season ranked No. 17 in the preseason AP Poll but finished 2–10 overall and 0–9 in Big Ten play. The Hoosiers improved to 4–8 in 2022 but again failed to qualify for a bowl game, finishing 2–7 in conference play. By the beginning of the 2023 season, Indiana had gone two consecutive seasons without a winning record after reaching bowl games in each of the previous two years.,

Indiana's struggles continued in 2023. The Hoosiers opened the season with a loss to Ohio State and finished 3–9 overall and 1–8 in Big Ten play. Indiana's only conference victory came against Wisconsin on November 4. The Hoosiers lost their final three games of the season, concluding the year with a 35–31 loss to Purdue in the Old Oaken Bucket game on November 25. The defeat gave Indiana its third consecutive losing season. Over the three seasons following the 2020 campaign, Indiana compiled a 9–27 overall record and went 3–24 in Big Ten play.

On November 26, 2023, one day after the loss to Purdue, Indiana announced that Allen would not return as head coach. Allen departed after seven full seasons as head coach with a 33–49 record. Indiana and Allen agreed to a $15.5 million settlement, to be paid in two installments using athletic department donor funds.

== Overview ==
=== Hiring ===
On November 26, 2023, Indiana University fired head coach Tom Allen following the conclusion of the 2023 regular season. Allen had led the program since 2016, but Indiana had gone 9–27 over his final three seasons, including a 3–9 record in 2023. Athletic Director Scott Dolson said that the program had “lost momentum” and announced that a national search for Allen's successor would begin immediately. Indiana agreed to a $15.5 million settlement with Allen, funded through the athletic department's donor funds.

Dobson led the coaching search with support from university president Pamela Whitten, Indiana University Board of Trustees chair Quinn Buckner, and deputy athletic directors Mattie White and Stephen Harper. The search moved quickly because of the approaching transfer portal and recruiting periods. Indiana conducted phone, virtual, and in-person interviews, with Dolson later stating that Cignetti distinguished himself early in the process. The university prioritized candidates with experience developing quarterbacks and navigating the transfer portal as well as NIL. Dolson later stated that hiring an existing head coach was a “non-negotiable”.

Cignetti emerged as Indiana's choice after five seasons as the head coach at James Madison. He had compiled a 52–9 record with the Dukes, winning three consecutive CAA championships before overseeing the program's transition from the FCS to the FBS. James Madison went 19-4 during its first two FBS seasons and finished the 2023 regular season 11–1. Cignetti had previously served as head coach at Indiana University of Pennsylvania and Elon University, along with serving as recruiting coordinator under Alabama head coach Nick Saban, and had a career head-coaching record of 119–35 at the time of his hiring.

On November 30, four days after Allen's dismissal, Indiana announced Cignetti as the 30th head coach in program history. Cignetti left James Madison despite having a contract there that extended through 2030. He was formally introduced at a press conference at Memorial Stadium on December 1. During his introduction, Cignetti said that the opportunity to coach in the Big Ten and attempt to build Indiana into a successful program had attracted him to the position. He also expressed an intention to change the “culture, mindset, and expectation level” surrounding Indiana football.

Cignetti moved quickly to assemble his first Indiana coaching staff and reconstruct the roster. On December 13, Indiana announced a staff consisting of ten assistant coaches and strength conditioning coach Derek Owings. Seven members of the staff had worked with Cignetti at James Madison, including offensive coordinator Mike Shanahan, defensive coordinator Bryant Haines, and quarterbacks coach and co-offensive coordinator Tino Sunseri. Bob Bostad, Indiana's offensive line coach under Allen, was retained.

The coaching change also resulted in significant roster turnover. Twenty-five Indiana players entered the transfer portal during the transition, including ten offensive starters, while Cignetti and his staff added a large transfer class of their own. Among the additions were Ohio quarterback Kurtis Rourke and several former James Madison players. By February 2024, Indiana's roster included 52 players who had previously played at other college programs, including ten former James Madison players. Cignetti later described rebuilding the roster as one of his first priorities after taking the position.

== Seasons ==
=== First season ===
Cignetti entered his first season at Indiana with a substantially reconstructed roster. Indiana made extensive use of the transfer portal, adding several players who had previously played for Cignetti at James Madison. Among the additions was Ohio transfer quarterback Kurtis Rourke, who was named the starting quarterback prior to the season.

In Cignetti's debut, Indiana defeated Florida International 31–7. The Hoosiers followed with victories over Western Illinois and UCLA, the latter giving Cignetti his first Big Ten victory. Wins over Charlotte, Maryland and Northwestern improved Indiana to 6–0 and made the Hoosiers bowl eligible. Following a bye week, Indiana defeated Nebraska 56–7 to improve to 7–0 for the first time since 1967. Rourke suffered a thumb injury during the game and missed the following week's 31–17 victory over Washington. After returning against Michigan State, Rourke helped Indiana overcome an early 10–0 deficit to win 47–10 and improve to 9–0, the best start in program history.

Indiana defeated defending national champion Michigan 20–15 on November 9, giving the program its first 10–win season. The Hoosiers rose to No. 5 in the AP Poll, their highest ranking since 1967, and Cignetti signed an eight-year contract extension through 2032 during the following bye week, worth $8 million annually. Indiana suffered its first loss on November 23 at No. 2 Ohio State, 38–15, before defeating arch-rival Purdue 66–0 in the Old Oaken Bucket to finish the regular season 11–1. The Purdue victory was the largest by either team in the history of the rivalry.

Indiana was selected to the College Football Playoff for the first time and received the No. 10 seed. The Hoosiers traveled to face seventh-seeded Notre Dame in the first round on December 20, where they lost 27–17. Indiana finished Cignetti's first season 11–2 overall and 8–1 in Big Ten play, setting program records for overall and conference victories in a season.

Following the season, Cignetti received Big Ten Coach of the Year honors and several national coach of the year awards, including those presented by the Associated Press, American Football Coaches Association, Walter Camp Football Foundation and Home Depot. Indiana finished No. 10 in the final AP Poll, its highest final ranking since 1967.

=== 2025 National championship ===
Following an 11–2 season and Indiana's first College Football Playoff appearance in 2024, Cignetti entered his second season looking to build upon the program's first 11-win season. The Hoosiers underwent another significant roster transition, including the departure of quarterback Kurtis Rourke and several other starters. California transfer Fernando Mendoza was brought in to replace Rourke at quarterback, while Cignetti again used the transfer portal to add experienced players at several positions. Indiana also returned several key contributors from the 2024 team, including wide receivers Omar Cooper Jr. and defensive back D'Angelo Ponds. After finishing the previous season ranked No. 10, Indiana opened 2025 ranked No. 20 in the AP Poll, marking the program's first preseason ranking since 2021.

Indiana won its first three non-conference games before facing No. 9 Illinois on September 20. The No. 19 Hoosiers won 63–10, with the 53-point margin becoming the largest by a team ranked outside the AP top 10 over a top-10 opponent. Indiana subsequently defeated Iowa before winning 30–20 at No. 3 Oregon on October 11, the first time the Hoosiers had ever defeated a top 5 team on the road. Following the victory, Cignetti signed an 8-year, $93 million contract extension worth $11.6 million annually, making him the third highest paid college football coach in the country at the time.

Indiana remained undefeated through the remainder of the regular season, including a 27–24 victory at Penn State in which Mendoza led the game-winning touchdown drive in the final minutes. Victories over Wisconsin and Purdue completed the first 12–0 regular season in program history and sent Indiana to its first Big Ten Football Championship Game.

In the Big Ten Championship Game, No. 2 Indiana defeated No. 1 and defending national champion Ohio State 13–10. The victory gave Indiana its first outright Big Ten championship since 1945 and improved the Hoosiers to 13–0. Mendoza subsequently won the Heisman Trophy, becoming the first Indiana player to receive the award.

Indiana received the No. 1 seed in the College Football Playoff and a first-round bye. The Hoosiers defeated Alabama 38–3 in the Rose Bowl and Oregon 56–22 in the Peach Bowl semifinal before defeating Miami 27–21 in the national championship game. The victory over Miami gave Indiana its first national championship in football and completed a 16–0 season. The Hoosiers finished No. 1 in the final AP Poll for the first time in program history, while Cignetti improved to 27–2 through his first two seasons at Indiana. Indiana also became the first major college football team in the modern era to finish a season 16–0.

== Head coaching record ==
Year	Team	Overall	Conference	Standing	Bowl/playoffs	Coaches^{#}	AP^{°}
2024	Indiana	11-2	8-1	T-2nd	L CFP First Round^{†}	10	10
2025	Indiana	16-0	9-0	1st	W Rose^{†}, W Peach^{†}, W CFP NCG^{†}	1	1
2026	Indiana	9-2	6-2				
Total:							
National championship Conference title Conference division title or championship game berth
^{†}Indicates Bowl Coalition, Bowl Alliance, BCS, or CFP / New Years' Six bowl.; ^{#}Rankings from final Coaches Poll.
