= Nelan =

Nelan is a surname. Notable people with the surname include:

- Charles Nelan (1859–1904), American artist and political cartoonist
- James Nelan, guitarist for Canadian rock band The Reason

== See also ==
- Neelan
- Nela (name)
- Nolan (surname)
