= Chemmuthal =

- Village
- Location within Tamil Nadu
- Coordinates: 8.17°N 77.43°E
- Country: India
- State: Tamil Nadu
- District: Kanyakumari

Government
  - Type: Special Grade Municipality
  - Body: Killiyoor Municipality

Area
  - Total: 49.371 km^{2} (19.062 sq mi)
- Elevation: 40 m (130 ft)

Population (2011)
  - Total: 224,849
  - Density: 9,813/km^{2} (25,420/sq mi)

Languages
  - Official: Tamil
- Time zone: UTC+5:30 (IST)
- PIN: 629 xxx
- Telephone code: 91-4651
- Vehicle registration: TN-74 & TN-75
- Literacy: 95.35%
- Website: Official Site

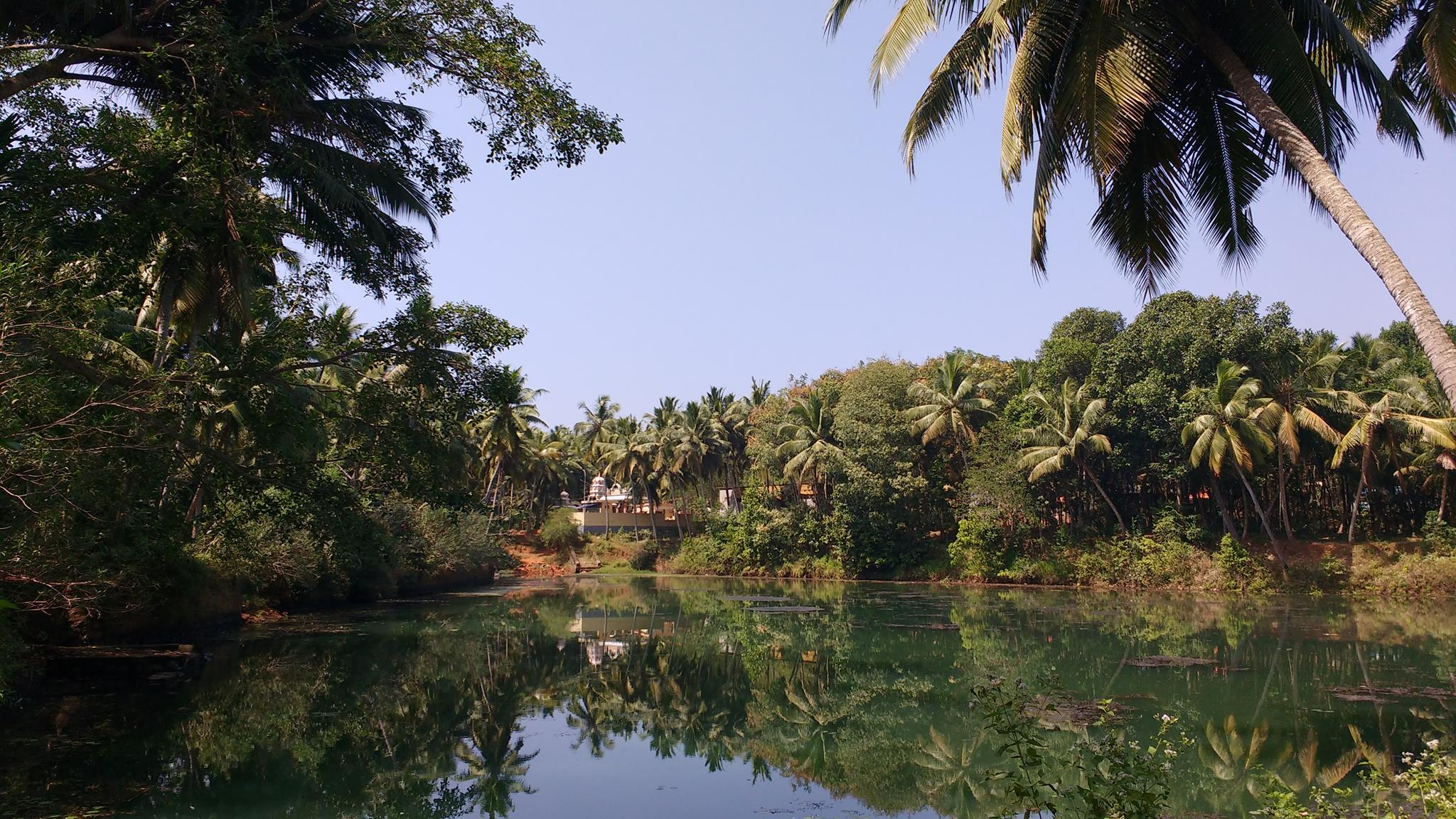

Chemmuthal is a historic landmark in the Kanyakumari district in the Indian state of Tamil Nadu, India. It is located in Vilavancode taluk, in the Killiyoor Panchayat.

== Religion ==
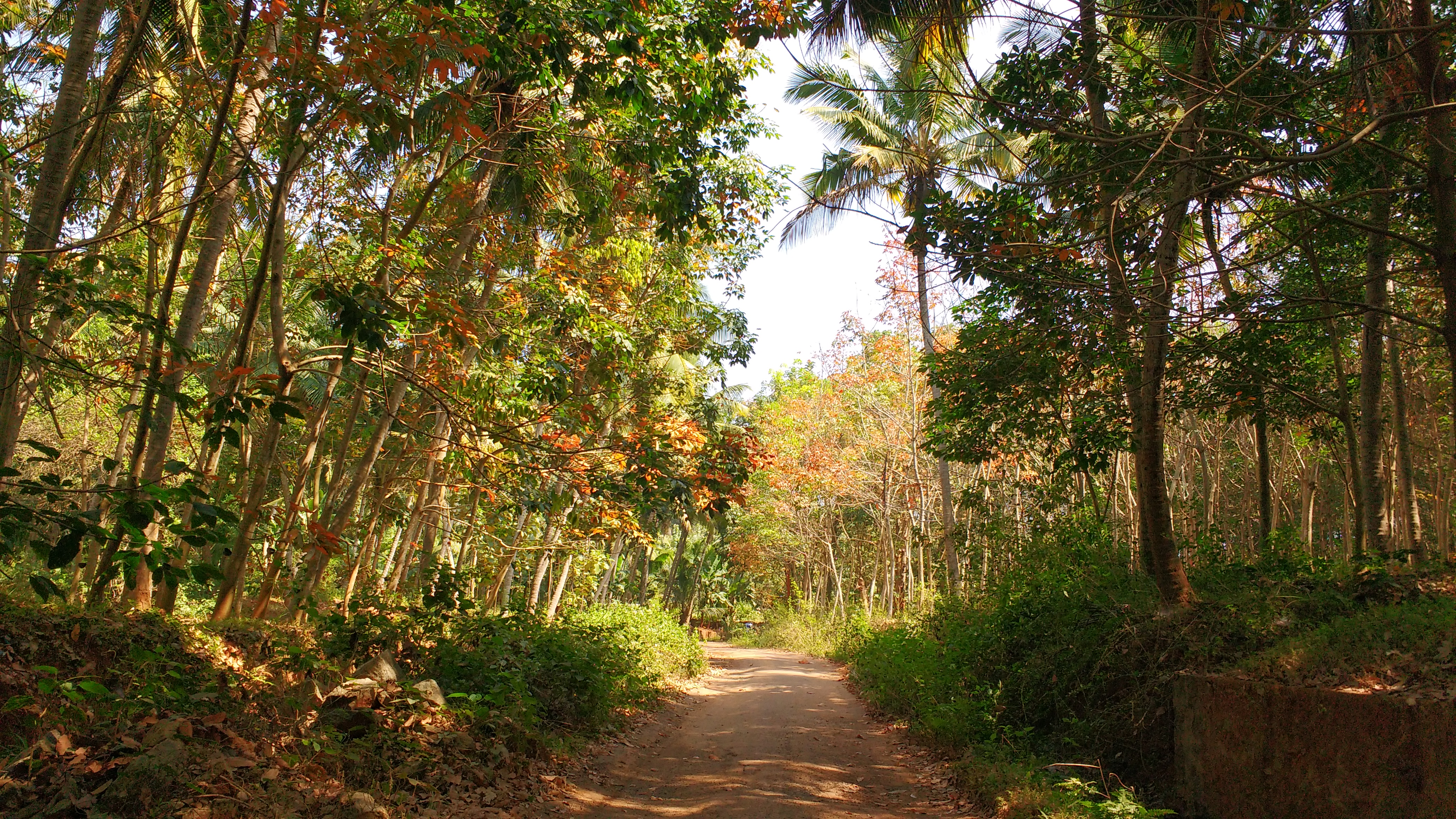

The largest Hindu temple in Chemmuthal is called Sree Dharma Sastha Temple (ஸ்ரீ தர்ம சாஸ்தா).

Seven other Hindu temples and three Christian churches are near Chemmuthal.

== Festivals ==
A major festival in this temple is Karthikai (கார்திகை). During the festival Hindu families light small lamps in front of their homes to welcome the god/goddess. During the month of Karthikai, dishes such as Kozhukatta and Pongal are served as prasadam, a religious offering. The celebrations include the lighting of homemade firecrackers, known as Chutru. In the evening, singers perform bhajans at the temple.

Panguni uttara Mahotsav festival starts during the Tamil month of Panguni.

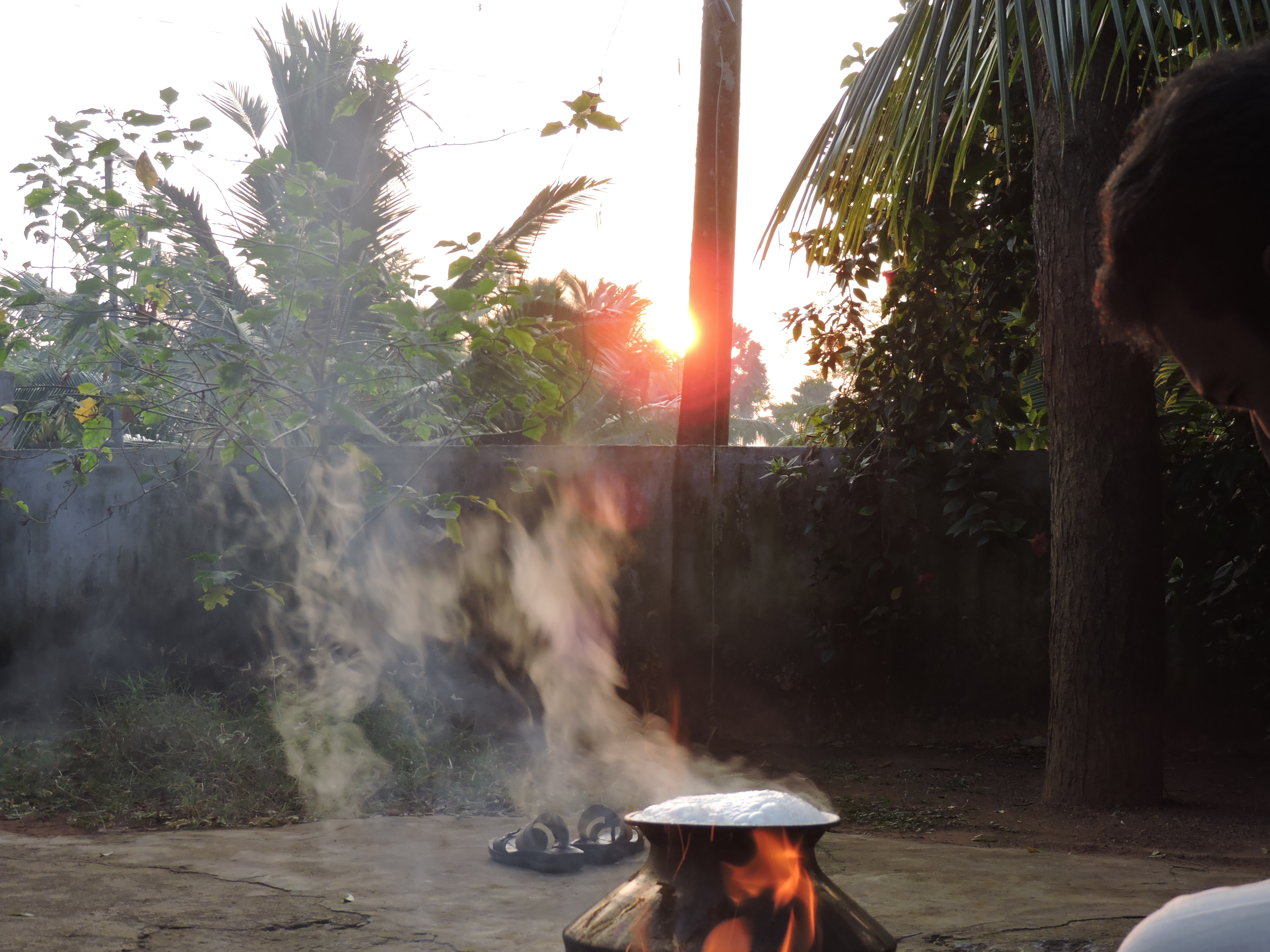
Chemmuthal Pongal

Pongal festival is conducted in the Tamil month of Thai, lasting for two days. This festival is organized by the Vivekananda Youth Club.
