= Neale =

Neale may refer to:

- Neale (surname)
- Neale, County Mayo
- Neale (electric car)

== See also ==
- Neil, containing Neale as a given name
