= Neele =

Neele is a surname and occasional given name. Notable people with this name include:

- Edda Neele (1910–2005), German psychiatrist
- George Potter Neele (1825–1921), English railway executive
- Henry Neele (1798–1828), English poet and literary scholar
- Perrot de Neele (fl. mid-late 13th century), Artesian trouvère
- Richard Neele (died 1486), British judge
- Neele Eckhardt (born 1992), German athlete
- Neele Schuten (born 1999), German bobsledder

== See also ==
- Neale (surname)
- Neel (disambiguation)
