= Nippur =

Archaeological site in Iraq

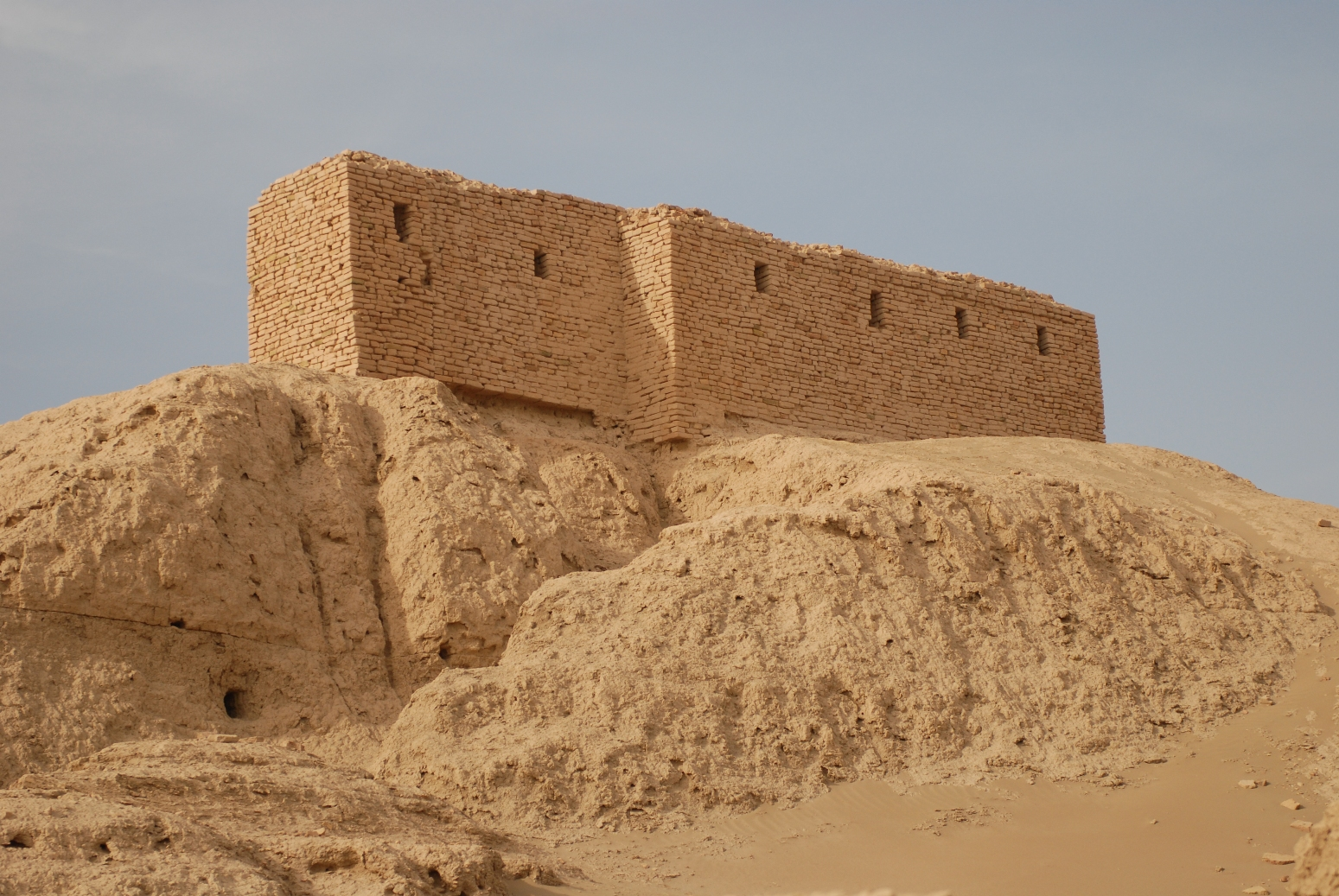
- Ruins of a temple platform in Nippur—the brick structure on top was constructed by American archaeologists around 1900.

- Location within Iraq
- 32°07′35.2″N 45°14′0.17″E
- Type: archaeological site, ancient city
- Location: Nuffar, Afak District, Al-Qādisiyyah Governorate, Iraq
- Region: Mesopotamia

Site notes
- Height: 20 metre
- Area: 150 hectare
- Excavation dates: 1851, 1889–1900, 1948–1990, 2018–present
- Archaeologists: Austen Henry Layard, John Punnett Peters, John Henry Haynes, Hermann Volrath Hilprecht, Richard C. Haines, Thorkild Jacobsen, McGuire Gibson

Nippur (Sumerian: Nibru, often logographically recorded as 𒂗𒆤𒆠, EN.LÍL^{KI}, "Enlil City;" Akkadian: Nibbur) was an ancient Sumerian city. It was the special seat of the worship of the Sumerian god Enlil, the "Lord Wind", ruler of the cosmos, subject to An alone. Nippur was located in modern Nuffar 8 kilometers north of modern Afak, Al-Qādisiyyah Governorate, Iraq. It is roughly 200 km south of modern Baghdad and about 100 km southeast of the ancient city of Babylon. Occupation at the site extended back to the Ubaid period (Ubaid 2 – Hajji Muhammed), the Uruk period, and the Jemdet Nasr period. The origin of the ancient name is unknown but different proposals have been made.

== History ==
=== Early Bronze Age ===
==== Early Dynastic period ====
Nippur never enjoyed political hegemony in its own right, but its control was crucial, as it was considered capable of conferring the overall "kingship" on monarchs from other city-states. It was distinctively a sacred city, important from the possession of the famous Ekur temple of Enlil. Ninurta, son of Enlil, also had his main cult center, the E-shumesha temple, in the city-state.

According to the Tummal Chronicle, Enmebaragesi, an early ruler of Kish, was the first to build up this temple. His influence over Nippur has also been detected archaeologically. The Chronicle lists successive early Sumerian rulers who kept up intermittent ceremonies at the temple: Aga of Kish, son of Enmebaragesi; Mesannepada of Ur; his son Meskiang-nunna; Gilgamesh of Uruk; his son Ur-Nungal; Nanni of Ur and his son Meskiang-nanna. It also indicates that the practice was revived in the Ur III period by Ur-Nammu of Ur, and continued until Ibbi-Sin appointed Enmegalana high priest in Uruk (c. 1950 BC).

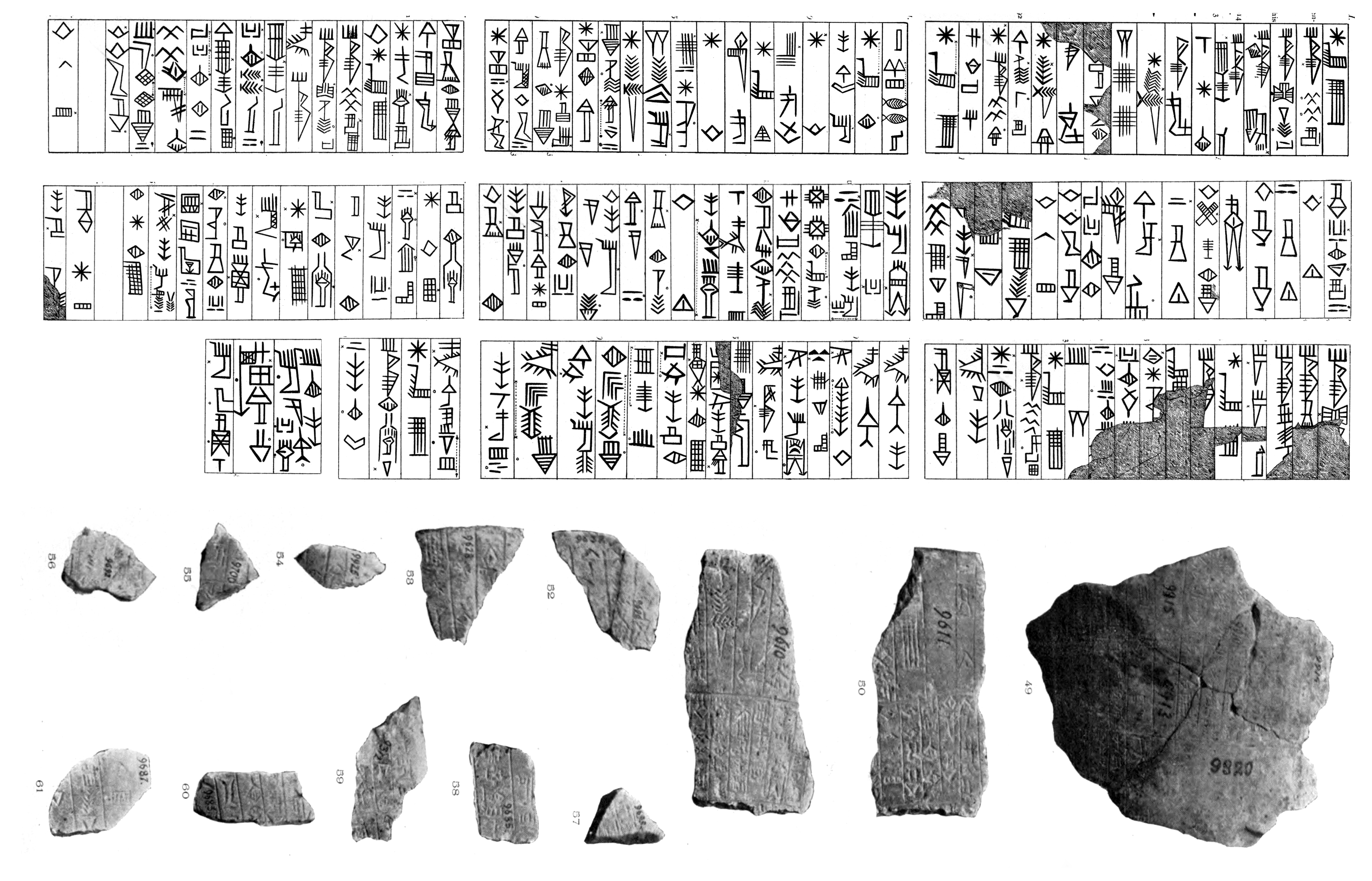
The vase of Lugalzagesi, found in Nippur.

Inscriptions of Lugal-Zage-Si and Lugal-kigub-nidudu, kings of Uruk and Ur respectively, and of other early rulers, on door-sockets and stone vases, show the veneration in which the ancient shrine was then held, and the importance attached to its possession, as giving a certain stamp of legitimacy. On their votive offerings, some of these rulers designate themselves as ensis, or governors.

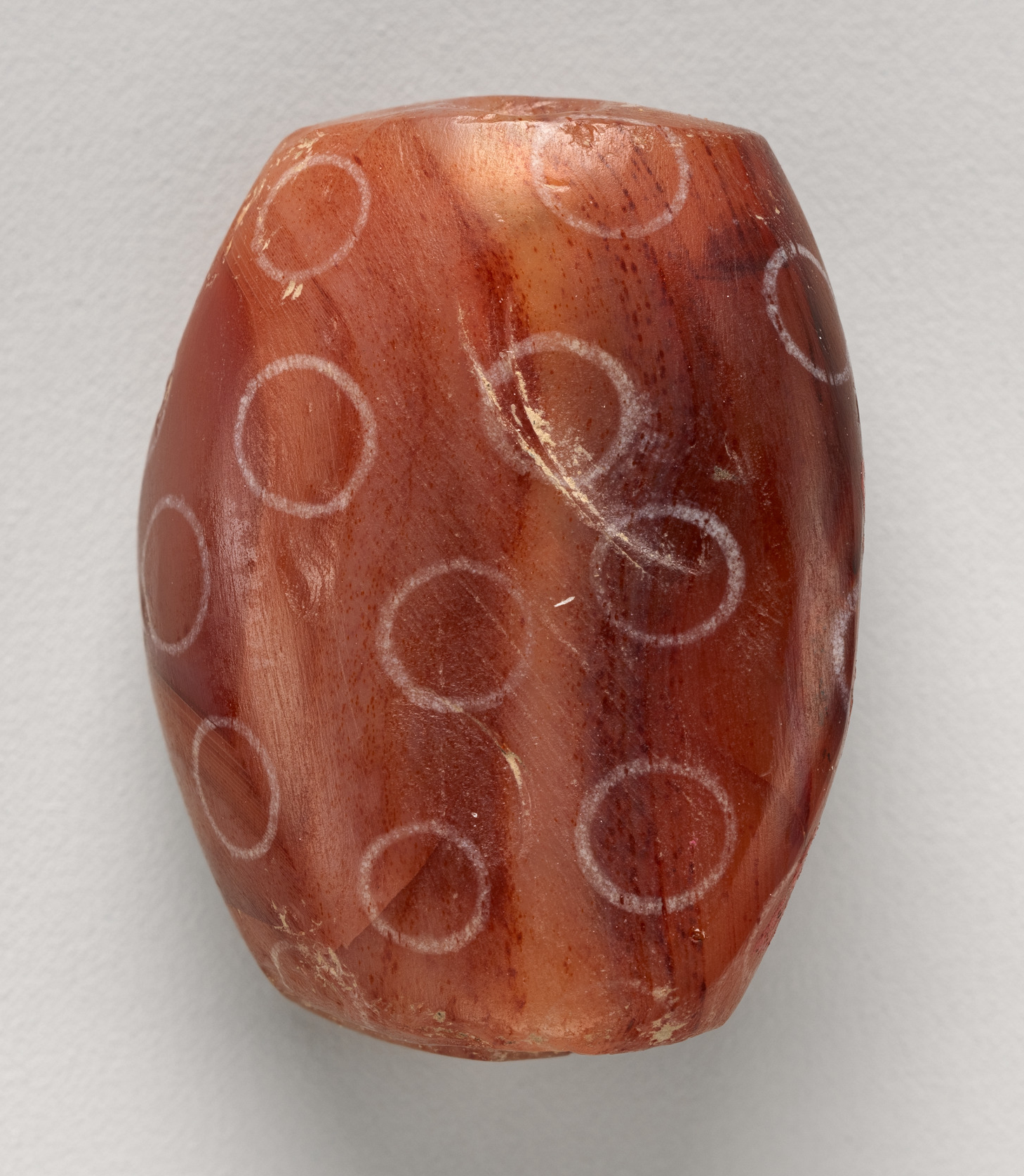
Indus Civilisation carnelian bead with white design, ca. 2900–2350 BC. Found in Nippur. An example of early Indus-Mesopotamia relations.

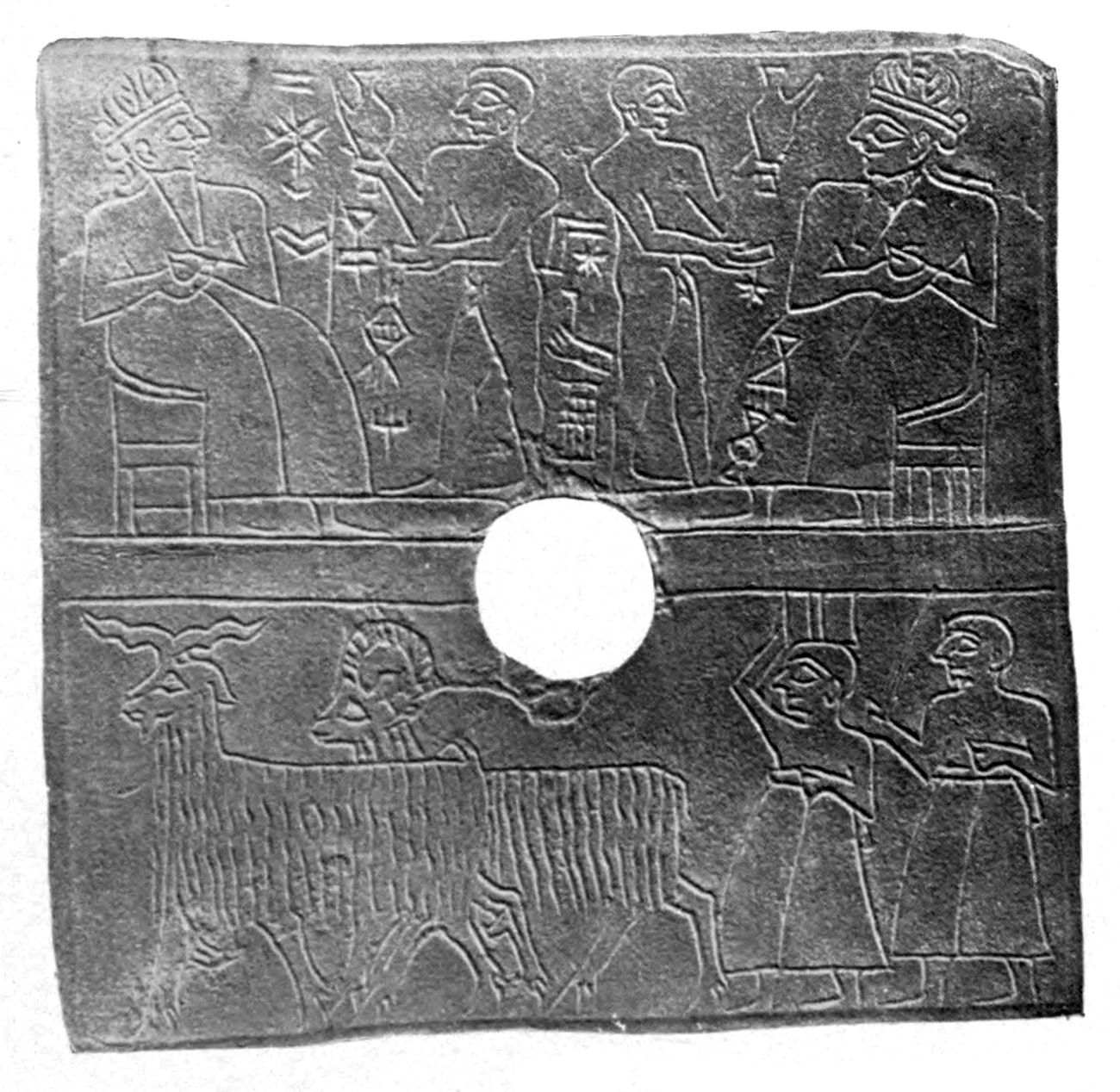
Incised devotional plaque, Nippur.

==== Akkadian period (c. 2350-2150 BC) ====
Late in the 3rd millennium BC, Nippur was conquered and occupied by the rulers of Akkad, or Agade, and numerous votive objects of Sargon, Rimush, and Naram-Sin testify to the veneration in which they also held this sanctuary. Naram-Sin rebuilt both the Ekur temple and the 17.5 meter wide city walls. One of the few instances of Nippur being recorded as having its own ruler comes from a tablet depicting a revolt of several Mesopotamian cities against Naram-Sin, including Nippur under Amar-enlila. The tablet goes on to relate that Naram-Sin defeated these rebel cities in nine battles, and brought them back under his control. The Weidner tablet (ABC 19) suggests that the Akkadian Empire fell as divine retribution, because of Sargon's initiating the transfer of "holy city" status from Nippur to Babylon.

This Akkadian occupation was succeeded by occupation during the third dynasty of Ur, and the constructions of Ur-Nammu, the great builder of temples, are superimposed immediately upon those of Naram-Sin. Ur-Nammu gave the temple its final characteristic form. Partly razing the constructions of his predecessors, he erected a terrace of bricks, some 12 m high, covering a space of about 32,000 m^{2}. Near the northwestern edge, towards the western corner, he built a ziggurat of three stages of dry brick, faced with kiln-fired bricks laid in bitumen. On the summit stood, as at Ur and Eridu, a small chamber, the special shrine or abode of the god. Access to the stages of the ziggurat, from the court beneath, was by an inclined plane on the south-east side. To the north-east of the ziggurat stood, apparently, the House of Bel, and in the courts below the ziggurat stood various other buildings, shrines, treasure chambers, and the like. The whole structure was oriented with the corners toward the cardinal points of the compass.

==== Ur III period (c. 2112-2004 BC) ====
Ur-Nammu also rebuilt the walls of the city on the line of Naram-Sin's walls. The restoration of the general features of the temple of this, and the immediately succeeding periods, has been greatly facilitated by the discovery of a sketch map on a fragment of a clay tablet. This sketch map represents a quarter of the city to the east of the Shatt-en-Nil canal. This quarter was enclosed within its own walls, a city within a city, forming an irregular square, with sides roughly 820 m long, separated from the other quarters, and from the country to the north and east, by canals on all sides, with broad quays along the walls. A smaller canal divided this quarter of the city itself into two parts. In the south-eastern part, in the middle of its southeast side, stood the temple, while in the northwest part, along the Shatt-en-Nil, two great storehouses are indicated. The temple proper, according to this plan, consisted of an outer and inner court, each covering approximately 8 acres (32,000 m^{2}), surrounded by double walls, with a ziggurat on the north-western edge of the latter.

Ur III ruler Shu-Sin, after destroying Šimānum, as noted in a year name, settled the prisoners of that war near Nippur he founded called Šimānum (sometimes called E-Šu-Suen). This practice for disposition of prisoners continued into the first millennium.

=== Middle Bronze Age ===
==== Isin/Larsa period (c. 2020-1820 BC) ====
The temple continued to be built upon or rebuilt by kings of various succeeding dynasties, as shown by bricks and votive objects bearing the inscriptions of the kings of various dynasties of Ur and Isin. It seems to have suffered severely in some manner at or about the time the Elamites invaded, as shown by broken fragments of statuary, votive vases, and the like, from that period. Rim-Sin I, the king of Larsa, styles himself "shepherd of the land of Nippur".

==== Old Babylonian period (1820-1587 BC) ====
Babylonia in the time of Hammurabi.

With the establishment of the Babylonian empire, under Hammurabi (r. 1792-1750 BC), early in the 2nd millennium BC, the religious, as well as the political center of influence, was transferred to Babylon, Marduk became lord of the pantheon, many of Enlil's attributes were transferred to him, and Ekur, Enlil's temple, was to some extent neglected.

The city was taken by Ilī-ma-ilu, the first ruler of the First Sealand dynasty in about the 29th year of the reign of Samsu-iluna, ruler of Babylon. It was retaken by Abī-ešuḫ by his 5th year, after he damned the Tigris river. During the reign of Ammi-Ditana Nippur was again attacked by Sealand forces and the Ekur temple of Enil sacked and looted. A text from the Babylonian fortress at Dūr-Abī-ešuḫ includes "... five hundred enemy soldiers went to Nippur together with mules and labourers(?). They entered the Ekur, vandalised the doors and walls of the cultrooms of [Enlil and Ninlil(?) and] set light to the doors. They unfastened the (doors’) copper (sheathing), loaded it on the mules and then went away. ... three hundred enemy soldiers entered the Ekur together with mules, and ... Enemy [soldiers] have desecrated [the cultrooms(?)] of the Ekurigigal and the Ekur. Every day enemy soldiers are regularly at Nippur.".

=== Late Bronze Age ===
The Late Bronze Age was from around 1600/1550 to 1200/1150 BC. In 1587 BC, the Fall of the Old Babylonian Kingdom came after Mursili I of Hatti raided Babylon in an event known as the "Sack of Babylon".

==== Kassite period ====
Under the succeeding Kassite dynasty, shortly after the middle of the 2nd millennium, Ekur was restored once more to its former splendor, several monarchs of that dynasty built upon and adorned it, and thousands of inscriptions, dating from the time of those rulers, have been discovered in its archives. A new temple within Ekur, the Ekurigibarra, was built by Kurigalzu I (c. 1375 BC).

=== Iron Age onwards ===
After the middle of the 12th century BC follows another long period of comparative neglect due to the river Euphrates changing its course, but with the waters return and the conquest of Babylonia by the Assyrian king Sargon II, at the close of the 8th century BC, we meet again with building inscriptions, and under Ashurbanipal, about the middle of the 7th century BC, we find Ekur restored with a splendour greater than ever before, the ziggurat of that period being 58 by 39 m. After the fall of the Neo-Assyrian Empire Ekur appears to have gradually fallen into decay, until finally, in the Seleucid period, the ancient temple was turned into a fortress (Ancient Greek: Νιππούρ, Nippoúr). Huge walls were erected at the edges of the ancient terrace, the courts of the temple were filled with houses and streets, and the ziggurat itself was curiously built over in a cruciform shape, and converted into an acropolis for the fortress. This fortress was occupied and further built upon until the close of the Parthian period, about 250 AD; but under the succeeding rule of the Sassanids it in its turn fell into decay.

=== Islamic abandonment ===
Nippur remained inhabited in Islamic times, and is mentioned by early Muslim geographers under the name of Niffar. It lay on the Nahr an-Nars canal, believed to have been built by Narses. By the late 800s, though, geographers no longer mentioned it, which indicates that the city had gone into decline by that time. This was part of a broader decline in settlements throughout Iraq, especially in the south, as decaying infrastructure and political violence resulted in large areas being completely abandoned. However, Nippur (Nifr) remained the seat of a Christian bishop of the Patriarchal Province of the Church of the East until the late 900s, when the bishopric was transferred to the city of Nil to the northwest. Nippur itself may have remained occupied even later, since ceramics found among the ruins display underglaze sgraffiato drawings, which were not used much prior to the end of the 10th century. By the time of Yaqut al-Hamawi in the early 1200s, Nippur had been definitively abandoned, although Yaqut still recognized its ruins as the site of a famous place.

On the upper surface of these mounds was found a considerable Jewish town, dating from about the beginning of the Arabic period onward to the 10th century AD, in the houses of which were large numbers of Aramaic incantation bowls. Jewish names, appearing in the Persian documents discovered at Nippur, show, however, that Jewish settlement at that city dates in fact from a much earlier period.

== Archaeology ==
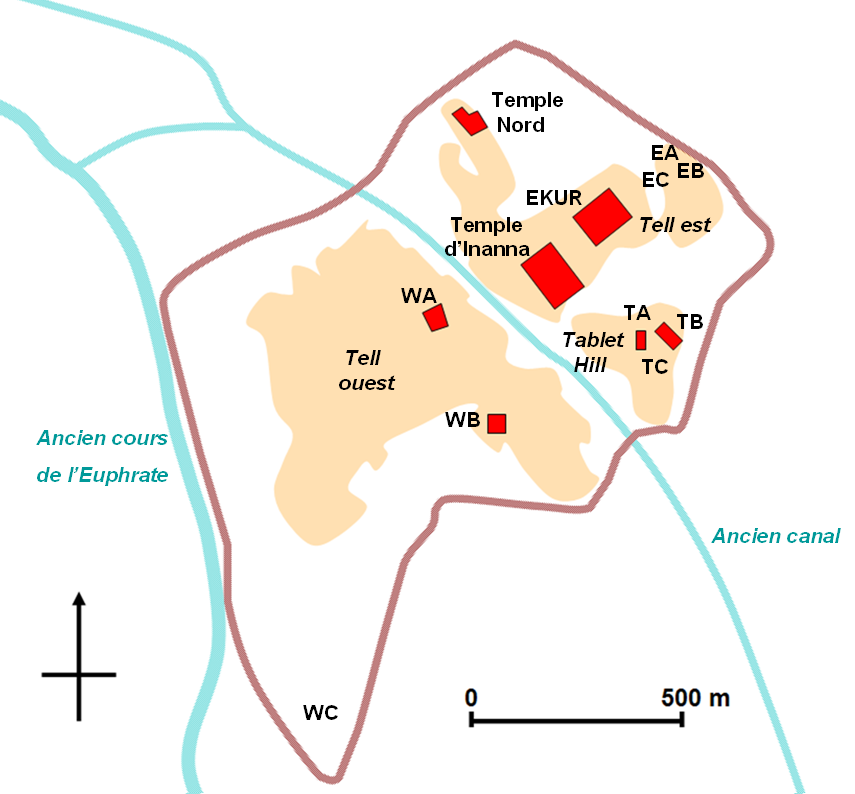
Map of the site in French

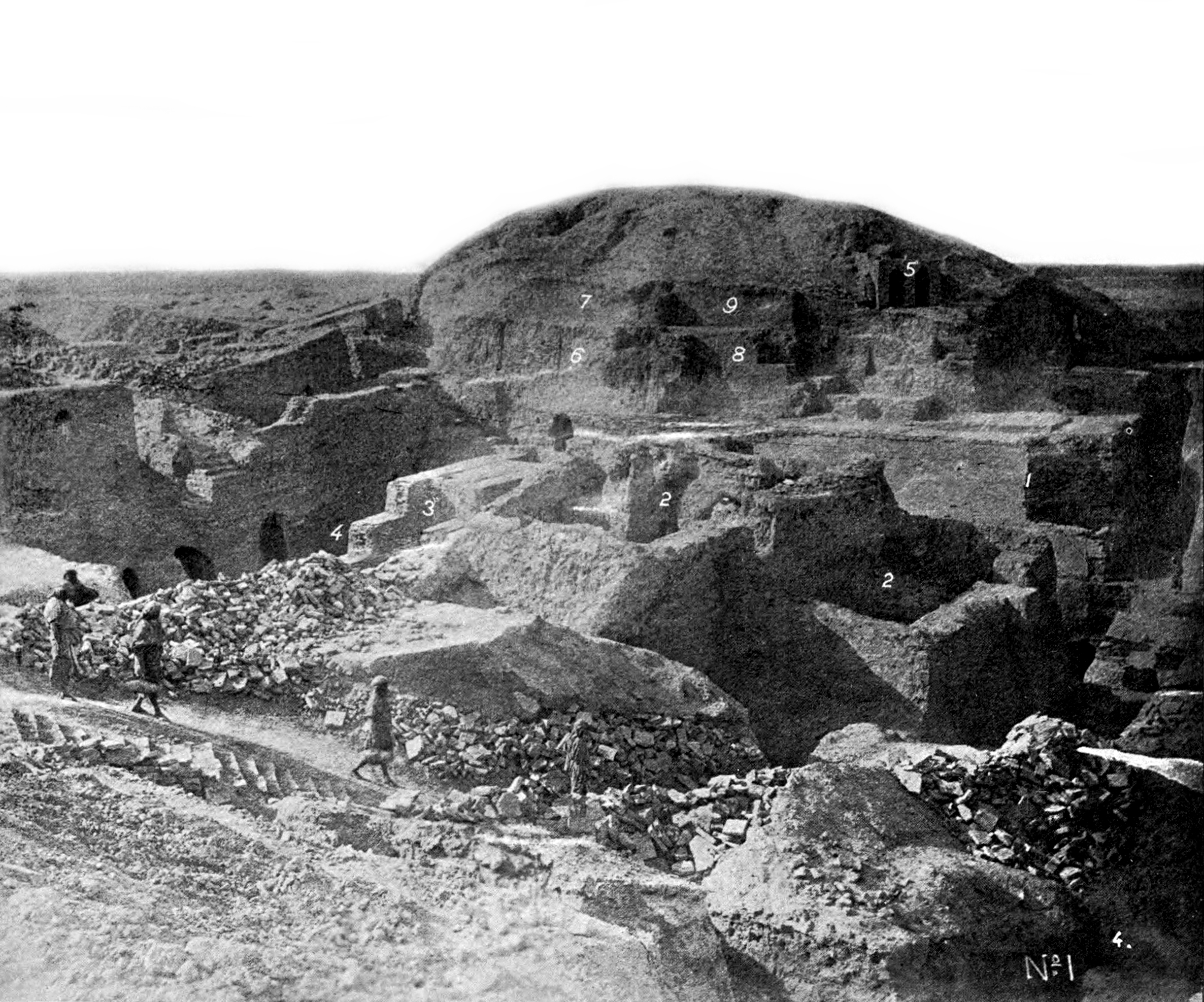
Nippur, Temple of Bel excavation, 1896

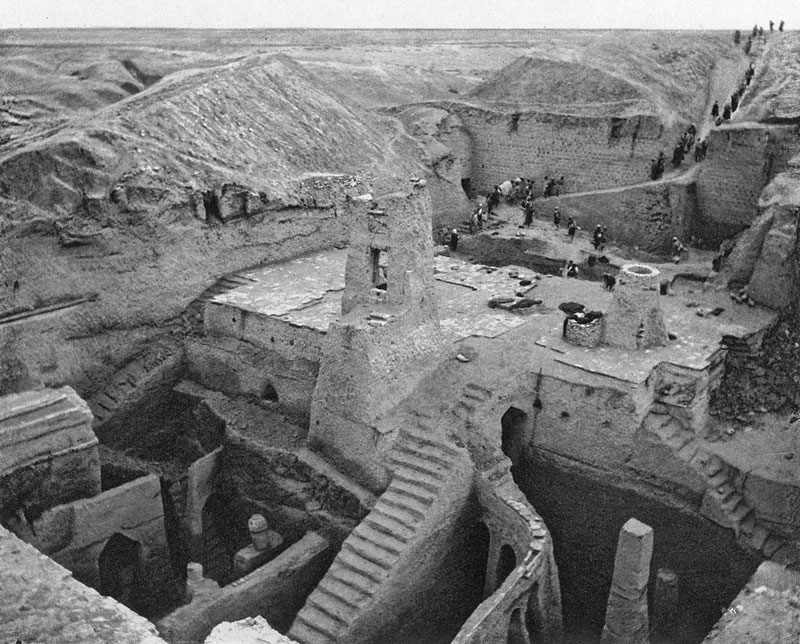
Nippur excavations, 1893

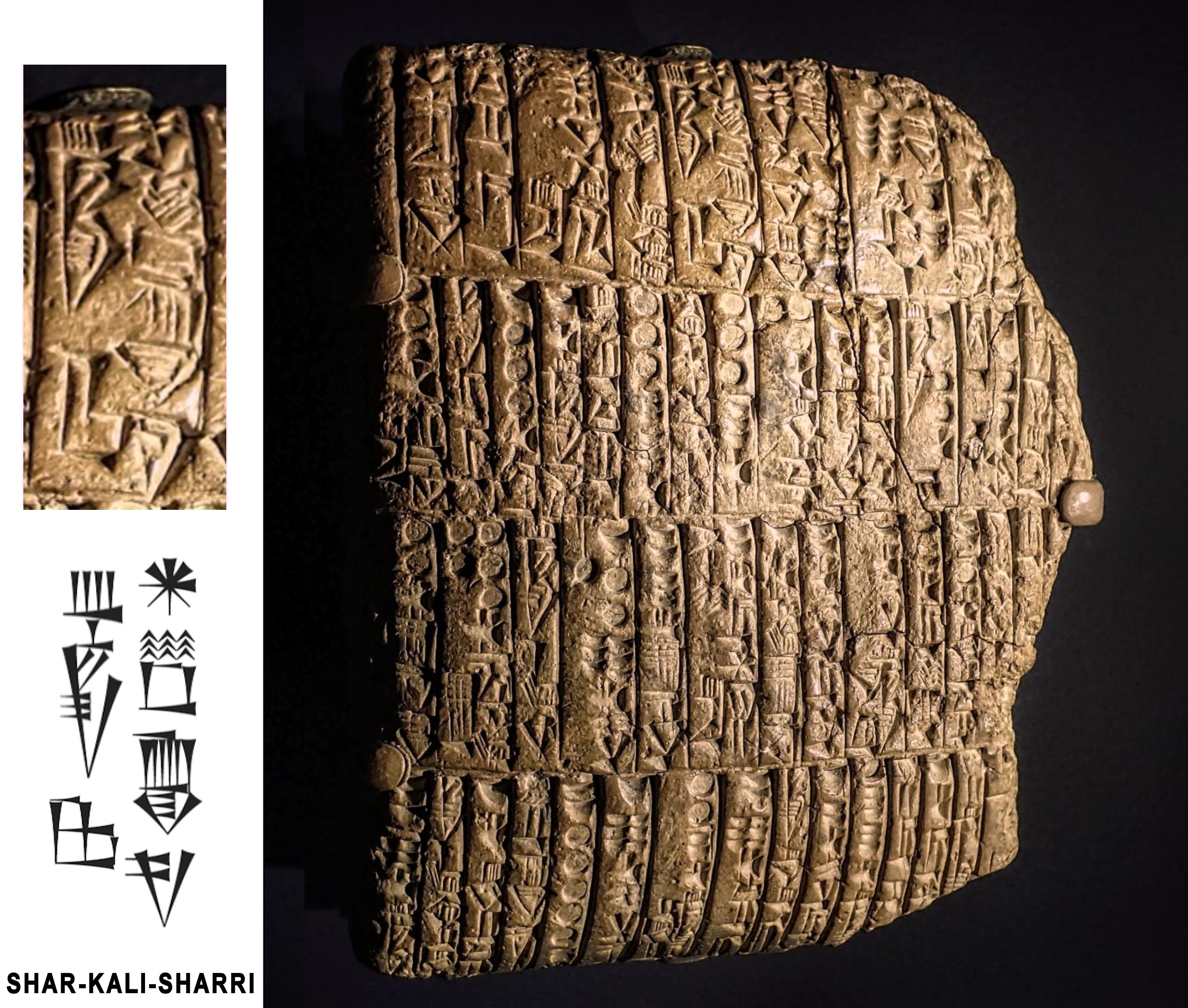
Cuneiform tablet from Nippur, in the name of Shar-Kali-Sharri, 2300–2100 BC

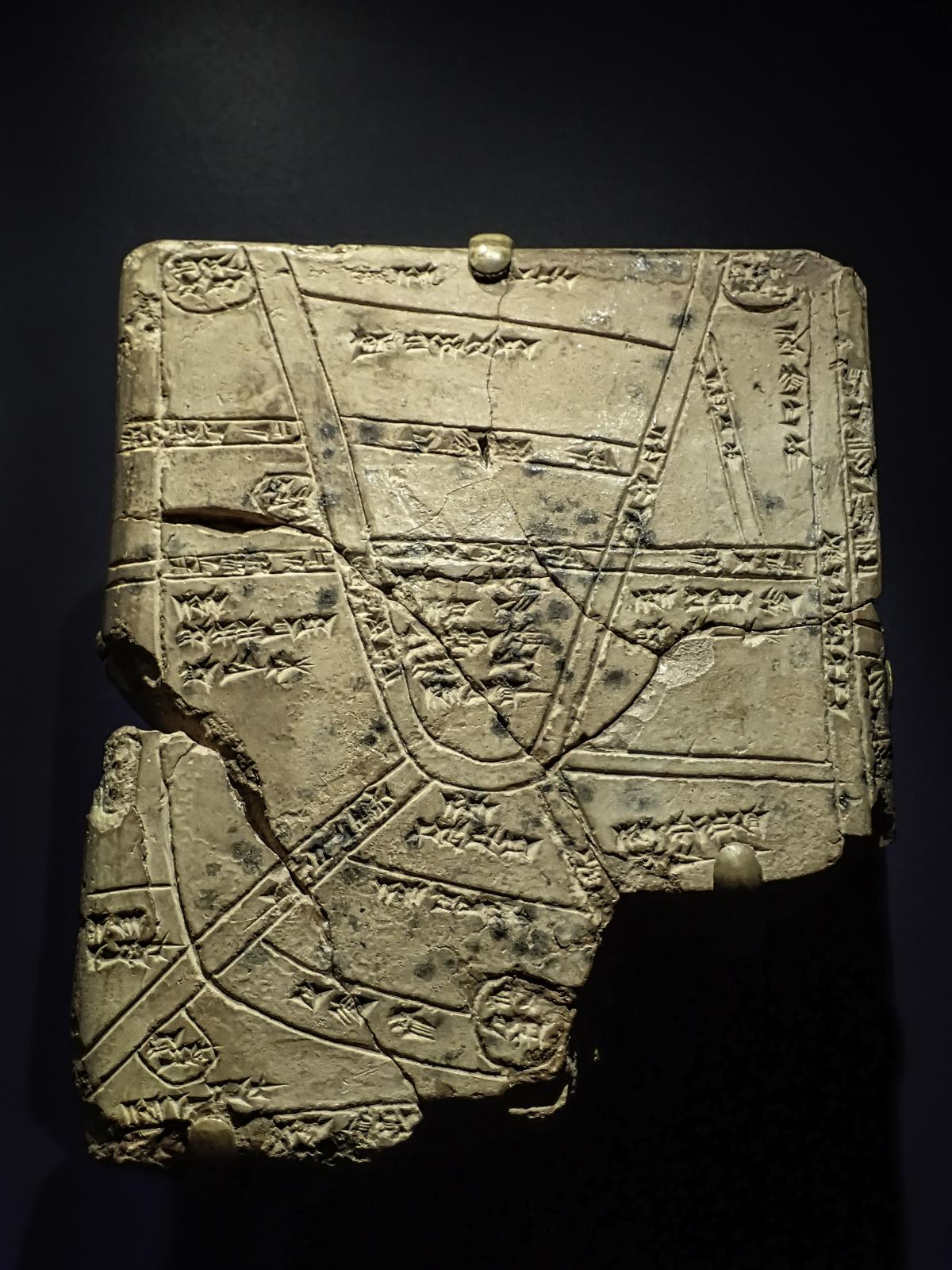
Babylonian cuneiform tablet with a map from Nippur, Kassite period, 1550–1450 BC

Nippur was situated on both sides of the ancient bed of the Shatt-en-Nil canal, one of the earliest courses of the Euphrates, between the present bed of that river and the Tigris, almost 160 km southeast of Baghdad. The canal bed divides the site into an East Mound and West Mound. It is represented by the great complex of ruin mounds known to the Arabs as Nuffar, written by the earlier explorers Niffer, divided into two main parts by the dry bed of the old Shatt-en-Nil (Arakhat). The highest point of these ruins, a conical hill rising about 30 m above the level of the surrounding plain, northeast of the canal bed, is called by the Arabs Bint el-Amiror "prince's daughter". The site reached a maximum extent of 130 hectares, this occurring in the Ur III period and again in the Kassite period.

Nippur was first excavated, briefly, by Sir Austen Henry Layard in 1851. Full-scale digging was begun by an expedition from the University of Pennsylvania. The work involved four seasons of excavation between 1889 and 1900 and was led by John Punnett Peters, John Henry Haynes, and Hermann Volrath Hilprecht. Thousands of tablets were found at a smaller mound dubbed "tablet hill", about 7.5 meters in average height and 52 square meters in area, southeast of the temple mound. A true arch, one of the world's earliest examples, was also found. In the Parthian layer a box containing fragments of votive axes made of glass from the Kassite period were found. Several late Kassite rulers are represented including Kurigalzu II.

Nippur was excavated for 19 seasons between 1948 and 1990 by a team from the Oriental Institute of Chicago, joined at times by the University of Pennsylvania Museum of Archaeology and Anthropology and the American Schools of Oriental Research. Part of the effort involved removing large archaeological dumps from the University of Pennsylvania excavations. In the process Early Dynastic bowls, cuneiform tablets, and brick stamps were found. At the temples of Inanna and at Ekur foundation deposits were found with statues of Shulgi and Ur-Nammu. A temple of Inanna, begun in the Early Dynastic period was completely excavated. Subsequent superimposed new iterations of the temple extended all the way up to Parthian times. Finds included a tablet dated to the 4th year of the Kassite king Shagarakti-Shuriash, one dated to the 44th year of Ur III king Shulgi, and an Indus Valley stamp seal. In 1977 they briefly excavated at the nearby site of Umm al-Hafriyat which was in the process of being heavily looted. Sargonic period tablets found there suggest the ancient name of that site was as Maškan-Ili-Akkade (maš-gán^{ki}-ni-dingir-a-ga-dè^{ki}). The excavation is now in the process of being published. Cuneiform tablets from this excavation are still in the process of being published.

Preliminary efforts to restart work at Nippur began in 2018 under McGuire Gibson. Excavation work at Nippur began in April 2019 under Abbas Alizadeh. Initial focus at Nippur was on a major Parthian period building and a small Late Sassanian house. Work also occurred at the Ekur temple. Permission has also been granted to dig at Dlehim and Drehem. Excavation began in November 2022 for the 21st season which lasted two months. Work began at nearby Drehem but ceased after authorities decided that a police station must first be established there to prevent looting. Work then returned to the Parthian building.

The current excavations are focused on the southern neighborhoods of Nippur. These were first occupied in the Ur III period when the city expanded from 80 to 135 hectares in area, all within a new city wall. It was then abandoned and not occupied again until the Kassite period, abandoned again, and re-used in the early first-millennium BC. New excavation here began in 2024 but were cut short after 1 week due to the security situation. Full excavation resumed in 2025 by a team from the Iraqi State Board of Antiquities and Heritage, University of Chicago, University of Pennsylvania, Autonomous University of Madrid, and University of Winnipeg. Two sets of trenches were opened. One set (WC-4/6) examined the 3 meter wide Kassite period city wall which lies on the deliberately flattened Ur III wall. Outside that wall and before an ancient 50 meter wide watercourse were a number of substantial buildings associated with bread ovens. Other structures outside the wall appeared to be shipping related. The other set or trenches (WC-5/7) was in the southern corner of the city, inside the wall. A large, at least 200 square meter, early first-millennium BC house was found. There were several intramural graves including two with "bathtub-shaped" coffins. The southern city corner also contained some Parthian period graves. A large unexcavated area was surveyed with magnetic gradiometry though the results were not yet available.

=== Ziggurat ===
Extensive excavation details have been recorded for the Ziggurat of Ur-Gur. Overall, the ziggurat site is 25 meters in height, has a rectangular base of 39 meters by 58 meters, consisting three stages of dry brick, and faced with kiln-fired bricks laid in bitumen. The northern corner of the ziggurat points to 12 degrees east of the magnetic north. Construction structure and materials are homogeneous, of small unbaked bricks, laid in different ways: first layer of bricks is on the edge sides with the flat sides out, second layer on the edge sides with the ends out, third layer on the flat sides with the edges out.

The ziggurat contains a water conduit system. From the upper surface of the ziggurat, there is a conduit for water drainage in the middle of three façades. Built by baked bricks 1 metre in breadth and 3 meters in depth, around the conduit base is a plaster of bitumen, sloping outward with gutters to carry off water.

Pavements extend from the ziggurat in a cruciform shape with square-like large bricks, in which pieces of pottery are used to fasten the clay together. They extend 2.4 meters below the ziggurat foundation and 12 meters away, connected to the lowest stage of the ziggurat, which protects the ziggurat foundation from rain.

=== Temple of Enlil ===
The Temple of Enlil situated northeast of the ziggurat was excavated. Topography of the Temple of Enlil was yielded. By stratigraphic excavation, the chronological sequence of the temple could be constructed. The temple dated to Ur III period was constructed by Urnammu, restored and rebuilt by kings ruled Nippur for centuries.

As the Temple of Enlil was rebuilt after Ur III, the architectural information provided was based on remains from the Ur III period. The rectangular temple measured about 45×21 m with one entrance on the northeast wall and one entrance on the southwest wall. Floors were paved with baked-brick square bricks with size of 37 cm. 2 substructures built beneath the paved floor with 1.3 m elevation. Walls that the thickness varied from 3.35 to 3.95 m were constructed with straw-tempered unbaked bricks and mud mortar. There was no indication for windows walls above floor level were not preserved but windows were required for additional lighting in the Temple of Enlil. The possible height of the walls was 13.2 m as it was three times of the substructure which is 4.40 m. Although no remains of the roof left, purlins and reeds were covered first and then rammed earth mixed with straw was layered.

From the floor plan of the Temple of Enlil in Ur III period, 2 cellae each connected with 2 minor chambers with wider doorways (2.40 m, 1.45 m for normal doorway) and 2 subsidiary chambers were presented. The burning evidence in the cella (room 13) and the minor chambers (room 16,17) adjacent to the other cella (room 18), the inscription of the Temple of Enlil around Ur III period; both indicated the purpose of the Temple of Enlil was to feed gods on the adjacent ziggurat, as 'kitchen temple', so food preparation could be taken place. Other than that, the Temple of Enlil shown no place of a dais for enthroned deities. Thus, the Temple of Enlil was not for worshiping. Yet, religious ritual related to divine repast perhaps libation, could serve as the purpose of Temple of Enlil during Ur III period.

=== Temple of Gula ===
In 1990 Oriental Institute excavators identified a building in area WA as the Temple of Gula, a goddess of healing and consort of Ninurta. The earliest identified construction of the temple was in the Isin-Larsa period, with major rebuilds in the Kassite, Neo-Assyrian, and Neo-Babylonian periods. It is thought that the missing temple of Ninurta is nearby.

=== Murashu archive ===
Almost directly opposite the temple, a large palace was excavated, apparently of the Seleucid period, and in this neighborhood and further southward on these mounds large numbers of inscribed tablets of various periods, including temple archives of the Kassite and commercial archives of the Achaemenid Empire, were excavated. The latter, the "books and papers" of the house of Murashu, commercial agents of the government, throw light on the condition of the city and the administration of the country in the Achaemenid period. The tablets date between 454 BC and 404 BC with the majority between 440 BC and 414 BC. The archive is reflective of a diverse populace as one-third of contracts depict non-Babylonian names. Enduring for at least three successive generations, the house of Murashu capitalized on the enterprise of renting substantial plots of farmland having been awarded to occupying Persian governors, nobility, soldiery, probably at discounted rates, whose owners were most likely satisfied with a moderate return. The business would then subdivide these into smaller plots for cultivation by indigenous farmers and recent foreign settlers for a lucrative fee. The house of Murashu leased land, subdivided it, then subleased or rented out the smaller parcels, thereby simply acting as an intermediary. It thereby profited both from the collected rents and percentage of amassed credit reflective of that year's future crop harvests after supplying needed farming implements, means of irrigation, and paying taxes. In 423/422 BC, the house of Murashu took in "about 20,000 kg or 20,000 shekels of silver". "The activities of the house of Murashu had a ruinous effect upon the economy of the country and thus led to the bankruptcy of the landowners. Although the house of Murashu loaned money to the landowners initially, after a few decades it began more and more to take the landowners' place, and the land began to concentrate in its hands."

=== Site TA ===
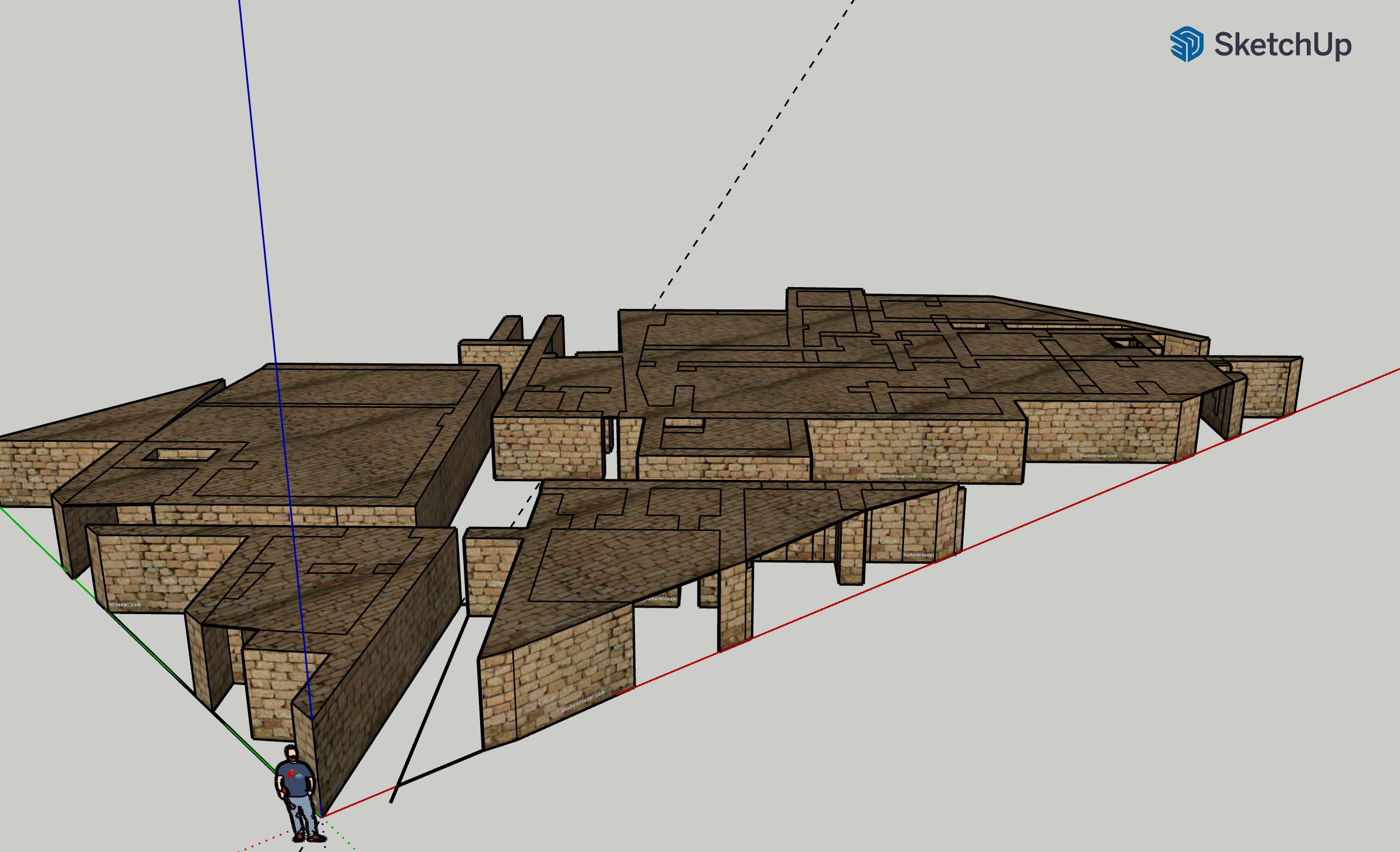
3-D reconstruction of Site TA by Akitalwt

Site TA is a 20 m × 40 m area located in Tablet Hill in Nippur. It is built in between 1948 and 1952 and was partially abandoned due to economic crisis in 1739 B.C. and fully vacated in 1720 B.C. It served as a small community with residential buildings and some minor public infrastructures at that time. TA is full of small size, irregular buildings which create a community as a whole. Houses found in TA are generally one-story which is a common feature at that period of time. Only three of the houses have a stair to the upper level but it is not considered a two-story but rooftop level.

There are total of 1.591 tablets found in site TA. Regarding the texts type found in tablets are divided into two main categories, private documents and educational material, TA is viewed as a residential area. Most of the houses in TA are residential housing while only one of the houses (House F) are viewed as scribal school, this conclusion is made due to the significant amount of 1,407 tablets are found in House F. Moreover, organic materials were found in some of the houses, therefore, there might be animal husbandry. Moreover, due to the contents of tablets, it is believed that TA is owned by small private owner.

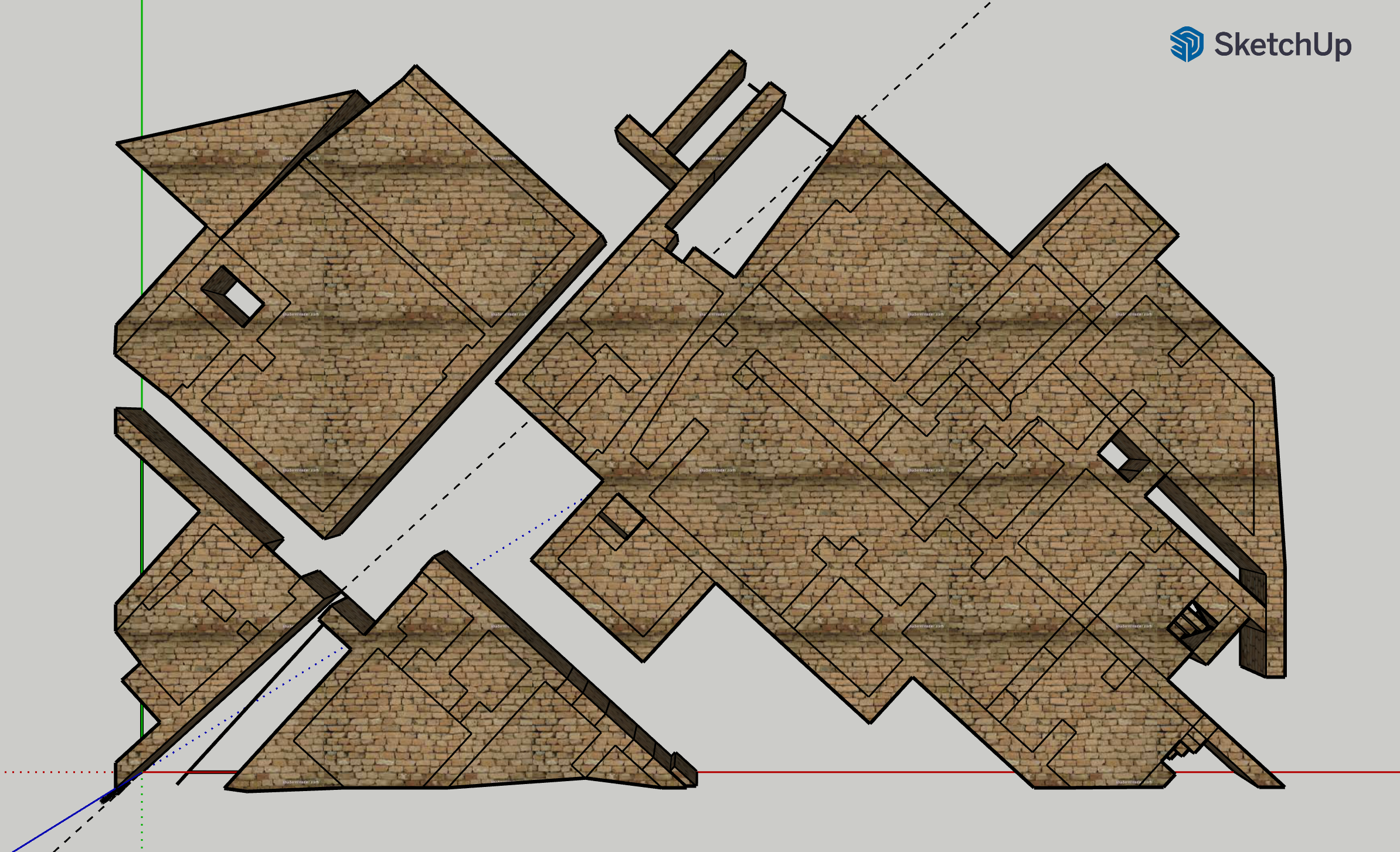
3-D reconstruction of Site TA by Akitalwt

=== Inanna Temple ===
Inanna (Inanna of Duranki) temple is a historical hallmark of Mesopotamia. Though the temple was a religious element in the dynasty of Ur, there were a lot of political and social issues associated with the temple. The excavations that led to the discovery of the remains of the temple of Nippur were conducted by Donald McCown in 1952. The temple was then excavated between 1954 and 1958, reaching the Early Dynastic II period level. In 1960-1961 the Early Dynastic I (with a large building on same plan) and then Jemdat Nasr and Uruk Period (private houses) levels were reached. Finds included a macehead of Naram-Sin, ruler of the Akkadian Empire, indicating he had rebuilt the temple. During the excavation, the team inadvertently experienced difficulty progressing with their work. The excavators reached a surface that appeared like a baked brick pavement. Notably, this incident drew a lot of interest in the team, and with further progress, they reached what seemed to be a room. Further into their excavation, they discovered a room with inscriptions, suggesting that the building was a temple built by Sulgi, the second king of the third dynasty of Ur. However, the architectural plan of the temple is further demonstrated by the layers of the building. During the excavation, it was noted that the building had twenty-three-level layers. The excavators revealed that each of the twenty-three layers serves a different purpose. For instance, levels VIII-VII were associated with sculptures and idols used in the temple's religious activities. On the temple's exterior, the excavators found that it was characterised by niches that supported the religious activities at the temple. The niches had special tablets inscribed with literature regarding the teachings at the temple. The Inanna temple had significant political influence in the Ur dynasty. It was built, supported by Sulgi and many subsequent kings, using it as a pedestal to manage the leadership of the dynasty. The temple had specific administrative units that were answerable to the reigning king of the dynasty. This could be attributed to the fact that the leading goddess of the temple, Inanna, was associated with power. Kings believed that the Inanna goddess has the power to influence political issues, which explained the temple's importance and long-lasting popularity throughout the dynasties.

== Nearby sites ==
=== Drehem ===
Drehem or ancient Puzrish-Dagan, sometimes called a suburb of Nippur, is the best-known city of the so-called redistribution centers of the Ur III period. It is located some ten kilometers south of Nippur. Witnessed by thousands of cuneiform tablets, livestock (cattle, sheep, and goats) of the state was centralized at Drehem and redistributed to the temples, its officials and the royal palaces of Sumer. The temples of nearby Nippur were the main destinations of the livestock. The city was founded by Shulgi, king of Ur. Some of its cuneiform archives are at the Royal Ontario Museum, Toronto.

=== Tell Dlehim ===
The nearby site of Dlehim (Dulaihim, Delehem, Dlehem, Dlihim) is about 40 hectares in area, separated in eastern and western sections by an ancient 50 meter wide canal bed, and currently described as being 2.5 meters in height. It lies about 21 kilometers south of Nippur and about ten kilometers south of Drehem. The site was visited by John Punnett Peters in 1889 and (believing it was Drehem) by Edgar James Banks in 1903. It was first examined (along with Drehem) in 1925 by Raymond P. Dougherty on behalf of the American Schools of Oriental Research. The mound at the time rose to 25 feet above the plain and was fairly unremarkable with some baked bricks and flint saw-blades. In the 1970s the site was examined as part of an Oriental Institute regional survey. The site was described as being 700 meters by 630 meters and rising to a height of 18 meters in the west-southwest and that "poor drainage and high soil salinity make collecting conditions generally poor". Pottery shards showed that primary occupation was in the Early Uruk and Jemdet Nasr periods with occupation continuing in the Akkadian Empire, Ur III and Isin-Larsa periods.

In modern times it was surveyed by H. Fujii of the Kokushikan University of Tokyo in 1988. In the early days of archaeology it was often confused with the nearby Drehem. It covers an area of 36 hectares and was occupied in the Ur III period. The site has been suggested as the location of ancient Tummal (thought to be the source of the Tummal Inscription). Tummal played a primary political role in the Ur III period. In 2016 the QADIS survey project, carried out an aerial and surface survey of the site. Four bricks (three re-used for a later drain and one in a temple area) of Ur III ruler Amar-Sin were found at the site. Extended traces of Ur III period buildings including an oval temple with central terrace were detected by drone flights and surface surveys. The presence of modern military berms were also noted. The Qadis survey, through imagery and sounding, determined that the site had a 150 meter by 80 meter harbor. In 2019 the Oriental Institute of Chicago received permission to excavate at Dlehim and in 2022 preliminary excavation began.

=== Tell Waresh 2 ===
The site of Tell Waresh 2 (first called Tell Hindi2 because it is located about 1 kilometer north-west of Tell Hindi, later named after Tūlūl Werrish which lies 3 kilometers to the southwest) lies 12 kilometers northeast of Nippur (UTM 38 S 532261.73 m E, 3561401.12 m N) and was subject to a rescue excavation in 1990 led by Muhammad Yahya Radhi on behalf of the Iraqi State Board of Antiquities and Heritage. It was one of a number of rescue excavation in response to the digging of the Main Drain Canal project. The site showed outlines of buildings and many artifacts on the surface. Remains were of the Isin-Larsa period and included terracotta plaques, figurines, clay sealings, cylinder seals, and a number of cuneiform tablets, mainly legal documents. The most prominent of the latter were 29 tablets found in a clay jar which contained year names of four rulers of Larsa, Abi-Sare, Sumu-el, Nur-Adad, and Sin-Iddinam (1785 BC to 1778 BC). The same team revisted the site in 2019 as part of larger survey in the area, obtaining georeferenced data. A final report is now in progress.

== See also ==
- Cities of the ancient Near East
- Chronology of the ancient Near East
- Garden of the gods (Sumerian paradise)
- Lu-diĝira
- Dūr-Abī-ešuḫ
