= Lu-diĝira =

Sumerian nobleman and poet

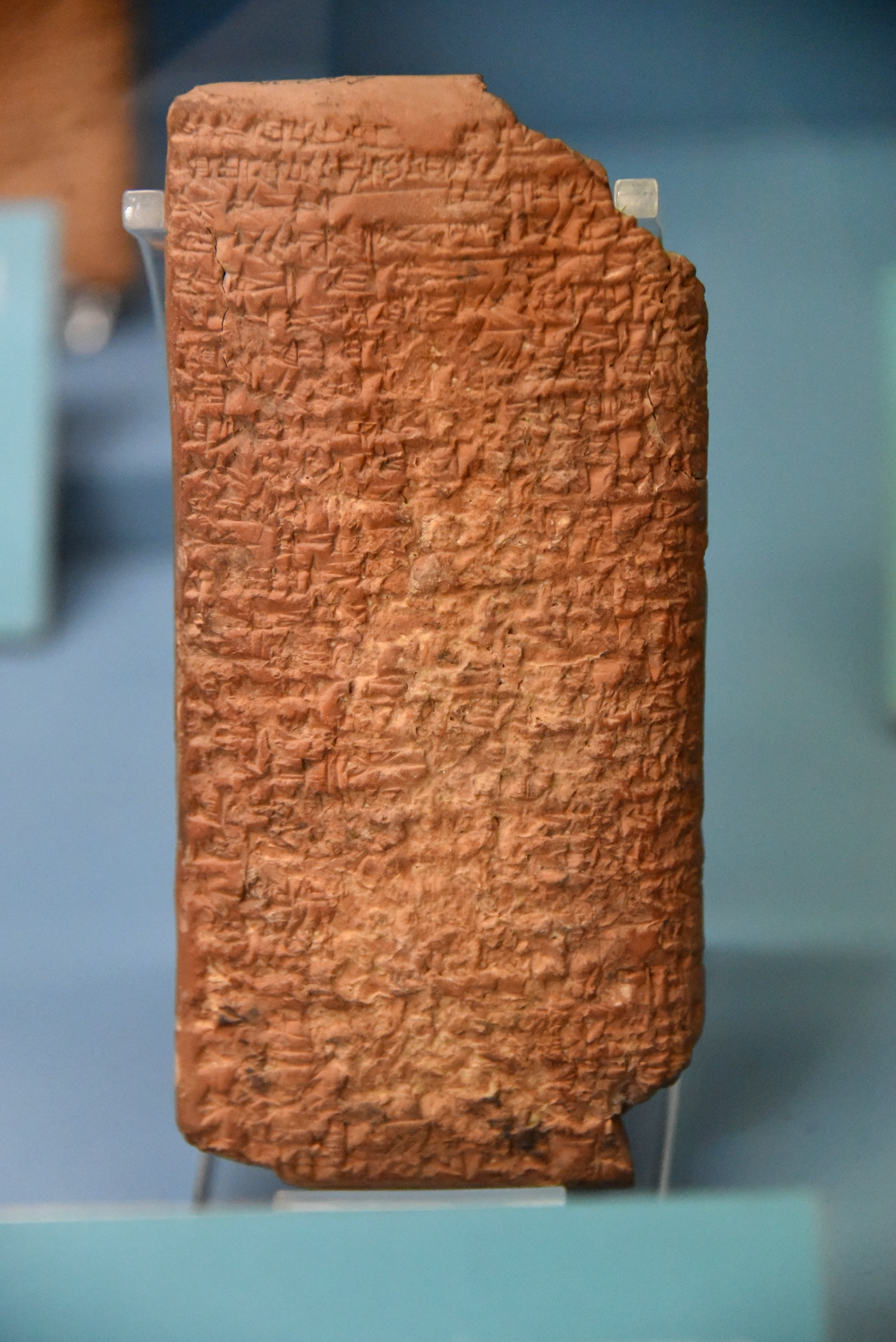
The letter of Ludingirra to his mother. Terracotta tablet. From Nippur, Iraq. Circa 1700 BCE. Ancient Orient Museum, Istanbul

Lu-diĝira was a Sumerian nobleman and poet of Nippur who dedicated a love poem to his mother and two elegies to his father and wife. The eulogies with which he glorifies his mother have been compared to the Song of Songs.
