= Neel =

Neel may refer to:

== Given name ==
- Neel Doff (1858–1942), Dutch author
- Neel E. Kearby (1911–1944), military pilot
- Neel Jani (born 1983), Swiss race car driver
- Neel Kashkari, Interim Assistant Secretary of the Treasury for Financial Stability
- Neel Reid (1885–1926), architect

== Surname ==
- Alice Neel (1900–1984), American portrait painter
- Boyd Neel (1905–1981), English conductor and academic
- David Neel, a Canadian writer, photographer, and artist
- Elizabeth Neel (born 1975), artist
- Ingrid Neel (born 1998), Estonian tennis player
- Prashanth Neel (born 1980), Indian film director
- Roy Neel, politician
- Troy Neel (born 1965), professional baseball player

== Néel as a surname ==
- Alexandra David-Néel (1868–1969), a French explorer, anarchist, spiritualist, and writer
- Louis Néel (1904–2000), a French physicist who received the 1970 Nobel prize
  - Néel temperature, at which an antiferromagnetic material becomes paramagnetic

== Locations ==
- Neel, Alabama, an unincorporated community in Morgan County, Alabama, United States
- Neel (village), in Jammu and Kashmir, India

== Other uses ==
- Nila (Ramayana) or Neel, a monkey character in the ancient Indian epic Ramayana
- Alice Neel (documentary) film about painter Alice Neel
- Neel (Star Wars), a fictional character from Star Wars: Skeleton Crew
- Nil, also transliterated neel, 10^{13} in the Indian numbering system
- Neel Trimarans, a multihull sailboat company founded and managed by Eric Bruneel and based in La Rochelle, France

== See also ==
- Neele, a surname
- Nila (disambiguation)
- Nil (disambiguation)
- Neel Kamal (disambiguation)
- Neel Akasher Neechey, 1958 Indian Bengali-language film
