= Sasthamcotta Sree Dharma Sastha Temple =

Hindu temple in Kerala, India

- Dharma Sastha Temple, Sasthamkotta, Kollam, Kerala

Religion
- Affiliation: Hinduism
- District: Kollam
- Deity: Sree Dharma Sastha
- Festivals: Utsavam (annually)

Location
- Location: Sasthamkotta
- State: Kerala
- Country: India
- Interactive map of Sasthamcotta Sree Dharma Sastha Temple
- Coordinates: 9°02′30.1″N 76°37′46.9″E

Architecture
- Type: Kerala style architecture

Specifications
- Temple: One
- Elevation: 42.97 m (141 ft)

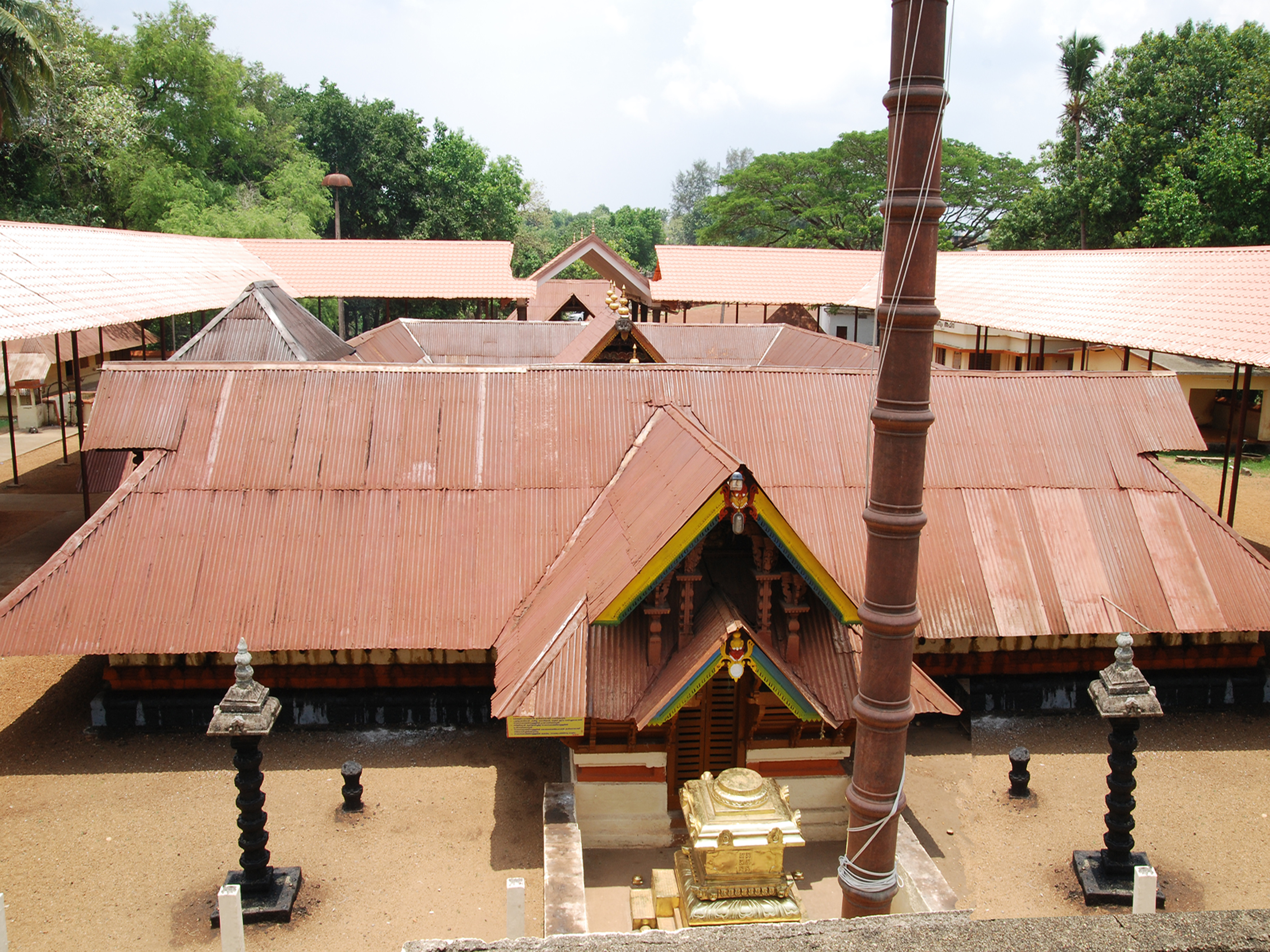
Sasthamkotta temple: Shri Dharma Sastha Temple located at Sasthamkotta

Shri Dharma Sastha temple is a Hindu temple located at the village Sasthamkotta, Kerala, India. It is surrounded on three sides by the largest fresh water lake of Kerala, Sasthamkotta lake.

The temple is well known for the population of monkeys that inhabit the premises. The temple monkeys are believed to be holy. In 1996 a trust fund was founded to ensure the monkeys would continue to be fed, even when natural food supplies dwindled.

The Sasthamcotta temple is one among the five ancient Sastha temples in Kerala - AchanKoil, Aryankavu, Kulathupuzha, Sasthamcotta and Sabarimala. The concept of Dharma Sastha represents the unison of Vaishnava and Saiva beliefs.

The presiding deity of the temple is Shri Dharma Sastha, accompanied by his consort ‘Prabha’ and son ‘Sathyaka’.

== Legend ==
The legend of this temple stretches beyond the period of the Ramayana (Treta Yuga). It is believed that Shri Rama along with his wife Sita, brother Lakshmana and the whole vaanara sena, on their way back to Ayodhya after the victory over Ravana, visited Sasthamcotta to pay their reverence to Shri Dharma Sastha. Shri Rama offered pithru tharpan on the banks of the Sasthamcotta Lake, the water of which is supposed to be identical to Surya Raga Theertha of Manasa Sarovar. Lord Rama then deputed the chief architect of his vanara (monkey) team, Neelan to serve his host. Neelan is believed to be the predecessor of the prevailing monkey clan in this temple.

== Festivals ==
=== Utsavam (annual festival) ===
The utsavam lasts for ten days. The flag is hoisted on the first day heralding the utsavam. The utsavam culminates with the ‘araattu’ on ‘Utram’ in the month of Kumbham (February–March). The tenth day hosts the ‘Kettukazhcha’—a procession of various effigies of bullocks, horses, decorated chariots, etc. -- A number of elephants with their nettipattam (decorative head-dress) also come to the temple to pay reverence to the prime deity, who sits atop a caparisoned elephant at the temple courtyard, escorted with many other decorated elephants.

=== Religious Festivals ===
- Thiruvonam
- Navaratri
- Mandala Mahotsav (41 days)
- Makara Sankrama pooja
- Sivaratri
- Painkuni Utram
- Pathamudayam
- Karkidaka Vavu

== See also ==
- List of Hindu temples in Kerala
- Ammachiveedu Murti Temple
