= Nil (Iraq) =

City of medieval Iraq

Coordinates: 33°21′N 44°26′E

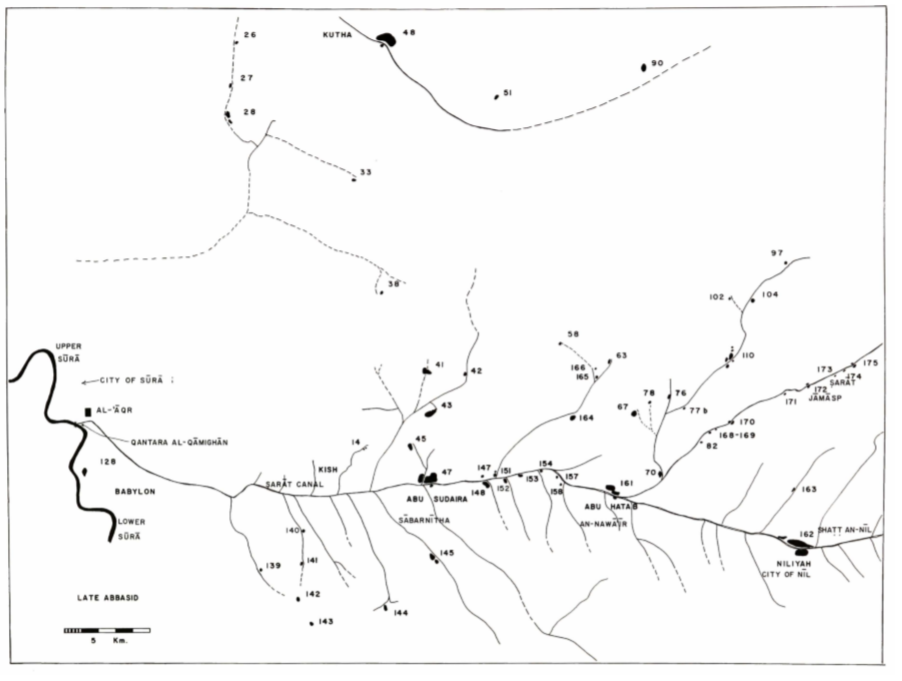
Map by McGuire Gibson showing an-Nil as well as other archaeological sites in the area.

an-Nīl was a city of medieval Iraq, located at the modern site of Niliyah. It was founded by Al-Hajjaj ibn Yusuf, the Umayyad governor of Iraq, on the canal known as the Shatt en-Nil, which was named after the Nile river. Both the canal and the city were built as part of a land reclamation project intended to increase the population of the area.

In the late 10th century, the Christian bishopric of Nippur, 50 km to the southeast, was relocated to Nīl.

Nīl survived the Mongol conquest of Iraq in 1258 and continued to flourish for nearly a century thereafter, even while most other settlements in the area declined. It appears to have been abandoned around 1350.

The ruins at Niliyah show that medieval Nīl was a large city, with settlement on both sides of the Shatt en-Nil for over 1 km. A bridge made of baked bricks, identified as the Qanṭara al-Māsī, joined the two sides. To the southeast were a brick factory and a small square tomb.

== Sources ==
- Adams, Robert M. (1981). Heartland of Cities. Chicago: University of Chicago Press. ISBN 0-226-00544-5.
- El-Babour, Mansour M. (1981). Urban Networks in Eastern Abbasid Lands: An Historical Geography of Settlement in Mesopotamia and Persia, Ninth- and Tenth-Century A.D. University of Arizona
- Gibson, McGuire (1972). The City and Area of Kish. Miami: Field Research Projects. pp. 53–55, 155. Archived from the original on 2020-07-14.
- Le Strange, Guy (1905). The Lands of the Eastern Caliphate: Mesopotamia, Persia, and Central Asia, from the Moslem Conquest to the Time of Timur. Cambridge: Cambridge University Press. OCLC 458169031.
