= Neel (village) =

Village in Jammu and Kashmir

- Interactive map of Neel
- Coordinates: 33.47507°N 75.21986°E
- Country: India
- Territory: Jammu and Kashmir
- District: Ramban district
- Tehsil: Banihal tehsil

Neel is a village and niabat located in the Banihal tehsil of Ramban district in the Indian union territory of Jammu and Kashmir. It is situated approximately 40 kilometres from the sub-district headquarters, Ramsoo. It is known for Neel Top, a meadow in upper area of Neel.

Neel lies in the north-western Himalayas, in the upper reaches of Ramban district. It falls under the jurisdiction of medical block Ukhral.

== Neel Banihal ==
Neel Top is the upper meadows of Neel area which is located at an elevation of around 2000 metres, is a prominent point in the Pir Panjal range. It can be accessed via two main routes originating from Chamalwas and Magarkote, both situated along the Jammu–Srinagar National Highway (NH-44). It acts as a base for several trekking expeditions into the Pir Panjal range. Popular trekking routes from Neel Top include Wasa Marg, Ejan-tragh, Chang Top, Hals-Dhar, Bari-naal, Zaradi, Devita-Dhar, Wanbara, Hansraj Pass, Perhinder, Daganbass, Sargali, Yamul Top, Mayalsar, and Nandimarg.
