= Jack Neale =

English footballer (1917–1977)

Personal information
- Full name: Charles Roy Neale
- Date of birth: 11 February 1917
- Place of birth: London, England
- Date of death: 16 December 1977 (aged 60)
- Position: Defender

Senior career*
Years	Team	Apps	(Gls)
- Walton & Hersham

International career
1948	Great Britain	4	(0)
- * Club domestic league appearances and goals

Charles Roy Neale (11 February 1917 – 16 December 1977), known as Jack Neale, was an English footballer who represented Great Britain at the 1948 Summer Olympics. A defender, Neale played amateur football for Walton & Hersham.

In 1938 he appeared for the Civil Service team against the Royal Air Force; his work place was described as "Woking Post Office".
