= Nil (given name) =

Nil is a unisex given name. Notable people with the name include:

- Nil Burak (born 1948), Turkish Cypriot pop singer and actress
- August Emil Fieldorf ("Nil"; 1895–1953), Polish brigadier general
- Nil Filatov (1847–1902), Russian pediatric
- Nil Hilevich (1931–2016), Belarusian poet
- Nil Izvorov (1823–1905), Bulgarian priest
- Nil Karaibrahimgil (born 1976), Turkish singer and songwriter
- Nil Khasevych (1905–1952), Ukrainian artist and political figure
- Nil Köksal, Turkish-born Canadian television journalist
- Nil Lushchak (born 1973), Ukrainian bishop
- Nil Maizar (born 1970), Indonesian football team manager
- Nil Mısır (born 1987), Turkish para archer
- Nil Montserrat (born 1988), Spanish racing driver
- Nil de Oliveira (born 1986), Brazilian-Swedish athlete
- Nil Riudavets (born 1996), Spanish paratriathlete
- Nil Ruiz (born 2003), Spanish football player
- Nil Solans (born 1992), Spanish rally driver
- Nil Yalter (born 1938), Turkish artist
