= Shatt en-Nil =

Ancient Babylonian canal in southern Iraq

The Shatt en-Nil (also Shatt al-Nil) is a dry river bed/canal in southern Iraq. It is also known as the Naru Kabari.

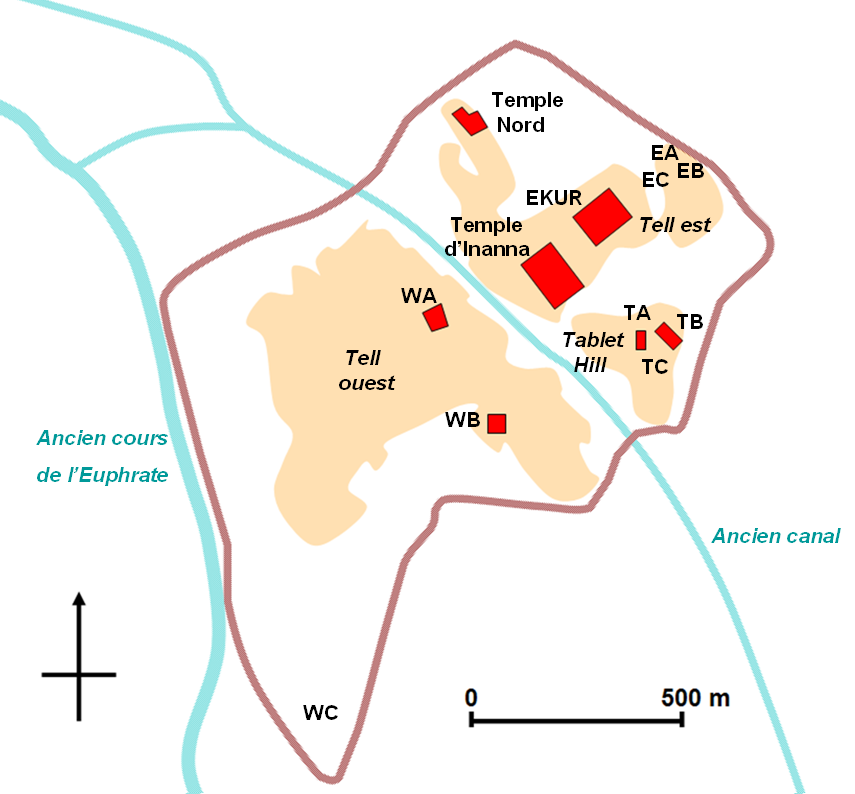
Map of the Shatt en-Nil through Nippur

Called the Euphrates of Nippur, the river was an important irrigation and transport infrastructure for the city of Nippur during antiquity. The canal started just north of Babylon and travelled for 60 km ending at Larsa where it rejoined the Euphrates River. On the way, it flowed through Nippur (32.55°N 44.42°E 34m). The canal also serviced the city of Tel Abib and Uruk.

The canal is referred to in the so-called Murashu documents discovered at Nippur which record business transactions in the area around Nippur. The river/canal has also been one of the rivers identified as the biblical River Chebar.(כְּבָר [נְהַר)

== See also ==
- Iturungal canal
