= Nil (surname) =

Nil is a surname. Notable people with the surname include:

- Alain De Nil (born 1966), Belgian football player
- Eva Nil (1909–1990), Egyptian-born Brazilian film actress
- Lon Nil (died 1970), Cambodian political figure
- Maxi Nil (born 1981), Greek singer
