= Sasthamkotta =

Sasthamkotta Sasthamcotta
- Village
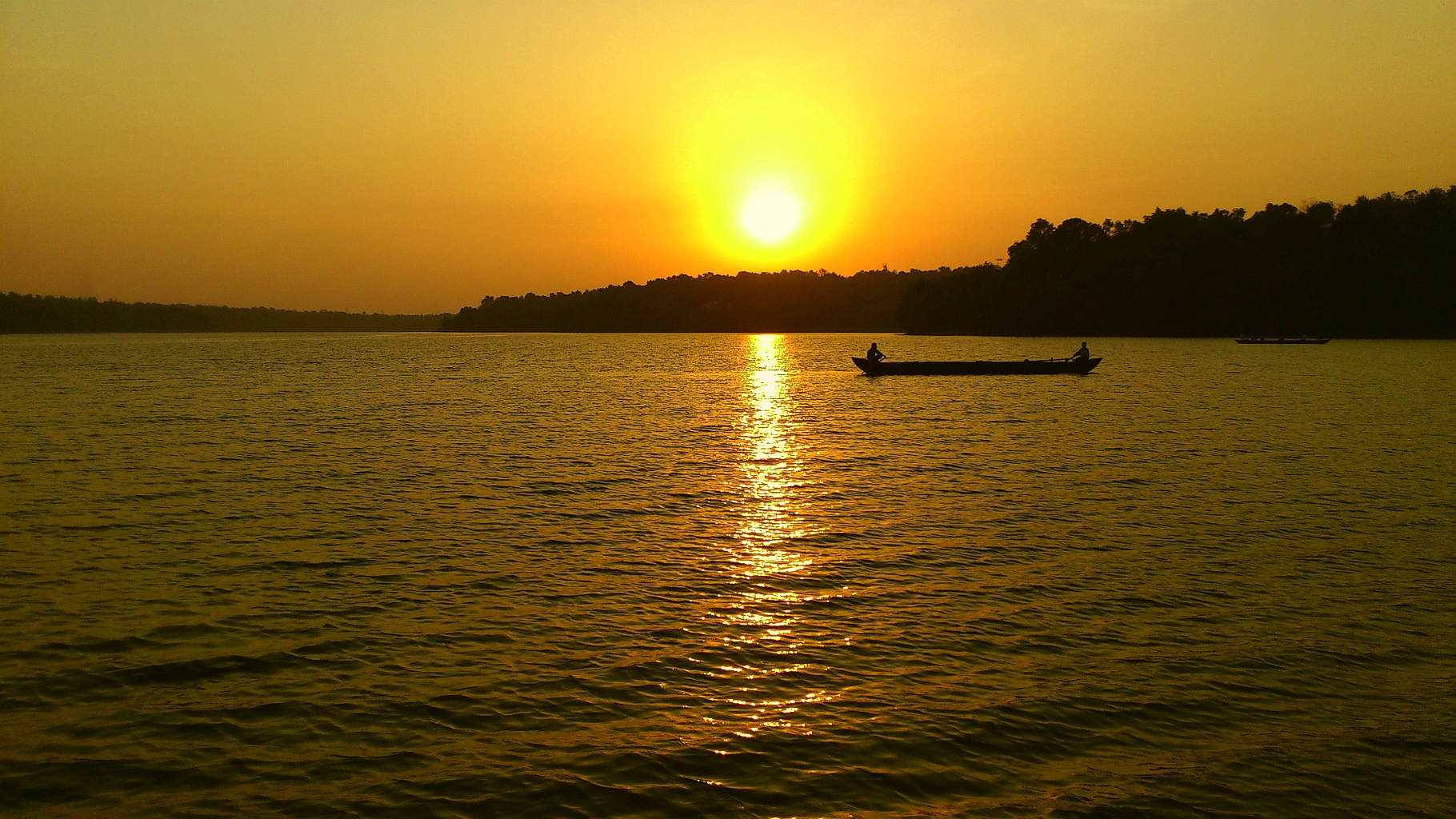
- Evening at Sasthamcotta Lake

- Sasthamcotta, Kollam, Kerala
- Coordinates: 9°02′11.4″N 76°37′26.0″E
- Country: India
- State: Kerala
- District: Kollam
- Elevation: 22.19 m (72.8 ft)

Population (2011)
  - Total: 33,285

Languages
  - Official: Malayalam, English
- Time zone: UTC+5:30 (IST)
- PIN: 690521
- Telephone code: +91476xxxxxxx
- Vehicle registration: KL-61
- Nearest city: karunagappally, Adoor, Kottarakkara, Kollam
- Vidhan Sabha constituency: Kunnathur
- Website: www.sasthamcotta.com

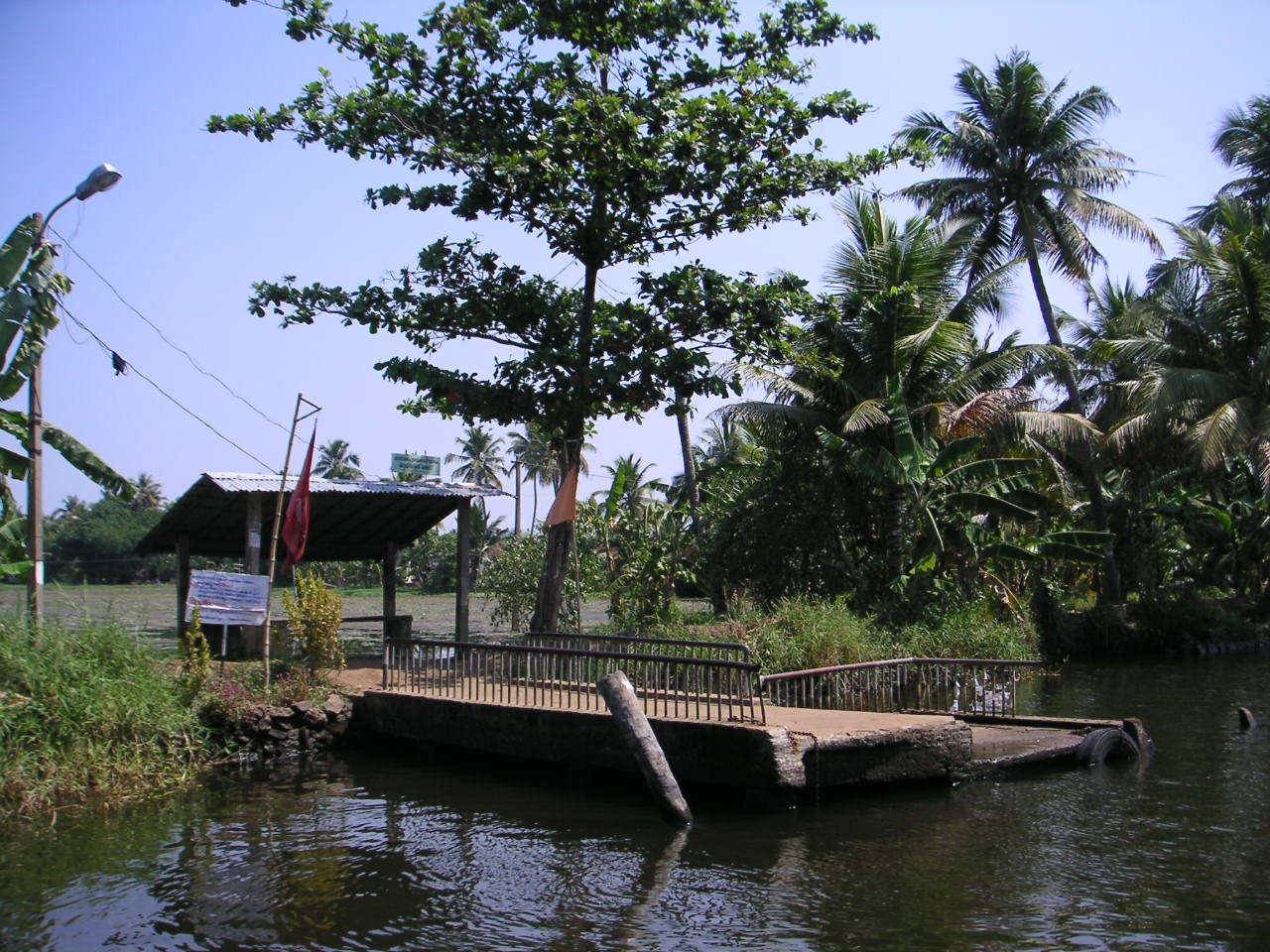
Sasthamkotta boat jetty

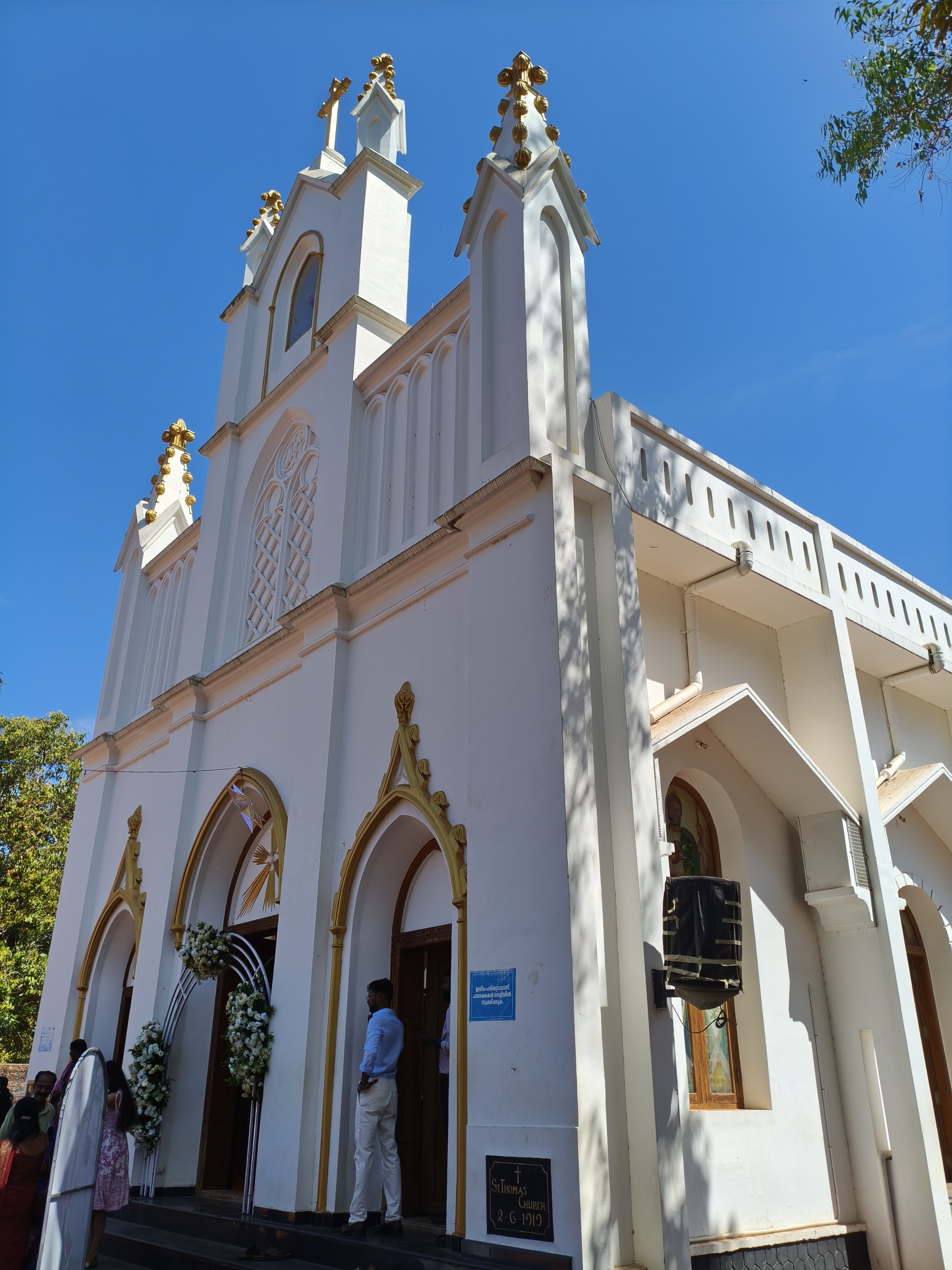
St Thomas Roman Catholic Church, a landmark near the lake.

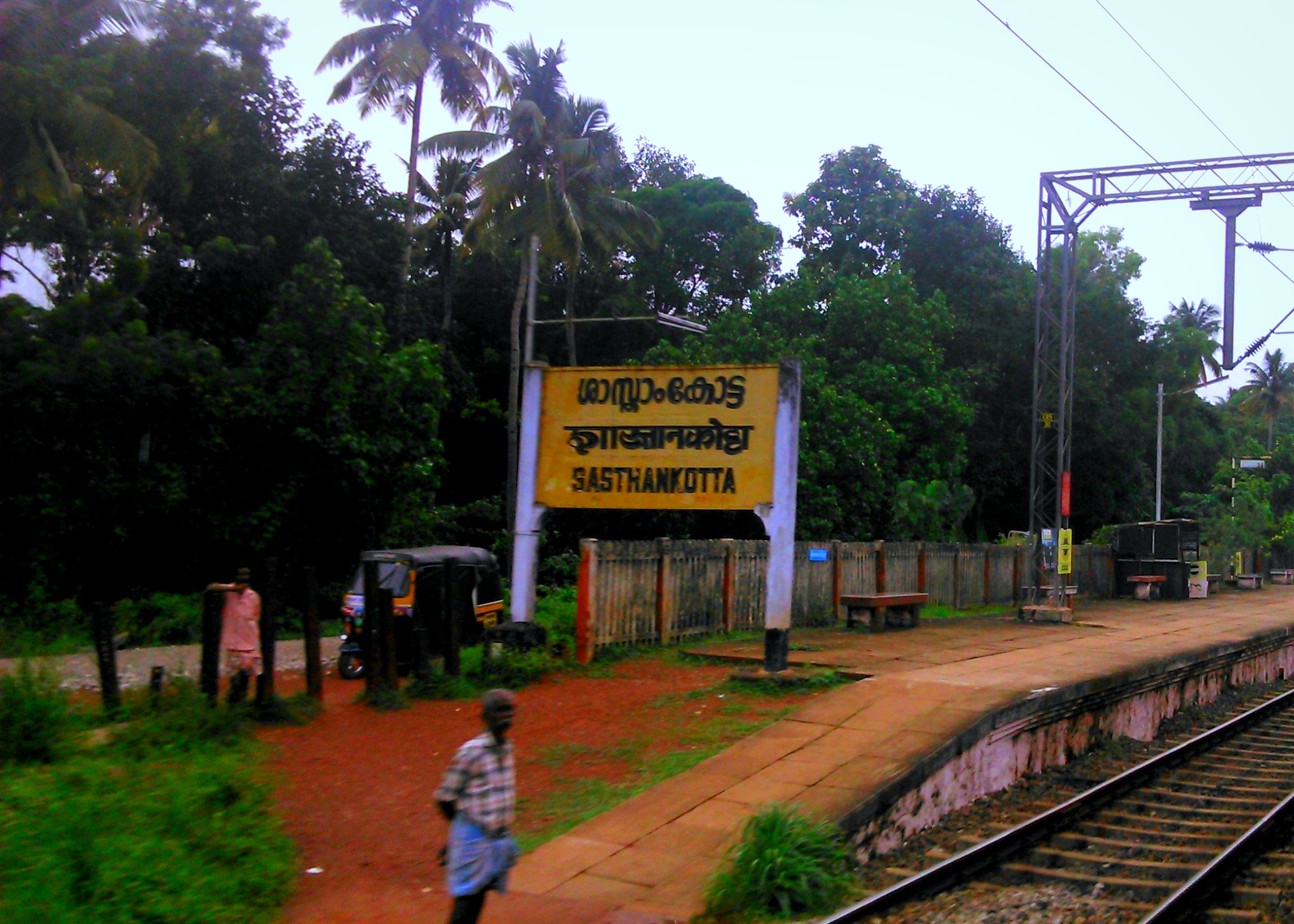
Sasthamkotta Railway Station

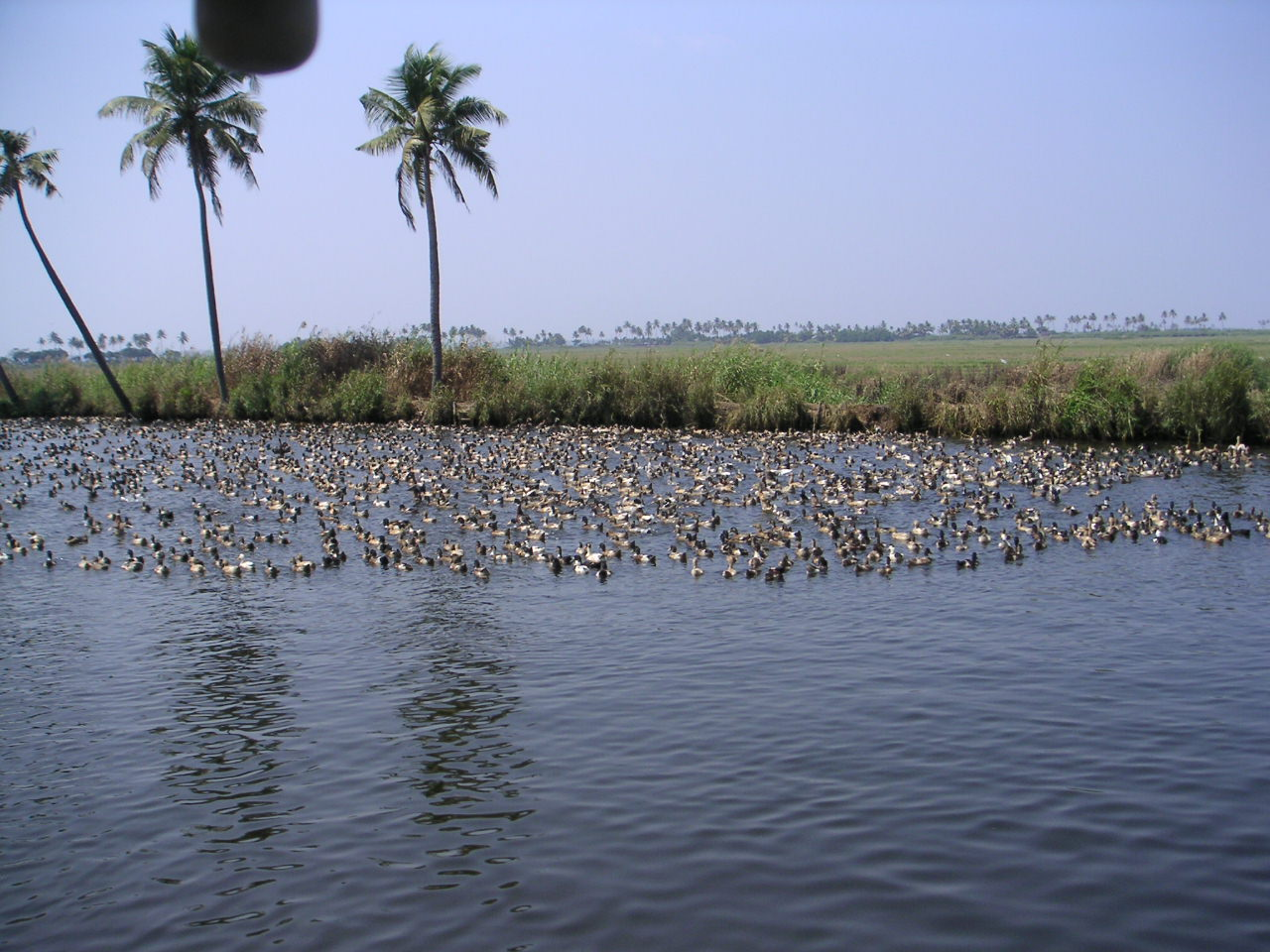
Sasthamkotta Lake

Sasthamkotta or Sasthamcotta is a village in the Kunnathur Taluk of Kollam district in the state of Kerala, India. Kunnathur taluk headquarters is located at Sasthamkotta.

== Location ==
Sasthamcotta is 25 kilometres (16 mi) from Kollam, the district headquarters, a few kilometres from Adoor municipality, 18 kilometres (11 mi) and 10 kilometres (6.2 mi) from Karunagappalli town and 42 kilometres (26 mi) away from Paravur. It is the location of the Sasthamcotta Sree Dharma Sastha Temple.

== Sasthamcotta Sree Dharmasastha Temple ==
The temple is dedicated to Sree Dharmasastha(Lord Ayyappa) and the surroundings of the temple are covered by hills and forests. One of the features of the Sasthamcotta temple is the abundance of monkeys that camp around, which are considered holy. It is believed that Lord Hanuman at the time flying to Lanka in search of Goddess Sita, halted at this place also, and since then this Temple is a home for Monkeys. The monkeys are devotee-friendly, and the thousands of devotees visiting the temple take pleasure in feeding these monkeys with nuts and fruits.

== Demographics ==
As of 2011 India census, Sasthamkotta had a population of 33,285 with 15,870 males and 17,415 females.

== Notable people ==
- K. R. Meera, author known for her novel Aarachaar
- Abdul Nasser Mahdani, politician and Islamic cleric; founder of the Peoples Democratic Party (PDP)
- P. Balachandran, film writer and actor
