= Neelan =

Neelan is a name.

== People with it as a given name ==
- Neelan Tiruchelvam (1944–1999), Sri Lankan Tamil lawyer, academic, politician

== People with it as a surname ==
=== Fictional characters ===
From the British soap-opera Coronation Street

- Kelly Neelan
- Laura Neelan
- Rick Neelan

== See also ==
- Elan (disambiguation)
- Neel (disambiguation)
