= Ramsoo =

- Village
- Location in Jammu and Kashmir, India Ramsoo (India)
- Coordinates: 33.33°N 75.19°E
- Country: India
- Union Territory: Jammu and Kashmir
- District: Ramban

Population (2011)
  - Total: 1,545

Languages
  - Spoken: Hindi, Urdu
- Time zone: UTC+5:30 (IST)
- PIN: 182145

Ramsoo is a village and municipality in Ramban district of the Indian union territory of Jammu and Kashmir. The town is located 22 kilometres from the district headquarters Ramban.

== Transport ==
=== Road ===
Ramsoo is well-connected by road to other places in Jammu and Kashmir and India by the NH 44.

=== Rail ===
The nearest major railway station to Ramsoo is Jammu Tawi railway station And udhampur railway station located at a distance of 150 kilometres.

=== Air ===
The nearest airport to Gundna is Jammu Airport located at a distance of 147 kilometres and is a 4.5-hour drive.

== Climate ==
Climate data for Ramsoo {1981–2023 via satellite based observations ( All values are rounded to the nearest integer )}
Month	Jan	Feb	Mar	Apr	May	Jun	Jul	Aug	Sep	Oct	Nov	Dec	Year
Record high °C (°F)	20 (68)	22 (72)	27 (81)	31 (88)	36 (97)	37 (99)	39 (102)	39 (102)	34 (93)	32 (90)	27 (81)	21 (70)	50 (122)
Mean daily maximum °C (°F)	11 (52)	14 (57)	20 (68)	23 (73)	26 (79)	29 (84)	31 (88)	30 (86)	27 (81)	24 (75)	21 (70)	15 (59)	23 (73)
Mean daily minimum °C (°F)	−2 (28)	−1 (30)	2 (36)	4 (39)	8 (46)	12 (54)	16 (61)	15 (59)	12 (54)	4 (39)	1 (34)	−1 (30)	6 (43)
Record low °C (°F)	−17 (1)	−19 (−2)	−8 (18)	−4 (25)	−1 (30)	3 (37)	9 (48)	8 (46)	3 (37)	−4 (25)	−11 (12)	−13 (9)	−19 (−2)
Average rainfall mm (inches)	120 (4.7)	142 (5.6)	420 (16.5)	240 (9.4)	103 (4.1)	87 (3.4)	130 (5.1)	110 (4.3)	80 (3.1)	92 (3.6)	83 (3.3)	128 (5.0)	1,735 (68.1)
Source: India Meteorological Department

== See also ==
- Jammu and Kashmir
- Ramban district
- Ramban
