= Neale (electric car) =

Nineteenth-century Scottish electric car

The Neale electric car was made in Edinburgh, Scotland in 1897 by Douglas Neale of 21 Rutland Square, Edinburgh. The car was described as electrically driven, with a range of speed from 3 to 12 miles per hour. Only a limited number, possibly four, of these vehicles were made and none survive. The car was displayed at the 1897 Motor Car Exhibition at Crystal Palace.

Douglas Neale was an electrical engineer and inventor.

== Specification ==
=== Battery and motor ===
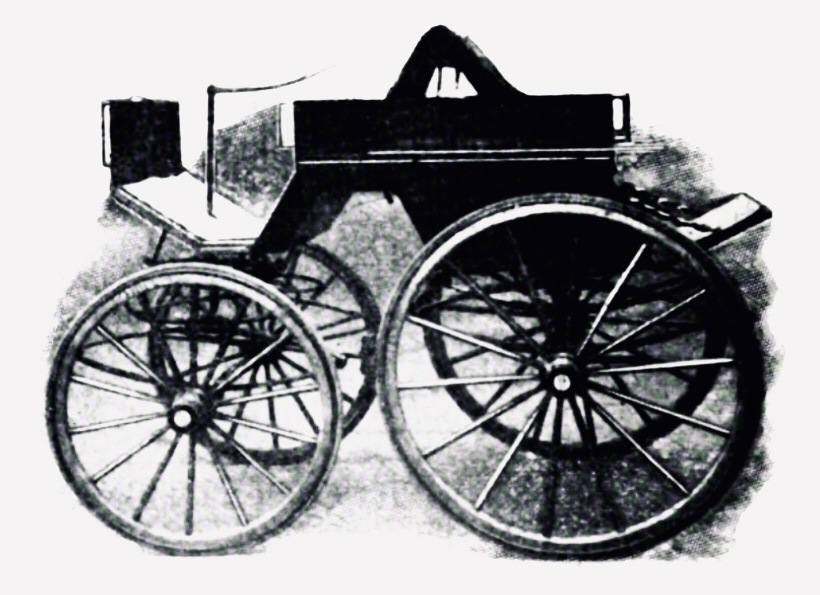
Neale (1897)

Its battery was a Planté or pure lead 15 cell. Each cell had a 115 amp hour capacity. The traction system was covered by seven patents. It was direct drive from the armature shaft on to the wheel of the vehicle.

=== Weights ===
The battery weighed 405 lbs. The car's motor was 1 bhp and weighed 100 lbs. The car itself (excluding the battery, motor, and any load) weighed 448 lbs. Its range was 35 miles at a total weight of 9 cwt.

=== Controls ===
The vehicle's steering was direct to the axle, meaning the axle moved at the same rate as the steering handle. The other driver control was a switch that enabled the driver to move either forward or back at any speed, brake, ring the electric gong, and stop. There was also a foot brake to comply with the Board of Trade regulations.

== See also ==
- Robert Davidson (inventor) Scottish creator of the first battery powered locomotive in 1842.
- List of car manufacturers of the United Kingdom
