= Shawnae =

- Pronunciation: Sha-NAH
- Gender: Female

Origin
- Origin: Irish, Gaelic, English
- Meaning: God is gracious

Other names
- Related names: Shauna, Shawna, Sean, Shawn, Shane, Shana

Shawnae or Shaunae is a feminine given name. It is a variant of Shauna/Shawna, derived from Shawn or Sean, an Irish Gaelic name. Its origin is English and means "God is Gracious". The name may refer to:

- Shawnae Dixon (born 1976), American chef and cookbook author
- Shawnae Jebbia (born 1971), American entertainer and former beauty queen
- Shaunae Miller-Uibo (born 1994), Bahamian sprinter
