= Siobhan =

Siobhán
- Pronunciation: English: /ʃɪˈvɔːn/ shih-VAWN; Irish: [ˈʃʊwaːn̪ˠ, ʃəˈwaːn̪ˠ]
- Gender: Female

Origin
- Origin: Irish and Hebrew
- Meaning: God is gracious
- Region of origin: Ireland

Other names
- Related names: Joan, Joanne, Joanna, Jane, Sinéad, Seán, Shawna, Shauna, Seána

Siobhán is an Irish female name, ultimately of Hebrew origin. The most common anglicisations are Siobhan (identical to the Irish spelling but omitting the Síneadh fada acute accent over the 'a'), Shavawn, Shebahn, Shauvan, Shevaun and Shivaun. A now uncommon spelling variant is Siubhán.

It is derived from the Anglo-Norman Jehane and Jehanne (Modern French Jeanne), which were introduced into Ireland by the Anglo-Normans in the Middle Ages. The name first appears in the surviving Irish annals in the early fourteenth century.

The name is thus a cognate of the Welsh Siân and the English Joan, derived from the Latin Ioanna and Iohanna (modern English Joanna, Joanne), which are in turn from the Greek Iōanna (Ἰωάννα). This Greek name is a feminine form of the Greek Iōannēs (Ἰωάννης), which is in turn a shortened form of the Hebrew Johanan (יוֹחָנָן Yôḥānān, a shortened form of יְהוֹחָנָן Yəhôḥānān), meaning 'God is gracious', and origin of the masculine name John and its cognates.

The popularity of the actress Siobhán McKenna (1923–1986) helped the resurgence of the name in the 20th century.

The Scottish Gaelic form of the name is Siobhàn (which is sometimes anglicised Judith).

The male Irish forms of the name are Seán and Eóin.

== People ==
- Siobhan Baillie (born 1981), British politician
- Siobhan Benita (born 1971), British politician and former civil servant
- Siobhan Brooks, American sociologist
- Siobhian Brown (born 1972), Scottish politician
- Siobhan Byrne (born 1984), German-born Irish sabre fencer
- Siobhan Chamberlain (born 1983), British footballer
- Shivaune Christina, Australian former model and Miss Earth Australia 2003
- Siobhán Cleary, Irish composer
- Siobhán Coady, Canadian politician and businesswoman
- Siobhán Creaton, Irish journalist
- Siobhán Cullen, Irish actress
- Siobhan Davies, English choreographer
- Siobhan de Maré, singer-songwriter
- Siobhan Dillon, English singer
- Siobhán Donaghy, British singer and original/current member of the Sugababes
- Siobhan Dowd, English writer
- Siobhan Fahey, Irish singer who was a member of Bananarama and Shakespears Sister
- Siobhan Fallon Hogan, American actress
- Siobhan Finneran, British actress
- Siobhán Haughey, Irish-Hong Kong swimmer and Olympic silver medalists
- Siobhan Hayes, British actress
- Siobhán Hapaska, Irish sculptor
- Siobhan Healy (born 1976), Scottish artist
- Siobhán Hoey, Irish sportswoman
- Siobhan Hunter, Scottish footballer
- Siobhán Killeen, Irish footballer
- Siobhan Leachman, New Zealand citizen scientist
- Siobhan MacGowan, Anglo-Irish singer
- Siobhan Magnus, American contestant on American Idol, Season 9.
- Siobhan Maher Kennedy, singer
- Siobhan Marshall, New Zealand actress
- Siobhán McCarthy, Irish actress of musical theater
- Siobhain McDonagh (born 1960), British Labour Party MP
- Siobhan McGarry, Northern Irish television presenter
- Siobhán McHugh, Irish-Australian author, podcaster and documentary-maker
- Siobhán McKenna, Irish, Tony Award-winning actress
- Siobhán McSweeney, Irish actress
- Siobhan Miller, Scottish folk singer
- Shevaun Mizrahi, Turkish-American documentary filmmaker
- Siobhán O'Brien, Irish singer-songwriter
- Siobhán O'Hanlon, Irish activist
- Siobhan O'Sullivan, Australian political scientist and political theorist
- Siobhán Parkinson, Irish author of several children's books, including Kathleen: The Celtic Knot
- Siobhan Paton, Australian Paralympic swimmer
- Siobhan Reddy, British video game executive
- Siobhan Redmond, Scottish actress
- Siobhan Roberts, Canadian science journalist
- Siobhan Terry, New Zealand para-cyclist
- Siobhan Thompson, CollegeHumor writer, comedian
- Siobhan Wescott, Alaskan Athabaskan educator
- Siobhan Williams, Canadian actress

== Fictional characters ==
- Siobhan, one of Christopher's teachers at school in Mark Haddon's The Curious Incident of the Dog in the Night-Time
- Siobhan, a female vampire appearing in the last book of Twilight by Stephenie Meyer
- Siobhán, a non-playable Mii opponent in the Wii series
- Siobhan Andrews, a smart third-grader in the television series Hey Arnold!
- Siobhan Beckett, a character from the science fiction series Earth: Final Conflict
- Siobhan Brody, mother of Roarke's mother in J. D. Robb's In Death novels
- Siobhan Clarke, Detective Sergeant in Ian Rankin's John Rebus novels
- Siobhan Kelly, deputy in the Cinemax series Banshee
- Siobhan Martin, one of the twin sisters portrayed by Sarah Michelle Gellar in the short-lived drama Ringer
- Siobhan McDougal, also known as Silver Banshee, a DC Comics supervillain
- Siobhan Mooney, daughter of detective Jack Mooney, a character in the TV series, Death in Paradise
- Siobhan Pattinson, one of the two main characters of the LGBT webcomic Outsiders
- Siobhan "Shiv" Roy, the daughter of patriarch Logan Roy on the HBO series Succession
- Siobhan, Cassidy's girlfriend and character from J Kenner's Stark International trilogy. Also appears in Deepest Kiss, Hold me, Wicked Grind, Sweetest Taboo and Anchor Me.
- Siobhan Ryan, daughter of Maeve and Johnny Ryan on the American daytime soap opera Ryan's Hope from 1978 to 1989
- Siobhan Sadler, also known as "Mrs. S" a foster mother to two of the main characters in the television series Orphan Black
- Siobhan Sharpe, head of brand for the Olympic Deliverance Commission in the BBC television series Twenty Twelve and a PR consultant for the BBC in the sequel W1A
- Shevaun Tillman, a character in James Clavell's novel Tai-Pan
- Siobhan O'Brien, a character in Sung J. Woo's novel Skin Deep
- Siobhán O’Sullivan, a garda in Carlene O'Connor's The Irish Village Mysteries
- Siobhan Sheehan, character in HBO series Mare of Easttown
- Siobhán, the lead character in the 2019 film, Sea Fever.
- Siobhan Kelly, a character in Beth O'Leary's The No-Show
- Siobhan Klaxon, a character in the 2022 stop-motion horror comedy film, Wendell & Wild
- Siobhán Súilleabháin, a character in the 2022 comedy-drama film, The Banshees of Inisherin
- Siobhan Corbyn, a character in the 2023 TV series "American Horror Story: Delicate"
- Siobhan O’Malley, daughter of the barkeepers in Nick Cave and the Bad Seeds song O'Malley's Bar
- Siobhan Quay, a character in the Showtime series City on a Hill
- Siobhan Harrigan, a character in the Apple TV series Ted Lasso

== Diminutive ==
Siobhán has a corresponding diminutive form, Sinéad (after French Jeannette). Examples of this name include Sinéad O'Connor.

== See also ==
- List of Irish-language given names
- Sinéad, an Irish name from French Jeannette
