= Chitlins =

Intestine soul food dish

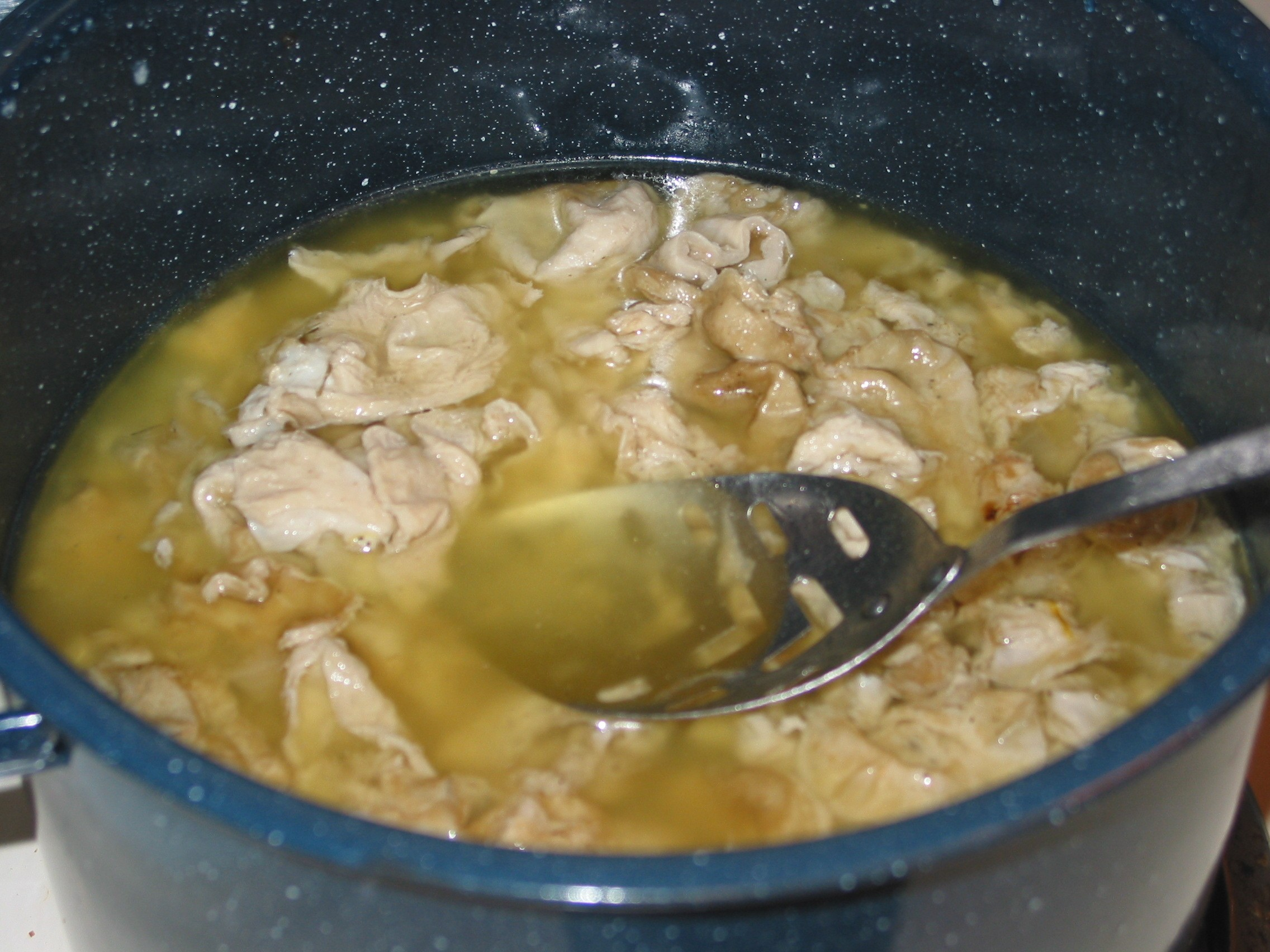
Chitterlings in broth

Chitlins (American English: /ˈtʃɪt(ər)lɪŋz/ CHIT-linz; also chit'lins, chitterlings) are an American dish made from intestines, typically the small intestine of pigs. Chitlins are an archetypal soul food.

== Preparation and consumption ==
Chitlins are traditional food of the Southern United States that spread nationwide with the Black Migration. A common practice is to place a halved onion in the pot to mitigate the very unpleasant odor that can be particularly strong when the chitterlings begin to cook. Chitterlings sometimes are battered and fried after the stewing process and commonly are served with apple cider vinegar and hot sauce as condiments.

== History ==
A common assumption is that the Southern consumption of chitterlings arose in the pre–Civil War era of slavery when less desirable parts of the pig, like pigs' feet and hog jowls, were given to slaves, while the better cuts went to the slave masters, who were thus said to be "living high on the hog". However, culinary historian Adrian Miller points out that, "Enslaved people did eat chitlins, but white people were eating them as well. In fact, if you look at slave narratives and oral histories of the era, there were quite a few references of making chitlins for the master, and eating intestines was something that was in white culture for centuries before we get to the American South. People that went on hunts would eat the intestines as prized delicacies."

Still Miller calls chitterlings "an iconic dish in African American food traditions, [with] a working-class vibe, even though the dish has shown up at high-class affairs". When plantations held early winter hog-killings, they preserved all parts of the animal that could be preserved by pickling, salting or smoking. Chitterlings, which could not be preserved, were cooked immediately as part of a post-slaughter celebration and served mainly (although not exclusively) to slaves. Because of this tie to special occasions, chitterlings have retained a role as a holiday delicacy, but gained a mixed reputation among African Americans, with some rejecting them as a relic of oppression and others embracing them as a delicacy.

In 1952's Invisible Man, novelist Ralph Ellison touched on this mixed cultural role of chitterlings among African Americans. By the 1960s the dish had become politicized among black people as a symbol both good and bad. Prominent activists from Eldridge Cleaver to Elijah Muhammad to Dick Gregory criticized chitterlings (and often soul food in general), but the dish was also seen as "a way of celebrating the resistance and spirit of survival and creativity that emerged despite the horrific history of racism in this country" in Miller's words.

In 2003, the Smithsonian Institution's Anacostia Museum and Center for African American History and Culture accepted the papers of Shauna Anderson and her restaurant, The Chitlin Market, as part of its emerging collection of materials about African American celebrations, foods and foodways. In 2007, the Prince George's County, Maryland government shut down The Chitlin Market when the restaurant's location was rezoned from commercial to residential.

== Cultural significance ==
White Southerners, especially of rural origin, have sometimes celebrated the eating of chitterlings. In the 20th century, eating clubs devoted to the dish arose in cities from Raleigh, North Carolina, to Nashville, Tennessee. The town of Salley, South Carolina, has held an annual Chitlin' Strut Festival since 1966 on the Saturday after Thanksgiving and includes a fried chitterling–eating contest.

The Chitlin' Circuit, a collection of performance venues for African Americans, is named for this "potent symbol of resilience in African American creative culture". In 1965, blues harmonica player and vocalist Junior Wells recorded a song, "Chitlin Con Carne" on his acclaimed Delmark Records album, Hoodoo Man Blues. Jazz guitarist Kenny Burrell recorded the unrelated jazz blues "Chitlins con Carne" on 1963's Midnight Blue (covered by others including Stevie Ray Vaughan and Double Trouble on The Sky Is Crying.) Other notable blues songs with references to chitlins were recorded in 1929 by Peg Leg Howell ("Chittlin' Supper"), and in 1934 by the Memphis Jug Band ("Rukus Juice and Chittlin'"). Gus Jenkins, Johnny Otis, and Arthur Williams have also recorded songs with a reference to chitlins in their title. The bluegrass standard "It's Chitlin Cooking Time In Cheatham County" takes its name from the dish and Cheatham County, Tennessee.

== See also ==
- Chitlin' Circuit
- Chunchullo (in Latin America)
- Flaki
- Gopchang
- Haggis
- Kishka (food)
- Pacha
- Sausage casing
- Tripe
