= Siân =

Given name

- Pronunciation: English: /ʃɑːn/ SHAHN; Welsh: [ʃaːn]
- Gender: Female
- Language: Welsh language

Origin
- Region of origin: Welsh cognate of Jane (Hebrew origin)

Other names
- Related names: Jane, Sheena, Siobhán

Siân (also Sian, Shân; English: /ʃɑːn/ SHAHN, Welsh: [ʃaːn]) is a Welsh feminine given name, meaning "God's gracious gift".

== List of people with the name ==
- Sian Barbara Allen (1946–2025), American film and television actress
- Sian Beilock (born 1976), American scientist
- Siân Berry (born 1974), British Green Party politician
- Sian Blake (1972–2015), British actress
- Siân Brooke (born 1980), British actress
- Siân Busby (1960–2012), British writer
- Sian Clifford (born 1982), English actress
- Shân Cothi (born 1965), Welsh singer
- Sian Eleri, Welsh radio presenter
- Sian Elias (born 1949), Chief Justice of New Zealand
- Sian Evans (born 1971), Welsh singer with Kosheen
- Sian Gibson (born 1976), Welsh comedian
- Sian Harries, Welsh writer and actor
- Sian Heder (born 1977), American filmmaker
- Sian James (disambiguation)
- Sian Kingi (1974–1987), New Zealand Australian murder victim
- Siân Lloyd (born 1958), British weather presenter
- Sian Massey-Ellis (born 1985), English football official
- Sian O'Callaghan (1988–2011), English murder victim
- Siân Phillips (born 1933), Welsh actress
- Siân Reeves (born 1966), British actress
- Sian Reese-Williams (born 1981), Welsh actress
- Sian Williams (born 1964), BBC journalist and current affairs presenter
- Siân Welby (born 1986), British radio host & TV presenter

== Fictional characters ==
- Sian Diamond in the British drama series Waterloo Road
- Sian Powers in the British soap opera Coronation Street
- Siân, character in Jacqueline Wilson's The Illustrated Mum

== See also ==
- Shon (given name) / Shôn (Welsh variant)
- Sean
