= Shauna =

- Pronunciation: Shawnah
- Gender: Female
- Language: Irish

Origin
- Meaning: "God is gracious" "Present"
- Region of origin: Ireland

Other names
- Alternative spelling: Seána, Shaunagh, Shonagh, Sháuna
- Nicknames: Shaunie, ShaSha, Una
- Derived: Shawn, Sean, John
- Related names: John, Sean, Shawn, Shane, Shana

Shauna (Irish: Seána) is an Irish female given name. It is the female version of the male names Shawn or Sean, both of which are in turn derived from John.

== People named Shauna ==
- Shauna Adix (1932–1998), American educator and administrator at the University of Utah
- Shauna Anderson, American restaurateur, author, historian, and businesswoman
- Shauna Cooper, American psychologist and academic
- Shauna Coxsey, English professional rock climber
- Shauna Cross, American roller derby athlete
- Shauna Gambill, American beauty queen
- Shauna Grant, American nude model and pornographic actress
- Shauna Green (born 1979), American basketball coach
- Shauna Howe, American murder victim
- Shauna Lawless, fantasy novelist
- Shauna Lowry, Northern Irish TV presenter
- Shauna Macdonald, Scottish actress
- Shauna MacDonald, Canadian actress and radio announcer
- Shauna Robertson, Canadian film producer
- Shauna Rohbock, American soldier, Olympic bobsledder, and former soccer player
- Shauna Rolston, Canadian cellist
- Shauna Sand, American actress and Playboy model
- Shauna Singh Baldwin, Canadian-American novelist
- Shauna Willis, Australian television presenter
