= Sean (disambiguation) =

Sean is a given name.

- List of people with given name Sean

Sean may also refer to:

- Sean (cartoonist) (1935–2005), American artist
- "Sean", song by The Proclaimers from album Sunshine on Leith
- "Sean", song by Foo Fighters from EP Saint Cecilia

== See also ==
- Shawn (disambiguation)
- Shon (disambiguation)
