= Shayn =

Shayn may refer to:

- Shayn (crater), a crater on the Moon's far side
- Shayn Solberg (born 1984), Canadian character actor in the 1997 film Air Bud

== See also ==
- Shajn, a surname
- Shane (disambiguation)
- Shayna, a given name
- Shayne (disambiguation)
