= Dashaun =

Dashaun or DaShaun is an English-language masculine given name, a combination of the element da with the given name Shaun, meaning 'God is gracious', and is often found among African Americans. It is related to the given names Deshaun and DeShawn. Notable people with the given name include:

- DaShaun Amos (born 1994), American football player
- Dashaun Mallory (born 1999), American football player
- Dashaun Phillips (born 1991), American football player
- Dashaun Wesley (born 1984), American dancer, actor, choreographer, ballroom performer, MC and commentator
- DaShaun White (born 2000), American football player
- DaShaun Wood (born 1985), American basketball player
