= Shaun =

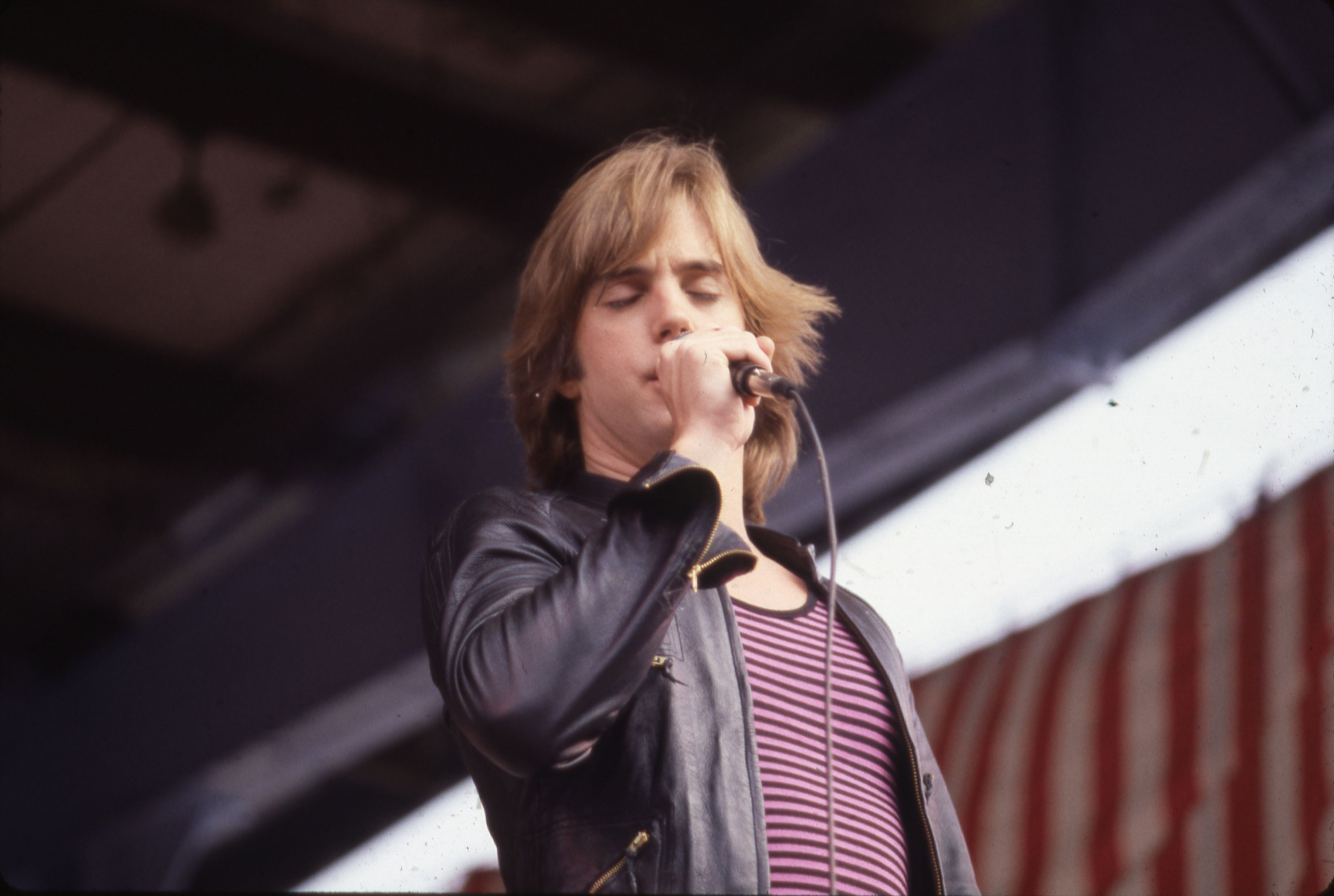
- The popularity of singer Shaun Cassidy, pictured in 1979, increased use of the name in North America in the late 1970s.
- Gender: Unisex, primarily masculine
- Language: English

Origin
- Meaning: Anglicization of Sean

Shaun is an Anglicized spelling of the Irish name Seán. Alternative spellings include Shawn, Sean, and Shawne.

Along with spelling variants Shawn and Shaun, the name was among the top 1,000 names for American boys by 1950 and, with all spellings combined, was a top 10 name for American boys in 1971. The popularity of actor Sean Connery increased use of the name. The name Shaun was popularized in the late 1970s by singer Shaun Cassidy. It has since declined in use but, with all spellings combined, remained among the 300 most popular names for newborn American boys in 2022. Shaun is also in use as a name for girls, primarily in the United States and Canada.

Notable persons with the given name include:

== People ==
- Shaun (musician) (born 1990), South Korean musician
- Shaun (YouTuber), British video essayist
- Shaun Alexander (born 1977), American football player
- Shaun Anderson (born 1994), American baseball player
- Shaun Mark Bean (born 1959), English actor known by stage name Sean Bean
- Shaun Bradley (born 1997), American football player
- Shaun Casey (1954–2024), American model
- Shaun Cassidy (born 1958), American television producer/creator, screenwriter, singer and actor
- Shaun Chamberlin, English author and activist
- Shaun Chen (born 1978), Malaysian actor
- Shaun Chen (politician) (born 1980), Canadian politician
- Shaun Clegg (born 1992), British weightlifter
- Shaun Cole (born 1963), British cosmologist
- Shaun Cole (baseball) (born 1979), American baseball coach
- Shaun Deeb, American professional poker player
- Shaun Dennis (1969–2025), Scottish football player
- Shaun Dolac (born 2001), American football player
- Shaun Donovan (born 1966), American politician
- Shaun Evans (disambiguation), multiple people
- Shaun Hart (born 1971), Australian rules footballer
- Shaun Johnson (born 1990), New Zealand rugby league footballer
- Shaun Jolly (born 1998), American football player
- Shaun King (born 1979), American writer and civil rights activist
- Shaun King (American football) (born 1977), American football player
- Shaun Livingston (born 1985), American basketball player
- Shaun Maloney (born 1983), Scottish football coach and former player
- Shaun Marsh (born 1983), Australian cricketer
- Shaun Morgan Welgemoed (born 1978), South African musician, singer, songwriter and guitarist
- Shaun Murphy (disambiguation), multiple people
- Shaun Onosa'i Vaa, American Samoan politician
- Shaun Ollison (born 1980), American model
- Shaun du Preez (born 1987), Namibian international rugby union player
- Shaun Phillips (born 1981), American football player
- Shaun Pollock (born 1973), South African cricketer
- Shaun Ricker (born 1982), American professional wrestler better known as LA Knight
- Shaun Robinson (born 1962), American television host
- Shaun Rooney (born 1996), Scottish footballer
- Shaun Ryder (born 1962), English singer, songwriter and musician
- Shaun Smith (disambiguation), multiple people
- Shaun Stafford (born 1968), American professional tennis player
- Shaun Suisham (born 1981), Canadian football player
- Shaun Tait (born 1983), Australian cricketer
- Shaun Tan (born 1974), Australian artist, writer and filmmaker
- Shaun Taylor-Corbett (born 1978), American actor, singer, and writer
- Shaun Tomson (born 1955), South African world champion surfer
- Shaun Toub (Persian: شان توب; born 1958), Iranian-born American actor
- Shaun Wade (disambiguation), multiple people
- Shaun Wallace (born 1960), English barrister and TV personality
- Shaun Weatherhead (born 1970), English footballer
- Shaun White (born 1986), American snowboarder and skateboarder
- Shaun Williams (disambiguation), multiple people
- Shaun Wilson (born 1972), Australian artist, film maker, academic and curator
- Shaun Wilson (American football) (born 1995), American football player
- Shaun Woodward (born 1958), English politician

== Fictional characters ==
- Shaun Evans (One Life to Live), on the American soap opera One Life to Live
- Shaun, a sheep from the animated television series Shaun the Sheep

== See also ==
- List of people with given name Sean
- Shawn (given name), includes a list of people named Shawn
- Shon (given name), includes a list of people named Shon
