= Shawna =

- Pronunciation: Sha-NAH
- Gender: Female

Origin
- Origin: Irish, Gaelic, English
- Meaning: God is gracious

Other names
- Related names: Shauna, Sean, Seana, Shawn, Shane, Shana

Shawna is a feminine given name. It is a variant of Shauna, derived from Shawn, an anglicisation of Seán, an Irish Gaelic name. Seán is derived from the Norman-French "Jehan" (Jean), which itself is a variant of the Biblical Hebrew name "Yohanan".

The first name has been present throughout the last century although fluctuating in use. It ranked 882nd in popularity for females of all ages in a 2000-2003 Social Security Administration statistic and 490th in a 1990 US Sample.

Shawna may refer to:

- Shawna Ann Claw, Diné politician
- Shawna Kimbrell (born 1976), American fighter pilot
- Shawna Robinson (born 1964), American stock car driver and interior designer
- Shawna Trpcic (born 1966), American costume designer
- Shawna Bullen-Fairbanks (born 2002) Ojibwe activist and advocate

== See also ==
- Shawnna (born 1978), American rapper.
