= John M. Wallace Jr. =

American sociologist

John Mckee Wallace, Jr.
- Education: University of Chicago; University of Michigan
- Scientific career
- Workplaces: University of Pittsburgh; University of Michigan
- Thesis: Black-White differences in adolescents' cigarette, alcohol, and marijuana use. (1991)

John Mckee Wallace, Jr. is an American sociologist who is the David E. Epperson Chair and Professor, Center on Race and Social Problems at the University of Pittsburgh. He also serves as Vice Provost for Faculty Diversity at the University of Pittsburgh.

== Education and early career ==
Wallace completed his undergraduate degree in sociology at the University of Chicago. He moved to the University of Michigan for his graduate studies, where he earned a doctoral degree in 1991. His doctoral research considered differences between the cigarette, alcohol and marijuana use of young people and how this was influenced by ethnicity. In 1991 Wallace was awarded an National Science Foundation postdoctoral fellowship, and remained at the University of Michigan, where he was eventually promoted to associate professor.

== Research and career ==
Wallace joined the University of Pittsburgh in 2003. Center on Race and Social Problems Comm-Univer-City of Pittsburgh project, which combines research, teaching and social work to ameliorate social problems that disproportionately impact people who are economically disadvantaged. As part of this effort, Wallace coordinates the Pitt Assisted Communities and Schools (PACS) project, which promotes community engagement of students and staff from the University of Pittsburgh with children and young people in Homewood. PACS looks to improve the physical and mental health of children and families, as well as developing their social and economic capacity. They run three main research streams, including the (i) African American parenting project, which looks to engage parents in their children's academic success, (ii) Just Discipline project, which uses an evidence-based approach to reduce exclusionary discipline in school and (iii) Justice Scholars project, which educates adolescents about social justice. Working with James Hugley, Wallace showed that Black students were in Pittsburgh were suspended at twice the rate of their white counterparts.

Alongside his work on education, Wallace leads an National Institute on Drug Abuse research programme into substance use by American adolescents. The project, Monitoring the Future, has studied the relationship between ethnicity and American adolescent substance use.

In 2015 Wallace was made a professor of business at the Joseph M. Katz Graduate School of Business. Here he established the ESTEAM (entrepreneurship, science, technology, engineering, agriculture and math) education programme for low-income African American communities. In 2020 Wallace was named Vice Provost for Faculty Diversity and Development.

== Awards and honours ==
- 2012 Marilyn J. Gittell Activist Scholar Award
- 2015 University of Pittsburgh Chancellor's Distinguished Public Service Award
- 2016 YWCA Racial Justice Award
- 2017 Martin Luther King Distinguished Individual Leadership Award
- 2019 Fellow of the American Academy of Social Work and Social Welfare

== Selected publications ==
- Wallace, John M.; Goodkind, Sara; Wallace, Cynthia M.; Bachman, Jerald G. (2008). "Racial, Ethnic, and Gender Differences in School Discipline among U.S. High School Students: 1991-2005". The Negro Educational Review. 59 (1–2): 47–62. ISSN 0548-1457. PMC 2678799. PMID 19430541.
- Bachman, J. G.; Wallace, J. M.; O'Malley, P. M.; Johnston, L. D.; Kurth, C. L.; Neighbors, H. W. (1998-12-01). "Racial/Ethnic differences in smoking, drinking, and illicit drug use among American high school seniors, 1976-89". American Journal of Public Health. 81 (3): 372–377. doi:10.2105/ajph.81.3.372. ISSN 0090-0036. PMC 1405013. PMID 1994746.
- Wallace, John M.; Bachman, Jerald G.; O'Malley, Patrick M.; Schulenberg, John E.; Cooper, Shauna M.; Johnston, Lloyd D. (2003). "Gender and ethnic differences in smoking, drinking and illicit drug use among American 8th, 10th and 12th grade students, 1976–2000". Addiction. 98 (2): 225–234. doi:10.1046/j.1360-0443.2003.00282.x. hdl:2027.42/73026. ISSN 1360-0443. PMID 12534428.

== Personal life ==
Wallace is married with four children. Since 2004 Wallace has served as Senior Pastor of the Bible Center Church. The church was founded by his grandparents, Elder Ralph and Mother Groce, in 1956. Through the church, Wallace leads Own Our Own, a start-up hub for African-American entrepreneurs. He is President of the Board of Directors of Operation Better Block, an organisation that looks to support the Homewood community through strategising and organising. In 2016, Wallace opened the Everyday Cafe, which looks to bring together the Homewood community.
