= Shawn Evans =

Shawn Evans may refer to:

- Shawn Evans (ice hockey) (born 1965), former ice hockey player and current head coach
- Shawn Evans (lacrosse) (born 1986), Canadian lacrosse player

== See also ==
- Shaun Evans (disambiguation)
- Sean Evans (disambiguation)
