= Ollison =

Ollison is a surname. Notable people with the surname include:

- Qadree Ollison (born 1996), American football player
- Ruth Allen Ollison, American journalist
- Shaun Ollison (born 1980), American model
- Tony Ollison, American football player
- Larry Ollison (born 1947), American author
