= Conor O'Clery =

Irish writer and journalist

Conor O'Clery is an Irish journalist and writer.

== Background ==
Born in Belfast, Conor O'Clery graduated from Queen's University Belfast in 1972. He was deputy editor of The Gown, the QUB student newspaper.

== Career ==
O'Clery worked for The Irish Times for over 30 years in various positions, including news editor and foreign correspondent based in London, Moscow, Washington, D.C., Beijing and New York City.

He wrote for The New Republic from Moscow, contributed columns to Newsweek International, and has been a frequent commentator on broadcast channels BBC, NPR and CNN.

O'Clery won several awards, including Journalist of the Year, twice, in Ireland: first, in 1987, for his reporting of the Soviet Union, and secondly, in 2002, for reporting the 9/11 attacks on the World Trade Center in New York, which he witnessed from his office three blocks away.

O'Clery has written a number of books.

He lives in Dublin with his Russian-born Armenian wife, Zhanna. His book, The Shoemaker and his Daughter, tells the story of Zhanna's family, an ordinary Soviet family, from World War 1 to the fall of the Soviet Union and won the 2020 Michel Déon Prize for non-fiction.

== Bibliography ==
- The Shoemaker and his Daughter, August 2018
- The Star Man, 2016
- Moscow, December 25, 1991: The Last Day of the Soviet Union, 2011
- May You Live in Interesting Times, 2008
- The Billionaire Who Wasn't: How Chuck Feeney Secretly Made and Gave Away a Fortune, 2007
- Panic at the Bank: How John Rusnak Lost AIB $700 Million (co-authored with Siobhan Creaton), 2002
- Ireland in Quotes: A History of the Twentieth Century, 1999
- The Greening of the White House, 1997
- Daring Diplomacy: Clinton's Secret Search for Peace in Ireland, 1997
- America, A Place Called Hope?, 1993
- Melting Snow: An Irishman in Moscow, 1991
- Phrases Make History Here: Century of Irish Political Quotations, 1886-1986
