= Deshon =

- Gender: Male

Origin
- Region of origin: United States

Other names
- Variant form: DeShon

Deshon is a given name and surname. Notable people with the name include:

== Given name ==
- DeShon Elliott (born 1997), American football player
- Deshon Foxx (born 1992), American sports administrator and former football player
- DeShon Singleton (born 2003), American football player
- Deshon Taylor (born 1996), American basketball player

== Surname ==
- David Deshon (1923–1992), English cricketer
- George Deshon (1823–1903), American minister
- Florence Deshon (1893–1922), American actress

== See also ==
- Deshon Ka Sartaj Bharat, an Indian military march song
- Dashon, given name
- DeSean, given name
- Deshaun, given name
- DeShawn, given name
