= Shon =

Shon may refer to:

- Shon (given name)
- Shon (Korean surname)
- Shon the Piper, a 1913 American silent short film
- a character in the ancient Indian epic Mahabharata

== See also ==
- Schön!, a fashion magazine
- Sean (disambiguation)
