= Gopchang-jeongol =

Spicy Korean stew or casserole

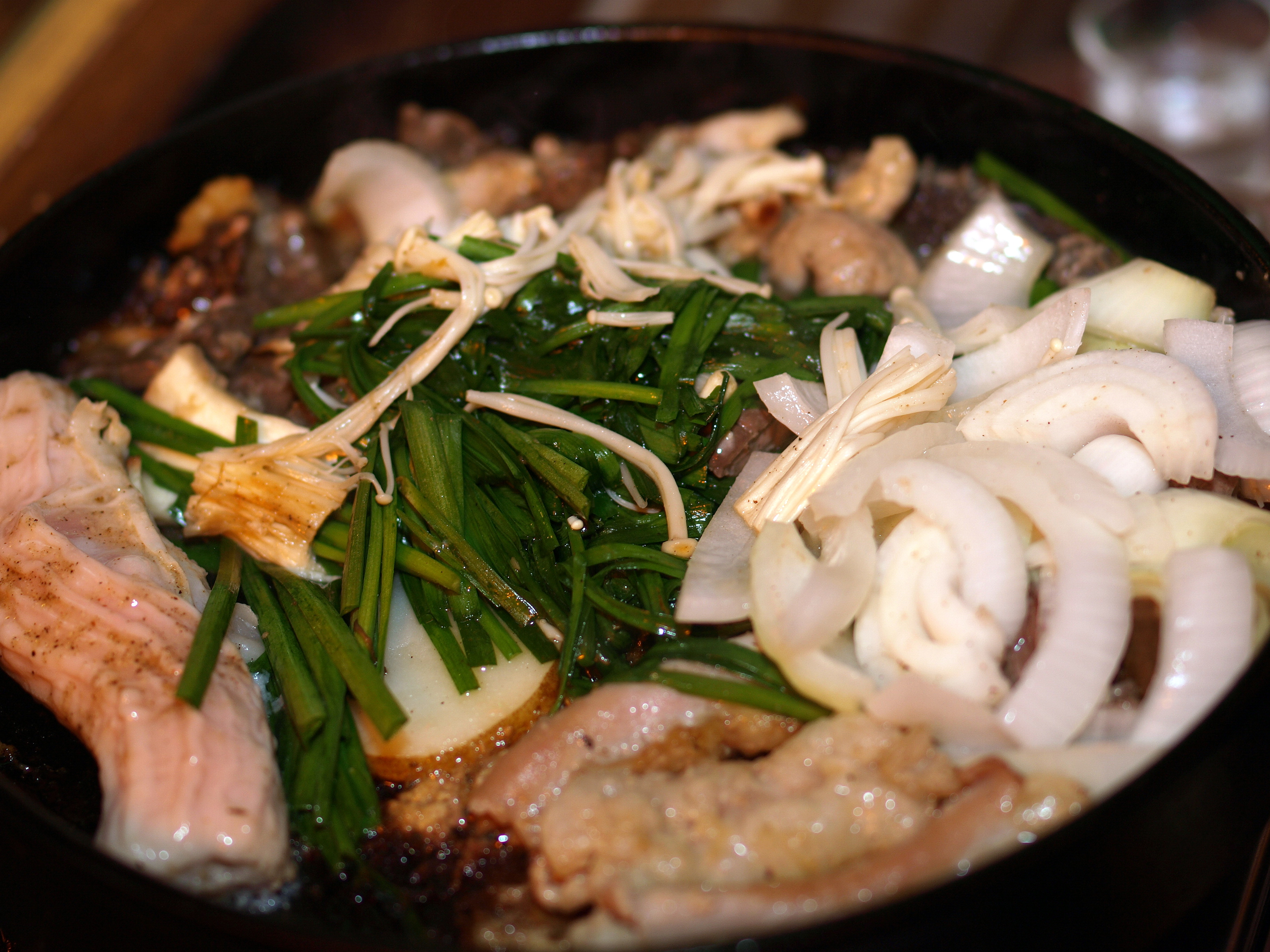
- Alternative names: Beef tripe hot pot
- Type: Jeongol
- Place of origin: Korea
- Main ingredients: Gopchang (beef small intestines)
- Ingredients generally used: Vegetables, seasonings, beef broth

Korean name
- Hangul: 곱창전골
- RR: gopchangjeongol
- MR: kopch'angjŏn'gol
- IPA: [kop̚.tɕʰaŋ.dʑʌn.ɡol]

Gopchang-jeongol (Korean: 곱창전골) or beef tripe hot pot is a spicy Korean stew or casserole made by boiling beef tripe, vegetables, and seasonings in beef broth. Gopchang refers to beef small intestines, while jeongol refers to a category of stew or casserole in Korean cuisine. Although the dish is mainly based on beef gopchang, other parts of beef innards are also used to give the dish a richer flavor and chewy texture.

To remove any odor and excessive fat in the dish, any white fat adhering to the intestines should be meticulously cleaned out by rubbing them with wheat flour and salt and washing them several times. Since cooking the dish requires not only specialized cooking techniques and a great deal of labor to prepare, but also very fresh ingredients, gopchang jeongol is generally eaten at restaurants specializing in beef innards dishes. The dish, which is seasoned with a hot and spicy red chili-based sauce, is served as a main entrée, accompanied with a bowl of steamed rice. It is often shared between several diners on the center of the table, and is also a popular anju when drinking alcoholic beverages such as soju in South Korea.

== Ingredients ==
Koreans classify beef innards into subcategories, which include yang (양), beoljibyang (벌집양), cheonyeop (처녑), makchang (막창), gopchang (곱창, also called sochang 소창), and daechang (대창).

- The first chamber of a beef stomach is called yang and is high in protein. It has been recommended for a person in weak health to drink the broth of yang since ancient times. The outer portion of the intestines is hard and lumpy, with a lot of black membranes and unclean materials attached between the projections, so those should be thoroughly cleaned out before cooking.
- Gopchang (small intestines of cattle) is commonly referred to as such because of its curvy shape rather than as sochang, which literally means "small intestines". Compared to other cuts of meat, gopchang is high in iron and vitamins. It is relatively inexpensive and has a characteristic flavor and a chewy yet palatable texture, so it is used in many Korean dishes such as gui (grilled dishes) or bokkeum (stir-fried dishes).
- Daechang means "large intestines".

== Preparation ==
The broth for the dish can be either a mixture of two broths, made from beef gopchang and brisket, respectively, or gomtang, a thin soup with a rich flavor made by simmering beef bones for a long time. If choosing the first type, the beef gopchang and brisket have to be boiled separately because beef gopchang has strong flavor that can affect the brisket broth and the meat. To make the beef gopchang broth, cleaned beef gopchang, onions, scallions, garlic, and ginger are placed in a large pot with a large amount of water and boiled until thoroughly cooked. Likewise, the brisket broth is prepared using the same method, using the same secondary ingredients to remove any bad odors that might persist. After that, both broths are chilled, and any fat floating on the surface is skimmed off. The cooked brisket is cut into bite-sized pieces, while the yang and gopchang are cut into long, diagonal strips. The boiled beef gopchang and brisket are marinated with seasonings and kneaded for a long time.

Oyster mushrooms are parboiled in salted boiling water, slightly pressed to squeeze water, torn by their grain, and seasoned. Dried shiitake mushrooms are soaked in lukewarm water, and if a small amount of sugar is added to the water, that helps the mushrooms to rehydrate more quickly. The stipes of the mushroom are taken out, and the caps are shredded and seasoned. Green chili peppers are seeded and chopped and onions and carrots are chopped into pieces the same size as the peppers. Scallions are cut into long diagonal strips.

In a pan, the remaining vegetables are placed on the bottom, and the marinated beef gopchang and brisket are placed over them in a circular fashion. The shredded mushrooms and sliced vegetables are arranged between the gopchang and meat. The prepared broths are mixed together, seasoned with salt, and poured little by little into the pan. When the dish is cooked, any floating foam is skimmed off and the gopchang jeongol is served.

== See also ==
- Tripe
- Haejangguk, soups eaten as a hangover remedy
- List of casserole dishes
- List of soups
- Korean cuisine
- List of Korean dishes
