= Siobhán Creaton =

Irish writer and journalist

Siobhán Creaton is an Irish author and former journalist. She is, as of 2025, the head of Public Affairs and Advocacy at the Royal College of Physicians of Ireland.

== Career ==
Creaton was formerly a finance correspondent with The Irish Times, and a business correspondent with the Irish Independent.

In 2013, she was appointed as an adviser to the Minister for Education and Skills, and was later a director of communications for the Department of Education and Skills. By 2018, she was a member of the Irish Street Arts, Circus and Spectacle board.

As of 2025, Creaton was the head of Public Affairs and Advocacy at the Royal College of Physicians of Ireland.

== Works ==
Creaton co-wrote Panic at the Bank: How John Rusnak Lost AIB $700 Million with Conor O'Clery. The book, about former currency trader John Rusnak, was published in 2002.

She also authored the first book about Ryanair, the low-fares airline. The book, Ryanair: How a Small Irish Airline Conquered Europe, was launched in May 2004 and later updated in 2007 to Ryanair: The full story of the controversial low-cost airline. Both were published by Aurum Press in paperback.

In 2010, she published A Mobile Fortune; the Life and Times of Denis O' Brien, an unauthorized biography of Denis O'Brien.
