= Shajn =

Shajn (Russian: Шайн) is a surname. Notable people with the surname include:

- Grigory Shajn (1892–1956), Soviet/Russian astronomer, husband of Pelageya
- Pelageya Shajn (1894–1956), Russian astronomer

== See also ==
- Shayn
- Schein
