= Intestines as food =

Offal

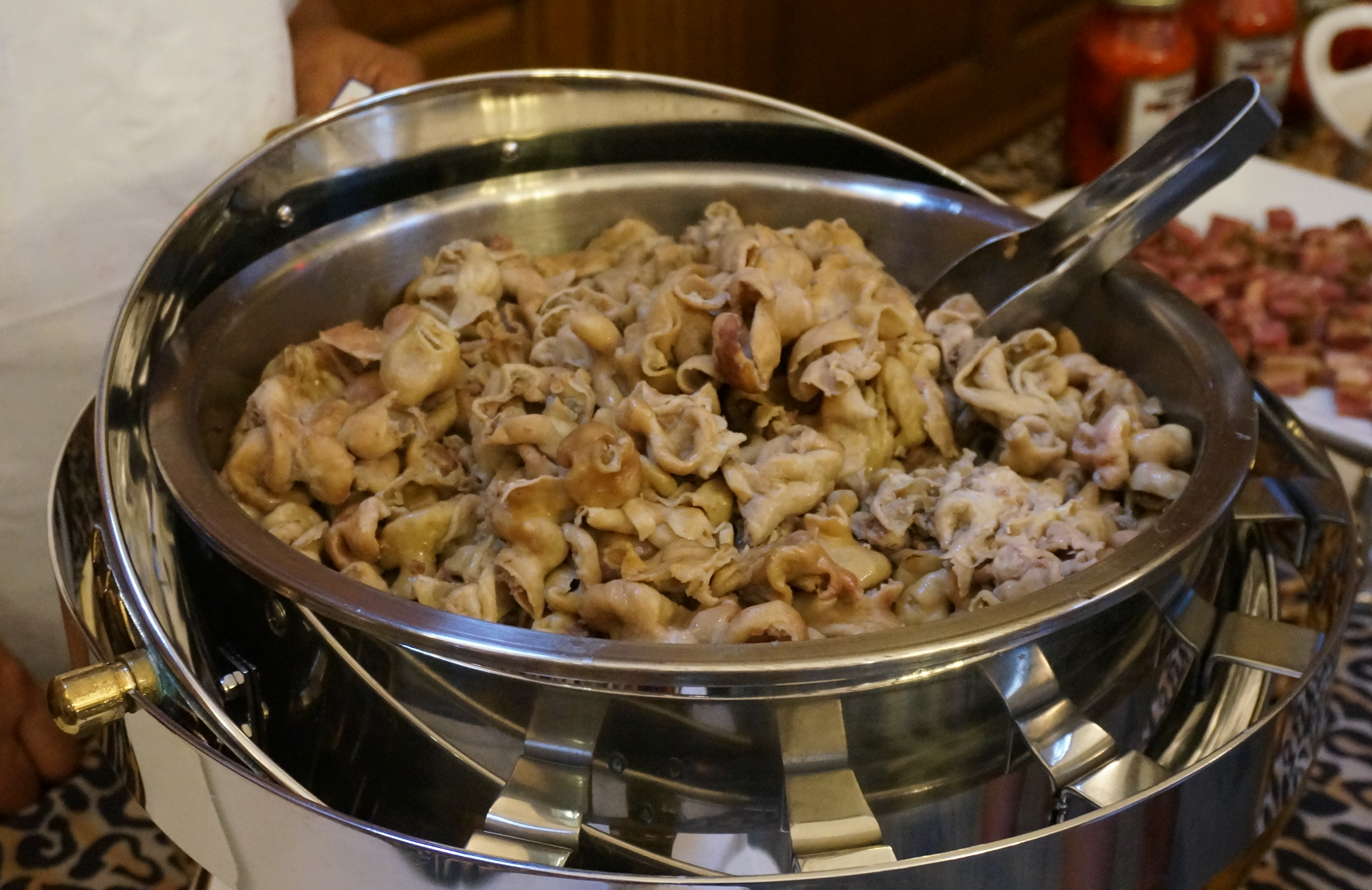
Chitlins served in a chafing dish, Duke University, Durham, North Carolina

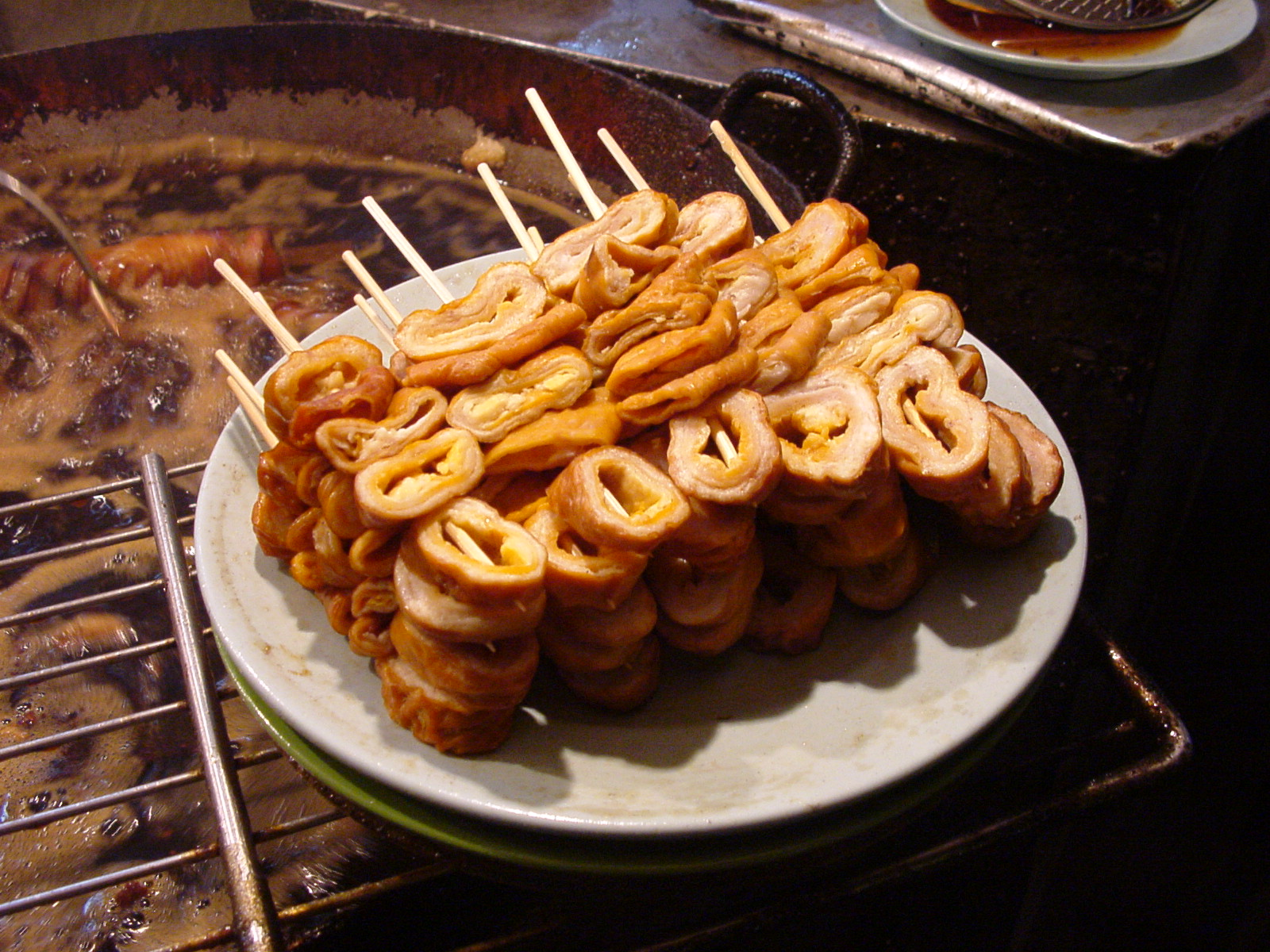
Deep-fried pork bung skewers

Animal intestines are eaten as offal in various cuisines. They are consumed both as the casing for stuffed food and as a main ingredient. Depending on preparation and cut, intestines can range in texture from very tender and gelatinous, to springy.

== Terminology ==
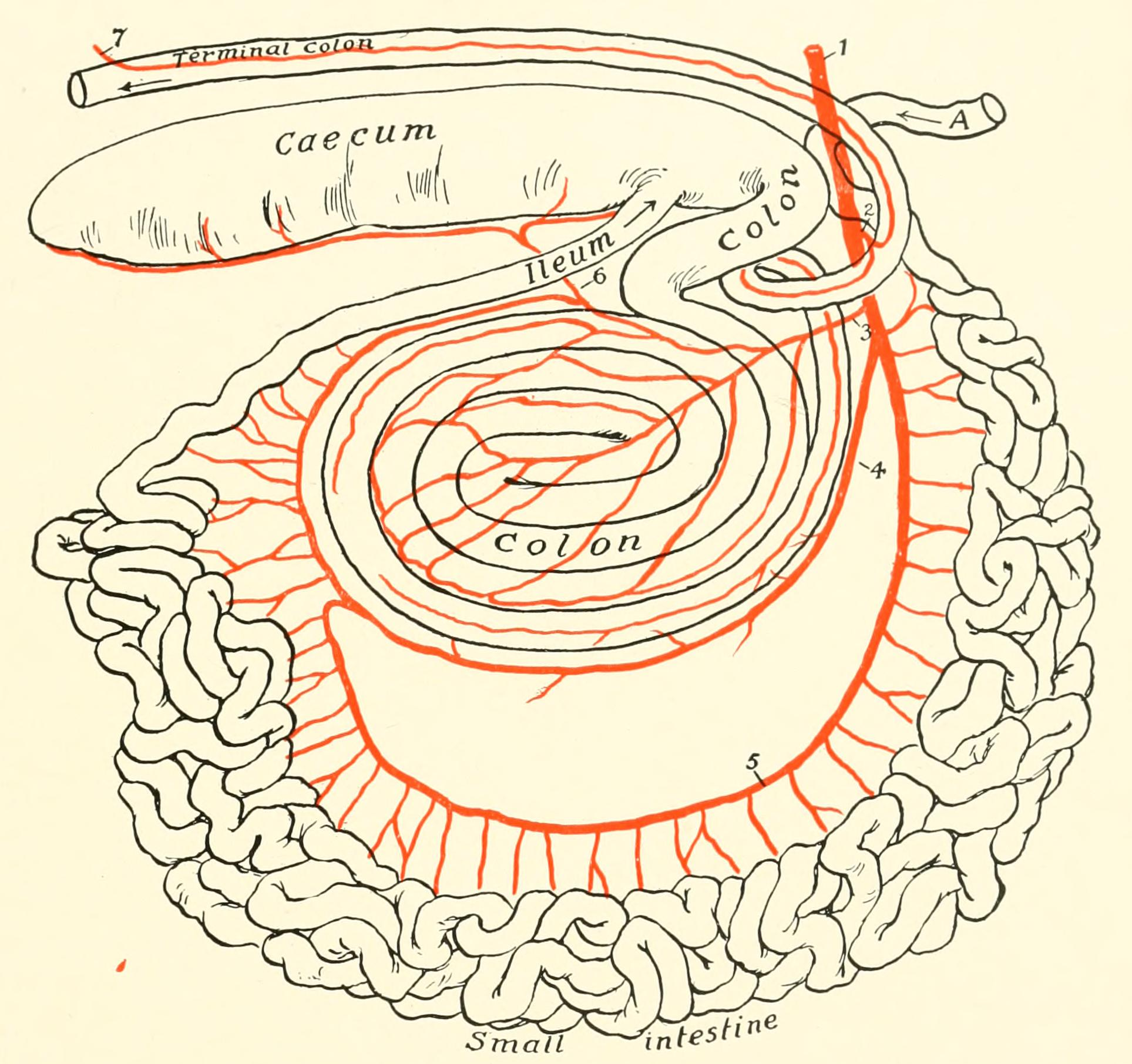
Anatomical diagram of the intestines and anterior mesenteric artery (red) of a bovine; the caecum, colon and terminal colon (rectum) are all different cuts of bovine bung.

'Chitterlings' is an archaic English-language culinary umbrella term for both the small and large intestine. The large intestine can be specifically called the 'bung'. The large intestine of common livestock is divided into the caecum, colon and rectum. In Western butchery, the caecum is split into the 'cap' side on the far end and the 'afterend' leading into the ileum and colon; the colon and rectum are called the 'middles' and 'fatend', respectively. The bung cap is typically the widest cut of bung, and the fatend the smoothest; the middles has a ribbed texture from the haustra.

=== Etymology and early usage ===
Chitterling is first documented in Middle English in the form cheterling, c. 1400. Various other spellings and dialect forms were used. The primary form and derivation are uncertain.

A 1743 English cookery book The Lady's Companion: or, An Infallible Guide to the Fair Sex contained a recipe for "Calf's Chitterlings" which was essentially a bacon and offal sausage in a calf's intestine casing. The recipe explained the use of calves', rather than the more usual pigs', intestines with the comment that "[these] sort of ... puddings must be made in summer, when hogs are seldom killed". This recipe was repeated by the English cookery writer Hannah Glasse in her 1784 cookery book Art of Cookery.

Linguist Paul Anthony Jones has written, "in the late 1500s a chitterling was an ornate type of neck ruff, so called because its frilled edge looked like the folds of a slaughtered animal's entrails".

== Preparation ==
Intestines must be stringently cleaned to avoid contamination, particularly by the orofecal pathogens Escherichia coli, Yersinia enterocolitica and Salmonella; it necessitates rigorous washing to remove any feces, which also reduces the natural odor of ammonia. The mucosa may be removed by extended boiling; industrially, the mucosa may be separated and used for producing heparin. Cooks may further sterilize the bung and reduce the ammonia stench by boiling it in an acid like vinegar before further preparation.

If discarded during butchering, bung may be rendered into products like lard, meat meal or pet food, or else incinerated.

=== Sausage ===
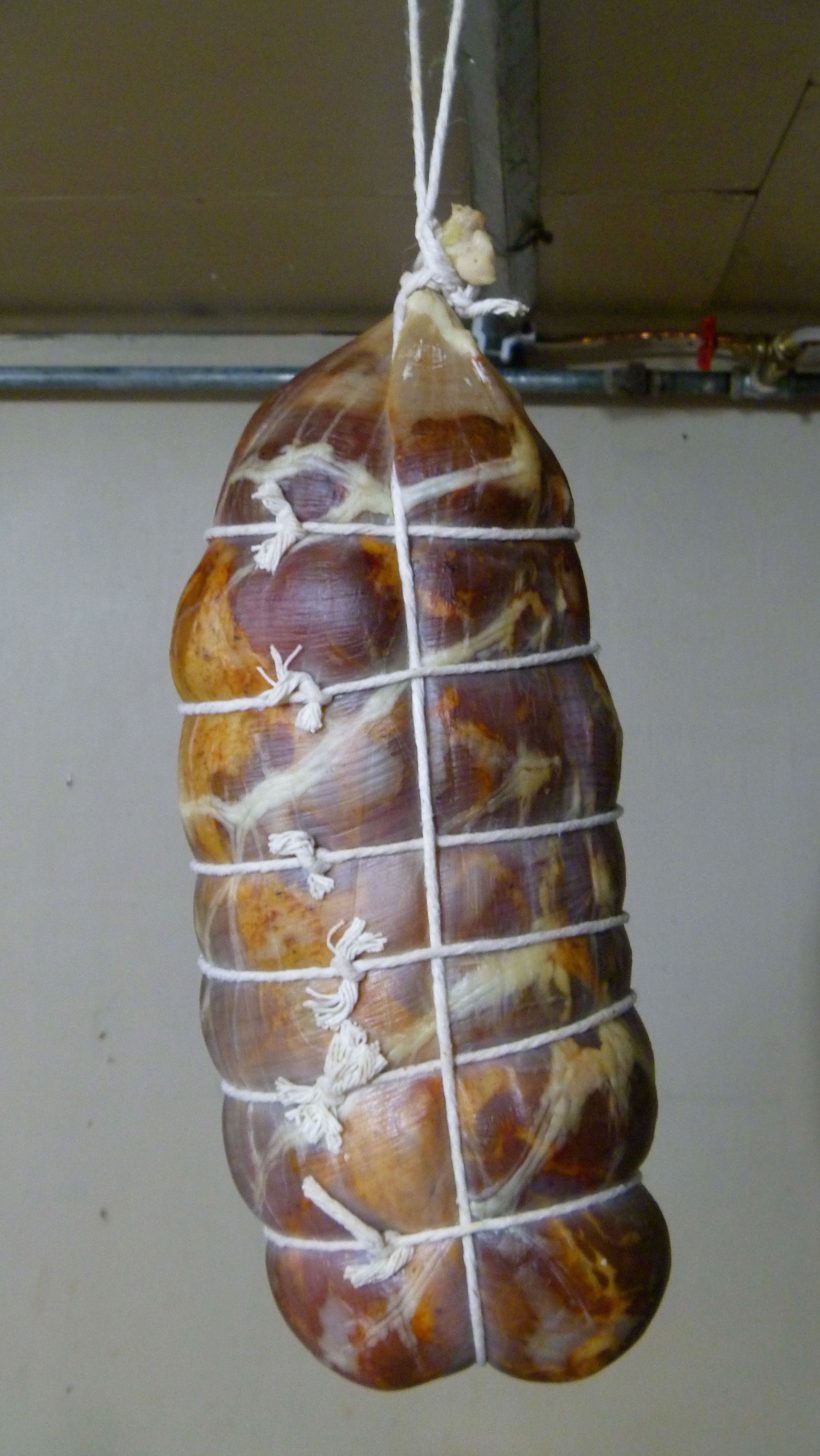
Capocollo (a.k.a. coppa, gabagool) traditionally uses beef cap bung, from the far side of the caecum; it is trussed and hung to cure.

The submucosa of intestines, peeled from between the mucosa and muscular layer, is used as sausage casing. Both the small and large intestine (bung) are used. Beef bung cap casing is used for wide format traditional sausage like capocollo (coppa; Italian American: gabagool) or stuffed derma. Pork fatend casing is used for North American braunschweiger. Middle casing is used for salamis and andouille, owing to its straightness.

== Regional traditions ==
Pigs are a common source of meat in many parts of the world, and pork intestines are eaten in many pork-eating cultures. They are popular in many parts of Europe, and are also eaten in the southern United States.

=== Europe ===
==== Balkans, Greece, and Turkey ====
Kokoretsi, kukurec, or kokoreç are usually prepared and stuffed, then grilled on a spit. In several countries such as Turkey, Greece, Albania, and Bulgaria, lamb intestines are widely used. In Turkish cuisine, the intestines are often chopped and cooked with oregano, peppers, and other spices.

==== France ====
Tricandilles are a traditional dish in Gironde. They are made of pigs' small intestines, boiled in bouillon, then grilled on a fire of grapevine cane. This is considered an expensive delicacy.

Andouillette is a type of sausage, found especially in Troyes, which is made predominantly of pig intestines.

Andouille is another kind of French intestine sausage found especially in Brittany and Normandy.

Saucisson is a type of sausage, which traditionally uses intestines both as a packaging and as an ingredient.

==== Spain ====
Gallinejas are a traditional dish in Madrid. The dish consists of sheep's small intestines, spleen, and pancreas, fried in their own fat in such a manner that they form small spirals. The dish is served hot, often with French fries. Few establishments today serve gallinejas, as this is considered to be more of a speciality than a common dish. It is most commonly served during festivals.

Zarajo: A traditional dish from Cuenca is zarajo, braided sheep's intestines rolled on a vine branch and usually broiled, but also sometimes fried, and sometimes smoked, usually served hot as an appetizer or tapa. A similar dish from La Rioja is embuchados, and from the province of Aragon, madejas, all made with sheep's intestines and served as tapas.

==== United Kingdom ====
Chitterlings were common peasant food in medieval England, and remained a staple of the diet of low-income families right up until the late nineteenth century and not uncommon into the mid-twentieth century. Thomas Hardy wrote of chitterlings in his novel Tess of the D'Urbervilles, when the father of a poor family, John Durbeyfield, talks of what he would like to eat:

Tell 'em at home that I should like for supper—well, lamb's fry if they can get it; and if they can't, black-pot; and if they can't get that, well, chitterlings will do.

It illustrates that chitterlings were the poorest choice of poor food. George Sturt, writing in 1919 details the food eaten by his farming family in Farnborough when he was a child (probably around 1830):

During the winter they had chance to weary of almost every form and kind of pig-meat: hog's puddings, gammons, chitterlings, souse, salted spareribs—they knew all the varieties and welcomed any change. Mutton they almost never tasted: but sometimes they had a calf's head; sometimes even, though less often, a joint of veal.

The alternate spelling, Chitling, is used as a charactonym by Charles Dickens for the character Tom Chitling in his novel Oliver Twist.

Chitterlings are the subject of a song by 1970s Scrumpy and Western comedy folk band, The Wurzels, who come from the southwest of England.

=== Latin America and the Caribbean ===
People in the Caribbean and in Latin America eat intestines. Chinchulín (in Argentina, Paraguay and Uruguay) or chunchule (in Chile) (from the Quechua ch'unchul, meaning 'intestine') is the cow's small intestine used as a foodstuff. Other name variations from country to country are caldo avá (Paraguay), tripas or mondongo (Dominican Republic and Puerto Rico), mondongo (Brazil, Peru, Panama and Costa Rica), chunchullo, chinchurria or chunchurria (Colombia), chinchurria (Venezuela), tripa mishqui (Ecuador), tripe (Jamaica), and tripa (Mexico).

==== Jamaica ====
In Jamaica, intestines are usually prepared in a number of ways. Usually the intestines of a goat are used as part of the ingredients of Mannish water or goat belly soup. Sometimes goat head may be included and may simply be called goat head soup, even though most of the ingredients do not constitute goat head alone. The intestines of a cow are usually prepared as a stew in one of three ways. The most popular would be curried tripe and beans where the intestines are cooked down with butter beans and curry powder. A similar stew is also made with butter beans but without the curry powder. Less common is a stew that is prepared with red kidney beans instead of butter beans and with no curry powder. In this latter case the stew has a very dark red colour and usually has a thick consistency. In most cases, intestines are commonly eaten with white rice, though rice and peas may be preferred.

==== Mexico ====
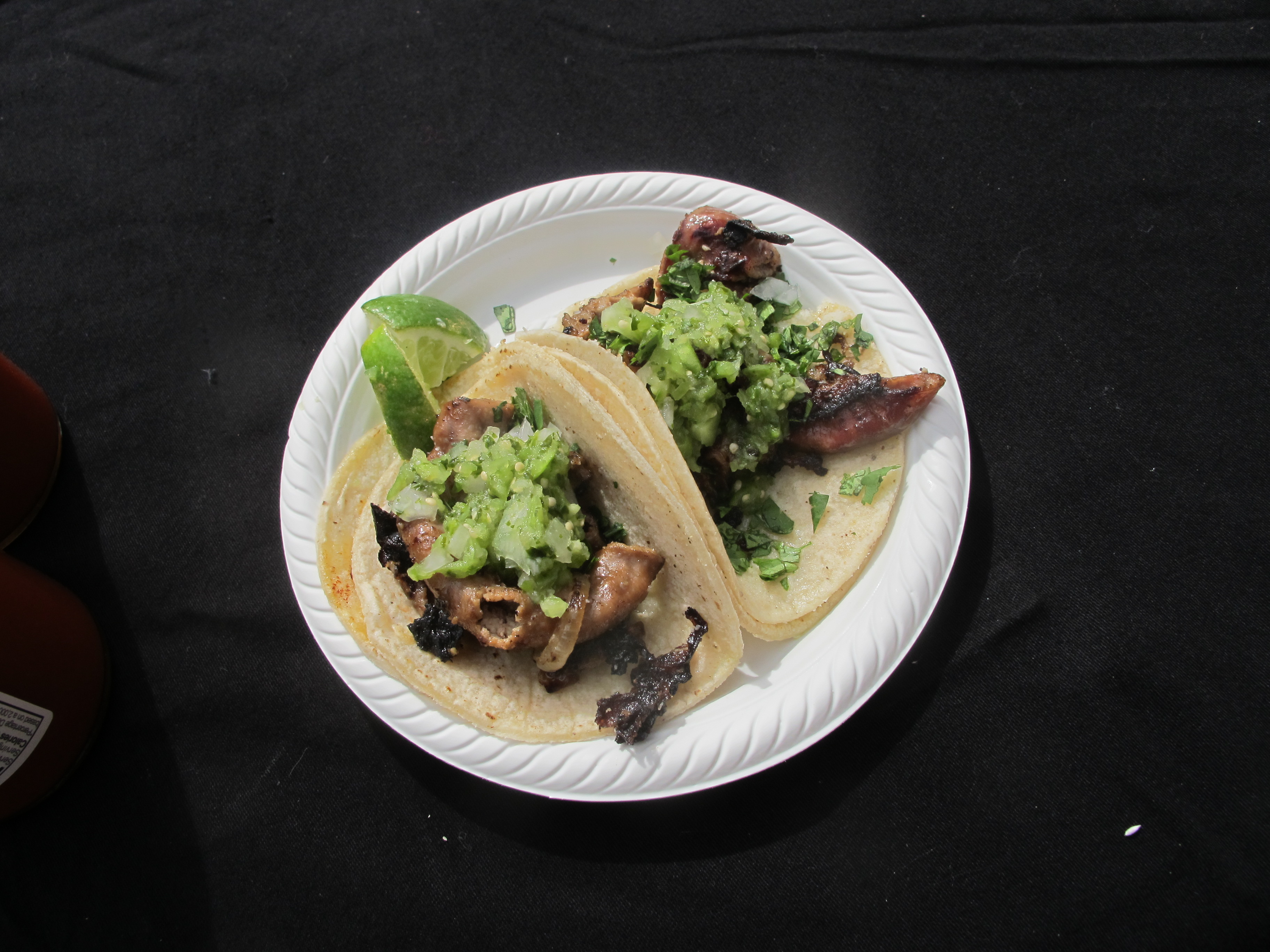
Intestine taco

In Mexico, tripas are very popular served as a guisado in tacos. They are cleaned, boiled, sliced, and then fried until crispy. They are often served with a spicy, tangy tomatillo-based salsa. In Guadalajara, along with the traditional preparation for tacos, they are often prepared as a dish, served with a specialized sauce in a bowl and accompanied by a stack of tortillas, additional complementary sauces, limes, and salt.

=== United States ===
Chitlins are traditional food of the Southern United States that spread nationwide with the Black Migration. The chitterlings are carefully cleaned and rinsed several times before they are boiled or stewed for several hours.

=== Asia and Australasia ===
Intestines are also eaten as a dish in many East Asian cuisines.

==== China ====
Both large and small intestine (typically pig) is eaten throughout China. Large intestine is called feichang, literally 'fat intestine' because it is fatty. Small intestine is called zhufenchang, literally 'pig powder intestine' because it contains a white, pasty or powdery substance called chyme. The character zhu or 'pig' is added at the beginning to disambiguate. This is because in Cantonese cuisine, there is a dish called cheong fun which uses intestine-shaped noodles.

Large intestine is typically chopped into rings and has a stronger odor than small intestine. It is added to stir-fry dishes and soups. It is also slow-cooked or boiled and served as a standalone dish. It releases oil that may be visible in the dish. Small intestine is normally chopped into tubes and may be simply boiled and served with a dipping sauce. Preparation techniques and serving presentations for both small and large intestine vary greatly within the country.

==== Japan ====
Offal dishes in Japan, known as motsu (もつ) or horumon (ホルモン), often incorporate intestines as a core ingredient. Horumonyaki is Japanese cuisine grilled meat (yakiniku) that features intestines; bung is called (teppō, lit. 'iron cannon').

==== Korea ====
In Korea, intestines (Korean: gopchang) are grilled or used for stews (Korean: jeongol). When they are grilled, they are often accompanied by various seasonings and lettuce leaves (to wrap). Stew is cooked with various vegetables and seasonings.

==== Philippines ====
In the Philippines, intestines in a culinary sense are known as isaw, while the more generic term is bituka. Pig intestines (Filipino: bituka ng baboy or isaw ng baboy) are used in dishes such as dinuguan (pig blood stew). Isaw is also often eaten grilled on skewers as street food. Chicken intestines (isaw ng manok or bituka ng manok) are also used. Pig intestines are also prepared in a similar manner to pork rinds, known locally as chicharon. Two distinct types of these are called chicharon bituka and chicharon bulaklak, differing in the part of the intestine used.

==== New Zealand ====
In New Zealand, sheep and lamb intestine is used, and sometimes pig, and is usually prepared very simply. First, moments after slaughter, a hose is run through the intestine to expel any intestinal matter; the intestine is then usually braided and boiled with cabbage and potato. The dish is called terotero in Maori culture.

== In popular culture ==
On January 11th, 2013, This American Life aired a viewer-submitted letter alleging that the American meat-packing industry was engaging in food adulteration of squid rings, swapping it for cross-sections of pork bung. This became a viral phenomenon; although This American Life did not further corroborate this letter after the initial airing, the rumor became an urban legend.

== See also ==
- Chitlin' Circuit
- Chunchullo (in Latin America)
- Flaki
- Gopchang
- Haggis
- Kishka (food)
- Pacha
- Sausage casing
- Tripe
- Sándwich de potito
