= Shawn =

Shawn may refer to:

- Shawn (given name)
- Shawn (surname)
- Shawn (album), 2024 album by Shawn Mendes

== See also ==
- Sean
- Shaun
