= DeShawn =

- Gender: Male

Origin
- Region of origin: United States

Other names
- Variant forms: DaShawn, Deshawn

DeShawn is a first name, common among the African-American community. The name adds the French prefix "de-" to the name Shawn.

DeShawn may refer to:

- Deshawn L. Parker (born 1971), American horse racing jockey
- Deshawn Purdie (born 2006), American football player
- DeShawn Shead (born 1989), American football player
- DeShawn Sims (born 1988), American basketball player
- DeShawn Snow, one of The Real Housewives of Atlanta (season 1)
- DeShawn Stevenson (born 1981), American basketball player
- DeShawn Williams (born 1992), American football player
- DeShawn Wynn (born 1983), American football player

== See also ==
- DeSean, given name
- Deshaun, given name
- Deshon, given name and surname
