= Sean Smith =

Sean Smith may refer to:

- Sean Smith (bassist) (born 1965), American modern jazz double bassist and composer
- Sean Smith (defensive tackle) (born 1965), American football player
- Sean Smith (defensive end) (born 1967), former American football player for the New England Patriots
- Sean Smith (skier) (born 1971), American Olympic skier
- Sean Smith (diplomat) (1978–2012), who died in the 2012 attack on the U.S. consulate in Benghazi
- Sean Smith (cornerback) (born 1987), American football cornerback
- Sean Smith (chemist), academic and director of NCI Australia
- Sean Smith (photojournalist), British photographer and filmmaker
- Sean Smith, Lord Harrower, Scottish judge
- Sean Smith (English singer), (born 1985), member of British pop duo Same Difference
- Sean Smith (Welsh singer), member of Welsh band The Blackout
- Sean Smith, alias for voice actor Sean Schemmel
- Sean Smith (Brookside), a character from the British television series Brookside

== See also ==
- Shaun Smith (disambiguation)
- Shawn Smith (disambiguation)
- Seán Smyth, Irish fiddler
