= The Gown =

Northern Irish newspaper

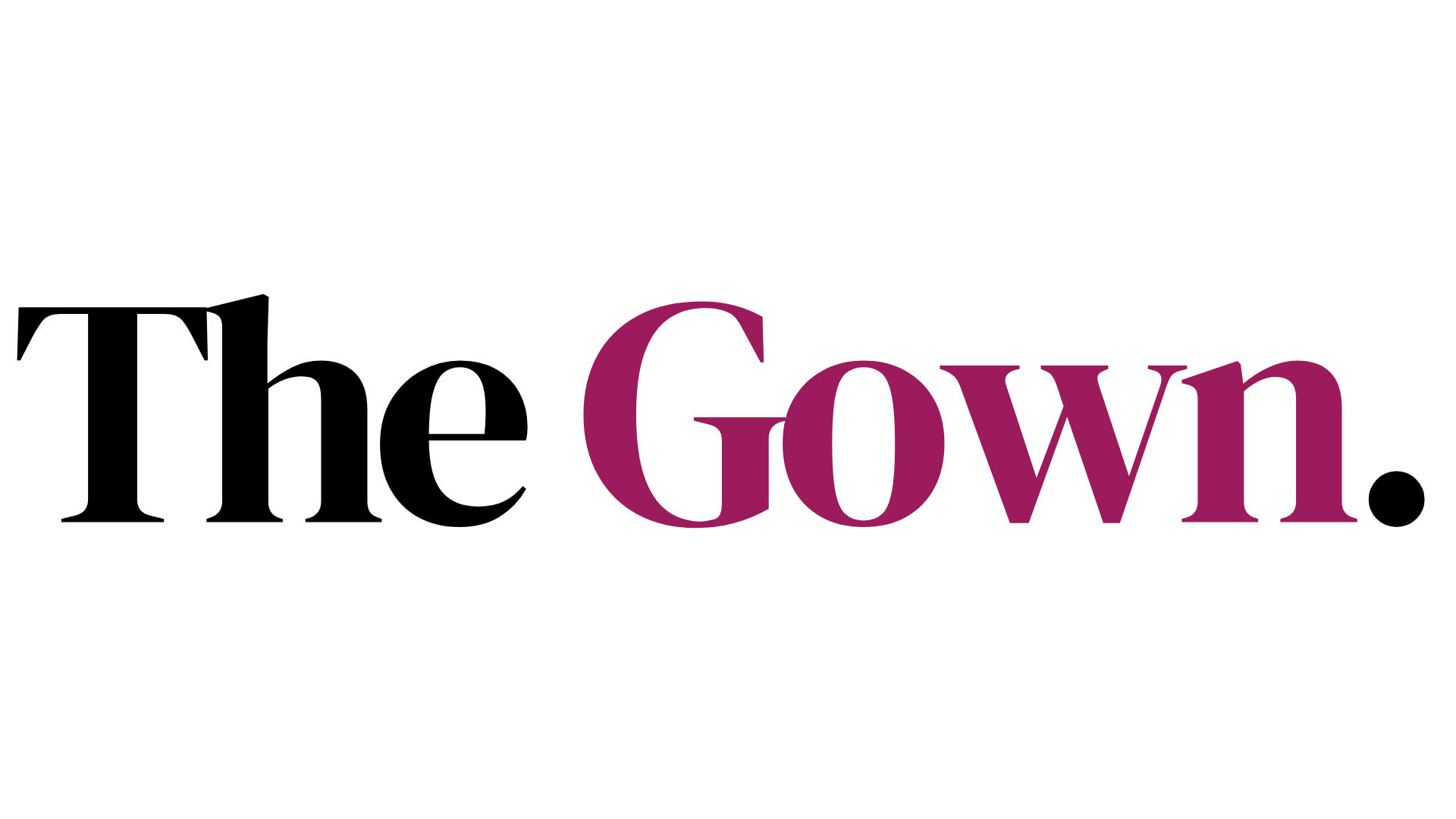
- Type: Student newspaper
- Owner: Independent
- Founder: Richard Herman
- Editor: Katie McShane
- Deputy editor: Eva Quinn
- Founded: 1955
- Language: English
- Headquarters: Queen's University Belfast Students' Union, University Road, Belfast
- Circulation: 3000
- Website: www.the-gown.com
- Free online archives: Free of charge

The Gown is the student newspaper at Queen's University, Belfast, Northern Ireland. It was formed by Richard Herman, a medical student, in April 1955. In 2005 Dr. Herman attended the paper's 50th Anniversary. From its beginning in 1955, The Gown has remained active cementing its status as the longest continuously running student newspaper in the United Kingdom.

The paper is independent from the University and is run voluntarily by students, funded solely through advertising. Originally solely in print, the paper moved online in the 2010s and has published consistently throughout the following decade.

== History ==
The Gown was founded by Dr. Richard Herman in 1955. Originally from Brooklyn, NY, Herman came to Belfast where he was affectionately known around campus as the "Yank". Here he founded 'The Gown' Newspaper where he served as it's Editor-in-Chief.

During the Troubles, the 30 years of political violence in Northern Ireland, the newspaper covered the deaths of local MP Robert Bradford and the murder of Queen's university lecturer and Assembly member Edgar Graham in 1983. The paper also interviewed Gerry Adams, leader of Sinn Féin during the height of the Provisional Irish Republican Army's campaign. The Gown also interviewed the then little-known band U2.

Past contributors include Mark Carruthers and Maggie Taggart of BBC Northern Ireland, Henry McDonald of The Observer, radio and television presenter Nick Ross, journalist Eamonn McCann, Irish Times foreign correspondent Conor O'Clery and that paper's political cartoonist Martyn Turner.

In February 2010, standing news editor Lorcan Mullen published in The Guardian an article concerning a leaked NI government report regarding university fees.

== Since 2020 ==
The paper dipped in numbers throughout the Covid-19 pandemic however continued publishing throughout. In 2025, the paper returned to print to celebrate its 70th anniversary. Since then 'The Gown' has released two free printed papers a year.
