= Deshaun =

- Gender: Male

Origin
- Region of origin: United States

Other names
- Variant form: DaShaun

Deshaun or DeShaun is a masculine given name which may refer to:

- Deshaun Davis (born 1996), American football player
- Deshaun Fenwick (born 1999), American football player
- DeShaun Foster (born 1980), American football coach and former player
- DeShaun Dupree Holton (1973–2006), American rapper, known as Proof
- Deshaun Thomas (born 1991), American basketball player
- Deshaun Watson (born 1995), American football player

== See also ==
- DeSean, given name
- Dashaun, another given name
- DeShawn, another given name
- Deshon, given name and surname
