= Shayne =

Shayne may refer to:

- Shayne (name)
- John T. Shayne & Company, American, Chicago-based woman’s clothier

== See also ==
- Shane (disambiguation)
- Shana (disambiguation)
