= Dashon =

- Gender: Male

Origin
- Region of origin: United States

Other names
- Variant form: DaShon

Dashon is a given name. Notable people with the name include:

- Dashon Goldson (born 1984), American football player
- Dashon Johnson (born 1988), American boxer
- DaShon Polk (born 1977), American football player

== See also ==
- Deshon, given name and surname
