= Shawn (given name) =

- Pronunciation: Shon
- Gender: Unisex
- Language: English

Other gender
- Feminine: Shawna

Origin
- Languages: English, Irish
- Origin: Anglicisation of Seán
- Region of origin: Ireland

Other names
- Variant forms: Shawne; Shaun; Shon; Sean
- Related names: John, Evan, Ian, Shane

Shawn is a unisex given name, an anglicized spelling of the Irish name Seán. Alternate spellings include Shawne, Shaun, Shon and Sean.

== Popularity in North America ==
The name Shawn was widely used by the 1940s for children born in the United States. Along with spelling variants Sean and Shaun, the name was among the top 1,000 names for American boys by 1950 and, with all spellings combined, was a top 10 name for American boys in 1971. The popularity of actor Sean Connery increased use of the name. The name Shaun was popularized in the late 1970s by singer Shaun Cassidy. It has since declined in use but, with all spellings combined, remained among the 300 most popular names for newborn American boys in 2022. The name is also in use for girls in the United States, with Shawn the most widely used spelling, perhaps due to its similarity to the name Dawn. Shawn was among the top 1,000 names for American girls between 1948 and 1988 and was at peak popularity as a name for girls there in 1970.

Shawn is also in use for children of both sexes in Canada. Usage of this spelling of the name has been most common in North America.

== People ==
=== Shawn ===
==== Given name ====
===== Men =====
- Shawn Abner (born 1966), American Major League Baseball player
- Shawn Achor (born 1978), American author and speaker
- Shawn Adams (born 1974), Canadian curler
- Shawn Andrews (American football) (born 1982), American professional football player
- Shawn Andrews (born 1971), American actor
- Shawn Asbury II, American football player
- Shawn Ashmore (born 1979), Canadian actor
- Shawn Austin (born 1989), Canadian singer and songwriter
- Shawn Bane Jr. (born 1995), Canadian football player
- Shawn Berry (born 1975), American murderer
- Shawn Bradley (born 1972), American National Basketball Association player
- Shawn Burnett (born 2003), Canadian sledge hockey player
- Shawn W. Campbell, United States Air Force brigadier general
- Shawn William Campbell (born 1961), American basketball player
- Shawn Christensen (fl. 2000-present), American screenwriter, film director, singer, songwriter and actor
- Shawn Christian (born 1965), American actor
- Shawn Christian (mayor) (born 1975), Pitcairnese politician
- Shawn Corey Carter (born 1969), American rapper and businessman better known as Jay-Z
- Shawn Crahan (born 1969), American musician and member of the band, Slipknot
- Shawn Crawford (born 1978), American sprinter
- Shawn Daniels (born 1979), American basketball player
- Shawn Daniels (Canadian football) (born 1966), Canadian Football League player
- Shawn Davis (American football) (born 1997), American football player
- Shawn Dawson (born 1993), Israeli basketball player
- Shawn Dean (born 1986), American professional wrestler
- Shawn Desman (born 1982), Canadian singer, songwriter, dancer, and choreographer
- Shawn Dou (born 1988), Chinese actor
- Shawn Doyle (born 1968), Canadian actor
- Shawn Elliott (actor) (1937–2016), American actor and singer
- Shawn Elliott (American football) (born 1973), American football coach and player
- Shawn Estes (born 1973), American Major League Baseball pitcher
- Shawn Everett (born 1982), Canadian music engineer
- Shawn Fain (born 1968), American labor unionist
- Shawn Fanning (born 1980), American computer programmer, entrepreneur and angel investor
- Shawn Farquhar (born 1962), Canadian magician and illusionist
- Shawn Faulkner (born 1962), American football player
- Shawn Fonteno, American actor and rapper
- Shawn Graham (born 1968), Canadian politician
- Shawn Grate (born 1976), American serial killer
- Shawn Green (born 1972), American Major League Baseball All Star player
- Shawn Hatosy (born 1975), American actor and director
- Shawn Hollenbach (born 1981), American comedian, writer and actor
- Shawn Hook (born 1984), Canadian singer, songwriter and producer
- Shawn Hopkins (born 1995), Finnish-American professional basketball player
- Shawn Huang (born 1982), Singaporean politician and former fighter pilot
- Shawn James (basketball) (born 1983), Guyanese-American basketball player
- Shawn Jones (gridiron football) (born 1970), American football player
- Shawn Jones (basketball) (born 1992), American basketball player
- Shawn Jones (musician) (born 1976), American singer and songwriter
- Shawn Jordan (born 1984), American professional mixed martial artist
- Shawn P. Krause, American animator
- Shawn Kemp (born 1969), American National Basketball Association player
- Shawn King, American National Football League player
- Shawn King (basketball), Vincentian basketball player
- Shawn Klush (born 1969), American Elvis tribute artist
- Shawn Layden (born 1961), American businessman
- Shawn Lane (1963–2003), American musician
- Shawn Lee (actor) (born 1990), actor from Singapore
- Shawn Lee (American football) (1966–2011), American National Football League player
- Shawn Lee (musician) (born 1963), American multi-instrumentalist, producer and composer
- Shawn Levy (born 1968), Canadian film director, producer and actor
- Shawn Long (born 1993), American professional basketball player
- Shawn Lonsdale (1969–2008), American videographer and critic of Scientology
- Shawn Marion (born 1978), American National Basketball Association player
- Shawn McDonald (born 1977), American singer, songwriter and guitarist
- Shawn Mendes (born 1998), Canadian singer and songwriter
- Shawn Mayotte (1965–2022), American musician, author, adult film performer, and model
- Shawn Mullins (born 1968), American singer and songwriter
- Shawn Nelson (American football) (born 1985), American National Football League player
- Shawn Nelson (criminal) (1959–1995), American plumber who stole a tank and went on a rampage
- Shawn Oakman (born 1992), American professional football player
- Shawn Olorundami, American politician
- Shawn Pelton (born 1963), American drummer and percussionist
- Shawn Phelan (1975–1998), American actor
- Shawn Phillips (born 1943), American folk rock musician
- Shawn Porter (born 1987), American boxer, former IBF welterweight champion
- Shawn Pyfrom (born 1986), American actor and singer
- Shawn Redhage (born 1981), American-Australian basketball player
- Shawn Rhoden (1975–2021), Jamaican-American bodybuilder and past Mr. Olympia
- Shawn Roberts (born 1984), Canadian actor
- Shawn Ryan (born 1966), American screenwriter and television producer
- Shawn Sheikhan (born 1969), Iranian professional poker player
- Shawn Smith (disambiguation), several people
- Shawn Spears (born 1981), Canadian professional wrestler and trainer
- Shawn Stasiak (born 1970), American Canadian chiropractor, motivational speaker and retired professional wrestler
- Shawn Stockman (born 1972), American singer, songwriter and record producer, a member of the vocal group Boyz II Men
- Shawn Sweeney, American politician
- Shawn Swords (born 1973), Canadian basketball coach, and former player
- Shawn Szep (born 1971), American racing driver
- Shawn Thia (born 1995), Singaporean actor
- Shawn Thornton (born 1973), Canadian National Hockey League player
- Shawn Tok (born 1994), Singaporean actor and singer
- Shawn Tully (born 1948), American business journalist
- Shawn Walsh (1955–2001), American ice hockey coach
- Shawn Wasabi (born 1994), Filipino-American record producer
- Shawn Wayans (born 1971), American actor, DJ, producer, writer and comedian
- Shawn Wilson, 21st century American politician and transportation official
- Shawn Wong (born 1949), Chinese American author and scholar
- Shawn Yue (born 1981), Hong Kong actor and singer
- Shawn Zarraga (born 1989), Aruban professional baseball player

===== Women =====
- Shawn Batten, American retired actress
- Shawn Cheshire (born 1975), American para-athlete and United States Army military veteran
- Shawn Christopher, American singer
- Shawn Colvin (born 1956), American singer and songwriter
- Shawn Holley (fl. 1988–present), American defense attorney
- Shawn Johnson East (born 1992), American retired gymnast
- Shawn Foltz (born 1967), American professional tennis player
- Shawn Greenberg, Canadian judge
- Shawn Kerri (born 1958), American cartoonist
- Shawn Keough (born 1959), American politician
- Shawn Ellen LaGrua (born 1962), American judge
- Shawn Morelli (born 1976), American Paralympic cyclist
- Shawn Quinn, American bridge player
- Shawn Sides, American actress
- Shawn Skelly (born 1966), American government official and LGBT activist
- Shawn Slovo (born 1950), South African screenwriter
- Shawn Thierry (born 1969), American politician
- Shawn Weatherly (born 1959), American actress and beauty queen, Miss USA and Miss Universe in 1980

==== Nickname ====
- Shawn Jefferson (born 1969), American football coach and former player

==== Ring name ====
- Shawn Daivari, American professional wrestler Dara Shawn Daivari (born 1984)
- Shawn Michaels, American professional wrestler Michael Shawn Hickenbottom (born 1965)
- Shawn Stasiak, American professional wrestler Shawn Stipich (born 1970)

==== Stage name ====
- Shawn Desman, Canadian hip hop singer, songwriter, dancer and producer Shawn Fernandes (born 1982)
- Shawn Hook, Canadian singer, songwriter and producer Shawn Hlookoff (born 1984)
- Shawn Pen, American hip hop artist, rapper, songwriter and producer Tyrone Shawn Wilkins (born 1969/70)
- Shawn Smith, a stage name of Shirley Patterson (1922–1995), Canadian-born actress

=== Shawne ===
- Shawne Duperon, American television producer
- Shawne Fielding, American-Swiss actress and model
- Shawne Jackson, Canadian singer, songwriter and actress
- Shawne Kleckner, American businessman
- Shawne Major, American mixed media artist
- Shawne Merriman, American football player
- Shawne Williams, American basketball player

== Fictional characters ==
- Shawn Brady, fictional character on the TV series, Days of Our Lives
- Shawn Butler, fictional character from the soap opera, General Hospital
- Shawn Hunter, on the TV series Boy Meets World and Girl Meets World
- Shawn Spencer, main protagonist of the TV series Psych

== See also ==
- Shawn (surname)
- Shaun, includes a list of people with given name Shaun
- Shon (given name), includes a list of people named Shon
- List of people with given name Sean
- Rashawn, a given name
- Shawna, a feminine given name. It is a variant of Shauna, derived from Shawn.
