= Deshun =

Deshun can be a given name or a middle name. Notable people with the name include:

== Given name ==
- Deshun Deysel (born 1970), South African mountaineer and businesswoman who participated in the South African Everest Expedition, 1996
- Deshun Jackson, American streetball player
- Wang Deshun, Chinese model and film actor
- Xiu Deshun (Chinese: 修德顺; born 1989), Chinese chess grandmaster
- Zhang Deshun (Chinese: 张德顺; born 1996), Chinese long-distance runner

== Middle name ==
- Christopher Deshun Jones (born 1994), American football defensive tackle
- Jerick Deshun McKinnon (born 1992), American football running back

== See also ==
- DeSean
