= DeSean =

- Gender: Male

Origin
- Region of origin: United States

Other names
- Variant form: Desean

DeSean or Desean is a given name. People with the name include:

- DeSean Bishop (born 2004), American football player
- DeSean Hadley (born 1977), American basketball player
- DeSean Jackson (born 1986), American football player
- Desean Terry, American actor
- Kentrell DeSean Gaulden, better known as YoungBoy Never Broke Again, American rapper
- Andre DeSean Wicker, better known as Dresta, American rapper

== See also ==
- "Te Desean", a song by Mexican singer Luis Miguel
- Deshaun, given name
- DeShawn, given name
- Deshun, given name
- Deshon, given name and surname
