= Shaun Smith =

Shaun Smith may refer to:

- Shaun Smith (Australian footballer) (born 1969), Australian rules footballer
- Shaun Smith (defensive lineman) (born 1981), American football player
- Shaun Smith (linebacker) (born 1982), American football player
- Shaun Smith (English footballer) (born 1971), English footballer
- Shaun Smith (make-up effects artist), American special effects artist

== See also ==
- Shawn Smith (disambiguation)
- Sean Smith (disambiguation)
