= Shaun Evans (disambiguation) =

Shaun Evans may refer to:

- Shaun Evans (born 1980), English actor, best known for Endeavour (2012–2023)
- Shaun Evans (referee) (born 1987), Australian soccer referee
- Shaun Evans (rugby union) (born 1996), Welsh rugby union player
- Shaun Evans (One Life to Live), a fictional character on the ABC soap opera One Life to Live

== See also ==
- Shawn Evans (disambiguation)
- Sean Evans (disambiguation)
- Evans (surname)
