= Shona (given name) =

Shona is a female name of Gaelic and Hebrew origin. (Scottish and Irish) also. Coincidentally is the name of an ethnic group in Southern Africa, Zimbabwe. The name Shona also has a meaning “God is gracious” as well as female name for John.

== Given name ==
- Shona (singer), French singer
- Shona Auerbach, British film director
- Shona Banda (born 1978/9), American medical cannabis rights activist
- Shona Barbour (born 1979), Canadian curler
- Shona Bell (1924–2011), New Zealand palaeontologist
- Shona Brown (born c. 1966), American businesswoman
- Shona Brownlee (born 1979), British skier and RAF aircraftwoman
- Shona Rapira Davies (born 1951), sculptor and painter of Ngati Wai ki Aotea tribal descent
- Shona Fraser (born 1975), British music journalist
- Shona Holmes, Canadian woman who controversially underwent treatment for a Rathke's cleft cyst in the U.S. and claimed that it threatened her life
- Shona Kinloch (born 1962), Scottish artist
- Shona Laing (born 1955), New Zealand musician
- Shona Le Mottee, Canadian Celtic/pop fiddler and vocalist
- Shona Macdonald (born 1969), Scottish artist and academic
- Shona Dunlop MacTavish (1920–2019), New Zealand dancer and dance teacher
- Shona Marshall (born 1964), Scottish sport shooter
- Shona McCallin (born 1992), English international field hockey player
- Shona McGarty (born 1991), British actress
- Shona McIntyre (born 1980), Scottish former international cricketer
- Shona McIsaac (born 1960), British politician
- Shona Mooney (born c. 1984), Scottish fiddle player and composer
- Shona Morgan (born 1990), Australian former gymnast
- Shona Moss (born 1969), Canadian sailor
- Shona Powell-Hughes (born 1991), Welsh Rugby Union player
- Shona Robison (born 1966), Scottish politician
- Shona Rubens (born 1986), Canadian alpine skier
- Shona Schleppe (born 1963), Canadian former field hockey player
- Shona Seawright (born 1977), Irish cricketer
- Shona Thorburn (born 1982), British-born basketball player in the WNBA
- Shona Tucker, American actress

== Fictional characters ==
- Shona Ramsey, a character in the TV soap-opera Coronation Street
