= Shawn Smith =

Shawn Smith may refer to:

- Shawn Smith (musician) (1965–2019), American singer, songwriter, and musician
- Shawn Smith (American football), National Football League referee
- Shawn Smith (Colorado), associated with election denial in Colorado and Tina Peters (politician)
- Shirley Patterson (1922–1995), Canadian-born actress sometimes billed as Shawn Smith
- Shawn Laval Smith, American man perpetrator of the murder of Brianna Kupfer

== See also ==
- Shaun Smith (disambiguation)
- Sean Smith (disambiguation)
