= Shawne Major =

American mixed media artist

Shawne Major (born December 25, 1968, New Iberia, Louisiana) is an American mixed media artist, working in two-dimensional mixed-media hangings and three-dimensional mixed media sculptures.

== Education ==
Major was born in New Iberia, Louisiana, on December 25, 1968. She attended the University of Southwestern Louisiana, where she received a Bachelor of Fine Arts degree in painting in 1991. She then went on to study at Rutgers University, where she received a Master of Fine Arts degree in sculpture in 1995.

Before attending university, Major had little exposure to the arts, saying "as a kid I didn’t know you could be an artist. I didn’t know that was something like that was an option." She was strongly influenced by Robert Rauschenberg, saying "because of him I can make anything I want." She was also influenced by the paintings of Wassily Kandinsky and artists such as Lynda Benglis, Nancy Graves, Richard Pousette-Dart, and Kurt Schwitters.

== Art ==
Major's works are assemblages, classified as bricolage. Her two-dimensional works are sometimes referred to as tapestries, though this is technically incorrect, since a tapestry is woven from thread, whereas Major works by sewing found objects onto a base of fabric or poultry netting.

To that base, Major sews objects such as toys, clothing, buttons, ribbons, fake fur, jewelry, charms, money household objects such as faucets and fixtures, wire, electronic circuit-boards, and husbandry equipment.

Major refers to her two-dimensional works as "physical paintings."

== Awards ==
Major has been awarded a Rauschenberg residency and a Pollack-Krasner Grant.
