= Sian James =

Sian James may refer to:

- Siân James (novelist) (born 1930), Welsh author
- Siân James (politician) (born 1959), Welsh Labour Member of Parliament
- Siân James (musician) (born 1961), Welsh traditional folk singer and harpist

== See also ==
- Sean James (born 1969), American football player
- James (surname)
