= Shawn (surname) =

Shawn is a surname. Notable people with the surname include:

- Allen Shawn (born 1948), American composer, pianist, educator and author
- Dick Shawn (1923-1987), American actor and comedian
- Ted Shawn (1891-1972), American dancer and choreographer
- Wallace Shawn (born 1943), American actor and playwright
- William Shawn (1907-1992), American magazine editor who edited The New Yorker from 1952 until 1987
- Frank S. Shawn, a pen name of author Ron Goulart (born 1933)

== See also ==
- Shawn (given name)
