= David Deshon =

English cricketer

Personal information
- Full name: David Peter Tower Deshon
- Born: 19 June 1923; Marylebone, London
- Died: 18 January 1992 (aged 68); Heathrow Airport, London
- Batting: Right-handed
- Role: Batsman

Domestic team information
- Years: Team
- 1947–1953: Somerset
- FC debut: 9 July 1947 Somerset v Nottinghamshire
- Last FC: 6 June 1953 Somerset v Lancashire

Career statistics
Competition	First-class
Matches	4
Runs scored	82
Batting average	11.71
100s/50s	0/0
Top score	21
Catches/stumpings	1/–
- Source: CricketArchive, 23 May 2010

David Peter Tower Deshon (19 June 1923 – 18 January 1992) was a successful school cricketer whose later progress in first-class cricket was limited by his career as a full-time officer in the Royal Artillery. He was born at Marylebone, London and died suddenly of a heart attack at Heathrow Airport.

== Cricket career ==
Deshon was a successful schoolboy cricketer at Sherborne School and was selected for the annual Marylebone Cricket Club (MCC) schools cricket festival in 1941, where he scored a century and outshone Trevor Bailey in a big partnership. He was a middle-order right-handed batsman.

As an officer in the regular army, his first-class cricket was very restricted. He made four appearances for Somerset, three of them in 1947 and a final one in 1953. His final match was Bertie Buse's infamous benefit match at Bath against Lancashire in 1953, when the entire match was completed in a single day; Deshon's contributions to the debacle were innings of 0 and 9. In all, he scored 82 first-class runs at an average of 11.71, with a highest score of 21. He appeared in non-first-class inter-services cricket, as well as playing for the Royal Artillery.

== Military career ==
On leaving school, Deshon was commissioned as a second lieutenant in the Royal Artillery on 24 October 1942. After the Second World War ended, he remained within the Army and was promoted to Lieutenant (1946), Captain (1950) and Major (1957). He retired from the Royal Artillery with the rank of major in 1958.
