= Shaun Wade (disambiguation) =

Shaun Wade (born 1998) is an American football player.

Shaun or Sean Wade may also refer to:

- Sean Wade (born 1966), New Zealand long-distance runner
- Shaun Wade (footballer) (born 1969), English footballer
