= Shane English School =

Japanese chain of English conversation schools

Coordinates: 35.64904°N 139.91477°E

- Native name: シェーン英会話
- Romanized name: Shēn Eikaiwa
- Industry: English schools
- Founded: 1977; 48 years ago in Chiba Prefecture, Japan
- Headquarters: Tokyo, Japan
- Area served: Japan
- Services: English conversation instruction
- Owner: ZE Holdings Company
- Number of employees: 1,106 (2016)
- Website: www.shane.co.jp

Shane English School (シェーン英会話, Shēn Eikaiwa) is a chain of English conversation schools in Japan and other countries. It was founded by Shane Lipscombe in Chiba Prefecture in 1977. Formerly part of the Saxoncourt Group, it is now owned by the cram school operator Eikoh. As of March 2017, it has 206 branches located all over Japan, and is also present in Taiwan, mainland China, and Vietnam. As of November 2013, it had about 20,000 students throughout Japan.

== History ==
In 2001, after an education ministry panel recommended English education at elementary schools, the company offered courses for Japanese elementary school teachers to prepare them for teaching English to their students.

In 2010, the company was purchased by the cram school operator Eikoh because they wanted to move into the teaching of 5th- and 6th-grade students due to the new compulsory English teaching at that age level. At that time, it operated 199 schools in the Kantō region — of which 46 were franchised—and had four subsidiaries: Shane Corporation Japan, Shane Corporation Kita Kanto, Shane Corporation Higashi Kanto, and Shane Corporation Minami Kanto.

== Controversies ==
In March 2017, two teachers filed a suit against the company, claiming wrongful dismissal.
