= Sinéad =

Sinéad (/ʃɪˈneɪd/ shin-AYD, Irish: [ˈʃɪnʲeːd̪ˠ, ʃɪˈnʲeːd̪ˠ]) is an Irish feminine name. It is derived from the French Jeanette, which is cognate to the English Janet, itself a feminine form of the Hebrew Yohanan, "God forgave/God gratified". In English, Sinéad is also commonly spelled Sinead. The name is generally translated into English as either Jane or Jennifer, or as the Scottish female name Jean.

Notable people and characters with the name include:

== People ==
=== Sports ===
- Sinéad Cahalan, camogie player
- Sinead Farrelly (born 1989), footballer
- Sinead Greenan (born 1992), cyclist
- Sinead Jennings (born 1976), rower
- Sinead Kerr (born 1978), ice dancer
- Sinéad Millea, former camogie player
- Sinead Miller (born 1990), cyclist
- Sinéad Russell (born 1993), Olympic swimmer

=== Music ===
- Sinéad Harnett (born 1990), singer/songwriter
- Sinéad Lohan (born 1971), singer/songwriter
- Sinéad Madden, singer/songwriter
- Sinéad Mulvey (born 1988), singer, air hostess
- Sinéad O'Carroll (born 1973), singer with Irish pop band B*Witched
- Sinéad O'Connor (1966–2023), singer/songwriter
- Sinéad Quinn (born 1980), recording artist, reality show contestant

=== Film and television ===
- Sinéad Cusack (born 1948), actress
- Sinead Desmond (born 1974), TV presenter
- Sinead Keenan (born 1977), actress
- Sinead Matthews, actress
- Sinéad Moynihan (born 1982), model and actress
- Sinéad Noonan (born 1987), model and actress

=== Other ===
- Sinead Bovell, Canadian futurist
- Sinéad Burke (born 1990), writer, academic, influencer
- Sinéad de Valera (1878–1975), children's book author and wife of Ireland’s first taoiseach
- Sinéad Donnelly, Irish professor of palliative medicine
- Sinead Farrington, British particle physicist
- Sinéad Gleeson, author and book editor
- Sinéad Griffin (born 1986), Irish physicist
- Sinéad Morrissey (born 1972), poet
- Sinéad Sheppard, dancer

== Fictional characters ==
- Sinead O'Connor, in the TV series Hollyoaks, played by Stephanie Davis
- Sinead Tinker, in the TV series Coronation Street, played by Katie McGlynn
- Sinead Starling, in the series The 39 Clues
- Sinead, a character on the Scottish sitcom Still Game

== See also ==
- List of Irish-language given names
- Siobhán, feminine Irish-language name ultimately derived from the same Hebrew name
