= Sean Evans =

Sean Evans may refer to:

- Sean Evans (interviewer), host of the YouTube series Hot Ones
- Sean Evans (basketball), American basketball player
- Sean Boog, American rapper born Sean Wayne Evans
- Seán Evans, retired Irish sportsperson
- Sean Evans (wrestler), American professional wrestler

== See also ==
- Shaun Evans (disambiguation)
