= Gopchang =

Korean intestine dish

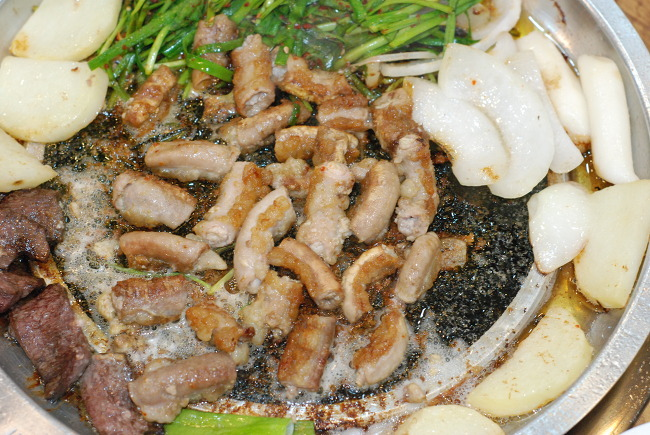
- Gopchang-gui (grilled beef small intestines)
- Alternative names: Gopchang-gui
- Type: Gui
- Place of origin: Korea
- Associated cuisine: Korean cuisine
- Main ingredients: Beef small intestine or pork big intestines
- Food energy (per 100 g serving): 145 kcal (610 kJ)
- Similar dishes: Chunchullo

Korean name
- Hangul: 곱창
- RR: gopchang
- MR: kopch'ang
- IPA: [kop̚.tɕʰaŋ]

Gopchang (Korean: 곱창) is a dish in Korean cuisine. It can refer to either the small intestines of cattle, the large intestines of pigs, or a gui (grilled dish) made of the small intestines. The latter is also called gopchang-gui (곱창구이; "grilled intestines"). The tube-shaped offal is chewy with rich elastic fibers.

It can be stewed in a hot pot (gopchang-jeongol, 곱창전골), grilled over a barbecue (gopchang-gui), boiled in soup with other intestines (naejang-tang), or made into a sausage (sundae).

In the past, gopchang was a popular, nutritious, and cheap dish for the general public. Rich in iron and vitamins, it was served as a health supplement for improving a weak constitution, recovering patients, and postpartum depression. Today, gopchang is also regarded as a delicacy and is more expensive than regular meat of the same weight. It is a popular anju (food served and eaten with soju).

== Preparation ==
The intestines are cleaned thoroughly, rubbed with wheat flour and coarse salt, and rinsed several times. The fat is trimmed off, and the cleaned gopchang is soaked in water to remove any traces of blood. Garlic, ginger, onion, cooking wine, black pepper, and Korean pepper are common marinating ingredients, mainly used for eliminating any unpleasant odors and tenderizing the meat of gopchang.

Ingredients for gopchang-gui marinade are juiced, rather than minced, so that they don't burn during the grilling process. Common ingredients include soy sauce, gochutgaru (chili powder), mullyeot (rice syrup), cheongju (rice wine), onion juice, apple juice, garlic juice, scallion juice, and ginger juice.

The gopchang is first marinated in the seasonings and spices, then grilled on a lightly greased pan or griddle. Onions and bell peppers are often grilled together with gopchang. Grilled gopchang is often served dipped in salt and sesame oil. After that, usually Bokkeumbap (볶음밥; "fried rice") is cooked with Gopchang oil.

== Varieties and similar dishes ==
Gopchang of pork big intestines is usually called dwaeji-gopchang (돼지곱창; "pig gopchang").

In Korean cuisine, food similar to gopchang prepared with beef blanket tripe is called yang-gopchang (양곱창; "rumen gopchang"), while the one prepared with beef reed tripe is called makchang (막창; "last tripe"), and the one with beef large intestines is called daechang (대창; "big innards").

Internationally, gopchang could be compared to chitterlings (pork's small intestines) or Latin American chunchullo (beef, pork, or lamb's small intestines). The Spanish/Portuguese term tripas or the English tripe also occasionally referred to as small beef's intestines, attesting to the practice of consuming animal intestines as a truly worldwide phenomenon.

Some foods have tripe in their dishes, such as stir-fried tripe and gopchang jeongol.

Nakgopsae (낙곱새) is a spicy soup with octopus, tripe, and shrimp, and is also loved as a side dish that is sometimes good to eat with alcohol. It is said that this food was first developed in Busan, South Korea.

== Gallery ==
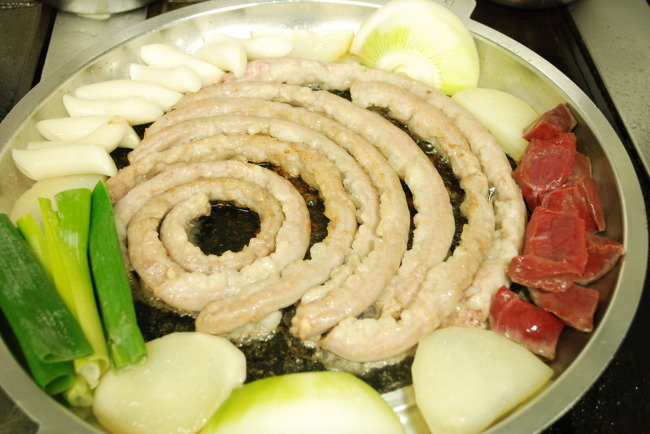
Uncooked gopchang prepared to cook on grill

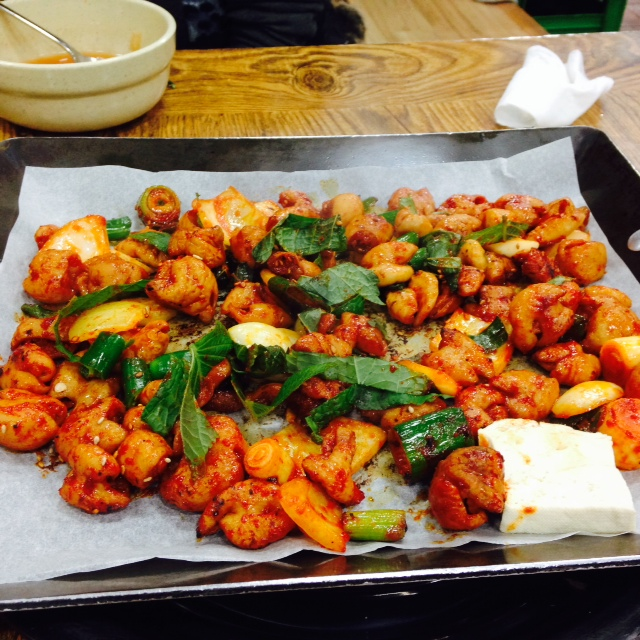
Yangnyeom-gopchang (marinated gopchang)

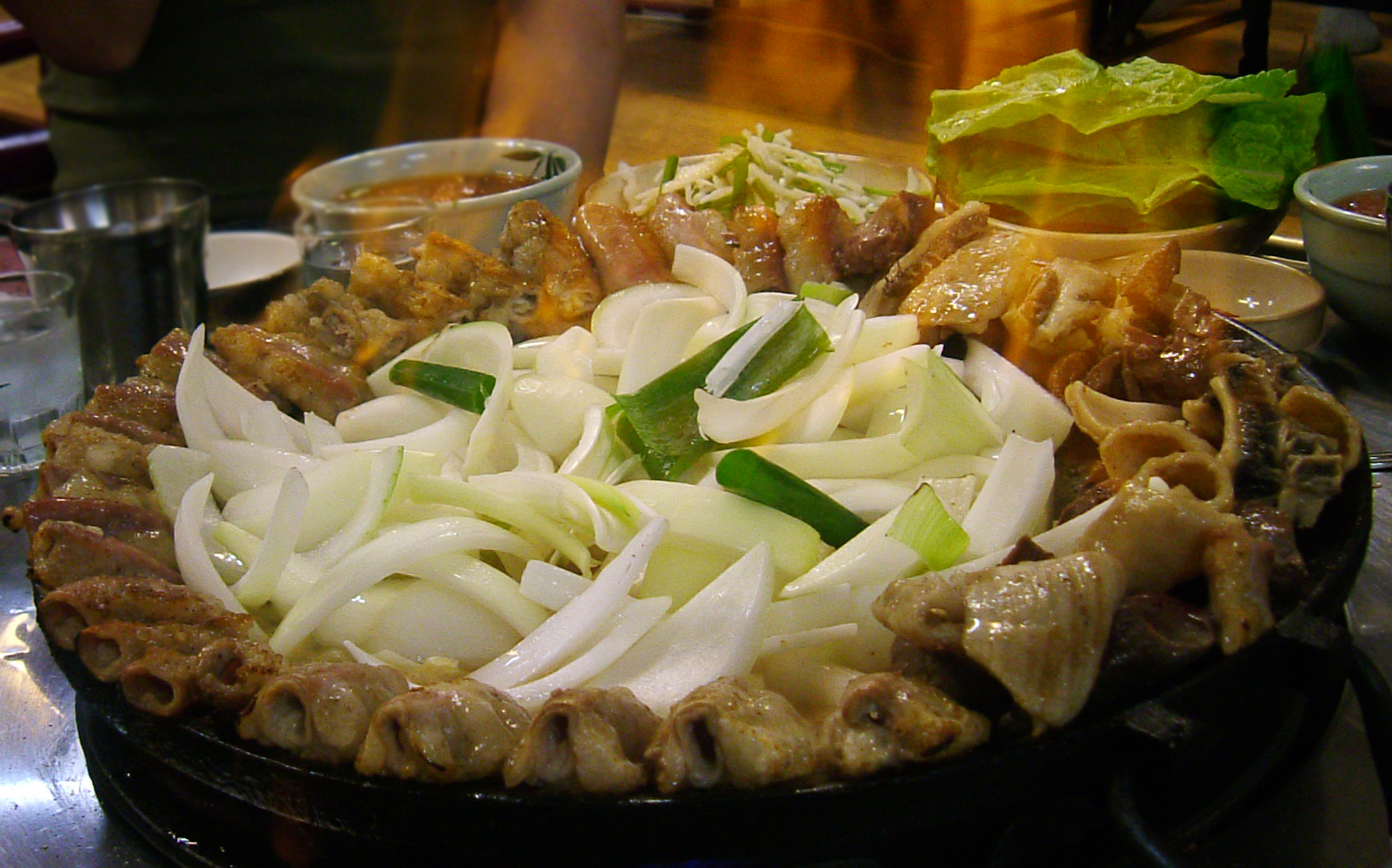
Gopchang-bokkeum (stir-fried gopchang)

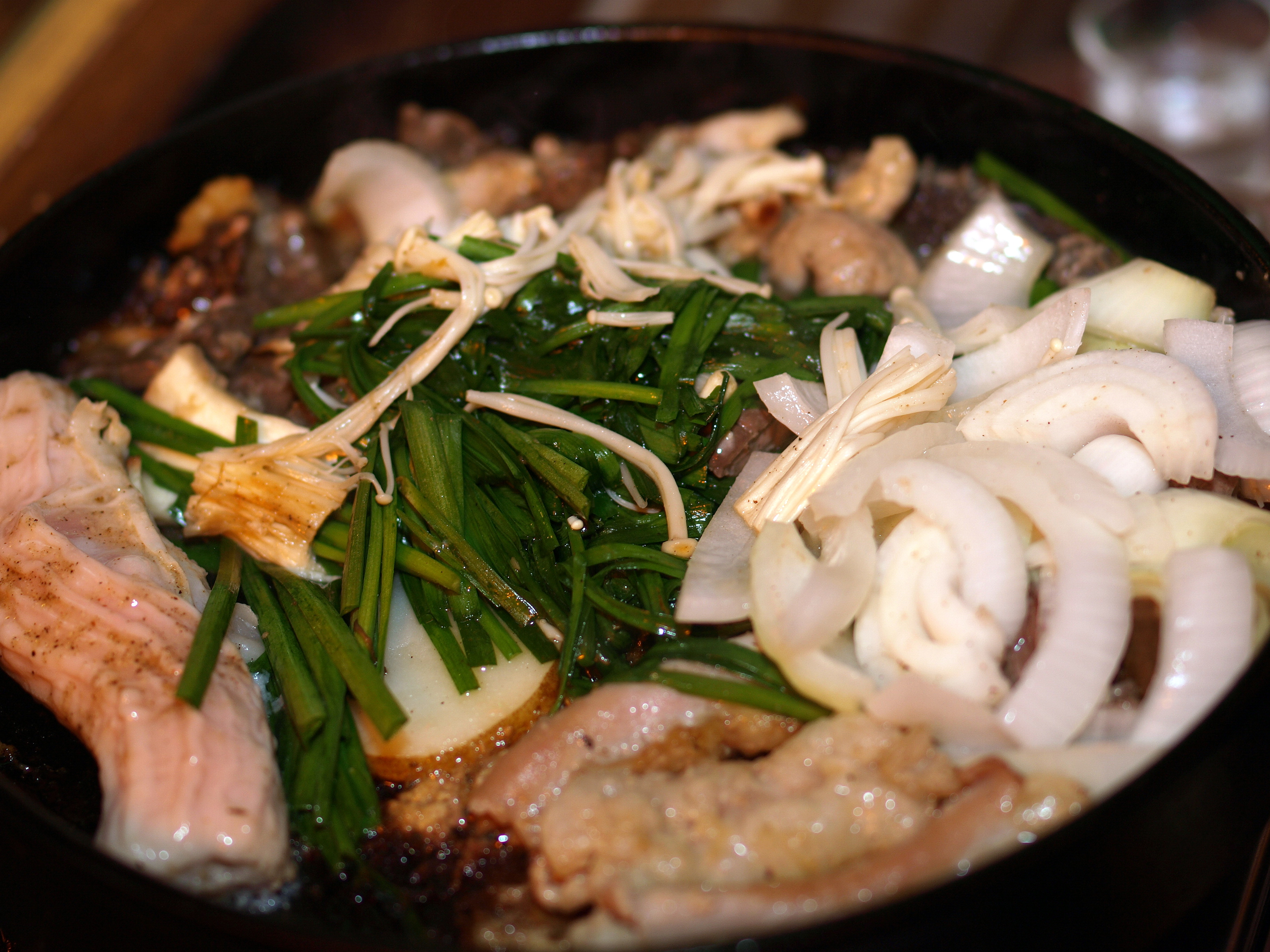
Gopchang-jeongol (gopchang hot pot)
