= Chunchullo =

Latin American dish made from beef intestine

Chunchulines
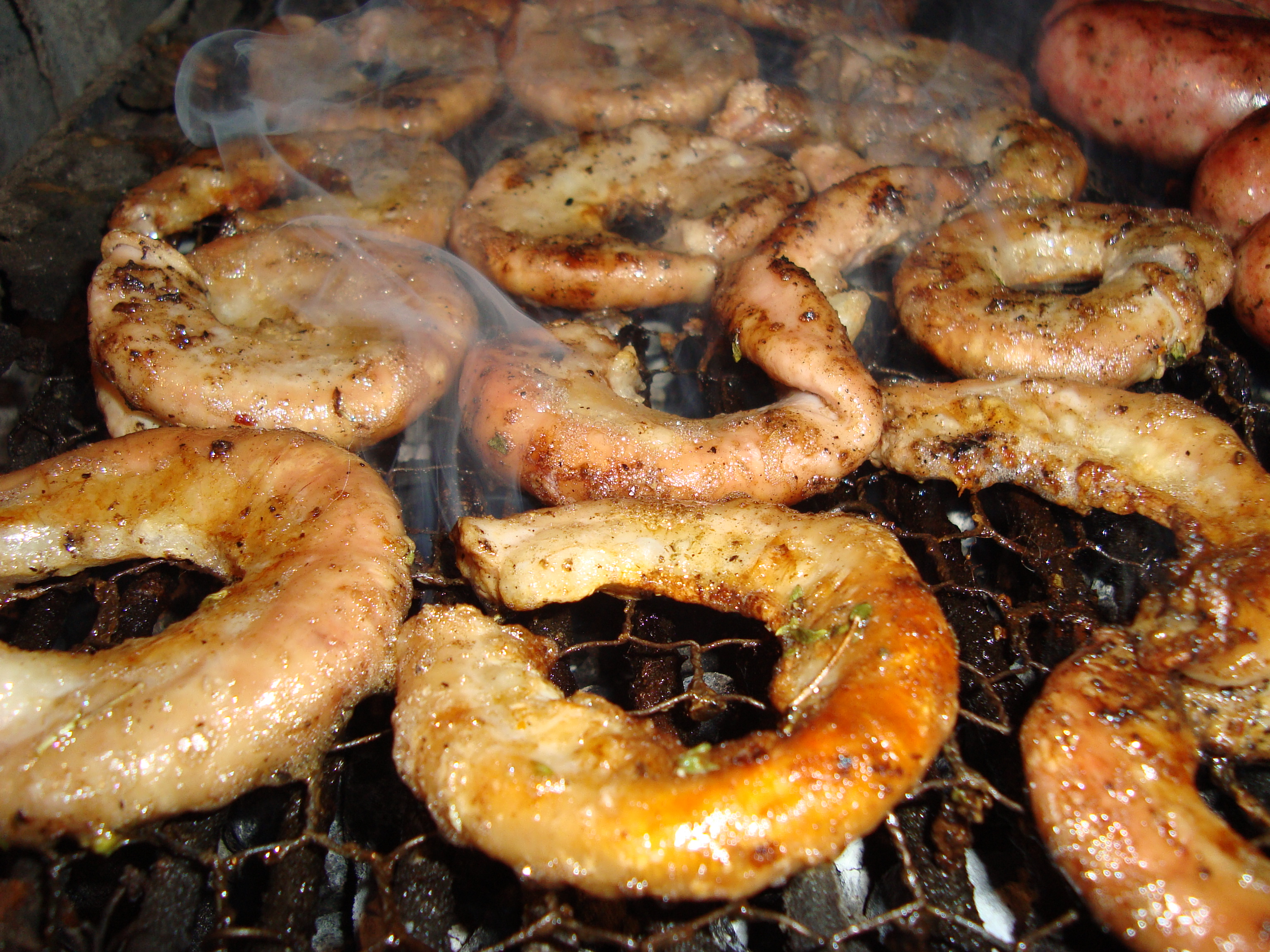
- Chunchulines being roasted using charcoal.
- Place of origin: Latin America
- Region or state: North America and South America
- Main ingredients: Pork, beef, or lamb small intestine

Chunchullo is beef small intestine, which may be grilled or fried. It is consumed in many Latin American countries.

In some countries, chunchullo is grilled over wood or charcoal. In Colombia, Argentina, Paraguay, Uruguay, Peru, Chile and Ecuador, however, it is usually roasted. Despite its long cooking requirement, it is usually the first dish served in a Paraguayan, Uruguayan, or Argentinian asado.

They are presented in the form of a braid.

== Names and characteristics according to country ==
=== Argentina, Uruguay, and Paraguay ===
Known as chinchulín and typically roasted. The large intestine, in Argentina, is called tripa gorda ('big tripe') or torch and cooked similarly, except that they are usually washed inside and filled with the same filling for sausages.

=== Chile ===
Known as chunchules.

=== Colombia ===
Depending on the region it can be called chunchullo, chunchulla, chunchulo, chinchurria or chunchurria. Usually eaten fresh.

=== Ecuador ===
In the cold regions of Ecuador it is known as tripa mishqui. It is roasted and sometimes eaten with boiled potatoes or mote, while in the hotter regions, it goes by the name of tripita. It is grilled and popularly known as street food.

=== Venezuela ===
In Venezuela it is known as chinchurria and is roasted.

=== Peru ===
In Peru this meal is known by a Creole term: choncholi . Prepared steamed and then roasted on a grill, it is a food native to the people of Angola, who were brought to the south of Peru to work the cotton and sugar fields in the province of Ica, south of Lima. It was a food typical of the black population of Peru but now, like kebabs, it is consumed at every social level.

=== Mexico ===
In southern Mexico, the first portion of the small intestine of the cow (the first 3 to 4 metres [10 to 13 ft]) is known as tripa de leche ('tripe of milk'). This is washed thoroughly with tap water, braided and boiled in a pressure cooker for about one hour, because it is very hard. Later, it is fried with garlic and onions and served on fresh tortillas, whole or chopped into cubes, served with hot salsa.

== See also ==
- Chitterlings
- Gopchang
- Isaw
