= Shauna Anderson =

Native American/African American restaurateur, author, historian, and businesswoman

Shauna Anderson is a Native American and African-American restaurateur and author whose work has been accepted into the Smithsonian Anacostia Museum and Center for African American History.

== Early life ==
Anderson was born in Washington, D.C. to Geneva Anderson, a professional singer and piano player and Walter Christopher Holmes, a saxophone player. She was partially raised by her maternal grandmother who taught her how to clean pig intestines.

== Career ==
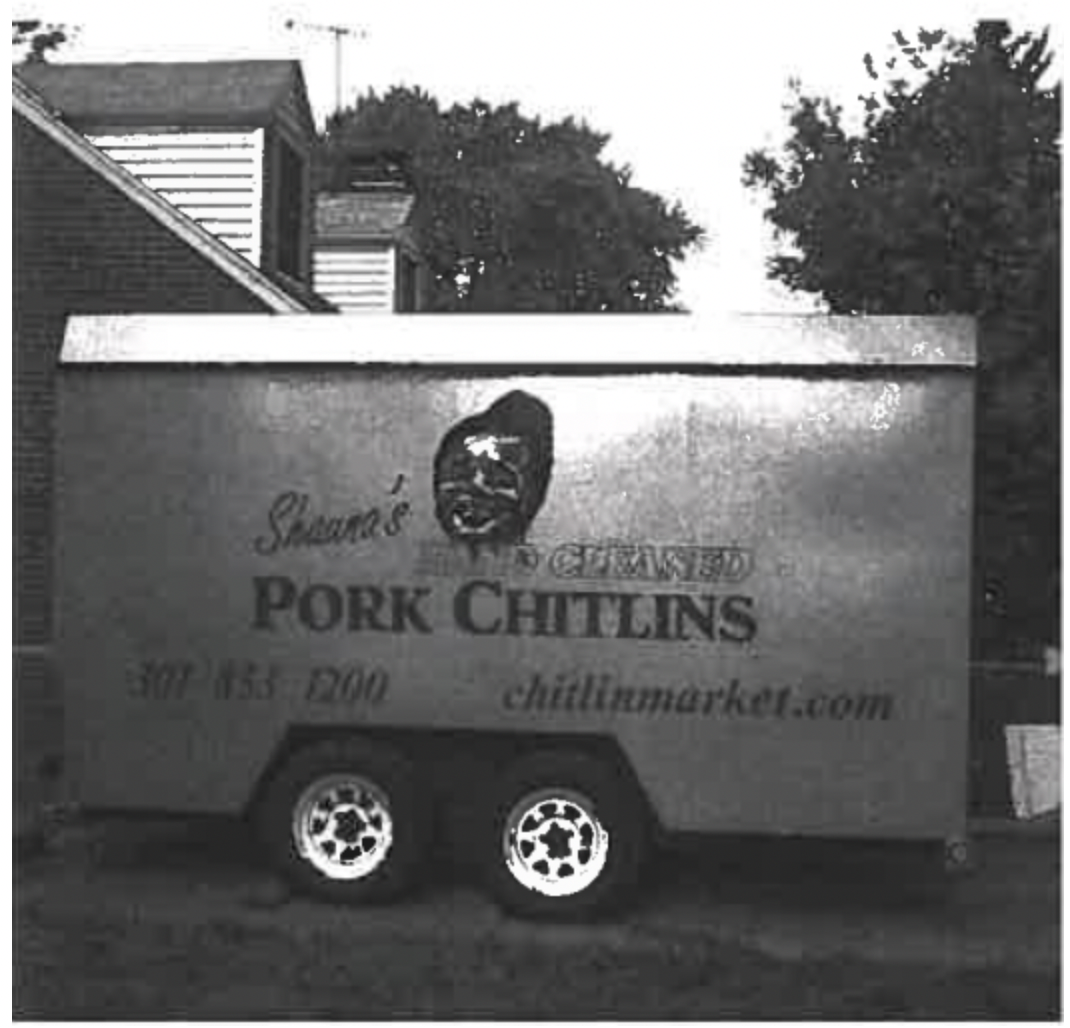
Original Chitlin Market Location

Shauna Anderson worked as an Economic Statistician with the Internal Revenue Service for 15 years. In 1995 opened her restaurant, "The Chitlin Market" in Prince George’s County, Maryland. The following year, she launched a website. .

In 2003, the Smithsonian Institution's Anacostia Museum and Center for African American History and Culture accepted the papers of Shauna Anderson and her restaurant, The Chitlin Market, as part of its emerging collection of materials about African American celebrations, foods and foodways.

In 2006, Anderson sued the county for what she claims were deliberate, concerted efforts to shut down the Chitlin Market. Her legal case was dismissed. In the same year, The Chitlin Market and surrounding area were part of a story line in an episode of ABC’s drama “Commander in Chief” which drew rebuke from county officials due to the negative depiction of the neighborhood. In 2007, the Prince George's County, Maryland government shut down The Chitlin Market when the restaurant's location was rezoned from commercial to residential.

== Books ==
- Anderson, Shauna; Place, Elizabeth, Offal Great-A Memoir from the Queen of Chitlins, Hyattsville, MD 2006. ISBN 978-0-9792878-0-0
