= Shon (given name) =

Shon or Shôn is a given name. Notable people with the name include:

- Shon Boublil, Canadian guitarist
- Shon Coleman (born 1991), American football player
- Shôn Dale-Jones, Welsh writer and performer
- Shon Faye (born 1988), British writer
- Shon Gables, American newscaster
- Shon Greenblatt (born 1967), American actor
- Shon Harris (1968–2014), American author
- Shon Hopwood (born 1975), American lawyer and convicted felon
- Shon J. Manasco (born 1970), American businessman, United States Under Secretary of the Air Force
- Shon McCarthy (born 1973/74), curator
- Shon Siemonek, New Zealand-born rugby union player
- Shon Weissman (born 1996), Israeli footballer

== See also ==
- Shon (Korean surname), surnames are typically listed first in Korean names
- Sean, given name
  - List of people with given name Sean
- Shaun, includes list of people with given name Shaun
- Shawn (given name), includes list of people with given name Shawn
