= John Rusnak =

Former currency trader convicted for bank fraud

- Born: c. 1964
- Education: Bucknell University
- Occupation: Banker (formerly)
- Known for: Allfirst Bank scandal
- Status: Released (January 5, 2009)
- Conviction: Bank fraud (January 17, 2003)
- Penalty: 7.5 years imprisonment

John Rusnak is a former currency trader at Allfirst bank, then part of AIB Group, in Baltimore, Maryland, United States. He is known for committing one of the largest ever cases of bank fraud, where he lost his company US$691 million after a series of bad bets.

== Allfirst scandal ==
On January 17, 2003 Rusnak was sentenced to 7 1/2 years in prison for hiding US$691 million in losses at the bank in 2002, after bad bets snowballed in one of the largest ever cases of bank fraud. He was transferred from prison to a halfway house in June 2008, to home confinement in September 2008, and ultimately released from home confinement on January 5, 2009, serving less than 6 years. Since his return to society, Rusnak has become an advocate for second chances for men coming home from incarceration and for those in drug and alcohol rehabilitation. Rusnak currently serves as the Executive Director of unCUFFED ministries working with juveniles who are incarcerated in adult detention facilities.

Rusnak could have faced up to 30 years in prison. The original 7 1/2 year sentence was part of a plea bargain with US prosecutors. He was released early having earned good-behavior credits and completing a drug treatment program. Upon his release, he started paying US$1,000 a month for the five years of his probation.

Rusnak will remain on the hook for the full $691 million he lost, but prosecutors said the amount he pays back will depend on how much money he is able to make after leaving prison.

Following the scandal, AIB sold Allfirst to M&T Bank of Buffalo, New York, in July 2003. AIB retained 23% of M&T stock. Although the news media blamed the scandal, the merger talks actually began prior to the revelation of the losses. In the banking environment at that time the merger was inevitable. Over 1,100 Allfirst employees lost their jobs in the sale.

== See also ==
- List of trading losses
