= Shauna Cooper =

American psychologist

Shauna Michelle Cooper
- Education: University of North Carolina, Chapel Hill (BA); University of Michigan (MA, PhD)
- Scientific career
- Institutions: University of North Carolina, Chapel Hill
- Thesis: Racial Socialization, Perceptions of School Discrimination and the Educational Outcomes of African American Male and Female Adolescents (2005)

Shauna Michelle Cooper is an American psychologist at the University of North Carolina at Chapel Hill. Her research considers how race, culture and context influence the development of African-American young people. She is co-Editor in Chief of Child Development, the flagship journal of the Society for Research in Child Development (SRCD).

== Early life and education ==
Cooper studied psychology at the University of North Carolina at Chapel Hill. Her honors essay considered what influences academic disidentification (i.e. the rejection of academic identity). She moved to the University of Michigan for her graduate studies, where she focussed on developmental psychology and completed her PhD in Psychology in 2005. Her dissertation on racial socialization and perceptions of school discrimination was mentored by Stephanie J. Rowley.

In 2005 Cooper was appointed an Eunice Kennedy Shriver National Institute of Child Health and Human Development Fellow at the University of North Carolina at Chapel Hill.

== Research and career ==
In 2007 Cooper joined the University of South Carolina as an assistant professor in psychology. She was awarded an National Science Foundation CAREER Award to investigate how the engagement of African-American fathers impacted the social adjustment and academic attainment of early adolescents.

She moved to the University of North Carolina at Chapel Hill as an associate professor in 2017. Her research considers family socialisation, race-related experiences and developmental transitions. At UNC-Chapel Hill, Cooper leads the STAR (Strengths, Assets & Resilience) Laboratory. The STAR lab consider the roles of African-American mothers and fathers in the lives of young people. Alongside studying the dynamics of African-American families, Cooper has investigated the relationship between race-relations and family finance.

During the COVID-19 pandemic, Cooper expressed concern about how the stress of the pandemic was impacting young people's mental health.

== Awards and honours ==
She was named the 2018 University of North Carolina at Chapel Hill Thorp Faculty Engaged Scholar. Cooper has served on the SRCD Equity & Justice Committee and the Society for Research in Adolescence consensus committee. Alongside her academic research, Cooper is involved with the training and mentoring of early career psychologists, particularly those from communities of colour.

== Select publications ==
- Wallace, John M.; Bachman, Jerald G.; O'Malley, Patrick M.; Schulenberg, John E.; Cooper, Shauna M.; Johnston, Lloyd D. (2003). "Gender and ethnic differences in smoking, drinking and illicit drug use among American 8th, 10th and 12th grade students, 1976–2000". Addiction. 98 (2): 225–234. doi:10.1046/j.1360-0443.2003.00282.x. hdl:2027.42/73026. ISSN 1360-0443. PMID 12534428.
- Wallace, John M.; Bachman, Jerald G.; O'Malley, Patrick M.; Johnston, Lloyd D.; Schulenberg, John E.; Cooper, Shauna M. (2002). "Tobacco, alcohol, and illicit drug use: racial and ethnic differences among U.S. high school seniors, 1976-2000". Public Health Reports. 117 (Suppl 1): S67 – S75. ISSN 0033-3549. PMC 1913705. PMID 12435829.
- Cooper, Shauna M.; Brown, Charity; Metzger, Isha; Clinton, Yvette; Guthrie, Barbara (2013-01-01). "Racial Discrimination and African American Adolescents' Adjustment: Gender Variation in Family and Community Social Support, Promotive and Protective Factors". Journal of Child and Family Studies. 22 (1): 15–29. doi:10.1007/s10826-012-9608-y. ISSN 1573-2843. S2CID 144846630.=
