= Shaun Ollison =

Shaun Ollison (born La Shaunda Sha'vonne Ollison May 7, 1980 Berkeley, California) was the first black woman crowned Ms. San Francisco (1998) and Ms. California (2000).

In 2001, Ollison moved to Paris, France and began her career as an international top model. Whilst in Europe, Ollison decided to contribute to the cause of the re-development of Africa, and to issues concerning the continent. She has also coordinated exchanges between African natives and the African Diaspora.

Currently, Ollison is the godmother for a school of orphaned children in Ouidah, Benin. She, along with the school's leaders, have established a pen pal exchange between them and children in the United States.

Ollison is also a member of the African Union, the only model so included. She is the (US) ambassador to the refugees of the Ivory Coast, and founder/CEO of Ellüre Ja'tie, an organization created to support models, designers, and artists of the diaspora.
