= Seana =

Seana or Seána is a female given name. Notable people with the name include:

- Seána Kerslake (born 1990), Irish actress
- Seana Kofoed (born 1970), American television actress
- Seana McKenna (born 1956), Canadian actress
- Seana Shiffrin, American professor
- Seána Talbot, British healthcare manager and charity leader
