= Shane =

Shane may refer to:

== People ==
- Shane (name), a masculine given name and a surname, including a list of people and fictional characters with this name
- Shane (actress) (born 1969), American pornographic actress
- Shane (New Zealand singer) (born 1946)
- iamnotshane (born 1995), formerly known as Shane, American singer

== Arts, entertainment, and media ==
=== Literature and adaptations ===
- Shane (novel), a 1949 Western novel by Jack Schaefer
  - Shane (film), a 1953 movie based on Schaefer's book
  - Shane (American TV series), a 1966 American television series based on Schaefer's book, starring David Carradine, that aired on ABC

=== Other uses in arts, entertainment, and media ===
- Shane (British TV series), 2004 sitcom written by and starring Frank Skinner
- The Shanes (German band), a German rock band
- The Shanes (Swedish band), a Swedish rock band

== Other uses ==
- 1994 Shane, an asteroid
- Shane Building, a historic building in Hollywood, California
- Shane Company, a jewelry store
- Shane English School, an English conversation school in Japan and other Asian countries
- Oromo Liberation Army, an armed group in Ethiopia that the country's government calls "OLF-Shene", also spelled "Shane"

== See also ==
- Shayne (disambiguation)
