= Shana =

Shana or Shanna may refer to:

== People ==
=== Shana ===
- Shana (singer), American singer Shana Petrone (born 1972)
- Shana Alexander (1925–2005), American journalist
- Shana Cox (born 1985), American sprinter competing for Great Britain
- Shana Dale (born 1964), NASA deputy administrator
- Shana Hiatt (born 1975), American model and presenter
- Shana Loxton-Vernaton (born 2007), French rhythmic gymnast
- Shana Madoff (born 1967), American attorney, compliance officer and attorney at the securities firm of Ponzi schemer Bernie Madoff, her uncle
- Shana Morrison (born 1970), Irish-American singer-songwriter
- Shana Petrone (born 1972), American singer
- Shana Swash (born 1990), British actress

=== Shanna ===
- Shanna, Belgian eurodance singer
- Shanna Besson (born 1993), French actress
- Shanna (wrestler), Portuguese professional wrestler
- Shanna Collins (born 1983), American actress
- Shanna Compton, American poet
- Shanna Hogan (1982–2020), American writer
- Shanna Hudson (born 1985), Haitian footballer
- Shanna McCullough (born 1960), American pornographic actress
- Shanna Moakler (born 1975), American model, actress and reality television star
- Shanna Reed (born 1955), American dancer and actress
- Shanna Shannon (born 2006), Indonesian singer, actress, and YouTuber
- Shanna Swendson, American author
- Shanna Woyak, United States Air Force major general
- Shanna Young (born 1991), American mixed martial artist
- Shanna Zolman (born 1983), American professional basketball player

== Fictional characters ==
- Shana Elmsford, in the 1980s cartoon series Jem
- Shana, in the 1999 video game The Legend of Dragoon
- Shana, in Shakugan no Shana
- Shana Fring, in the Pretty Little Liars book series
- Shanna the She-Devil, a jungle adventurer in the Marvel Comics universe
- Shanna, from the video game Fire Emblem: The Binding Blade

== Places ==
- Kurilsk, called Shana when it was under Japanese rule
- Shana, several towns and a clan during the Japanese administration of the Kuril Islands

== Other uses ==
- Shana people, a minority tribe in eastern Uganda
- Shakugan no Shana, also known as simply Shana, a Japanese media franchise
