= List of people with surname O'Neill =

This is a list of people with surname O'Neill, including the variant spellings O'Neil and O'Neal.

== People ==
=== A ===
- Alan O'Neill (footballer, born 1957), Irish football player
- Alan O'Neill (footballer, born 1973), Irish football player
- Alexander O'Neal (born 1953), American musician
- Alexandre O'Neill (1924–1986), Portuguese writer
- Alexander O'Neill aka Alexx O'Nell (born 1980), American musician and actor
- Amber O'Neal (born 1974), American professional wrestler
- Amos O'Neal, American politician
- Amy O'Neill (born 1971), an actress/performer
- Ana María O'Neill, an educator, author and advocate of women's rights
- Andrew O'Neill (born 1979), English vegan, anarchist, transvestite, stand-up comedian, musician and writer
- Anthony O'Neill (born 1964), Australian fiction writer
- Aisling O'Neill, Irish actress
- April O'Neil, a fictional character in the Teenage Mutant Ninja Turtles franchise
- Arthur Joseph O'Neill (1917–2013), an American bishop of the Roman Catholic Church
- Arthur O'Neill (1876–1914), was an Irish Ulster Unionist Party politician
- Arturo O'Neill (1736–1814), an Irish-born colonel who served the Spanish crown as governor of several places in New Spain (1781–1794)

=== B ===
- Barbara O'Neil, American film and stage actress
- Bernie O'Neill (politician), member of the Pennsylvania House of Representatives
- Bernie O'Neill (bowls), Northern Irish lawn bowler
- Bernie O'Neill (Gaelic footballer) (born 1945), Irish Gaelic footballer
- Bill O'Neill (1880–1920), Canadian-born Major League Baseball player
- Bill O'Neill (born 1981), American professional bowler
- Billy O'Neill (rugby) (1878–1955), Welsh international rugby union player
- Billy O'Neill (footballer), Irish professional footballer
- Birch O'Neal (c. 1913–1995), FBI/CIA agent
- Brendan O'Neill (businessman) (born 1948), British business executive
- Brendan O'Neill (journalist), English journalist
- Brian O'Neill (ice hockey, born 1929), Canadian executive within the National Hockey League
- Brian O'Neill (ice hockey, born 1988), American ice hockey player
- Brian O'Neill (1574), chief of the O'Neills of Clanaboy, surrendering his title to Sir Philip Sidney for a knighthood in 1567
- Brian O'Neill (superintendent) (1941–2009), American superintendent of the Golden Gate National Recreation Area
- Brian O'Neill (American football) (born 1995), American football player
- Bryan O'Neil (1905–1954), British archaeologist and historian
- Buckey O'Neill (1860–1898), American soldier, sheriff, newspaper editor, miner, politician, gambler and lawyer
- Byron O'Neill (born 1970), American artist

=== C ===
- Calvin O'Neal, American football linebacker
- Carol O'Neal (born 1948), American model and Playboy magazine's Playmate of the Month in July 1972
- Catherine O'Neill (cricketer), New Zealand-born Irish cricketer
- Cathy O'Neil, American mathematician
- Ceadach O'Neill, Northern Irish footballer
- Charles Duncan O'Neal (1879–1936), Barbados politician and physician
- Charles O'Neal (1904–1996), American film and television screenwriter
- Christopher John O'Neill, Broadway actor
- Chris O'Neill, Irish animator and YouTuber
- Connor O'Neill, fictional Northern Irish character in the Australian soap opera Neighbours
- C. William O'Neill (1916–1978), American politician
- Carlos O'Neill (1760–1835), titular head of the Clanaboy O'Neill dynasty
- Cecily O'Neill, authority on Process drama and the arts in education
- Charles O'Neill (musician), Canadian bandmaster and composer
- Charles O'Neill (engineer) (1828–1900), Australasian engineer, inventor, parliamentarian and philanthropist
- Charles H. O'Neill (c. 1800–1897), Irish-born American politician and mayor
- Charles O'Neill (Pennsylvania politician) (1821–1893), American politician
- Charles O'Neill, 1st Earl O'Neill (1779–1841), British politician, peer and landowner
- Chloe Ann O'Neil (1943–2018), New York politician
- Christopher O'Neill (born 1974), British-American businessman and the husband of Princess Madeleine of Sweden
- Cian O'Neill, Irish Gaelic footballer, coach and manager
- Colm O'Neill (Ballyclough Gaelic footballer) (born 1988), Irish sportsman
- Colm O'Neill (Midleton Gaelic footballer) (born 1964), Irish sportsman
- Con O'Neill (actor) (born 1966), British actor
- Con O'Neill (diplomat) (1912–1988), British civil servant and diplomat
- Conn (Constantine) O'Neill, titular head of the Clanaboy O'Neill dynasty

=== D ===
- Dave O'Neal (1937–2021), American politician, Lieutenant Governor of Illinois
- Deltha O'Neal (born 1977), American football player
- Damian O'Neill (born 1961), lead guitarist in the pop-punk band, The Undertones
- Dan O'Neill (born 1942), American underground cartoonist
- Dan O'Neill (writer), American journalist and writer
- Daniel O'Neill (painter) (1920–1974), Irish Romantic painter
- Daniel O'Neill (editor), Irish-born American newspaper editor and owner
- Daria O'Neill (born 1971), American radio and television personality
- Darren O'Neill, an Irish boxer
- Dennis O'Neill (disambiguation), several people
- Dermot O'Neill (disambiguation), several people
- Diarmuid O'Neill (1969–1996), English-born volunteer in the Provisional Irish Republican Army
- Dick O'Neill (1928–1998), American stage, film and television actor
- Don O'Neill (artist), American watercolorist and architect
- Dónal O'Neill (1967–2023), Irish Gaelic footballer
- Donal O'Neill (Gaelic footballer) (born 1988), Irish Gaelic footballer for Galway
- Donal O'Neill (swimmer) (born 1980), Irish swimmer
- Douglas F. O'Neill (born 1968), American Thoroughbred horse trainer

=== E ===
- Eamon O'Neill (born 1944), Northern Irish nationalist politician in Northern Ireland
- Eamonn O'Neill (died 3 November 1954), Irish Cumann na nGaedhael and later Fine Gael party politician
- Edward O'Neill (disambiguation), several people
- Ed O'Neill (born 1946), American actor
- Ed O'Neal (1936–2022), American musician, of the Dixie Melody Boys
- Edward J. O'Neill (general) (1902–1979), American US Army officer
- Edward L. O'Neill (1903–1948), American politician
- Edward O'Neill, 2nd Baron O'Neill (1839–1928), Irish peer and politician
- Eliza O'Neill (1791 – 29 October 1872), Irish actress, later baronetess
- Elizabeth O'Neill Verner (1883–1979), artist, author and lecturer
- Ella O'Neill, mother of playwright Eugene O'Neill and wife of actor James O'Neill
- Emmett O'Neill (1918–1993), American Major League Baseball pitcher
- Eric O'Neill (born 1973), American former FBI operative
- Eric O'Neill (American football) (born 2003), American football player
- Eugene M. O'Neill (1850–1926), Irish-born American lawyer and newspaper owner
- Eugene O'Neill (hurler) (born 1978), Irish sportsperson
- Eugene O'Neill (1888–1953), American playwright, and Nobel laureate in Literature
- Eunan O'Neill (born 1982), Northern Irish television presenter
- Evan O'Neill Kane (1861–1932), surgeon working in Pennsylvania, US
- Edward Asbury O'Neal (1818–1890), American Confederate general during the American Civil War
- Emmet O'Neal (1853–1922), American Democratic politician who was Governor of Alabama

=== F ===
- Frank O'Neal, American cartoonist
- Frederick O'Neal (1905–1992), American actor and television director
- Fabián O'Neill (born 1973), Uruguayan former football midfielder
- Felim O'Neill of Kinard, Irish nobleman who led the Irish Rebellion of 1641 in Ulster
- Francis O'Neill (1848–1936), Irish-born American police chief and author of several Irish music collections
- Frank "Buck" O'Neill (1875–1958), American head football coach
- Frank O'Neill (footballer, born 1940) (born 1940), Irish footballer

=== G ===
- Gail O'Neill, American model and television journalist
- Gary O'Neill, various people
- Gene O'Neill, American novelist
- George Bernard O'Neill (1828–1917), Irish genre painter
- George O'Neill (footballer, born 1942) (born 1942), Scottish footballer who played and managed in the US in his later career
- George O'Neill (footballer, born 1923) (1923–2003), English footballer
- Gerard K. O'Neill (1927–1992), American scientist
- Gerard M. O'Neill (1942–2019), American journalist and writer
- Griffin O'Neal (born 1964), American actor
- Gwendolyn O’Neal (born 1946), American academic administrator and home economist

=== H ===
- Harriet O'Neill, American judge
- Harry O'Neill (disambiguation), several people
- Heather O'Neill (born 1973), Canadian novelist, poet, short story writer, screenwriter and journalist
- Henrique O'Neill, 1st Viscount of Santa Mónica, Portuguese noble and politician
- Henry O'Neill (disambiguation), several people
- Holly O'Neill (born 1998), Canadian soccer player
- Howard S. O'Neill (1883–1966), American politician and lawyer
- Hugh McShane O'Neill, Irish nobleman and rebel in the 16th and 17th centuries
- Hugh O'Neill (disambiguation), several people
- Hugo José Jorge O'Neill (1874–1940), Portuguese nobleman

=== I ===
- Isabelle Ahearn O'Neill (1880–1975), stage and screen actor and Rhode Island legislator
- Israel C. O'Neal (1818–1899), American politician from Virginia
- Ivan O'Neal, Vincentian political leader

=== J ===
- Jack O'Neill, a fictional character in the Canadian-American SyFy television series Stargate SG-1
- Jamie O'Neal (born Jamie Murphy, 1968), Australian country singer and songwriter
- Jermaine O'Neal (born 1978), American NBA basketball player
- Jim O'Neal (born 1948), American blues expert, writer, record producer and record company executive
- Joseph T. O'Neal, American politician
- Johnny O'Neal, American jazz pianist
- Jack O'Neill (baseball) (1873–1935), Irish-American baseball catcher
- Jack O'Neill (businessman) (1923–2017), American businessman
- Jack O'Neill (disambiguation)
- Jacquie O'Neill (born 1969), English illustrator
- James O'Neill (disambiguation), several people
- Jamie O'Neill (born 1962), Irish authoer
- Jamie O'Neill (snooker player), English snooker player
- Jan Lehane (born 1941), married name O'Neill, Australian tennis player
- Jeff O'Neill (born 1976), Canadian broadcaster and former ice hockey player
- Jeffrey O'Neill (disambiguation), several people
- Jennifer O'Neill, American actress and model
- Jevon O'Neill, British film director and producer
- Jim O'Neill (disambiguation), several people
- Jimmy O'Neill (footballer, born 1931) (1930–2007), Irish football goalkeeper
- Jimmy O'Neill (footballer, born 1941), Northern Irish footballer
- João O'Neill
- João Pedro Torlades O'Neill
- Joaquim Torlades O'Neill
- Joe O'Neill, English footballer
- John Johnston O'Neill (1886–1966), Canadian geologist and academic
- John Joseph O'Neill (journalist) (1889–1953), American journalist
- John Joseph O'Neill (British politician) (1888–1953), English Liberal MP
- John Joseph O'Neill (American politician) (1846–1898), U.S. Representative from Missouri
- John O'Neill (disambiguation), several people
- John Raymond O'Neill, Canadian politician
- Jonjo O'Neill (jockey) (born 1952), Irish National Hunt racehorse trainer and jockey
- Jorge Maria O'Neill
- Jorge Torlades O'Neill I
- Jorge Torlades O'Neill II
- José Carlos O'Neill
- José Maria O'Neill
- Josh O'Neill (born 1988), American wheelchair rugby player
- Joseph O'Neill (disambiguation), several people
- Julian O'Neill (New Zealand rugby league), New Zealand rugby league footballer who played in England
- Julian O'Neill, Australia rugby league footballer
- Juliet O'Neill, Canadian journalist

=== K ===
- Kathleen O'Neal Gear (born 1954), American writer
- Kate Tenforde (née O'Neill; born 1980), American long-distance runner
- Kay O'Neill, illustrator and writer from New Zealand
- Keith O'Neill (disambiguation), several people
- Ken O'Neal (born 1962), American football player
- Kevin O'Neill (disambiguation), several people
- Kim L. O'Neill, Irish biologist in the United States
- Kitty O'Neil (1946–2018), American stuntwoman and racer

=== L ===
- Leon O'Neal Jr. (born 1998), American football player
- Leslie O'Neal (born 1964), American football player
- Laurence O'Neill, Irish politician
- Lawrence Joseph O'Neill, American judge
- Lawrence O'Neill (disambiguation), several people
- Linda O'Neill, Australian soccer player
- Louis O'Neill (diplomat), American diplomat and attorney
- Luke O'Neill (disambiguation), several people

=== M ===
- Madeline O'Neill (born 1867/68), British tennis player
- Maggie O'Neill, British actress
- Máire O'Neill (born 1978), Irish data encryption academic
- Maire O'Neill (1886– 1952), Irish actress
- Margaret O'Neill Eaton (1799–1879), wife of John Eaton, involved in the Petticoat Affair
- María de Mater O'Neill (born 1960), Puerto Rican artist, designer and educator
- Maria O'Neill, Portuguese member of the Clanaboy O'Neill dynasty
- Mark O'Neill (disambiguation), several people
- Martha Mary O'Neill, aka 'Mother Patricia', Irish-Australian Sister of Charity
- Martin O'Neill, Baron O'Neill of Clackmannan
- Martin O'Neill, Northern Irish footballer and manager
- Marty O'Neill (born 1965), Canadian lacrosse player and manager
- Mary Auguste O'Neill
- Mary Devenport O'Neill, Irish poet
- Mary O'Neill (Canadian politician), Canadian politician
- Mary-Anne O'Neill, Australian politician
- Mary Lovelace O'Neal (1942–2026), American visual artist and arts educator
- Mary Thomas O'Neal (1887 – after 1974), Welsh-born American labor activist
- Maston E. O'Neal Jr. (1907–1990), American politician
- Matthew O'Neill (disambiguation), several people
- Maurice O'Neill (Irish republican), (d.1942), Executed Irish Republican
- Melinda O'Neal, American conductor of choral music
- Merlin O'Neill (1898–1981), Commandant of the United States Coast Guard 1950 to 1954
- Michael O'Neill (disambiguation), several people
- Michelle O'Neill, Irish politician, deputy First Minister of Northern Ireland since 2020, Vice President of Sinn Féin since 2018
- Mike O'Neal (born 1951), Kansas Republican politician
- Mildred O'Neill (1914? – 2003), wife of Speaker of the United States House of Representatives Tip O'Neill
- Moira O'Neill, pseudonym of Agnes Shakespeare Higginson (1864–1955), Irish-Canadian poet
- Morgan O'Neill, Australian writer, director, actor and producer

=== N ===
- Nathan O'Neill, Australian cyclist
- Nicholas O'Neill (disambiguation), several people
- Norm O'Neill, Australian cricketer
- Norman O'Neill (1875–1934), English composer and conductor

=== O ===
- Onora O'Neill, Baroness O'Neill of Bengarve
- Oona O'Neill, American actress
- Owen Roe O'Neill (c.1585 – 1649), Gaelic Irish soldier
- O'Neal Compton (1951–2019), American film and television actor
- O'Neill Donaldson (born 1969), English footballer
- O'Neill Spencer (1909–1944), American jazz drummer and singer
- Sir Neil O'Neill, Irish chieftain

=== P ===
- Patrice O'Neal (1969–2011), American comedian
- Patrick O'Neal (disambiguation), several people
- Peggy O'Neal (disambiguation), several people
- Pete O'Neal (born 1940), American Black Panther Party member
- Pat O'Neill (disambiguation), several people
- Patrick O'Neill (disambiguation), several people
- Paul O'Neill (disambiguation), several people
- Pauline O'Neill (disambiguation), several people
- Pearse O'Neill, Irish Gaelic footballer
- Peggy O'Neil (1898–1960), Irish-American actress
- Peter O'Neal, American politician
- Peter O'Neill, former prime minister of Papua New Guinea
- Phelim (Felix) O'Neill
- Phelim Caoch O'Neill (1517–1542), prince of the Cenél nEógain
- Phelim O'Neill, 2nd Baron Rathcavan

=== R ===
- Raiqwon O'Neal (born 2000), American football player
- Ralph Ambrose O'Neill (1896–1980), American flying ace from World War I
- Rebecca O'Neill (born 1981), New Zealand football player
- Richard O'Neill (disambiguation), several people
- Riley O'Neill (born 1985), Canadian soccer player
- Robert O'Neal (American football) (born 1971), former American football cornerback
- Robert O'Neal (murderer) (1961–1995), American white supremacist and convicted murderer executed in Missouri
- Robert O'Neill (disambiguation), several people
- Robin O'Neil, British historian
- Rose O'Neill (1874–1944), American illustrator
- Ryan O'Neill (disambiguation), several people
- Ralph T. O'Neal (1933–2019), British Virgin Islands politician
- Reagan O'Neal, one of several pseudonyms of James Oliver Rigney Jr (1948–2007), American writer
- Ronan O'Neill, Irish Gaelic footballer
- Ron O'Neal (1937–2004), American actor, director and screenwriter
- Rose O'Neal Greenhow (1817–1864), Confederate spy
- Ryan O'Neal (born 1941), American actor

=== S ===
- Séamus Ó Néill (1910–1986), Irish writer
- Shareef O'Neal (born 2000), American basketball player and son of Shaquille
- Shaquille O'Neal (born 1972), American basketball player
- Stanley O'Neal (born 1951), American business executive
- Steve O'Neal (born 1946), American football punter
- Seán O'Neill (born 1938), Northern Irish Gaelic footballer
- Sean O'Neill (table tennis) (born 1967), American table tennis player and coach
- Shane O'Neill (Irish chieftain) (c. 1530–1567), Irish chief of the O'Neill clan of Ulster
- Shane O'Neill (Irish exile) (c. 1599 – 29 January 1641), youngest son of Hugh O'Neill, Earl of Tyrone
- Shane O'Neill (Cork hurler) (born 1986), Irish sportsperson
- Shannon O'Neill (comedian), American comedian
- Shannon O'Neill (politician) (born 1937), Canadian politician
- Sharon O'Neill (born 1952), New Zealand singer-songwriter and pianist
- Sid O'Neill (1888—1915), Australian rules footballer
- Simon O'Neill (born 1971), New Zealand-born operatic tenor
- Stephen O'Neill (born 1980), Irish Gaelic footballer
- Steve O'Neill (1891–1962), American catcher, manager, coach and scout in Major League Baseball
- Steve O'Neill (owner) (1899–1983), American owner of a professional baseball team
- Steve O'Neill (rugby league) (born 1958), English rugby league footballer
- Susie O'Neill (born 1973), Australian swimmer

=== T ===
- Tara Lynne O'Neill, Northern Irish actress
- Ted O'Neill, Dean of Admissions at the University of Chicago
- Terence O'Neill, Baron O'Neill of the Maine (1914–1990), the fourth Prime Minister of Northern Ireland
- Terry O'Neill (feminist) (born c. 1953), American attorney, professor and activist for social justice
- Terry O'Neill (martial artist) (born 1948), English actor and martial artist
- Terry O'Neill (photographer) (1938–2019), English photographer
- Thomas Newman O'Neill Jr. (1928–2018), American federal judge
- Thomas O'Neill (journalist) (1904–1971), American journalist
- Thomas O'Neill (Canadian politician) (1882–1965), Canadian politician
- Thomas P. O'Neill III (born 1945), American politician
- Tim O'Neill (Canadian football) (born 1979), Canadian football player
- Timothy O'Neill (soccer) (born 1982), American soccer player
- Tip O'Neill (1912–1994), American politician
- Tip O'Neill (baseball) (1858–1915), Canadian left fielder in Major League Baseball
- Titus O'Neil (born 1977; real name Thaddeus Bullard), American professional wrestler
- Todd O'Neill (born 1982), American singer
- Tom O'Neill (ice hockey) (1923–1973), Canadian ice hockey player
- Tommy O'Neill (born 1955), Scottish football midfielder
- Tony O'Neill, New York-based musician and author
- Tatum O'Neal (born 1963), American actress
- Tirlough Brassileagh Ó Neill, son of Phelim Caoch O'Neill, Prince of the Cenél nEógain
- Turlough Luineach Ó Neill (1532–1595), Irish earl of the Clan-Connell, inaugurated as the King of Tyrone
- Ty O'Neal (born 1978), American actor
- Tyler O'Neill (born 1995), Canadian baseball player

=== W ===
- Ward O'Neill (born 1951), Australian illustrator, caricaturist and cartoonist
- Wes O'Neill (born 1986), Canadian ice hockey player
- Willa O'Neill, New Zealand actress
- William O'Neill (Connecticut politician) (1930–2007), American Governor of Connecticut
- William O'Neill (Ohio jurist) (born 1947), American lawyer, jurist and appellate judge
- William O'Neill, 1st Baron O'Neill (1813–1883), Anglo-Irish hereditary peer, clergyman and musical composer
- William T. O'Neil (1850–1909), New York politician
- William J. O'Neil, American entrepreneur, stockbroker and writer
- William O' Neil (1848–?), member of the Wisconsin Legislature

=== Y ===
- Yvonne O'Neill (1936–2010), Canadian politician
