= Carlos O'Neill =

Portuguese trader (1760–1835)

Carlos O'Neill (9 June 1760 – 24 June 1835), was the titular head of a branch of the Clanaboy O'Neill dynasty, whose family has been based in Portugal since the 18th century.

== Life ==
Carlos O'Neill was born in Lisbon, the first child and only son of the previous head João O'Neill and wife, Valentina.

O'Neill was a trader, a Professed Knight of the Knight of the Order of Christ, Lord of many Majorats and of the Farms Quinta dos Bonecos and Quinta da Saboaria, at the term of Setúbal, etc. He inherited from his father-in-law the Casa Comercial Torlades, of which he became the Main Manager, and the Farm Quinta das Machadas, in the Parish of São Julião, term of Setúbal, of which he became Lord by purchase from the Botelho de Moraes Sarmento family, Lords of the Major Guard of the Salt of Setubal and Counts of Armamar, who owned Quinta das Machadas since circa 1610.

On 25 May 1825 the Farm was visited by King John VI of Portugal, accompanied by the Infanta Isabel Maria of Portugal and the Infanta Maria da Assunção of Portugal, and by the Court, being received and hosted by its Proprietor, the mentioned Carlos O'Neill, for whom the mentioned farm had passed on to, by marriage, by which the Crest of the O'Neill Family was placed over the door of the western front, etc.

== Marriage and issue ==
He married in Lisbon, Sacramento, on 17 September 1784 to Ana João Torlade, daughter of Jacob Frederico Torlade and wife Maria Inácia Gonçalves, and had issue, nine children:

- Maria Felizarda O'Neill (Setúbal, Santa Maria da Graça, 29 June 1785 – Lisbon, Santa Catarina, 8 April 1831), married Lisbon, Santa Catarina, 2 May 1801 João António de Amorim Viana (Lisbon, São Paulo, 16 April 1777 – ?), Supernumerary Moço of the Bedchamber of the Royal Household of His Most Faithfull Majesty (Alvará of 21 October 1822), Squire-Fidalgo of the Royal Household and Knight-Fidalgo of the Royal Household (Alvará of 18 November 1822), Professed Knight of the Order of Christ, Lieutenant-Colonel of the Gunner Battalion of East Lisbon and a great Capitalist, etc., son of João António de Amorim Viana and wife Ana Maria Febrónia de Jesus Fernandes Branco, and had issue
- José Maria O'Neill (Setúbal, São Sebastião or Santa Maria da Graça, 14 April 1788 – ?)
- Maria João O'Neill (Setúbal, Santa Maria da Graça, 9 September 1789 – Porto, 22 October 1847), married firstly 27 July 1811 João Pedro de Roure (Lisbon, 30 January 1783 – London, Greater London, 25 May 1825), brother of her brother in law Guilherme de Roure, and had issue, and married secondly to João Teixeira de Melo, without issue
- Maria Valentina O'Neill (Setúbal, São Julião, 9 October 1790 – ?), married Lisbon, Encarnação, 18 May 1809 John Morice, a British subject, and had issue
- Maria Carlota O'Neill (Setúbal, São Julião, 13 April 1792 – ?), married to Guilherme de Roure, brother of her brother in law João Pedro de Roure, and had issue
- Henrique O'Neill (Setúbal, São Julião, 8 May 1794 – ?), Commander of the Order of Christ, Knight, Commander and 132nd Grand Cross of the Royal Order of Our Lady of Concepcion of Vila Viçosa, Receiver-General of the Province of Alentejo (28 January 1840), etc., married Évora, Santo Antão (registered Évora, Sé), 13 August 1825 Maria Inocência Pinto da Maia (Évora, Santo Antão, 18 December 1802 – ?), daughter of Manuel Rodrigues Pinto de Oliveira and wife Antónia Margarida da Maia de Vasconcelos da Palma, and had two children:
  - Carlos O'Neill (Setúbal, São Julião, 12 November 1826 – ?), unmarried and without issue
  - Paulina Pinto da Maia O'Neill (Setúbal, São Sebastião, 11 January 1830 – ?), married Setúbal, São Sebastião, 1 June 1848 José de Groot Pombo (Lisbon, Mercês, 1 March 1825 – Setúbal, 24 April 1906), Vereador of the City Council of Setúbal, etc., son of Francisco de Assis de Groot da Silva Pombo and wife and cousin Maria José de Groot, both of Dutch descent, and had issue
- Joaquim Torlades O'Neill (Setúbal, São Julião, 7 November 1795 –), died a child
- Joaquim Maria Torlades O'Neill (Lisbon, Encarnação, 5 February 1798 – ?), Commander of the Order of Christ, Knight of the Royal Order of Our Lady of the Concepcion of Vila Viçosa, etc., married Matosinhos 5 February 1821 Joana Carolina de Brito e Cunha (Porto, Vitória, 18 April 1802 – 5 April 1881), daughter of António Bernardo de Brito e Cunha and wife Teresa Benedita da Silva Pedrosa, and had six children:
  - Carolina Teresa O'Neill (Porto, Vitória, 5 January 1822 – Lisbon, 11 November 1893/1913), married Lisbon, Encarnação, 20 July 1846 her first cousin Jorge Torlades O'Neill I (Lisbon, Encarnação, 15 December 1817 (registered 1825) – 18 November 1890), was the titular head of the Clanaboy O'Neill dynasty, and had issue
  - Carlota Inês O'Neill (Palmela, Santa Maria, 18 February 1824 – 24 April 1858), a distinguished singer, married Lisbon, Encarnação, 30 November 1850 Dr. António Emílio Correia de Sá Brandão (Porto, Cedofeita, 21 January 1821 – Cascais, Monte Estoril, 20 October 1909), Bachelor in Law from the University of Coimbra, Judge-Councillor and President of the Supreme Court of Justice, Minister of Justice, Peer of the Realm (Royal Letter of 31 March 1891), of the Council of His Most Faithfull Majesty, Moço-Fidalgo of the Royal Household, Civil Governor of the Districts of Viana do Castelo, Porto and Coimbra, Deputy, Commander of the Order of Christ, etc., son of José Maria Brandão de Melo Cogominho Correia Pereira de Lacerda and wife Maria Emília Jácome Correia de Sá, and had issue, now extinct
  - Virgínia O'Neill (Setúbal, Anunciada – ?), married Chapel of the Quinta da Saboaria, Anunciada, Setúbal (registered Lisbon, Encarnação), 27 November 1844 her second and third cousin Germano Augusto da Silva Pedrosa Dias Guimarães de Faria e Meneses (Lisbon, Pena, 29 November 1808 – ?), Moço-Fidalgo of the Royal Household (Alvará of 17 October 1826), etc., son of Dr. José António da Silva Pedrosa Guimarães and wife Rita Camila da Silva Guimarães, and had issue
  - Cecília O'Neill (Lisbon, Encarnação, 12 August 1832 – 4 July 1902), unmarried and without issue
  - Guilherme Torlades O'Neill (Lisbon, Santos-o-Velho, 19 May 1836 – Madeira Island, 24 June 1870), a trader, unmarried and without issue
  - João Torlades O'Neill (Lisbon, Santos-o-Velho, 21 January 1838 – 11 November 1900), trader, married Conventual Church of a Madre de Deus, Lisbon (registered Lisbon, Mártires), 15 April 1861 Emília Cristina de Andrade (Lisbon, Mártires, 19 January 1841 – 5 May 1921), daughter of António José de Andrade, trader, and wife Emília dos Reis, and had five children:
    - Maria O'Neill (Lisbon, Mártires, 5 February 1862 – ?), unmarried and without issue
    - Carlos de Andrade O'Neill (Lisbon, Mártires, 20 March 1863 – Lisbon, Mártires, 10 January 1933), married Guilhermina Serzedelo Yglésias (? – Lisbon, 6 June 1927), daughter of Manuel Yglésias and wife Maria Emília Serzedelo, without issue
    - Alfredo O'Neill (Lisbon, Mártires, 25 March 1864 – ?), Moço-Fidalgo of the Royal Household (Alvará of 28 May 1896), unmarried and without issue
    - Luís O'Neill (Lisbon, Mártires, 30 September 1865 – Lisbon, Mártires, 19 December 1942), unmarried and without issue
    - Ricardo O'Neill (Lisbon, Mártires, 19 June 1869 – Lisbon, Mártires, 12 April 1952), Governor of the Companhia Geral de Crédito Predial, etc., unmarried and without issue
- Maria Salomé O'Neill (Lisbon, Encarnação, 22 October 1799 – ?), married Lisbon, Encarnação, 23 November 1816 Patrício João Caffary (or Caffre) (Lisbon – ?), son of João Miguel Caffary (or Caffre) and wife Efigénia Bárbara, and had issue

== See also ==
- Irish nobility
- Irish kings
- Irish royal families
- O'Neill (surname)
- Uí Néill, the Irish Dynasty
- Ó Neill Dynasty Today
- O'Neill of Clannaboy
