= José Maria O'Neill =

Portuguese manager (1788–??)

José Maria O'Neill (Setúbal, São Sebastião or Santa Maria da Graça, 14 April 1788 - ?), was the titular head of a branch of the Clanaboy O'Neill dynasty, whose family has been in Portugal since the 18th century.

== Life ==
He was the first-born son of the previous head Carlos O'Neill and wife Ana João Torlades.

José Maria O'Neill was the Main Manager of the Casa Comercial Torlades, Consul-General of Denmark, Belgium and Greece in Lisbon, a Capitalist, a Commander of the Order of Christ and a Commander of the Royal Order of Our Lady of Concepcion of Vila Viçosa, etc., who also received Queen Maria II of Portugal and King Ferdinand II of Portugal in his House in his Farm (Quinta) of as Machadas, at the term of Setúbal, etc.

== Marriage and issue ==
He married in Lisbon, São Paulo, 11 December 1824, thus legitimizing their already born children, to Ludovina de Jesus Alves Solano (Évora, São Mamede, 1790 - 22 December 1856), daughter of António Alves Miguéis and wife Inácia Solano, of Spanish descent, and had ten children:

- José Carlos O'Neill (Lisbon, Encarnação, 1 August 1815 (registered 1825) – Lisbon, Encarnação, 21 June 1887)
- Carlota O'Neill (Lisbon, Encarnação, 25 August 1816 (registered 1825) - ?), married Lisbon, São Sebastião da Pedreira (registered Lisbon, Encarnação), 3 October 1836 as his first wife her first cousin Guilherme O'Neill de Roure (Paris, Saint Vincent de Paula –), son of Guilherme de Roure and wife Carlota O'Neill, and had issue
- Jorge Torlades O'Neill I (Lisbon, Encarnação, 15 December 1817 (registered 1825) - 18 November 1890)
- Ana O'Neill (Lisbon, Encarnação, 11 March 1819 (registered 1825) - ?), married Lisbon, Encarnação, 8 October 1842 don Antonio Vinent y Vives (Menorca, Mahón - ?), 1st Marquess of Vinent, in Spain (Decree of 15 June 1868), Senator of the Realm, etc., son of don José Vinent and wife doña Juana María Vives, and had issue
- Carlos Torlades O'Neill (30 April 1820 (Baptized Lisbon, São Paulo, 13 May 1822) - ?), married Lisbon, Encarnação, 4 November 1845 Adelaide Carolina Custance (Lisbon, Santiago, 15 September 1821 - ?), daughter of Thomas Parsons Custance, an English subject (married secondly to his aunt Ludovina Cecília O'Neill), and first wife Antónia Eugénia Barbosa de Brito, and had three children:
  - Carlos Tomás O'Neill (Lisbon, Encarnação, 6 December 1846 - ?), married 1873 Maria Carlota Pereira de Eça Infante de Lacerda (Lisbon, 15 July 1852 - Lisbon, 1921), daughter of José António Pereira de Eça and wife Maria da Conceição Infante de Lacerda, and had two children:
    - Maria da Conceição Infante de Lacerda Pereira de Eça Custance O'Neill (19 November 1873 – 23 March 1932)
    - Carlos Torlades O'Neill (Lisbon, São Mamede, 13 December 1874 - Lisbon, Encarnação, 30 July 1960), Merchant in Lisbon, where he lived single, Company Administrator, Member of the Administration Council of the Companhia de Seguros Previdente, married Laura Moreira, without issue
  - Adelaide O'Neill (? - termo of Setúbal, her Quinta dos Bonecos, 14 November 1865), unmarried and without issue
  - Ethelinda O'Neill, unmarried and without issue
- Ludovina Cecília O'Neill (Lisbon, São Paulo, 8 March 1822 - 7 February 1874), married firstly Lisbon, Encarnação, 19 October 1843 as his second wife Thomas Custance (c. 1800 - c. 1855), son of Thomas Parsons Custance, English subject, Protestant, and wife Antónia Eugénia Barbosa de Brito, without issue, and married secondly Lisbon, Santa Maria de Belém, 9 May 1855 Dom Caetano Maria José Baltasar de Paula de Portugal e Castro (Lisbon, São José, 22 September 1824 - Moita, Alhos Vedros, São Lourenço, 30 May 1893), son of Dom José Bernardino de Portugal e Castro, 5th Marquess of Valença, 12th Count of Vimioso, 27th Prime Minister of Portugal, and wife Dona Maria José de Almeida de Noronha, and had issue, four children
- Henrique O'Neill, 1st Viscount of Santa Mónica (Lisbon, 3 August 1823 – Lisbon, 6 November 1889)
- Joaquim Torlades O'Neill (Lisbon, Mercês, 16 May 1826 – ?)
- Maria da Glória O'Neill (Lisbon, Mercês, 1 September 1828 - 21 June 1884), married Lisbon, Encarnação, 9 September 1848 her first cousin João de Sampaio de Roure (Hampstead, London, 16 January 1822 - 12 October 1880), son of João Pedro de Roure and wife Maria João O'Neill, and had issue
- Eduardo Torlades O'Neill (Lisbon, Mercês, 10 December 1829 - 9 June 1876), married his first cousin Efigénia Carolina Caffary (or Caffre) (? - 3 January 1896), daughter of Patrício João Caffary (or Caffre) and wife Maria Salomé O'Neill, and had five children:
  - Ida O'Neill, married her first cousin Roberto O'Neill de Roure (? - 18 January 1902), son of João de Sampaio de Roure and wife and first cousin Maria da Glória O'Neill, and had issue
  - Constantino O'Neill, unmarried and without issue
  - Alice O'Neill (? - 27 September 1878), unmarried and without issue
  - Beatriz O'Neill (? - 3 August 1871), unmarried and without issue
  - Branca O'Neill (? - 17 June 1858), unmarried and without issue
- Valentina O'Neill (Lisbon, Encarnação, 23 September 1834 - ?), unmarried and without issue
- Guilherme Torlades O'Neill (Lisbon, Mercês, 10 August 1830 - 7 July 1886), married Augusta Vicentina de Almeida e Mello (? - 3 May 1884), daughter of Jorge Octávio de Almeida Holtreman and wife Thereza de Mello Fayo, and had one child:
  - Pompeu de Almeida O'Neill (? - 14 March 1909), married Francisca Guilhermina de Almeida, and had issue (in Brazil).

== See also ==
- Irish kings
- Irish nobility
- Irish royal families
- O'Neill of Clannaboy
- Ó Neill Dynasty Today
- O'Neill (surname)
- Uí Néill, the Irish Dynasty
