= Jorge Torlades O'Neill II =

Portuguese businessman of Irish extraction

Jorge Torlades O'Neill (Lisbon, Encarnação, 15 February 1849 – 11 February 1925), was the titular and official head of the Clanaboy O'Neill dynasty, whose family has been in Portugal since the 18th century.

== Style ==
He called himself Count of Tyrone; he presented on the Portuguese Cartory of the Nobility several documents proving his illustrious origin, of which the Clerk of the Nobility passed him a Certificate on 30 June 1902. He was recognized as the Chief of his name by the Somerset Herald, Sir Henry Farnham Burke, in 1896. The Chief Herald of Ireland recognized his grandson as O'Neill of Clanaboy.

== Life ==
He was the first-born son and successor of the previous head Jorge Torlades O'Neill I and wife and first cousin Carolina Teresa O'Neill. He was also the representative of the title of Viscount of Santa Mónica, in Portugal.

Jorge Torlades O'Neill II was an Honorary Officer-Major of the Royal Household, Moço-Fidalgo of the Royal Household with exercise in the Palace (Alvará of 3 December 1881), elected Peer of the Realm, Deputy, Main Manager of the Casa Commercial Torlades, Director of the Banco de Portugal, President of the Administration Council of the Companhia Portuguesa de Phósphoros and of the Companhia dos Telephones, etc.

He was created a Knight of the Sovereign Military Order of Malta, Grand Cross of the Order of St. Gregory the Great of the Holy See and of the Order of Isabel the Catholic of Spain, Officer of the Legion of Honour of France, etc.

He was also a personal friend of King Carlos I of Portugal and Roger Casement. O'Neill donated money to assist the construction of an Irish language school in Tuam and to help arm the Irish Volunteers.

Jorge Torlades O'Neill II owned several properties in and around Lisbon. In Cascais municipality, alone, he commissioned three properties, the Torre de S. Sebastião, the Casa de Santa Maria, and the Casa Verdades de Faria in Estoril. All are now museums.

== Marriage and issue ==
He married in Lisbon, Santos-o-Velho, on 14 July 1873 Maria Isabel Mazziotti Fernandes (Lisbon, São Julião (now extinct), 4 January 1855 – Lisbon, Encarnação, 7 May 1953), daughter of José Gregório Fernandes, Industrialist, great Capitalist and Proprietor, Knight of the Order of Christ, etc., and wife Isabel Maria Mazziotti da Costa Cordeiro, and had four children:

- Hugo José Jorge O'Neill (Lisbon, Santos-o-Velho, 7 June 1874 – Palmela, 30 March 1940)
- Jorge Alberto O'Neill (6 December 1875 – 5 December 1900), unmarried and without issue
- Maria Teresa O'Neill (Oeiras, Carnaxide, 19 July 1878 – Lisbon, 15 August 1958), married Lisbon, Encarnação, 27 January 1898 Dom António de Avillez Lobo de Almeida de Mello e Castro (Amadora or Lisbon, São Sebastião da Pedreira, 27 January 1876 – 5 November 1920), Moço-Fidalgo of the Royal Household with Exercise in the Paço, son of José Ferreira Pinto de Avillez Juzarte de Sousa Tavares or José de Avillez Ferreira Pinto Basto or José de Avillez Juzarte de Sousa Tavares, and first wife Dona Eugénia Maria Lobo de Almeida de Mello e Castro, and had twelve children
- José Carlos Maria Félix Bernardo O'Neill (Lisbon, 8 January 1894 – Lisbon, 9 January 1965), married Lisbon, 22 January 1931 Anna Magdalena Werner (Fribourg, 18 February 1903 – 1988), German Swiss, daughter of Jacob Werner and wife Maria Mathis, and had two children:
  - Bernardo Pedro Jorge Hugo O'Neill (born Geneva, 22 February 1937), Mechanical Engineer from the Instituto Superior Técnico of the University of Lisbon, married Lisbon, Santa Maria de Belém, 21 November 1969 Maria da Assunção Carrilho Ricardo da Costa (born Almodôvar, Almodôvar, 23 November 1943), daughter of Dr Adhemar Salvador Ricardo da Costa, Veterinarian Doctor, and wife Maria Cândida Calado Carrilho, and had issue:
    - José Carlos O'Neill (born Lisbon, São Sebastião da Pedreira, 20 May 1971)
    - Hugo Ricardo O'Neill (born Lisbon, São Sebastião da Pedreira, 23 February 1973)
  - Maria Isabel O'Neill (born Geneva, 29 August 1939), married Palmela 30 April 1960 and divorced Eng. Guilherme Eduardo d'Orey Gaivão (born Cascais, São Domingos de Rana, Sassoeiros, 5 September 1936), Mechanical Engineer from the Instituto Superior Técnico of the University of Lisbon, son of João José de Moura Mascarenhas Gaivão and wife and cousin Luísa Helena Maria Teixeira de Sampaio de Albuquerque d'Orey, and had four children:
    - Maria O'Neill de Mascarenhas Gaivão (born 2 May 1961)
    - João José O'Neill de Mascarenhas Gaivão (born 16 June 1962)
    - Isabel O'Neill de Mascarenhas Gaivão (born 19 June 1963)
    - Pedro Hugo O'Neill de Mascarenhas Gaivão (born 12 March 1968)

== See also ==
- Irish nobility
- Irish kings
- Irish royal families
- O'Neill (surname)
- Uí Néill, the Irish Dynasty
- Ó Neill Dynasty Today
- O'Neill of Clannaboy
