= Felix O'Neill (died 1709) =

Irish chieftain (1670–1709)

Felix O'Neill, also known as Phelim, and in Irish as Féilim Ó Néill (1670 — 11 September 1709, in Malplaquet), was a member of the Clandeboye O'Neill dynasty, and the ancestor of the current Chief of this Catholic Lineage.

== Life ==
In the beginning of the 18th century he was dispossessed of all his assets through the confiscation applied to the Catholics of Ireland, which led him to emigrate to France. He was a cavalry officer who took part in many battles until, integrated in the Irish Brigade, he fought aside with the French against the British, the Austrians and the Dutch (during the War of the Spanish Succession), in the celebrated Battle of Malplaquet (settlement located in the former Province of Flanders, in Belgium, present-day France), and where he died on 11 September 1709.

== Marriages and issue ==
His first marriage was to Catherine Keating, of the noble family of that name, and they had a son, Conn (Constantine) O'Neill, born in Dublin.

His second marriage to The Hon. Joan O'Dempsey (died 17 April 1722), daughter of the Viscount Clanmalier, resulted in three sons: Brian O'Neill, Thomas O'Neill (died before 1756), and a third whose name is not documented.

== See also ==
- Irish nobility
- Irish kings
- Irish royal families
- O'Neill (surname)
- Uí Néill, the Irish Dynasty
- Ó Neill Dynasty Today
- O'Neill of Clannaboy
