= Joaquim Torlades O'Neill =

Portuguese-Irish nobleman

Joaquim Torlades O'Neill (Lisbon, Mercês, 16 May 1826 - ?), was a son of the previous head José Maria O'Neill, the titular head of the Clanaboy O'Neill dynasty, whose family has been in Portugal since the 18th century, and wife Ludovina de Jesus Alves Solano.

== Career ==
He was a trader, Vice-Consul of France, Denmark and the United States of America in Setúbal, etc.

== Marriage and issue ==
He married in Lisbon, Encarnação, on 25 February 1854 to his first cousin Maria Carolina Caffary (or Caffre) (Lisbon, São Paulo, 4 August 1823 - ?), daughter of Patrício João Caffary (or Caffre) and wife Maria Salomé O'Neill, and had two sons:

- João Pedro Torlades O'Neill (Palmela - ?)
- Maria Carolina Caffary O'Neill (Palmela, São Pedro, 22 September 1858 - Setúbal, 26 July 1943), married her cousin Henrique O'Neill de Groot Pombo (Setúbal, São Sebastião, 4 April 1854 - ?), son of José de Groot Pombo, of Dutch descent, and wife Paulina Pinto da Maia O'Neill, without issue

== Relationship and issue ==
He also had five bastard sons by Prudência Gomes:

- Constantino O'Neill, married to Emília Lapido, and had issue, now extinct
- Cristóvão O'Neill, married to Maria da Trindade, and had issue
- Leopoldo O'Neill, unmarried and without issue
- Afonso-Henriques O'Neill, married to Paulina Angriam, might have had issue
- Jaime O'Neill, married to Beatriz ..., and had issue

== See also ==
- Irish nobility
- Irish kings
- Irish royal families
- O'Neill (surname)
- Uí Néill, the Irish Dynasty
- Ó Neill Dynasty Today
- O'Neill of Clannaboy
