= João Pedro Torlades O'Neill =

Portuguese vice-consul (1855–1905)

João Pedro Torlades O'Neill (Palmela, 1 March 1855 – Setúbal, 4 April 1905), was a son of Joaquim Torlades O'Neill and wife and first cousin Maria Carolina Caffary (or Caffre).

== Career ==
He was a Vice-Consul of Belgium in Setúbal, etc.

== Marriage and issue ==
He married in Setúbal, São Sebastião, on 30 November 1876 to Leopoldina Carolina de Almeida Carvalho (Setúbal, São Sebastião, 8 February 1853 – ?), daughter of Dr. João Carlos de Almeida Carvalho, Licentiate in Law from the University of Coimbra, lawyer, Historiographer (dedicating himself a lot to the History of Setúbal, his homeland), journalist, First Officer Tachygrapher of the Secretariat of the Chamber of the Peers of the Realm, etc., and wife and cousin Mariana Inácia Pinto de Carvalho, and had seven children:

- Júlia de Carvalho O'Neill (Setúbal, São Sebastião, 26 August 1877 – Setúbal, São Sebastião, 14 September 1877)
- Amadeu Torlades O'Neill (Setúbal, São Sebastião, 2 November 1878 – ?), unmarried and without issue
- Alfredo Torlades O'Neill (Setúbal, São Sebastião, 23 October 1879 – ?), Moço-Fidalgo of the Royal Household (Alvará of 28 May 1896), married Évora Maria Leonor de Oliveira Fernandes (Évora – ?), daughter of Joaquim José de Matos Fernandes, Farmer and Landowner from a rich Family of Évora, and wife Leonor Augusta do Carmo de Oliveira, and had issue, an only daughter:
  - Leonor Fernandes O'Neill, married her first cousin José O'Neill de Gouveia, son of Serafim de Araújo Gouveia and wife Mariana Carolina de Almeida Carvalho O'Neill/Torlades O'Neill, and had issue
- Júlia Amélia O'Neill (Setúbal, São Sebastião, 14 March 1881 – Lisbon, Santa Engrácia, 21 December 1905), married José Nunes de Carvalho Noronha, and had issue, an only son:
  - José O'Neill de Carvalho Noronha (Lisbon, Santa Engrácia, 6 December 1904 – Coimbra, São Martinho do Bispo, 23 September 1978), resident of Soure, antifascist activist who was imprisoned, tortured and deported to Timor, married Maria Ermelinda Lopes Soares de Andrade (Figueira da Foz, Buarcos, 26 June 1908 – Coimbra, Soure, 31 December 1990), and had issue.
- Mariana Carolina de Almeida Carvalho O'Neill/Torlades O'Neill (Setúbal, São Sebastião, 1 February 1882 – Setúbal, Anunciada, 1944), married firstly Serafim de Araújo Gouveia and had issue, and married secondly Setúbal, São Sebastião, 12 August 1915 Henrique Afonso Fernandes Bramão (Setúbal, São Sebastião, 8 October 1886 – Setúbal, 30 July 1930), Employee at the Captaincy of the Port (Port authority) of Setúbal, son of Francisco Augusto de Almeida Bramão and second wife Maria Helena Gomes Fernandes, and had issue
- João Carlos Torlades O'Neill (Setúbal, São Sebastião, 29 August 1883 – Setúbal, São Julião, 20 February 1915), married Setúbal, 5 August 1912 Maria Cora da Costa e Silva (Setúbal, Santa Maria da Graça, 13 April 1884 – ?), daughter of José Augusto da Silva and wife Maria Gertrudes da Costa Reis, without issue
- Artur Eduardo Torlades O'Neill (Setúbal, São Sebastião, 1 June 1885 – Setúbal, 5 October 1935), married Umbelina Cacilda da Costa Silva (Setúbal, Santa Maria da Graça, 15 January 1887 – Setúbal, Santa Maria da Graça, 27 March 1960), and had issue, now extinct

== See also ==
- Irish nobility
- Irish kings
- Irish royal families
- O'Neill (surname)
- Uí Néill, the Irish Dynasty
- Ó Neill Dynasty Today
- O'Neill of Clannaboy
