= José Carlos O'Neill =

José Carlos O'Neill (1 August 1815, in Lisbon, Encarnação (registered 1825) – 21 June 1887, in Lisbon, Encarnação), was the titular head of the Clanaboy O'Neill dynasty, whose family has been in Portugal since the 18th century.

== Life ==
He was the first-born son of the previous head José Maria O'Neill and wife Ludovina de Jesus Alves Solano.

He was a trader and the Main Manager of the Casa Comercial Torlades, who also received in his house in his Farm (Quinta) of as Machadas, at the term of Setúbal, Kings Pedro V of Portugal and Luís I of Portugal.

He died unmarried and without issue. He was succeeded by his second brother Jorge Torlades O'Neill I.

== See also ==
- Irish nobility
- Irish kings
- Irish royal families
- O'Neill (surname)
- Uí Néill, the Irish Dynasty
- Ó Neill Dynasty Today
- O'Neill of Clannaboy
