= João O'Neill =

João O'Neill (in Irish Séan Ó Néill, in English Shane or John O'Neill; died 21 January 1788), was the titular head of a branch of the Clanaboy O'Neill dynasty, whose family has been in Portugal since the 18th century.

== Life ==
He was born in the village of Richhill, County Armagh, the first-born son of the previous head Conn Ó Néill and wife Cecilia O'Hanlon.

In 1740, for religious and political motives, he moved to Portugal with his brothers, where he was an important proprietor in the Council of Almada. He also acquired the house and farm of Arealva.

== Marriage and issue ==
He married in Lisbon, São Paulo, on 2 September 1750 to Valentina Maria Josefa Ferreira (Torres Vedras, Carmões, 14 February 1730 - ?), daughter of José Ferreira (Lisbon, São Miguel de Alfama - ?), and wife Maria Ferreira (Torres Vedras, Carmões - ?), and had three children:

- Carlos O'Neill (Lisbon, Santa Catarina, 9 June 1760 - 24 June 1835)
- Cecília O'Neill, Prioress at the Catholic Convent of the Irish Sisters of o Bom Sucesso, in Lisbon
- Ana O'Neill, Prioress at the Catholic Convent of the Irish Sisters of o Bom Sucesso, in Lisbon, following her sister

He died in Santos-o-Velho, Lisbon, on 21 January 1788.

== See also ==
- Irish nobility
- Irish kings
- Irish royal families
- O'Neill (surname)
- Uí Néill, the Irish Dynasty
- Ó Neill Dynasty Today
- O'Neill of Clannaboy
