= Jorge Maria O'Neill =

Portuguese engineer (1908–1988)

Jorge Maria O'Neill (Lisbon, Encarnação, 7 November 1908 – Lisbon, 15 December 1988) was the head of a branch of the Clanaboy O'Neill dynasty, which has resided in Portugal since the 18th century.

== Recognition ==
He was officially recognized by the heraldic societies throughout Europe as titular Prince and Count of Clanaboy, but refused to use the title, preferring instead the style O'Neill of Clannaboy. He was the first son of the previous head Hugo José Jorge O'Neill and wife Dona Júlia Margarida Catarina de Serpa Pimentel de Sousa Coutinho. He was also Viscount of Santa Mónica, in Portugal.

== Life ==
Jorge O'Neill was an Electronic Engineer graduating from the University of Lausanne, Switzerland. He was recognized by the Chief Herald of Ireland as Chief of the Name for the O'Neill of Clannaboy.

== Marriage and issue ==
Jorge Maria O'Neill married in Cascais, on 23 December 1937 Josefina Luísa Roquette Ricciardi (Lisbon, Camões, 5 April 1917 – Lisbon, Alcântara, 11 April 2004), daughter of Luís Rafael Feliciano da Conceição Ricciardi (Note: Paternal descendant of a Noble Italian Family from Aversa.) and wife Julieta Garin Holtreman Roquette. (Note: Of French descent, grand-niece of the 1st Baron of Salvaterra de Magos and maternal granddaughter of Alfredo Augusto das Neves Holtreman, 1st Viscount of Alvalade and Founder of Sporting Clube de Portugal, a descendant of a Noble Family from the Bishopric of Liège.) They had five children:

- Hugo Ricciardi O'Neill (born Lisbon, Encarnação, 7 March 1939)
- Maria Madalena Ricciardi O'Neill (born Lisbon, Alcântara, 13 September 1940), married Chapel of the Quinta das Machadas, São Julião, Setúbal, 7 September 1961 Gonçalo Dinís Pinheiro de Melo (born Cascais, Casa de São Bernardo, 18 November 1931), son of Bernardo Miguel António Pinheiro de Melo (Note: Son of the 1st Counts of Arnoso and paternal grandson of the 1st Viscounts of Pindela.) and wife Maria Luísa Anjos Dinís,{{Of Irish and Scottish descent.}} and had four children
- Teresa Maria Ricciardi O'Neill (born Lisbon, Alcântara, 26 March 1942), married Chapel of the Quinta das Machadas, São Julião, Setúbal, on 16 September 1966 Luís Filipe Mayer da Câmara Pina (born Lisbon, Encarnação, 13 May 1938), son of Luís Maria Portocarrero da Câmara Pina (Note: Licentiate in Mathematics from the Faculty of Mathematics of the University of Coimbra, a General, Chief of Major Staff of the Portuguese Army, Deputy to the Assembly of the Republic, and Diplomat, etc, decorated with the Military Medals of Gold and Silver of Distinguished Services, Grand Cross of Military Merit, of the Order of Aviz and of the Order of Prince Henry (Ordem do Infante Dom Henrique), Commander of the Order of Saint James of the Sword, Officer of the Order of Christ, etc.) and wife Marta Maria de Lima Mayer, (Note: Of Ashkenazi Jewish and Sephardi Jewish paternal descent and also of Irish maternal descent.) and had three children
- Margarida Maria Ricciardi O'Neill (born Lisbon, Alcântara, 18 January 1944), married civilly at the 5th Conservatory of the Civil Registry of Lisbon 18 April 1986 José Lourenço de Sá da Luz Coruche (born Lisbon, São Sebastião da Pedreira, 1 March 1947), son of Fernando Luís Lavin da Luz Coruche< (Note: one of the 2nd Viscounts of Coruche and of the Viscounts of Pereira, a Licentiate in Architecture from the Escola Superior de Belas Artes de Lisboa of the University of Lisbon and an Architect, of French descent living in Spain.) and wife Maria da Assunção de Sá Pereira Coutinho Sotomaior, (Note: Of the Counts (formerly Viscounts and Lords of the Majorat) of a Aurora.) without issue
- Maria Isabel Ricciardi O'Neill (born Lisbon, Alcântara, 23 March 1947), married civilly at the 4th Conservatory of the Civil Registry of Lisbon 6 January 1984 José António de Sampaio de Abreu Valente (born Lisbon, São Jorge de Arroios, 21 April 1952), son of José Luís Alves Dinís de Abreu Valente (Note: Agricultural Engineer.) and wife Maria Antónia de Lima Rosa Coelho de Sampaio, and had issue.

== See also ==
- Irish nobility
- Irish kings
- Irish royal families
- O'Neill (surname)
- Uí Néill, the Irish Dynasty
- Ó Neill Dynasty Today
- O'Neill of Clannaboy
