= Conn Ó Néill =

Conn Ó Néill (sometimes anglicised as Con or Constantine O'Neill) was the titular head of the Clandeboye O'Neill dynasty.

== Life ==
He was born in the Parish of Saint Catherine, Dublin, the only son and successor of the previous Head of the House, Phelim (Felix) O'Neill by his first marriage to Catherine Keating.

He lived in Dublin, County Dublin.

== Marriage and issue ==
He married Cecilia O'Hanlon (Ireland, Leinster, Archbishopric of Dublin, Cashel, daughter of Captain Féilim Ó hAnluain (in English Phelim or Felix O'Hanlon) and wife, and had issue, three sons and six daughters:

- João O'Neill (in Irish Seán Ó Néill, in English Shane or John O'Neill), passed to Portugal with his brothers in 1740 for political and religious motives, married and had issue
- Félix O'Neill (in Irish Féilim Ó Neill, in English Phelim or Felix O'Neill), passed to Portugal with his brothers in 1740 for political and religious motives, married and had issue
- Carlos O'Neill (in Irish Cathal or Séarlas Ó Neill, in English Charles O'Neill), passed to Portugal with his brothers for political and religious motives, married and had issue
- Annabela O'Neill, married to ... Broghil and had issue
- Catherine O'Neill, married to Terence MacMahon and had issue
- Sara O'Neill, unmarried and without issue
- Alice O'Neill (in Irish Ailís Ní Néill), unmarried and without issue
- Anna O'Neill (in Irish Áine Ní Néill), unmarried and without issue
- ... O'Neill, without further notice, possibly died young

== See also ==
- Irish nobility
- Irish kings
- Irish royal families
- O'Neill (surname)
- Uí Néill, the Irish Dynasty
- Ó Neill Dynasty Today
- O'Neill of Clannaboy
