= Hugo José Jorge O'Neill =

Portuguese naval officer (1874–1940)

Hugo José Jorge O'Neill (7 June 1874 in Lisbon, Santos-o-Velho – 30 March 1940 in Palmela) was the head of the O'Neill Clandeboy (Ó Néill Clann Aodha Buidhe) dynasty, which ruled a kingdom in Gaelic Ireland until the early 17th century, and has been in Portugal since the 18th century.

== Recognition ==
He was the first son of the previous head of the family of Jorge Torlades O'Neill II and wife Maria Isabel Mazziotti da Costa Cordeiro Fernandes. He was also the Representative of the title of Viscount of Santa Mónica, in Portugal.

== Life ==
Hugo José Jorge O'Neill was an Officer of the Portuguese Navy and an Officer at the Orders of Kings Carlos I of Portugal and Manuel II of Portugal. He met and corresponded with Roger Casement in 1904 (when Casement was briefly consul general in Lisbon) and then met with the Belfast antiquarian solicitor Francis Joseph Bigger. O'Neill employed an Irish governess for his children.

== Marriage and issue ==
He married in Lisbon, Santos-o-Velho, on 14 February 1906 Dona Júlia Margarida Catarina de Serpa Pimentel de Sousa Coutinho (Lisbon, Lapa, 27 September 1881 – Lisbon, Pena, 28 February 1934), daughter of Dom Fernando de Serpa Leitão de Mansilha Pimentel (Note: Decorated Officer, of the Marquesses (formerly Counts and Viscounts) of Gouveia and Barons of São João de Areias.) and wife Dona Maria Ana Vitória de Sousa Coutinho, (Note: Daughter of the 3rd Count of Linhares, of the Marquesses (formerly Counts) of o Funchal and Marquesses (formerly Viscounts with Grandeess) of Maceió in Brazil, and of the Counts of Redondo (formerly Counts of Borba) and Lords of Gouveia, maternal granddaughter of Nuno José Severo de Mendoça Rolim de Moura Barreto, 1st Duke of Loulé and Infanta Ana de Jesus Maria of Portugal.) and had four children:

- Maria Ana do Carmo O'Neill (Cascais, 30 July 1907 – ?), married Lisbon, Encarnação, 3 January 1929 her co-brother-in-law Dr. Dom João José de Melo (Cascais, 9 September 1904 – ?), son of Dom António Vasco de Melo da Silva César de Menezes, 10th Count of Sabugosa and 12th Count of São Lourenço and representative of the title of Marquess of Sabugosa, and wife Berta Munró dos Anjos, (Note: Of Scottish descent on her mother's side.) and had three children
- Jorge Maria O'Neill (Lisbon, Encarnação, 7 November 1908 – Lisbon, 15 December 1988)
- Maria Isabel de Jesus O'Neill (Lisbon, Encarnação, 27 May 1910 – ?), married Lisbon, Encarnação, 11 April 1929 her co-brother-in-law Dom António Vasco José de Melo da Silva César de Menezes, 4th Marquess and 11th Count of Sabugosa and 13th Count of São Lourenço (Cascais, 28 September 1903 – ?), son of Dom António Vasco de Melo da Silva César de Menezes, 10th Count of Sabugosa and 12th Count of São Lourenço and representative of the title of Marquess of Sabugosa, and wife Berta Munró dos Anjos, (Note: Of Scottish descent on her mother's side.) and had five children
- Fernando Hugo Maria O'Neill (Lisbon, Encarnação, 13 October 1914 – Setúbal, 17 October 1974), Civil Engineer from the Instituto Superior Técnico of the University of Lisbon, married Lisbon, Santos-o-Velho, 6 October 1947 Maria Lívia Rita da Graça de Sá Pais do Amaral Franco (born Lisbon, Santos-o-Velho, 19 March 1923), daughter of Dr. Frederico Gaspar Schindler Franco Castelo-Branco (Note: Son of João Franco Ferreira Pinto Castelo-Branco and of German Swiss and Swiss Italian descent on his mother's side.) and wife Maria Rita de Sá Pais do Amaral, (Note: Daughter of the 5th Count (formerly Viscounts) of Anadia and 13th Lord of the Manor of Mangualde, of the Viscounts of Alverca and Counts (formerly Viscounts) of Alferrarede.) and had four children:
  - Rita Maria Franco O'Neill (born Lisbon, Encarnação, 9 January 1950 – Madrid, 9 October 1977), After receiving a diploma from the Instituto Superior de Línguas e Administração of the University of Lisbon, married Lisbon, Prazeres, 27 March 1971 Dom Sebastião Maria de Sá Coutinho de Lancastre (born Lisbon, 13 June 1945), son of Dom Sebastião de Oliveira e Almeida Calheiros de Lancastre (Note: Of the Counts of a Guarda and of the Counts (formerly Lords) of as Alcáçovas and Counts of Cuba, and also of the Marquesses (formerly Counts) of Castelo Melhor and Counts of a Calheta.) and wife Maria Angelina de Sá Coutinho Rebelo Sotomaior, (Note: Daughter of the 3rd Count (formerly Viscounts and Lords of the Majorat) of a Aurora.) without issue
  - João Hugo Maria Franco O'Neill (born Lisbon, Encarnação, 2 April 1951), Agricultural Engineer by the Instituto Superior de Agronomia, married Oeiras, Caxias, 29 September 1975 Maria da Graça de Castelo-Branco Schedel (born Lisbon, São Sebastião da Pedreira, 15 August 1952), daughter of João Ferrão de Castelo-Branco Schedel (Note: Born to a German father.) and wife Dona Maria Isabel da Visitação de Siqueira de Castelo-Branco, (Note: Of the Marquesses (formerly Lords of the Majorat) of Belas, Counts and Lords of the Majorat) of Pombeiro and Viscounts and Lords of the Majorat) of Castelo-Branco, and of the Counts of a Figueira, and also of the Marquesses (formerly Counts) of Castelo Melhor and Counts of a Calheta.) and had two children:
    - Vera Schedel O'Neill (born Lisbon, Alvalade, 21 March 1976), married Lisbon, Prazeres, 13 December 1997 Manuel de Atouguia Belford Correia da Silva (born Angola, 16 July 1973), son of Pedro de Barros Belford Correia da Silva (Note: Of the Counts (formerly Viscounts) of Paço de Arcos, of remote English ancestry.) and first wife (as her first husband and divorced) Margarida Maria de Castro de Atouguia, (Note: Of the Viscounts of Atouguia.) and had one son
    - Duarte Schedel O'Neill (born Lisbon, Alvalade, 7 May 1979), Licentiate in Journalism from the Faculty of Letters of the University of Lisbon
  - Maria Ana Franco O'Neill (born Lisbon, Encarnação, 26 June 1952), Licentiate in Mathematics from the University of Lisbon, married Lisbon, Prazeres, 26 October 1973 as his first wife Dr. Dom Manuel José de Gouveia Portela de Herédia (born Lisbon, Campo Grande, 3 July 1948), Licentiate in Law from the University of Lisbon, Lawyer, son of Dom José de Freitas Branco de Herédia (Note: Of the Viscounts of a Ribeira Brava.) and first wife (divorced) Maria do Carmo de Gouveia Portela, and had three children
  - José Maria Franco O'Neill (born Lisbon, Santos-o-Velho, 2 July 1954), Licentiate in Organization and Managing of Businesses from the Instituto Superior de Ciências do Trabalho e da Empresa of the University of Lisbon, married Lisbon, Prazeres, 3 March 1990 Cecília Maria de Bragança Mendes (born Lisbon, São Domingos de Benfica, 16 September 1967), daughter of Dr. José dos Reis Mendes, Licentiate in Medicine from the Faculty of Medicine of the University of Coimbra, and wife Dona Leonor de Bragança, (Note: Daughter of the 5th and sister of the 6th Dukes of Lafões, representatives of Duke of Miranda do Corvo, etc), of the Dukes of Lafões, Dukes (formerly Counts) of Miranda do Corvo, Marquesses of Arronches and Lords of the House of Sousa, Marquesses of Marialva, Counts of Cantanhede, and of the Marquesses of Valença, Marquesses (formerly Counts of Aguiar and Counts of Vimioso, great-great-granddaughter of Dom José Bernardino de Portugal e Castro, 5th Marquess of Valença, 12th Count of Vimioso, 27th Prime Minister of Portugal) and had two children:
    - Rodrigo Maria de Bragança Mendes O'Neill (born Lisbon, Prazeres, 17 February 1993)
    - Rita Maria dos Reis de Bragança Mendes O'Neill (born Lisbon, Prazeres, 5 January 1996)

== See also ==
- Irish nobility
- Irish kings
- Irish royal families
- O'Neill (surname)
- Uí Néill, the Irish Dynasty
- O'Neill Dynasty § Today
- O'Neill of Clannaboy
