= Jorge Torlades O'Neill I =

Portuguese-Irish chieftain (?-1890)

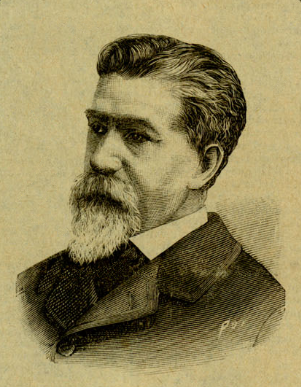
Jorge O'Neill

Jorge Torlades O'Neill (15 December 1817 (registered 1825), in Lisbon, Encarnação – 18 November 1890), was the titular head of the Clanaboy O'Neill dynasty, whose family has been in Portugal since the 18th century.

== Family ==
He was the second son who became the successor of the previous head José Maria O'Neill and wife Ludovina de Jesus Alves Solano, succeeding his older brother José Carlos O'Neill, who died unmarried and without issue. He was also the representative of the title of Viscount of Santa Mónica, in Portugal, after the death of his younger brother Henrique O'Neill, 1st Viscount of Santa Mónica unmarried and without issue.

== Life ==
He was the Main Manager of the Casa Comercial Torlades, Consul-General of Denmark, Belgium and Greece in Lisbon, Knight and Commander of the Order of Christ, and Knight and Commander of the Order of Our Lady of the Concepcion of Vila Viçosa, Commander of the Order of the Dannebrog of Denmark, Officer of the Order of Leopold of Belgium and of the Order of the Redeemer of Greece, Knight of the Order of the Rose of Brazil, etc., and a personal friend of King Ferdinand II of Portugal. He met Hans Christian Andersen during his visit to Portugal.

== Marriage and issue ==
He married in Lisbon, Encarnação, on 20 June 1846 his first cousin Carolina Teresa O'Neill (Porto, Vitória, 5 January 1822 - Lisbon, 11 November 1893/1913), daughter of Joaquim Maria Torlades O'Neill and wife Joana Carolina de Brito e Cunha, and had two sons:

- Jorge Torlades O'Neill II (Lisbon, Encarnação, 15 February 1849 - 11 February 1925)
- Artur Torlades O'Neill (Lisbon, São Sebastião da Pedreira, 15 December 1851 - 9 November 1880), married Maria da Glória de Brito de Carvalho Gorjão, daughter of Francisco Gorjão and wife ... de Brito de Carvalho, without issue

== See also ==
- Irish nobility
- Irish kings
- Irish royal families
- O'Neill (surname)
- Uí Néill, the Irish Dynasty
- Ó Neill Dynasty Today
- O'Neill of Clannaboy
