= Henrique O'Neill, 1st Viscount of Santa Mónica =

Portuguese noble, politician

Henrique O'Neill
- 1st Viscount of Santa Mónica
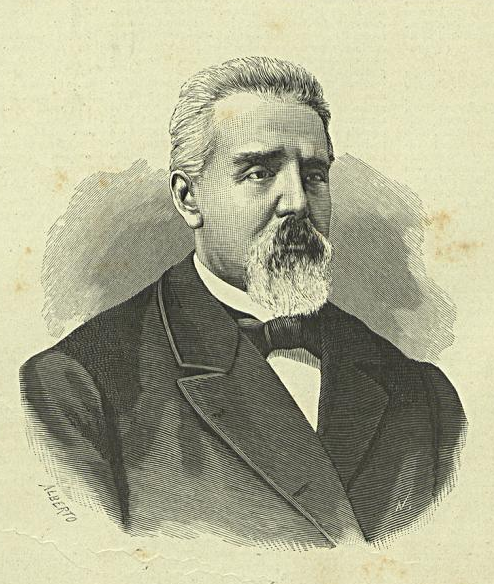
- Born: 3 August 1823; Lisbon, Portugal
- Died: 6 November 1889 (aged 66); Lisbon, Portugal

Henrique O'Neill, 1st Viscount of Santa Mónica (3 August 1823 – 6 November 1889) was a Portuguese writer, jurist and politician.

== Background ==
Henrique O'Neill was born on 3 August 1823 in Lisbon. He was a son of José Maria O'Neill, the titular head of the Clanaboy O'Neill dynasty, whose family has been in Portugal since the 18th century, and wife Ludovina de Jesus Alves Solano. He descended from an Irish noble family that had fled to France in the 17th century due to religious persecution and which then passed to Portugal.

== Career ==
A bachelor in law from the University of Coimbra, he left to go to Germany soon after his graduation and there he lectured on Portuguese language at the University of Göttingen. Invited by the Minister Martins Ferrão, then Minister of Justice, to come and lead one of the branches of his Ministry, he returned to Portugal, where he initiated his career as functionary which rapidly took him to Director-General of Justice, Honorary Director-General of Justice Affairs, Honorary Veador (Overseer) of Queen Maria Pia of Savoy and Preceptor of then Prince Dom Carlos and his brother the Infante Dom Afonso (Alvará of 23 October 1873, becoming integrated in the list of the residents of the Royal Household), with the title of Officer-Major of the Royal Household. He was also Prosecutor-General of the Crown and Treasury and Overseer of Queen Dona Maria Pia.

== Other works ==
He was a very distinguished and literate person, who socialized with Alexandre Herculano, António Feliciano de Castilho and other worthies of the time, reached a position of a certain relief in Letters since he was a student, when he published poems in the Trovador, to which group he belonged. He translated and adapted the Fables of Lessing and published Fabulário, In Memoriam, Feira da Ladra, and the Turra de Dois Caturras, all in out of the market editions.

== Title, honours and decorations ==
He was a member of His Most Faithful Majesty's Council, 309th Grand Cross of the Royal Order of Our Lady of Concepcion of Vila Viçosa, of Portugal, also Grand Cross of the Imperial Order of the Rose, of Brazil, and of the Royal Order of the Crown, of Italy, Commander of the Legion of Honour, of France, etc., associate of the Academia Real das Ciências de Lisboa and the Instituto de Coimbra. His title of 1st Viscount of Santa Monica was conceded to him by decree dated 28 December 1876 of King Luís I of Portugal. He used the arms of O'Neill plene.

== Personal life ==
He died unmarried and without issue. The representation of his title went to his older surviving brother Jorge Torlades O'Neill I.

== See also ==
- Irish kings
- Irish nobility
- Irish royal families
- O'Neill of Clannaboy
- Ó Neill Dynasty Today
- Uí Néill, the Irish Dynasty

== Sources ==
- Nobreza de Portugal e do Brasil, Volume Terceiro, p. 299
