= O'Neill (disambiguation) =

The O'Neill dynasty is a lineage of Irish Gaelic origin.

O'Neill, Ó Néill, O'Neil, O'Neal, or Uí Néill may also refer to:

== People ==
=== Surnames ===
- Uí Néill, for information on the Ui Neill dynasty
- O'Neill (surname), including surname origins and information
  - List of people with the surname O'Neill, including O'Neal, O'Neil, and other variations
- The O'Neill Brothers, an American instrumental duo

=== Noble titles ===
- Baron O'Neill, a title in the Peerage of the United Kingdom
- O'Neill baronets, two in the Baronetage of Ireland, and one in the Baronetage of the United Kingdom
- Viscount O'Neill, a title in the Peerage of Ireland

== Places ==
=== Australia ===
- O'Neill's Adventureland, an amusement park in Edmondson Park, New South Wales

=== Canada ===
- Archbishop M.C. O'Neill High School, Regina, Saskatchewan
- O'Neill Collegiate and Vocational Institute, Oshawa, Ontario

=== United States ===
- O'Neal Island, San Juan Islands of Washington
- Buckey O'Neill Cabin, a cabin
- Eugene O'Neill National Historic Site, Danville, California
- Eugene O'Neill Theater Center, a not-for-profit theater company in Connecticut
- Eugene O'Neill Theatre, a Broadway theatre
- O'Neill, Nebraska, a city
- O'Neill Building, a landmarked former department store in New York City
- O'Neill Center, an athletic complex at Western Connecticut State University
- O'Neill Dam, San Luis Creek west of Los Banos, California
- O'Neill House Office Building, Washington, D.C.
- O'Neill House Office Building (1947), Washington, D.C.; demolished in 2002
- O'Neill Forebay, San Luis Reservoir west of Los Banos, California
- O'Neill Tunnel, Boston, Massachusetts
- Thomas P. O'Neill Jr. Federal Building (Boston), Massachusetts

== Fiction ==
- The O'Neill, a 1912 American silent film
- April O'Neil, a character in the Teenage Mutant Ninja Turtles franchise
- Danny O'Neil a character from the 1988 movie 14 Going on 30
- Elwood O'Neil, a supporting character and antagonist in Grand Theft Auto V
- Jack O'Neill, a character in the 1989 American action comedy movie Speed Zone
- Jack O'Neill, a character in the Stargate franchise
- Tim O'Neill, a character in the television series seaQuest DSV
- The Trials of Rosie O'Neill, a 1990s American television series

== Companies and organizations ==
- O'Neill (brand), a surfwear and equipment brand that was started in San Francisco, California
- O'Neill Sea Odyssey, a non-profit organization in Santa Cruz, California
- O'Neills, an Irish sportswear company
- Sandler O'Neill and Partners, a New York City-based investment banking firm
- O'Neal Steel, Inc., an American metal company

== Law ==
- Dennis O'Neill case, a Welsh child abuse and manslaughter case
- O'Neill v Phillips, a UK company law case on an action for unfair prejudice
- Sheff v. O'Neill, a Connecticut Supreme Court case regarding civil rights and the right to education

== Other ==
- Eugene O'Neill Award, a Swedish award for stage actors
- O'Neill World Cup of Surfing, an annual event at Sunset Beach in Hawaii
- O'Neill Sebastian Inlet Pro, a surfing event in Florida
- Tip O'Neill Award, an award given out by the Canadian Baseball Hall of Fame
- O'Neill ministry, in the Parliament of Northern Ireland 1963–1969
- O'Neill cylinder, a proposed style of space habitat
- USS O'Neill (DE-188), a Cannon-class destroyer escort in the United States Navy

== See also ==
- Justice O'Neill (disambiguation)
