= P. O'Neill =

P. O'Neill may refer to:

- A pseudonym used by the Provisional Irish Republican Army
- P. K. O'Neill, a politician in Nevada, United States

== See also ==
- List of people with surname O'Neill § P
