= Con O'Neill =

Con O'Neill or Conn O'Neill may refer to:

== Irish noblemen ==
- Conn O'Neill (d. 1482), lord of Clandeboye in medieval Ireland
- Conn O'Neill, 1st Earl of Tyrone (c. 1480–1559), King of Tír Eóghain
- Conn O'Neill (died 1601), Irish soldier
- Conn O'Neill (prisoner), seventeenth century Irish aristocrat
- Conn Ó Néill, head of the Clandeboye O'Neill dynasty

== Other ==
- Con O'Neill (actor) (born 1966), British actor
- Con O'Neill (diplomat) (1912–1988), British diplomat
