= Edward O'Neill =

Edward O'Neill, O'Neil or O'Neal may refer to:

== Politicians ==
- Edward O'Neill, 2nd Baron O'Neill (1839–1928), Irish peer and Conservative politician
- Edward O'Neill (Wisconsin politician) (1820–1890), mayor of Milwaukee, Wisconsin
- Edward J. O'Neill (Rhode Island politician), Rhode Island state senator
- Edward L. O'Neill (1903–1948), American politician in New Jersey

== Sportsmen ==
- Ed O'Neil (Edward William O'Neil, born 1952), former American football coach and NFL linebacker
- Ed O'Neil (baseball) (Edward J. O'Neil, 1859–1892), Major League Baseball pitcher

== Military ==
- Edward A. O'Neal (1818–1890), Confederate general during the American Civil War
- Edward J. O'Neill (general) (1902–1979), U.S. military officer during World War II

== Others ==
- Ed O'Neill (born 1946), American actor and comedian
- Ed O'Neal, American gospel singer
- Edward O'Neill (actor) (1862–1938), British actor
- Edward Frances O'Neill (1890–1975), known as Teddy O'Neill, English teacher

== See also ==
- O'Neill (disambiguation)
