= Alexandre O'Neill =

Portuguese writer and poet (1924–1986)

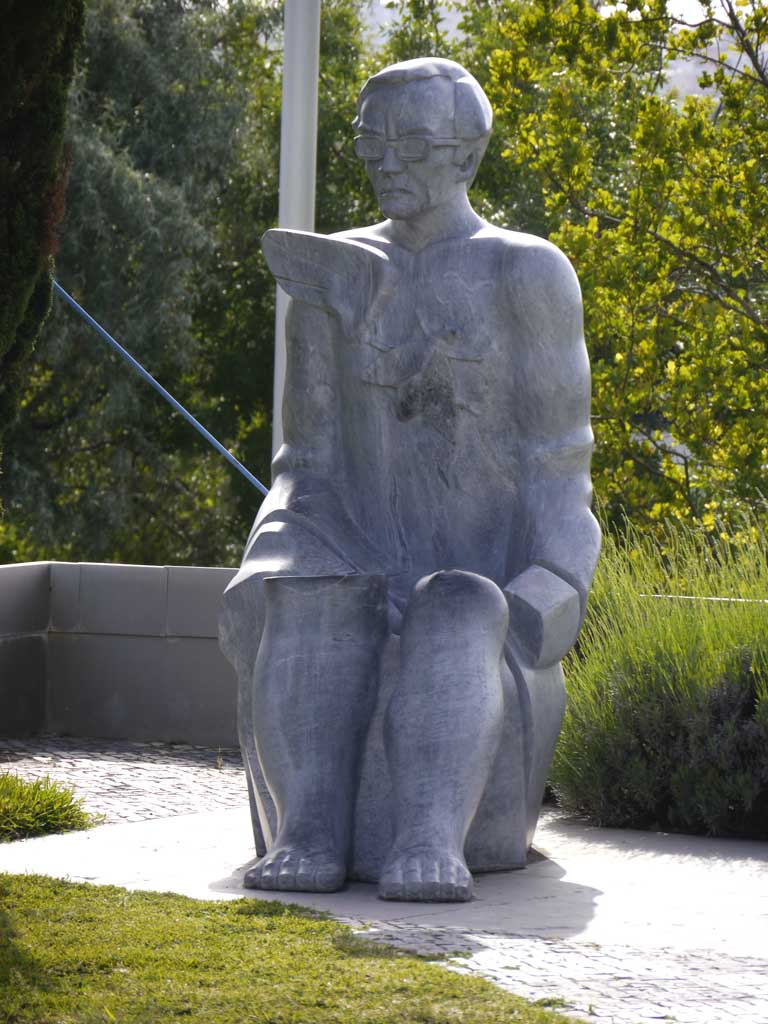
- Statue of Alexandre O'Neill
- Born: Alexandre Manuel Vahia de Castro O'Neill de Bulhões; 19 December 1924; Lisbon, Portugal
- Died: 21 August 1986 (aged 61); Lisbon, Portugal
- Occupations: Writer; poet; publicist
- Spouses: Noémia Delgado (m. 1957; div. 1971); Teresa Patrício de Gouveia (m. 1971; div. 1981)
- Children: 2, including Alexandre Delgado O'Neill and Afonso de Gouveia O'Neill
- Writing career
- Language: Portuguese
- Genres: Poetry; concrete poetry; surrealism
- Notable works: Portugal, St. Francis's Empty Sandal, Lament of the Man Who Misses Being Blind
- Notable awards: Grand Officer of the Order of Saint James of the Sword
- Literary movement: Surrealism; concretism

Alexandre Manuel Vahia de Castro O'Neill de Bulhões, GOSE (19 December 1924 – 21 August 1986) was a Portuguese writer and poet of Irish descent.

== Early life and family ==
O'Neill was born at 39 Fontes Pereira de Melo Avenue in Lisbon. He was the son of José António Pereira de Eça O'Neill (Lisbon, c. 1890 – ?), a bank worker, and wife Maria da Glória Vahia de Barros de Castro (17 March 1905 – aft. October 1989), and paternal grandson of writer, poet, conferencewoman and journalist Maria O'Neill. His ancestor João O'Neill (Irish: Seán Ó Néill) had emigrated from Ireland in 1740.

He had an older sister, Maria Amélia Vahia de Castro O'Neill de Bulhões, who became a Nun.

== Career ==
He was a self-taught person and worked as a publicity professional.

Surrealist and concretist poet and writer, and a publicist, who collaborated in many periodicals.

In 1948, O'Neill was among the founders of the Lisbon Surrealist Movement, along with Mário Cesariny de Vasconcelos, José-Augusto França and others. His writings soon diverged from Surrealist to form an original style whose poetry reflects a love/hate relationship with his country.

His work is characterized by a tendency to challenge social and literary conventions, a recurring critical stance, experimentation with language, and the use of parody and dark humor. These elements contribute to a body of writing that offers pointed reflections on Portuguese identity and its relationship to the nation.

Although most of his works have been lost or are missing or in private collections some of his work was displayed in 2002 at an exhibit on the Surrealist movement.

O'Neill was in permanent conflict with Portugal. While other contemporaries wrote poems that protested against national life under Salazar, O'Neill's attack ran deeper. Poems such as Standing at Fearful Attention and Portugal suggested that the dictatorial regime was a symptom (the worst symptom) of graver ills – lack of courage and smallness of vision – woven into the nation's psyche. Other poems, such as Lament of the Man Who Misses Being Blind, seemed to hold religion and mysticism responsible for an obscurantism that made change difficult if not impossible.

O'Neill was a publicist by profession, who was known for creating advertising slogans. O'Neill's poetry was anti-Romantic, writing about the place of humanity in the natural world. In his poem, St. Francis's Empty Sandal, his one hope was stated to be the connection (never entirely peaceful) he felt with other members of the species.

== Decorations ==
He was awarded the degree of Grand Officer of the Order of Saint James of the Sword.

== Marriages and children ==
He married firstly on 27 December 1957 and divorced on 15 January 1971 television and film screenwriter, editor and director Noémia Delgado. The couple had a son:

- Alexandre Delgado O'Neill (Lisbon, 23 December 1959 – Lisbon, Portugal, 4 January 1993), a photographer, unmarried and without issue

He married secondly in Lisbon on 4 August 1971 and divorced on 20 February 1981 politician Teresa Patrício de Gouveia. The couple had a son:

- Afonso de Gouveia O'Neill (born 28 May 1976), unmarried and without issue

== Death ==
O'Neill died on 21 August 1986 in Lisbon.

== Filmography ==
- Las Hurdes aka Las Hurdes, tierra sin pan (Spain: long title) or Tierra sin pan (Spain: short title) or Land Without Bread (International: English title) (1933) .... Himself – Voice
- Dom Roberto (1962) Author of Poems
- Pássaros de Asas Cortadas aka Birds with Clipped Wings (International: English title) (1963) Author of the Dialogue
- Sete Balas Para Selma (1967) Author of Poem
- Águas Vivas (1969) .... Narrator and also Film writer
- A Grande Roda (1970) Film writer
- Sever do Vouga... Uma Experiência (1971) .... Narrator
- Schweik na Segunda Guerra Mundial (1975) (TV) Author of Poems
- Cantigamente (3 episodes, "#1.1", "#1.2" and "#1.3", 1976) Television writer
- Máscaras (1976) .... Narrator
- Nós por cá Todos Bem (1978) Author of Poem "Coro das Criadas de Servir"
- Ninguém (1979) (TV) Television writer
- Lisboa (1979) (TV) Television writer
- Prata da Casa (unknown episodes, 1980) .... Himself as Jury Member
