= Joseph O'Neill =

Joseph O'Neill or O'Neil may refer to:

- Joseph O'Neill (writer, born 1964), Irish-born novelist and author of Netherland
- Joseph O'Neill (writer, born 1886) (1886–1953), Irish novelist
- Joseph O'Neill (politician), Irish politician, member of the 14th Seanad
- Joseph P. O'Neill (born 1947), American Democratic Party strategist in Washington, D.C.
- Joe O'Neill (born 1982), English footballer
- Joseph H. O'Neil (1853–1935), U.S. Representative
- Joseph P. O'Neil (1863-1938), U.S. Army general
- Joseph T. O'Neill (1931-2022), American lawyer and politician

== See also ==
- Joseph T. O'Neal (1881–1944), American politician; mayor of Louisville, Kentucky
