= Jacob Frederico Torlade =

- Born: Jacob Friedrich Torlade; Hamburg, Germany
- Other names: Jacob Torlades
- Occupations: Businessman and banker
- Spouse: Maria Inácia Gonçalves
- Relatives: Jacob Frederico Torlade Pereira de Azambuja

Jacob Frederico Torlade (in German Jacob Friedrich Torlade) (his surname went on to use the spelling Torlades), was a Portuguese businessman who originally from Hamburg (and naturalized Portuguese on 23 July 1781). He was a son of Heinrich Torlade, businessman and Elisabeth Torlade, both born and living in Hamburg. His descendants included Jacob Frederico Torlade Pereira de Azambuja.

== Career ==
He was a businessman and a banker, connected to sea trading, Consul of the Hanseatic League Cities in Setúbal, founder and main manager of the Casa Comercial Torlades, Lord, by purchase, of the farm (quinta) of Machadas, in the parish of São Julião, term of Setúbal in 1815 to Botelho de Moraes Sarmento family (the oldest residential area, designated by Machadas de Baixo, which goes back to the 17th century).

On 25 May 1825, the farm was visited by King John VI of Portugal, accompanied by the Infanta Isabel Maria of Portugal and the Infanta Maria da Assunção of Portugal, and by the Court, being received and hosted by its proprietor, the below mentioned Carlos O'Neill, who had inherited the farm by marriage, with the crest of the O'Neill family placed over the door of the western front.

== Marriage ==
He married Maria Inácia Gonçalves (baptized in Setúbal, São Sebastião, on 9 April 1728), daughter of Pedro Gonçalves (baptized in Alcácer do Sal, Santa Maria do Castelo, on 10 August 1688) and wife (married in Setúbal, São Sebastião, on 13 January 1715) Antónia Baptista Ramos (baptized in Setúbal, São Sebastião, on 12 July 1694), and had issue.

== Descendants ==
His daughter Ana João Torlade (Palmela, Santa Maria (baptized in Palmela, Santa Maria, on 4 November 1758) –) married in Lisbon, Sacramento, on 17 September 1784 to the above-mentioned Carlos O'Neill (Lisbon, Santa Catarina, 9 June 1760 – 24 June 1835), the titular head of the Clanaboy O'Neill dynasty, whose family has been in Portugal since the 18th century, and had issue, nine children.

Ana João Torlade was the maternal aunt, nominately, of Jacob Frederico Torlade Pereira de Azambuja.
