= Jeffrey O'Neill =

Jeffrey O'Neill may refer to:

- Jeff O'Neill (born 1976), Canadian ice hockey player
- Jeffrey O'Neill, a fictional character of the soap opera Guiding Light

== See also ==
- Jeffrey Hamet O'Neal, portrait painter
- O'Neill (surname)
