= Patrick O'Neill =

Patrick O'Neill or Patrick O'Neil may refer to:

- Patrick O'Neill, 1st Count of Tyrone, 17th century soldier and 1st Count of Tyrone
- Patrick O'Neill (politician) (1875–1938), Irish politician and hotel proprietor
- Patrick O'Neill (psychologist) (1942–2021), Canadian psychologist
- Patrick Geoffrey O'Neill (1924–2012), British academic and writer
- Patrick O'Neill (handballer) (born 1956), American handball player
- Patrick O'Neil (1942–2019), American computer scientist
- Patrick O'Neil (footballer) (born 1992), Scottish footballer
- J. Patrick O'Neill (born 1971), Rhode Island state representative
- Patrick O'Neill (bishop), Irish Roman Catholic bishop
- Patrick O'Neill (activist), American Catholic peace activist, one of the Kings Bay Plowshares Seven

== See also ==
- Pat O'Neill (disambiguation)
- Patrick O'Neal (disambiguation)
