= Land Under England =

Land Under England is a 1935 novel written by Joseph O'Neill.

It is included as Number 49 in Fantasy: The 100 Best Books.

== Plot summary ==
Land Under England is a novel in which Anthony Julian is the main character.

== Reception ==
Wendy Graham reviewed Land Under England for Adventurer magazine and stated that "The cover blurb says that this is a work of extraordinary power. The only power it had for me was to bore me, as the hero Anthony Julian thrashes on and on about his anguish and torment. I mean, there is a good tale under it all, but I found that I could read one paragraph per page and still follow it all perfectly. Read the foreword to the book in the bookshop, it gives the whole story in a couple of pages anyway."

== Reviews ==
- Review by C. A. Brandt (1936) in Amazing Stories, April 1936
- Review by Joseph H. Crawford Jr. and James J. Donahue and Donald M. Grant (1953) in '333': A Bibliography of the Science-Fantasy Novel
- Review by Arthur D. Weir [as by Arthur R. Weir] (1960) in Vector 6
- Review by Phil Stephensen-Payne [as by Philip Stephensen-Payne] (1978) in Paperback Parlour, February 1978
- Review by Baird Searles (1981) in Isaac Asimov's Science Fiction Magazine, November 23, 1981
- Review by Arthur O. Lewis (1982) in Science Fiction & Fantasy Book Review, #2, March 1982
- Review by Karl Edward Wagner (1983) in Rod Serling's The Twilight Zone Magazine, July–August 1983
- Review by Lee Montgomerie (1987) in Interzone, Autumn 1987
- Review by James Cawthorn and Michael Moorcock (1988) in Fantasy: The 100 Best Books
