= Count of Tyrone =

The title of Count of Tyrone has been used by two European branches of the O'Neill family to claim affiliation with the O'Neill Earls of Tyrone in the Peerage of Ireland. Romance languages, such as French, Spanish, and Portuguese, do not distinguish between earls and counts, but use the same word for both; when these titles have been translated into English, they are generally rendered Count.

== Earls of Tyrone ==
The O'Neill dynasty descends from Niall Glundub, High King of Ireland in the tenth century; since the twelfth century, their rulers, whom the English called "the O'Neill", have been chosen from two families: the O'Neills of Antrim, descended from Aodh Meth ("Aodh the Fat"), King of Ailech from 1196 to 1230, and the O'Neills of Tyrone (including the Earls of Tyrone), descended from his brother, Niall the Red.

The family of Aodh Meth take their name from Aodh Buidhe ("Aodh the Yellow"), Aodh Meth's grandson, the last King at Ailech from 1263 to 1283; they settled and named Clanaboy or Clandeboye in Antrim. The two branches deposed each other from the leadership of the O'Neills, which was in effect the lordship of Ulster, quite often until 1345; after that, all of the princes of the O'Neills but one were from Tyrone, the head of which came to known as the Great O'Neill (Ua Neill Mor); the exception was Art mac Aodha, prince from 1509 to 1513, who was of the Clann Aedh Buidhe but whose mother was an O'Neill of Tyrone, daughter of The O'Neill. He was succeeded in turn by two sons of Conn Mor O'Neill, his cousin of the Tyrone branch.

When Henry VIII of England had himself declared King of Ireland (rather than Lord of Ireland, as his predecessors had been) he persuaded many of the Irish princes to surrender their Celtic lordships, and accept titles in the Peerage of Ireland instead. In exchange for their allegiance, they received the King's protection from their neighbours and his support in dealing with their fellow-clansmen. This also meant that their clans came under Anglo-Irish law, which made the new peers owners of the land, and their clansmen their tenants; the descent of the new peerages were also regulated by patents issued by the Crown (and so pass to their own descendants), not by the elections under brehon law.

The princes of the Cenell Eoghain had been elected for three centuries from two families named O'Neill, who were distant cousins; they were called "the O'Neill". In 1542, the O'Neill was Conn Bacach O'Neill, younger son of Conn Mor O'Neill in Tyrone; he resigned the position of the O'Neill, and accepted the Earldom of Tyrone; by the patent, his successor was to be his eldest, but illegitimate, son Ferdoragh, who took the name of Matthew, and Matthew's heirs male.

This did not work out well for the O'Neills. Many of them resisted the new laws, and elected Conn Bacach's younger son, Shane O'Neill ("Shane the Proud"), to be The O'Neill in his father's place; the resulting civil war lasted several decades. Matthew was killed, Conn Bacach was driven out of Tyrone, Matthew's eldest son was assassinated. In 1585, Queen Elizabeth confirmed Matthew's second son, Hugh O'Neill as Earl of Tyrone; in 1593, he was chosen to be the O'Neill (replacing Shane's tanist, Turlough Luineach O'Neill, his second cousin) despite Elizabeth's policy that all such principalities be abolished. He attempted to exercise both powers at the same time; his neighbours quarrelled with him, and the Irish Government waged war against him for nine years, one of the many fronts in Elizabeth's desultory war with Spain. His forces exacted tribute from much of Ireland, but he could not take all the country.

James I made peace with Spain after his accession in 1603; he also reconciled with Earl Hugh. But grievances arose again, and (rather than a renewed war without support) the Earl of Tyrone left for Spanish territory to ask for help, taking his family and his closest allies with him, in 1607. He was attainted the next year; in 1614, this was confirmed by the Irish Parliament; his title and lands were forfeit. This Flight of the Earls was the legal basis, therefore, for the Plantation of Ulster by the Scots; since Earl Hugh had personally owned much of Ulster, it was now in the King's hands, to give away as he pleased.

The Earldom of Tyrone was created twice more for prominent Anglo-Irish families, who owned land in the far south of Ireland; it is now a subordinate title of the Marquess of Waterford.

=== Exiles ===
Earl Hugh continued to use his title abroad, and it was recognized by Spain and the Vatican. He died in Rome, in 1616; the life in the seventeenth century had already killed several of his sons, and the others died young. His last surviving son, Shane O'Neill continued to call himself Earl of Tyrone, and to organize raids against Stuart Ireland, until his death in January 1641; his will, written before he went to command his regiment (the Tyrone regiment) in the Spanish siege of Barcelona, then held by the French and the Catalans in the Catalan Revolt, largely deals with the descent of the title and the family estates in Ireland.

Shane O'Neill wished the estates and title to descend :

- First to his only son Hugo Eugenio O'Neill, then nine years old, conceived illegitimately with Isabella O'Donnell, sister of the chief of the O'Donnells in exile (and his heirs, if any)
- Then to his legitimate cousin, Conn O'Neill, Major in the same regiment, son of Earl Hugh's brother Sir Cormac O'Neill (and heirs)
- Then to the descendants of his illegitimate uncle, Art MacBaron O'Neill, so called as natural son of Shane O'Neill's grandfather Matthew O'Neill, who was Baron of Dungannon as well as heir to Tyrone; Art mac Baron's younger son was Owen Roe O'Neill, later a general in Confederate Ireland.
- Lastly to the closest relative to his family among the descendants of his great-uncle Shane the Proud.

Of these men only Major Conn O'Neill was an heir to the forfeit Earldom of Tyrone, and the legitimacy of his father has been disputed.

As it happened, Hugo Eugenio, legitimated after his father's death by Philip IV of Spain, died childless about the age of 29 in 1660, but he outlived his cousins Conn and Owen Roe O'Neill; four of the other descendants of Art mac Baron called themselves Earl of Tyrone, and claimed the colonelcy of the Tyrone regiment. The last succession was disputed: Art mac Baron's daughter married a grandson of Shane the Proud, and their son (another Conn O'Neill) claimed the King of Spain's recognition in 1682; but the Spanish court acknowledged another Eugenio, Art mac Baron's great-grandson, who died a minor in the 1690s.

== O'Neills of Portugal ==
The O'Neills of Clanaboy in Antrim, the other branch of O'Neill princes, continued to live in Antrim after the Flight of the Earls; they received no English title higher than knighthood.

In 1740, the chief of the Clanaboy O'Neills, and his brothers, settled in Portugal, and the family became Portuguese peers. The chief in 1896, Jorge O'Neill, was interested in his Gaelic heritage; in that year, he wrote to the Ulster King of Arms and the Somerset Herald submitting proofs of his distant cousinhood to the Earls of Tyrone, and the Somerset Herald acknowledged his representation of the "Royal House of O'Neill", and registered his arms as those of O'Neill of Clanaboy. This collateral descent, however, does not give any claim to the Earlship of Tyrone.

Jorge O'Neill then began to use the title of Count (conde) of Tyrone; the King of Portugal offered to grant him a Portuguese countship of that style, and he declined. His title was recognized by the Pope and by the Registrar of Portuguese Nobility, which thereby acknowledged him as a former sovereign prince.

The heads of that family since 1901 have been:

- Jorge O'Neill, (1848–1925); succeeded his father as head in 1890; patron of the Irish Volunteers in 1914.
- Hugo José Jorge O'Neill, (1874–1940), eldest son.
- Jorge Maria O'Neill, (1908–1992), eldest son.
- Hugo Ricciardi O'Neill, (b. 1939), eldest son; chooses to be "O'Neill of Clanaboy", as a Gaelic title.

== O'Neills of Martinique and France ==
By the later nineteenth century, the heads of an O'Neill family of Martinique had come to call themselves Comte de Tyrone, and their younger brothers, after the French fashion, Vicomte de Tyrone. One of these vicomtes, François-Henry O'Neill de Tyrone (1812–1895), came to live in France and married one Hermine de la Ponce; her father published the family claim to be lineally descended from Earl Hugh O'Neill and his son Shane in the Annuaire de la noblesse de France in 1859 (he uses Comte to translate Earl, as is proper in French). Ponce translated this into English, and published it first in the Irishman newspaper, then in the Kilkenny and South-East Ireland Archaeological Society, in 1866, translating Comte back into English as Count. Hence the title of Count of Tyrone. This descent was questioned at the time; part of the Kilkenny paper defends its claims against criticism. Nevertheless, two genealogies from before the First World War summarized the information provided; later sources say it "does not bear examination" and has never been proved.

Ponce gives an account of Earl Hugh's sons which arranges their fates quite differently than later sources; in his version, Brian O'Neill was not murdered as a schoolboy, but grew up to be killed at Barcelona in 1641; Shane O'Neill had a son Patrick, and both of them survived to join Owen Roe O'Neill on his expedition into Ireland. Patrick married there, and his son James settled in Martinique during the reign of James II.

The only evidence Ponce presents linking this Patrick O'Neill with the Earls of Tyrone is a single sentence in Gaelic and Latin, identifying the second head of the Martinique family as "Henry, son of James, son of Patrick, son of Shane, son of Hugh, son of Matthew, son of Conn Bacach, son of Conn Mor ..." from a parchment in the possession of the Vicomte François-Henry O'Neill.

The descent of the Martinique O'Neills is as follows;

- James O'Neill, (1660-?), settled in Martinique, son of Patrick.
- Henry O'Neill (1688–1756)
- Jacques-Henry O'Neill (c. 1728 - c.1789)
- Paul-François-Henry O'Neill (1749-?)
- Jacques O'Neill (1783–1849)
- Louis-Jacques-Tiburce O'Neill (1810-?) unmarried 1866, d. childless.
- François-Henry O'Neill (1812–1895)

François-Henry was Louis-Jacques-Tiburce's younger brother, Ponce's son-in-law, and carried the title to France. He had three daughters; the eldest, Augusta Eugenie Valentine, married Hermann von Bodman, of the Grand Duchy of Baden.

Baroness von Bodman met with her surviving sister Marie Anne Marguerite O'Neill in a French notary's office in 1901, with various O'Neill claimants, and issued a paper recognizing Jorge O'Neill of the Lisbon and Clanaboy O'Neills, as successor to Tyrone: as Peter Berresford Ellis observes, this was not in their power either under the law of the Kingdom of Ireland or under brehon law. In Brehon law, the men of the O'Neills could decide their next leader, but the considerable rights of women under the brehons did not include a voice in that decision. Under Irish law, the Earldom descends by patent to heirs male; any right to it François-Henry O'Neill had possessed would either pass to the next surviving line of male heirs at his death, or be extinguished if there weren't any.

== Other claims ==
Other claims to the Earldom of Tyrone or the leadership of the O'Neills have been raised since the younger Shane O'Neill's death before Barcelona in 1641. Shane O'Neill had been expected to command an O'Neill force in Ireland; Owen Roe O'Neill, his illegitimate cousin, was appointed to replace him; before Owen Roe even reached Ireland, Luke Wadding expressed concern that he would claim the Earldom and there would be conflict between him and Sir Felim O'Neill, also in arms. Hugh Bourke wrote to Wadding that

"As to what you write touching Don Eugenio, I apprehend no such danger; he is not disposed to claim more than his father enjoyed, for he acknowledges that all the immediate right to the earldom of Tyrone belongs to Don Constantino, who is in Spain. So long as he lives, Don Eugenio can claim nothing, as he publicly acknowledges, offering to serve no matter who—Don Felim or another, in the common cause of religion and the realm, and that he goes not thither to command, but to receive what they may be minded to accord him and lay upon him, and that, if the realm should deem Don Felim to be Earl of Tyrone, he would be the first to obey, as he claims only the right to serve God and enjoy the portion that falls to him of his fathers' inheritance. The first thing is to purge the land of heretics, and see that the Catholic religion is set in its true place: thereafter the Kingdom or King will consider the rights of each particular person, and establish them by ordinance."

There was once a peerage claim to the Earldom of Tyrone in the records of the Irish House of Lords for 1717, now lost; this may, however, refer to the second creation of 1673, which was already extinct. (The heiress of the Powers earls was a single granddaughter, who married Sir Marcus Beresford in 1717; her husband was eventually created Viscount and then Earl of Tyrone, the third creation of the title.)

== Sources ==
Short form, when not the author's surname, listed first.

- Annuaire: "Notice historique et généalogique de la maison O'Neill de Tyrone", Annuaire de la noblesse de France et des maisons souveraines de l'Europe ed. par M. Borel D'Hautderive. Vol 16, pp. 243–50 (1859); unsigned, but M. de la Ponce takes credit for it in the article in the Kilkenny Review.
- Complete Peerage, Vol XII, Part II, pp. 136–9 ("TYRONE, Earl of", first creation) and Vol. XII, Part II, Appendix C, suppl. p. 12-13. The appendix contains the claimants from the line of Art mac Baron; its final footnote deals with both lines of Counts of Tyrone.
- Peter Berresford Ellis, Erin’s Blood Royal: the royal Gaelic dynasties of Ireland, London 1999; chapter X deals with Ulster.
- Kilkenny: Untitled notice received from M. de la Ponce, in The Journal of the Kilkenny and South-east of Ireland Archaeological Society, Vol 5, pp. 457-464.
- John O'Hart, Irish Pedigrees; Part III, Chapter IV, section 5; cited as "O' Hart". In the fifth Dublin edition of 1892, this is Vol I, pp. 739-40.
- Parliamentary Papers: Royal Commission on Historical Manuscripts: Report on Franciscan manuscripts preserved at the convent, Merchants' quay, Dublin. Dublin, 1906.
- Ruvigny: Melville Henry Massue, marquis de Ruvigny et de Ravenal: Titled Nobility of Europe, London, 1914.
- Walsh, "Will": Micheline Kerney Walsh: The Will of John O'Neill, Third Earl of Tyrone"; Seanchas Ardmhacha: Journal of the Armagh Diocesan Historical Society, Vol. 7, No. 2 (1974), pp. 320-325.
- Walsh: "The Last Earls": Micheline Kerney Walsh: "The Last Earls of Tyrone in Spain and Captain Bernardo O Neill, Illegitimate Son of Eoghan Rua", Seanchas Ardmhacha: Journal of the Armagh Diocesan Historical Society, Vol. 13, No. 1 (1988), pp. 33–58.
