= Dermot O'Neill =

Dermot O'Neill may refer to:

- Dermot O'Neill (gardener) (died 2022), Irish gardener, author, magazine editor and TV presenter
- Dermot O'Neill (footballer) (born 1960), Irish association football player
- Diarmuid O'Neill (1969–1996), Irish republican
