= Jacob Frederico Torlade Pereira de Azambuja =

Portuguese diplomat, noble (1788–1847)

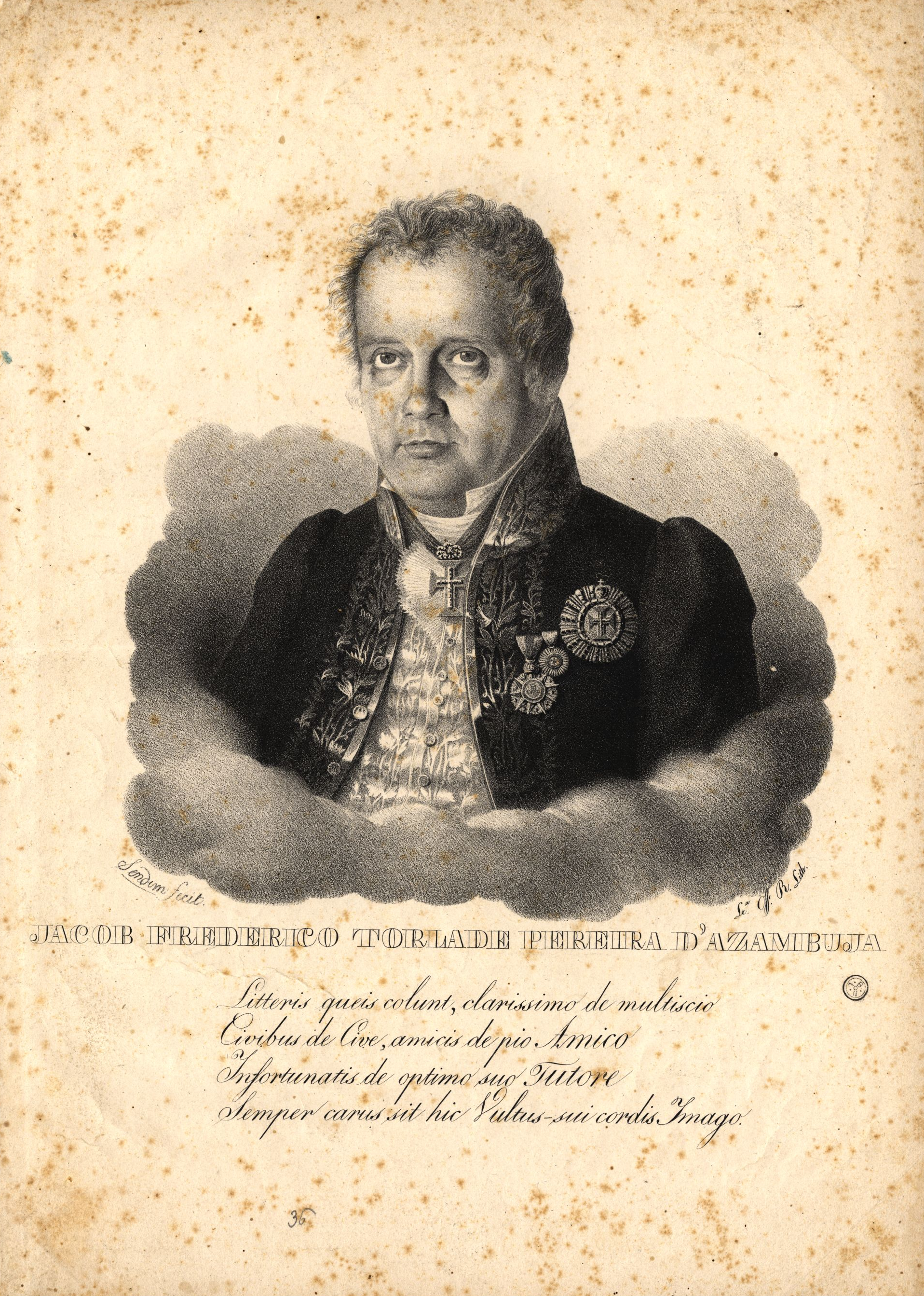
Jacob Frederico Torlade Pereira d'Azambuja, c. 1830, by Maurício José do Carmo Sendim

Jacob Frederico Torlade Pereira de Azambuja (28 February 1788 – 6 September 1847) was a Portuguese Civil Servant and Diplomat, maternal grandson of Jacob Frederico Torlade and wife Maria Inácia Gonçalves.

== Career ==
He was an Officer-Major of the Secretaries of State of Foreign Affairs and of the Navy and Overseas Dominions, Councillor of State, Diplomat (he was, nominately, charged of political and commercial businesses of Portugal in Madrid), Consul of Russia in Setúbal, Moço of the Royal Chamber of the Royal Household (Alvará of 14 July 1823), Fidalgo of Coat of Arms (Letter of 6 February 1826, for Pereira de Azambuja), Knight of the Order of Christ and the Royal Order of Our Lady of the Concepcion of Vila Viçosa, etc.
