= Hugh O'Neill =

Hugh O'Neill or O'Neil may refer to:

== Irish nobles ==
- Hugh Boy O'Neill, the last ruler of the Cenél nEógain to be styled as king of Ailech
- Hugh O'Neill (d. 1524), king of Clandeboye in medieval Ireland
- Hugh O'Neill, Earl of Tyrone (c. 1550–1616), Irish chieftain who resisted the annexation of Ireland by Elizabeth I of England
- Hugh Oge O'Neill (died 1586)
- Hugh Gavelagh O'Neill (died 1590), Irish nobleman
- Hugh McShane O'Neill, Irish nobleman and rebel
- Hugh O'Neill, 4th Baron Dungannon (c. 1585–1609), Irish nobleman
- Hugh Dubh O'Neill (1611–1660), Irish soldier who commanded the defenders in the Siege of Clonmel and Siege of Limerick
- Hugh O'Neill, 1st Baron Rathcavan (1883–1982), Ulster Unionist politician who served as Father of the House of Commons
- Hugh O'Neill, 3rd Baron Rathcavan (born 1939)

== Other ==
- Hugh O'Neil (1936–2015), Canadian politician
- Hugh O'Neil (baseball), 19th-century baseball player
- Hugh O'Neill (artist) (1784–1824), English artist
- Hugh O'Neill (soccer) (born 1954), American soccer player
- Hugh O'Neill (bishop) (1898–1955), coadjutor bishop of Dunedin, New Zealand, 1943–1946
- Hugh O'Neill (Canadian football) (born 1990), Canadian football punter and placekicker
- Hugh O’Neill (GAA Dublin minor star) - victor of Gaelic A Dublin championship 2024

== See also ==
- Hugh O'Neills, Gaelic football team in Leeds, England
- O'Neill Building, originally Hugh O'Neill's Dry Goods Store, an 1887 landmarked in the Flatiron District of New York City
