= Justice Neil =

Justice Neil may refer to:

- A. B. Neil (1873–1966), associate justice of the Tennessee Supreme Court
- Matthew M. Neil (1849–1925), associate justice of the Tennessee Supreme Court

== See also ==
- Tom W. Neal (c. 1873–1944), associate justice of the New Mexico Supreme Court
- Marshall Allen Neill (1914–1979), associate justice of the Washington Supreme Court
- Justice O'Neill (disambiguation)
