= Noémia Delgado =

Portuguese screenwriter, film editor and director

- Born: Noémia Delgado; 7 June 1933; Huíla, Angola
- Died: 2 March 2016 (aged 82)
- Occupations: Screenwriter, director, film editor

Noémia Delgado (7 June 1933 – 2 March 2016) was a Portuguese television and film screenwriter, film editor and director.

== Background ==
She was the daughter of Luís Delgado (21 August 1900 – 8 December 1986) and his wife Judite da Conceição de Freitas.

== Marriage and child ==
On 27 December 1957, Noémia Delgado married writer and poet Alexandre O'Neill; they divorced on 15 January 1971. The couple had a son:

- Alexandre Delgado O'Neill (Lisbon, 23 December 1959 – Lisbon, Portugal, 4 January 1993), a photographer, unmarried and without issue

== Filmography ==
- Mudar de Vida (1966) Film editor
- The Pearl of the Atlantic (1969) Assistant Film Editor
- Sever do Vouga... Uma Experiência (1971) Film editor
- O Passado e o Presente (1972) Assistant Film Editor
- A Pousada das Chagas (1972) Film editor
- Meus Amigos (1974) Film editor
- Torre Bela aka Cooperativa Agrícola Torre Bela or Cooperativa Torre Bela (Portugal: TV title) (1975) (TV) Television editor
- Máscaras (1976) Film director
- Deus, Pátria e Autoridade (1976) Collaborator
- A Princesinha das Rosas (1981) (TV) Television writer, Production sound mixer, Television editor and Television director
- Tiaga (1981) (TV) Television writer, Television editor and Television director
- O Defunto (1981) (TV) Television writer, Television editor and Television director
- O Canto da Sereia (1983) (TV) Television writer, Television editor and Television director
- A Noite de Walpurgis (1983) (TV) Television writer, Television editor and Television director
- A Estranha Morte do Professor Antena (1983) (TV) Television writer, Television editor, Production manager and Television director
- Quem Foste, Alvarez? (1988)
