= Nicholas O'Neill =

Nicholas O'Neill may refer to:

- Nicholas O'Neill (composer) (born 1970), English composer
- Nicholas O'Neill (writer) (1985–2003), American writer, musician, actor
