= Matthew O'Neill =

Matthew O'Neill may refer to:

- Matthew O'Neill, 1st Baron Dungannon (died 1558), Irish aristocrat
- Matthew O'Neill (footballer) (born 1984), English football midfielder
- Matthew O'Neill (filmmaker), American documentary filmmaker and director
