= Ted O'Neill =

Theodore A. "Ted" O'Neill was the Dean of Admissions at the University of Chicago and a prominent figure in the college admissions community, and is now as a full-time teacher, researcher and writer in the university's Humanities department. O'Neill, nicknamed "the Dean of Love", was known for his humorous annual welcome addresses, eccentric application essay questions, and general geniality; as such, he serves unofficially in the role of "campus legend".
