= Ryan O'Neill =

Ryan O'Neill may refer to:

- Ryan O'Neill (author) (born 1975), Australian author and academic
- Ryan O'Neill (Northern Irish footballer) (born 1990), Northern Irish footballer

== See also ==
- Ryan O'Neal (born 1941), American actor
