= Joseph O'Neill (writer, born 1886) =

Joseph O'Neill (1886-1952) was an Irish novelist.

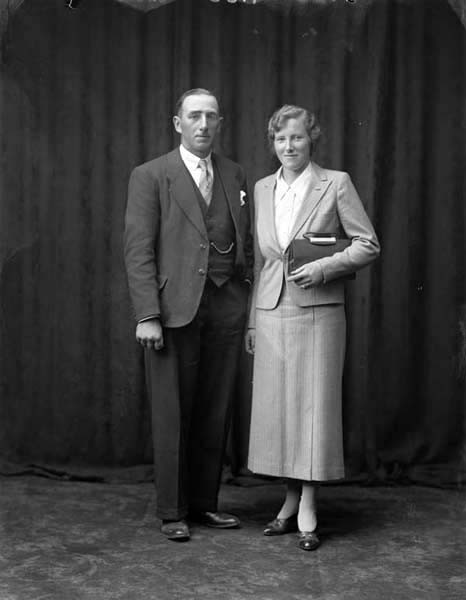
Joseph O'Neill and Mary Devenport on their wedding day in 1908

== Biography ==
O'Neill claimed later in his life that he was born in the Aran Islands, County Galway, Ireland, in 1886, but he was in fact born in the inland Galway town of Tuam, preferring, as a writer, the perceived romance of being born in the Gaelic-speaking islands. He became a school inspector and subsequently Secretary of the Department of Education in the newly formed Irish Free State. He wrote five novels, of which the best-known was Land Under England (1935), a science-fiction account of a totalitarian society ruled by telepathic mind control. The novel combines elements of a "lost race" narrative (the descendants of a Roman legion live underground under the north of England) with fears of totalitarian control. Land Under England has an anti-fascist subtext. The novel was cited by Karl Edward Wagner as one of the thirteen best science-fiction horror novels. His other SF novel, published in 1936, is the future-war story Day of Wrath. His other novels include the time travel (or timeslip novel) Wind From the North, in which the author is transported in a dreamlike fashion to Dublin or Dyflin in the period leading up to the Battle of Clontarf in 1014, and Philip, a biblical epic. Wind from the North was later a standard Irish primary school text in the 1950s, in an edition published by Browne & Nolan.

He died on 6 May 1952.

== Personal life ==
O'Neill was the husband of a noted writer in her own right — Mary Devenport O'Neill. She was a poet and friend of W. B. Yeats, who consulted her when writing 'A Vision'.

== List of works ==
- Wind From the North (1934) Jonathan Cape, UK; Simon & Schuster, US
- Land Under England (1935) Gollancz ISBN 0-14-008956-X
- Day of Wrath (1936) Gollancz
- Philip (1940) Gollancz
- Chosen by the Queen (1947)
