= Keith O'Neill =

Keith O'Neill may refer to:

- Keith O'Neill (drummer), drummer with the band Cast
- Keith O'Neill (footballer) (born 1976), footballer who represented the Republic of Ireland
- Keith O'Neill (fiddler), Irish-American fiddler

== See also ==
- Keith O'Neil (born 1980), American football linebacker
