= Richard O'Neill =

Richard O'Neill may refer to:

- Richard O'Neill (author) (born 1943), Anglo-Irish author and editor
- Richard O'Neill (politician) (1847–1908), Australian politician
- Richard W. O'Neill (1897–1982), U.S. Army soldier and Medal of Honor recipient
- Wally O'Neill (Richard Wallace O'Neill, 1902–1974), American football player
- Dick O'Neill (Richard Francis O'Neill), American character actor
