= Pat O'Neill =

Pat O'Neill may refer to:

== Sportspeople ==
- Pat O'Neill (American football) (born 1971), American football player
- Pat O'Neill (Dublin footballer) (born 1950), Dublin Gaelic footballer and manager
- Pat O'Neill (Galway footballer) (born 1956), Galway Gaelic footballer
- Pat O'Neill (Kilkenny hurler) (born 1970), hurler for Kilkenny
- Pat O'Neill (Tipperary hurler), hurler for Tipperary

== Other people ==
- Pat O'Neill (filmmaker) (born 1939), American experimental filmmaker
- Pat O'Neill (Kilkenny politician) (born 1958), member of Seanad Éireann

== See also ==
- Patrick O'Neill (disambiguation)
- Patrick O'Neal (disambiguation)
