= Michael O'Neill =

Michael, Mike, or Mikey O'Neill may refer to:

== Arts and entertainment ==
- Mike O'Neill (costume designer) (1945-2018), British-Irish costume designer
- Michael O'Neill (actor) (born 1951), American actor
- Michael O'Neill (academic) (1953–2018), English poet
- Mike O'Neill (musician) (born 1970), Canadian singer-songwriter

== Law and politics ==
- Michael C. O'Neill (1888–1943), American politician
- Michael O'Neill (politician) (1909–1976), Irish politician
- Michael O'Neill (diplomat) (born 1967), British diplomat

== Sports ==
- Mike O'Neill (baseball) (1877–1959), Irish-born American baseball player
- Mike O'Neill (basketball) (born 1928), American basketball player
- Mike O'Neill (lacrosse) (fl. 1970s), American lacrosse player
- Mike O'Neill (rugby league) (born 1960), English rugby league footballer
- Mike O'Neill (ice hockey) (born 1967), Canadian ice hockey goaltender
- Michael O'Neill (footballer) (born 1969), Northern Irish football player and manager
- Mikey O'Neill (footballer) (born 2004), English footballer

== Others ==
- Michael E. O'Neill (born 1946), American business executive
- Michael O'Neill (educator), American non-profit management educator

== See also ==
- Michael O'Neal (born 1951), American lawyer and politician
- Mickey O'Neil (1900–1964), American baseball player
