= Mark O'Neill =

Mark O'Neill may refer to:

- Mark O'Neill (rugby league) (born 1975), Australian rugby league footballer of the 1990s and 2000s
- Mark A. O'Neill (born 1959), British entomologist and computer scientist
- Mark O'Neill (TV personality) (born 1984), Irish television personality and producer
- Mark O'Neill (cricketer) (born 1959), Australian cricketer
