= Martha Mary O'Neill =

Irish-born Australian Sister of Mercy nun and schoolteacher

Mother Patricia

Personal life
- Born: Martha Mary O'Neill; 18 November 1878 Cork, Ireland
- Died: 25 November 1972 (aged 94) Geelong, Australia
- Known for: Superior General, Australia Union of Sisters of Mercy

Religious life
- Religion: Catholic
- Denomination: Roman Catholic
- Order: Sisters of Mercy

Martha Mary O'Neill (1878–1972), known by her religious name as Mother Patricia, was an Australian nun who became superior general for the Australian Union of the Sisters of Mercy. She was born in Cork, Ireland, and emigrated with her family to Victoria, Australia, in 1886. She joined the Sisters of Mercy as a young woman, professing her vows in 1903. She became superior general of the newly formed Australian Union of the Sisters of Mercy in 1954, and served in this role for twelve years, retiring in 1966.

== Early years ==
Martha Mary O'Neill was born on 18 November 1878, in Cork, Ireland. Her parents were William O'Neill, who was an accountant, and Hannah O'Neill (née O'Regan). She was their first child. In 1886, the family emigrated to Australia and settled in Kyneton, Victoria. O'Neill was enrolled at the Sisters of Mercy convent school in Kyneton. She began teaching in 1898 at the St. Bridget's school in Maldon, Victoria.

== Religious life ==
On 26 April 1899, she began her novitiate at the Institute of our Lady of Mercy in Geelong, Victoria. She professed her final vows on 17 February 1903. She choose Patricia as her religious name, and became known as Sister Patricia. The Sisters of Mercy is a religious order founded by Mother Catherine McAuley. It was established in 1831 in Dublin, Ireland; foundations were later established globally. The first Sisters of Mercy foundation in Australia was founded in Freemantle by Mother Ursula Frayne who travelled from Ireland to Australia in 1946. The Geelong convent was established by Mother Xavier Maguire in 1860.

One of the priorities for the Sisters of Mercy was education. After her profession of vows, Patricia was transferred to Melbourne, where she taught at primary schools in the area. She spent three years teaching before returning to Geelong. She began training other sisters to become teachers, and taught classes at the Sacred Heart College. She furthered her own education by attending classes at the University of Melbourne, completing coursework for a diploma of education and a bachelor of arts degree. She chose not to have the degrees conferred.

She joined the Ascot Vale convent in 1917, and was appointed to serve as the acting-principal of the college at the Mater Misericordiae Novitiate and Training College, where she oversaw training for Catholic teachers and nuns. In this role she taught many Sisters of Mercy who would go on to be influential in the order, including Mother Phillipa, who was influential in health care and became hospital superior for the Mercy Private Hospital in Melbourne. By 1935, Sister Patricia had become principal at the college.

Having served as superior of the Ascot Vale convent, in 1939 Patricia became the mother-general for the Sisters of Mercy in Victoria and Tasmania, overseeing forty independent houses with over 400 members.

Patricia was a supporter of plans to affiliate independent Sister of Mercy congregations in Australia, and establish a centralized organization. This movement of consolidation had begun in 1905 when Australian bishops had urged small congregations of religious orders to merge with others who had a similar origin. Over the next several decades, through mergers and amalgamation, the number of autonomous Mercy congregations had settled at seventeen. In 1954, eight of these congregations agreed to join to form the Congregation of the Australian Union of the Sisters of Our Lady of Mercy.

After the Union was established, Patricia was appointed as its first superior-general. She moved to Canberra, where she lived in the St. Anne's convent. She traveled widely to visit the eight congregations in her charge. At the request of Archbishop Romolo Carboni, Mother Patricia also commissioned a group of nuns to serve in the territory of Papua and New Guinea in 1955.

== Death ==
In 1966, Patricia retired and returned to the convent in Geelong. She died on 25 November 1972.
