= Peggy O'Neal =

Peggy O'Neal may refer to:

- Peggy O'Neal (lawyer), Australian rules football official
- Peggy O'Neal (voice actress)
