= Mary Devenport O'Neill =

Irish poet

name = Mary Devenport O'Neill Mary Devenport O'Neill
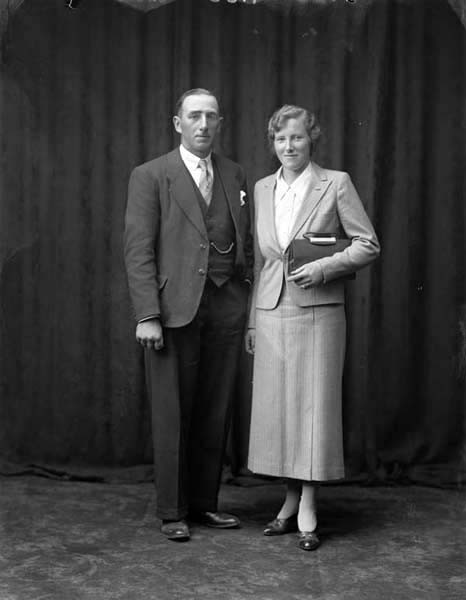
- Mary Devenport and Joseph O'Neill on their wedding day in 1908
- Born: Mary Devenport; 3 August 1879; Barrack Street, Loughrea, County Galway
- Died: 1967 (aged 87–88); Dublin
- Spouse: Joseph O'Neill

Mary Devenport O'Neill (3 August 1879 – 1967) was an Irish poet and dramatist and a friend and colleague of W. B. Yeats, George Russell, and Austin Clarke.

== Early life and education ==
Mary Devenport O'Neill was born Mary Devenport on 3 August 1879 in Barrack Street, Loughrea, County Galway. She was the daughter of RIC sub-constable, John Devenport, and his wife Bridget (née Burke). She attended the Dominican convent, Eccles Street, Dublin before enrolling in the Metropolitan School of Art from 1898 to 1903. In 1900 she won the year's prize in the School of Art. She appears to have considered teaching as a career, as she is listed on the college register as a teacher in training from 1901 to 1903. It was while an art student that she started to correspond with the writer she admired, Joseph O'Neill. Their relationship developed, and the couple married on 19 June 1908, settling in Kenilworth Square, Dublin.

== Career ==
Many of her husband's friends disapproved of her modern and unconventional ideas, but she was popular with "the Rathgar Group" who attended George Russell's Sunday salons. After a few years, O'Neill established her own salon referred to as "Thursdays at home", attended by Russell, Padraic Colum, W. B. Yeats, Richard Irvine Best, Frank O'Connor, Francis Stuart and Iseult Gonne. She was interested in mysticism and it was this that formed an important dimension of her friendship with Yeats, who she confided in. Yeats recorded their weekly consultations in his diary while working on A Vision (1925). In the Oxford Book of Modern Verse 1892-1935 from 1936, he included one of O'Neill's poems. In 1917, she contributed lyrics to her husband's play The kingdom maker. She published her only book in 1929, Prometheus and other poems. After this she occasionally contributed primarily modernist plays and poetry to The Dublin Magazine, The Irish Times and The Bell. O'Neill collaborated with Austin Clarke from the Lyric Theatre Company on her plays Bluebeard (1933) and Cain (1945).

== Later life ==
O'Neill suffered with poor health, which saw her and her husband spending extended periods in the south of France and Switzerland. They sold their home in Dublin in August 1950 and moved to Nice, with the intention of settling there. However, due to rapidly depleting finances they were forced to return to Ireland in April 1951. From then they rented a cottage in Wicklow from their friend Con Curran. When her husband died in 1953, O'Neill went to live with relatives in Dublin. She died there in 1967.

== Works ==
- Prometheus and Other Poems. London: Jonathan Cape, 1929.
- “To Austin Clarke,” 1929-1948. NLI. MS 38,665/7.
- “Abbey Theatre Papers Bluebeard.” Typescripts of Bluebeard a ballet poem. 1933. NLI
- “Cain.” The Dublin Magazine 19, no. Spring (1938): 30-36.
- “Dead in Wars and in Revolutions.” The Dublin Magazine, no. Winter (1941).
- “Lost Legions.” The Dublin Magazine 24, no. Spring (1949).
- “Out of the Darkness.” The Dublin Magazine 22, no. Summer (1947): 1-24.
- “Scene-Shifter Death.” The Dublin Magazine 19, no. Spring (1944): 2-3.
- “The Visiting Moon.” The Dublin Magazine 23, no. Spring (1948): 1-2.
