= Lawrence O'Neill =

Lawrence O'Neill may refer to:

- Lawrence Joseph O'Neill (born 1952), United States federal judge
- Lawrence O'Neil (born 1954), Canadian former Member of Parliament and current federal judge

== See also ==
- Laurence O'Neill (1874–1943), Irish politician, Lord Mayor of Dublin 1917–1924
