= Pauline O'Neill =

Pauline O'Neill may refer to:

- Pauline O'Neill (sister), first president of Saint Mary's College in Notre Dame, Indiana
- Pauline O'Neill (suffrage leader) (1865–1961), suffrage leader, Arizona state legislator, and widow of Buckey O'Neill
