= Paul O'Neill =

Paul O'Neill may refer to:

== Sports ==
- Paul O'Neill (baseball) (born 1963), former Major League Baseball player and current broadcaster
- Paul O'Neill (cyclist), Australian Paralympian
- Paul O'Neill (footballer) (born 1982), English footballer
- Paul O'Neill (gymnast) (born 1965), American gymnast
- Paul O'Neill (racing driver) (born 1979), racecar driver

== Other people ==
- Paul O'Neill (author) (1928–2013), Canadian historian, writer and producer
- Paul O'Neill (newspaper editor), editor of The Irish Times
- Paul O'Neill (producer) (1956–2017), American rock music producer, composer and guitarist
- Paul H. O'Neill (1935–2020), American businessman and U.S. Secretary of the Treasury

== See also ==
- Paul O'Neal, Chicago police shooting victim
- Paul O'Neal (politician), North Carolina politician
- Paul O'Neil (born 1953), American ice hockey player
