= Justice O'Neill =

Justice O'Neill may refer to:

- C. William O'Neill (1916–1978), associate justice and chief justice of the Ohio Supreme Court
- Harriet O'Neill (born 1957), associate justice of the Supreme Court of Texas
- William O'Neill (Ohio judge) (born 1947), associate justice of the Ohio Supreme Court

== See also ==
- Charles Austin O'Niell (1869–1951), associate justice of the Louisiana Supreme Court
- John Belton O'Neall (1793–1863), judge on the precursor of the South Carolina Supreme Court
- Lawrence O'Neil (born 1954), associate chief justice of the Nova Scotia Supreme Court
- Justice Neil (disambiguation)
