= Patrick O'Neal =

Patrick O'Neal is the name of:

- Patrick O'Neal (actor) (1927–1994), American television, stage and film actor
- Patrick O'Neal (sportscaster) (born 1967), studio host and reporter for Fox Sports West/Prime Ticket in Los Angeles

== See also ==
- Patrick O'Neill (disambiguation)
- Pat O'Neill (disambiguation)
- Patrice O'Neal, an American comedian and actor
