= Gary O'Neill =

Gary, or Garry, O'Neill, or O'Neil, may refer to:

- Gary O'Neil (born 1983), English footballer and manager
- Gary O'Neil (Neighbours), a fictional character on Australian soap Neighbours
- Garry O'Neill (born 1974), Australian martial artist
- Gary O'Neill (footballer, born 1995), Irish footballer

== See also ==
- Gary Neil, Scottish footballer
