= Dennis O'Neill =

Dennis O'Neill may refer to:

- Dennis O'Neill (baseball) (1866–1912), 19th-century baseball player
- Dennis O'Neill (manslaughter victim), British manslaughter victim
- Dennis O'Neill (rugby league), rugby league footballer of the 1970s for Great Britain, and Widnes
- Dennis O'Neill (tenor) (born 1948), Welsh tenor

== See also ==
- Dennis O'Neil (1939–2020) aka Denny O'Neill, American comic book writer and editor
- Dennis Patrick O'Neil (1940–2003), Roman Catholic bishop
- Denis O'Neil (born 1936), Australian sailor
