= Byron O'Neill =

Byron O'Neill (born September 29, 1970) is an American artist, as well as a design director at Jager DiPaola Kemp Design. O'Neill has gained much recognition in the past decade for his work on Burton Snowboards.

== Early life ==
O'Neill was born in Detroit, Michigan, but travelled through his entire childhood as he was raised in a military family. One of eight children, O'Neill began creating art at a very early age. His mother, Laciel Frances O'Neill was an art school teacher by trade, and taught on the military bases of both Ohio and Missouri. His younger siblings, twins Bill and Linda, also practice art today.

O'Neill eventually settled in southern California to first study human sciences, then design, at UCLA, graduating in 1994.

== Family ==
In studies is when O'Neill met his first wife, Eillene Lemay, a botanist, who also studied at UCLA.

In 1996, O'Neill divorced Lemay, and remarried. He and his wife currently reside in Vermont, and have four children.

Byron has one adopted Mexican brother named Danny Garcia. As children O'neill introduced Garcia to skateboarding, and has been credited for Garcia's love of the sport.

== Career ==
O'Neill held several design positions in California including, but not limiting to EXPN, Phyla CrossMedia, Syrup Design, Sapient and Walt Disney. In 1997 O'Neill moved to Burlington, Vermont to work at JDK. This is where O'Neill won several design awards with AIGA.

In 2006, O'Neill was promoted to art director, and has held the position since.

== Exhibitions ==
O'Neill has had both solo art shows, as well as group shows, all across the United States, most recently Geographically Speaking in San Francisco.

He is also a member of the Iskraprint Collective.
