= Mildred O'Neill =

Mildred O'Neill (1914? – October 6, 2003) was the wife of Speaker of the United States House of Representatives Tip O'Neill from 1941 to his death in 1994. She was his "eyes and ears" during political campaigns.

O'Neill spent her husband's first seven terms in the House living in North Cambridge, Massachusetts, and moved to Washington, D.C. in 1976. Her husband retired in 1986. In 1989 Nancy Reagan presented her with the Lincoln Medal in recognition of her fundraising for Ford's Theatre.

She died of a heart attack on October 6, 2003. She was 89.
