= Kevin O'Neill =

Kevin O'Neill may refer to:

== Sports ==
- Kevin O'Neill (basketball) (born 1957), American basketball coach
- Kevin O'Neill (cricketer) (1919–2014), Australian cricketer
- Kevin O'Neill (Australian footballer) (1908–1985), Australian football player
- Kevin O'Neill (soccer) (born 1925), Australian soccer player
- Kevin O'Neill (rugby union) (born 1982), New Zealand rugby union player
- Kevin O'Neill (Gaelic footballer), former Kildare footballer
- Kevin O'Neill (American football) (born 1975), American football linebacker

== Others ==
- Kevin O'Neill (comics) (1953–2022), English comic book illustrator
- Kevin O'Neil (mobster) (born 1948), American former bar owner and mobster
