= Thomas O'Neill (journalist) =

American journalist

Thomas M. O'Neill (December 26, 1904 – April 9, 1971) was an American journalist. His work while at the Baltimore Sun landed him on the White House "Enemies List" compiled by the staff of President Richard Nixon.

Born in Norfolk, Virginia, he attended public schools in Palmetto, Florida. He worked as a reporter for the Baltimore News and later the Baltimore Evening Sun and Baltimore Morning Sun, covering almost every beat. His work was complimented by H. L. Mencken, and he moved up to covering state politics. He became, successively, a national political writer (starting with covering the Al Smith presidential campaign in 1928), the Sun's correspondent in London at the height of World War II, a foreign correspondent who made studies of postwar conditions in Greece, France and the Low Countries. His work was hailed by, among others, New York Times columnist Russell Baker (in his book Good Times) and by essayist and BBC correspondent Alistair Cooke, who described O'Neill's coverage of the trials of Alger Hiss as "incomparable" in A Generation on Trial.

In 1943, he opened the London bureau of the Sun to cover war news and remained in Europe for the duration. This period of his career is described in Combat Correspondents—The Baltimore Sun in World War II, written by former Sun editorial page editor Joseph R.L. Sterne and published by the Maryland Historical Society.

It was during his assignment to the Hiss case in the early 1950s that he first met Richard Nixon. O'Neill covered at least 16 national political conventions up through those that nominated Hubert Humphrey and Nixon in 1968, with the exception of the years he worked abroad. For almost 20 years, starting in 1953, he wrote a column, "Politics and People," that appeared in the morning Sun and was syndicated to many other papers.

O'Neill died in Baltimore, Maryland in 1971. The "Sun" marked his passing with an editorial that observed, "his standards of public morality were so high that not many could measure up to them. Looking always for honest men, he found but a few in public life whose motives were not those of self-serving expediency; and he said so. That politicians often quailed under his gaze was no wonder, for the gaze was piercing."
