= Diarmuid O'Neill =

Provisional IRA member

Diarmuid O'Neill (also known as Dermot O'Neill) (born 24 June 1969 in Hammersmith, London, England – 23 September 1996), was a volunteer in the Provisional Irish Republican Army (IRA). O'Neill was killed in London in 1996 during a police raid on the hotel where he and two other IRA volunteers were staying. Due to the circumstances surrounding the killing, Amnesty International has called for a review of the police investigation into the killing of O'Neill. O'Neill was the only IRA member to be killed by police in Great Britain.

== Background ==
O'Neill was born and raised in London, the youngest son of Irish parents, Eoghan and Theresa "Terry" O'Neill, who were originally from County Kildare and County Dublin. O'Neill had one sister, Siobhán, and one brother, Shane. He was a former pupil of the London Oratory School, a Roman Catholic school in Fulham, London, where he was described as cheerful, well behaved and outgoing. From an early age, he took an interest in Irish culture and nationalism and spent much of his time between County Cork and London. O'Neill was also involved in supporting Basque nationalism and visited the Basque Country on several occasions with his Basque-born girlfriend, Karmele Ereno. While he was known to hold republican views, his involvement in the IRA was not widely known until a few days after his killing by the London Metropolitan Police.

Soon after leaving school, O'Neill served nine months in a young offenders' institution for his role in a £75,000 cash fraud at a Bank of Ireland branch in Shepherd's Bush, west London, where he was employed. Some of the stolen cash was transferred to the IRA.

== Death ==
O'Neill was shot and killed by London Metropolitan Police's specialist firearms unit, SO19, at Glenthorne Road, Hammersmith, London in September 1996, during a raid on suspected IRA weapons operations.

=== Surveillance operation ===
In the six weeks leading up to the shooting of O'Neill, the Metropolitan Police of London had kept O'Neill and fellow IRA Volunteers, Brian McHugh and Patrick Kelly, under intensive police surveillance including bugging of O'Neill's room and video surveillance. Commander John Grieve, who was Head of the Metropolitan Police Anti-Terrorist Branch at the time, stated that the extent of that operation exceeded that of others carried out in Britain by far.

The surveillance operation resulted in extensive video footage that reportedly covered the whole six weeks except the night of the raid on the hotel itself. These surveillance tapes suggested O'Neill's unit was planning to detonate a large lorry bomb in central London, and that the IRA men were ready to shoot to kill if the police tried to raid them.

=== Hotel raid ===
At 4.30 am, on 23 September, the Metropolitan Police conducted a raid on the hotel with the expressed intention of arresting all three. O'Neill was shot six times by a police officer who was only identified as "Officer Kilo". According to a report by Amnesty International, he was shot while trying to surrender and was then denied immediate medical care despite there being an ambulance at the scene. O'Neill later died in hospital. The results of the post-mortem examination carried out on the body of O'Neill showed a "patterned" bruise on his scalp which, in the opinion of the pathologist for the British Home Office, may have resulted from "an individual treading on his head".

After the raid, media reports claimed that there had been armed violent resistance during the raid. However these stories were denied and withdrawn when it became clear that O'Neill was not carrying a weapon at the time of the shooting. According to CAIN, ten tonnes of home-made explosives, two pounds of Semtex, rifles and other bomb equipment were recovered at another location following the raid.

=== Criminal Investigation Bureau ===
The Criminal Investigation Bureau of the Metropolitan Police, supervised by the Police Complaints Authority, subsequently conducted an investigation into the incident. The investigation took almost two years and produced a report in 1999 which stated that there was not enough evidence to prosecute the police officers involved in the killing.

=== Inquest ===
In February 2000, an inquest was held into O'Neill's death. The jury at Kingston upon Thames Crown Court took four hours to reach a majority verdict to rule that he was killed lawfully. Metropolitan Police Deputy Assistant Commissioner Alan Fry, head of New Scotland Yard's anti-terrorist branch, said: "The decision by the jury supports the actions by Officer Kilo and others who were faced with dangerous terrorists who were planning to bomb London and had access to explosives and firearms."

O'Neill was buried at St. Mologas' Cemetery, Timoleague, County Cork, Ireland.

=== Legacy ===
Every year since his death Sinn Féin has organised a commemoration in his memory and is attended by relatives. Musician Gary Og wrote a song about him titled 'Diarmuid O'Neill'.
