= O'Neill Building =

Building in Manhattan, New York

Coordinates: 40.74146°N 73.99387°W

The O'Neill Building seen from the north (2026)

The O'Neill Building is a landmarked former department store, located at 655-671 Sixth Avenue between West 20th and 21st Streets in the Flatiron District neighborhood of Manhattan, New York City. The building was originally Hugh O'Neill's Dry Goods Store, and was designed by Mortimer C. Merritt in the neo-Grec style. It was built to four stories in two stages between 1887 and 1890, to allow the existing O'Neill store to continue operating during construction, with the addition of a fifth floor in 1895, created by raising the pediment. The gilded corner domes of this cast-iron-fronted building were restored c.2000.

On the death of Hugh O'Neill in 1902, his heirs were unable to continue running the business, which was sold and merged in 1907 with the Adams Dry Goods Store immediately to the north at 675 Sixth Avenue. The combined business did not succeed and, like all the department stores in the Ladies' Mile, was gone by the advent of World War I. The building was converted to manufacturing lofts, and then back into offices around 1969. As of 2014, the building is owned by ElAd Properties, and was converted into condominiums in 2005.

On Christmas Day 2012 the building suffered a partial collapse of its facade and was evacuated.

The O'Neill Building is part of the Ladies' Mile Historic District, which was created by the New York City Landmarks Preservation Commission in 1989. In its designation report, the Commission wrote "Because of its architecture and history, the Hugh O'Neill Building is one of the department store buildings which give the Ladies Mile Historic District its special character."
