= Irish royal families =

Irish royal families were the dynasties that once ruled large "overkingdoms" and smaller petty kingdoms on the island of Ireland. Members of some of these families still own land and live in the same broad locations.

== Locality ==
Significant kingdoms known from early historical times (2nd–7th centuries) included Eóganachta, Corcu Loígde, Connachta, Uí Fiachrach, Breifne, Aileach, Airgíalla, Dál Riata, Ultonia, Brega, Mide, Laigin, Osraige, Laois, Muma, Iarmuman, Desmumu, Tuadmumu, Hy Many. Some disappeared or were annexed while others were self-governing until the end of the 16th century.

The Irish High Kings, seated at Tara, were sometimes recognised as supreme kings of the island from the time of Mael Seachnaill I (9th century), but the reality is that they were usually "kings with opposition", ruling maybe two or three of Ireland's provinces. In the period when the institution of high kingship existed, Ireland did not conduct much formal international diplomacy. After the Anglo-Norman invasion (1169 and forward), the native kingdoms lost status over time, though, for example, the Kingdom of Tyrconnell maintained occasional international relations and exchanged ambassadors with the Royal Courts of Scotland, Spain, and the Papacy. As was the case with the nations in what is now England, Scotland and Wales, the more powerful of the kingdoms of Ireland all regarded themselves as fully independent entities, rather as Germany was until 1871. In several cases they claimed utterly different racial backgrounds from neighbours, Ireland being home to "races" such as the Delbhna, Conmaicne Mara, Cruithne, Eóganachta or Deirgtine, Érainn, Fir Bolg, Grecraighe, Laigin, Ulaid, Mairtine, Dáirine, and a host of others. Few claimed to be homogeneous, despite later attempts to make them so.

== Surrender and regrant in the 16th century ==
From the 1530s Henry VIII of England adopted a policy of Surrender and regrant, whereby the ruling families would surrender the clan lands to the Crown who would grant them titles within the English legal system. In 1555 the Irish College of Arms was set up in Dublin to allow the new lords to acquire coats of arms as in the rest of Europe. This college generally accepted and copied the old genealogies. Some families successfully made the transition from kingdoms to earldoms or lordships – with the same ruling dynasty – into the 17th century and beyond, taking their seats in the Irish House of Lords. However, the wars of 1595–1603, 1641–1650 and 1689–1691 often resulted in a loss of land if they supported the losing side. By 1700 all had long been brought fully and firmly under the dominion of English rule, though local feeling for each area as a distinct entity lasted as least as late as the Great Famine. Many went into exile for educational or professional advancement (often in the military), while for those remaining the penal laws, especially relating to inheritance, over time meant many conformed to the Established Church and English culture to retain their land or risk losing it to family members who did. This further isolated them from their compatriots, the majority who remained Catholic.

== See also ==
- Kingdoms of Ireland
- Petty kingdom
- Irish kings
- Irish nobility
- Chief of the Name
- O'Donnell dynasty
- O'Brien dynasty
- MacDunleavy (dynasty)
- Irish genealogy
