= O'Neill (surname) =

Family name

- Pronunciation: oh-neel
- Language: Irish

Origin
- Meaning: Descendant of Niall
- Region of origin: Ulster, Ireland

Other names
- Related names: O'Neil, O'Niall, O'Neall, O'Neal, Neill

O'Neill is an Irish surname derived from the Gaelic Ó Néill meaning "descendant of Niall". The Uí Néill dynasty were the foremost dynasty of Ulster, and all Ireland, from the 5th century throughout the medieval period, until the Flight of the Earls in 1607 which saw the end of Gaelic Ireland. O'Neill is one of the most common Irish surnames.

== Origins ==
The surname O'Neill is an Anglicization of the original Irish Ua Néill, composed of the elements ua, meaning "grandson" or "descendant," and of the Irish name Niall. Niall is a male given name of Irish origin, to mean "champion" (derived from the Old Irish word niadh meaning warrior or champion). The progenitor of the family is said to be Niall Glúndub of the Cenél nEógain; however, his great-grandsons, who lived in the tenth century, would have been the first to use the surname.

It is due to the Anglicization of the original Irish that the several spelling variations have emerged, during the transcribing of the name into English. This is mainly due to the lack of literacy and ability to spell, which was common throughout Ireland at the time. Ó Neill replaced Ua Néill during the end of a standard Irish era.

== Coats of arms ==
It is a mistake to state that the Irish coat of arms system follows a feudal system wherein a coat of arms is property passed through direct lineage. This means that the right to use the arms is not restricted to a given individual, as in the English feudal system, but is open to all within the extended "sept" or "clan" of the Gaelic culture.

The coat of arms of the Uí Néill (plural of Ó Néill) of Ulster was white with a red left hand cut off below the wrist, palm facing down with the fingers spread. Today, it is more common to see the right hand, palm side up and with the fingers touching rather than the left, as the coat of arms was changed under British rule. It has also become a symbol of Ireland, Ulster, Tyrone, and other places associated with the ruling family of Uí Néills.

The symbol is frequently used by Protestant inhabitants since the 1920s in Northern Ireland. As other related family branches and clans loyal to the O'Neills were often granted or assumed a heraldic achievement, this red hand has been incorporated into the new coat of arms to the point of being a cliché.

The red hand is explained by several slightly differing legends, most of which tend to have a common theme beginning with a promise of land to the first man able to sail or swim across the sea and touch the shores of Ireland. Many contenders arrive, including a man named O'Neill, who begins to fall behind the others. Using his cunning, O'Neill cuts off his left hand and throws it onto the beach before the other challengers are able to reach shore, thus technically becoming the first of them to touch land and wins all of Ireland as his prize. However, the legends seem to originate in the seventeenth century, several many centuries after the red hand was already used by the O'Neill families.

== See also ==
- O'Neill (disambiguation)
- O'Neill dynasty
- Niall of the Nine Hostages
