= Irish nobility =

Historic hereditary titles in Ireland

The Irish nobility could be described as including persons who do, or historically did, fall into one or more of the following categories of nobility:

- Gaelic nobility of Ireland: descendants in the male line of at least one historical grade of king (Rí).
- Hiberno-Norman or Old English (Ireland) nobility: descendants of the colonisers who came to Ireland from Wales, Normandy and England after the Norman invasions of England and Ireland in 1066 and 1169–71, respectively.
- Peerage of Ireland, whose titles were created by the English and later British monarchs of Ireland in their capacity as Lord or King of Ireland.

These groups are not mutually exclusive. There is some overlap between the first two groups (prior to the Treaty of Limerick), and a lesser degree of overlap between the last two groups (prior to independence from the United Kingdom). Such overlaps may be personal (e.g. a Gaelic noble who was "regranted" his titles by King Henry VIII of England), or they may be geographical (i.e. different noble traditions co-existing in neighbouring parts of the country, which were only distinguished by the date when they finally fell under the Dublin Castle administration).

== Today ==
In the Republic of Ireland, the Irish Constitution precludes the State from conferring titles of nobility, and prevents citizens from accepting titles of nobility or honour – except with the prior approval of the government. Existing holders of aristocratic titles continue to use them, but they are not recognised by the Irish government.

While some representatives of clans and families had obtained "courtesy recognition" as Chiefs of the Name from the Chief Herald of Ireland, this practice was discontinued by 2003 – with the Attorney General noting that such recognitions were unconstitutional and without basis in law.

In Northern Ireland, as part of the United Kingdom of Great Britain and Northern Ireland, certain titles are still used and awarded.

== See also ==
- Irish genealogy
- Chief of the Name
- Irish House of Lords
