= Lists of Irish kings =

This page serves as an index of lists of kings of the Gaelic kingdoms of Ireland of the Early Medieval period.

- List of High Kings of Ireland
- Kings of Ailech
- Kings of Airgíalla
- Kings of Brega
- Kings of Breifne
- Kings of Ciannachta
- Kings of Clandeboye
- Kings of Conaille Muirtheimne
- Kings of Connacht
- Kings of Corco Modhruadh
- Kings of Dál nAraidi
- Kings of Dál Riata
- Kings of Déisi Muman
- Kings of Desmond
- Kings of Dublin
- Kings of East Breifne
- Kings of Eilne
- Kings of Fer Manach
- Kings of Iar Connacht
- Kings of Iarmuman
- Kings of Iveagh
- Kings of Leinster
- Kings of Loch Gabhar
- Kings of Luighne Connacht
- Kings of Magh Luirg
- Kings of Mide
- Kings of Munster
- Kings of Ormond
- Kings of Osraige
- Kings of Síol Anmchadha
- Kings of Sliabh Lugha
- Kings of Tara
- Kings of Thomond
- Kings of Tory
- Kings of Tír Chonaill
- Kings of Tír Eoghain
- Kings of Uí Cheinnselaig
- Kings of Uí Díarmata
- Kings of Uí Failghe
- Kings of Uí Fiachrach Aidhne
- Kings of Ui Fiachrach Muaidhe
- Kings of Uí Maine
- Kings of Uisnech
- Kings of Ulster
- Kings of Umhaill
- Kings of Waterford
- Kings of West Breifne

== See also ==
- List of Irish royal consorts
- List of Lords of Ireland – lists rulers of the Lordship of Ireland from 1171 to 1542
- List of Irish monarchs – lists sovereigns of the Kingdom of Ireland from 1542 to 1800 and the Irish Free State
- List of presidents of Ireland – lists heads of state of the Republic of Ireland
