= Shane (name) =

- Pronunciation: /ʃeɪn/ (shayn)
- Gender: Unisex

Origin
- Meaning: 'graced by God'
- Region of origin: Ireland

Other names
- Related names: O'Shane, O'Shea, Séamus, Seán or Sean, Shaine, Shauna, Shawna, Shay, Shayna, Shayne, Shania

Shane is a masculine given name. It is an anglicized version of the Irish male name Séaghan/Séan, which itself is cognate to the name John. Shane comes from the way the name Seán is pronounced in the Ulster dialect of the Irish language, as opposed to Shaun or Shawn.

Shane is sometimes used as a feminine given name but it is very rare.

Shane is also a popular surname with the prefix "Mac", "Mc", or "O'", to form anglicized Irish surname patronyms. The surname was first recorded in Petty's census of Ireland (1659), which lists a Dermot McShane (i.e., Son of Shane).

Variant forms include O'Shane, O'Shea, Séamus, Seán or Sean, Shaine, Shauna, Shawna, Shay, Shayna, and Shayne.

The name Shane was popularized by Jack Schaefer's novel Shane (1949) and its eponymous 1953 movie adaptation, directed by George Stevens from a screenplay by A.B. Guthrie Jr.

== Given name ==
=== Men ===
- Shane, New Zealand singer
- Shane Acker (born 1971), American filmmaker
- Shane Adams, Canadian Equestrian Team athlete
- Shane Aguirre (born 1972), American politician
- Shane Alexander, 2nd Earl Alexander of Tunis (born 1935), British peer
- Shane Armstrong (born 1999), American Artist, Filmmaker, Dancer
- Shane Austin (born 1989), American football player
- Shane Baker, American politician
- Shane Barr (born 1969), former professional tennis player from Australia
- Shane Battelle (born 1971), American soccer player
- Shane Battier (born 1978), American basketball player
- Shane Beamer (born 1977), American football coach and former player
- Shane Bergman (born 1990), Canadian football player
- Shane Bieber (born 1995), American baseball player
- Shane Black (born 1961), American filmmaker and actor
- Shane Bond (born 1970), New Zealand cricketer
- Shane Boose, (born 2005), American singer
- Shane Brathwaite (born 1990), is a hurdler from Barbados
- Shane Briant (1946–2021), British-Australian actor and novelist
- Shane Brolly (born 1970), Irish actor and writer
- Shane Buechele (born 1998), American football player
- Shane Byrne, multiple people
- Shane Cadogan (born 2001), Vincentian swimmer
- Shane Carr, Irish Gaelic footballer
- Shane Carruth (born 1972), American filmmaker
- Shane Carwin (born 1975), American mixed martial artist
- Shane Cassells (born 1978), Irish Fianna Fáil politician
- Shane Claiborne (born 1975), American Christian activist
- Shane Clipfell (born 1963), American basketball player and coach
- Shane Codd (born 1997), Irish DJ and record producer
- Shane Crawford (born 1974), Australian rules footballer
- Shane Crosse (born 2001), Irish jockey
- Shane Curran, multiple people
- Shane Dawson (born 1988), American YouTube comedian and actor
- Shane Doan (born 1976), Canadian ice hockey player
- Shane Dorian (born 1972), American professional surfer
- Shane Drohan (born 1999), American baseball player
- Shane Duffy (born 1992), Irish professional footballer
- Shane Drumgold (born 1965), Australian lawyer
- Shane Embury (born 1967), British bassist
- Shane Eugene Davis (1977–2014), American adult film actor and model
- Shane Filan (born 1979), Irish singer
- Shane Forster (born 1972), Northern Ireland Anglican priest
- Shane Garrett (born 1967), American football player
- Shane Gillis (born 1987), American comedian
- Shane Golobic (born 1991), American racing driver
- Shane Grice (born 1976), American football player
- Shane Hall (born 1969), American former professional stock car racing driver
- Shane Harper (born 1993), American actor, singer, and dancer
- Shane Heal (born 1970), Australian basketball player
- Shane Henry (born 1970), American ice hockey player
- Shane Hmiel (born 1980), American former racecar drive
- Shane Horgan (born 1978), Irish rugby union player
- Shane Hurlbut (born 1964), American cinematographer
- Shane Jacobson (born 1970), Australian actor, director, writer, and comedian
- Shane Jennings (born 2001), Irish rugby union player
- Shane Johnson, multiple people
- Shane Kenny (born 1947), Irish journalist and broadcaster
- Shane Kippel (born 1986), Canadian actor
- Shane Lee, multiple people
- Shane Lemieux (born 1997), American football player
- Shane Leslie (1885–1971), Irish-born diplomat and writer
- Shane Long (born 1987), Irish footballer
- Shane Lowry (born 1987), Irish professional golfer
- Shane Lynch (born 1971), Irish singer
- Shane MacGowan (1957–2023), Irish-English vocalist
- Shane Fumani Marhanele (born 1982), South African basketball player
- Shane Martin, multiple people
- Shane Matthews (born 1970), American football player
- Shane McConkey (1969–2009), American professional skier and BASE Jumper
- Shane McDonald (born 1985), Australian basketball player
- Shane McGrath, multiple people
- Shane McKenzie (born 1973), Australian bobsledder
- Shane McMahon (born 1970), American professional wrestling executive and wrestler
- Shane Meadows (born 1972), British film director
- Shane Meehan (born 2002), Irish hurler
- Shane Merritt (born 2000), Irish Gaelic footballer
- Shane Minor (born 1968), American country music artist
- Shane Murphy, multiple people
- Shane Mosley (born 1971), American boxer
- Shane Nelson, multiple people
- Shane Nicholson, multiple people
- Shane Niemi (born 1978), Canadian track and field athlete
- Shane Nigam (born 1995), Indian actor
- Shane O'Brien, multiple people
- Shane O'Connor, multiple people
- Shane O'Mara, multiple people
- Shane O'Neill, multiple people
- Shane O'Sullivan, multiple people
- Shane Oblonsky (born 1985), Canadian kickboxer
- Shane Owen (born 1990), Canadian ice hockey
- Shane Parker, multiple people
- Shane Pitter (born 1999), Jamaican bobsledder
- Shane Pow (born 1990), Singaporean actor
- Shane Reed (1973–2022), New Zealand aquathlete and triathlete
- Shane Richardson Reeves, 15th dean of the United States Military Academy
- Shane Reynolds (born 1968), American baseball player
- Shane Richie (born 1964), British actor and TV presenter
- Shane Rimmer (1929-2019), Canadian actor and voice artist
- Shane Roche, Gaelic footballer
- Shane Ronayne (born 1979), Gaelic football manager
- Shane Ross, former politician and Irish government minister
- Shane Ryan, multiple people
- Shane Sewell (born 1972), Canadian professional wrestler and referee
- Shane Smith, multiple people
- Shane Sparks (born 1974), American hip-hop choreographer
- Shane Stant (born 1971), the known assailant who attacked Nancy Kerrigan
- Shane Stringer, American politician
- Shane Sweetnam (born 1981), Irish equestrian
- Shane Taylor, multiple people
- Shane Thorne (born 1985), Australian wrestler
- Shane Tilton (born 1978), American media scholar
- Shane Tuck (1981–2020), Australian rules footballer
- Shane Tutmarc (born 1981), American singer/songwriter/producer
- Shane van Gisbergen (born 1989), New Zealand racing driver
- Shane Vereen (born 1989), American former professional football player
- Shane Victorino (born 1980), American baseball player
- Shane Walker, multiple people
- Shane Walsh, multiple people
- Shane Warne (1969–2022), Australian cricketer
- Shane Watson (born 1981), Australian cricketer
- Shane Webcke (born 1974), Australian rugby league footballer
- Shane West (born 1978), American actor
- Shane Williams (born 1977), Welsh rugby union player
- Shane Wiskus (born 1998), American gymnast
- Shane White (born 1970), American comic book artist
- Shane Woewodin (born 1976), Australian football player
- Shane Zylstra (born 1996), American football player

=== Women ===
- Shane Barbi (born 1963), American model
- Shane Bolks (born 1972), American writer
- Shane Collins, Multiple people
- Shane de Silva (born 1972), West Indian cricket player
- Shane Evans, Multiple people
- Shane Gould (born 1956), Australian swimmer
- Shane Kgoele (born 1964), South African judge
- Shane Pendergrass (born 1950), American politician

=== Fictional characters ===
- Shane, the eponymous hero of Jack Schaefer's novel (1949) and its 1953 film adaptation
- Shane, a marriageable NPC in the game Stardew Valley
- Shane-A112, a Spartan from the book Halo: Ghosts of Onyx
- Shane Barnstormer, the principal antagonist in the web series Video Game High School
- Shane Botwin, principal character in the TV series Weeds
- Shane Detorre, 10-year-old daughter of Frank Detorre in the movie Osmosis Jones
- Shane Donovan, a character in the NBC daytime soap opera Days of Our Lives
- Shane Dooiney, Locomotive Number 5 on the Culdee Fell Railway in The Railway Series by Wilbert Awdry
- Shane Gooseman, from The Adventures of the Galaxy Rangers
- Shane Falco, principal character in the film The Replacements
- Shane Hollander, a character in the Game Changers novel series and its television adaptation Heated Rivalry
- Shane McCutcheon, from The L Word
- Shane Morasco, from the daytime soap opera One Life to Live
- Shane Omen, a character in the film Mean Girls
- Shane Parrish, a character in the Australian soap opera Home and Away
- Shane Ramsay, from the Australian television soap opera Neighbours
- Shane Rebecchi, from the Australian television soap opera Neighbours
- Captain Shane Schofield, central character in Matthew Reilly's novels Ice Station, Area 7, Scarecrow, Scarecrow and the Army of Thieves, and the novella Hell Island
- Shane Vansen, in the TV series Space: Above and Beyond
- Shane Vendrell, a detective on the police drama television series The Shield
- Shane Walsh in The Walking Dead comic series
- Shane Wolfe, the protagonist of the 2005 Disney action comedy film The Pacifier

== Surname ==
Shane
- Pronunciation: shayn

Origin
- Origin: Ulster

Other names
- Variant forms: McShane; MacShane; O'Shane

- Shane Twins (born 1967), twin brothers Mike and Todd Shane, professional wrestlers
- Alex Shane (born 1979), British former wrestler
- Bob Shane (1934–2020), American singer and guitarist, founding member of The Kingston Trio
- C. Donald Shane (1895–1983), American astronomer
- Doug Shane, president of The Spaceship Company and Scaled Composites, and test pilot
- Elvie Shane (born 1988), American country music singer
- Jackie Shane (1940–2019), American soul and R&B singer and transgender pioneer
- John Shane (1822–1899), American politician, judge, and military officer
- Paul Shane (1940–2013), English actor
- Peter M. Shane (born 1952), American law professor
- Rita Shane (1936–2014), American operatic soprano
- Tom Shane, founder of the Shane Company
- William Rodger Shane (1935–2012), American politician

== See also ==
- MacShane, a surname
- McShane (name)
- Shain, surname with the same pronunciation
- Shayne (name)
- Sheen, name with a similar pronunciation
