= McShane =

McShane may refer to:

- McShane (name)
- McShane Bell Foundry, church bell manufacturer, located in Glen Burnie, Maryland, USA

== See also ==
- McShane's identity, geometric topology
- Shane (disambiguation)
- MacShane
- O'Shane
