= Hugh McShane O'Neill =

Irish leader (c.1575–c.1621)

- Prince of Tyrone, The MacShane of Glenconkeyne, Lord of Glenconkeyne
- Born: c. 1575; Glenconkeyne (modern County Londonderry), Ulster, Ireland
- Died: after 1621; Glenconkeyne (modern County Londonderry), Ulster, Ireland
- Family: O'Neill / MacShane
- Father: Con MacShane O'Neill
- Mother: Catherine/Julian Maclean
- Occupation: Prince, Chief of the MacShane O'Neill sept

Hugh McShane O'Neill (c. 1575 – after 1621) was an early modern Irish nobleman and rebel associated with the McShanes of Glenconkeyne and Killetra (modern south County Londonderry). This group was also called the "Wild Clan Shanes of Killetragh" or the "McShane-O'Neills". His parentage is disputed however he is claimed by some as being either a grandson or great-grandson of Conn O'Neill, 1st Earl of Tyrone, and Gearoid Mór Fitzgerald, 8th Earl of Kildare, and of the primary line of the O'Neill of Tyrone clan.

Hugh was an active rebel and commander in the 1580s through 1615. His first deed of historical note was a raid his brothers conducted on Maguire of Fermanagh and his lands in early 1573. They were stated to have done great damage to the lands of Maguire. The genealogy that states Hugh was the son of Shane "The Proud" O'Neill is based on his moniker and the fact that he is often in the company of other known sons of Shane O'Neill, collectively known across Ireland in the late 16th century as "The Mac Shanes". According to Scottish sources, he and his brothers Henry MacShane O'Neill and Art "MacShane" invaded Ireland with 3000 Scots from his cousin Lachlan MacLean in 1587. The link between the MacLeans and the MacShanes was close in that their mother was the daughter of Hector Mor, Chief of the MacLeans, and he and two other brothers had been secured with the MacLeans after the murder of their father, Shane in 1567. See O'Neill dynasty.

== The Nine Years' War ==
When his cousin Hugh O'Neill, Earl of Tyrone, went into rebellion in 1593 against Queen Elizabeth, Hugh and some of the McShanes put aside internal family fighting and joined their cousin the Earl. Others did not, and were eventually imprisoned by the Earl. During this war Hugh commanded a force of "200-foot and 50 Horsemen" raised out of the McShane Clan from forests of Killetragh and Glenconkeyn, then the most inhospitable and desolate forests in all of Ireland. Carew is quoted as stating that Hugh was able to field this force in 24 hours against the English. The State Papers of Ireland, in the various assessments of the strength of the rebellious Earl 1586 to 1602, state that this territory and the "woodkern race of outlaws" who lived there (the clan McShane) is considered primary to O'Neill, as it was his most secure refuge for cattle, goods, and people, and away from the military might of the English. Further, it was the Earl's secure, geographical "connection to the Clanaboy O'Neill". However, the Lord Lieutenant also lamented in 1599 that they (the English) should have "given Glenconkeyn to the sons of Shane, instead of the Earl". It was with Hugh and his McShanes that the Earl spent the final months of his rebellion in the winter of 1602–03. The Earl lived with the McShane-O'Neills after the Battle of Kinsale and the fall of Dungannon to Lord Mountjoy on the slopes of Sleive Gallion. Finally in March 1603, the Earl made peace.

== Internal O'Neill struggles ==
The struggles within the O'Neill family are well known. The Earl Hugh suppressed his own cousins more than he did the English in the first few years of his reign. In 1583 and 1587, the Earl put down any other claimants to the Chiefship, including Tirlough O'Neill, until he had himself recognised as Sir Tirlough Linneach's heir as The O'Neill Mor. In 1590, the Earl hung Hugh "Gaveloch", son of Shane O'Neill for conspiring against him. In 1593 the Earl had his cousin Phelim McTurlough, Lord of Loughinshollin and chief of a sept within the Clanaboy O'Neill, murdered on Toome on the Bann River, and instilled himself as the Lord of Loughinshollin.

Hugh and his McShanes were able to weather the rise of the Earl and had split loyalties to the Earl when fighting the English. However, with the loss of the Nine Years' War in 1603, Hugh McShane was able to edge out the Earl and became the new Lord of Killetragh and controlling most of the Lordship of Loughinshollin. He maintained independence from 1600 to 1606, and then replaced the Earl as the sole lord in the years following the Earl fleeing from Ireland in 1607. However, with the Flight of the Earls and the power vacuum that created, Hugh McShane and the other smaller lords had to deal with the sudden presence of the English military in Ulster. For a while, Hugh benefited from this independence. Sir Arthur Chichester put out a warrant for wanted rebels and in 1608 Hugh McShane, his brother Phelim, and Hugh's wild McShanes captured Shane Carragh O'Cahan in Glenconkeyn forest. They turned him over to Chichester for a pardon and remit of some leases for two years. In 1610 Hugh McShane was on the jury that divided the lands out of the forfeited estate of his cousin the Earl of Tyrone. In doing so Hugh received 1,000 acres (4.0 km^{2}) of the Earl's lands around Dungannon, and in 1611 another 120 acres (0.49 km^{2}) in Tyrone. Conn MacShane held an adjoining portion, and he and Henry both received large estates in Armagh and Fermanagh. Hugh's new neighbour and friend was the departed Earl's nephew Brian Crossagh, son of Sir Cormac MacBaron O'Neill, something that would cement a friendship impacting them both in later life.

== Later life ==
After his pardon in 1608, Hugh slipped back into the forests of Loughinshollin barony and held on to what power he could during the early years of the Plantation of the newly established County Londonderry. He was granted 120 acres (0.49 km^{2}) outside the ancestral home in Dungannon in 1611. As planters moved into the territories to the north, the combination of the dense forest and Hugh's reputation kept most new arrivals out. By 1615 he had lost his lands in Dungannon over a struggle with the Lord Lieutenant. Sir Thomas Phillips tried in vain from the small fort in Desertmartin to subdue the old Chief, but his strength with the McShanes was unmatchable with the local Irish, and he was never captured. He remained on his former lands, but eventually became known as a highwayman, controlling the forests and roads of southern Londonderry and the GlenShane pass.

In 1615 he, along with Brian Crossagh (son of Cormac MacBaron O'Neill), Rory O'Cahan, and Alexander McDonald (son of the Earl of Antrim), he was named by Lord Chichester as a primary conspirator in a planned rising known as "the Natives Rebellion". They were accused of fomenting a rebellion against the English and Scots planters, and planning the escape of the Earl of Tyrone's young son from a castle in Tyrone. Unlike the other conspirators, Hugh McShane was never captured and brought before the English. He escaped the gallows and died sometime after 1621 still in the forest. The last historical notation was an inquisition taken within Derry in 1621 that listed him as a "gentleman", referring to his status as a landowner.

== Sources ==
- The Londonderry Plantation 1609–1641, by T. W. Moody, pp. 51, 166;
- Plantation in Ulster, by George Hill, pp. 65, 250;
- County Londonderry Lands and Families in Northern Ireland, by George Hill, p. 425;
- Ireland Under the Tudors, by Richard Bagwell, p. 284;
- Tyrone's Rebellion, by Hyram Morgan, p. 18;
- The History of Ulster, by Ramsey Colles, p. 173;
- The Parishes of Kilrea, by J.W. Kernohan, p. 30;
- London and the Londonderry Companies, by Sir T. Phillips, 18 March 1614, pp. 47 & 58;
- Life and Time of Aodh O'Neill, by John Mitchel, p. 223;
- Calendar of the State Papers of Ireland, 1608–1610, p. 15;
- Calendar of the State Papers of Scotland 1657–1667, vol XI, p. 558:
- Moneyneena, A Hundred Years, Ballinascreen Historical Society, LondonDerry, June 2002, p. 7 and others
- "The Pedigree of O'Neill, Coat of Arms", Government Office-Republic of Ireland, M.S. No. 168, p. 138
