= McShane (name) =

- Pronunciation: /məkˈʃeɪn/ mək-SHAYN

Origin
- Origin: Ireland

Other names
- Variant forms: Shane, MacShane, Johnson

McShane is a patronymic surname originating in Ireland. Also appears in Scotland and England. The surname evolved from the given name Shane, a derivative of John, of Hebrew origin. Some of the earliest historical records regarding the surname are documented through Hugh McShane O'Neill of the royal O'Neill dynasty.

== History ==
The sept of MacShane–Johnson is a closely related branch of the Tyrone O'Neills. Its independent origins begin in the 16th century. There are English reports of a sept of the greater O'Neill dynasty known as the Clan Shanes living in the dense forest of Glenconkeyne and Killetragh dating back to the mid-16th century; and another in County Armagh that is related. When Shane O'Neill, Prince of Tír Eoghain and chief of all the O'Neill clans, was killed in 1567, he had more than ten male children from his various wives and girlfriends. As a group they were very young. During Shane's lifetime, he made claim to the patrimony of these children and thus they were raised in the courts of their various maternal grandfathers and aunts upon his death. These houses included the Gaelic noble families of O'Donnell, Maguire, MacDonald, and MacLean.

Sixteen years later in 1583, a confederation of the brothers met at the court of their uncle, the Chief of the MacLean clan in the Scottish isles. They were given an army of more than 2000 Scots to return to Ulster to attempt to retake their father's estate and title. When they invaded, the brothers took the English and the O'Neill chiefs by surprise and seized a large sphere of control in eastern Ulster, in alliance with the MacDonalds of Antrim. In an attempt to characterize them, the English began to refer to the group of brothers as "the Mac-Shanes" which in Gaelic was "the sons of Shane". For seven years they battled Sir Turlough O'Neill, the recognized O'Neill Mor at the time, and the rising Baron Dungannon and eventually Earl of Tyrone, Hugh Rua O'Neill. The brothers were dealt a blow in 1590 when the Earl of Tyrone captured and hung three of the men. The earl succeeded in capturing and imprisoning three more brothers over the remainder of the decade. By 1591 there were only two or three of the brothers free from the Earl. Two brothers, Hugh and Ever, were hiding out in the Glenconkeyne forest in eastern Tír Eoghain. They became field commanders within the O'Neill clan living there during the Nine Years' War. That sept had protected them as babies when their father had been killed nearby and had since been referred to as the Clan Shanes. The Clan Shanes were a boundary sept between the Clannaboy and Tyrone O'Neill lords.

In 1593, the Earl of Tyrone had their chief, Phelim mac Cormac Toole O'Neill, killed along the river Bann and seized the lordship away from the Clannaboy estate. The family turned to Hugh MacShane as their new leader and elected him as their chief. From that date forward, that O'Neill branch has used the "MacShane" surname as an honorific for their loyalty to Shane O'Neill and to his battling sons. Hugh MacShane reigned as Chief until 1620 and his sons and grandsons (Brian and Brian Og) were active in the wars and politics of Ulster, Ireland, and Spain for the next two centuries.

In spite of the Plantation of Ulster, and more specifically the newly created (1613) county of Londonderry, the McShanes felt little encroachment. This stemmed from two aspects that both worked toward their favor. The first was that the Livery Company from London assigned the land the McShanes lived on were the Drapers and the Skinners companies. Both of these companies were primarily concerned with money making and not in colonization. Thus, as long as the native Irish were willing to pay their rents, very few outsiders were moved onto the Livery Company lands, keeping the Glenconkeyne valley in the barony of Loughinsholin virtually Irish. Secondly, the fierce reputation and historical strength of the McShane family combined with the dense forest kept most planters from venturing into the forest. There are two proofs to this phenomenon. Fifty years after the plantation began, there were only six Protestant families living in the entire region. Secondly, Gaelic was spoken as the primary language until the mid-18th century and was still being taught in the local school as late as 1838. Virtually no other regions in Ulster maintained that level of native autonomy with regards to religion and language.

When the family was attainted as Irish Jacobites in the 1690s, the heir, Owen McShane, completely dropped any association with the O'Neill name in an attempt to hold his father's small estate. Though they had little effect in Glenconkeyne, the penal laws (1695–1745) and the influx of Scottish and English settlers into greater Ulster made it increasingly difficult for the Gaelic Irish to hold position and land within Irish society, and thus the name MacShane was eventually shortened to McShane by Owen's son Neil "Clochna" M'Shane, and then again during the 18th and early 19th centuries, Owen's great grandson Patrick translated the surname from the Gaelic "Mac Shane" which is the Ulster dialect spelling of "son of John" to the English "son of John" or Johnson. Johnson, and to a lesser extent Johnston, was commonly used in counties Tyrone, LondonDerry, and Armagh until roughly the 1920s. Over the 20th century, many of the Irish branches returned to the Gaelic spelling. This family is still active and viable in Ulster, America, and Australia. Concentrations of McShane/Johnson families around the world are in: County Londonderry & County Armagh, Northern Ireland; Glasgow, Scotland; Hobart, Australia; Cape Town, South Africa; Ontario, Canada; and Pennsylvania, USA. The family leadership is closely involved in the greater O'Neill clan activities.

A variety of the name is McShine, attested among black people is such Caribbean islands at Saint Vincent and Trinidad – who are apparently descended from the intermarriage of Scottish immigrants with local blacks and/or from slaves who had taken their master's surname with this variation.

== List of persons with the surname ==
- Andrew J. McShane (1865–1936), American, mayor of New Orleans
- Charlotte McShane, a Scottish born Australian triathlete
- Edward J. McShane (1904–1989), American mathematician
- Harry McShane (1891–1988), Scottish socialist and labor reformer
- Harry McShane (footballer) (1920-2012), Scottish football player
- Ian McShane (born 1942), English actor
- James J. P. McShane (1909–1968), US marshal – civil rights; Kennedy bodyguard
- James McShane (1833–1918), Canadian businessman and politician; mayor of Montreal
- Jamie McShane, American actor
- Jim McShane (1871–1946), Australian rules footballer
- Jimmy McShane (1957–1995), Northern Irish singer, known as the front-man of Italian musical act Baltimora
- Joe McShane (1868–1950), former Australian rules footballer
- John A. McShane (1850–1923), American politician
- Joseph M. McShane (born 1949), American, President of Fordham University and the University of Scranton
- Kitty McShane (1897–1964), Irish actress
- Lisa McShane, American biostatistician and oncologist
- Luke McShane (footballer) (born 1985), English footballer
- Luke McShane (born 1984), English chess player
- Michael J. McShane (born 1961), American judge
- Mike McShane (born 1947), ice hockey coach
- Mike McShane (born 1957), American actor and improvisational comedian
- Patrick McShane (1858–1903), Australian cricketer
- Paul McShane (born 1986), Irish football player
- Paul McShane (born 1989), English rugby league player
- Philip McShane (1932–2020), Irish mathematician
- Ryan McShane (born 1985), Northern Irish dancer

== See also ==
- Hugh McShane O'Neill, early documented McShane clan member
- O'Neill Dynasty
- MacShane
- Shane O'Neill

== Sources ==
- Church Lands of County Armagh, by Michael Glancy
- The Ancient and Royal Family of O'Neill, by Desmond O'Neill
- Royal Pardons: 1603, 1608, 1615
- Jury list of the Attaintment of the estate of the Earl of Tyrone, 1614
- Land Grant, County Tyrone, Ireland: 1615
- Calendar of the State Papers of Ireland, series for 1560 to 1660
- Hearth Rolls for County Londonderry, Ireland, 1660 to 1668
- Irish Army of King James II
- Stem of a Nation, Irish Pedigrees, by J. O'Hart
- Land Owners, Loughinshollin Barony, County Londonderry, 1740, Public Records Office of Northern Ireland (PRONI)
- Census of 1790 (PRONI)
- Rents List of 1813/1814, Loughinshollin Barony, Co. Londonderry, (PRONI)
- Tithe Roll of 1826, Ballinascreen Parish, Co. Londonderry, (PRONI)
- Tombstone Recordings of Ballinascreen Parish, Ballinascreen Historical Society
- Moneyneena, One Hundred Years, Ballinascreen Historical Society, June 2002
