= MacShane =

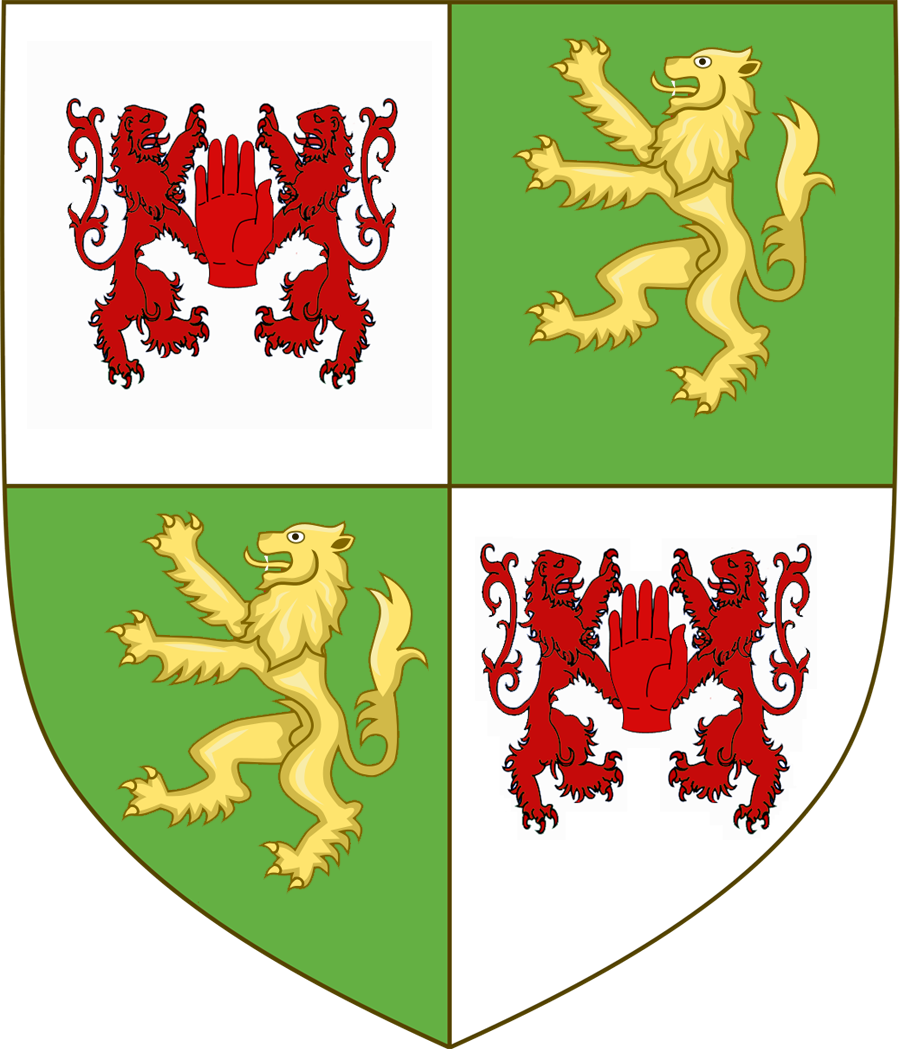
- Pronunciation: mac-SHAYN

Origin
- Meaning: Son of Shane
- Region of origin: Ireland

Other names
- Variant forms: McShain, Shane, McShane

MacShane or McShane is an Irish surname. It derives from the Gaelic Mac Seáin or Mac Seagháin and evolved from the given name Shane, a derivative of John. Historically, the MacShanes from Ulster are a branch of the O'Neills, while in County Kerry, the surname was adopted by the Fitzmaurices.

This surname was also the name given to the group of sons of Shane "An Diomas O'Neill", Prince of Ulster, Lord O'Neill, and Chief of all the O'Neill clans from 1558-1567. When he died, his ten or more sons were spread out among family within Ulster and Scotland. In the early 1580s they regrouped and for nearly a decade battled with their O'Neill cousins for dominance of Ulster and their father and grandfather's estate, the Earldom of Tír Eoghain. he English officials used the term "the Mac Shanes" (the sons of Shane) as an all encompassing term to describe many sons that made up this army in Ireland. Two specific families in Ireland, both descendants of Shane O'Neill, kept the nickname as a surname; the MacShanes in modern southern County Londonderry, and the MacShanes of Mayo.

== Sons of Shane ==
Shane had at least ten sons by his various wives. All of these ten are considered legitimate, but there may be others of a base origin. Many of them were later fostered in various O'Neill clans after their father's death, and eventually became the rival force to Hugh O'Neill in his climb to power in the 1580-1600 timeframe. His known sons are:

- Shane Og, mother was Catherine MacDonnell. He died in 1581 on a raid, was O'Neill tanist in 1579.
- Henry MacShane O'Neill, His mother was Catherine MacDonnell, he died 1622. Father of Sir Henry O'Neill and Con Boy McHenry. Perhaps the most famous of Shane's sons. Granted a large Estate in Orior County Armagh.
- Conn MacShane O'Neill, died in 1630. Mother was either the daughter of Shane og Maguire or Catherine MacLean, sources disagree. He invaded Ulster in 1583 with 3000 Scottish warriors and was named the Tanist of The O'Neill in the 1580s. During the 9 Years War, he fought against his cousin the Earl and was rewarded with a large estate (1500 acres) and the Manor lordship of Clabbye in Fermanagh. He played a part in Ulster politics until his death in 1630/1. His sons continued to serve in Ireland and abroad. Two of his grandsons were made Spanish Counts.
- Turlough, mother was Catherine MacDonnell of the Route. Died 1598.
- Hugh Gaveloch, died in 1590, most popular of the Mac Shanes. Led an army of Scots to invade Ulster to claim O'Neill Mór title. Retired and was captured and hung by his 1st cousin, the Earl of Tyrone.
- Naill, mother thought to have been Catherine O'Donnell.
- Art, mother was Catherine MacLean, died escaping from Dublin Castle with Red Hugh O'Donnell.
- Brian Laighneach, mother was Catherine MacLean, died after 1598.
- Edmond, died fighting against his cousin Hugh O'Neill, Earl of Tyrone.
- Hugh McShane O'Neill, mother was Catherine MacLean, died in 1621. Became Chief of the O'Neill sept inside Glenconkeyne forest and known from that point on as the "MacShanes". (Sources point to the fact that Hugh may have been the son of Conn Mac Shane).
- Cormac, mother was Catherine MacLean, died after 1603. Stayed with brother Hugh MacShane as did his son Cormac Boy.
- Rose married into the MacDonnell clan.

== See also ==
- Denis MacShane (born 1948), British politician
- John McShain (Born 21 December 1896) American contractor
- McShane (name)
- Johnson baronets of New York (1755), Anglo-Irish family (originally MacShane)
