= Gaffigan =

Gaffigan is a surname of Irish origin. It is an Anglicized form of the surname O’Gavigan and an alternate spelling of Gaughan, which in turn comes from Ó Gáibhtheacháin. Notable people with the surname include:

- James Gaffigan (conductor) (born 1979), American conductor
- Jeannie Gaffigan (born 1970), American actress, producer and comedy writer
- Jim Gaffigan (born 1966), American stand-up comedian, actor, writer, and producer

== See also ==
- Gavigan
- McGaffigan
