= Henry Oge O'Neill =

Henry Oge O'Neill, also spelt as Henry Og O'Neill (Irish: Enrí Og Ó Néill), may refer to:

- Henry Og O'Neill, son of Conn Mor O'Neill, king of Tyrone
- Henry Og MacShane, son of Henry MacShane O'Neill
