= Shayne (name) =

Shayne is an English language gender-neutral given name variant of the Irish given name Shane: variant of Sean, linguistically derived from the Hebrew given name John. Shayne is also an occasional surname. People with the name Shayne include:

== Given name ==
Shayne
- Pronunciation: SHAYN
- Gender: Unisex

Origin
- Origin: English language
- Meaning: "God is gracious"
- Region of origin: Ireland

Other names
- Related names: Shane, John

- M. Shayne Bell (born 1957), American author
- Shayne Bennett (born 1972), Canadian baseball pitcher
- Shayne Bower (died 2007), Canadian wrestler
- Shayne Bradley (born 1979), English footballer
- Shayne Breuer (born 1972), Australian footballer
- Shayne Burgess (born 1964), English darts player
- Shayne Carter (born c.1963), New Zealand musician
- Shayne Coplan (born 1998), American billionaire technologist
- Shayne Corson (born 1966), Canadian hockey player
- Shayne Culpepper (born 1973), American middle distance runner
- Shayne Elliott (born 1963/64), New Zealand banker
- Shayne Gostisbehere (born 1993), American hockey player
- Shayne Graham (born 1977), American football player
- Shayne Mallard (born c.1964), Australian politician
- Shayne McCosh (born 1974), Canadian ice hockey player
- Shayne Murphy (born 1952), Australian politician
- Shayne Neumann (born 1961), Australian politician
- Shayne O'Connor (born 1973), New Zealand cricketer
- Shayne Pattynama (born 1998), Indonesian footballer
- Shayne Stevenson (born 1970), Canadian ice hockey player
- Shayne-Feygl Szapiro (Dina Blond, 1887–1985), member of the Jewish Labour Bund in Poland and Yiddish translator
- Shayne Toporowski (born 1975), Canadian ice hockey player
- Shayne Topp (born 1991), American actor and comedian
- Shayne Ward (born 1984), English pop singer and actor
- Shayne Watson (born 1982), Australian baseball player and coach
- Shayne Lamas (born 1985), American actress

=== Fictional ===
- Shayne Lewis, a character on the American soap opera Guiding Light

== Surname ==
- Jonathan Shayne (born 1961), birth name of American country singer Merle Hazard
- Konstantin Shayne (1888–1974), Russian-American actor
- Maggie Shayne, American author
- Ricky Shayne (1944–2024), Egyptian-born pop singer and actor
- Robert Shayne (1900–1992), American actor

=== Fictional ===
- Michael Shayne, a private detective character in books written by Brett Halliday
- Reva Shayne, a character on the American daytime soap opera Guiding Light
- Héctor Belascoarán Shayne, a private detective character in books written by Spanish-Mexican author Paco Ignacio Taibo II

== See also ==
- Sean
- Shane (name)
- John (given name)
