= Oshane (disambiguation) =

Oshane may refer to:

== Places ==
- Oshane, a village in northwestern Bulgaria
- Oshane Glacier, a glacier in Antarctica named after the above

== People ==
=== Given name ===
- Oshane Bailey (born 1989), Jamaican sprinter
- Oshane Thomas (born 1997), Jamaican cricketer
- Oshane Ximines (born 1996), American football outside linebacker

=== Surname ===
- O'Shane, people with the surname
