= Hugh Gavelagh O'Neill =

Irish nobleman (died 1590)

Hugh Gavelagh MacShane O'Neill
- Born: c. 1562; Ireland
- Died: January 1590 (aged about 28); Dungannon, Ireland

Hugh Gavelagh MacShane O'Neill (Irish: Aodh Geimhleach mac Séan Ó Néill; c. 1562 (Note: Hugh Gavelagh was born when his mother was kept in chains, which was between 1561 and 1564.) – January 1590) was a sixteenth-century Irish noble of the O'Neill dynasty, specifically the MacShane branch. He was executed on the orders of his cousin the Earl of Tyrone.

== Family background ==
Gavelagh was one of the many sons of Gaelic chief Shane O'Neill. Shane had captured Catherine MacLean, wife of Calvagh O'Donnell, and made her his mistress. Their son gained the name Gavelagh, (Note: Also spelt Gavelach and Gavelock.) meaning "Fettered", because he was born while his mother was held captive in chains.

All of the MacShanes were fostered by the O'Donnelly clan, per Gaelic tradition.

Gavelagh's only full-brother was Art MacShane O'Neill. Art died from frostbite in early 1592, during his escape from imprisonment in Dublin Castle with Red Hugh O'Donnell and half-brother Henry MacShane O'Neill.

=== Succession dispute ===
The O'Neills were the most powerful Gaelic Irish clan of their time, but by the mid-to-late sixteenth century, they had fallen into internal conflict due to a succession dispute. The clan split into two major septs: the MacShanes (sons of Shane) and the MacBarons (sons of Matthew, Shane's reputedly illegitimate brother). Matthew was assassinated by Shane's followers in 1558; Shane was assassinated in 1567. Matthew's son, Hugh O'Neill, Earl of Tyrone, became a major rival to the MacShanes.

== Career ==
Gavelagh and Art could call upon substantial military support. They had access to Scots mercenaries through their cousin Lachlan Mor MacLean of Duart. Prior to 1584, they spent two years in Scotland soliciting MacLean's aid.

In the late 1580s, he became an informant for Lord Deputy William FitzWilliam.

In February 1589, Gavelagh arrived from Scotland; later he proceeded to Dublin where he made allegations against his cousin the Earl of Tyrone. Gavelagh reported to FitzWilliam that Tyrone had made treasonous dealings with Spanish noblemen of the Duke of Medina's fleet, who had escaped from the Armada. Tyrone had sent them into Scotland with letters to the King of Spain, in which he offered an alliance against Elizabeth I. The Spaniards had told this to Gavelagh, mistakenly thinking he was in Tyrone's confidence.

FitzWilliam and the Irish Council set out from Dublin for Stradbally, Ulster to question Tyrone. Tyrone denied the charge, alleging that Gavelagh was dangerous and untrustworthy. Gavelagh claimed he was ready to prove himself in single combat, but both he and Tyrone were forbidden to fight. Instead, Gavelagh agreed to produce witnesses, and a date was set for their testimony. After Tyrone gave bail and was released, he prevented Gavelagh from prosecuting his enquiries.

== Death ==
Gavelagh was captured by one of the Maguires, who then sold Gavelagh to Tyrone. The O'Donnelly clan offered large ransoms for their fosterbrother. They offered Tyrone 300 horses, and over 5,000 cows.

Tyrone disobeyed FitzWilliam's express command to send Gavelagh to Dublin as a prisoner, and in early January 1590, Gavelagh was executed on Tyrone's orders. At the time, it was alleged that Tyrone hanged MacShane over a tree with his bare hands. Conversely, Philip O'Sullivan Beare and William Parnell respectively claim the executioner was from Meath or Cavan - since Tír Eoghain's population still largely supported the MacShanes, no local man would agree to carry out the execution. John O'Hart stated that Gavelagh was hanged by Loughlin MacMurtogh and his brother, both natives of Fermanagh. 20th-century historian Robert Dunlop stated that "if [Tyrone] did not, as was asserted, hang [Gavelagh] with his own hands on a thorn tree, he procured a hangman from Cavan to execute him." Hiram Morgan stated conclusively that Gavelagh was hanged by the public executioners at Dungannon.

William Parnell states that, because the local population were sympathetic to the MacShanes, no-one from Tír Eoghain was willing to execute Gavelagh. 17th-century writer Philip O'Sullivan Beare stated that Tyrone had "a Meath-man acting as executioner" for this same reason.

Tyrone anticipated the charges against him, and proceeded to London where he sufficiently defended himself against England's Privy Council. The justification Tyrone gave was that Gavelagh was guilty of various robberies and murders. Tyrone thus re-entered the good graces of Elizabeth I.

Tyrone's defense to FitzWilliam probably involved bribery.

Tyrone was placed under house arrest but released by letters of commendation from FitzWilliam and the Dublin government.

Years later, it was claimed that William Warren had recommended Tyrone to hang Gavelagh.
