= People's Paper =

People's Paper could refer to:

- Folkstsaytung, jewish newspaper
- Tribune (Australian newspaper), Initially it was subtitled as Tribune: The People's Paper
- Notes to The People (1850–1852), a newspaper founded by Ernest Charles Jones a leader in the Chartist movement.
- People's Paper (1852-), a Chartist movement newspaper
- The People's Paper, newspaper published in Charlotte, North Carolina (1896–1903)
- The People's Paper, newspaper published in Warrenton, North Carolina (1895–1896)
- The People's Paper, newspaper published in Concord, North Carolina (1879–1879)
