= McGaffigan =

McGaffigan is a surname. Notable people with the surname include:

- Andy McGaffigan (born 1956), American baseball player
- Patsy McGaffigan (1888–1940), American baseball player

== See also ==
- Gaffigan
