= Shane Martin (disambiguation) =

Shane Martin (born 1971) is an American senator.

Shane Martin may also refer to:

- Shane Martin (cricketer) (born 1973), an Australian professional cricketer
- George Johnston (novelist) (1912–1970), an Australian journalist, war correspondent and novelist who writes under the pseudonym Shane Martin
- Shane Martin (1967–2021), a former bikie and the father of Australian rules footballer Dustin Martin
