= Shayna =

Shayna (Yiddish: שיינא;שיינה; Polish: Szejna) or Shaina is a feminine name of Yiddish origin, meaning "beautiful" or "lovely" (Yiddish: שיין (sheyn), cognate with modern German schön), and evocative of the Yiddish phrase "אַ שיינע מיידל" ("a shayne maydel", or "a lovely girl"). Its Hebrew equivalent is Yaffa (יפה) or Yafit (יַפִית); during the years following the Holocaust, the name Shayna (and its Arabic cognate, Jamila) was often Hebraicized to Yaffa upon immigrating to Israel or, outside Israel, as a post-Holocaust distancing of diasporic heritage.

== People named Shaina or Shayna ==
- Shaina Amin, Bangladeshi actress and also a model
- Shaina Fewell, American writer and producer
- Shaina Magdayao, (born 1989) Filipina actress, dancer, singer and model
- Shaina NC (born 1972), Indian fashion designer, politician, and social worker
- Shaina Nitura (born 2004), Filipina volleyball player
- Shaina Pellington (born 1999), Canadian basketball player
- Shaina Sandoval, (born 1992) American actress
- Shaina Taub (born 1988), American actress, singer, musician, and composer
- Shayna Baszler (born 1980), martial artist
- Shayna Fox (born 1984), American voice actress
- Shayna Hubers (born 1991), perpetrator of the murder of Ryan Poston
- Shayna Jack (born 1998), Australian swimmer
- Shayna Levy (born 1997), American-born Israeli footballer
- Shayna McHayle (born 1991), American rapper and actress
- Shayna Nackoney (born 1982), synchronized swimmer
- Shayna Powless (born 1994), American professional racing cyclist
- Shayna Rose (born 1983), soap opera actress
- Shayna Small, American actor, musician, and audiobook narrator
- Shayna Stahl, director of the Wildcat Marching Band
- Shayna Steele (born 1975), American singer, songwriter and actress
- Shayne-Feygl Szapiro (Szejne Fejgl Szapiro-Michalewicz, Dina Blond, 1887-1985), member of the Jewish Labour Bund in Poland and a prolific Yiddish translator

== Fictional Characters ==
- Shaina Alston, character from the American television series, Gullah Gullah Island
- Shaina Khanna, main character from the film, Raaz: Reboot
- Shaina McKlank, character from the American horror franchise, Final Destination
- Shaina Mehra, main character from the film, Kick
- Shaina Raghuvanshi, character from the television series, Qayaamat Se Qayaamat Tak
