= Shane O'Neill =

Shane O'Neill may refer to:

- Shane O'Neill (Irish chieftain) (c. 1530–1567), head of the O'Neill clan of Ulster who fought the forces of Queen Elizabeth I
- Shane O'Neill (Cork hurler) (born 1986), Irish hurler
- Shane O'Neill (Limerick hurler) (born 1974), Irish hurling manager and player
- João O'Neill (died 1788), also known as Shane O'Neill, head of the Clanaby O'Neill dynasty
- Shane O'Neill (tattoo artist) (born 1972), American tattoo artist
- Shane O'Neill, 3rd Earl of Tyrone (1599–1641), son of Hugh O'Neill, Earl of Tyrone
- Shane O'Neill (soccer) (born 1993), American soccer player
- Shane O'Neill (skateboarder) (born 1990), Australian professional skateboarder
- Shane O'Neill, 3rd Baron O'Neill (1907–1944), Anglo-Irish peer and British Army officer

== See also ==
- Shane O'Neill's GAC, a GAA club from Camlough, County Armagh
