= Shane Smith =

Shane Smith may refer to:

- Shane Smith (baseball) (born 2000), American baseball player
- Shane Smith (drummer) (born 1979), Canadian drummer
- Shane Smith (horticulturist) (born 1954), author, lecturer, and director of the Cheyenne Botanic Gardens
- Shane Smith (journalist) (born 1969), Canadian journalist and web entrepreneur
- Shane Smith (producer), Australian-Canadian film festival programmer and television producer
- Shane Smith (American football) (born 1993), American football player
- Shane Smith and The Saints, an American red dirt country band from Austin, Texas

== See also ==
- Shayne Smith (disambiguation)
