= Shain =

Shain may refer to:

== Places ==
- Shain, alternate name of Hashatjin, a city in Ardabil Province, Iran

== People ==
- Charles Alexander Shain (1922–1960), Australian astronomer
- Eva Shain (1918–1999), American boxing judge
- Irving Shain (1926–2018), American academic
- Jon Shain (born 1967), American folk musician
- Merle Shain (1935–1989), Canadian author and journalist
- Milton Shain, (born 1949), South African historian
- Ruchoma Shain (1914–2013), American teacher and author
- Yossi Shain (born 1956), Israeli academic and politician
- Shaïn Boumedine (born 1996), French actor

== See also ==
- Shaina
- Shein (disambiguation)
