= Shayne Smith =

Shayne Smith may refer to:

- Shayne Smith (comedian) (born 1986), American stand-up comedian
- Shayne Smith (footballer) (born 1975), Australian rules footballer

== See also ==
- Shane Smith (disambiguation)
