= O'Neill dynasty =

Group of families prominent in Ireland, elsewhere

O'Neill Ó Néill
- Parent house: Cenél nEógain
- Founded: Late 10th century
- Founder: Flaithbertach Ua Néill
- Current head: By sept Chief
- Final ruler: Hugh O'Neill, Earl of Tyrone
- Titles: High Kings of Ireland; Kings of Tara; Kings of Ulster; Kings of Ailech; Kings of Tyrone; Sept titles: O'Neill Mór; O'Neill of Tyrone; O'Neill of Clandeboye; O'Neill of the Fews; International titles: Dux Hibernicorum; King of Ulster; Prince of Tyrone; Prince of Clanaboy; Prince of the Fews; Earl of Tyrone; Count of Tyrone; Marquis del Norte; Viscount O'Neill; Viscount of Santa Mónica; Marquis de la Granja; Baron Dungannon; Baron O'Neill of Shane's Castle; Baron Rathcavan; Baroness O'Neill of Bengarve; Baron O'Neill of Clackmannan; Baron O'Neill of Gatley; O'Neill baronets

The O'Neill dynasty (Irish: Ó Néill) are a lineage of Irish Gaelic origin that held prominent positions and titles in Ireland and elsewhere. As kings of Cenél nEógain, they were historically one of the most prominent family of the Northern Uí Néill, along with the O'Donnell dynasty. Some O'Neills state that their ancestors were kings of Ailech during the Early Middle Ages, as descendants of Niall of the Nine Hostages.

Two of their progenitors were High Kings of Ireland: Niall Glúndub (from whom they take their name) and Domnall ua Néill. From 1232 until 1616, the O'Neills were sovereign kings of Tír Eógain, holding territories in the north of Ireland in the province of Ulster, particularly around modern County Tyrone, County Londonderry and County Antrim, in what is now Northern Ireland. After their territory was merged with the Kingdom of Ireland and the land was caught up in the Plantation of Ulster, they were involved in a number of events, such as Tyrone's Rebellion, the Flight of the Earls, the Irish Rebellion of 1641 and the Irish Confederate Wars.

== Naming conventions ==
Male	Daughter (long)	Daughter (short)	Wife (long)	Wife (short)
Ó Néill	Iníon Uí Néill	Ní Néill	Bean Uí Néill	Uí Néill

== Origins ==
The O'Neill lineage claims descent from Niall Glúndub, a 10th-century king of Ailech as well as High King of Ireland. Niall was descended from the Cenél nEógain branch of the Northern Uí Néill. The first to adopt the patronymic surname was Niall Glúndub's great-grandson, Flaithbertach Ua Néill.

The clan is not mentioned in the Annals of Ireland between the 1080s and 1160s, during which period they emerged from a "very murky background". In 1167, King Ruaidrí Ua Conchobhair of Ireland marched north and split the kingdom of Ailech into two areas. The portion north of Slieve Gallion was given to Niall Mac Lochlainn (McLaughlin), with the portion south of Slieve Gallion given to Áed Ua Néill. The two rival dynasties contested for control over Tír Eoghain until the battle of Caimeirge in 1241, where the O'Neills killed the MacLoughlin leadership.

== O'Neills of Tyrone ==
After 1241, the O'Neill house dominated and displaced other clans, using the disruption of the Norman invasion of Ireland in 1169 to their benefit and consolidating power. The Bruce Invasion of Ireland devastated the Norman Earldom of Ulster, which held sway over eastern Ulster and most of its north coast all the way to Derry. Its collapse in 1333 allowed a branch of the O'Neill that had been on good terms with the Normans, Clandeboye, to step into the power vacuum and take control over large parts of eastern Ulster.

In 1493, Henry VII of England referred to Henry O'Neill, King of Tyrone, as "the Chief of the Irish Kings" and gave him a gift of livery.

The earldom of Tyrone was eventually granted in 1542.

After nearly a decade of warfare with the English forces in Ireland, Hugh O'Neill, Earl of Tyrone, surrendered in 1603, just days after the death of his enemy Queen Elizabeth. Hugh stayed in Ulster as the Earl for another five years. But after numerous threats to his life, he secretly departed Ireland for the French coast in 1607 in what is famously called the Flight of the Earls. Hugh continued to use his title after he fled to the Continent in the Flight of the Earls, although in the law of the Kingdom of Ireland it was forfeit by act of the Irish Parliament a year later. So did his son Shane O'Neill, whose will left his title to his only, if illegitimate, son Hugo Eugenio O'Neill; when he died in 1641 at the head of his regiment in Spain. Other Spanish exiled descendants of Hugh Rua continued to use the title and command the Ulster Irish Regiment in the Spanish Army through the seventeenth century.

== O'Neills of Clanaboy ==
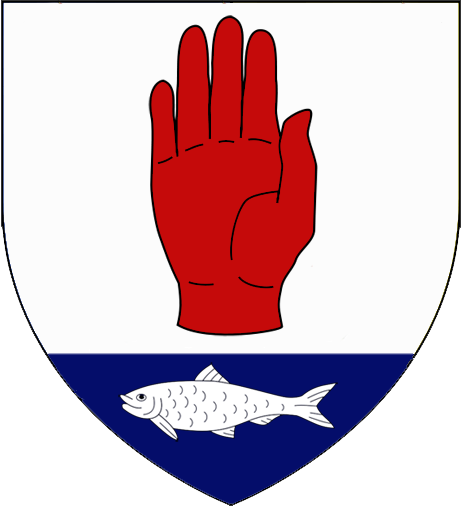
O'Neill of Clanaboy.

"The descendants of Prince Con MacBryan O'Neill, Tanist of Clanaboy, remained loyal, under every vicissitude, to the traditions of their house, and saved little out of the general wreck of confiscation. They seemed to have preferred fulfilling the solemn pledge of their ancestor, Donald O'Neill, King of Ulster, to 'fight out as long as life should last' rather than adapt themselves to altered circumstances, as the descendants of Shane MacBryan had wisely done," according to Burke's Peerage.

== O'Neill descendants in France, Spain, and Portugal ==
In the beginning of the 18th century Felix O'Neill: senior male in linear descent of the line of Brian Ballach O'Neill, and Niall Mór O'Neill's second eldest son, was dispossessed of all his estate through the confiscation applied via the Penal Laws, which led him to immigrate to France. He was a cavalry officer who took part in many battles with the Irish Brigade of the French Army. He fought with the French against the British, the Austrians, and the Dutch (during the War of the Spanish Succession), in the celebrated Battle of Malplaquet, where he died on 11 September 1709.

In 1896 Jorge O'Neill of Portugal, paternal nephew of the 1st Viscount of Santa Mónica, submitted his genealogy to the Somerset Herald in London. Five years later, Sir Henry Farnham Burke, KCVO, CB, FSA, Somerset Herald stated in 1900 that "the only Pedigree at present on record in either of the Offices of Arms showing a lineal male descent from the House of O'Neill, Monarchs of Ireland, Kings of Ulster, and Princes of Tyrone and Claneboy, is the one registered in the fifty-ninth year of the Reign of Our Sovereign Lady Victoria, in favor of His Excellency Jorge O'Neill of Lisbon". He then recognized him as the Representative of the House of O'Neill and as the Representative of the Earldom created in 1542 for his kinsman Conn Baccagh O'Neill. All of this was granted under Letters Patent issued by the English College of Heralds. Later, the Ulster and Norroy King of Arms granted him the undifferenced arms as the head of the House of O'Neill. Upon that Letters Patent, Pope Leo XIII, the King of Spain, and the King of Portugal all recognized Jorge O'Neill as the Prince of Clanaboy, Tyrone, Ulster, as the Count of Tyrone, and the Head of the Royal House of O'Neill and all of its septs. It was from this grant that the Chief Herald of Ireland recognized the family as the Princes of Clannaboy in 1945. The grandson of Jorge and present Prince of Clanaboy, Hugo, has not pressed his senior claim to the entire House of O'Neill out of respect for his O'Neill chief cousins and their own histories.

== O'Neills of Shane's Castle ==
The castle at Edenduffcarrick, now called Shane's Castle, has long been a key family site for the Clannaboy clan of O'Neills. Shane MacBrien O'Neill changed its name to Shane's Castle in 1722. After the Plantation of Ulster, some O'Neill families converted to the Church of Ireland and began to intermarry with the new nobility coming from England. One such union was between Mary O'Neill, the daughter of Henry O'Neill the lord of Shane's Castle, and Arthur Chichester. It is through this marriage that the present day Barons of Shane's Castle trace their lineage to the royal family of O'Neill.

The present day title of Baron O'Neill of Shane's Castle is a title in the Peerage of the United Kingdom. It was created in 1868 for the musical composer Reverend William O'Neill. Born William Chichester, he succeeded to the estates of his cousin John Bruce Richard O'Neill, 3rd Viscount O'Neill, in 1855 (on whose death the viscountcy and barony of O'Neill became extinct) and assumed by Royal licence the surname of O'Neill in lieu of Chichester in order to inherit the lands of his cousin, despite not being descended in the male line from an O'Neill, daughter of Henry O'Neill of Shane's Castle. Lord O'Neill was the patrilineal great-great-great-grandson of John Chichester, younger brother of Arthur Chichester, 2nd Earl of Donegall. The latter two were both nephews of Arthur Chichester, 1st Earl of Donegall, and grandsons of Edward Chichester, 1st Viscount Chichester (see the Marquess of Donegall for more information). Lord O'Neill was succeeded by his eldest son, the second Baron. He sat as a Conservative Member of Parliament for Antrim.

== O'Neills of the Fews ==
"The Fews" is an area in County Armagh, Northern Ireland, that was a sub-territory under the O'Neills of Tyrone. This O'Neill branch is related to the O'Neill of Tyrone through King Eoghan Mor, circa 1432–1436. The king's younger son Aodh (Hugh) pushed into the territory known as the Fews and founded a lordship there based largely on the unlawful confiscation of considerable amounts of land belonging to the archbishop of Armagh. In the rebellion of 1642, Sir Henry O'Neill, a member of the Fews O'Neills, sided with the English crown while his sons and brothers played a prominent part in the rising. Despite his choice of sides his lands were confiscated and divided among a number of Cromwellian settlers. The chief beneficiary was Thomas Ball, whose grants totalled more than 6,000 acres (24 km^{2}). Sir Henry O'Neill was banished to Connacht, to land in County Mayo, Ireland. Exiled with him was his son Captain Sean/Shane O'Neill. Shane's sons took the surname MacShane, or son of Shane. His grandson William anglicized the name to Johnson. He was a major-general in the American Colonial Army and fought the French at Niagara, New York in French-Indian War. For his significant victory he was granted a baronetcy and made Sir William Johnson, 1st Baronet of New York in 1753. The present holder of that estate is Sir Colpoys Johnson, 8th Baronet of New York.

When the Williamite War began in Ireland in 1689, Sir Henry O'Neill's son Turlough was dead and so was Turlough's son Con. The heir to the family's Mayo estate was Con's son Henry, who was a minor and had been sent to France for his education. Despite their non-participation in the war, the O'Neill estates were seized by the Crown. Henry (1676-1745) should subsequently have recovered the confiscated lands; his relatives on the continent feared to send him back to Ireland to stake his claim and the property went by default and was sold in 1702–3. Henry had a heroic career in the French army, rising to become a Lieutenant-Colonel in the Regiment of Clare. He was killed at the Battle of Fontenoy in May 1745, aged 69. Henry was the last undisputed claimant to the lordship of the Fews.

Some O'Neill families today claim descent from this Henry O'Neill, but contemporary documentation show that he died without leaving any descendants. Following Henry's death, Felix O'Neill (c1720-1792) was identified by contemporaries as the "person to whom the Lordship of the Fews in the North of Ireland in right and justice belongeth". Indeed, Felix was considered to have a valid claim to be the Chief of the entire O'Neill clan. In his book "History of Ireland" (1758–62) Abbé James MacGeoghegan of the Irish College in Paris wrote of the house of the O'Neills that "the present representative is Felix O'Neill, the chief of the house of the Fews, and an officer of rank in the service of his Catholic Majesty".

Felix O'Neill was born in Creggan in County Armagh. He descended from Aodh Buidhe O'Neill, brother of Sir Henry O'Neill. Felix left Ireland for a career in the Spanish Army and is well remembered for his rescue of Charles Edward Stuart ("Bonnie Prince Charlie") following the Battle of Culloden. Felix became a lieutenant general in the Spanish Army and his four sons in turn all had honourable careers in the Spanish military. While most of them did not marry and have families, the youngest son Juan O'Neill (1768-1809) married Vincenta Gual y Vives de Cananas from Palma, Mallorca, and took up residence on the island. Having attained the rank of Captain-General, he died aged 40 leaving a son Felix who was only a year old. Through this man the O'Neills of the Fews line continued in Mallorca in the 19th century and in Argentina in the 20th century. The current day Argentinean descendants of Lieutenant General Felix O'Neill therefore have an historical claim to be leaders of this branch of the O'Neill dynasty. In the 2000s, Dr. Tulio José O'Neille of Buenos Aires in Argentina has come to light as the genealogically senior living heir of the O'Neill of the Fews. His grandfather moved from Spain and he is descended from Lt. Gen Felix O'Neille (1 November 1720 — 12 July 1792), from the Creggan, who serve in the Spanish Army, serving at times at Captain General of Aragon and Galicia.

A contrary claim to the leadership of the dynasty comes from Spanish nobleman Don Carlos O'Neill, 12th Marquis de la Granja, who has been described as "the Prince of the Fews". He claims direct descent from the last undisputed "Lord of the Fews" Henry O'Neill although contemporary evidence shows that Henry had no descendants. While the family's precise link to the historical O'Neills of the Fews therefore remains unclear, their descent can be traced back to a certain 'Red' Henry O'Neill and his wife Hanna née O'Kelly, the daughter of counselor John O'Kelly of Keenagh, County Roscommon, whose children relocated to Spain in the 1750s and 1760s.

Henry and Hanna O'Neill became the parents of Arthur O'Neill in 1736. He was born in Dublin, Ireland. He joined the Spanish army in 1752 and was known by the name Don Arturo O'Neill de Tyrone. He served over 20 years in the Spanish colonial service, becoming Governor of Yucatan in October 1792, and later Governor of West Florida. On his return to Spain in 1803 he was appointed to the Supreme Council of War (replacing Governor Miguel de Uztaraiz) and was awarded the title of the 1st Marques Del Norte two years later. Arturo's brothers included Lieutenant-Colonel Niall 'Nicolas' O'Neill y O'Kelly who died at Zaragoza in Spain, and Tulio and Enrique O'Neill y O'Kelly who both relocated to the Caribbean island of St. Croix in the footsteps of a deceased uncle. These two brothers were granted a license by the Spanish crown to create sugar plantations on the island of Puerto Rico in 1783, although they never availed of it.

Tulio O'Neill y O'Kelly married Catherine O'Keefe y Whalen and became the parents of Arturo O'Neill y O'Keefe and Tulio O'Neill y O'Keefe. Don Arturo O'Neill y O'Keefe was born in March 1782 on St. Croix and married Joanna Chabert Heyliger there in April 1802. Arturo and his brother pleaded for permission to take up their father's right to land in Puerto Rico and this was granted in 1804. Arturo moved his family there in March 1810 and his descendants continue to reside there today as well as in Spain and the USA. Arturo became a Lieutenant Colonel on 17 August 1828 in Bayamón, Puerto Rico and inherited the title of Marques Del Norte from his uncle. He died on 7 September 1832 and is reportedly buried in the Roman Catholic Church of Frederiksted, Saint Croix.

Tulio O'Neill y O'Keefe was born on St. Croix in September 1784. He became a general in the Spanish army and won distinctions during the Peninsular War fighting the French. He married Manuela de Castilla Quevedo, the daughter of a Spanish noble family, in 1819. However, she died shortly after the birth of their son, Juan Antonio Luis O'Neill de Castilla. O'Neill y O'Keefe was promoted to field marshal of the Royal Guard in 1828 and it was he who made the public announcement of the birth of a daughter to the King in 1830, namely the future Isabel II of Spain. O'Neill y O'Keefe died in 1855 and the family line was continued through his son who inherited his mother's titles (the Marquis de la Granja, the Marquis de Caltojar, the Marquis de Valdeosera and the Count of Benajiar). A later descendant of his also took the title of Marques Del Norte that had remained unclaimed by their relations in Puerto Rico. This branch of the family is often referred to as the O'Neills of the Fews of Seville and is currently headed by the Spanish nobleman Don Carlos O'Neill. Any claim of theirs to represent the O'Neills of the Fews dynasty however must be viewed in light of their descent from the junior branch of the O'Neill y O'Keefe family as well as the absence of a proven lineage linking to the historical "Lords of the Fews". The reservation as to clan leadership being made by a junior branch is debatable as Irish inheritance and Spanish inheritance follow different laws.

== MacShane O'Neills ==
The sept of McShane is a closely related branch of the Tír Eoghain O'Neills. When Shane O'Neill, Prince of Tyrone and chief of all the O'Neill clans, was killed in 1567, he had an estimated ten male children from his various wives and mistresses. As a group they were very young. During Shane's lifetime, he made claim to the legitimate patrimony of these children and thus they were raised in the courts of their various maternal grandfathers and aunts upon his death. These houses included the Gaelic noble families of O'Donnell, Maguire, O'Quinn, MacDonald, and MacLean. Sixteen years later in 1583 a confederation of the brothers met at the court of their uncle, the Chief of the MacLean clan in the Scottish isles. They were given an army of more than 2000 Scots to return to Ulster to attempt to retake their father's estate and title. When they invaded the brothers took the English and the O'Neill chiefs by surprise and created a large sphere of control in eastern Ulster, allied with the MacDonald's of Antrim. In an attempt to characterize them, the English began to refer to the group of brothers as "the Mac-Shanes" which in Gaelic meant "the sons of Shane". For seven years they battled Sir Turlough O'Neill, the recognized O'Neill Mor at the time, and the rising Baron Dungannon and eventually Earl of Tyrone, Hugh Rua O'Neill. The brothers were dealt a blow in 1590 when the Earl of Tyrone captured and hanged three of the brothers. The earl succeeded in capturing and imprisoning another three over the remainder of the decade until there were only two possibly three of the brothers and nephews hiding out in the Glenconkeyne forest in eastern Tyrone. Two sons of Con MacShane O'Neill, Hugh and Ever, became chief raiders within the O'Neill clan living there. That family had saved them as babies when their father had been killed nearby and had since been referred to as the Clan Shanes. In 1593, the Earl of Tyrone had the Clan Shane's chief killed and the family turned to Hugh MacShane as their new leader. Hugh was elected as their chief, and that O'Neill branch has since forth taken on the "MacShane" surname as an honorific for their loyalty to Shane O'Neill and to his battling sons. Hugh McShane O'Neill reigned as chief until 1622 and his sons and grandsons served as the chieftains of the family and were active in the wars and politics of Ulster, Ireland, and Spain for the next two centuries.

Some of Shane's surviving son's were given sizable land after the flight of the earls that had previously belonged to Hugh O'Neill. Henry was given land in Orior, Con was given the estate of Clabbye, and Brian was given land in Clinawly, Fermanagh. Brian's son Edmond was granted control of Lisdawericke, Megin, Cnoghan, Tollohiny Dirrilghta, Knockmcgallcrum & Gortnesillagh. Henry's son Cormocke (Cormac) was given land. This spread the clan throughout the province and lessened their influence. Brian, son of Hugh, the Chief of the McShane O'Neills led the clan in the 1642 Rising, the Irish Confederate Wars, and fought against Oliver Cromwell's Army through the death of his 2nd cousin Owen Roe O'Neill in 1649 and the victory of Cromwell in 1653. Brian remained in Spanish exile until 1666. Two decades later, his son the new Chief, Brian Og (the Younger) led the clan in service of the O'Neill regiments supporting King James II. After the defeat of the Jacobite forces, the family was "attainted" as Irish rebels in 1693, and Brian "Og" left with the Army of King James II and went into exile in France. The eventual heir, Owen McHugh O'Neill, completely dropped any association with the O'Neill name, and just took McShane as a surname due to the Irish Penal Laws, in an attempt to hold his father's small estate.

After the fall of the O'Neill kingship, many MacShanes followed their cousins into military service in Spain and France and even served in the Irish regiments with their family and former enemies, the descendants of Hugh Rua O'Neill, the 2nd Earl. By the end of the 17th century, the Earl's line failed in exile, and the "Mac Shane" line legally inherited the chiefship and title. This line is presently in remainder to the Gaelic Principality and Earldom of Tyrone, the Viscountcy of Montjuich, and various lordships around Ulster. Further, with the Oireachtas act of March 2015, which reversed the Attainder of Shane O'Neill from 1569, the family have the recognized legal rights to the historical legacy and incorporeal property of Conn Bacach O'Neill, Shane the Proud, and Hugh O'Neill, Earl of Tyrone.

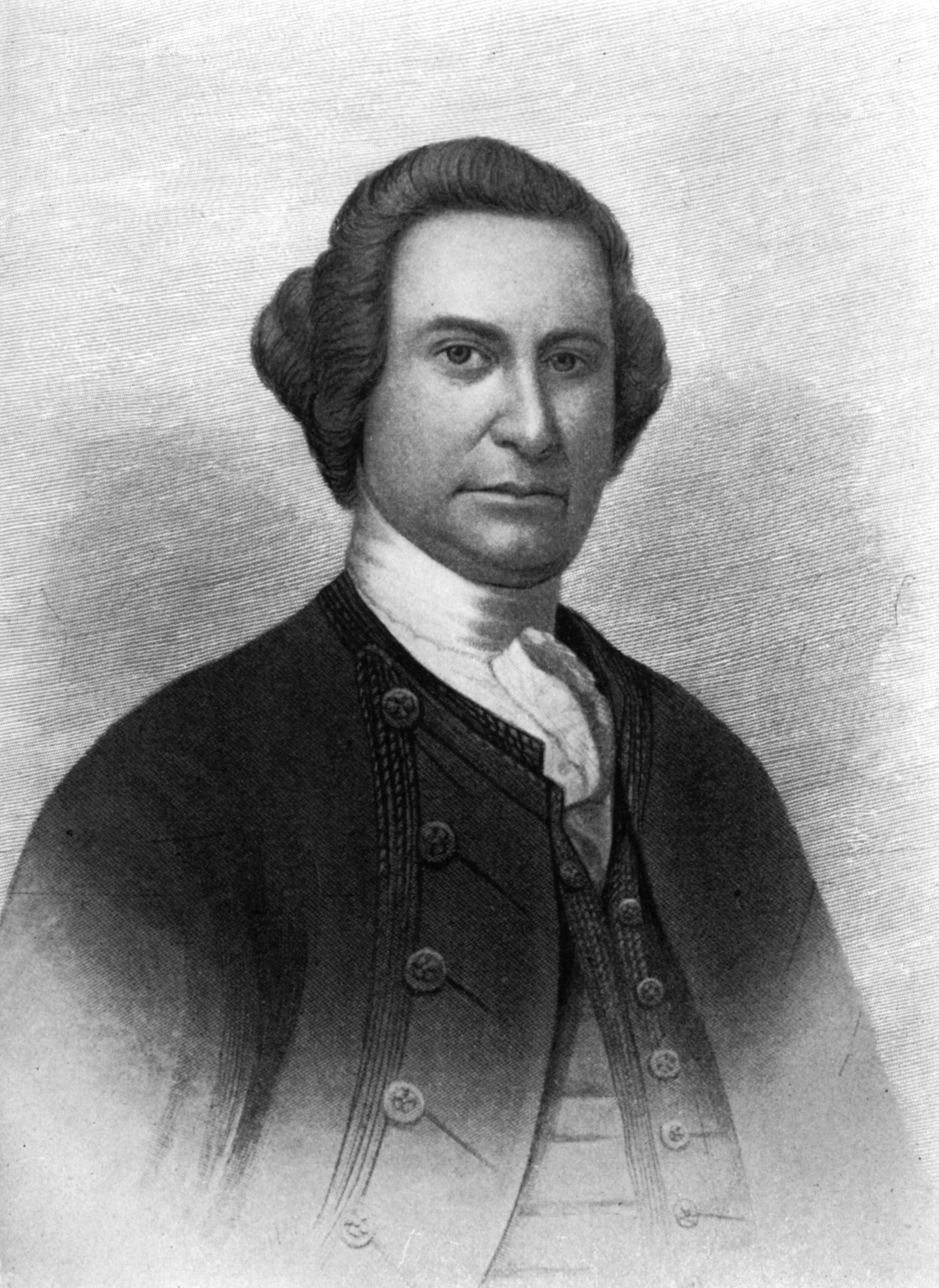
Sir William Johnson, 1st Baronet of New York

Escutcheon of the Johnson baronets of New York

In the early 18th century, in an effort to retain property, many McShane families began to translate their surname from the Gaelic "Son of John" or "Mc Shane" to the English "Son of John" or Johnson. A good example is Major General Sir William Johnson, Bt. His father had been born a McShane but translated his name, allowing his son to succeed to his uncles properties. By the early-19th century most of the official documents fail to show any McShane families in their former territory as all of them had converted to the surname Johnson. However, by the 20th century, many of the Irish branches were returning to the Gaelic name. Today the clan recognizes McShane, Johnson, Johnston, and Shane as elements of the family and are still active and viable in Ulster, America, and Australia. The family leadership today is directly descended from Shane's son Conn, to his son Hugh McShane O'Neill and is closely involved in the greater O'Neill clan activities and their present chief takes part in the Association of O'Neill Clans and is on the O'Neill family council.

== Caribbean O'Neills ==
Tulio and Enrique O'Neill y O'Kelly, of the O'Neills of the Fews, became residents of St. Croix in the 1770s in the footsteps of a deceased uncle. Tulio's sons, Arturo and Tulio O'Neill y O'Keefe, were granted land in Puerto Rico in 1804. Arturo moved his family there in March 1810 and his descendants continue to reside there today as well as in Spain and the USA.

The O'Neills of Martinique settled in the early 1700s; in the next century, they claimed to be Count of Tyrone and lineally descended from Hugh O'Neill, Earl of Tyrone. This claim (which rested on a single-sentence document in their own possession) is currently regarded as unproven. The main stem of this family is now extinct in the male line; collateral descendants may exist.

== Today ==
Geneticists have found that 21 percent of men from north-western Ireland, 8 percent from all of Ireland, a substantial percentage of men from western and central Scotland, and about 2 percent of men from New York bore a relevant Y-chromosome haplotype. They estimated that about 2–3 million men bear this haplotype. Moore et al. concluded that these men descend from "a single early-medieval progenitor" and proposed that this could be Niall. According to the PBS documentary series Finding Your Roots, Bill O'Reilly, Stephen Colbert, Colin Quinn, Bill Maher, and the show's host, Henry Louis Gates Jr. all display STR markers consistent with the Irish Modal Haplotype.

== Coats of arms ==
It is a common misconception that there is one coat of arms associated to everyone of a common surname, when, in fact, a coat of arms is property passed through direct lineage. This means that there are numerous families of O'Neill under various spellings that are related, but because they are not the direct descendants of an O'Neill that owned an armorial device do not have rights or claims to any arms themselves.

The coat of arms of the O'Neills of Ulster, the branch that held the title of High Kings of Ireland, were white with a red left hand (latterly, the Red Hand of Ulster), and it is because of this prominence that the red hand (though a right hand is used today, rather than the left used by the high kings) has also become a symbol of Ireland, Ulster, Tyrone and other places associated with the family of O'Neills. The red hand by itself has become a symbol of the O'Neill name, such that when other O'Neill family branches were granted or assumed a heraldic achievement, this red hand was often incorporated into the new coat of arms in some way.

The red hand is explained by several legends, with a common theme of a promise of land to the first man to sail or swim across the sea and touch the shores of Ireland. Many contenders arrive, including a man named O'Neill, who begins to fall behind the others. O'Neill cuts off his left hand and throws it onto the beach before the other challengers can reach the shore, becoming the first to touch land and win all of Ireland as his prize. These legends seem to originate (or to have been written down) in the 17th century, centuries after the red hand device was first used by O'Neill families.

== Related clans ==
Several Scottish families may descend from an O'Neill dynast named Anradhán. According to Leabhar Chlainne Suibhne, Anradhán, son of Aodh Athlamháin, quarrelled with his elder brother, Domhnall, ancestor of the O'Neills, and left Ireland for Scotland. This source states that Anradhán won extensive lands by conquest, and married the daughter of the King of Scots. Anradhán, who does not appear in contemporary sources, was apparently an 11th-century dynast, son of Aodh Athlamháin, King of Aileach (died 1033). Although Leabhar Chlainne Suibhne states that Anradhán gained his lands through conflict, it is possible that he secured these lands in Argyll through marriage to their heiress. Leabhar Chlainne Suibhne, Dubhaltach Mac Fhirbhisigh's genealogies, and Cú Choigcríche Ó Cléirigh's pedigrees specifically state that the MacSweens were descended from Anradhán. According to Mac Fhirbhisigh's genealogies, Ó Cléirigh's pedigrees, and MS 1467, the Lamonts were also descendants. MacLachlans were also descendants, according to Ó Cléirigh's pedigrees and MS 1467. According to MS 1467, the MacSorleys of Monydrain, ([of Clan MacDonald of Dunnyveg a branch of Clan Donald) and MacEwens of Otter are also descendants. The Gilchrists appear to be another family descended from Anradhán. The original Gaelic surname of the Highland Livingstones suggests that they were also descendants. There is uncertainty regarding the ancestry of the MacNeills. The family of Barra may well be unrelated to the family of Taynish and Gigha. It is uncertain if either family descended from Anradhán, although tradition dating to the turn of the twentieth century suggests that the Barra family may have.

- Siol Alpin as noted above the Uí Neill dynasty are descended from Siol Alpin
- Clan Bruce Clan claim descent from the Connachta's Uí Briúin.
- Bruce (Russian nobility) a branch of Clan Bruce
- Clan Campbell related to the Uí Néill.
- Clan Cumming Clan related to the Uí Néill.
- Clan Donald Claims to be traced back to through a long line of ancestors back to the High Kings of Ireland, namely Colla Uais and Conn of the Hundred Battles to Cairbre Lifechair a commons ancestor of the Uí Néill and the Connachta
- Clan Ewen of Otter claim descent from the Ui Neill.
- Clan Gregor claim descent from Siol Alpin.
- Greig (Russian nobility) a branch of Clan Gregor
- Clan Irvine claim descent from the O'Neill
- Clan Macfie claim descent from Siol Alpin
- Clan Mackenzie related to the Ui Neill.
- Clan Mackinnon claim descent from Siol Alpin
- Clan Maclaine of Lochbuie related to the Ui Neill.
- Clan MacLean intermarried with the Ui Neill.
- Clan Macquarrie claim descent from Siol Alpin
- Clan Macqueen alleged to be of same descent as Clan Donald.
- Clan MacSweeney-as noted above claim descent from Uí Néill.
- Clan Munro claim descent from the O'Neill
- Clan Oliphant intermarried with the Bruce Clan
- Clann Ruaidhrí Claim descent from the O'Neill
- Ó Brádaigh-sept of the O'Brian clan.
- De Burgh/Burke-married into the O'Brian Clan
- O'Carroll clan -related to the Ui Neill.
- O'Cahan - claim descent from the Uí Néill.
- Clan Ó Ceallaigh-related to the Uí Néill.
- Clann Cholmáin/O'Melaghlin-MacLaughlin Clan claim descent from the Southern Uí Néill.
- Ó Cléirigh Clan intermarried with the O'Nell
- Ó Coileáin related to the Uí Néill.
- Ó Conchubhair claim descent from the Connachta's Uí Briúin.
- Ó Conghalaigh intermarried with the Uí Néill.
- O'Connell Clan intermarried with the O'Brians.
- Ó Dálaigh Clan claim descent from a son of Niall of the Nine Hostages.
- Dempsey Clan intermarried with the O'Nell
- O'Devlin clan claim descent from Uí Néill.
- O'Doherty clan claim descent from Uí Néill.
- O'Donnell dynasty Clan claim descent from Uí Néill.
- Donnellan clan related to the Uí Néill
- O'Donnelly Clan claim descent from Uí Néill.
- O'Donovan Clan (Descended from the House of Ivar) intermarried with O'Brian clan
- Ó Fionnagáin Finnegan Clan claim descent from father of Niall of the Nine Hostages.
- FitzGeralds intermarried with the Uí Néill.
- O'Gallagher Clan claim descent from Uí Néill.
- Gavigan Clan claim descent from the Southern Uí Néill.
- O'Gorman Clan intermarried with the Uí Néill.
- O'Grady Clan are distant relations of the O'Brian Clan.
- Ó hÁdhmaill The clan are a branch of Cenél nEógain (specifically, Cenél mBinnigh), descendants of Eochu Binneach, the son of Eógan mac Néill.
- O'Higgins family claim descent from the Southern Uí Néill.
- Ó Flaithbheartaigh Clan claim descent from the Connachta's Uí Briúin.
- Kavanagh Clan claim descent from the Connachta's Uí Briúin.
- O'Kelly Clan related to the Uí Néill
- O'Kennedy Clan descended from O'Brian clan
- Mac Brádaigh Clan. They claim descent from High King of Ireland Eochaid Mugmedon.
- McCarthy Clan intermarried with the O'Brian Clan.
- Magennis Clan intermarried with the O'Neill Clan
- Maguire Clan related to the Uí Néill.
- Clan Mackintosh reported to be related to the O'Neill Clan
- McGovern Clan
- McGuinness Clan intermarried with the O'Neill Clan
- McCausland Clan claim descent from the Cenel Eoghain race in County Londonderry and Tyrone, a branch of the Ui Neil.
- O'Murphy Clan claim descent from the Northern Uí Néill
- O'Mahony Clan. Married into the O'Brian Clan.
- O'Reilly Clan. The clan were part of the Connachta's Uí Briúin Bréifne kindred and were closely related to the Ó Ruairc (O'Rourkes) of West Bréifne.
- O'Rourke Clan. They claim descent from High King of Ireland Eochaid Mugmedon through his son Brión (whence the Uí Briúin), the half-brother of High King Niall of the Nine Hostages, the acclaimed ancestor of the Uí Néill.
- Síol Muireadaigh Clan related to the Uí Néill.
- O'Toole Clan intermarried with the Uí Néill.

== See also ==
- Uí Liatháin
- O'Neill baronets
- Sir Neil O'Neill, 2nd Baronet
- Battle of St. George's Caye
- List of Colonial Governors of Florida
- Eoin MacNeill
- Jack O'Neill (businessman)
- James P. O'Neill NYPD Commissioner
- Ralph Ambrose O'Neill Air Ace
- Richard W. O'Neill {Medal of Honor}
- William Owen Buckey O'Neill soldier and lawman

Places

- O'Neill Hall
- Shane's Castle
- Tullyhogue Fort

Related

- O'Cahan
- O'Higgins family
- Branches of the Cenél nEógain
- Northern Uí Néill
- Southern Uí Néill
- Irish nobility
- Ambrosio O'Higgins, 1st Marquis of Osorno descended from the O'Neill dynasty
- MacShane, McShane, Sir William Johnson, 1st Baronet Of New York an O'Neill branch
- King Brian Boru of the Uí Briúin an Irish dynasty of Connacht. Their eponymous apical ancestor was Brión, son of Eochaid Mugmedon and Mongfind, and an elder half brother of Niall of the Nine Hostages.
- The Rival O'Rourke and O'Reilly Clans also claim descent from the Uí Briúin
- The Scottish MacDonald Clan claims descent from Conn of the Hundred Battles an ancestor of Niall of the Nine Hostages; allegedly the MacQueen Clan claims the same descent as the MacDonald Clan
