= Gavigan =

Irish surname

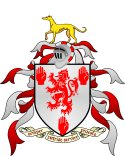
Gavigan Clan Coat of Arms

Gavigan, or Gavagan, is an Irish surname that traces its origins to different local chieftains depending upon the research performed.

== Etymology ==
- From County Mayo, Ireland, a local Irish chieftain called "Gabhadhan", the old Gaelic might have been something like, when the grammatical séimhiú is represented by the letter "h", "Ó Gáibhtheacháin". This might be translated to signify "the Anxious One".
- From "Mag Eachagáin" (son of Eachagán, in turn a diminutive of the personal name Eachadh).
- From the southern O'Neill or (as written in Irish) Uí Néill clan of Geoghegan, "Gabhachan" from north Leinster and Ulster, cattle grazers on pasture lands. "Gabha" might signify or mean a blacksmith.

The motto upon the Gavigan family coat of arms may be translated to mean Always ready to serve my king and country.

== Notable people with the name ==
- Joseph A. Gavagan (1892–1968), American politician
- Martin Gavigan, Irish former Gaelic footballer
- Michelle Gavagan (born 1990), environmentalist and beauty queen from the Philippines
- Peter Gavigan (1897–1977), Scottish footballer
- Annette McGavigan (1957–1971), casualty of the Troubles
- Ruth McGavigan (born 1976), Scottish mountain biker
