= Shane Martin (cricketer) =

Australian cricketer (born 1973)

Personal information
- Born: 11 September 1973 (age 53); Peterborough, South Australia
- Source: Cricinfo, 19 August 2020

Shane Martin (born 11 September 1973) is an Australian cricketer. He played in two List A matches for South Australia between 1993 and 1998.

== See also ==
- List of South Australian representative cricketers
