= Shane Johnson =

Shane Johnson may refer to:

- Shane Johnson (actor) (born 1976), American actor
- Shane Johnson (author), now Lora Johnson, American author
- Shane Johnson (ice hockey) (born 1974), ice hockey player
- Shane Johnson (soccer) (born 1989), defender for the Harrison City Islanders
- Shane Johnson (triathlete), Australian triathlete, see 1992 ITU Triathlon World Championships
