= Henry MacShane O'Neill =

Gaelic Irish nobleman

Henry McShane O'Neill Anraí mac Seáin Ó Néill
- Prince of Tyrone, The MacShane of Orior
- Born: c. 1545-1550
- Died: 1622 (aged 71–77)
- Family: O'Neill / MacShane
- Father: Shane O'Neill
- Mother: Catherine MacDonnell
- Occupation: Flaith

Henry MacShane O'Neill (Irish: Anraí mac Seáin Ó Néill; c. 1545-1550 – 1622) was an Irish nobleman and a son of Shane O'Neill. He was the leader of the MacShanes in the late 16th century and early 17th century, and sought control of the O'Neill Clan, fighting with his brother Art against Hugh O'Neill, Earl of Tyrone.

== Early life ==
Henry was born to the ruling family of Ulster at the time. His father is known to history as "Shane the Proud", though in his own lifetime he went by Sean Donnellach O'Neill, as he was fostered by the Donnelly clan. It is believed Henry's mother was Catherine MacDonnell, Shane's first wife, which makes him one of Shane's oldest and legitimate children. He had many half brothers, but his only full brother was Shane Og, Shane O'Neill's oldest son.

He was fostered in the households of the O'Cahan's, the O'Cuinn's and possibly MacDonnell Gallowglass, due to the danger posed by other O'Neill family members. Henry led his half brothers Hugh Gavelagh and Con MacShane O'Neill. Collectively the brothers were known as the "MacShanes", and waged a continual war from 1583 to 1591 for domination of Ulster with the backing of a Scottish army made up of Macleans and MacDonnells.

In the late 1570s, Sir William Drury detected in Hugh O'Neill, Earl of Tyrone, an ambition to become clan chief. He advised, as a further precaution, that Henry MacShane O'Neill should be maintained as a check on him.

== Push for power ==
Henry and Con made a push for power in the summer of 1584; their actions precipitated the temporary collapse of the authority of Turlough Luineach O'Neill. Hugh and Art spent two years in Scotland looking for help from their kinsman Sir Lachlan Mor Maclean. Maclean landed with a force of 3,000 men in Lough Foyle and travelled to free Henry and Con from the custody of Turlough.

Although Henry and Con remained with Turlough, the O'Donelly's and O'Cahan's defected to Mclean's side. When Turlough was thought to have died, the brothers were freed. But Con left, and without his presence western Tyrone was exposed to a direct attack from Sir Hugh O'Donnell, the Rí of Tyrconnell. Although after the death of Turlough, Henry was the strongest candidate for becoming the O'Neill, Hugh O'Neill made a direct bid for leadership and mustered a large force, marching toward the inaugural stone in Tullyhogue.

Henry was unable to quickly retaliate, as he and his brother Art were imprisoned in Dublin Castle in 1585 by Lord Deputy Sir John Perrot, who was on a tour of the north that year. They both escaped, ironically, with Hugh Roe O'Donnell, Tanist of Tír Conaill, shortly before Christmas Day 1591. Hugh Roe eventually returned to Tyrconnell, but the MacShanes were not so lucky. Art died from exposure, having suffered more for his advanced age compared to his companions during his imprisonment, and after having a rock dropped on him during their flight from the castle, in Glenmalure, during the escapers' desperate trek towards the land of Fiach McHugh O'Byrne, and Perrot enabled Hugh O'Neill and Turlough Luineach to attack the territory of James O'Donnelly, the main supporter of the MacShanes.

After Henry MacShane separated from Art and O'Donnell in Dublin, he returned to Ulster. Tyrone took the precaution of re-incarcerating Henry there. In 1593, Henry was present at Dundalk with the Earl and his Countess Mabel.

== Relationship with Hugh O'Neill ==
He opposed his first cousin, Hugh O'Neill, Earl of Tyrone, continuously during the 1590s and into the 1600s, alongside his brothers. Henry and Tyrone battled for supremacy over two decades, and Henry was subject to long imprisonment by Tyrone; but after Henry's son married Tyrone's daughter he fought for Tyrone during the Nine Years' War.

When Tyrone fled to Europe, the English seized his lands and set up a jury to redistribute them; the jury contained many of his enemies, including Henry and some of his brothers. Henry was granted a large estate from this land in Orior, County Armagh.

== Known children and grandchildren ==
Children

- Henry Og MacShane - Henry's son, Henry Og, married Hugh O'Neill, Earl of Tyrone's daughter Cortine, and was knighted Sir Henry McShane O'Neill. He was killed by the forces of Sir Cahir O'Doherty on 6 May 1608 during O'Doherty's Rebellion following the Burning of Derry. Henry Og had a son named Sir Felim Roe, and a daughter who married Brian mac Hugh Oge O'Neill, Lord of the Feeva, ancestor of Charles Henry O'Neill "The Barrister", of the Feeva, ancestor of the O'Neill Conroys of Newfoundland through his only daughter Elizabeth and James Gervé Conroy, whose descent is now numerous. Padré Carlos, or "San Carlos" of Monsefú Perú, (died 1966) was of this line.
- Con Boy McShane – Son of Henry. Little is known about Con Boy other than that he led a raid on MacMahon country for Turlough Lineach in 1569.
- Cormocke MacShane - Member of the jury to distribute Hugh O'Neill's land

Grandchildren

- Sir Felim Roe MacShane – Son of Henry Og, knighted like his father. Born 1604, died 1653.
- Sir Turlough MacShane - Son Of Henry Og, knighted; married Catherine Ny; their children were Neal Roe, Bryan, Henry, Con Boy, Charles, Hugh, Phelim and Turlough Og. He died young in 1608 and his land was divided among his immediate family.

Great-grandchildren

- Phelim MacShane - son of Turlough. Received land with his mother in Tyrone. Leader in the 1641 Rebellion; executed 1653.
- Turlough Og MacShane– brother of Felim Roe; received land in Armagh.
