= Shane Evans =

Shane Evans may refer to:

- Shane Evans (artist), American writer and artist
- Shane Evans (musician) (born 1970), American musician
