= Shane Smith (horticulturist) =

American horticulturist (born 1954)

Shane Smith (born March 1954) was the director and a founder of the Cheyenne Botanic Gardens, and an author, consultant and lecturer.

== Education ==
Smith attended Colorado State University, was a Loeb Fellow at Harvard, and is a registered horticultural therapist with the American Horticultural Therapy Association.

== Career ==
At age 23 in 1977, Shane Smith became the first Director of the Cheyenne Community Solar Greenhouse. It was the first large-sized 100% solar heated greenhouse and was constructed by volunteers (including Smith). Its initial mission was to provide food and meaningful activities for senior volunteers. It operated as a non-profit under the umbrella of Community Action of Laramie County and was located on the outskirts of Cheyenne, WY. Over the next nine years Smith added youth-at-risk and disabled adults to the volunteer workforce. Outside the solar greenhouse he oversaw the addition of the state's first community garden and wheelchair accessible orchard. The project also included a chicken coop and bee hives. Smith also started the Wyoming's first Farmer's Market in 1980 held in a city park. It was later moved to downtown Cheyenne. As grant funding became increasingly tenuous, Smith started a small garden store inside the greenhouse which provided needed income and was run with volunteers. The store sold seeds, fertilizers and plants that the volunteers grew. Over time the operation evolved to be a hybrid combining community based agriculture project and a botanic garden, as more tours occurred along with the addition of interesting and unusual plants and educational events. In the mid 1980s, with the support of the Cheyenne City Council, Smith applied for and received a federal grant for $42,700 that would fund a new solar heated greenhouse to be built in Lions Park in Cheyenne. Upon completion of the new greenhouse in 1986, the operation was transferred from Community Action of Laramie County to the City of Cheyenne Parks and Recreation Department. The name of the operation was changed from the "Cheyenne Community Solar Greenhouse" to the "Cheyenne Botanic Gardens." Smith continued as Director under the new operation as did his assistant director at the time, Claus Johnson. The new operation also continued to utilize a volunteer workforce of seniors, youth at risk and disabled adults. Smith retired from the Cheyenne Botanic Gardens in March 2018. He continued to volunteer as the executive director of the non-profit Friends of the Cheyenne Botanic Gardens through October 2019. Upon full retirement from the Cheyenne Botanic Gardens the non-profit Friends of the Cheyenne Botanic Gardens gave him the honorary title of "Cheyenne Botanic Gardens Director Emeritus," to recognize his founding of the project and his 40 years of service.

Smith continues to lecture and consults on public garden operation, greenhouses, gardening, horticultural therapy, children's garden design and operation, community greening and other gardening and landscaping topics. He writes occasional articles for garden periodicals such as Mother Earth News.

== Writing ==
Smith is author of the book Greenhouse Gardener's Companion, Revised: Growing Food & Flowers in Your Greenhouse or Sunspace. In 1982, he wrote The Frost Free Greenhouse, the first book written on the subject of farming in large unheated greenhouses (now commonly called "high tunnels"). It was published by "Western Sun," a Department of Energy contractor. Smith's first book, was published in 1982 (now out of print), and was The Bountiful Solar Greenhouse. It was the first gardening book written on the subject that addressed the special needs of growing in solar heated greenhouse. He maintains a blog and website that is related to his "Greenhouse Gardener's Companion" book for home greenhouse gardening enthusiasts.

== Awards ==
While Shane Smith was director of the Cheyenne Botanic Gardens the project received recognition awards from Presidents Reagan, Bush, and the American Entrepreneurial Leadership Award from Partners for Livable Communities. Individually, he is the recipient of the "Community Hero" award from Wyoming Governor Geringer, the Wyoming Farmers' Marketing Association's "Award of Excellence" for starting the State of Wyoming's first modern farmer's market, the 2011 American Public Garden Association's "Award of Merit", the 2012 American Horticultural Society's "Great American Gardeners Professional Award", 2012 National Garden Clubs' "Award of Excellence," and the 2025 North American Rock Garden Society's "Award of Merit."

== Shane Smith Grand Conservatory ==
In April 2019, the Cheyenne City Council voted to name the Grand Conservatory at the Cheyenne Botanic Gardens after Smith in honor of his founding the gardens and his four decades of service as its director. It is now officially named the "Shane Smith Grand Conservatory."
