= Shane Murphy =

Shane Murphy may refer to:

- Shane Murphy (footballer) (born 1955), Australian rules footballer
- Shane Murphy (Gaelic footballer) (born 1993), Gaelic footballer
- Shane Murphy (hurler) (born 1983), Cork player
- Shane Quigley Murphy, Irish actor

== See also ==
- Shayne Murphy (born 1952), Australian politician
