= Shane O'Connor =

Shane O'Connor may refer to:

- Shane O'Connor (rugby union) (born 1983), Irish rugby union player
- Shane O'Connor (footballer) (born 1990), Irish footballer
- Shane O'Connor (darts player) (born 1985), Irish professional darts player
- Shane O'Connor (skier) (born 1973), Irish alpine skier
- Shane O'Connor (2004–2022), the son of Irish singer-songwriter Sinéad O'Connor

== See also ==
- Shayne O'Connor (born 1973), New Zealand professional cricketer
- Shane Connor (born 1959), Australian actor
