= Lisa McShane =

American biostatistician and oncologist

Lisa Meier McShane is an American biostatistician and an expert on biomarkers and biometrics for precision medicine, especially as applied to the testing and treatment of cancer. She is associate director of the Division of Cancer Treatment and Diagnosis and head of the Biometric Research Program at the National Cancer Institute, and co-editor-in-chief of the journal Statistics in Medicine.

== Education and career ==
McShane majored in mathematics at Millersville State College in Pennsylvania, graduating in 1982. After a master's degree in statistics from the University of Kentucky in 1984, she went to Cornell University for continued study in statistics, earning a second master's degree in 1986 and completing her Ph.D. in 1989. Her doctoral dissertation, Statistical Quality Control Procedures for Monitoring Laboratory Analyses, was supervised by Bruce Turnbull.

She joined the National Institutes of Health in 1989, in the biometry and field studies branch of the National Institute of Neurological Disorders and Stroke, and transferred to the National Cancer Institute in 1995. She became branch chief for biostatistics in 2016, acting associate director in 2017, and associate director in 2019.

She has been co-editor-in-chief of the journal Statistics in Medicine since 2022 and is a member of the board of advisors for the journal Science Translational Medicine. Additionally, she has aided in the development of guidelines for numerous cancer-related testing procedures with the American Society of Clinical Oncology. She also co-authored the book Statistical Design and Analysis of DNA Microarray Investigations, originally published in 2003.

== Recognition ==
McShane is a Fellow of the American Statistical Association, elected in 2013.
