= Shane Ryan =

Shane Ryan may refer to:

== Sportsmen ==
- Shane Ryan (Dublin Gaelic footballer) (born 1978), Irish dual player of hurling and Gaelic football for Dublin
- Shane Ryan (Kerry Gaelic footballer), Rathmore outfield player who is also a goalkeeper for his county team
- Shane Ryan (association footballer) (born 1993), Irish football striker for Gombak United
- Shane Ryan (swimmer), Irish swimmer in the 2016 Olympic Games

== Others ==
- Shane Ryan (social activist) (born 1969), British social activist and writer

== See also ==
- Shaun Ryan, football umpire
- Shawn Ryan (born 1966), writer
