= Shane O'Mara =

Shane O'Mara may refer to:

- Shane O'Mara (musician), Australian musician and record producer
- Shane O'Mara (neuroscientist), Irish neuroscientist
- Shane O'Mara (rower) (born 1982), American rower
