= Shane McGrath =

Shane McGrath may refer to:

- Shane McGrath (hurler) (born 1984), Irish hurler
- Shane McGrath (footballer, born 1919) (1919–1974), Australian rules footballer for Melbourne
- Shane McGrath (footballer, born 1964), Australian rules footballer for Hawthorn
- Shane McGrath (The Bold and the Beautiful), a fictional character in a soap opera
