= Shane Nicholson =

Shane Nicholson may refer to:

- Shane Nicholson (footballer)
- Shane Nicholson (singer)
