= Shane Eugene Davis =

American adult film actor and model (1977–2014)

Cameron Fox
- Born: Shane Eugene Davis; November 28, 1977; Tulsa, Oklahoma, U.S.
- Died: June 12, 2014 (aged 36); Oklahoma City, Oklahoma, U.S.
- Other name: Magnet Lips
- Occupations: Actor; Model
- Years active: 1998–2014
- Agent: Falcon Studios

Shane Eugene Davis (November 28, 1977 – June 12, 2014), better known by his stage name Cameron Fox, was an American adult film actor and model. He achieved prominence in the gay pornography industry during the late 1990s and early 2000s, primarily known for his extensive, exclusive body of work with Falcon Studios.

Over his seven-year career, Davis appeared in approximately 50 adult feature films and was a recipient of multiple major industry honors, including a Grabby Award and a GayVN Award. He retired from adult cinema in 2006 and later passed away from AIDS-related complications in 2014 at the age of 36.

== Early life and education ==
Shane Eugene Davis was born on November 28, 1977, in Tulsa, Oklahoma, to parents Paul Eugene Davis and Judy Faye (Lillard) Davis. He spent a significant portion of his youth living in Tulsa, Oklahoma, where he resided with his mother, younger sister, and stepfather.

During high school, Davis was an avid gymnast, developing an athletic, highly chiseled physique that would later facilitate his entry into modeling and adult entertainment. He possessed a strong interest in music, was noted by those close to him as having a beautiful singing voice, and loved to sing. Prior to entering show business, Davis diversified his professional training by attending both cosmetology school and real estate school.

Prior to his introduction to adult entertainment, he relocated west, living briefly with roommates in San Diego, California, where those close to him remembered him for a charismatic, humorous, and deeply caring personality.

== Career ==
=== Modeling ===
Davis entered the adult film industry in 1998 at the age of 21 under the pseudonym Cameron Fox. He rapidly caught the attention of major production houses due to his athletic "swimmer's build," muscular aesthetic, and distinct brunette physical features.

He was quickly signed to an exclusive contract with Falcon Studios, the era's premier gay adult entertainment brand. Alongside his film output, Davis capitalized on his look by modeling extensively for prominent gay lifestyle, physique, and adult print magazines.

=== Adult Film Industry ===
On screen, Davis was characterized by critics and audiences as an enthusiastic, fast-paced performer. Though versatile, he was predominantly cast as a top. Reviewers from contemporary adult outlets frequently praised his intense physical output, though some noted his lack of interest in scripted, non-sexual acting roles—a trait that critics felt gave some of his later B-movie films an unusual, distinct charm.

Davis maintained a strictly pragmatic stance toward adult cinema. He was noted for avoiding the personal celebrity and public fame pursued by contemporary stars.

He formally retired from all adult media production in 2006 after completing roughly 50 features, though his films remained highly requested catalog titles for years afterward.

=== Mainstream Entertainment ===
He appeared in several independent short-form productions. Following his departure from California and adult cinema, Davis transitioned his focus back into public performance and personal creative interests. He traveled and lived across several regions, including stints in New Orleans, Louisiana.

He later established a secondary footprint in mainstream show business as an entertainer. Friends and professional peers recognized him as a highly talented makeup artist, a skill set he had formally cultivated during his time in cosmetology school and he occasionally utilized these skills performing in regional drag and theatrical productions.

== Death ==
Davis was diagnosed with HIV, which later progressed to advanced clinical stages. On June 12, 2014, Davis passed away at a medical facility in Oklahoma City, Oklahoma, from AIDS-related complications. He was 36 years old.

Following his death, his family chose cremation through Advantage Funeral Service in Tulsa. In accordance with his family's wishes, no public memorial or burial services were organized.

== Filmography ==
=== Television ===
Year	Title	Role	Notes
2005	Wet Palms	Dirk Beckendorf	Adult drama television series; directed by Chi Chi LaRue

=== Film ===
Year	Title	Role	Notes
1998	Sting: A Taste for Leather	Cameron	Debut
1998	In Deep: Miles to Go	Cameron Fox	
1999	Hard to Hold	Cameron Fox	
1999	Serviced	Richard	
2000	Sprung	Cameron Fox	
2000	Out of Athens (Part 1)	Cameron	
2000	The Crush	Cameron Fox	
2000	No Way Out	Joey	
2001	Aim to Please	Cameron Fox	
2002	Father Figure 2	Randy	
2002	Bedtime Stories 1	Steven	
2002	Working Stiff	Logan	
2002	Saddle Up	Sexy Guy	
2002	Pistons: It's a Man's World 1	Mike	
2002	Say Uncle	Cameron Fox	
2002	Branded	Cameron Fox	
2002	Prick Tease	Jeremy	
2002	Alone With 2	Robert	
2002	Handsome Devils	Ryder	
2002	Sweat & Muscle	Cameron	
2002	Young Joyriders	Norris	
2003	Fire Island Cruising 5	Joe	
2003	Living on the Rim	Cameron	
2003	My Overstuffed Jeans	Client	
2003	Taggers	Tagger	
2003	Good as Gold	Steve	
2003	The Haunted House on Sex Hill	The Bedroom Ghost	
2003	Soccer Shooters	Soccer Player	
2003	The Bachelor	Cameron	
2004	Wild Rangers 2: Hardcore Training Camp	Andrew	
2004	Pornstruck 8	Cameron	
2004	Ten Tops One Fuller	Lover	
2004	Jeff Stryker's Tall Tails	Cameron	
2004	69: Discover the Secret	Young Skylar	
2004	Desert Pick-Up 2	Handsome Guy	
2004	Fire Island Cruising 6	Cameron Fox	
2005	Knob Squad 3: Size Matters	Cameron Fox	
2005	Tag Eriksson: The Collector's Edition	Cameron Fox	
2005	The Best of Barrett Long	Cameron Fox	
2005	Paramedics	Cameron Fox	
2006	The Best of Travis Wade 1	Cameron Fox	
2006	The Best of Jeremy Penn	Cameron Fox	
2006	ShowGuys 21-30	Cameron Fox	
2006	Young Shaft 2	Cameron Fox	
2006	The Best of Josh Weston 1	Cameron Fox	
2006	The Best of Josh Weston 2	Cameron Fox	
2007	My Brother Prefers Boys 2	Cameron Fox	
2007	The Best of Tommy Brandt	Cameron Fox	
2007	Hairy Hunks 2	Cameron Fox	
2007	Boys Misbehaving	Cameron Fox	
2008	The Best of Blake Harper	Cameron Fox	
2008	In Your Face: Cameron Marshall	Cameron Fox	
2008	Hot House Backroom Exclusive Videos 9	Cameron Fox	
2008	Wet Sex 1	Cameron Fox	
2008	Ten+ 2	Cameron Fox	
2008	The Best of Cameron Fox (Falcon)	Cameron Fox	
2008	The Best of Colby Taylor 1	Cameron Fox	
2008	The Best of Cameron Fox (AllWorlds)	Cameron Fox	
2009	The Best of Travis Wade 2	Cameron Fox	
2009	Being Famous	P.C. Whoadhouse	
2010	Tender Teens	Teenager	
2010	Cops on Duty	Cameron Fox	
2010	The Best of Jeff Palmer	Cameron Fox	
2010	Rites of Initiation	Cameron Fox	
2010	The Best of Billy Brandt	Cameron Fox	
2010	Double Penetration	Cameron Fox	
2010	Falcon All Star Cum Shots 2	Cameron Fox	
2011	Boys Next Door 1	Cameron Fox	
2011	Falcon 40th Anniversary Collector's Edition	Cameron Fox	
2011	Big Dick Movie	Cameron Fox	
2011	Self-Sucking Studs	Cameron Fox	
2011	Blackpowder Hills	Burl Land	
2013	My Big Fucking Dick 19: Virgil Sainclair	Cameron Fox	
2013	The Best of Tyler Hill	Cameron Fox	
2013	The Best of Nino Bacci	Cameron Fox	
2014	The Best of Fernando Montana	Cameron Fox	

== Awards and nominations ==
Year	Award	Category	Work	Result	Ref
2000	Grabby Awards	Best Group Scene	Out of Athens (Part 1)	Won	
2000	GayVN Awards	Best Sex Scene	Serviced	Nominated	
2001	GayVN Awards	Best Group Scene	Out of Athens (Part 1)	Won	
2001	GayVN Awards	Best Oral Scene	Out of Athens (Part 1)	Nominated	
2001	Grabby Awards	Best Video	Out of Athens (Part 2)	Nominated	
2001	Grabby Awards	Best Duo Sex Scene	Out of Athens (Part 2)	Nominated	
2002	Grabby Awards	Best DVD Extras	Out of Athens (Part 2)	Nominated	

== Legacy ==
Due to the private nature of his passing, his death was initially met with little public coverage outside of immediate industry trade publications like Out Magazine. In subsequent years, his life, struggles, and premature death have been formally chronicled and preserved by global advocacy organizations, including The AIDS Memorial.
