= Shane Walker =

Shane Walker may refer to:

- Shane Walker (rugby league born 1971), former player for the St. George Dragons, Eastern Suburbs Roosters, Balmain Tigers, Wests Tigers and Melbourne Storm
- Shane Walker (rugby league born 1978), Australian rugby league coach and former player for the Brisbane Broncos and South Sydney
