= Shane Walsh =

Shane Walsh may refer to:

- Shane Walsh (Australian footballer) (born 1959), Australian rules footballer for Footscray
- Shane Walsh (Gaelic footballer) (born 1993), for Galway
- Shane Walsh (Waterford hurler) (born 1983), Irish hurler for Waterford
- Shane Walsh (Kilkenny hurler) (born 1996), Irish hurler for Kilkenny
- Shane Walsh (swimmer) (born 1976), Australian Paralympic swimmer
- Shane Walsh (The Walking Dead), fictional character in The Walking Dead

== See also ==
- Walsh (surname)
