= Shane O'Sullivan =

Shane O'Sullivan may refer to:

- Shane O'Sullivan (hurler)
- Shane O'Sullivan (filmmaker)
