= Folkstsaytung =

Yiddish-language daily newspaper in Warsaw, Poland (1921-1943)

- Type: daily newspaper
- Founded: 1921
- Ceased publication: 1939
- Political alignment: General Jewish Labour Bund
- Language: Yiddish
- Country: Poland

The Folkstsaytung (Yiddish: פֿאָלקסצייטונג, 'People's Newspaper') was a Yiddish-language daily newspaper which served as the official organ of the General Jewish Labour Bund in Poland. Folkstsaytung was published in Warsaw, Second Polish Republic.

== History ==
It began publication in 1921 and officially lasted until the Nazi invasion of Poland in 1939. Thereafter it continued on as an illegal underground newspaper until 1943. Its first editors were Victor Alter and Henrik Erlich. In 1927 it was renamed Naye Folkstsaytung ("New People's Paper"). When Ehrlich and Alter became preoccupied with their leadership responsibilities in the Bund, Leyvik Hodes took over editorial responsibility. It began to be published again after World War II but in 1948 it was taken over by Communist authorities and disbanded.

== Content ==
The newspaper reflected the Jewish secular socialist ideology of the Bund and spoke up for rights of workers, reported on Polish politics and Sejm debates, included articles on cultural and scientific topics, as well as literary works of both Jewish and non-Jewish authors. The newspaper had a women's page Froyen-Vinkl, which was edited by Dina Blond. A young people's edition was published under the title "Kleyne Folkstsaytung", under the editorship of Leyvik Hodes, who also founded the youth arm of the Bund, SKIF (Jewish Socialist Children's Federation.
