= Dina Blond =

Academic and linguist

Dina Bond
- Born: March 1, 1887; Vilnius, Lithuania
- Died: 1985 (aged 97–98); New York City, U.S.
- Other name: Szejne Fejgl Szapiro-Michalewicz
- Occupation: Yiddish translator

Dina Blond (1 March 1887 - 1985) was a prominent member of the Jewish Labour Bund in Poland and a prolific Yiddish translator. She translated over 30 works of world literature into Yiddish from German, English, and Russian.

She was born Shayne-Feygl Szapiro in Vilna, then a part of the Russian Empire, later in Second Polish Republic.

In the mid-1920s Blond became chairwoman of the Bund's women's organisation, the Yidisher Arbeter Froy (YAF). She was also editor of the women's page of the party newspaper, Folkstsaytung.
