= O'Shane =

- Pronunciation: o-SHAYN

Origin
- Origin: Northern Ireland

Other names
- Variant forms: Shane, McShane, MacShane

O'Shane is a patronymic Irish surname evolved from the given name Shane, a derivative of John, of Hebrew origin. O'Shane is uncommon as a given name. People with the name O'Shane include:

- Pat O'Shane (born 1941), Australian magistrate
- Tjandamurra O'Shane (b. 1990), Indigenous Australian who was the victim of a racial attack at the age of six
