= Conn MacShane O'Neill =

Irish noble (1565–1630)

Con(n) MacShane O'Neill (1565–1630) was an Irish flaith or Prince of Ulster, the Lord of Clabbye, nobleman, rebel, and political leader in the late 16th century and early 17th century.

Conn was the son of then lord of Tyrone, Shane O'Neill, known as "Seán an Diomas" or "Shane The Proud". There are conflicting accounts of his mother, those being the Countess Catherine MacLean, final wife of Shane O'Neill, or a daughter of Shane Og Maguire, Prince of Fermanagh, to whom Shane was briefly married to in 1562, or Mary O'Donnell, daughter of Calvagh Prince of Tir Connell. Early in life, he was often held as a pledge for his father and later his brothers good conduct to both the English and to important Irish dynasties. However, by the 1570s, he appears to live in Scotland at the court of the MacLeans.

Conn followed his brothers Hugh Gaveloch and Henry MacShane O'Neill into a protracted war against their cousins Turlough Lineach O'Neill and Hugh, the Earl of Tyrone in 1583. Collectively, the ten brothers were known as the "Mac Shanes" and waged continual war from 1583 to 1591 for domination of Ulster with the backing of a Scottish army made up of MacLeans and MacDonnells. In 1589, the ruling O'Neill Mor, Sir Turlough Lineach O'Neill, adopted Conn MacShane and declared him Tanist of the O'Neill nation.

Conn opposed his first cousin, Hugh O'Neill, the 2nd Earl of Tyrone continuously during the 1590s and into the 17th century. He went so far as to travel to England and accuse the Earl of treason in 1590. He and his brother Hugh had a letter of thanks, written by a Spanish Captain who had been shipwrecked and given hospitality by the Earl. The case was tried in front of Elizabeth and for political reasons, the Earl went unpunished. Soon after Conn's brothers Hugh and Brian were caught and executed by the Earl and the MacShanes had to return to Ulster no better off than before. In 1590, Conn was briefly elected The O'Neill Mor. However, he was overthrown and during the 9 Years War, he was arrested and again held captive by his cousin on an island stronghold in Killetra. As the Earl started to lose the war, Conn escaped and joined the English, fighting with them to defeat of the Earl. Conn was married to Mary O'Donnell, a princess of the Tyrconnell dynasty. It is difficult to determine whether she was a daughter of Manus O'Donnell or his son Sir Hugh O'Donnell, as both have named Mary or Mairéad.

When the Earl fled Ireland in 1607, Conn was rewarded with a large estate known at Clabbye in south-western Ulster for the rest of life. Conn had at least one son, and Art Og O'Neill who inherited Clabbye who was known to have fortified it and held it into the 1640s.

Conn MacShane's family was considered close enough to the Earl's to be considered part of the titled bloodline. In 1640, the 3rd Earl of Tyrone listed the descendants of Conn as the final lineage capable of claiming the title of "Tyrone" should all the lineage of Mathew "Ferdocha" O'Neill be extinguished. To that fact, in 1683, Conn's grandson Cormac MacShane O'Neill traveled to Spain and unsuccessfully petitioned for the title and position as the 8th Earl/Count of Tyrone in the Spanish creation. He was undermined by a young nephew of the 7th Earl/Count. However, upon his death in the early 1690s, the line of Conn MacShane O'Neill back in Ireland reverted using the O'Neill Mor name again, and kept up the traditions of election within the O'Neill family beyond 1888.
