= Shane O'Neill (Irish chieftain) =

Irish leader (c.1530–1567)

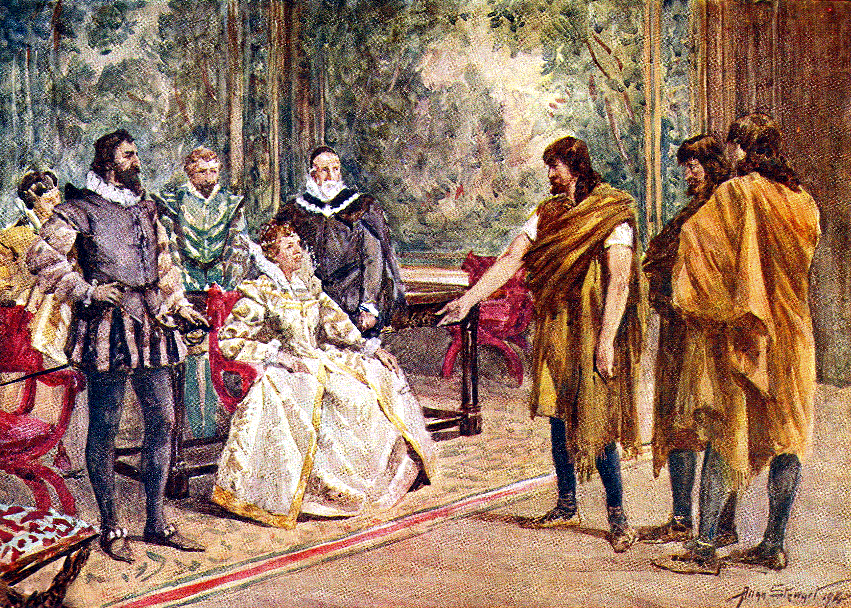
- 19th-century illustration of Shane O'Neill meeting Elizabeth I

Chief of the Name O'Neill
- Reign: 16 July 1559 – 2 June 1567
- Coronation: 1559, Tullyhogue
- Predecessor: Conn Bacach O'Neill
- Successor: Turlough Luineach O'Neill
- Born: c. 1530
- Died: 2 June 1567; Modern-day Cushendun
- Spouse: 1. Catherine McDonnell; 2. Margaret O'Donnell; 3. Catherine MacLean
- Issue: Conn Og, Henry, Hugh & others
- Father: Conn O'Neill, 1st Earl of Tyrone
- Mother: Sorcha O'Neill

Shane O'Neill (Irish: Séan mac Cuinn Ó Néill; c. 1530 – 2 June 1567) was an Irish chieftain of the O'Neill dynasty of Ulster in the mid-16th century. Shane O'Neill's career was marked by his ambition to be the O'Neill—sovereign of the dominant O'Neill family of Tír Eoghain. This brought him into conflict with competing branches of the O'Neill family and with the English government in Ireland, who recognised a rival claim. Shane's support was considered worth gaining by the English even during the lifetime of his father Conn O'Neill, 1st Earl of Tyrone (died 1559). But rejecting overtures from the 3rd Earl of Sussex, the lord deputy from 1556, Shane refused to help the English against the Scottish settlers on the coast of Antrim, allying himself for a short time instead with the MacDonnells, the most powerful of these settlers. Shane viewed the Scottish settlers as invaders, but decided to stay his hand against them with hopes of using them to strengthen his position with the English. However, tensions quickly boiled over and he declared war on the Scottish MacDonnell's defeating them at the Battle of Glentaisie despite the MacDonnells calling for reinforcements from Scotland. The Scottish MacDonnells would later assassinate Shane O'Neill and collect the bounty on his head.

Family tree

Shane O'Neill with wife, parents and selected relatives (Note: This family tree is based on genealogies of the genealogies of the O'Neills of Tyrone. Also see the lists of children in the text.)

Conn Mor; O'Neill d. 1493	Eleanor; FitzGerald
Alice; FitzGerald	Conn; 1st Earl; Tyrone c. 1480 – 1559	Sorcha; O'Neill
Phelim; Caoch; O'Neill d. 1542 d.v.p.*	Mathew; Baron; Dungannon c. 1510–1558; Illegitimate d.v.p.*	Shane; O'Neill c. 1530 – 1567; The Proud	Catherine; MacDonnell
Brian; 2nd Baron; Dungannon d. 1562 de jure	Hugh; 3rd Earl; Tyrone c. 1550 – 1616	Henry mac Shane d. 1550	Conn mac Shane; 1565–1630
Hugh; O'Neill; 1585–1609 d.v.p.*	Henry; O'Neill d. bef. 1626

Legend

XXX	Subject of the article	XXX	Earl of Tyrone

d.v.p. = decessit vita patris (predeceased his father).

== Name ==
The name "Shane" is an anglicisation of the Irish name "Séan" (John). Shane's name is given in the Annals of the Four Masters (at M1567.2) as "Sean mac Cuinn, mic Cuinn mic Enri, mic Eocchain" ("John son of Conn, son of Conn, son of Henry, son of Eoin"). Elsewhere in the Annals (e.g. at M1552.7) he is referred to as "Sean Donngaileach Ó Neill". This refers to the fact that as a youth he was fostered by his cousins, the O'Donnelly Clan, of which the Chief was Marshal of the O'Neill forces. This was rendered as anglicisations such as "Donnolloh" in contemporary manuscripts, and as "John, or Shane Doulenagh O'Neil" in Abbé MacGeoghegan's 1758 History of Ireland. It would now be properly rendered as Donnellagh. After he assumed the leadership of the O'Neills, he was referred to simply as "Ó Néill" ("The O'Neill").

The nickname "Shane the Proud" (Irish: Seán an Díomais, archaic spelling Seaghan an Diomáis), which appears in nineteenth- and early-twentieth-century popular histories, was coined sometime after his death by English writers, and originally had the pejorative meaning of "arrogant", because they wished to portray him as vain, self-indulgent and ruthless, and thus undermine the legitimacy of his claim to the earldom of Tyrone. Holinshed's Chronicles of 1587, for instance, had a side-note, "The proud taunts of Shane O'neile", the text remarking that "when the commissioners were sent to intreat with him vpon sundrie points, they found him most arrogant & out of all good order, braieng out spéeches not méet nor séemelie." Later Irish writers, such as John Mitchel and P. J. O'Shea (Conán Maol) used the nickname with more positive connotations; Seaghan an Diomáis CLG was a leading Gaelic games club in Belfast.

== Early life ==
Shane was born c. 1530, to Conn Bacach O'Neill, chief of the O'Neills of Tyrone, and Sorcha O'Neill, daughter of Hugh Oge O'Neill, chief of the O'Neills of Clandeboye. Shane's mother died while he was very young and Shane, following Gaelic custom, was fostered by the O'Donnelly family, who raised him until adulthood. As the youngest of Conn's six sons, the fact that he was not sent to one of the great families for fostering suggests that he was not expected to achieve much status. He was briefly abducted in 1531 by a rival O'Neill family, but otherwise, nothing is known about his youth.

== Feuding within the O'Neill lordship ==
The English, since the late 1530s, had been expanding their control over Ireland, this century-long effort is known as the Tudor conquest of Ireland. To incorporate the native Irish lordships, they granted English titles to Irish lords—thus making Conn Bacach O'Neill, Shane's father, the first Earl of Tyrone. However, whereas in Gaelic custom the successor to a lordship was elected from his kinsmen in the system of Tanistry, the English insisted on succession by the first-born son or primogeniture. This created a conflict between Shane, who considered it his natural right to be head of his clan, and an "affiliated son" or adoptee of his father Conn Bacach, Matthew O'Neill or Fear Dorcha who was 'conveniently mistaken' as the offspring of Conn when he travelled to London in 1542 to be invested with the Earldom of Tyrone. Feardorcha had accompanied Conn's entourage as the Earl's eldest son Phelim Caoch O'Neill had been killed by his enemy Gillespic MacDonnell during a raid in Ulster shortly before Conn's inauguration visit. Gillespic MacDonnell's family were noted as committed adherents of Feardorcha and his descendants.

During his trip to the English court to receive the title of earl of Tyrone, Shane's father Conn Bacach, who had just lost his eldest son and was in open conflict with his surviving sons, was accompanied by the fosterling Mathew (known as Feardorcha in Irish), a youth who, until he was sixteen had been acknowledged as the son of a Dundalk blacksmith. Feardorcha's mother Alison Kelly was Conn Bacach's lover.

When Conn was created earl of Tyrone, Mathew was declared to be Conn's heir in English law, disinheriting all of Conn's surviving sons, including Shane. Under English law, Mathew, titled Baron of Dungannon from Conn's principal house in Tyrone, was intended to succeed him as 2nd Earl of Tyrone. However, Mathew was ambushed and killed by Shane's foster brothers, the O'Donnelly, in 1558, some months before the death of Conn Bacach, and the claim to the earldom passed to Brian, Mathew's eldest son, who was later killed in 1562 in a skirmish with Turlough Luineach.

The claim to the earldom now passed to Mathew's next son Hugh O'Neill who had been removed to England by Sir Henry Sidney in 1559 and was brought up there while Shane established his supremacy in Ulster; some sources say it was to the Pale that he was removed.

== Becoming the O'Neill ==
Shane was inaugurated as the O'Neill. In English law, this was an illegal usurpation of the rulership of Ulster. But according to Brehon law succession (tanistry), Shane had every claim to be chief of the name. The case for Mathew's disqualifying status under both English and Irish law, as an affiliated member of the family rather than as an actual son of Conn Bacach, was carefully stated by Shane when he made his own claim to the title of Earl of Tyrone both before and during his visit to Queen Elizabeth in 1562, and restated in some detail by the English authorities when Hugh O'Neill was outlawed during the Nine Years' War.

== Relationship with the English ==
Although the O'Neill had allied himself against the English with the Scottish MacDonnell clan, who had settled in Antrim, Queen Elizabeth I, on succeeding to the English throne in 1558, was inclined to come to terms with the O'Neill, who after his father's death functioned as de facto head of the dynasty. She accordingly agreed to recognise his claims to the lordship, throwing over Brian O'Neill, son of the assassinated Feardorcha, Baron of Dungannon, if the O'Neill would submit to her authority and that of her deputy. O'Neill refused to put himself in the power of the Earl of Sussex, Thomas Radclyffe, without a guarantee for his safety; and so Elizabeth decided to establish Brian in his place.

An attempt by Sussex to increase the enmity of the O'Donnells against the O'Neill was frustrated by his seizure of Calvagh O'Donnell in a monastery. Elizabeth, whose prudence and parsimony were averse to so formidable an undertaking as the complete subjugation of the powerful O'Neill, desired peace with him at almost any price. Elizabeth's faith in Sussex's aggressive strategy diminished when the repeated annual devastations of O'Neill's territory by the Lord Deputy with sizeable and expensive armies failed to bring him to submission.

The O'Neill destroyed the greater part of Sussex's invasion army at the Battle of the Red Sagums, 18 July 1561, while Sussex was deep in O'Neill-controlled territory garrisoning Armagh with a small body of men. Afterwards, Elizabeth sent the Earl of Kildare to arrange terms with the O'Neill, who was demanding a complete withdrawal of the English from his territory. Unable to succeed against O'Neill in battle, Sussex tried in 1561 to assassinate him using poisoned wine. The O'Neill now called the lord deputy to account for his unnatural enmity, as displayed in this most recent of many attempts on his life.

Elizabeth consented to treat, and hostilities ceased on terms that gave the O'Neill practically all his demands. The O'Neill offered some concessions, most significantly consenting to present himself before Elizabeth in London to argue his case against Sussex and the Baron of Dungannon in person. The O'Neill requested the hand of Sussex's half-sister Lady Frances Radclyffe in marriage as an earnest of future friendship. Accompanied by the Earls of Ormonde and Kildare as surety for his safety, the O'Neill reached London on 4 January 1562. William Camden describes the wonder which his gallowglasses occasioned in the English capital, with their heads bare, their long hair falling over their shoulders and clipped short in front above the eyes, and clothed in saffron-dyed shirts of fine linen.

Elizabeth was less concerned with the respective claims of Shane O'Neill and the Baron of Dungannon, the former resting on Gaelic law, the latter on an English patent, than with the question of policy involved. Characteristically, she temporised; but fearing that Shane could become a tool of Spanish intriguers, she permitted him to return to Ireland, recognising him as The O'Neill. (Elizabeth's recognition of his claim to the title the O'Neill was meaningless, except symbolically, as she had no authority to confirm a title conferred under Brehon law.)

During this visit, Shane's legal claim to his father Conn Bacach's earldom was verbally confirmed and Shane was led to believe that he would be recognised as the 2nd Earl of Tyrone, though some reservation was made of the possible future rights of Hugh O'Neill, who had succeeded his brother Brian as Baron of Dungannon. Brian had been killed in a skirmish in April 1562 by Shane's tanist, Turlough Lynagh O'Neill. However, confirmation of the grant of the earldom was never delivered, and the O'Neill was compelled to defend his hegemony in Ulster when his onetime supporter Sir Henry Sidney was appointed Lord Deputy and resurrected Sussex's policy of undermining the O'Neill's authority.

== War in Ulster ==
There were at this time three powerful contemporary members of the O'Neill dynasty in Ireland—Shane O'Neill himself, Sir Turlough and Brian, 1st Baron of Dungannon. Turlough had been elected tanist (successor) when Shane was inaugurated as the O'Neill, and hoping to supplant him. During Shane's absence in London, Turlough assassinated his principal rival, Mathew's eldest son Brian, during the O'Neill's absence when rumours of his imprisonment began to circulate. On return to Ireland, the O'Neill quickly re-established his authority, and, in spite of Sussex's protestations, renewed his battle with the O'Donnells and the MacDonnells to force them to recognise O'Neill hegemony in Ulster.

In turning his hand against the MacDonnells, Shane O'Neill claimed that he was serving the Queen of England in harrying the Scots. He fought an indecisive battle with Sorley Boy MacDonnell near Coleraine in 1564, and the following Easter hosted his entire army at Feadan above Newry. Marching north at unprecedented speed, the O'Neill surprised the MacDonnells, who had expected him to intervene against an incursion by James MacDonnell of Dunnyveg's own household troops who had landed in Lecale. While James MacDonnell of Dunnyveg and his brothers rapidly assembled an army in Scotland, the O'Neill defeated Sorley Boy MacDonnell's local levies at Knockboy above Broughshane, crossed the Antrim mountains by way of Clogh and after burning James's new castle at Redbay, pursued the remains of Sorley's army and the recently landed army under James to the neighbourhood of Ballycastle, where he routed the MacDonnells at the Battle of Glentaisie and took Sorley's and his badly wounded brother James prisoner.

This victory greatly strengthened Shane O'Neill's position, and Sir Henry Sidney, who became lord deputy in 1565, declared to the earl of Leicester that "Lucifer himself was not more puffed up with pride and ambition than O'Neill". The O'Neill ravaged the Pale, failed in an attempt on Dundalk, made a truce with the MacDonnells, and sought help from the Earl of Desmond. The English invaded Donegal and restored O'Donnell.

== Wives ==
The custom among the nobility of sixteenth-century Ireland was for marriage to be undertaken to cement political alliances between powerful or enemy families. If the alliance fell apart, the wife could return to her father in a form of political divorce. All Shane's marriages were of this type. His first wife was Catherine, the daughter of James MacDonald of Dunnyveg, Lord of the Isles. The O'Neill married Catherine while the MacDonnells were providing him with military support during the 1550s to contest the Lordship of Tyrone with his father Conn Bacach, at the time the O'Neill.

The O'Neill divorced Catherine to forge an alliance with the O'Donnells of Tyrconnell. He married Mary, a daughter of the Lord of Tyrconnell, Calvagh O'Donnell. Mary's brother's open hostility to the alliance led to the O'Neill rejecting Mary. In the ensuing conflict, the O'Neill captured and imprisoned her father Calvagh O'Donnell.

Calvagh was married to Catherine, the Dowager Countess of Argyll and daughter of Hector Mor MacLean of Clan MacLean of Duart on the Scottish island of Mull. Catherine was also the former wife of Archibald Campbell, 4th Earl of Argyll, whose favour could ensure Shane a ready supply of Highland "Redshank" mercenaries. Shane kept Calvagh imprisoned at Benburb and his island stronghold of Fuath na nGall (translation: "Hatred of Foreigners") on the shore of Lough Neagh for many years. During Calvagh O'Donnell's imprisonment, this Catherine willingly became the O'Neill's lover. Upon Calvagh's eventual negotiated release, Catherine refused to accompany him, electing to stay with Shane. Her father, Hector Mor MacLean, came to Ireland and blessed her marriage with the O'Neill in 1563.

During the O'Neill's visit to London in 1563, he requested that Queen Elizabeth should find him "a well-born Englishwoman" for a wife.

Between May and June 1567, while the O'Neill was attempting to negotiate a military alliance with the MacDonnells in the wake of his catastrophic defeat at Battle of Farsetmore, he discussed the possibility of divorcing Catherine MacLean to marry his current lover, Agnes Campbell, widow of James MacDonald; the O'Neill had captured her with her husband at the Battle of Glentasie in 1565. Agnes was the illegitimate sister of Catherine's earlier husband, the Earl of Argyll.

The O'Neill was, however, still married to Catherine on 2 June 1567, the day of his assassination at Castle Cara, Cushendun, at the hands of a MacDonnell group with whom he was negotiating possible military aid. Catherine and her children had accompanied the O'Neill and his entourage to the MacDonnell camp at Castle Cara below Ballyterrim, and after his assassination they fled across the river Bann to the forest of Glenconkeyne, where they were protected by a lord of the Clandeboye O'Neills. Catherine made her way to safety at Duart Castle, where her brother fostered the youngest of Shane's children, those who had been born to his sister, while offering protection to the other MacShanes.

== Descendants: the Mac Shanes ==
Shane had at least ten sons by his wives, as well as possible other offshoots. Many of them were fostered in O'Neill relations and vassals after their father's death, and they became the rival force to Hugh O'Neill in his climb to power in the 1580–1600 time frame.

His children with Catherine MacDonnell were:

- Shane Og. He was tanist to Turlough Luineach, in 1579, and was killed by the O'Reilly's after an unsuccessful raid in Breifne in 1581.
- Henry MacShane O'Neill, whose mother was Catherine MacDonnell. Father of Sir Henry Ó Néill and Con Boy McHenry. Perhaps the most famous of Shane's sons, he was given a large Estate in Orior County, Armagh. He died in 1622.
- Turlough, whose mother was Catherine MacDonnell of the Route. He died in 1598.

His children with Catherine MacLean were:

- Cormac, whose mother was Catherine MacLean, stayed with his brother Hugh MacShane, as did his son Cormac Boy (Buidhe). He died after 1603.
- Hugh Gaveloch, the most popular of the Mac Shanes, led an army of his McLean kinsmen into Ulster to support his claim to the O'Neill Mór title, but was captured and hanged by his first cousin, Hugh, Earl of Tyrone. He died in January 1590.
- Art, whose mother was Catherine MacLean; he died of exposure after escaping from English captivity in a heroic trek from Dublin Castle through snow-covered Dublin and Wicklow with Red Hugh O'Donnell at Christmas 1592.
- Brian Laighneach, whose mother was Catherine MacLean. He died after 1598.
- Rufus K. O'Neill/ Neely born in 1545. Married an English woman with descendants immigrating to The United States in the mid 1600's.

His children of unknown parentage were:

- Edmond, died fighting against Hugh O'Neill, Earl of Tyrone.
- Conn MacShane O'Neill, whose mother was either Catherine MacLean or the daughter of Shane Óg Maguire. He invaded Ulster in 1583 with 3,000 Scottish soldiers and was named Tanist of the O'Neill, Turlough Luineach, in the 1580s. During the Nine Years' War he fought against his cousin the earl and was given a large estate (1,500 acres [6.1 km^{2}]) and the manor lordship of Clabbye in Fermanagh. He played a part in Ulster politics until his death in 1630/1. Two of his grandsons were made Spanish counts.
- Niall, whose mother is thought to have been Catherine O'Donnell.
- Rose, who married Conn O'Donnell of Lifford.

Possible:

- Hugh McShane O'Neill, whose mother was Catherine MacLean, became chief of the O'Neill sept inside Glenconkeyne forest. Hugh's parentage is however uncertain. Several other McShanes are listed in pardons issued by letters patent on 20 October 1609, with one listed as being "McShane McOwen", suggesting that their Shane was the son of an Owen O'Neill rather than Conn Bacagh.

== Defeat and death ==
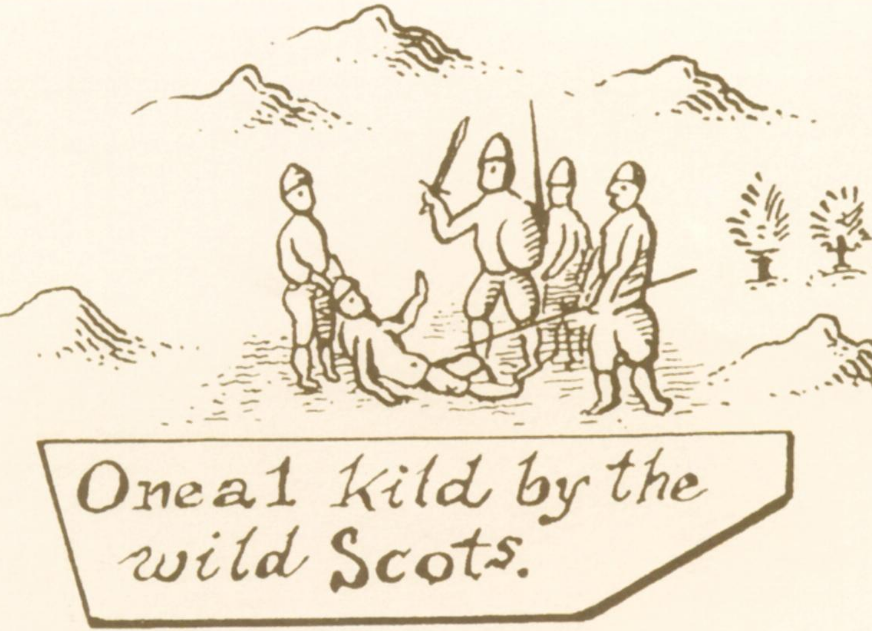
Illustration of O'Neill's death by John Speed, c. 1600

Failing in an attempt to arrange terms, and also in obtaining the help which he solicited from France, the O'Neill was utterly routed by the O'Donnells again at the Battle of Farsetmore near Letterkenny; and seeking safety in flight, he threw himself on the mercy of his enemies, the MacDonnells. Attended by a small body of gallowglass, and taking his prisoner Sorley Boy with him, he presented himself among the MacDonnells near Cushendun, on the Antrim coast, hoping to propose an alliance. Here, on 2 June 1567, he was killed by the MacDonnells, and his headless body was buried at Crosskern Church at Ballyterrim above Cushendun. His body was possibly later moved to Glenarm Abbey. Unbeknownst to Shane, the Scots had already come to an agreement with Henry Sidney and William Piers, seneschal of Clandeboye, commander of the English garrison at Carrickfergus. The English Government tried to pass this off as a "drunken brawl" turned savage. Piers travelled to Cushendun to take Shane's head and send it to Dublin Castle.

In his private character, Shane O'Neill was presented by the English as a brutal, uneducated savage. However, Irish history is often written by English historians. O'Neill had talent as a politician and tactician. Calvagh O'Donnell, when Shane's prisoner, claimed he was subjected to continual torture. However, Calvagh's wife, Catherine, the dowager Countess of Argyle, became his lover; Shane married her in 1563 and had several children by her. He frustrated his English opponents with his ability to defeat them in the field and then again at court. His death was greeted with delight by his enemies in London.

Shane was succeeded as the O'Neill by his tainiste, Turlough Luineach O'Neill, who married Agnes Campbell, widow of Lord James MacDonald of Dunyveg and Kintyre and daughter of Archibald Campbell, 4th Earl of Argyll some years after the assassination. Two of his sons became tanists to Turlough Luineach in his attempts to neutralise Hugh, Earl of Tyrone. The Church of Ireland Bishop of Clogher, Miler Magrath, said "the people [of Ulster] adhere to the MacShanes, whom they consider the true branch of Conn Bacach's line", but with their arch-enemy Hugh O'Neill, 2nd Earl of Tyrone, entering into warfare with the outbreak of the Nine Years' War the MacShanes were compelled to support Hugh's enemy, the Dublin administration, and their support in Tyrone withered.

== Cultural recognition ==
Antrim GAA has a Gaelic Athletic Association club named in his honour, Shane O'Neill's GAC, founded by the solicitor and antiquarian Francis Joseph Bigger. It is situated on the outskirts of Glenarm village in Feystown and has over 100 members. Shane O'Neill's hurling club was the first official GAA club in Glenarm, founded in 1903 using land donated by the Gibson family of the Libbert, Glenarm. Arthur and Dan Gibson went on to represent County Antrim. There is also a Shane O'Neill's GAC in Camloch, County Armagh.

A cairn was raised at his reputed burial place above Cushendun by the antiquarian Francis Joseph Bigger in 1908 and yearly commemorations were held in Shane's honour between that date and 1914. The poet Robinson Jeffers visited the site in 1929 and refers to Shane's Cairn in several poems in the sequence Descent to the Dead, inspired by his pilgrimage to Ireland.
