= List of people with given name Sean =

This is a list of people named Sean or Seán

== Mononym ==
- Sean (cartoonist), American cartoonist

== A–C ==
- Sean Anstee (born 1987), English politician
- Sean Astin (born 1971), American actor
- Sean Avery, Canadian hockey player
- Sean Barbabella, US Navy captain, osteopathic physician, and physician to the president
- Sean Bagniewski (born 1983), American politician
- Sean Bailey (disambiguation), multiple people
- Sean Baker (disambiguation), multiple people
- Sean Banerjee, Indian television actor
- Sean Barrett (disambiguation), multiple people
- Sean Bean (born 1959), English actor
- Sean Bell (born 1987), Australian politician
- Sean Berton (born 1979), American football player
- Sean Bonniwell (1940–2011), American singer-songwriter, frontman of the rock band The Music Machine
- Sean Bouchard (born 1996), American baseball player
- Seán Brady (disambiguation), multiple people
- Sean Brewer (born 1977), American football player
- Sean Browne (disambiguation), multiple people
- Sean Byrne (disambiguation), multiple people
- Sean Cain (born 1970), American filmmaker
- Sean Caisse (born 1986), American racing driver
- Sean Canfield (born 1986), American football player
- Sean Carlow (born 1985), Australian figure skater
- Sean Colson (born 1975), American basketball player
- Sean Carroll (disambiguation), multiple people
- Sean Casey (disambiguation), multiple people
- Sean Cattouse (born 1988), American football player
- Sean Chandler (born 1996), American football player
- Sean Chu, Taiwanese-born Canadian politician
- Sean Chiplock (born 1990), American voice actor
- Sean Clancy (disambiguation), multiple people
- Sean Clifford (born 1998), American football player
- Sean Collins (disambiguation), multiple people
- Sean Combs (born 1969), also known as Diddy, American rapper and criminal
- Sean Connery (1930–2020), Scottish actor and producer
- Sean Conover (born 1984), American football player
- Seán Considine (born 1981), American football player
- Sean Conway (disambiguation), several people
- Sean Corr (born 1984), American racing driver
- Sean Culkin (born 1993), American football player
- Seán Cummings (born 1968), Canadian playwright, actor, and director

== D–F ==
- Sean Daniel (born 1951), American film producer and movie executive
- Sean Daniel (basketball) (born 1989), Israeli basketball player
- Sean Daniels (born 1991), American football player
- Sean Danielsen (born 1982), American guitarist and vocalist
- Sean Davis (disambiguation), multiple people
- Sean Dawkins (born 1971), American football player
- Sean Dillon (disambiguation), multiple people
- Sean Doctor (born 1966), American football player
- Seán Doherty (disambiguation), multiple people
- Sean Dougherty (disambiguation), multiple people
- Sean Douglas (disambiguation), multiple people
- Sean Duffy (born 1971), United States Secretary of Transportation
- Seán Dunne (disambiguation), multiple people
- Sean Edwards (disambiguation), multiple people
- Sean Elliott (born 1968), American basketball player
- Sean Faris, American actor
- Sean Fallon (disambiguation), multiple people
- Sean Farrell (disambiguation), multiple people
- Sean Ferriter, Gaelic footballer
- Sean Fitzpatrick (born 1963), New Zealand rugby player
- Sean Patrick Flanery (born 1965), American actor, author, and martial artist
- Sean Fleming (disambiguation), multiple people
- Sean Flynn (disambiguation), multiple people
- Sean Foudy (born 1966), Canadian football player
- Sean Fraser (disambiguation), multiple people
- Sean French (disambiguation), multiple people
- Sean Fresch (born 2001), American football player

== G–J ==
- Sean Gannon (musician), English musician with group The Magic Numbers
- Séan Garnier (born 1984), French freestyle football star
- Sean Gelael (born 1996), Indonesian racing driver
- Sean Gilbert (born 1970), American football player and coach
- Sean Vincent Gillis (born 1962), American serial killer
- Sean Gleeson (disambiguation), multiple people
- Sean Green (disambiguation), multiple people
- Sean Gregan (born 1974), English footballer
- Sean Gunn (born 1974), American actor
- Sean Gunn (swimmer) (born 1993), Zimbabwean swimmer
- Sean Guthrie (born 1988), American racing driver
- Sean Hannity (born 1961), American television host, author, and conservative political commentator
- Sean Harlow (born 1994), American football player
- Sean Harris, English actor
- Sean Harris (American football) (born 1972), American football player
- Sean Hayes (disambiguation), multiple people
- Sean Heather (born 1982), English cricketer
- Sean Hickey (born 1970), American composer
- Sean Hickey (American football) (born 1991), American football player
- Sean Higgins (disambiguation), multiple people
- Sean Hill (disambiguation), multiple people
- Sean Hollander (born 2000), American luger
- Sean Hughes (disambiguation), multiple people
- Sean Hutson, American politician from Ohio
- Sean Johnson (disambiguation), multiple people
- Sean Johnston, Canadian writer
- Sean Johnston (rally driver) (born 1990), American rally driver
- Sean Jones (disambiguation), multiple people

== K–M ==
- Sean Keane (disambiguation), multiple people
- Sean Kearns (born 1968), Canadian snowboarder, skateboarder, filmmaker, producer and entrepreneur
- Sean Kelly (disambiguation), multiple people
- Sean Kennedy (disambiguation), multiple people
- Sean Kenney (disambiguation), multiple people
- Sean Kilpatrick (born 1990), American basketball player
- Sean Kingston (born 1990), Jamaican-American musician
- Sean Kinney (born 1966), American musician
- Sean Allan Krill (born 1971), American actor
- Sean Labanowski (born 1992), Israeli-American basketball player
- Sean LaChapelle (born 1970), American football player
- Sean Lahman (born 1968), American author and journalist
- Sean Lampley (born 1979), American basketball player
- Sean Landeta (born 1962), American football player
- Sean Lau (born 1964), Hong Kong actor
- Sean Lee (born 1986), American football player
- Seán Lemass, Irish Taoiseach
- Sean Lennon (born 1975), American musician and composer
- Sean Levert (1968–2008), American singer-songwriter
- Sean Lissemore (born 1987), American football player
- Sean Li, Hong Kong film actor
- Sean Lock (1963–2021), English comedian and actor
- Sean Locklear (born 1981), American football player
- Sean Love (born 1968), American football player
- Sean Ludwick, American real estate developer convicted of vehicular homicide
- Sean Lumpkin (born 1970), American football player
- Sean MacManus (disambiguation), multiple people
- Sean Mackin (disambiguation), multiple people
- Sean Maguire (disambiguation), multiple people
- Sean Mahan (born 1980), American football player
- Seán Mahon, Irish actor
- Sean Malone (1970–2020), American musician
- Sean Maloney (disambiguation), multiple people
- Sean Mannion (disambiguation), multiple people
- Sean Manuel (born 1973), American football player
- Sean Marks (born 1975), New Zealand basketball player
- Sean Marquette (born 1988), American actor
- Sean Marshall (disambiguation), multiple people
- Sean Martin (disambiguation), multiple people
- Sean May (born 1984), American basketball player
- Sean McAdam (disambiguation), multiple people
- Sean McCann (disambiguation), multiple people
- Sean McCarthy (disambiguation), multiple people
- Sean McDermott (disambiguation), multiple people
- Sean McGrath (disambiguation), multiple people
- Sean McGuire (disambiguation), multiple people
- Seán MacHale (1936–2023), Irish rugby union player
- Sean McHale (b. 2005), Irish footballer
- Sean McHugh (born 1982), American football player
- Sean McInerney (born 1960), American football player
- Sean McKenna (disambiguation), multiple people
- Sean McKeon (born 1997), American football player
- Sean McLaughlin (disambiguation), multiple people
- Seán McLoughlin (hurler) (born 1935), Irish hurler
- Seán "Jack" McLoughlin (born 1990), Irish YouTuber
- Sean McManus (disambiguation), multiple people
- Sean McNamara, American director
- Sean McNanie (born 1961), American football player
- Sean McVay (born 1986), American football coach
- Sean Cameron Michael (born 1969), South African actor, writer, and singer
- Sean Michaels (disambiguation), multiple people
- Sean Michael Wilson, Scottish comic book writer
- Sean Monahan (born 1994), Canadian professional ice hockey player
- Sean Moore (disambiguation), multiple people
- Sean Moran (born 1973), American football player
- Seán Moran (born 1992), Irish hurler
- Sean Morey (disambiguation), multiple people
- Sean Morrison (disambiguation), multiple people
- Sean Murphy (disambiguation), multiple people
- Sean Murphy-Bunting (born 1997), American football player
- Sean Murray (disambiguation), multiple people

== N–R ==
- Sean Newton (born 1988), English footballer
- Sean Noakes (born 1995), English professional boxer
- Seán Ó Sé (1936–2026), Irish traditional singer
- Sean O'Brien (disambiguation), multiple people
- Seán O'Casey (1880–1964), born John Casey, Irish dramatist
- Seán Ó Ceallaigh (disambiguation), multiple people
- Seán O'Connor (disambiguation), multiple people
- Sean O'Grady (disambiguation), multiple people
- Sean O'Neill (disambiguation), multiple people
- Sean O'Regan, American basketball coach
- Seán Ó Riada (1931-1971), Irish composer
- Seán Ó Ríordáin (1916-1977), Irish poet
- Sean O'Sullivan (disambiguation), multiple people
- Sean Parker (born 1979), American internet entrepreneur
- Sean Paul (born 1973), Jamaican dancehall rapper, singer and record producer
- Sean Payton (born 1963), American football player and coach
- Sean Penn (born 1960), American actor, screenwriter, film director, activist, and politician
- Sean Pertwee (born 1964), English actor
- Sean Porter (disambiguation), multiple people
- Sean Power (disambiguation), multiple people
- Sean Price (1972–2015), American rapper
- Sean Rash (born 1982), American ten-pin bowler
- Sean Rayhall (born 1995), American racing driver
- Sean Reid-Foley (born 1995), American baseball player
- Sean Renfree (born 1990), American football player
- Sean Rhyan (born 2000), American football player
- Sean Richardson (disambiguation), multiple people
- Sean Riley (American football) (born 1974), American football player
- Sean Rodriguez (born 1985), American Major League Baseball player for the Philadelphia Phillies organization
- Sean Rogers (disambiguation), multiple people
- Sean Rooks (1969–2016), American basketball player
- Sean Rowe (born 1975), American bishop, presiding bishop of The Episcopal Church
- Sean Rowe (musician) (born 1975), American alternative folk singer-songwriter and musician
- Sean Russell (disambiguation), multiple people
- Sean Ryan (disambiguation), multiple people

== S–Z ==
- Sean Salisbury (born 1963), American football player
- Sean Saturnio (born 1967), American football coach
- Sean Schemmel (born 1968), American voice actor
- Sean Scott (disambiguation), multiple people
- Sean Singletary (born 1985), American basketball player
- Sean Smith (disambiguation), multiple people
- Seán South (1928–1957), Irish Republican Army volunteer
- Sean Spence (born 1990), American football player
- Sean Spencer (disambiguation), multiple people
- Sean Spicer (born 1971), American former White House Press Secretary
- Sean Stewart (basketball) (born 2005), American basketball player
- Sean Strickland (born 1991), American MMA fighter
- Sean Tarwater (born 1969), American politician
- Sean Taylor (disambiguation), multiple people
- Sean Thomas (disambiguation), multiple people
- Seán Treacy (disambiguation), multiple people
- Sean Treacy (disambiguation), multiple people
- Sean Tse (born 1992), English-born Hong Kong professional footballer
- Sean Tucker (American football) (born 2001), American football player
- Sean D. Tucker (born 1952), American acrobatic aviator
- Sean Tufts (born 1982), American football player
- Sean Tuohy (born 1959), American sports commentator and basketball player
- Sean Vanhorse (born 1968), American football player
- Sean Walker (disambiguation), multiple people
- Sean Wallace, American anthologist, editor, and publisher
- Sean Walsh (disambiguation), multiple people
- Sean Weatherspoon (born 1987), American football player
- Sean Whalen (born 1964), American actor and writer
- Sean Whyte (disambiguation), multiple people
- Sean Williams (disambiguation), multiple people
- Sean Wilson (disambiguation), multiple people
- Sean Woodside (born 1970), American racing driver
- Sean Xiao (born 1991), Chinese actor and singer
- Sean Young (born 1959), American actress
- Sean Young (soccer) (born 2001), Canadian soccer player
- Sean Yseult (born 1966), American musician

== Fictional characters ==
- Sean (Street Fighter), character from the Street Fighter series
- Sean Boswell, the main protagonist of the 2006 film The Fast and the Furious: Tokyo Drift
- Sean Gismonte, a character from The Sopranos
- Sean Slater, a character from EastEnders

== See also ==
- Shaun, given name
- Shawn (given name)
- Shon (given name)
