= Cailloux =

Cailloux, Cailleux, or Caillaux is a French surname. Notable people with the surname include:

- Alphonse de Cailleux (1788–1876), French painter and gallery director
- André Cailleux (1907–1986), French paleontologist and geologist
- Andre Cailloux (1825–1863), U.S. soldier
- Edmond Caillaux (1896–1943), French World War I flying ace
- Joseph Caillaux (1863–1944), French politician and prime minister
- Henriette Caillaux (1874–1943), French socialite and wife of Joseph
- Théophile Cailleux (fl. 1879), Belgian lawyer and author

== See also ==
- Cailleux (crater), a lunar crater
- Marchand de cailloux, an album by the French artist Renaud
- Cailloux-sur-Fontaines, a town in central-eastern France
- Caillou (disambiguation)
