= Shaun Baker =

Shaun Baker may refer to:

- Shaun Baker (musician)
- Shaun Baker (actor)

== See also ==
- Sean Baker (disambiguation)
