= Shaun Scott =

Shaun Scott may refer to:

- Shaun Scott (actor)
- Shaun Scott (politician)

== See also ==
- Sean Scott (disambiguation)
