= Jim Goetz =

American venture capitalist

- Born: 1965 or 1966 (age 60–61); Detroit, Michigan, US
- Education: University of Cincinnati (B.S.), Stanford University (M.S.)
- Occupation: Venture capitalist
- Known for: Sequoia Capital, WhatsApp
- Board member of: Sequoia Capital; Intel; Palo Alto Networks
- Children: 3

James J. Goetz (born 1965/1966) is an American venture capitalist and businessman who is a partner at Sequoia Capital. Goetz is known for his focus on mobile and enterprise startups, including successful investments in AdMob, WhatsApp, Chartboost and GitHub. In 2017, Goetz announced he was stepping back from his leadership role with Sequoia, but continues to invest and represent the firm on company boards.

== Early life ==
James J. Goetz was born in Detroit, Michigan, and raised in the Midwestern United States, and attended the University of Cincinnati, where he received a B.S. in electrical and computer engineering. Afterward, he attended Stanford University and earned an M.S. in computer systems.

== Career ==
Goetz started a PhD, but chose instead to pursue a career in product management, with early stints working at AT&T and SynOptics, which later became Bay Networks.

Goetz became a vice president at Bay Networks, then left in 1996 to co-found a software company, VitalSigns. With co-founders Rajiv Batra and Monty Kersten, Goetz raised $5.5 million from Sequoia Capital and Austin Ventures in April 1997. The same month, the company released a "browser companion" application, NetMedic, enabling users to identify and correct network performance issues. In October 1998, the company agreed to be acquired by International Network Services. Following the sale, Goetz joined the venture capital firm Accel.

== Sequoia Capital ==
Goetz joined Sequoia Capital in 2004, where he has focused on mobile and enterprise startup investments. As of March 2018, Goetz sat on the board of five unicorn companies. At Sequoia, he has spoken publicly in favor of immigration as a boon to entrepreneurship, and supported initiatives to bring a closer gender balance at startups and venture firms.

Goetz has been ranked on the Forbes Midas list of top 100 venture capitalists, and occupied the top spot each year from 2013 to 2017. In 2018, he dropped to number three. In 2015, Goetz was named "VC of the Year" at the Crunchies award show, hosted by the publication TechCrunch.

=== Major investments ===
Major investments by Goetz leading to IPOs have included Ruckus Wireless and Palo Alto Networks in 2012, Nimble Storage and Barracuda Networks in 2013, and HubSpot in 2014. Notable acquisitions from Goetz investments have included AdMob, acquired by Google for $750 million in 2009, Clearwell Systems, acquired by Symantec for $410 million in 2011, Appirio's acquisition by Wipro for $500 million in 2016, and GitHub, acquired for $7.5 billion by Microsoft in 2018.

Goetz's most successful investment was in WhatsApp, in which Sequoia was the only outside investor prior to its acquisition by Facebook for $19 billion in February 2014. Sequoia's stake, led by Goetz, returned $3.5 billion on an approximate $60 million investment. TechCrunch described the deal as the "largest acquisition of a venture-backed company in history", and it earned Goetz a reputation as one of Silicon Valley's "biggest rainmakers".

=== Leadership transition ===
In January 2017, Goetz stepped back from his day-to-day management role as one of the firm's three "stewards", transitioning this role to Roelof Botha, and other duties associated with Sequoia's U.S. venture business to Alfred Lin. Goetz said at the time that he would continue to make investments and represent Sequoia on boards, but would also turn his attention to other projects.

He has been a non-executive director of Palo Alto Networks since April 2005, and Intel since November 2019.

== Philanthropy ==
Goetz created the Mantei/Mae scholarship program at the University of Cincinnati in 2010 for high-achieving students studying electrical and computer engineering and computer science.

In 2021, Goetz donated $25 million to the University of Cincinnati. The gift led to the expansion of computer science faculty, the establishment of two athletic scholarships, the creation of an honors program, and the renaming of the school's engineering building to the Mantei Center, in honor of professor Thomas Mantei. The same year, the Goetz family donated a renovated movie theater in Los Gatos, California, to the city.

== Personal life ==
As of the 2020 Forbes Midas list, Goetz was married, with three children, and lived in Los Gatos, California.
