= Sean White =

Sean White may refer to:

== Sport ==
- Sean White (baseball) (born 1981), American baseball player
- Sean White (American football) (born 1995), American football quarterback
- Sean White (rugby union) (born 1988), Canadian rugby player
- Seán White, Irish hurler
- Seán White (Gaelic footballer) (born 1995), Irish Gaelic footballer

== Other ==
- Sean White, president of Inflection AI

== See also ==
- Shaun White (born 1986), American snowboarder and skateboarder
- Shun White (born 1985), American football wide receiver
- Sean Wight (1964–2011), Australian rules footballer
- Sean Whyte (disambiguation)
