= Sean Sullivan =

Sean Sullivan may refer to:

- Sean Sullivan (actor) (1921–1985), Canadian actor born in Toronto
- Sean Sullivan (naval officer) (born 1958), American naval officer and politician
- Sean Sullivan (boxer) (born 1968), New Zealand professional boxer
- Sean Sullivan (footballer) (born 1971), Maltese professional footballer and coach
- Sean Sullivan (ice hockey) (born 1984), American ice hockey defenceman
- Sean Sullivan (judoka) (born 1970), Irish Olympic judoka
- Sean M. Sullivan, college soccer player and athletic director at the Catholic University of America
- Sean Sullivan (baseball) (born 2002), American baseball player

== See also ==
- Sean O'Sullivan (disambiguation)
