= Laetitia Garriott de Cayeux =

American entrepreneur and executive (born 1978)

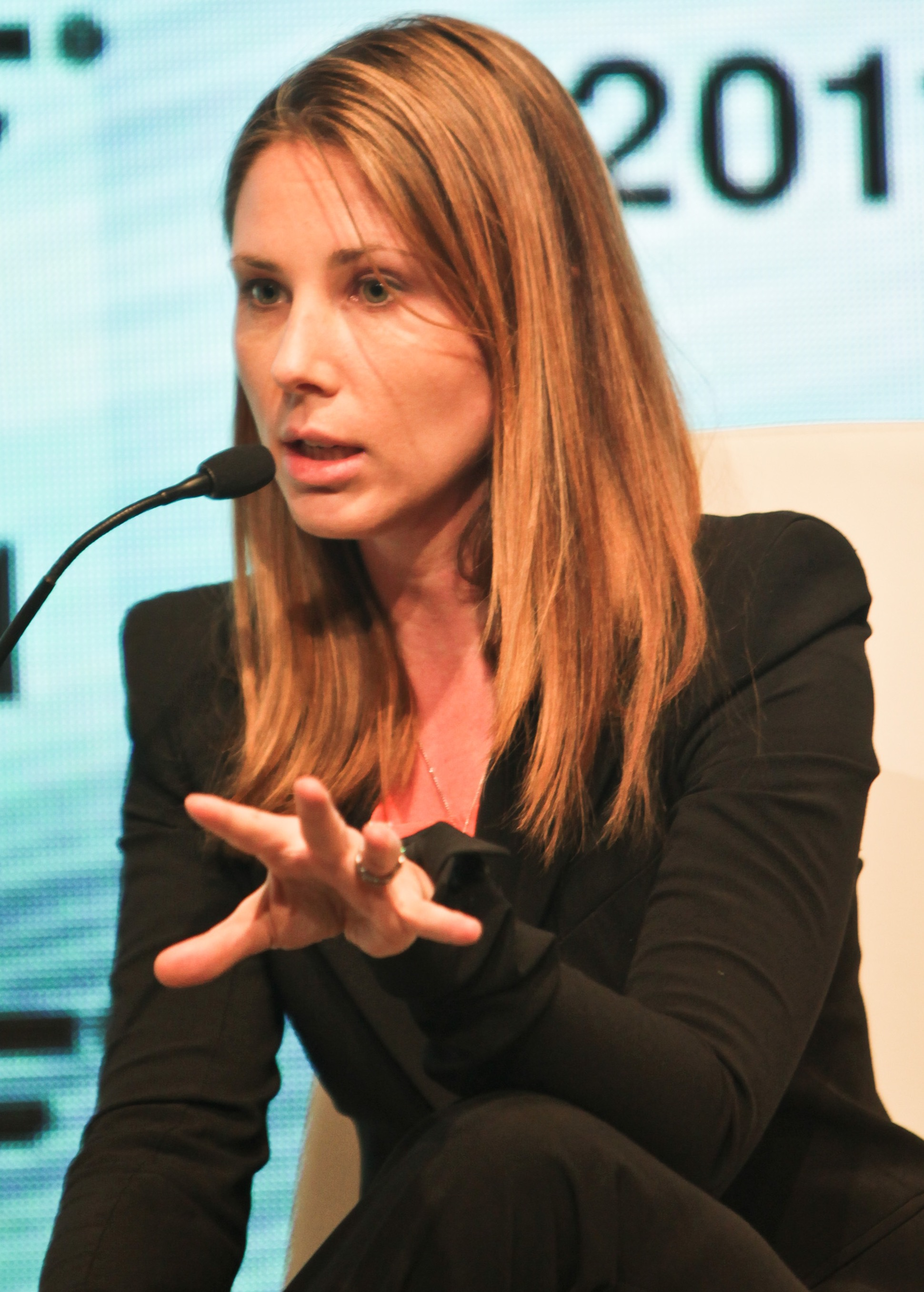
- De Cayeux at the New York Forum 2011
- Born: Laetitia Pichot de Cayeux; February 4, 1978 (age 48); Angers, France
- Education: Harvard Business School, ESSEC
- Occupations: Entrepreneur, investor
- Title: CEO of Global Space Ventures
- Spouse: Richard Garriott (m. 2011)
- Children: 2
- Relatives: Andre Cailleux (grandfather)

Laetitia Garriott de Cayeux (née Pichot; born February 4, 1978) is an American entrepreneur and business executive. She is the founder and managing partner of Global Space Ventures, a venture capital firm, serves on the United States Department of Defense Defense Science Board, and was the president and chief operating officer of Escape Dynamics.

== Early life and education ==
Born in Angers, France, de Cayeux grew up between France and Hong Kong. Her mother died when she was 7 years old. After graduating high school at 17, she won an international competition and was selected to travel to Japan to represent her native country of France at the GII Junior Summit (one of the first global conferences on the internet). She moved to the United Kingdom in 1999 at age 21, and then in 2002 to the United States. De Cayeux holds an MBA from ESSEC in France and an MBA from Harvard Business School.

== Career ==
=== Business career ===
In 1998, while still a student at ESSEC, de Cayeux worked in China on Asian equity mandates at BNP Paribas, amidst the Asian financial crisis. In 1999, at age 21, she joined the investment banking division of Goldman Sachs in London where she worked on cross-border merger and acquisition transactions involving US, European, and Chinese state-owned companies. While at Harvard Business School, she co-authored with a classmate an award-winning business plan for an egg freezing technology company, Extend Fertility, which, over 15 years ago, became the first focused on enabling women, including those undergoing chemotherapy for cancer treatment, to preserve their fertility. At 26, she became an investment principal at multi-strategy investment fund TPG-Axon Capital. She left to join Renaissance Technologies before founding investment firm Ajna Capital LLC in 2008, where she served as CEO and portfolio manager. De Cayeux is cofounder of Colorado-based advanced space technology company Escape Dynamics where she served as president and chief lperating lfficer. She is also an early investor in SpaceX and the founder of Global Space Ventures where she serves as Managing Partner and through which she supports deep tech ventures in fields ranging from artificial intelligence, and aerospace to biotech.

=== Foreign affairs and national security ===
De Cayeux was appointed by the 28th U.S. Secretary of Defense Lloyd Austin to serve on the United States Department of Defense Defense Science Board. She also serves on the NATO Maritime Unmanned Systems Innovation Advisory Board (IAB). She is a life member of the Council on Foreign Relations, and a security fellow and advisory board member of the Truman National Security Project. She has presided over discussions on the future of the US Space Force, the US-China relationship, US national security, briefed members of US Congress on national security space, and has been a speaker at international forums such as the EU US Future Forum of the Atlantic Council.

=== Boards and affiliations ===
De Cayeux supports a variety of STEM programs. She serves as board member and chair of the strategic planning committee of the National Museum of Mathematics, where she also served as chair of the audit & finance committee, and on the board of directors of the XPRIZE foundation. She and her husband have also supported STEM scholarships through MIT, Stanford University and UT Austin. De Cayeux is also a member of the Economic Club of New York, and a member of Women Corporate Directors.

=== International conferences ===
De Cayeux is a regular speaker at global technology and business conferences including the Australia Space Forum, the UAE's Global Aerospace Summit, Canada's International Space Development Conference, the Association of Space Explorers Congress, the National Space Symposium, the Women's Forum for the Economy and Society, and artificial intelligence conference Time Machine. She was a keynote speaker at the Space Frontier Foundation's NewSpace Conference.

=== Media and public engagement ===
De Cayeux has been published by the Atlantic Council, in Forbes, Huffington Post, Techonomy, and the Truman National Security Project on foreign policy and technology matters ranging from tech diplomacy and US-China relations, to North Korea's nuclear ambitions, transatlantic relations, US-France relations and national security space. She is frequently quoted in the media, including BBC Future, CNN, The New York Times, and The Wall Street Journal. She has contributed to Harvard Business School’s skydeck podcast, and appeared as a guest contributor on innovation, economic and political issues on French television channels BFM TV and M6. She briefed the foreign media pool on entrepreneurship and the economy at the 2016 Democratic Convention. She has also participated as a speaker in the US State Department Speaker Bureau Program.

=== Political activity ===
De Cayeux was an early supporter of Joe Biden’s work on behalf senatorial races in 2018, and served on the Biden for President National Finance Committee and as co-chair of Innovators for Biden, Women for Biden, AAPI for Biden and its African American Leadership Council (AALC). She also served on the National Finance Council for Hillary for America, on the DNC's Texas Victory Leaders Council, and as co-founder of Entrepreneurs for Hillary, a volunteer organization involving entrepreneurs who supported Hillary Clinton 2016 presidential campaign.

== Awards and honors ==
During her time as COO of Escape Dynamics, the company was listed by Fast Company as one of the “Most Innovative Companies” in the space sector, and its technology was named by Scientific American as one of 2015’s “World Changing Ideas”.

De Cayeux was recognized as a "Rising Talent" by the Women's Forum for the Economy and Society (2010). She was also recognized as a "Rising Star" by Institutional Investor (2010) for "outstanding accomplishments" amidst the 2008 financial crisis.

The business plan de Cayeux wrote with Harvard Business School classmate for technology company Extend Fertility was the winner of Harvard Business School business plan competition, placed second in Fortune Small Business plan competition and was a finalist in Global Start-up @Singapore business plan competition in 2004.

== Personal life ==
In 2011, de Cayeux married Richard Garriott, the only second generation US astronaut. They had their first child, Kinga Shuilong Garriott de Cayeux, on June 30, 2012. Their second child, Ronin Phi Garriott de Cayeux was born on July 28, 2014.

She is the granddaughter of French scientist André Cailleux, whom the Cailleux (crater) on the moon is named after.

De Cayeux and her husband are the owners of the Luna 21 lander and the Lunokhod 2 rover making them the world's only private owners of an object on a foreign celestial body. They were also the largest shareholder of Space Adventures, which offered zero-gravity atmospheric flights and provides orbital spaceflights to Low Earth Orbit/the International Space Station with seven clients launched to orbit as of 2016.
