= Sean Hill =

Sean, Shaun or Shawn Hill may refer to:

- Sean Hill (ice hockey) (born 1970), American former ice hockey player
- Sean Hill (scientist), American-Swiss neuroscientist
- Sean Hill (American football) (born 1971), former American football defensive back
- Sean Hill (writer), American writer
- Shaun Hill (born 1980), American football quarterback
- Shawn Hill (born 1981), Canadian former baseball player
