= Sean McDermott (disambiguation) =

Sean McDermott (born 1974) is an American football coach.

Sean McDermott or Sean MacDermott may also refer to:

- Sean McDermott (basketball) (born 1996), American basketball player
- Sean McDermott (footballer) (born 1993), Irish association footballer
- Sean McDermott (long snapper) (born 1976), former American football long snapper
- Sean McDermott (baseball), baseball coach and shortstop
- Sean McDermott (rugby union), Irish rugby union player
- Seán MacDermott or Seán Mac Diarmada (1882–1916), Irish political activist
