= Shaun Bailey =

Shaun Bailey may refer to:

- Shaun Bailey, Baron Bailey of Paddington (born 1971), member of the London Assembly, life peer, and former journalist
- Shaun Bailey (MP) (born 1992), British Conservative politician
- Shaun Bailey (cricketer) (born 1990), player for Northamptonshire

== See also ==
- Sean Bailey (disambiguation)
