= Sean Maguire (disambiguation) =

Sean Maguire (born 1976) is an English actor and singer.

Sean Maguire or McGuire may also refer to:

== People ==
- Sean Maguire (footballer) (born 1994), Irish footballer
- Sean Maguire (American football) (born 1994), American football player
- Seán McGuire (fiddler) (1927–2005), Irish fiddler
- Sean McGuire (Canadian football) (born 1996), Canadian football player
- Shaun Maguire (born 1985), American venture capitalist

== Other ==
- Sean Maguire (album), a 1994 album released by the English actor and singer
- Sean MacGuire, a supporting character in the video game Red Dead Redemption 2
