= Sean Farrell =

Sean, Shaun or Shawn Farrell may refer to:

- Sean Farrell (American football) (born 1960), American football player
- Sean Farrell (ice hockey) (born 2001), American ice hockey player
- Sean Farrell (footballer) (born 1969), former association football player
- Sean Farrell (rugby union), Australian rugby union player
- Seán Farrell (died 1972), Irish Sinn Féin politician, represented Leitrim-Sligo from 1923 to 1927
- Seán Farrell (hurler) (born 1954), Irish hurler
- Shaun Farrell (born 1975), New Zealand runner
- Shawn Farrell, fictional character in The 4400
