= Sean McLaughlin =

Sean McLaughlin or Sean McLoughlin may refer to:

- Sean McLaughlin (meteorologist), American television meteorologist
- Sean McLaughlin (record producer), American record producer
- Sean J. McLaughlin (born 1955), United States federal judge
- Seán McLoughlin (hurler) (1935–2025), Irish hurler
- Jacksepticeye (Seán W. McLoughlin, born 1990), Irish internet personality
- Seán McLoughlin (communist) (1895–1960), Irish nationalist and communist activist
- Sean McLoughlin (footballer) (born 1996), Irish football (soccer) player (Cork City FC, Hull City AFC, St Mirren FC)
- Seán McLoughlin (anthropologist) (born 1969), professor at the University of Leeds

== See also ==
- McLaughlin (surname)
- Sean, given name
- List of people with given name Sean
