= Sean Kelly =

Sean Kelly may refer to:

== Sports ==
- Sean Kelly (cyclist) (born 1956), Irish professional road bicycle racer
- Seán Kelly (Galway Gaelic footballer) (born 1997)
- Seán Kelly (Kerry Gaelic footballer) (1925–2012)
- Sean Kelly (Scottish footballer) (born 1993), Scottish footballer
- Sean Dylan Kelly (born 2002), American motorcycle racer
- Sean Wirtz (born 1979), figure skater who has competed as Sean Kelly
- Sean Kelly (volleyball player), American volleyball player

== Music ==
- Sean Kelly (Australian musician) (born 1958), founder of the Australian 1980s band Models
- Sean Kelly, Australian guitarist and member of TISM between 1983 and 1991
- Sean Kelly (Canadian musician), founder of band Crash Kelly
- Sean Kelly, singer and guitarist for The Samples

== Other ==
- Seán Kelly (politician) (born 1952), Irish Member of the European Parliament
- Sean Kelly (Irish republican) (born 1972), IRA Shankill Road bomber
- Sean Kelly (writer) (born 1940), Canadian author, wrote for National Lampoon
- Sean Dorrance Kelly, professor of philosophy at Harvard University
- Sean Kelly (integral theorist), professor in the Philosophy, Cosmology, and Consciousness program at the California Institute of Integral Studies
- Sean Kelly Gallery in New York
- Sean Kelly, stand up comedian and presenter of the television series Storage Hunters
- Sean Kelly, New Zealand fashion designer who won Project Runway season 13
- Sean Kelly, Australian journalist, and columnist for the Nine papers, previously a political adviser to Prime Ministers Kevin Rudd and Julia Gillard

== See also ==
- Sean Kelley (born 1988), American former soccer player
- Sean Kelley (sportscaster), American sportscaster
- Shawn Kelley (born 1984), baseball player
- Shaun Kelly (born 1988), English footballer
- Shaun P. Kelly (born 1964), American politician in Massachusetts
- Shawn Kelly, animator
