= Twitterature =

Literary use of Twitter

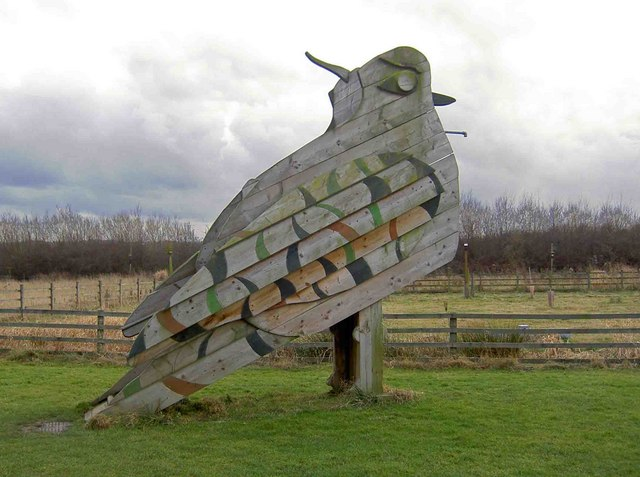
Sculpture representing the bird in the Twitter logo

Twitterature (a portmanteau of Twitter and literature) is a literary use of the microblogging service X (formerly Twitter). It includes various genres, including aphorisms, poetry, and fiction (or some combination thereof) written by individuals or collaboratively. The 280-character maximum imposed by the medium, upgraded from 140 characters in late 2017, provides a creative challenge.

== Genres ==
=== Aphorism ===
Aphorism example

The most effective way to learn is by devoting oneself to a single subject for months at a time. Its opposite is school.

— Aaron Haspel, @ahaspel

Aphorisms are popular because their brevity is inherently suited to Twitter. People often share well-known classic aphorisms on Twitter, but some also seek to craft and share their own brief insights on every conceivable topic. Boing Boing has described Twitter as encouraging "a new age of the aphorism", citing the novel aphorisms of Aaron Haspel.

=== Poetry ===
Poetry example

Augusti.
Och fast det är hett
i solen
känns det ibland
känns det ibland
som om jag
faller
handlöst mot hösten.

— Göran Greider, @GreiderDD

Haiku are a brief poetic form well suited to Twitter; many examples can be found using the hashtag #haiku. Other forms of poetry can be found under other hashtags or by "following" people who use their Twitter accounts for journals or poetry. For example, the Swedish poet and journalist Göran Greider tweets observations and poems using the Twitter handle @GreiderDD (Göran Greider) as shown in the example on the right.

On Black Twitter a form of collaborative poetry provides "clever and poetic critical commentary on the world around them" in a genre that scholars have called "digital dozens" , in reference to the verbal insult game known as the dozens. Contemporary Black American poetry has often been published on social media platforms rather than in conventional print publications.

=== Humor ===
The short form character limit of Twitter has proved suitable for one-liner jokes and humorous observations, with some notable Twitter profiles publishing humor collections that originated as tweets. Examples include Steve Martin's The Ten, Make That Nine, Habits of Very Organized People. Make That Ten.: The Tweets of Steve Martin (2012), Justin Halpern's Sh*t My Dad Says (2010), Nick Douglas's Twitter Wit: Brilliance in 140 Characters or Less – The Authorized Collection of Clever Celebrity Comedy (2009), and Brian M. Clark's Fuck All You Motherfuckers (2015).

=== Fiction ===
Twitterature fiction includes 140-character stories, fan fiction, the retelling of literary classics and legends, twitter novels, and collaborative works. The terms "twiction" and "tweet fic" (Twitter fiction), "twiller" (Twitter thriller), and "phweeting" (fake tweeting) also exist to describe particular twitterature fiction genres.

140-character story example

I was mowing the lawn. I peered at my neighbor's immaculate yard; his grass was literally greener. Then a meteor fell atop his lovely house.

— Arjun Basu, @ajunbasu

140-character stories: fiction that fits into a single tweet. An example of these stories are those written by James Mark Miller (@asmallfiction), Sean Hill (@veryshortstories), and Arjun Basu (@arjunbasu). A number of Twitter journals dedicate themselves to the form. In 2013, The Guardian challenged traditionally published authors such as Jeffrey Archer and Ian Rankin to write their 140-character stories, and then featured their attempts.

Fan fiction: Twitter accounts that have been created for characters in films, TV series, and books. Some of these accounts take the events in the original works as their starting point, whereas others may branch into fan fiction.

==== Literary classics and legends ====
Literary classics and legends are retold on Twitter, either by characters' tweeting and interacting, or by retelling in tweet format, often in modern language using slang. For instance, in 2010, a group of rabbis tweeted the Exodus, with the hashtag #TweetTheExodus; and in 2011, the Royal Shakespeare Company and the English game company Mudlark tweeted the story of Romeo and Juliet. In 2009, Alexander Aciman and Emmett Rensin published Twitterature: The World's Greatest Books Retold Through Twitter.

Epicretold, by author Chindu Sreedharan, is another noteworthy work in this genre. The New Indian Express called it an “audacious attempt...to fit the mother of all epics, the Mahabharata, into the microblogging site Twitter.” Tweeted from @epicretold, and subsequently published as a full-length book by HarperCollins India, the story was narrated in "2,628 tweets" between July 2009 to October 2014. In an interview with Time, Sreedharan said it was an attempt to simplify the lengthy epic and make it accessible to the new generation—both in India and abroad.

==== Twitter novels ====
Small Places

I've grown to like small places. I like bugs, bug homes, walking stick bugs, blades of grass, ladybug Ferris wheels made out of dandelions.

— Nick Belardes, @smallplaces
Executive Severance

Willum Mortimus Granger was beside himself. In fact when his body was found, the top half was right next to the bottom.

— Robert K. Blechman, @RKBs_Twitstery

Twitter novels (or twovels) are another form of fiction that can extend over hundreds of tweets to tell a longer story. The author of a Twitter novel is often unknown to the readers, as anonymity creates an air of authenticity. As such, the account name can often be a pseudonym or even a character in the story. Twitter novels can run for months, with one or more tweets daily, whereby context is usually maintained by a unique hashtag. Searching by the corresponding hashtag produces a list of all available tweets in the series. Some serials are posted in short updates that encourage the reader to follow and to speculate on the next installment.

One example of the Twitter novel is Small Places by Nick Belardes (@smallplaces), which began on April 25, 2008, with the tweet as shown on the right. Another example is The Twitstery Twilogy series by Robert K. Blechman (@RKBs_Twitstery). The first entry in the series was Executive Severance, which would be the first live-tweeted Twitter comic mystery (or "Twitstery"), beginning on May 6, 2009, with the tweet shown. The second Twitter novel in the series, The Golden Parachute, appeared as a Kindle eBook in 2016; and the third and concluding novel, I Tweet, Therefore I am, the Book 3, was released early in 2017.

John Roderick's Electric Aphorisms was composed in individual tweets between December 2008 and May 2009, and deleted on publication of the book itself by Publication Studio in November 2009. Traditionally-published authors have also attempted the twitter novel, such as Jennifer Egan's Black Box, which was first published in about 500 tweets in 2012; and David Mitchell's The Right Sort, first published as almost 300 tweets sent over one week in 2014. Hari Manev, who does not use Twitter, published his twitter novel The Eye, which is the first volume in his The Meaning of Fruth twitter trilogy, as a Kindle eBook in 2019. The first Russian Twitter-style novel by V. Pankratov "Юрфак.ru " published in 2013 in the publishing house "New Justice".

===== Collaborative works =====
Collaborative work example

Sam was brushing her hair when the girl in the mirror put down the hairbrush, smiled & said, "We don't love you anymore."

— Neil Gaiman

Neil Gaiman coined the term "interactive twovel" for an experiment in involving his Twitter followers in collaborating with him on a novel. This was conducted with BBC America Audio Books. The first tweet from Gaiman was as shown on the right. Then, he invited his readers to continue the story under the hashtag #bbcawdio. The result was published as an audiobook under the title Hearts, Keys and Puppetry, with the author given as Neil Gaiman & Twitterverse. Teju Cole sent lines from his short story "Hafiz" to other Twitter users and then retweeted them to assemble the story.

== History ==
X was launched as Twitter in 2006, and the first novels on the platform appeared in 2008. The origins of the term Twitterature are hard to determine, but it was popularized by Aciman and Rensin's book. Since then, the phenomenon has been discussed in the arts and culture sections of several major newspapers.

Twitterature has been called a literary genre but is more accurately an adaptation of various genres to social media. The writing is often experimental or playful, with some authors or initiators seeking to find out how the medium of Twitter affects storytelling or how a story spreads through the medium. A Swedish site titled Nanoismer.se was launched in 2011 to "challenge people to write deeper than what Twitter is for."

== See also ==
- BookTok
- BookTube
