= Piet Botha (musician) =

South African musician (1955–2019)

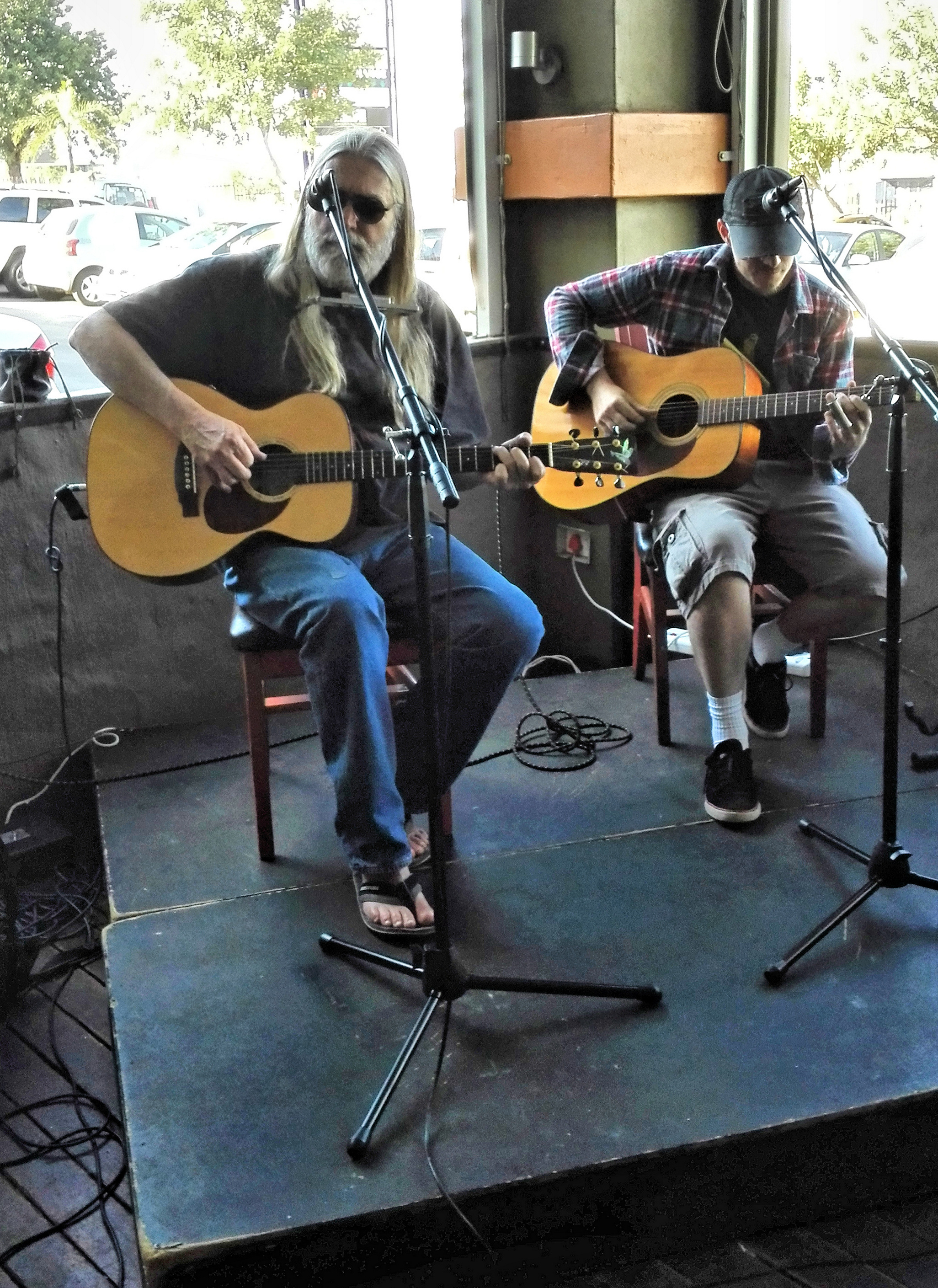
- Piet Botha performing in Pretoria in 2015

Background information
- Born: 18 July 1955
- Died: 2 June 2019 (aged 63)
- Occupation: Rock musician
- Years active: 1974–2019
- Formerly of: Jack Hammer, The Lyzyrd Kyngs, Wildebeest, Akkedis
- Website: http://pietbotha.com

Piet Botha (18 July 1955 – 2 June 2019) was a South African musician and the frontman of the South African rock band Jack Hammer (in which he was known as "The Hammer"), which has been an opening act for bands such as ZZ Top, Deep Purple and Uriah Heep. He also performed solo.

== Biography ==
He was the son of the South African Minister of Foreign Affairs Pik Botha (1932–2018) and the uncle of Roelof Botha, former CFO of PayPal.

Botha went to the US in 1985 to work, but returned to South Africa the next year.

In 2011 Botha appeared in the television series "Wie Lê Waar" (Who Lies Where) on the Afrikaans TV channel kykNET. In the programme he visits the graves of famous Afrikaner icons and tells about their lives. The series led indirectly to the recording and release of "Spookpsalms", Botha's first solo album in eight years.

A documentary about the life of Piet Botha as a musician was released in 2019.

== Death ==
Botha was diagnosed with pancreatic cancer in early 2019, and died on 2 June 2019. He was 63.

== Albums ==
- 'n Suitcase Vol Winter, 1997 WILDEBEEST
  - Donkermaan
  - Sien Jou Weer
  - Marilyn Monroe
  - Suitcase Vol Winter
  - Van Tonder
  - Die Kind
  - Goeienag Generaal
  - Klein Bietjie Reën
  - In Die Transvaal
  - Staan Saam Burgers
  - Gipsey In Jou Oë
  - Kom Huistoe
- Jan Skopgraaf, 1999 WILDEBEEST
  - Jan Skopgraaf
  - Haiku Vir Rooijan
  - Blues Vir Louise
  - Loftus Versfeld
  - Kankerreën
  - Slawereën
  - Allesverloren
  - Van Tonder deel II
  - Boomstraat
  - Laat Die Wiele Rol
  - Riemtelegram
- Die Mamba, 2003 RHYTHM
  - Warm Heuning
  - Bye Bye My Darling
  - Man Met Kitaar
  - Die Mamba
  - O My Heiland
  - Al Die Stede
  - Skielik Somer
  - Die Gemmerbroodman
  - Bordello
  - Bosveldpad
  - Herfsgedagtes
  - Kitty
  - Jacob Klipkop
  - Jeffreysbaai (instrumental)
- Spookpsalms 2011 Wolmer Rekords (independent)

== Gallery ==
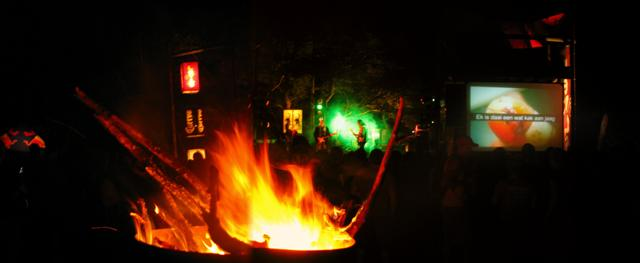
Live set by Piet Botha
