= Escape Dynamics =

Technology Company

Escape Dynamics, Inc.
- Company type: Private
- Founded: 2010
- Defunct: December 31, 2015
- Headquarters: Broomfield, Colorado, USA
- Key people: Dmitriy Richard Starson (CEO and CTO); Laetitia Garriott de Cayeux (President and COO); Andrew Lee (General Counsel); Richard F. Schaden (Chairman of the Board)
- Website: www.escapedynamics.com

Escape Dynamics, Inc. was a Colorado-based technology company that operated 2010–2015 focused on bringing to market single-stage-to-orbit reusable electromagnetically powered spaceplanes.

Although the company demonstrated operation of a prototype thruster with an end-to-end (grid to thruster) sequence of operation of an externally powered propulsion system in 2015, the company ceased operations at the end of 2015 as a result of insufficient funding to complete the requisite R&D process to complete development.

== History ==
The company was founded by Richard F. Schaden and a team of California Institute of Technology scientists including Dr. Dmitriy Richard Starson and Shaun Maguire. Laetitia Garriott de Cayeux joined the founding team as the President and COO in 2014.

Members of the Board of Advisors included Peter Diamandis of the X Prize Foundation, Gonzalo Martinez of Autodesk, Harry Atwater of Caltech, Jonathan Knowles of Autodesk, Ingvar Petursson of Nintendo of America, Joseph Meyerowitz (co-founder of Escape Dynamics), and Shaun Maguire (co-founder of Escape Dynamics) of Caltech and Qadium Inc.

The company ceased operations at the end of 2015, commenting in a statement on their website that, "while microwave propulsion is feasible and is capable of efficiency and performance surpassing chemical rockets, the cost of completing the R&D all the way through operations makes the concept economically unattractive for our team at this time."

== Technology development ==
The key technology areas Escape Dynamics focused on were: i) externally powered aerospace vehicles; ii) efficient, reliable and safe wireless energy transfer; and iii) highly efficient high power microwave sources. Systems the company developed included high power microwave sources (gyrotrons) used to generate microwave energy required to power aerospace vehicles, high-speed steerable phased array antennas for millimeter-wave long distance wireless energy transfer, and electromagnetically powered propulsion systems.

In the summer 2015, the company demonstrated operation of a prototype thruster with specific impulse above 500 seconds using helium as a propellant. The demonstration showed an end-to-end sequence of operation of an externally powered propulsion system. Energy was drawn from the grid, converted into microwaves using EDI's gyrotron, guided through a system of beam shaping mirrors, and beamed from an antenna to a thruster. Conversion of the microwave energy into thrust was performed using a thermal thruster with a highly efficient microwave-absorbing heat exchanger.

== Industry accolades and awards ==
In 2013, the company's work and revolutionary approach to innovation in the aerospace industry was recognized by Autodesk Innovation Award. In 2014 Escape Dynamics was invited to present its vision at the Google Solve for X summit. In the summer 2015, after announcement of the 500 second I_{sp} milestones, the company was featured in the cover story of Aviation Week and featured in Scientific American which listed its beamed-energy propulsion concept as one of ten “2015 World Changing Ideas”. Fast Company Magazine also listed Escape Dynamics in its “World’s 50 Most Innovative Companies 2016” edition as #3 of the World's Most Innovative Companies in the space sector after SpaceX and Blue Origin.
