= Caillou (disambiguation) =

Caillou is a children's television series.

Caillou may also refer to:

- Caillou (book series), the series of books on which the television series is based
- Caillou, an extended-play record by Andrew Wade

== People with the surname ==
- Alan Caillou, the pen name of Alan Lyle-Smythe
- Edmond de Caillou, Gascon night
- Marie Caillou, French graphic artist

== See also ==
- Cailloux, French surname
- Gros Caillou ("Big Pebble"), a landmark in Lyon, France
