= Sequoia Capital =

American venture capital firm

Sequoia Capital Operations, LLC
- Trade name: Sequoia Capital
- Industry: Financial services
- Founded: 1972; 54 years ago
- Founder: Don Valentine
- Headquarters: Menlo Park, California, U.S.
- Area served: United States; Southeast Asia; India; China; Israel
- Key people: Michael Moritz; Douglas Leone; Alfred Lin; Pat Grady
- Services: Venture capital; alternative investments
- AUM: US$56.3 billion (2024)
- Number of employees: 150 (2026)
- Website: sequoiacap.com

Sequoia Capital Operations, LLC, doing business as Sequoia Capital is an American venture capital firm headquartered in Menlo Park, California. It specializes in seed stage, early stage, and growth stage investments in private companies across technology sectors. It is governed by a small general partnership and maintains a workforce of around 150 employees. As of January 2025, the firm had approximately US$56 billion in assets under management (AUM).

Sequoia has made a wide variety of venture investments since inception, including in Apple, ByteDance, and Cisco, among many others.

== History ==
Sequoia was founded by Don Valentine in 1972 in Menlo Park, California, at a time when the state's venture capital industry was just beginning to develop. Sequoia formed its first venture capital fund in 1974, and was an early investor in Atari the next year. In 1978, Sequoia became one of the first investors in Apple. Partners Doug Leone and Michael Moritz assumed leadership of the firm in 1996.

In 1999, Sequoia established a dedicated investment fund for Israeli startups. In 2005, Sequoia Capital China was established, later followed by Sequoia Capital India. In 2012, Moritz took a step back from the day-to-day operations of the firm. Leone became Global Managing Partner. Jim Goetz led Sequoia's U.S. business from 2012 until 2017, when he was succeeded by Roelof Botha. In 2016, Sequoia hired Jess Lee, making her the first female investing partner in the United States in the firm's history. In 2019, it was the most active VC fund company in India.

In March 2020, Sequoia announced it would hire Luciana Lixandru as its first partner based in Europe. In October 2021, Sequoia announced it would implement a new fund structure for its U.S. and European business that would allow it to remain involved with companies after their public market debuts. In March 2022, The Information reported that Sequoia Capital China was raising an $8 billion fund to invest in Chinese tech companies. Following the collapse of Silicon Valley Bank in March 2023, the Federal Deposit Insurance Corporation had backstopped Sequoia's $1 billion in deposits in the bank.

In June 2023, Sequoia announced plans to break up into three entities citing complications running a decentralized global investment business in the middle of geopolitical tensions. Following the separation, expected to complete by March 2024, the Chinese business led by Neil Shen would be called HongShan ("sequoia" in Mandarin) and the Indian and Southeast Asia arm would be named Peak XV Partners led by Shailendra Singh, GV Ravishankar, Mohit Bhatnagar, and Rajan Anandan. The U.S. and Europe unit would retain the Sequoia name. In July 2023, Sequoia announced to cut one-third of its talent staff as part of an organizational restructuring. In October 2023, the U.S. House Committee on U.S.–China Competition announced a probe into Sequoia Capital's investments in China.

As of at least 2024, Sequoia is the largest investor in China's consumer internet sector. It has often used a strategy of investing in several competitors in the same sector and then later pushing for their consolidation. According to Chinese media, Sequoia was one of the major influences in mergers between Meituan and Dianping, between Uber China and Didi, and between VShop and Lefenghui.

In July 2025, Sequoia partner Shaun Maguire stated that Zohran Mamdani, a Muslim American New York City mayoral candidate, "came from a culture that lies about everything" and seeks to advance "his Islamist agenda". That statement was denounced as bigoted and Islamophobic. However, Maguire denied any bigoted instead—he emphasized a distinction between Islamism and Islam. In response, 600 founders of tech startups signed an open letter to Sequoia, asking Sequoia to adopt "a zero-tolerance policy on hate speech and religious bigotry." In August 2025, Sequoia's COO, Sumaiya Balbale, who is open about the influence of her Muslim faith on her career, resigned after five years with the company over Maguire's posts after other senior partners declined to take action against Maguire on the basis of free speech.

In November 2025, Alfred Lin and Pat Grady succeeded Roelof Botha as co-stewards, Sequoia's title for its top leaders under a stewardship model dating to founder Don Valentine. Botha stepped down after partners dissatisfied with his leadership pushed for the change. Lin, Grady, and fellow partner Andrew Reed led the effort with the backing of the wider partnership and former leader Doug Leone, the Financial Times reported.

In November 2026, Sequoia announced a reorganization that merged its early-stage and growth investment teams, reduced hierarchy within its partnership, and closed its London office. Sequoia's London office, opened in 2020, had served as the firm's European base. The firm said it saw no need for a local presence in Europe and would continue investing in European startups from the San Francisco Bay Area. According to the Financial Times, the closure meant Sequoia had "in effect exited all overseas markets," following the earlier separation of its China and India businesses into independent firms.

== Investments ==
Investors, referred to as limited partners, contribute money to a fund that the firm's general partners then invest in business ventures. Its limited partners have primarily been university endowments, charitable foundations, and other large institutions. Sequoia specializes in seed stage, early stage, and growth stage investments in private technology companies, including those in the AI, consumer internet, cybersecurity, crypto, financial services, healthcare, reindustrialization, and robotics sectors. The firm has been often recognized for its strong track record of early investments. The firm has also distinguished itself from other top venture capital firms by diversifying its investments and not just focusing on U.S. early-stage venture capital. Sequoia is an umbrella brand for three different venture entities: one focused on the U.S. and Europe, another on India and Southeast Asia, and a third on China. Following the June 2023 announcement to make the three entities independent, from 2024 the ventures would no longer share investors or profits.

A notable opportunity missed by Sequoia was the failure to invest in Facebook in its early days c. 2005; John Naughton suggested that this failure led to "fear of missing out" and may have contributed to Sequoia's investing heavily in FTX in 2022, prior to its collapse in 2023.

In May 2016, Sequoia Capital invested $1 million in Indian tax-filing startup ClearTax, as part of the company's $2 million seed round. In 2019, Hurun Research Institute identified Sequoia as the world's top unicorn investor, noting it had invested in one in five of all private companies valued at $1 billion or more. In July 2021, Sequoia published a piece about "the Latin American startup opportunity" that signaled it would increase its focus there.

In October 2021, Sequoia announced the Sequoia Capital Fund, a new fund structure for its U.S. and European business. The fund structure is unique for VC funds as they are typically funds with a 10-year fund cycle instead of an open-ended evergreen fund. The Sequoia fund will no longer need to sell or distribute stock as in the usual VC fund cycle. Instead, limited partners who want liquidity can pull money out of the fund. Sequoia also announced it would become a RIA which would allow the firm more flexibility in its investments. In February 2022, Sequoia raised a $600 million Sequoia Crypto Fund. As one of the first sub-funds of Sequoia Capital Fund, the crypto fund will mainly invest in cryptocurrencies traded on third-party exchanges.

In June 2022, Sequoia announced that it had raised $2.85 billion in additional funds to invest in India and Southeast Asia. The amount of funds raised is also the largest to date for the company in both India and Southeast Asia. In early 2023, the size of Sequoia Capital Fund reached $13.6 billion.

Sequoia Capital along with other notable venture capital investors made an investment in the cryptocurrency exchange FTX, founded by Sam Bankman-Fried. Sequoia published an article which was a tribute to Bankman-Fried on its website in 2022. FTX failed a year later in 2023, with about $8 billion of investors' money missing, and Bankman-Fried was convicted of fraud. The value of Sequoia's investment in FTX was ultimately written down to $0; it is estimated that they lost $214 million on their investment. The company released a notice to investors, stating that their stake in FTX represented a small amount of their investment portfolio. They also removed the profile of Bankman-Fried from their website.

In July 2023, it reduced the size of its cryptocurrency fund from $585 million to $200 million, and shifted focus to young start-ups after an industry crash. In 2023, Sequoia launched its Open Source Fellowship to fund up to three open source developers annually via an equity-free fellowship.

Notable investments
Year	Companies
2020s	Anthropic, BitClout, Bolt, Citadel Securities, ElevenLabs, FTX, Harvey, Kalshi, Loom, OpenAI, OpenEvidence, Shein, StrongDM, Wiz,
2010s	23andMe, ByteDance, Figma, Instacart, Klarna, Nubank, Pinduoduo, Snowflake, SpaceX, StarkWare Industries, Stripe, UiPath, WhatsApp
2000s	Airbnb, Palo Alto Networks, ServiceNow, Unity Technologies, YouTube
1970s–1990s	Apple, Cisco, Google, Nvidia, Webvan

== Programs ==
In 2009, Sequoia started a scout program in which founders, initially drawn mostly from its own portfolio companies, received up to $100,000 of the firm's capital to invest in early-stage startups. According to TechCrunch, Sequoia was the first venture capital firm to use scouts, and many other firms later started similar programs. By 2021, Sequoia's scouts had backed more than 1,100 startups on the firm's behalf. In late 2020, Sequoia extended the program to Europe, where its first cohort comprised about two dozen scouts in several countries. In 2021, Sequoia partnered on the BLCK VC Scout Network to provide training and education to Black scouts.

In 2022, Sequoia launched Arc, a program for early-stage founders in Europe and the U.S., led by partners Jess Lee and Luciana Lixandru. Four years later, in 2026, Sequoia wound down both Arc and the scout program as part of a broader reorganization.

== See also ==
- List of venture capital firms
- History of Silicon Valley
