= Sean Hughes =

Sean Hughes may refer to:

- Sean Hughes (boxer) (born 1982), English boxer
- Sean Hughes (comedian) (1965–2017), English-born Irish stand-up comedian, writer and actor
- Sean Hughes (Irish republican), alleged IRA member
- Sean Hughes (politician) (1946–1990), British Labour Party Member of Parliament, 1983–1990
- Sean P. F. Hughes (1941–2025), British professor of orthopaedic surgery
- Sean Hughes, bassist with Green Day

== See also ==
- Shaun M. Hughes, Australian astronomer
- Hughes (surname)
- List of people with given name Sean
