= Shaun Maguire =

American venture capitalist (born 1985)

- Born: 1985 (age 40–41); California, United States
- Education: Stanford University, and Caltech
- Occupations: Venture capitalist, political activist
- Known for: Partner at Sequoia Capital

Shaun Maguire (born 1985) is an American venture capitalist and political activist who is a partner at Sequoia Capital. Before joining Sequoia in 2019, he was a partner at GV and co-founded the cybersecurity company Expanse, which was acquired by Palo Alto Networks in 2020.

== Early life and education ==
In an interview with the Caltech Heritage Project, Maguire reported that he earned a 1.8 GPA in high school and failed his Algebra 2 course, and that his admission to University of Southern California depended on letters of recommendation. Maguire received his PhD in physics from Caltech.

== Career ==
In 2010, Maguire cofounded Escape Dynamics. He later worked at DARPA, including a deployment to Afghanistan as a civilian contractor.

In 2012, Maguire co-founded cyber firm Expanse (previously called Qadium), which was acquired by Palo Alto Networks in 2020 for over $1 billion.

Maguire joined Google Ventures in 2016, where he worked for three years, before leaving for Sequoia Capital in 2019.

== Political activity and controversies ==
Maguire served as an advisor to President Donald Trump in his second term, assisting with intelligence community picks. Maguire manages the investments of Sequoia Capital in Elon Musk's companies, including SpaceX, The Boring Company, xAI, and X, and assisted Musk during his tenure at DOGE. Maguire supported Trump during the 2024 election.

=== Mamdani comments ===
On July 4, 2025, Maguire posted on X that New York City mayoral candidate Zohran Mamdani "...comes from a culture that lies about everything. It's literally a virtue to lie if it advances his Islamist agenda. The West will learn this lesson the hard way." Maguire's comments were widely criticized as racist and Islamophobic, including by Dilawar Syed, former deputy administrator of the United States Small Business Administration. Saudi entrepreneur Hisham Al-Falih criticized Maguire's comments, describing them as "appalling".

Maguire defended his post on July 7, 2025, after which a petition signed by 900 tech leaders was circulated calling for Sequoia Capital to apologize for, condemn, and investigate Maguire's comments. Supporters issued an open letter in defense of Maguire on July 8, 2025.

In the aftermath of the controversy, Sequoia's COO Sumaiya Balbale, a practicing Muslim, resigned in August 2025. According to the Financial Times, Maguire's remarks not only strained the firm's relations with its Middle Eastern investors but were also described by Balbale as "Islamophobic". Roelof Botha, Sequoia's former managing partner, defended Maguire's comments in an October 2025 interview with TechCrunch.

=== Israel ===
Maguire identifies as a Zionist. Maguire defended the Israeli government's response to the 2023 October 7 attacks, and spoke about what he described as rising antisemitism. Maguire has promoted the Pallywood conspiracy theory, which falsely claims that Palestinians are faking scenes of suffering and death. In July 2025, he attempted to cast doubt on the Gaza Strip aid distribution killings.

In a September 2025 interview at the Jerusalem Post Diplomatic Conference, he said, "One reason Americans should care is because Israel is essentially on the front lines defending Western values and democracy."

==== Brown University shooting conspiracy theory ====
After the 2025 Brown University shooting, Maguire spread a conspiracy theory on social media inaccurately identifying a Palestinian student at Brown University as the perpetrator. Maguire said there was "very strong evidence" that this student was the shooter, and inaccurately claimed that an MIT professor who was also killed was targeted because he was Jewish. A different individual, Claudio Manuel Neves Valente, was subsequently identified as the shooter. Maguire then deleted his posts on the shooting.

On December 19, 2025, Council on American–Islamic Relations (CAIR) National Deputy Director Edward Ahmed Mitchell released a statement condemning Maguire, writing "We strongly condemn anti-Muslim, pro-Israel extremists who rushed to blame the recent campus shooting on an innocent Brown University student who is Muslim and an advocate for Palestinian human rights. The remarks that Shaun Maguire and other bigots made about this student were irresponsible, dangerous, and, sadly, predictable."

== Personal life ==
In 2018, Maguire married his Iranian Jewish wife in Israel and subsequently added Cohn as his last name.
