= Sean Carroll =

Sean Carroll may refer to:

- Sean B. Carroll (born 1960), American biologist
- Sean M. Carroll (born 1966), American physicist
- Seán Carroll (1892–1954), Irish Sinn Féin politician
- Sean Carroll (police officer), involved in the 1999 shooting of Amadou Diallo
