= Sean Michaels =

Sean Michaels may refer to:

- Sean Michaels (actor) (born 1958), American pornographic actor
- Sean Michaels (writer) (born 1982), Scottish-Canadian novelist, music journalist and blogger
- Shawn Michaels (born 1965), American professional wrestler

== See also ==
- Sean Michael (born 1969), South African actor, writer and singer
