= Sean Johnson =

Sean, Shaun or Shawn Johnson may refer to:

- Sean Johnson (soccer) (born 1989), American soccer player
- Sean Johnson (bowls) (born 1972), New Zealand lawn bowler
- Sean C. Johnson, American Christian musician
- Sean Cw Johnson, American actor known for Power Rangers Lightspeed Rescue
- Shaun Johnson (born 1990), New Zealand rugby league player
- Shawn Johnson East (born 1992), née Johnson, American gymnast
- Sean 'Sweet' Johnson, Grand Theft Auto video game character
- Shaun Johnson (singer), American singer
- Shawn Johnson (footballer) (born 2003), Costa Rican footballer

== See also ==
- LeShon Johnson (born 1971), American football player
- Sean Johnston, Canadian writer
- Shaun Johnston, Canadian actor
