= Sean McDermott (rugby union) =

Irish rugby union player

- Full name: Sean Joseph McDermott
- Born: 28 March 1932 Kinsale, Co. Cork, Ireland

Rugby union career
- Position: Scrum-half
International career
Years	Team	Apps	(Points)
1955	Ireland	2	(0)

Sean Joseph McDermott (born 28 March 1932) is an Irish former international rugby union player.

== Biography ==
Born in Kinsale, County Cork, McDermott was selected by Ireland from London Irish in 1955, replacing Johnny O'Meara for their final two Five Nations fixtures against Scotland and Wales. Usual stand-off Jack Kyle had also been dropped and McDermott formed a new half-back combination with Seamus Kelly.

McDermott served as captain of the Sussex representative side. He also ascended to the captaincy of London Irish, but quit the club over a dispute with their secretary, regarding not being consulted about team selection.

== See also ==
- List of Ireland national rugby union players
