= Sean McKenna =

Sean McKenna may refer to:

- Sean McKenna (ice hockey) (born 1962), former professional ice hockey player
- Sean McKenna (footballer) (born 1987), Scottish footballer
- Shaun McKenna (born 1957), English writer
- Sean McKenna (cyclist) (born 1994), Irish cyclist
