= Sean Mackin =

Sean/Seán Mackin may refer to:

- Seán Mackin (Irish republican), Northern Irish activist, fundraiser for the Friends of Sinn Féin
- Sean Mackin (musician) (born 1979), American musician for the pop punk band Yellowcard
- Sean Mackin, a fictional character from the Derek Landy novel Skulduggery Pleasant: Kingdom of the Wicked
