= Alfred Lin =

American businessman (born 1972)

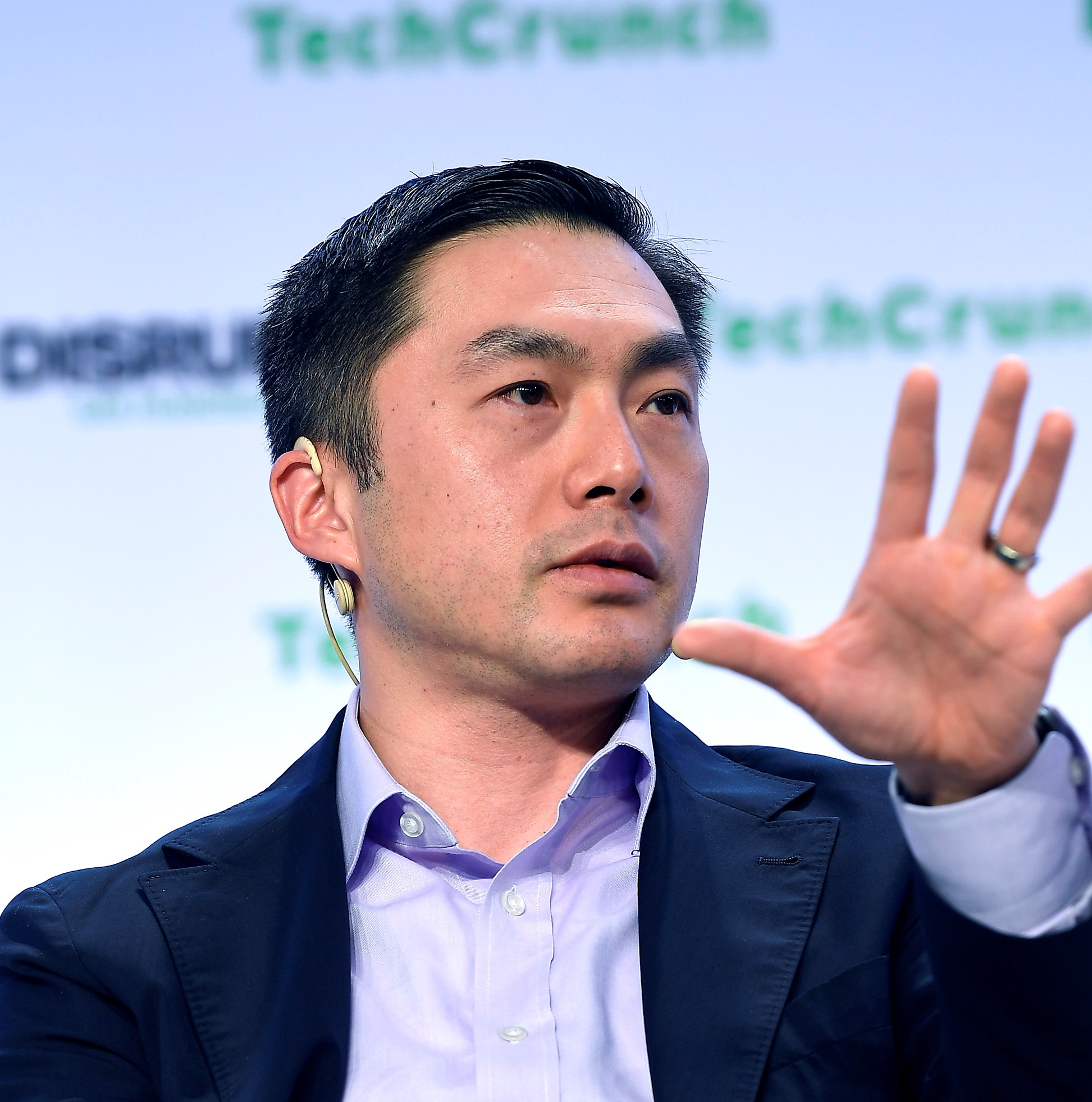
- Lin in 2019
- Born: 1972 (age 53–54); Taiwan
- Education: Harvard University (BA); Stanford University (MS)
- Occupation: Partner at Sequoia Capital
- Spouse: Rebecca Lin
- Children: 1

Alfred Lin (Chinese: 林君叡; born 1972) is a Taiwanese-American venture capitalist who has served as the managing partner of Sequoia Capital since 2025. He joined Sequoia in 2010 as partner, later taking over global investment operations alongside Pat Grady.

Lin was the COO, CFO, and chairman of online retailer Zappos from 2005 to 2010.

== Early life and education ==
Lin was born in Taiwan. At the age of six, his parents immigrated to New York, where Lin attended Stuyvesant High School. He then graduated from Harvard University with a bachelor's degree in applied mathematics and earned a master's degree in statistics from Stanford University.

== Career ==
While at Harvard, Lin met Tony Hsieh, the future CEO of Zappos. Hsieh first recognized Lin's business acumen while running a student-owned pizza parlor at Harvard. Lin, his best customer, was buying whole pizzas, splitting them into slices, and selling them for a profit. In 1996, Lin dropped out of a Ph.D. program at Stanford to join Hsieh, Sanjay Mandan, and Ali Partovi at LinkExchange as CFO. 18 months later LinkExchange sold to Microsoft for $265 million. Later, before joining Zappos, Lin was the VP of Finance and Business Development of Tellme Networks (MSFT). With Tony Hsieh he also co-founded Venture Frogs, an incubator and investment firm. Venture Frogs invested in a variety of tech and Internet startups, including Ask Jeeves, OpenTable, Tellme Networks, and Zappos.

From 2005 to 2010, Lin was chairman, COO, and CFO. At Zappos, Lin was responsible for all financial, administrative, and warehouse operations. He was also responsible for company growth and scaling, bringing the company to its first profitable year in 2006 and to Amazon.com's acquisition of the company in 2009 for $1.2 billion. According to TechCrunch, "Hsieh made at least $214 million; Lin made at least $18 million, with the Venture Frogs shares netting an additional $163 million."

Lin left Zappos in 2010 to join the venture capital firm Sequoia Capital as a partner.

=== Sequoia Capital ===
TechCrunch has stated that Alfred has the "Midas touch", since "every company he's worked for has been acquired, and the smallest deal was $265 million." Lin later helped Tellme Networks which was sold to Microsoft for $800 million. After that, Lin helped form Zappos to later be acquired by Amazon for $1.2 billion. Lin has invested in Airbnb, Achievers, Stella & Dot, Houzz, Humble Bundle, Kiwi, Romotive, Moovit, Styleseat, Uber, and Cardpool (acquired by Blackhawk Networks), AppBistro / MMTG Labs (acquired by InMobi), and SalesCrunch (acquired by ClearSlide). He specializes in consumer internet, enterprise and mobile companies.

Lin was an early investor in Zipline, a medicine drone delivery company with operations in Rwanda. He also invested in the Palo Alto-based security company Cobalt Robotics, and sits on its board of directors. In 2021, Lin made a failed investment on FTX and represented Sequoia on its advisory board.

In November 2025, Lin was appointed the managing partner of Sequoia, to serve jointly with Pat Grady, succeeding Roelof Botha.

== Recognition ==
In 2013, Forbes named Lin as one of the "30 Most Influential People in Tech". Lin and his work have been profiled in national publications, including The Wall Street Journal, The New York Times, Harvard Business Review, Forbes, BusinessWeek, and Fortune, as well as CNBC.
