= Sean Spencer =

Sean, Shaun or Shawn Spencer may refer to:

- Sean Spencer (baseball) (born 1975), American baseball reliever
- Sean Spencer (fighter) (born 1987), American mixed martial artist
- Sean Spencer (Emmerdale), a fictional character from Emmerdale
- Sean Spencer (American football) (born 1970), American football coach and former player
- Shawn Spencer, a fictional character from Psych

== See also ==
- Sean Spence (born 1990), American football linebacker
- Shaun Spence (born 1991), Australian rugby footballer
