= Seán Dunne =

Seán Dunne may refer to:

- Seán Dunne (politician) (1918–1969), Irish Labour Party politician
- Seán Dunne (poet) (1956–1995), Irish poet
- Seán Dunne (businessman) (born 1954), Irish businessman

== See also ==
- Sean Dunn, American man acquitted of assault for throwing a sandwich at a United States federal agent
