= Sean McCann =

Sean McCann may refer to:

- Sean McCann (actor) (1935 – 2019), Canadian television actor
- Sean McCann (ice hockey) (born 1971), Canadian ice hockey coach and former All-American for Harvard.
- Séan McCann (musician) (born 1967), Canadian, member of Great Big Sea and Sean McCann & The Committed
- Sean McCann (politician) (born 1971), Michigan politician
- Sean McCann (Irish Army general) (born 1950), Irish Defence Forces Chief of Staff
- Sean McCann (swimmer) (born 2005), British swimmer
