= Seán White =

Irish hurler

Personal information
- Native name: Seán de Faoite (Irish)
- Born: Banagher, County Offaly, Ireland

Sport
- Sport: Hurling
- Position: Left wing-forward
Club
- Years: Club
- St Rynagh's
Club titles
- Leinster titles: 1
Inter-county*
Years	County	Apps (scores)
1981–1982	Offaly	0 (0-00)
Inter-county titles
- Leinster titles: 0
- All-Irelands: 0
- NHL: 0
- All Stars: 0
- *Inter County team apps and scores correct as of 20:22, 30 June 2014.

Seán White is an Irish former hurler who played as a left wing-forward for the Offaly senior team.

Born in Banagher, County Offaly, White first played competitive hurling in his youth. He made his senior debut for Offaly during the 1981–82 National League, and played for just one season. During his brief career he experienced little success.

At club level White is a one-time Leinster medallist with St Rynagh's. He also won numerous championship medals with the club.

== Honours ==
St Rynagh's

- Leinster Senior Club Hurling Championship (1): 1982 (c)
