= Seán Treacy (disambiguation) =

Seán Treacy (1895–1920) was an Irish Republican Army leader during the Irish War of Independence.

Seán Treacy may also refer to:

- Seán Treacy (politician) (1923–2018), former Irish politician
- Seán Treacy (Galway hurler) (born 1965), Irish retired hurler
- Seán Treacy (Dublin hurler) (born 1995), Irish hurler

== See also ==
- Sean Tracey (born 1980), American baseball player
- Sean Tracy (born 1963), New Zealand cricketer
