= Sean Moore =

Sean Moore may refer to:

- Seán Moore (Irish politician) (1913–1986), Irish Fianna Fáil politician
- Seán Moore (Gaelic footballer)
- Sean Moore (musician) (born 1968), musician with the Welsh rock band Manic Street Preachers
- Sean A. Moore (1965–1998), American fantasy and science fiction writer
- Seann Miley Moore, singer
- Sean Moore (footballer), Irish footballer

== See also ==
- Shawn Moore, American football player
