= Sean Mannion =

Sean Mannion may refer to:

- Sean Mannion (boxer) (born 1956), Irish boxer
- Sean Mannion (American football) (born 1992), American football quarterback
