= Sean Morrison =

Sean Morrison may refer to:

- Sean J. Morrison, American biology professor
- Sean M. Morrison, Cook County commissioner
- Sean Morrison (beach volleyball) (born 1983), beach volleyball and volleyball player from Trinidad and Tobago
- Sean Morrison (footballer) (born 1991), English footballer for Rotherham United
- Sean Morrison (New Hampshire politician)
