= Sean O'Grady =

Sean O'Grady may refer to:

- Sean O'Grady (boxer) (born 1959), World Boxing Association Lightweight Champion
- Seán O'Grady (politician) (1889–1966), Irish Fianna Fáil politician, TD for Clare, 1932–1951
- Sean O'Grady (athlete), Paralympic athlete from Ireland
