= Sean Flynn =

Sean Flynn may refer to:

- Sean Flynn (actor) (born 1989), American actor and musician
- Sean Flynn (cyclist) (born 2000), Scottish cyclist
- Sean Flynn (footballer) (born 1968), English footballer
- Sean Flynn (photojournalist) (born 1941, disappeared 1970), American actor and photojournalist, son of Errol Flynn
  - "Sean Flynn" (song), a song by The Clash about the photojournalist

== See also ==
- Sean
- Flynn (surname)
