= Sean M. Sullivan =

Current position
- Title: Athletic director
- Team: Catholic University
- Conference: Landmark Conference

Biographical details
- Education: University of California, Santa Cruz

Playing career
- 1988–91: University of California, Santa Cruz

Coaching career (HC unless noted)
- 1991–96: University of California, Santa Cruz

Administrative career (AD unless noted)
- 2000–01: University of California, Santa Cruz
- 1990–92: University of California, San Francisco (director of recreational sports)
- 2002–04: Boston College (manager of intramural sports, camps, and clinics)
- 2004–11: York College of Pennsylvania
- 2011–13: Clark University
- 2013: Catholic University

Sean M. Sullivan is a former college soccer player and currently the athletic director at The Catholic University of America in Washington, D.C., where he replaced Michael S. Allen.

== Playing career ==
He played college soccer for four seasons (1988, 1989, 1990 and 1991) at University of California, Santa Cruz, and was named a regional All-American in 1991.

== Coaching career ==
Sullivan was the head men's soccer coach at the University of California, Santa Cruz (1991–1996).

== Athletic director ==
He was interim director of athletics at the University of California, Santa Cruz (2000–2001) before holding the AD post at York College of Pennsylvania from 2004 to 2011. During the 2011–12 and 2012–13 seasons, Sullivan was director of athletics and recreation at Clark University, and September 24, 2013, he was named associate vice president and director of athletics at The Catholic University of America, effective November 19.
