= Sean Hill (writer) =

American writer and video game developer

- Born: Austin, Texas
- Occupations: Writer, video game developer, improviser
- Writing career
- Genres: Flash fiction, Twitterature
- Notable work: Very Short Stories: 300 Bite-Size Works of Fiction

Sean Hill is an American writer, entrepreneur, improviser and former video game developer. He worked as a programmer, designer, and producer in the computer game industry.

== Technology career ==
Hill's early game credits include GATO and the 1986 space simulation Orbiter. On Orbiter, he worked with Gordon Walton, Don Gilman, and Mike Jones. The four went on to form Digital Illusions, a company that developed computer-game simulations.

For Sub Battle Simulator, Digital Illusions looked at earlier submarine games, including GATO and Silent Service. The team wanted gameplay to reflect the demands of submarine warfare without having to fight the controls as well.

Epyx agreed to publish the game, but completing it was an ordeal. Epyx put in about 900 hours of playtesting before bringing the team to California, where they worked in a trailer in an empty warehouse. Ducks and geese found their way in, so they bought a small pool and food for them, to keep them outside.

A review of Sub Battle Simulator in ST-Log liked the precision and realism of the finished game, as well as the accessible interface. Next, Digital Illusions made PT-109, a naval simulation whose weather, lighting, and combat drew praise from Computer Gaming World. Hill programmed the Macintosh II version of Tetris. He was among the developers who gathered at Chris Crawford's California home for the first Computer Game Developers Conference.

Hill founded Top Dog Software in San Francisco around 1990, before moving operations to Austin, although it still maintained an office and four employees in San Francisco. Top Dog made original games, and converted others for Macintosh, PlayStation, and Sega Saturn. Square hired the company for a Windows 95 version of Final Fantasy V. That project was canceled before completion. He closed Top Dog after approximately 15 years in the computer-game industry.

=== Selected game credits ===
Game credits include:

- 1984 – GATO (Macintosh), development credit.
- 1986 – GATO (Atari ST), programming; Orbiter (DOS), design and programming.
- 1987 – Sub Battle Simulator (DOS), lead design and programming; Atari ST conversion programming.
- 1988 – PT-109 (DOS), design and testing; Tetris (Macintosh II), programming; Sub Battle Simulator (Amiga), design.
- 1995 – Where in the World Is Carmen Sandiego? (CD-ROM, Macintosh), programming.
- 1996 – TriTryst (Macintosh), executive producer.

== Improvisational theatre ==
Hill's early improv experience came as a performer with Bay Area TheatreSports, where he studied with Keith Johnstone. He adopted this work as his approach to improvisation, when he organized Austin TheatreSports. He was the company's co-founder and artistic director. In the early days he was the primary teacher, teaching beginning, intermediate, and performance classes.

Before founding the Hideout Theatre, Hill performed as a member of Monks' Night Out, the house improvisational troupe at Austin's Velveeta Room. Hill then formed his own troupe, We Could Be Heroes, and co-directed the troupe with fellow Monks' Night Out member David Lampe. Since the troupe didn't have a theatre of its own, the group performed at Hyde Park.

Hill directed and performed with Austin TheatreSports in Gorilla Theatre at the Public Domain Theatre. In a review for the Austin American-Statesman, Kendall Klym described Hill performing and singled out his directing. Hill had the cast improvise a story in reverse and another that culminated in a character's death within sixty seconds.

Shana Merlin successfully auditioned after performing with her first Austin troupe, Los Paranoias. Hill and Merlin's work together led to the opening of the Hideout Theatre in downtown Austin. We Could Be Heroes later became Heroes of Comedy.

Hill and Merlin opened the Hideout in 1999, taking over an old commercial space at 617 Congress Avenue. They did much of the work themselves, turning it into two performance rooms, classrooms, and a coffeehouse. Austin improvisers now had a place to rehearse, take classes, and put on shows. Hill also brought along an idea from his San Francisco TheatreSports days. Start Trekkin’, a Star Trek improv show, was later revived by the Hideout's resident troupe, Heroes of Comedy, in 2005.

After Monks' Night Out disbanded in the 2000s, the Hideout remained one of the few active venues for improvisational and sketch comedy in Austin, providing stage time for other companies. Hill asked Andy Crouch, who had worked with him in Heroes of Comedy, to help manage the theatre. Crouch introduced Friday-night performances featuring two troupes and encouraged performers to return to the stage. Hill later credited him with helping shift Austin's improv scene away from individual venues and toward collaboration among troupes.

Hill's directing emphasized relationships between characters rather than the mechanics of a scene. Merlin later recalled a rehearsal in which performers became distracted by a missing umbrella. Hill stopped them and insisted that the scene was about the relationships between the characters, not the umbrella. He asked the actors to consider what their characters wanted from each other and show it through their actions.

New management took over the Hideout's improv operation in 2009. Hill remained involved with its productions, such as performing with longtime colleagues in the Hideout's Sci-Fi Comedy Double Feature, improvising episodes modeled on The Twilight Zone and Star Trek.

He later returned for an All-Star Theatresports performance during the theatre's fifteenth-anniversary celebration, alongside fellow veterans David Lampe, Shana Merlin, Craig Kotfas, Lauren Zinn Buck, and Kacey Samiee.

== Writing career ==
Hill began Very Short Story on Twitter in 2009, borrowing an idea from improvisational comedy. Readers sent him nouns, and he used them to make stories of no more than 140 characters. One had a cow convince a farmer it was a dog by fetching a ball. Hill put his number of followers at roughly 95,000 in 2012.

A writer who discovered the feed helped Hill find a literary agent, and a book deal followed with Ulysses Press, which released Very Short Stories: 300 Bite-Size Works of Fiction in 2011. The book collected 300 of the Twitter stories, leaving them untitled but arranging them into sections covering relationships, family, work, and other subjects. Some had illustrations. The pieces ranged from complete miniature narratives to short comic tales. Hill followed up with Smash the Hammer: 250-Word Stories, a collection of 50 longer pieces.

The book changed the way readers encountered the stories. On Twitter, each had appeared without a title or subject label. The printed version placed them under section headings, giving the same fiction a different context. Ashley Chantler enjoyed some of Hill's stories but questioned whether Twitter fiction could become little more than a succession of jokes.
