= Sean Power =

Sean Power or Seán Power may refer to:

- Seán Power (politician) (born 1960), Irish Fianna Fáil politician, TD for Kildare South
- Sean Power (Jersey) (born 1955), Deputy for St Brelade District #2, Jersey
- Sean Power (actor) (born 1974), American actor, writer and director
- Sean Power (hurler), Irish hurler
