= Seán O'Connor =

Sean O'Connor may refer to:

- Seán O'Connor (businessman) (born 1960), Irish businessman and political activist
- Sean O'Connor (comedian) (born 1985), American comedian and writer
- Sean O'Connor (footballer) (born 1981), former English footballer mainly with Queen of the South
- Sean O'Connor (ice hockey) (born 1981), Canadian professional ice hockey player
- Seán O'Connor (Irish footballer) (born 1983), former Irish footballer
- Seán O'Connor (hurler) (born 1981), Irish hurler
- Sean O'Connor (producer) (born 1968), British producer, writer and director
- Seán O'Connor (rugby union) (born 1996), Irish rugby union player
- Seán O'Connor (sports administrator) (1935–2018), Irish hurler and Gaelic games referee and administrator
- Seán O'Connor (wrestler) (born 1937), Irish Olympic wrestler

== See also ==
- Sean Connor (born 1967), footballer
