= Seán Farrell (hurler) =

Irish hurler

Personal information
- Native name: Seán Ó Fearail (Irish)
- Born: 1954 (age 71–72) Watergrasshill, County Cork, Ireland

Sport
- Sport: Hurling
- Position: Midfield
Club
- Years: Club
- Watergrasshill
Club titles
- Cork titles: 0

Seán Farrell (born 1954) is an Irish hurler who played as a midfielder for the Cork minor and under-21 hurling teams.

Born in Watergrasshill, County Cork, Farrell first arrived on the inter-county scene at the age of seventeen when he first linked up with the Cork minor team, before later joining the under-21 side. A provincial medallist in both grades, Farrell never made the step up to the senior grade with Cork.

At club level Farrell won one championship medal with Watergrasshill in the junior grade.

In retirement from playing, Farrell became involved in team management and coaching. After serving as manager of Sarsfield's he joined the Down senior hurling team as assistant manager in 2006, eventually becoming manager.

Sporting positions
Preceded by John Crossey	Down Senior Hurling Manager; 2006	Succeeded by Gerald Coulter
