= Sean Russell =

Sean Russell may refer to:

- Seán Russell (1893–1940), Irish republican
- Sean Russell (author) (born 1952), Canadian author of fantasy literature and historical novels
- Sean Russell (rugby league) (born 2002), Australian rugby league footballer
