= Sean Kelly (integral theorist) =

Canadian integral theorist (born 1957)

Sean Kelly (born 1957) is a Canadian environmental philosopher, academic, and integral theorist. He introduced the concept of complex holism and has written on planetary and ecological thought. He has also translated the work of French philosopher of complexity Edgar Morin for English-language audiences. Since 1997, Kelly has taught in the Philosophy, Cosmology, and Consciousness (PCC) program at the California Institute of Integral Studies (CIIS) in San Francisco.

Kelly's scholarship explores the evolution of consciousness in the context of planetary crisis, drawing on German Idealism, depth psychology, complexity theory, and ecological philosophy. His work addresses the ethical, psychological, and spiritual dimensions of global ecological disruption and engages themes such as the Planetary Era, integral ecology, and civilizational transformation.

== Early life and education ==
Kelly was born in 1957 in the Ottawa Valley, Canada, to Irish- and French-Canadian parents. He completed undergraduate studies in English literature and Religion as well as a Master's degree in Religion at Carleton University, with a thesis on Gnosticism and Jungian psychology.

He completed a Ph.D. at the University of Ottawa, specializing in Hegel and transpersonal psychology. During the mid-1980s, Kelly received a grant from the French government to work in Paris with Edgar Morin. During this period, he also entered into dialogue with physicist and philosopher David Bohm, whose work became another influence on his thinking.

== Intellectual work and contributions ==
=== Hegel, Jung, and complex holism ===
Kelly first articulated the concept of complex holism in Individuation and the Absolute: Hegel, Jung, and the Path toward Wholeness. It sought to mediate between the two figures through a "complex-holistic" understanding of the self as "dialectically self-articulating totality". The book has been discussed and cited across disciplines, including analytical psychology, philosophy, religious studies, and systems theory.

=== Transpersonal theory and dialogue ===
Throughout the 1990s and early 2000s, Kelly contributed to debates within transpersonal psychology, engaging critically with the work of Ken Wilber while also drawing on Jung, Bohm, and Morin. He co-edited Ken Wilber in Dialogue: Conversations with Leading Transpersonal Thinkers, a volume bringing together critical and constructive engagements with Wilber's hierarchical theory of psychospiritual development. Kelly also co-edited, with Richard Tarnas, Psyche Unbound: Essays in Honor of Stanislav Grof, a festschrift marking Grof's 90th birthday.

=== Integral ecology and planetary thought ===
From the 2000s onward, Kelly's work increasingly focused on the ecological crisis and the emergence of what he describes as the Planetary Era, a term derived from Morin. With Sam Mickey and Adam Robbert, he co-edited Integral Ecologies: Nature, Culture, and Knowledge in the Planetary Era.

Kelly collaborated for many years with deep ecologist, systems thinker, Buddhist teacher, and activist Joanna Macy. Kelly and Macy co-taught courses at the California Institute of Integral Studies and jointly explored the ethical, psychological, and spiritual dimensions of planetary upheaval.

Kelly has drawn extensively on Macy's concept of the Great Turning, relating it to broader historical and philosophical interpretations of transformation, including the idea of a Second Axial Age. Kelly coined the term "subtle activism." With David Nicol and Leslie Meehan, he co-founded the Gaiafield Center for Subtle Activism, an action-research initiative exploring contemplative and collective practices in social and ecological transformation.

=== Complexity theory, translation, and the concept of polycrisis ===
Kelly translated Edgar Morin's work on complexity for English-language audiences and contributed editorial work and scholarly interpretation of it. In 1999, he co-translated Morin and Anne-Brigitte Kern's Homeland Earth: A Manifesto for the New Millennium.

Kelly later contributed additional translations of Morin's work in edited volumes, including On Complexity and The Challenge of Complexity. Homeland Earth introduced Morin's conception of interacting global crises, later widely described as a polycrisis. The term gained renewed prominence in English-language discourse in the early 2020s, notably through historian Adam Tooze's Financial Times essay "Welcome to the World of the Polycrisis," which credited Morin's framework and referenced Kelly's translation, Homeland Earth, as a foundational source.

== Academic career ==
Kelly taught at several Canadian universities, including the University of Windsor, Carleton University, and the University of Ottawa, before relocating to the United States. In 1997, he joined the faculty of the California Institute of Integral Studies, where he has taught in the Philosophy, Cosmology, and Consciousness program.

At CIIS, Kelly has taught courses in Western philosophy, depth psychology, transpersonal theory, and integral ecology, and has supervised graduate research. He succeeded the founder, Richard Tarnas, as Chair of the PCC program.

Kelly has also held visiting professorships internationally, including appointments at Doshisha University and Ritsumeikan University in Kyoto, Japan, and at Schumacher College in the United Kingdom.

Kelly has served on the editorial boards of interdisciplinary journals, including the International Journal of Transpersonal Studies and Integration: Journal of Big Picture Theory and Practice, and has served on the advisory board of Archai: The Journal of Archetypal Cosmology. He has also been affiliated with the Esalen Center for Theory and Research, participating in several of its conference series.

== Major works and reception ==
=== Individuation and the Absolute ===
Individuation and the Absolute: Hegel, Jung, and the Path toward Wholeness examines the relationship between personal psychological development and broader historical movements and philosophical ideas. Kelly brings together the work of C. G. Jung and G. W. F. Hegel to argue that individuation — the formation of a coherent self — is intertwined with larger patterns of cultural and historical change. Central to the book is his concept of "complex holism," through which he analyzes dialectical relations between ego and unconscious, self and other, and the individual and the absolute. The work examines how questions of meaning and wholeness operate simultaneously at personal, cultural, and philosophical levels.

The book has been reviewed in The San Francisco Jung Institute Library Journal, Journal of Analytical Psychology, and Studies in Religion/Sciences Religieuses. Jungian analyst Hester McFarland Solomon described it as Kelly's "remarkable and sustained study of Hegel, Jung, and the path toward wholeness."

=== Coming Home ===
Coming Home: The Birth and Transformation of the Planetary Era interprets contemporary ecological and geopolitical crises as symptoms of a long historical transition that Kelly, following Edgar Morin, calls the "Planetary Era." He traces the origins of this era to early modern developments in the European West — including the conquest of the Americas and the Copernican revolution — and argues that these shifts gradually transformed how humans imagine their place on Earth. Drawing on thinkers such as Hegel, Teilhard de Chardin, Karl Jaspers, Joseph Campbell, Ken Wilber, Richard Tarnas, and Edgar Morin, the book presents an account of the evolution of Western consciousness and its implications for a possible planetary culture. Kelly introduces metaphors such as a "Great Code" and a "tightening spiral" to describe long-term patterns in Western intellectual history, while exploring whether these patterns might support more sustainable and relational ways of inhabiting the planet.

The book was reviewed by David Lorimer in the Scientific and Medical Network Review. It has also been cited in independent scholarship on sustainability, regenerative design, and cosmology, including Annick Hedlund-de Witt's peer-reviewed article on worldviews and sustainable development, Daniel Christian Wahl's Designing Regenerative Cultures, Brian Swimme and Mary Evelyn Tucker's Journey of the Universe, and a chapter by Alfonso Montuori and Gabrielle Donnelly in the Handbook of Personal and Organizational Transformation.

=== Becoming Gaia ===
Becoming Gaia: On the Threshold of Planetary Initiation frames climate change, biodiversity loss, and civilizational instability as signs of a long-term planetary transition rather than merely technical or policy problems. Drawing on Big History, comparative religion, transpersonal psychology, and integral philosophy, Kelly develops the idea of Gaia as a "concrete universal" — a way of thinking about Earth as a self-organizing, living system in which human beings participate. The book relates the planetary polycrisis to themes of death and rebirth, suggesting parallels with initiation narratives and with the idea of a possible "Second Axial Age." Kelly contrasts the dominant concept of the Anthropocene with what he calls the "Gaianthropocene," emphasizing relational belonging to Earth over purely technological or human-centered frameworks.

The book has been cited in interdisciplinary scholarship on ecological transformation and planetary thought. It appears in the bibliography of The Handbook of Ecological Civilization and in A History of Big History. It is also discussed in a 2026 Springer afterword by Peters, Green, and Misiaszek proposing a systems-theoretical synthesis for ecological civilization, and in Alfonso Montuori's chapter on integrative transdisciplinarity. In Ecocivilization, Jeremy Lent writes, “In Becoming Gaia: On the Threshold of Planetary Initiation, the philosopher Sean Kelly suggests that our planetary crisis might have the potential to catalyze a new form of planetary awareness: a ‘Gaian consciousness’ characterized by an awakening to our deeper nature as sentient manifestations of the living Earth, or Gaia.”

== Public engagement ==
Kelly has participated in public lectures, interviews, podcasts, and workshops in North America, Europe, and Japan addressing planetary crisis, ecological ethics, and the evolution of consciousness, including an appearance discussing Becoming Gaia with the Yale Forum on Religion and Ecology and an interview on the New Books Network. He has been interviewed on Integral Stage and on the Deep Adaptation podcast hosted by Jem Bendell. Kelly has also appeared in the documentary films Planetary (2015), The Way of the Psychonaut (2020), a documentary on the life and work of Stanislav Grof, and Conscious: Fulfilling Our Higher Evolutionary Potential (2017).

== Selected works ==
=== Books ===
- Individuation and the Absolute: Hegel, Jung, and the Path toward Wholeness (1993)
- Coming Home: The Birth and Transformation of the Planetary Era (2010)
- Living in End Times: Beyond Hope and Despair (2019)
- Becoming Gaia: On the Threshold of Planetary Initiation (2021)

=== Edited volumes ===
- Ken Wilber in Dialogue: Conversations with Leading Transpersonal Thinkers (with Donald Rothberg, 1998)
- Integral Ecologies: Nature, Culture, and Knowledge in the Planetary Era (with Sam Mickey and Adam Robbert, 2017)
- Psyche Unbound: Essays in Honor of Stanislav Grof (with Richard Tarnas, 2022)

=== Translations ===
- Edgar Morin and Anne-Brigitte Kern, Homeland Earth: A Manifesto for the New Millennium (co-translator, 1999)

=== Selected Articles ===
- 2002. “Space, Time, and Spirit: The Analogical Imagination and the Evolution of Transpersonal Theory.” The Journal of Transpersonal Psychology. Vol. 34, No. 2, pp. 73-100.
- 2005. “Transpersonal Psychology and the Paradigm of Complexity.” Emergence: Journal of Conscious Evolution. Vol. 1., No. 1.
- 2008. “Integral Time and the Varieties of Post-Mortem Survival.” Integral Review. Volume 4, No. 1, pp. 5-30.
- 2022. “Imagining Gaia.” Imaginezine.com.
- 2022. “A Personal Note on the Publication of Psyche Unbound: Essays in Honor of Stanislav Grof.” Alef Field.
- 2023. “Cosmogenesis and the Evolution of Consciousness.” The New Ecozoic Reader, No. 8, pp. 65-70.
- 2025. “I Want to Believe.” World Futures: The Journal of New Paradigm Research.
- 2026. “Conspiring with Joanna Macy: On the Passing and Abiding Presence of a Shambhala Warrior.” Emerge.

== See also ==
- Integral ecology
- Philosophy of complexity
- Polycrisis
- Transpersonal psychology
- Gaia theory
