= André Cailleux =

French scientist (1907–1986)

- Born: 24 December 1907; Paris, France
- Died: 27 December 1986 (aged 79); Saint-Maur-des-Fossés, France
- Awards: Albrecht-Penck-Medaille (1972)
- Scientific career
- Fields: Climatic geomorphology Geology; Paleontology; Planetary geology

André de Cayeux de Senarpont (known as André Cailleux, 24 December 1907 – 27 December 1986) was a French paleontologist and geologist known for being a pioneer in planetary geology.

== Career ==
He was born in Paris, France. After earning his Ph.D. in 1942, he became a specialist in glacial and periglacial morphology. His studies of terrestrial geology spanned the globe: he participated in missions to America, Greenland, Poland, Guyana, Mauritania, the Sahara and the Antarctic. In 1960, he represented the French government on an American polar expedition to Antarctica.

Early in his career, his interest in the application of mathematics to his fields of study, especially that of planetology, led him to the observatory of Paris-Meudon. He suggested and started applying geological science to planetary bodies other than the Earth as early as 1948, studying and publishing on the geomorphology and physics of the Moon, Mars, and other planets.

He conducted scientific conferences in 20 foreign countries, taught at the Sorbonne, Université Laval in Quebec, and the California Institute of Technology, and published 390 scientific works, on geomorphology, oceanography, hydrology, glaciology, petrography, mineralogy, geography, paleontology, planetary geology, and history.

Cailleux was a Christian and proponent of theistic evolution.

== Personal life ==
Cailleux was the grandfather of entrepreneur Laetitia Garriott de Cayeux.

== Bibliography ==
- Détermination pratique des roches, (with A. Chavan) Centre Documentation Universitaire, 1952, 2 volumes.
- Les Roches, Paris: Presses Universitaires de France, 1952.
- La Glace et les glaciers, (with V. Romanovsky) Paris: Presses Universitaires de France. 1953.
- Cryopédologie, Paris: Hermann, 1954
- Détermination pratique des minéraux, (with A. Chavan) Paris: Sedes, 1957.
- Détermination pratique des fossiles, (with A. Chavan) Paris: Masson, 1957.
- La Géologie, Paris: Presses Universitaires de France, 1956.
- Biogéographie mondiale, Paris: Presses Universitaires de France, 1953.
- Histoire de la Géologie, Paris: Presses Universitaires de France, 1968
- L'Anatomie de la Terre, Paris: Hachette, 1968.
- L'Antarctique, Paris: Presses Universitaires de France, 1967.

He was also the author of many papers.

=== English translations ===
- Anatomy of the Earth, New York, McGraw-Hill Book Company, 1968. Translated by J. Moody Stuart. ISBN 0-07-016223-9.
- Three Billion Years of Life, Stein and Day, New York, 1968. Translated by Joyce E Clemow. ISBN 0-8128-1349-9.
- Introduction to climatic geomorphology, Longman, 1972. Translated by Conrad J.Kriewiet de Jonge.

== Awards and honors ==
- The crater Cailleux on the Moon was named after him by the International Astronomical Union.
- André Cailleux received many honors and awards, including the Croix de Guerre (1940), the Chevalier of the Legion of Honor (1952), and the French medal of recognition (1953).
- The André Cailleux medal is awarded by the Association Québécoise pour l'étude du Quaternaire.
