= Sean Bailey (disambiguation) =

Sean Bailey is an American film producer.

Sean Bailey may also refer to:

- Sean Bailey (sprinter) (born 1997), Jamaican sprinter
- Sean Bailey (climber) (born 1996), American rock climber

== See also ==
- Shaun Bailey (disambiguation)
