= Sean Gleeson =

Sean Gleeson is the name of:

- Seán Gleeson, actor, director and producer
- Sean Gleeson (rugby league) rugby league player
- Sean Gleeson (Home and Away), a fictional character from the Australian soap opera Home and Away
- Sean Gleeson (American football), American football coach
