= Sean Marshall =

Sean Marshall may refer to:

- Sean Marshall (actor) (born 1965), American former actor and singer
- Sean Marshall (baseball) (born 1982), American baseball player.
- Sean Marshall (basketball) (born 1985), American basketball player

== See also ==
- Shaun Marshall (born 1978), English footballer
