= Sean Walker =

Sean Walker may refer to:

- Sean Walker (ice hockey) (born 1994), Canadian ice hockey player
- Sean Walker (racing driver) (born 1958), British auto racing driver
- Sean Walker, a fictional character portrayed by Jason Ritter in NBC's The Event
