= Sean Kearns =

Sean Kearns (born 24 December 1968 in North Vancouver, British Columbia) is a filmmaker, producer and entrepreneur who gained public attention during the late '80s and early '90s as a professional snowboarder and a sponsored skateboarder. Kearns was a key player in the Whiskey snowboard films (Whiskey 1, Whiskey 2 Whiskey 3, Whiskey 4 and 20/20) during the 1990s. The Whiskey movies are revered as cult classics. in the snowboard culture.

Noted in the book Snowboarding: The Ultimate Guide as being among the creators of the hardcore image associated with the professional snowboarding lifestyle, Kearns leveraged his experience within the snowboarding culture and continued to work in the industry as a filmmaker, director and producer, working on several snowboarding and skateboarding films that were sponsored by brands, including Burton, Volcom, and Oakley.

== Professional athlete ==
Sponsors

As a professional skateboarder for Quiksilver (1984–1990) and as a professional snowboarder riding for Santa Cruz (1990–1999) Kearns was cited in Thrasher Magazine, and had a snowboard named after him called the Santa Cruz Sean Kearns Respect Snowboard.

== Business career ==
In 2004, Kearns founded Infamous Management Inc, a management agency representing professionals in the skateboarding, snowboarding, and surfing industry, including J.P. Walker. In 2005 Kearns launched Infamous Entertainment Inc., a production company that specializes in action sport filmmaking. In 2006, Infamous Entertainment Inc secured a studio accreditation from iTunes for the Forum movie "That".

== Filmography ==
- 1994 Whiskey 1 Co-directed and produced with Canadian, Sean Johnson
- 1995 Whiskey 2 Co-directed and produced with Canadian, Sean Johnsonn
- 1996 20/20 Co-directed and produced with Canadian, Sean Johnson
- 1998 Whiskey 4 Co-directed and produced with Canadian, Sean Johnson
- 1999 Technical Difficulties Cinematographer, Mack Dawg Productions
- 2000 The Resistance Director, Mack Dawg Productions
- 2001 True Life Director, Mack Dawg Productions
- 2001 "Out Cold" Stunt performer, Touchstone Pictures and Spyglass Entertainment
- 2002 Nixon Jib Fest Director, Mack Dawg productions
- 2003 Shakedown Director, Mack Dawg Productions
- 2003 Breakdown on Shakedown Director, Mack Dawg Productions
- 2004 Chulksmack Cinematographer, Mack Dawg Productions
- 2006 That Co-producer, Forum Snowboards
