= Sean McAdam =

Sean McAdam may refer to:

- Sean McAdam (journalist), United States sports writer
- Sean McAdam (politician), Canadian politician
