= Sean Maloney =

Sean or Shaun Maloney may refer to:

- Seán Maloney (Irish politician) (born 1945), Irish politician
- Sean Patrick Maloney (born 1966), American Democratic Party politician in New York state
- Sean Maloney (baseball) (born 1971), former American Major League Baseball pitcher
- Sean Maloney (technology), Intel executive
- Shaun Maloney (born 1983), Scottish footballer
- Shaun Maloney (labor activist) (1911–1999), American labor activist
