= Sean McGrath =

Sean McGrath may refer to:

- Sean McGrath (musician), American musician and artist who lives in San Francisco, California
- Sean McGrath (American football) (born 1987), American football tight end
- Sean McGrath (philosopher) (born 1966), Canadian philosopher
