= Sean MacManus =

Sean or Seán MacManus may refer to:

- Seán MacManus (politician) (born 1950), Irish Sinn Féin politician in Sligo
- Sean McManus (television executive) (born 1955), American television network executive
- Seán McManus (priest), County Fermanagh-born, US-based nationalist activist priest

== See also ==
- Shaun McManus (born 1976), Australian rules footballer
- Shawn McManus (born 1958), American comic book artist
