= Sean Douglas =

Sean Douglas may refer to:

- Sean Douglas (footballer), a retired New Zealand international association football player
- Sean Douglas (politician), Dominican politician
- Sean Douglas (songwriter), American songwriter, producer, musician
- Sean Douglas, actor in Mr. Deity
- Sean Douglas, general authority of The Church of Jesus Christ of Latter-day Saints

== See also ==
- Sean Douglass (born 1979), American baseball player, right-handed pitcher
