= Sean Jones =

Sean Jones may refer to:

- Sean Jones (defensive end) (born 1962), American football player
- Sean Jones (safety) (born 1982), American football player
- Sean Jones (trumpeter) (born 1978), with the Lincoln Center Jazz Orchestra
- Sean Jones (singer/songwriter), Canadian
- Sean Jones, lead guitarist for The Litter

== See also ==
- Shawn Jones (disambiguation)
