= Sean Walsh =

Sean Walsh may refer to:

- Seán Walsh (politician) (1925–1989), Irish Fianna Fáil politician
- Seán Walsh (footballer) (born 1957), Irish Gaelic footballer
- Sean Walsh (born 1991), member of The Original Rudeboys
- Sean Walsh (born 1994), golfer and member of Good Good

== See also ==
- Seann Walsh (born 1985), English comedian and actor
- Séanna Walsh (born 1957), Irish politician and former IRA militant
