= Sean Morey =

Sean Morey may refer to:

- Sean Morey (American football) (born 1976), former American football wide receiver
- Sean Morey (comedian), American comedian
