= Sean Ryan =

Sean or Seán Ryan may refer to:

== Politics ==
- Seán Ryan (Irish politician) (born 1943), Irish Labour Party politician
- Sean Ryan (American politician), New York state legislator

== Sports ==
- Sean Ryan (tight end) (born 1980), tight end in the National Football League
- Sean Ryan (American football coach) (born 1972), American football coach and former player
- Sean Ryan (cyclist) (born 1941), British cyclist
- Seán Ryan (dual player) (born 1986), Irish hurler and former Gaelic footballer
- Sean Ryan (Tipperary hurler) (fl. 2023)
- Seán Ryan (Offaly Gaelic footballer) (1939–2012), Irish Gaelic footballer
- Sean Ryan (rugby league) (born 1973), Australian former professional rugby league footballer
- Seán Ryan (sports administrator) (1895–1963), president of the Gaelic Athletic Association
- Sean Ryan (swimmer) (born 1992), American swimmer
- Sean Ryan (wide receiver) (born 1999), wide receiver in the National Football League

== Other people ==
- Sean Ryan (cinematographer), Australian filmmaker, cinematographer for The Moogai (2024)
- Seán Ryan (fiddler) (1919–1985), Irish folk music fiddler
- Sean Ryan (judge), Irish judge

== See also ==
- Shaun Ryan, Australian rules football umpire
- Shawn Ryan (born 1966), American writer
- Shawn Ryan (United States Navy), American podcaster and Navy SEAL
- Sean Rhyan (born 2000), American football offensive guard
