= Sean Whyte =

Sean Whyte may refer to:

- Sean Whyte (ice hockey) (born 1970), Canadian hockey player
- Sean Whyte (Canadian football) (born 1985), Canadian football kicker

== See also ==
- Sean White (disambiguation)
- Shaun White (born 1986), American professional snowboarder and skateboarder
- Sean Wight (1964–2011), Australian rules footballer from Scotland
