= Sean McCarthy =

Sean McCarthy may refer to:

- Sean McCarthy (songwriter) (1923–1990), Irish songwriter
- Seán McCarthy (Cork politician) (1889–1974), Irish Fianna Fáil politician
- Seán McCarthy (Tipperary politician) (1937–2021), Irish Fianna Fáil politician
- Seán McCarthy (hurler) (born 1966), Irish hurler
- Sean McCarthy (Welsh footballer) (born 1967), Welsh footballer and football manager
- Sean McCarthy (Irish footballer) (1922–2006)
- Seán McCarthy (rugby union, born 1990), Irish rugby union player for Bedford Blues
- Seán McCarthy (rugby union, born 1993), Irish rugby union player for Munster
- Shawn McCarthy (born 1968), American football player
