= Sean O'Neill =

Sean O'Neillmay refer to:

- Seán O'Neill (born 1938), Gaelic football player for Down
- Sean O'Neill (table tennis) (born 1967), American table tennis player and coach
- Seán O'Neill (hurler) (born 1972), Irish hurler for Limerick
- Sean O'Neill (rower) (born 1980), Irish / New Zealand rower
- Sean O'Neill (actor) (born 1985), Canadian, actor and arts professional
- Sean O'Neill (footballer) (born 1988), association footballer
- Sean O'Neill (Louth Gaelic footballer) (born c. 1980), Gaelic football player for Louth
- Sean O'Neill, Irish musician, better known as John O'Neill (guitarist)
- Sean O'Neill (diplomat), American diplomat

== See also ==
- Sean O'Neal (born 1977), actor
