= Sean Higgins =

Sean Higgins may refer to:

- Sean Higgins (footballer) (born 1984), Scottish footballer
- Sean Higgins (basketball) (born 1968), American basketball player
- Sean M. Higgins, alleged drunk driver who struck and killed Johnny Gaudreau in 2024

== See also ==
- Shaun Higgins (born 1988), Australian footballer
- Shaun Higgins (soccer) (born 1978), American soccer player
