= Sean Murray =

Sean Murray may refer to:

- Sean Murray (field hockey) (born 1997), Lisnagarvey player and senior Ireland international
- Sean Murray (footballer, born 1993), Dundalk FC player and Irish youth international
- Sean Murray (Gaelic footballer), Dublin player
- Sean Murray (actor) (born 1977), American actor
- Sean Murray (politician) (1898–1961), Irish communist politician
- Sean Murray (Irish republican), Irish republican from Belfast, Northern Ireland
- Sean Murray (composer) (born 1965), notable for his work in the Call of Duty series
- Sean Murray, co-founder and director of Hello Games
- Shaun Murray (born 1976), American wakeboarder
- Shaun Murray (footballer) (born 1970), former professional footballer
