= Sean French =

Sean French may refer to:

- Sean French, one half of the writing duo known as Nicci French
- Seán French (1889–1937), Irish Fianna Fáil politician, Teachta Dála (TD) 1927–1932
- Seán French (1931–2011), Irish Fianna Fáil politician, Teachta Dála (TD) 1967–1982
- Seán French (rugby union) (born 1999), Irish rugby union player
