= Sean O'Sullivan =

Sean O'Sullivan

- Seán Ó Súilleabháin (1903–1996), folklorist involved in the Irish Folklore Commission
- Sean O'Sullivan (baseball) (born 1987), Major League Baseball pitcher
- Sean O'Sullivan (engineer), entrepreneur and engineer
- Seán O'Sullivan (footballer) (fl. 2000s), Irish Gaelic footballer who plays for Kerry and Cromane
- Seán O'Sullivan (painter) (1906–1964), Irish painter
- Sean O'Sullivan (priest) (1952–1989), Canadian politician and priest
- Sean O'Sullivan (rugby league) (born 1998), Australian rugby league player
- Sean O'Sullivan (snooker player) (born 1994), English snooker player
- Shawn O'Sullivan (born 1962), retired Canadian boxer

== See also ==
- Sean Sullivan (disambiguation)
