= Sean Thomas =

Sean Thomas may refer to:

- Sean Thomas (American football) (born 1962), American football player
- Sean Thomas (writer), (born 1963), English journalist, who also uses multiple pseudonyms
- Seán Thomas, (died 1999) former manager of the Republic of Ireland national football team
- Sean Thomas, guitarist for the Australian band Kisschasy
- Sean Thomas, a member of The Heatmakerz

== See also ==
- Sean Patrick Thomas, (born 1970) American actor
