= Sean Martin =

Sean Martin may refer to:

- Sean Martin (cartoonist) (born 1960), Canadian cartoonist
- Sean Martin (musician), Irish member of The Starjets

== See also ==
- F. Sean Martin
- Shawn Martin, footballer
