= Shaun Rogers =

Shaun Rogers may refer to:

- Shaun Rogers (American football) (born 1979), American football defensive tackle
- Shaun Rogers (figure skater) (born 1985), American figure skater
