= Roelof Botha =

South African-American venture capitalist (born 1973)

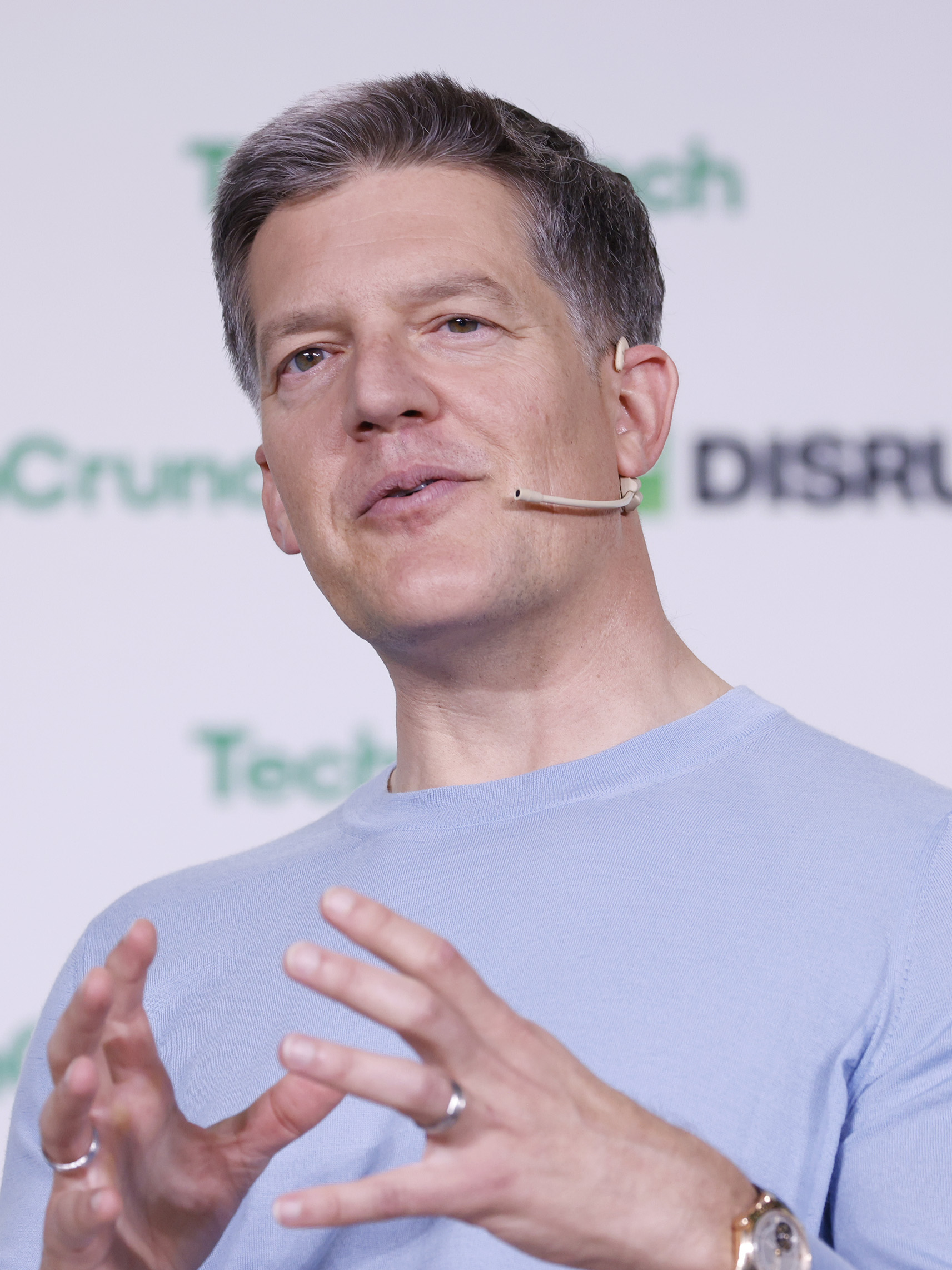
- Botha in 2025
- Born: Roelof Frederik Botha; 19 September 1973 (age 53); Pretoria, South Africa
- Education: University of Cape Town (BSc); Stanford University (MBA)
- Occupation: Venture capitalist
- Known for: CFO of PayPal; Partner at Sequoia Capital
- Board member of: Square, Unity, SpaceX
- Relatives: Pik Botha (grandfather); Piet Botha (uncle)

Roelof Frederik Botha (born 19 September 1973) is a South African-American venture capitalist. He was at Sequoia Capital from 2003 to 2026, running its U.S. business from 2017 and leading the whole firm from 2022 to 2025. Before Sequoia he worked at PayPal from 2000 to 2003, and was its chief financial officer (CFO) when it went public in 2002.

Botha joined the boards of Natera in 2007, Unity in 2009, Square in 2011 and MongoDB in 2013, and was earlier a director of Xoom (2005–2015), Eventbrite (2009–2022) and Bird (2018–2022). He was also on the board of Evernote, and in June 2026 joined the board of SpaceX as an independent director. He also invested in Instagram and the bioinformatics company AssureRx. He was previously on the boards of YouTube and Meebo before both were acquired by Google, Weebly before it was acquired by Square, and Tumblr before it was acquired by Yahoo!. He also sat on the boards of Jawbone, Mahalo and Whisper, Nimbula and TokBox, and on that of 23andMe from 2017 until he and the company's other independent directors resigned in 2024.

He has appeared on Forbes' annual ranking of venture capitalists, the Midas List, ranking 23rd in 2007, 22nd in 2008, 26th in 2009, 3rd in 2020, 9th in 2021, 36th in 2022 and 13th in 2025.

== Early life and education ==
Botha was born in Pretoria, South Africa, in 1973. His parents separated when he was three and he grew up with his mother; at the age of six he moved to Cape Town. His grandfather was Pik Botha, who was the country's foreign minister in the last years of the apartheid era. He was raised in Hout Bay, a suburb of Cape Town, and attended Hoërskool Jan van Riebeeck. He studied actuarial science, economics and statistics at the University of Cape Town, graduating in 1996 with the highest grade point average in the history of the university's commerce faculty, and at 22 became the youngest person in South Africa to qualify as an actuary. He worked at McKinsey & Company in Johannesburg from 1996 to 1998, then moved to the United States to study for an MBA at the Stanford Graduate School of Business, where he graduated at the top of his class. In 2012, Stellenbosch University awarded him an honorary doctorate.

== Career ==
In 2000, prior to his graduation from Stanford, Botha became director of corporate development for PayPal. He moved on to vice-president of finance and was named chief financial officer (CFO) in September 2001. PayPal went public in February 2002, and was purchased by eBay in October 2002. Meg Whitman offered Botha the opportunity to stay on as CFO post-acquisition, but venture capitalist Michael Moritz, who had invested in PayPal and was a board member, offered him a partnership, which he accepted in January 2003.

At Sequoia Capital, Botha oversaw the firm's investments in YouTube, Instagram, and Block (formerly Square), among others. He was on the board of Xoom from 2005 until it was acquired by PayPal in 2015. In 2017, Botha assumed responsibility for Sequoia's U.S. operations from Jim Goetz. In April 2022, Sequoia announced that, starting in July 2022, Botha would replace Doug Leone as Senior Steward of Sequoia's global brand and operations.

Botha has led or co-led Sequoia's investments in several early and growth stage companies. As of 2022, his active investments include Ethos Technologies, Evernote, GenEdit, Landis, mmhmm, Pendulum, Skiff, Temporal Technologies, and The Org. On October 9, 2023, Botha, who had been Unity's lead independent director, became chairman of the board of directors at Unity Technologies.

In November 2025, Botha stepped down as Sequoia's senior steward and was succeeded by Alfred Lin and Pat Grady; he said he would move into a role "advising the partnership" and keep representing the firm on company boards. The Wall Street Journal reported that he had been asked to step aside after some partners raised concerns about his leadership style. According to people close to the firm cited by Forbes, Sequoia returned more than $50 billion to its investors after Botha took on a top role in 2017. In July 2026, after more than two decades at Sequoia, he left the firm to focus on his board seats and his own investments. The month before, he had joined the board of SpaceX, whose chief executive Elon Musk had recruited him to PayPal.

== Personal life ==
Botha's father, also named Roelof, is an economist. His uncle was the rock musician Piet Botha. His grandfather was Roelof Frederik "Pik" Botha, a South African politician who was the country's foreign minister from 1977 to 1994, under the Apartheid government, and later served in Nelson Mandela's government. Botha married Huifen Chan, whom he met when they were both students at Stanford; by 2007 they had two children.
