= Sean Porter =

Sean Porter may refer to:

- Sean Porter (American football) (born 1991), American football player
- Sean Porter (cinematographer) (fl. 2010s), American cinematographer
- Sean Porter, American football player and coach in the film Gridiron Gang

== See also ==
- Shawn Porter (born 1987), American professional boxer
- Seán Powter (born 1997), Irish Gaelic footballer
