= Sean Richardson =

Sean Richardson may refer to:

- Sean Richardson (rugby league) (born 1973), rugby league footballer
- Sean Richardson (American football) (born 1990), American football safety
