= Sean Wilson =

Sean Wilson may refer to:

- Sean Wilson (actor) (born 1965), English television actor
- Sean Wilson (speedway rider) (born 1969), English former international speedway rider
- Sean Wilson (politician), Canadian politician
- Sean Michael Wilson, Scottish comic book writer
- Shaun Wilson (born 1972), Australian artist and filmmaker
- Shaun Wilson (American football) (born 1995), American football player
- Shawn Wilson, American politician
