= Sean Conway =

Sean Conway may refer to:

- Sean Conway (swimmer) (born 1981), British-Zimbabwean athlete, author and speaker
- Sean Conway (businessman) (born 1984), American entrepreneur
- Sean Conway (Canadian politician) (born 1951), Ontario legislator and professor
- Sean Conway (Irish politician) (1931–1995), senator
- Sean Conway (born 1983) Rugby league player
