= Sean Baker (disambiguation) =

Sean Baker (born 1971) is an American film director, cinematographer, producer, screenwriter, and editor.

Sean Baker may also refer to:

- Sean Baker (soldier), American soldier injured at Guantanamo Bay
- Sean Baker (American football) (born 1988), American football player

== See also ==
- Shaun Baker (disambiguation)
