= Cailleux (crater) =

Crater on the Moon

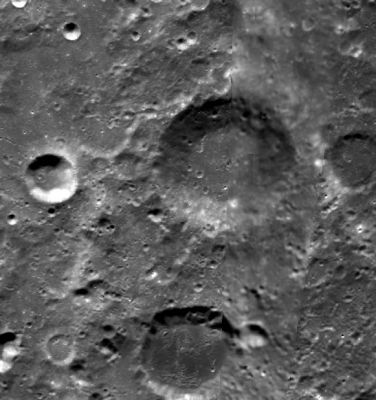
- Clementine space probe image of Cailleux (upper right of center) from PDS Map-A-Planet
- Coordinates: 60.41°S 153.50°E
- Diameter: 81.30 km (50.52 mi)
- Depth: Unknown
- Colongitude: 208° at sunrise
- Eponym: André Cailleux

Cailleux is a lunar impact crater that is attached to the southwest rim of the walled plain called Poincaré. The Cailleux crater lies within the South Pole-Aitken basin in the southern part of the Moon's far side, and cannot be seen from the Earth. To the southeast of Cailleux is the crater Lyman, and nearly due westward is Prandtl.

This crater is circular and symmetrical, with a worn rim and inner wall that is marked by a number of tiny craterlets. Most of the inner wall slopes gently down to the interior floor, and lacks terraces or other detail. At the bottom the floor is level and relatively featureless, with only a few tiny craters to mark the surface.

Formerly identified as satellite crater Poincaré R, this formation is named after French physicist André de Cayeux de Senarpont (1885-1959), who used the pseudonym of André Cailleux for all his published materials. Its designation was formally adopted by the International Astronomical Union in 1970.
