= Sean Scott =

Sean Scott may refer to:

- Sean Scott (American football), American football player
- Sean Scott (volleyball), American beach volleyball player
- Sean F. Scott, American disease activist and former ALS Therapy Development Institute president

== See also ==
- Seann William Scott, American actor
