= Clandeboye =

Former Gaelic Kingdom on the island of Ireland

Coordinates: 54.642°N 5.717°W

Clandeboye Clann Aodha Buidhe (Irish)
- 1295–1605
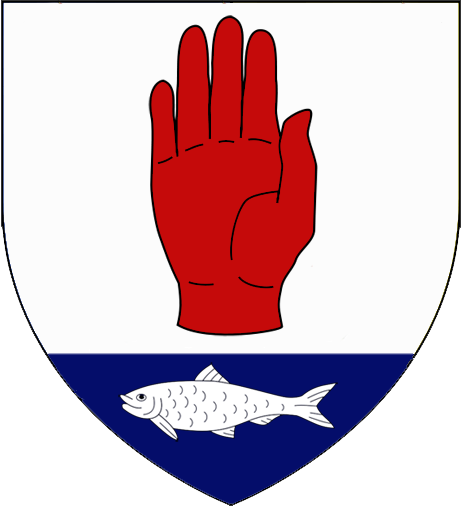
- Coat of arms

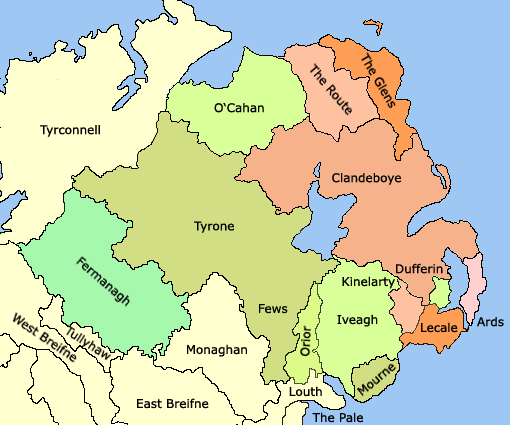
- O'Neill of Clandeboye c. 1500
- Common languages: Irish
- Government: Elective monarchy
- King / Chief
  - 1295-1347: Henry O'Neill (first)
  - 1618: Conn O'Neill (last)
- History
  - Established: 1295
  - Disestablished: 1605
Preceded by	Succeeded by
Earldom of Ulster; Kingdom of Tyrone	Kingdom of Ireland
- Today part of: United Kingdom

Clandeboye or Clannaboy (Irish Clann Aodha Buí, "family of Hugh the Blond") was a kingdom of Gaelic Ireland, comprising what is now south County Antrim, north County Down, and the barony of Loughinsholin. The entity was relatively late in appearance and is associated partly with the Gaelic resurgence of the High Middle Ages. The O'Neill Clandeboy (Ó Néill Clann Aodha Buidhe) who reigned in the territory descended from Hugh Boy O'Neill, a king of Tyrone. His descendants took advantage of the demise of the Earldom of Ulster during the latter 14th century and seized vast portions of territory. Clandeboye's main seats of power were Shane's Castle and Castle Reagh.

The kingdom came to an end at the dawn of the 17th century after Conn O'Neill, the last head of the Clandeboye O'Neills of Upper Clandeboye, was strong-armed into signing away two-thirds of his land to Scottish and English colonial administrators such as Hugh Montgomery and James Hamilton who proceeded to privately settle their land with settlers from Great Britain just prior to the larger Plantation of Ulster. Conn died in poverty 1618. James Hamilton became the first Viscount Claneboye in 1622.

== Etymology ==
The spelling of the name has varied over the years, and had been written variously as Clandeboye, Claneboye, Clandyboy, Clannaboy, and Clanaboy. Clandeboye has also been adopted as the name of an electoral ward of North Down Borough Council. It has survived as a geographical location in modern times as an area of Bangor, County Down, Northern Ireland.

== History ==
=== 14th century: emergence and position ===
Arms of de Burgh, Earls of Ulster. The O'Neills benefited from the decline of the Earldom of Ulster during the Gaelic resurgence of the 14th century.

The emergence of the Kingdom of Clandeboye is closely associated with the history of its neighbour the Kingdom of Tyrone and the Gaelic resurgence of the 14th century. The O'Neill dynasty that ruled Tyrone had established themselves as a serious power in Ireland by the 13th century, providing Brian Chatha an Dúna O'Neill who was a late claimant to the High Kingship of Ireland before falling at the Battle of Down in 1260.

The O'Neills were, locally, engaged in rivalries with the Norman Earldom of Ulster among other regional foes. In the 12th century, following the Norman invasion of Ireland, the Normans had taken from the native Gaelic Kingdom of Ulster some lands and established their Earldom in the north-eastern corner of Ireland. (Note: The indigenous Kings of Ulster before the coming of the Normans were from the MacDonlevy clan, their descendants included the McNulty ("son of the Ulsterman") and allegedly Clan MacLea (Livingstone) in Argyll. The Ulaid kindred claimed descent from Ír, a son of Míl Espáine and brother of Érimón (from whom the O'Neills descend). Even after the Norman invasion, some of the native Ulaidh retained power in parts of old Ulster, in the form of the Magennis clan in Iveagh.) Subsequently, they were engaged in conflicts and mutual raidings with their direct neighbors the Northern Uí Néill.

By the 14th century, the Earldom of Ulster was under the Ulster branch of the de Burgh dynasty (other branches of this kinship group held territories elsewhere in Ireland, but became heavily Gaelicised). The Bruce campaign in Ireland, with the defenders of the Anglo-aligned Lordship of Ireland being led by Richard Óg de Burgh, 2nd Earl of Ulster, suffered significantly during the conflict. Eventually the Norman title to the Earldom of Ulster passed to the Mortimer family. Niall Mór O'Neill, King of Tyrone (1364–1397) created a vacuum in the area by driving out some of the Anglo-Norman settlers. The Kingship of Tyrone had in recent times been contested by two sets of cousins, one of which was the Clandeboye O'Neills (descended from Hugh Boy O'Neill), who had provided three Kings of Tyrone in the 13th century, before losing out to the line descended from Aodh Reamhair O'Neill (son of Domhnall O'Neill), whom all subsequent Tyrone kings would descend from.

By 1347, Muirchertach Ceannfada O'Neill was the first King of Clandeboye not to be also King of Tyrone, controlling the parts of the old Earldom of Ulster taken over by the O'Neills. Most of their territory was east of the River Bann, in what would today be called south County Antrim and north County Down. The part of Clandeboye territory which was west of the River Bann was Loughinsholin, in what is today County Londonderry, including part of the Sperrin Mountains. This O'Neill line, which had lost out on the Kingship of Tyrone, although technically at first uirrithe (under-kings) of their Tyrone cousins, soon established their own autonomy. Geopolitically, they looked to offset the power of their Tyrone neighbors, by forming alliances with other powers in the area; the MacDonnells of Antrim (a clan of fairly recent Highland Scots descent descended from John of Islay, Lord of the Isles), the powerful O'Donnells of Tyrconnell and, when it suited, the Kingdom of England's Lordship of Ireland based in Dublin. Clandeboye's lands were suited to cattle grazing and so their rulers were able to attain a significant level of wealth through this.

=== 15th century: shifting alliances ===
Towards the end of the 14th century and into the early 15th century, the Clandeboye shifted away from their rapprochement with their O'Neill of Tyrone cousins and as with the case of their neighbours to the south, the Magennis clan of Iveagh, entered into an alliance with the powerful O'Donnells of Tyrconnell under Turlough an Fhíona O'Donnell (1380—1422). An ascendant maritime kingdom based in the north-west of Ireland, able to put into the field a strong army with a Gallowglass basis, Tyrconnell mounted a serious challenge to Tyrone's domination of the north of Ireland: Clandeboye and Iveagh saw this as an opportunity to assert more independence for themselves. As part of this complex patchwork of alliances, which spread throughout all of Ireland, there was a wider implication for geopolitics in the British Isles and indeed European politics, in the context of the Hundred Years' War; one faction made alliances with the Plantagenet Kingdom of England, the other with the Stewart Kingdom of Scotland (and thus, by implication of their Auld Alliance; the Kingdom of France). Thus, when Richard II of England visited Ireland and gained the "submission" of a number of Gaelic Irish and Gaelicised chiefs in 1395, there were a few notable absences: the O'Donnells of Tyrconnell (friends of Stewart Scotland) and their Irish allies such as the O'Neills of Clandeboye, Burke of Mayo and O'Connor Ruadh of Roscommon, who never submitted.

Despite being a relatively junior kingdom, Clandeboye was able to hand military defeats to ostensibly stronger powers which tried to invade them during the reigns of the brothers Murtagh Roe O'Neill and Hugh Boy II O'Neill, closely guarding their autonomy. For example, Eoghan O'Neill, King of Tyrone, invaded Clandeboye in 1444 but was defeated. His son Éinri (Henry) O'Neill, the King of Tyrone, tried the same again while invading Clandeboye in 1476, but he too was defeated. Meanwhile, during the reign of Conn O'Neill, when the Anglo-controlled Lordship tried to revive its colony in Ulster, appointing Patrick Savage of Lecale as the Seneschal of Ulster, he was captured in 1481 by the Clandeboye forces and was subsequently "blinded and castrated in captivity", making him unfit to carry on his duties.

=== 16th century: weakening and decline ===
The Kingdom of Clandeboye had been divided in the early 16th century into "Lower Clandeboye" and "Upper Clandeboye", following a decline in power of the last undivided King of Clandeboye, Murtagh Dulenagh O'Neill. His nephews from two of his older brothers, who had also been Kings of Clandeboye (Phelim Bacagh O'Neill and Niall Oge O'Neill), took advantage of their uncle's weakness and established themselves. This situation was recognised as such and reported by Thomas Cusack, the Lord Chancellor of Ireland in his letter to the Duke of Northumberland on the current state of Ireland in March 1552. Neighbouring the Clandeboye to the north-east were a group of Highland Scots in the Glens of Antrim. They were Gallowglass soldiers under the leadership of the MacDonnell of Antrim who had established themselves by the mid-16th century as Lords of the Glens (the remaining parts of the area which Normans had previously held as the Earldom of Ulster). During a conflict with them, the heir to Clandeboye, Niall O'Neill (son of Hugh O'Neill) was killed in 1537, weakening the natural succession. To the west of Clandeboye were their more powerful O'Neill kinsmen, the O'Neills of Tyrone (from whom the Clandeboye's had branched off in the 13th century).

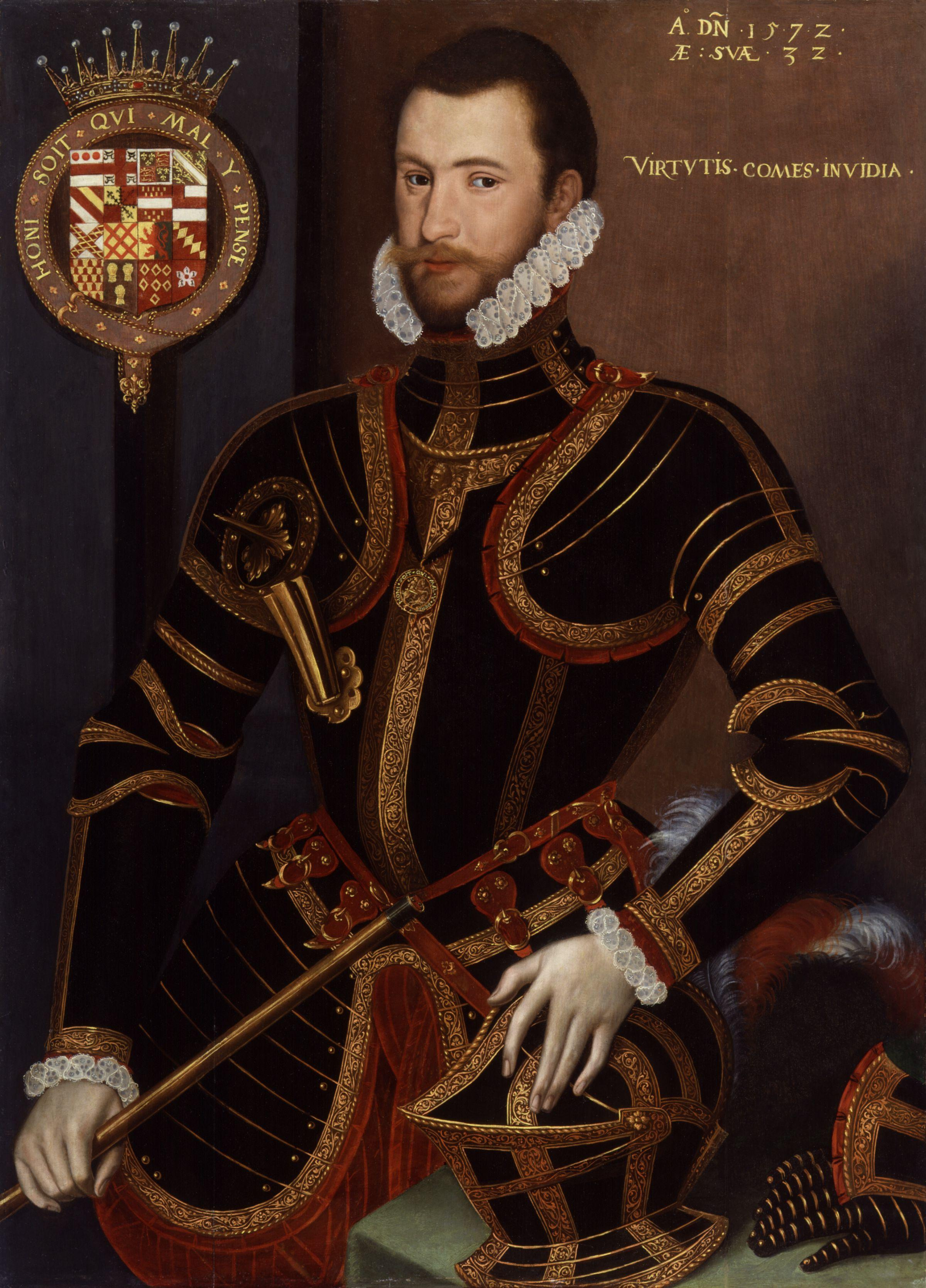
The destruction of Clandeboye was closely associated with the activities of the Earl of Essex in Ireland.

During the Tudor conquest of Ireland under Henry VIII, whereby the English were attempting to establish the Kingdom of Ireland, various Gaelic kings were offered a policy of surrender and regrant. They could keep their traditional territories as lords, so long as they legally and culturally Anglicised, joined the Anglican Church and pledged allegiance to Henry VIII: Conn Bacach O'Neill took him up on the offer, exchanging the Kingship of Tyrone for the Earldom of Tyrone in 1542. The heir to this title was the Baron Dungannon: Conn Bacach's son Shane O'Neill was overlooked and the title went instead to Shane's illegitimate alleged half-brother Matthew O'Neill. During the 1550s and 1560s, Shane (later known as "the Proud") arose to assert his rights, protesting to Elizabeth I and inflicted notable military defeats on establishment figures such as the Earl of Essex.

The O'Neills of Clandeboye diligently offered their services up to the Crown forces during the campaign of Shane O'Neill. Part of the backstory of this was that Brian Faghartach O'Neill (the oldest son of the aforementioned Niall Oge O'Neill) was assassinated by a then 20-year-old Shane O'Neill in 1548. Brian Faghartach was the first Lord of Upper Clandeboye, thought likely to be involved in a surrender and regrant, allowing him to establish himself as a Lord of a portion in the now split up Clandeboye. When Shane rose up, he was able to establish his influence over Clandeboye and force it into being one of his urriaght (subsidiary) territories. At Carrickfergus, an Anglo-Irish crown garrison had been established under William Piers with the support of Brian McPhelim O'Neill, the Lord of Lower Clandeboye, who was subsequently knighted for supporting them against Shane the Proud and also the Scots in the Glens of Antrim. Brian McPhelim and some of his relatives acted as intelligence agents to Piers, playing a role in undermining Shane at the Battle of Farsetmore in 1567.

Piers as the Seneschal of Clandeboye, was keen to encourage provincial Gaelic clans loyal to the Crown in Ulster as a balance against the influx of Scots, whose presence was unwelcome to the English: a policy which seemingly boded well for Clandeboye. Seeing himself as in a secure position, Brian McPhelim decided to flex his power and waged a private war against the Tyrone successor of Shane, Turlough Lynagh O'Neill. A year after the death of his father, Turlough had declared loyalty to Elizabeth I and so Brian McPhelim's adventurism did not impress the authorities. Elizabeth I made a grant of the entire territory of Clandeboye in 1571 as part of the so-called Enterprise of Ulster: Sir Thomas Smith, her principal Secretary of State was granted what would become north Down and the Ards, while the Earl of Essex was also to be a major beneficiary with a grant of all of County Antrim except for the Route and the Glens (the land had previously been claimed as part of the "Earldom of Ulster" during medieval times, this being the basis of the Crown's grant). The plan was to colonise the land with English Protestants in a foreshadowing of the Ulster Plantation. Sir Brian McPhelim upon finding this out in a booklet published by Smith felt betrayed by the Queen's "duplicity", having felt he was safe in his position due to his allegiance to the Crown and past service to it. Instead of allow his lands to be colonised, Sir Brian McPhelim elected upon a scorched earth policy, burning down any buildings in his territory which could be used as a prospective garrison or could be used for colonisation.

Smith had sent his illegitimate son, also named Thomas, along with the 800 English colonists who had set off from Liverpool to Ards: in October 1573, Thomas Smith Jnr was shot dead by an Irishman he had employed as a labourer. A couple of years later Smith Snr had abandoned the project completely. Essex, who had only recently been made an Earl, encouraged by Lord Burghley, was more directly involved on the ground and had most of his fortune at stake. Haunted by an outbreak of plague at Carrickfergus in 1573–74, which decimated Essex's forces, he fled to the English Pale, being based at Dublin and Drogheda for the rest of his time, only entering Ulster on raids against O'Neill and others. Evidently frustrated, Essex had Piers arrested and accused him of passing intelligence to Sir Brian McPhelim (Piers was later released). In November 1574, Sir Brian McPhelim had invited Essex to Belfast Castle to a feast where they would discuss concluding a peace. At the end of the three day feast, Essex's men, suddenly fell upon their Irish hosts and carried out the Clandeboye massacre, where 200 men, women and children were murdered without warning. Sir Brian McPhelim, his wife and his half-brother Rory Oge MacQuillin were all taken hostage to Dublin where they were hanged for opposing the plantations. The following year, Essex was responsible for an even more gratuitous massacre in Ulster, this time against the MacDonnells of Antrim in the Rathlin Island massacre (Essex accused the Clandeboye O'Neills and MacDonnels of being co-conspirators against the English colonists), before Elizabeth I called an end to "the Enterprise" in 1575. Before his own death in 1576, Essex was able to sow division among the ranks of the Clandeboye by declaring Niall McBrian Fertagh O'Neill (grandson of Niall Oge O'Neill and son-in-law of Sir Brian MacPhelim) as rightful lord of all Clandeboye.

=== 17th century: divisions and dissolution ===
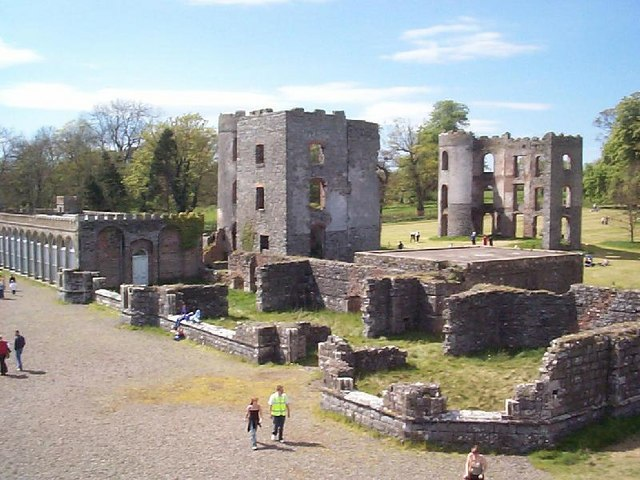
Shane's Castle, Edenduffcarrick on the north-east shores of Lough Neagh was contested by Clandeboye O'Neills.

Various different factions of the Clandeboye O'Neills felt aggrieved by the unexpected selection of Niall McBrian Fertagh O'Neill (whose father had been assassinated by Shane O'Neill) as lord of Clandeboye, causing internal conflict. The situation was such that the English authorities in the form of John Perrot, the new Lord Deputy of Ireland, intervened in 1584. Lower Clandeboye was split into two: three-quarters, based around Belfast, were awarded to Shane McBrian O'Neill (son of the late Sir Brian McPhelim O'Neill), while the remaining quarter, based around Edenduffcarrick, was awarded to Hugh Oge O'Neill (son of Sir Brian McPhelim's brother Hugh). Meanwhile, Conn McNeill O'Neill, the son of Niall McBrian Fertagh O'Neill, was confirmed in his lordship of Upper Clandeboye. Shane McBrian O'Neill and Hugh Oge O'Neill bitterly contested the control of Lower Clandeboye, particularly Shane's Castle at Edenduffcarrick. Despite an attempt at arbitration, Hugh Oge was killed at the Castle in the dispute in 1586 and was succeeded by his brother Neill McHugh O'Neill at Lower Clandeboye (Edenduffcarrick), the conflict between the two factions caused "great dissension between them and great slaughter often by both parties committed."

Shane McBrian O'Neill of Lower Clandeboye (Belfast) was a Member of Parliament for County Antrim in 1585. He briefly rebelled against the Crown during Tyrone's Rebellion in 1598 but was soon reconciled and was pardoned as a result. The English authorities were unable to hold back the forces of Hugh O'Neill, Earl of Tyrone and so when his nephew Brian MacArt O'Neill was sent into Clandeboye to control its military affairs, it brought the area into collaboration. This conflict, in alliance with Habsburg Spain, was a predominantly Ulster-based Irish Rising against Protestant English rule and brought together what were usually enemies such as the O'Neills of Tyrone and the O'Donnells of Tyrconnell in common cause. The Earl of Tyrone had been married to Shane McBrian's sister Katherine O'Neill for a time but the marriage was annulled. Only minor engagements, no major battles, took place as the area had suffered significant depopulation due to the conflicts brought about by Essex and Smith's attempted colonisation. The main negative effect on Clandeboye was the actions of Arthur Chichester after 1601, who set about burning destroying crops and animals as well as killing men, women and children without scruple. Historical records of the period say that in Clandeboye as a result of Chichester's acts, the people were reduced to cannibalism, corpses had green-mouths from eating grass and dead bodies were piled by the roadsides. This destruction was supposedly to stop Clandeboye being used as a supply base for Tyrone, but had a secondary purpose as, Chichester, in financial difficulties from his estates Devon, sought land to take in Ireland.

Conn McNeill O'Neill, the Lord of Upper Clandeboye, who was based at Castlereagh, was arrested around Christmas of 1602 (a year after his father Niall McBrian had been killed by Captain Malby). Chichester had arrested him and held him at Carrickfergus Castle, on account of one of O'Neills men having killed a Crown soldier. Chichester offered to execute him without trial, potentially as a pretext to taking land for himself. Fortune favoured Conn McNeill as, on the death of Elizabeth I, James VI of Scotland ascended to the thrones of England and Ireland in July 1603, with the opportunity of a clean slate. Conn McNeill's wife approached Hugh Montgomery, a Scotsman with extensive political connections and agreed if he could break Conn out of jail and arrange a royal pardon for him, then he would share half of Upper Clandeboye with Montgomery. Upon hearing about this, James Hamilton, wanted in on the deal and the plan was changed to a three-way split. The jailbreak was hatched and was successful, the three men visited James and secured the pardon in London before returning to Ulster via Scotland. Montgomery and Hamilton began a private, non-government plantation of the area with Scots from Ayrshire in 1606 and are seen as founding fathers of the Ulster Scots people. Some of the native Irish tenants were moved out to Dufferin.

== Legacy ==
=== O'Neill heirs of Clandeboye ===
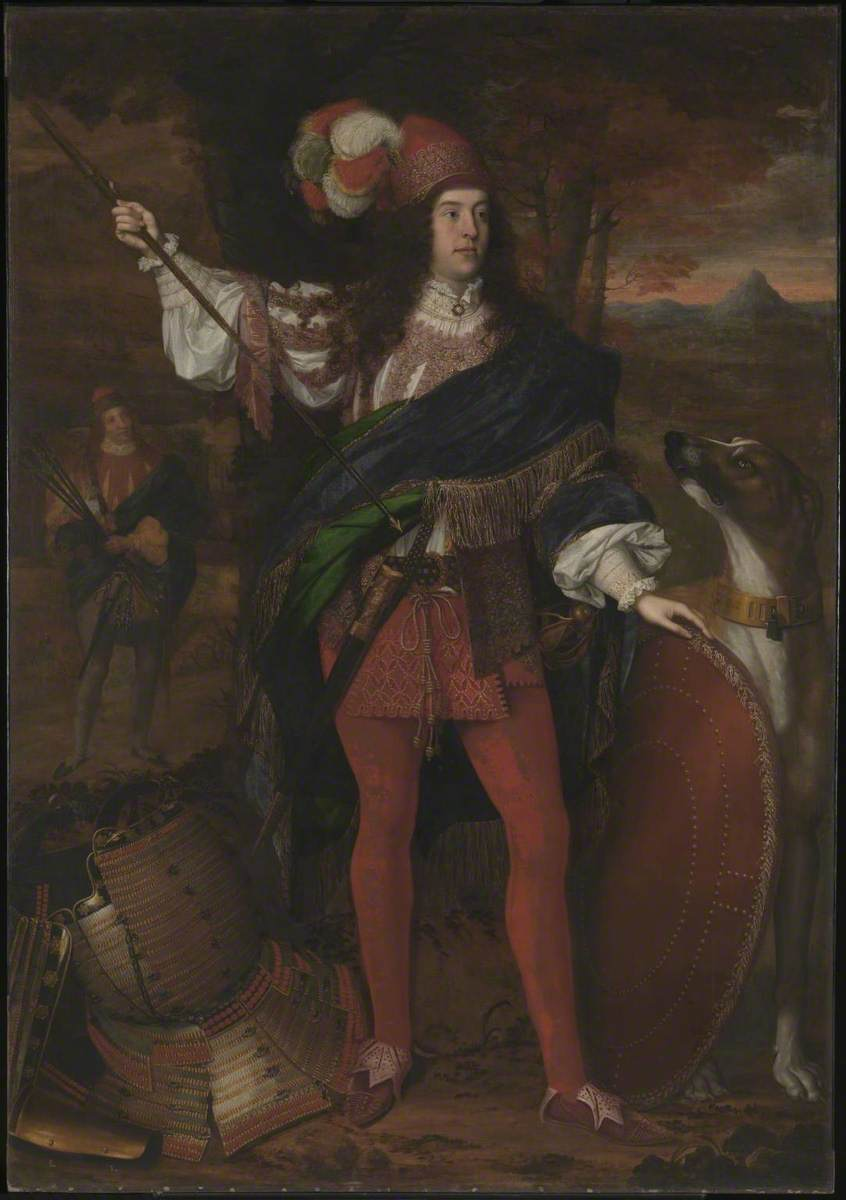
Portrait of Sir Neil O'Neill, 2nd Baronet of Killelagh by John Michael Wright (1680). He was a 3-times great-grandson of Phelim Bacagh O'Neill, King of Clandeboye.

The most prominent heirs of the Clandeboye O'Neills were from the Lords of Lower Clandeboye (Belfast) branch, as the successors of Shane McBrian O'Neill, son of the famous Sir Brian McPhelim O'Neill. They were able to secure Shane's Castle back from their cousins. They were noted for their staunch loyalty to the Stuart dynasty, serving in prominent positions in the Army of Charles II, this included; Colonel Cormac O'Neill (died 1707), Captain John O'Neill (died 1687) and Captain Phelim Dubh O'Neill (died 1676). A son of Captain John was Colonel Charles O'Neill (died 1716) who served in the Army of James II. After inheriting Shane's Castle and converting to Anglicanism, John O'Neill (died 1798) from this line was made Viscount O'Neill by George III. A leading statesman, he died at the Battle of Antrim. His two sons, also Viscounts, were involved in Irish politics too. They established Tullymore Lodge in Broughshane and Cleggan Lodge, originally a shooting lodge. (Note: Since the 19th century, one branch of the Chichester family (of English ancestry) have adopted the surname "O'Neill." This took place upon the death of John O'Neill, 3rd Viscount O'Neill from the Lords of Lower Clandeboye (Belfast) branch, as William Chichester claimed the rights to the properties of this line as heir, including Shane's Castle, being made Baron O'Neill. Chichester's great-grandfather Rev. Arthur Chichester, Anglican Vicar of Randalstown had been married to Mary O'Neill, granddaughter of Sean an Franca O'Neill (1716 — 1739), from the Clandeboye O'Neills. This branch of the Chichesters have been prominent in Northern Ireland unionist politics with Terence O'Neill and Hugh O'Neill, 1st Baron Rathcavan.)

A junior line of this branch, the O'Neills of Feeva (descended from Conn O'Neill (died 1585), a younger son of Sir Brian McPhelim O'Neill), were deeply involved in Jacobitism in Ireland and internationally. Colonel Conn O'Neill (died 1716) and Captain Conn Modera O'Neill (died 1740) both served in the Army of James II and his son the Old Pretender, James Francis Edward Stuart. Some of these men fled abroad to the European Continent and were Wild Geese who served in the French and Spanish Armies. Famously, Captain Conn O'Neill of the French Army was present at the Battle of Culloden in 1746 and was instrumental in asking Flora MacDonald to help Bonnie Prince Charlie escape the Redcoats from the island of Benbecula in the Outer Hebrides. Despite initially being a junior line, after the death of the last Viscount O'Neill in 1855, this was the only known surviving branch from Sir Brian McPhelim and still had living members towards the end of the 19th century with Charles Henry O'Neill, a barrister living in Dublin, who was recognised as The O'Neill Clandeboye.

The branch of the Clandeboye O'Neills who were Lords of Lower Clandeboye (Edenduffcarrick), successors to Neill McHugh O'Neill, brother of Hugh Oge O'Neill, who ruled Clandeboye north of Kells, generally distinguished themselves by their loyalty to the Tudor and then Stuart Crown in Ireland. Niall O'Neill, the Lord of Lower Clandeboye, had died in 1600 fighting for the Crown during the Nine Years' War against the Earl of Tyrone. In 1626, during the reign of Charles I, his son Niall Og O'Neill (died 31 March 1628) was the High Sheriff of Antrim. They served the Royalist cause during the Wars of the Three Kingdoms and after showing bravery at the Battle of Edgehill, Niall Oge's son Sir Brian O'Neill was awarded with the Baronetcy of Upper Claneboys. His younger brother, Sir Henry O'Neill, was likewise rewarded with the Baronetcy of Killelagh. The Killelagh O'Neills were Jacobites, loyal to James II during the Williamite War: Sir Neill O'Neill was his Lord Lieutenant of Armagh. They were stripped of their titles because of this and in any case, soon became extinct. Despite also serving James II, their close cousins, the "Upper Claneboys" O'Neills, in the form of Sir Brian O'Neill, managed to survived the Orangist Revolution of 1688 politically unscathed before this line eventually became extinct in the male line by 1799.

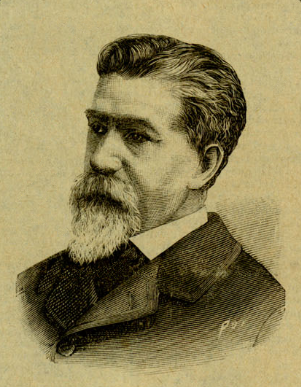
Jorge Torlades O'Neill I was The O'Neill Clandeboye from 1887 to 1890. He and many of his line lived in exile in Portugal for several centuries.

The Clandeboye O'Neills directly descended from the last sovereign King of Clandeboye, Murtagh Dulenagh O'Neill, continue to exist to this day and claim the title of The O'Neill Clandeboye. After being nudged out of power by junior lines who divided Clandeboye, the senior branch of the family (who retained property in Toome for a time), were implicated in Tyrone's Rebellion, served under Owen Roe O'Neill in his Ulster Army of the Irish Confederate Forces (in the form of Colonel Ever O'Neill) and then Felix O'Neill (died 11 September 1709), his son, served as part of Lord Galmoye Regiment in the Jacobite Irish Army, before prolifically serving in the Irish Brigade of the Royal French Army. Felix's grandson João O'Neill went to Portugal and settled near Almada. His son, Carlos O'Neill, was a Professed Knight of the Military Order of Christ and was familiar with John VI of Portugal. He was the first of many to belong to this Order and to elite positions in Portuguese society: one descendant was even made Viscount of Santa Mónica. They remained in touch with Irish affairs and Jorge Torlades O'Neill II was a friend of Roger Casement, donated money to construct an Irish language school at Tuam and helped to arm the Irish Volunteers. In 1896, this Jorge submitted his genealogy to the Somerset Herald in London: he was subsequently recognised as having the only pedigree in the Office of Arms showing descent from the "Princes of Tyrone and Claneboy." Upon that Letters Patent, Pope Leo XIII, the King of Spain and the King of Portugal all recognised him as the Prince of Clanaboy, Tyrone, Ulster, as the Count of Tyrone and the Head of the Royal House of O'Neill and all of its septs. Recognised by the Chief Herald of Ireland in 1945 as the Princes of Clannaboy, the current representative is Hugo Ricciardi O'Neill (born 1939).

== Kings of Clandeboye ==
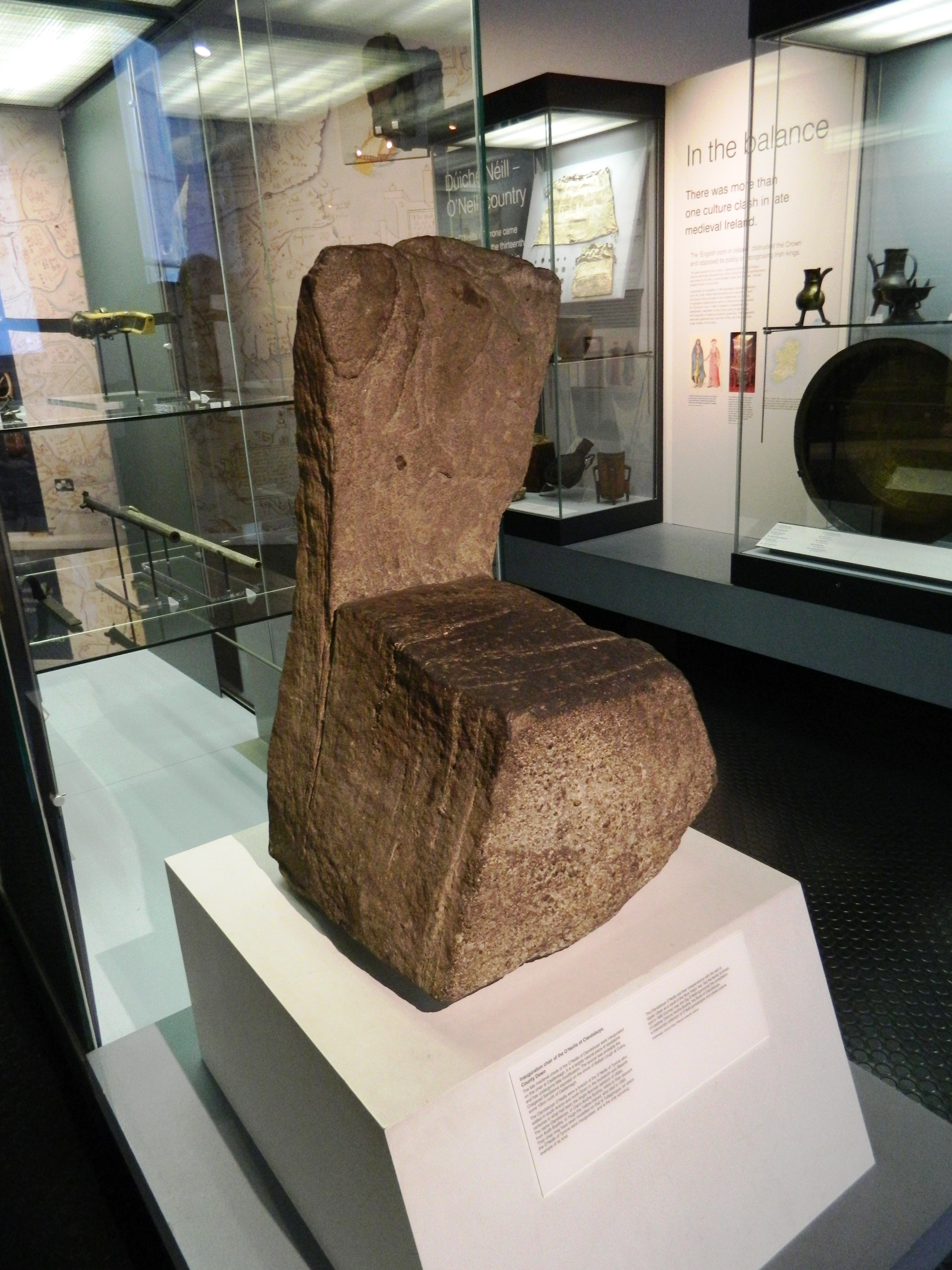
The royal inauguration chair of the Clandeboye O'Neills, currently in the Ulster Museum. The kings were raised to the throne at Castlereagh.

Below is a list of the O'Neill sovereign Kings of Clandeboye. The last unified king of Clandeboye was Murtagh Dulenach O'Neill, as the title was subsequently split between Lower Clandeboye and Upper Clandeboye. In 1584, Lower Clandeboye was further split in two, with different bases at Belfast and Edenduffcarrick. Clandeboye itself was later divided between County Antrim, County Down and County Coleraine (later County Londonderry) in the Kingdom of Ireland.

- Brian O'Neill (1283–1295), also King of Tyrone
- Henry O'Neill (1295–1347), also King of Tyrone
- Muirchertach Ceannfada O'Neill (1347–1395)
- Brian Ballagh O'Neill (1395–1425)
- Murtagh Roe O'Neill (1425–1441 & 1444–1468)
- Hugh Boy II O'Neill (1441–1444)
- Conn O'Neill (1468–1482)
- Niall Mór O'Neill (1482–1512)
- Hugh Dubh O'Neill (1512–1524)
- Brian Ballagh II O'Neill (1524–1529)
- Phelim Bacagh O'Neill (1529–1533)
- Niall Oge O'Neill (1533–1537)
- Murtagh Dulenach O'Neill (1537–)

Lower Clandeboye

- Brian McPhelim O'Neill (1556–1575)

Lower Clandeboye (Belfast)

- Shane McBrian O'Neill (1584–1616)

Lower Clandeboye (Edenduffcarrick)

- Hugh Oge McHugh O'Neill (1584–1586)
- Neill McHugh O'Neill (1586–1600)

Upper Clandeboye

- Brian Faghartach O'Neill (–1548)
- Niall McBrian Fertagh O'Neill (1548–1584)
- Conn McNeill O'Neill (1584–1619)

== Diocese of Down and Connor ==
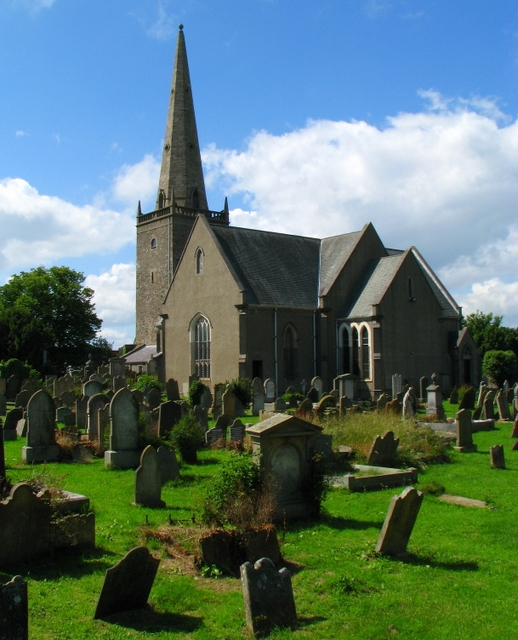
Bangor Abbey, an ancient Gaelic establishment, fell under Clandeboye during the Late Middle Ages.

The religion which predominated at an official level in Clandeboye was Catholic Christianity. The territory of Clandeboye was associated with the Diocese of Down and Connor under the Bishop of Down and Connor. This was formed on 29 July 1439 as Pope Eugene IV issued a papal bull merging the positions of Bishop of Down and Bishop of Connor (these diocese having been formed in 1111 at the Synod of Ráth Breasail, long before Clandeboye had existed).

Clandeboye hosted some significant monastic houses, typically pre-dating the entry of the O'Neills into the area. Most of these were shut down during the dissolution of the monasteries under the influence of Henry VIII from the Tudor dynasty: legislation was introduced into the Parliament of Ireland in 1537 and the policy enforced on the ground more directly after 1541 as part of the Tudor conquest of Ireland. The most prestigious of which was Bangor Abbey, of ancient Gaelic origin, which was under the Augustinian Canons Regular during the time of Clandeboye. The Augustinians were also at Movilla Abbey, an old Gaelic foundation. Nendrum Monastery, founded by St. Patrick, was used as a parish church until the 15th century. Other prominent monasteries include the Norman-founded establishments of Grey Abbey, under the Cistercians and Newtownards Priory, under the Order of Preachers (Dominicans). The Order of Friars Minor Conventual (Franciscans) were also at Carrickfergus Friary, but Clandeboye's influence over them differed from time to time. Holywood Priory, a 7th-century Gaelic foundation, was also placed under the Franciscans by Niall O’Neill after the Black Death.

The local chapel of importance to the O'Neills was Knockollumkille, near their headquarters at Castlereagh, founded by Columba of Iona in much earlier times. By the start of the 18th century, it was no longer in use and all that remains of the actual building of this Church today is part of a wall of the Knock Burial Ground, Clarawood, Belfast.

== See also ==
- Leabhar Cloinne Aodha Buidhe
- Branches of the Cenél nEógain
- Baron Dufferin and Claneboye
- Clandeboye Estate
- Clandonnell

== Sources ==
Oxford Concise Companion to Irish Literature, Robert Welsh, 1996. ISBN 0-19-280080-9
