= Hugh Boy II O'Neill =

Hugh Boy II O'Neill (Irish: Aodh Buidhe Ó Néill) was a king of Clandeboye in medieval Ireland. A son of Brian Ballagh, O'Neill was second-in-command to his older brother Murtagh Roe O'Neill and helped him take the lordship of Clandeboye after their father's death in 1425 by dispatching their uncle and main rival Henry Caoch O'Neill.

After a short but fierce conflict between O'Neill and Murtagh around 1441–1442, Murtagh ceded the lordship to his younger brother. O'Neill however would die on 2 May 1444 from wounds received in a raid on the Magennis' of Iveagh. Murtagh would retake the lordship and hold it until 1468 when O'Neill's eldest son Conn seized it. Another son, Brian (d. 1488), would be the father of Donnell Donn O'Neill, eponymous founder of the Clandonnell O'Neills.

Hugh Boy II O'Neill Clandeboye O'Neill Cadet branch of the O'Neill Dynasty of Tyrone Died: 2 May 1444
Regnal titles
Preceded by Murtagh Roe O'Neill	Lord of Clandeboye c1441-1444	Succeeded by Murtagh Roe O'Neill
