= Murtagh Dulenagh O'Neill =

Lord of Clandeboye in medieval Ireland

Murtagh Dulenagh O'Neill (Irish: Muirchertach Duileanach Ó Néill) was a lord of Clandeboye in medieval Ireland. A son of Niall Mór O'Neill, he succeeded his brother, Niall Oge O'Neill, to the lordship of Clandeboye after his death in 1537.

His hold over Clandeboye was gradually weakened by his nephews, the sons of Niall Oge and Phelim Bacagh O'Neill. By 1533 he was lord of Clandeboye in name only as his rivals had divided the majority of Clandeboye between them founding the lordships of Lower and Upper Clandeboye. Despite having eight "tall sons", they could only muster twenty-four horsemen between them. As such he was the last of the family to be lord over the entirety of Clandeboye. O'Neill died after 1556, however as a sign of how far his stock had fallen his death was not recorded.

His epithet of Duileanach suggests that he may have been fostered by the O'Doolan's found in what is now the barony of Castlereagh, which was within the Clandeboy domain.

== Issue and progeny ==
O'Neill was married to Margaret O'Byrne of Wicklow and had a son called Daniel (Domhnall), ancestor of the Portuguese branch of the family, who, as descendants of the last sovereign King of Clandeboye have claimed the titles of The O'Neill Clandeboye and Prince of Clandeboye (supported by several European countries). Another son, Hugh (Aodh Buidhe), along with his family retained some land until the seventeenth-century around Toome in south-west modern-day County Antrim, Northern Ireland.

- Aodh Buidhe McMurtagh O'Neill
  - Niall McHugh O'Neill (died 1618) — implicated in Tyrone's Rebellion
    - Art Oge O'Neill (died 1 January 1661) — member of the Irish Confederacy
- Niall O'Neill
- Domhnall O'Neill
  - Conn Buidhe O'Neill
    - Féilim Dubh O'Neill
      - Ever O'Neill — Colonel in Irish Confederate Army
        - Felix O'Neill (died 11 September 1709) — Officer in Army of James II and for France
          - Conn Ó Néill
            - João O'Neill (died 21 January 1788) — lived in Portugal

Murtagh Dulenagh O'Neill Clandeboye O'Neill Cadet branch of the O'Neill Dynasty of Tyrone Died: After 1556
Regnal titles
Preceded by Niall Oge O'Neill	Lord of Clandeboye; 1537-After 1556	Title abolished
