= Brian Ballagh O'Neill =

Brian Ballagh O'Neill (Irish: Brian Ballach Ó Néill) was a king of Clandeboye in medieval Ireland. He succeeded his father, Muirchertach Ceannfada O'Neill, to the kingship of Clandeboye after his death in 1395. He reigned until his own death in battle in 1425, after which he was succeeded by his son Murtagh Roe O'Neill who had to contend with his uncle Henry Caoch O'Neill for it. O'Neill's nickname ballach meant "freckled". A younger son, Hugh Boy II O'Neill, would also become lord of Clandeboye.

O'Neill was the common ancestor of the Clandonnell O'Neills, Killetra O'Neills, via his sons Hugh Boy and Cú Uladh respectively.

Brian Ballagh O'Neill Clandeboye O'Neill Cadet branch of the O'Neill Dynasty of Tyrone Died: 1425
Regnal titles
Preceded by Muirchertach Ceannfada O'Neill	Lord of Clandeboye; 1395-1425	Succeeded by Murtagh Roe O'Neill
