= Niall Mór O'Neill =

Niall Mór O'Neill (Irish: Niall Mór Ó Néill) was a lord of Clandeboye in medieval Ireland. He succeeded his father, Conn O'Neill, to the lordship after his death in 1482. He reigned until his own death in 1512, after which he was succeeded by his son Hugh O'Neill. O'Neill's nickname Mór meant "great".

O'Neill's chief residence was at Edenduffcarrick on the shore's of Lough Neagh in modern-day County Antrim, Northern Ireland. In his obituary in the Annals of the Four Masters it is stated that he did not pay homage to the O'Neill's of Tyrone, the O'Donnell's or the English.

== Family ==
O'Neill was married to Inion Dubh, a daughter of Hugh Roe O'Donnell, king of Tyrconnell. Five of his sons would become lord of Clandeboye:

- Hugh Duff, king of Clandeboye from 1512 to 1524.
- Brian Ballagh, king from 1524 to 1529.
- Phelim Bacagh, king from 1529 to 1533. Ancestor of the lords of Lower Clandeboye and the Lords O'Neill of Shane's Castle.
- Niall Oge, king from 1533 to 1537.
- Murtagh Dulenach O'Neill, king from 1537 to 1556. Last lord of a united Clandeboye.

Niall Mór O'Neill Clandeboye O'Neill Cadet branch of the O'Neill Dynasty of Tyrone Died: 1512
Regnal titles
Preceded by Conn O'Neill	Lord of Clandeboye; 1482-1512	Succeeded by Hugh O'Neill
