= Murtagh Roe O'Neill =

Lord of Clandeboye in medieval Ireland

Murtagh Roe O'Neill (Irish: Muircheartach Ruadh Ó Néill) was a lord of Clandeboye in medieval Ireland. He succeeded his father Brian Ballagh O'Neill who died in 1425 to the lordship of Clandeboye. Before O'Neill could take control he and his second-in-command, his younger brother Hugh Boy, had to remove their uncle Henry Caoch O'Neill who strongly challenged their claim.

By the early 1440s despite initially working together, O'Neill and Hugh Boy would engage in a short but fierce conflict which resulted in O'Neill ceding the lordship to his brother. Hugh Boy however would die on 2 May 1444 from wounds received in a raid on the Magennis' of Iveagh. O'Neill would regain the lordship and hold it until 1468 when Hugh Boy's son Conn seized it from him after engaging in battle. Despite this in 1475 he was still chief of the Clandeboye O'Neill clan. O'Neill died sometime after 1475.

O'Neill's nickname ruadh meant "red"

Murtagh Roe O'Neill Clandeboye O'Neill Cadet branch of the O'Neill Dynasty of Tyrone Died: 1475
Regnal titles
Preceded by Brian Ballagh O'Neill	Lord of Clandeboye; 1st reign c1425-c1441	Succeeded by Hugh Boy II O'Neill
Preceded by Hugh Boy II O'Neill	Lord of Clandeboye; 2nd reign 1444-1468	Succeeded by Conn O'Neill
