= Muirchertach Ceannfada O'Neill =

Lord of Clandeboye in medieval Ireland

Muirchertach Ceannfada O'Neill (Irish: Muirchertach Ceannfada Ó Néill), also known as Murtagh O'Neill and Maurice O'Neill, was a lord of Clandeboye in medieval Ireland. He succeeded his father, Henry O'Neill, to the kingship of Clandeboye after his death in 1347. In 1354 his forces along with the English inflicted a heavy defeat on Áed Remar O'Neill, king of Tyrone.

It was during Muirchertach's reign that the Clandeboye O'Neills seem to have come into possession of large tracts of land in modern-day County Antrim, Northern Ireland. These lands primarily belonged to the O'Lynn kingdom of Uí Tuirtre. In 1359 O'Neill's uncle Hugh killed the tanist of Uí Tuirtre, Murtagh O'Lynn. In 1368 the king of Uí Tuirtre, Thomas O'Lynn, died. After this the O'Lynn's appear to have been removed from the kingship.

O'Neill reigned until his own death in 1395 and was succeeded by his son Brian Ballagh O'Neill. Another son, Henry Caoach O'Neill, would unsuccessfully contend for the lordship after Brian's death in 1425. O'Neill's nickname ceannfada (English: "Kennedy") meant long-headed or prudent.

Muirchertach Ceannfada O'Neill Clandeboye O'Neill Cadet branch of the O'Neill Dynasty of Tyrone Died: 1395
Regnal titles
Preceded by Henry O'Neill	Lord of Clandeboye; 1347-1395	Succeeded by Brian Ballagh O'Neill
