= Brian McPhelim O'Neill =

Lord of Lower Clandeboye (c.1520–1574)

Sir Brian McPhelim Bacagh O'Neill (c. 1520 – November 1574) was Chief of the Name of Clan O'Neill Lower Clandeboye, an Irish clan in north-eastern Ireland during the Tudor conquest of Ireland.

== Life ==
O'Neill was the son of Phelim Bacagh O'Neill. In 1556 he became lord of Lower Clandeboye. O'Neill sided with the English government in Ireland to help bolster his position against the threat of Shane O'Neill of Tyrone to the west and a large influx of Scots Highlanders from Clan MacDonald of Dunnyveg led by Somhairle Buidhe MacDonnell into the Glens of Antrim to his north. In 1568, Brian McPhelim O'Neill would be knighted for his service to the Crown as part of William Piers' campaign against Shane O'Neill of Tyrone.

O'Neill and his father-in-law, Brian Carragh O'Neill, would wage a private war against Shane O'Neill's successor, Turlough Luineach O'Neill. The government were not impressed and grew suspicious of O'Neill.

In 1571, Sir Thomas Smith, Queen Elizabeth's principal Secretary of State, was able to get a grant for the entire territory of Clandeboye. While the Clan O'Neill of Lower Clandeboye had been established in that area for two centuries, it had once been part of the Earldom of Ulster, which upon the death of its last earl in the 15th-century passed into ownership of the Crown.

Smith had his son Thomas put in charge of starting a colony and planned to firstly settle the Ards peninsula and then eventually moving westwards through Clandeboye via a mixture of conquest and plantation. The planned plantation was mishandled especially due to Smith advertising the venture, and Smith went to Carrickfergus to negotiate with Brian O'Neill who was unhappy about the plans. The negotiations failed to happen and Brian McPhelim O'Neill set about razing any buildings (excluding abbeys and priories) he could find throughout the northern Ards peninsula that could provide shelter.

In 1573, a similar scheme for the plantation of County Antrim (the south of which was north Clandeboye) by The 1st Earl of Essex overtook Smith's grant, and eventually saw Smith cede his claims to north Clandeboye to Lord Essex. Despite this, Sir Brian continued to create unrest and disturbances throughout his territory that heavily affected the schemes. Eventually the scheme had to be altered focusing on coastal settlements, however this too failed due to Sir Brian. Eventually Essex had to console himself with a grant for the Islandmagee peninsula on the east coast of Antrim, to which he was able to successfully plant all the way south to Belfast. These schemes were all part of the Enterprise of Ulster.

== Death ==
In November 1574 in County Dublin, Sir Brian McPhelim O'Neill was hanged for opposing the local plantations.

== Division of Clandeboye ==
After his death, Lord Essex promoted Sir Brian's son-in-law, Neill McBrian Fertagh O'Neill, son of Brian Fertagh O'Neill who was a cousin of Sir Brian McPhelim, to the lordship of Clandeboye regardless of the other claimants. The inter-familial disputes that arose from this resulted in the Lord Deputy of Ireland, Sir John Perrot, dividing Clandeboye between the competing members of the Clandeboye O'Neill clan in 1584: Shane McBrian O'Neill, Sir Brian's son, received three-quarters of north Clandeboye; Hugh Oge O'Neill, son of Sir Brian's brother Hugh, received a quarter of north Clandeboye, centred on Edenduffcarrick; Con McNeill O'Neill, Neill McBrian Fertagh's uncle and Sir Brian's cousin, was granted all of south Clandeboye, afterwards known as Upper Clandeboy. North Clandeboye would become known as Lower Clandeboye.

== Fate of Clandeboye ==
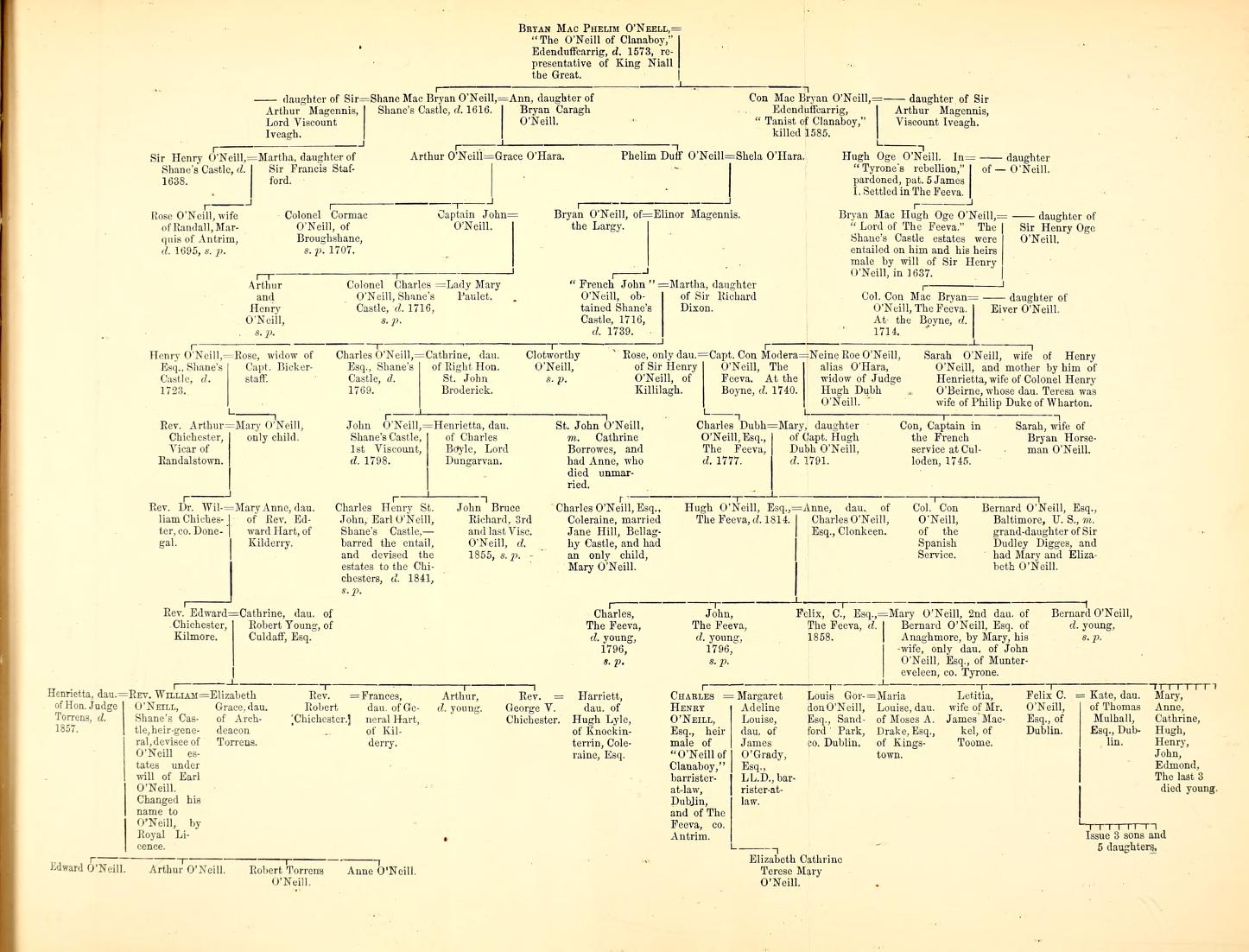
O'Neill family tree showing descent of Viscount O'Neills from Brian McPhelim.

Despite Sir Brian McPhelim's attempts to thwart English settlement of his lands, the son of Neill McBrian Fertagh, Con, who succeeded his father as lord of Upper Clandeboye, made a deal with Hugh Montgomery and James Hamilton that resulted in the three-fold division of the lands comprising his estate in 1605. He sold off the rest and died in 1619. Their subsequent plantations expanded rapidly. The scheme for settling County Antrim, including the territory of Lower Clandeboye, passed from Essex to Sir Arthur Chichester, who was more successful than his predecessor. A direct line great-great-great-great grandson of Brian was John O'Neill, 1st Viscount O'Neill.

== Issue and progeny ==
Son from relationship with Amy O'Neill, daughter of Brian Carrach O'Neill was chief of Clandonnell.

- Shane Mac Brian O'Neill (died 23 April 1616), Lord of Lower Clandeboye (Belfast)
  - Shane Oge O'Neill (died 22 May 1618)
  - Sir Henry O'Neill (died 8 April 1638)
    - Rose O'Neill, Marchioness of Antrim (1631 — 1695) — wife of Randal MacDonnell, 1st Marquess of Antrim
  - Phelim Dubh O'Neill (died June 1676) — Captain in Army of King Charles II
    - Brian O'Neill (died 1669)
      - Sean an Franca O'Neill (1716 — 1739) — inherited Shane's Castle
        - Charles O'Neill (died 16 August 1769)
          - John O'Neill, 1st Viscount O'Neill (16 January 1740 — 17 June 1798)
          - St. John O'Neill (6 May 1741 — 1790)
        - Henry O'Neill (died 1721)
          - Mary O'Neill — married Reverend Arthur Chichester
      - Henry O'Neill
    - Arthur O'Neill
  - Hugh Ruadh O'Neill (died 17 December 1664)
  - Art Oge O'Neill (1600 — 25 March 1677)
    - Cormac O'Neill (died 1707) — Colonel in Army of King Charles II
    - John O'Neill (died 3 July 1687) — Captain in Army of King Charles II
      - Charles O'Neill (died 1716) — Colonel in the Army of James II (married Lady Mary Paulet)

Issue from an unknown Scotswoman.

- Phelim Dubh O'Neill
- Conn O'Neill (died 1585)
  - Aodh Oge O'Neill (died 20 March 1616) — implicated in Tyrone's Rebellion in 1606
    - Brian O'Neill of the Feevagh
      - Conn O'Neill (died 1716) — Colonel in the Army of James II
        - Conn Modera O'Neill (died 1740) — Captain in the Army of James II
          - Charles Dubh O'Neill (died 1777)
            - Charles O'Neill
            - Hugh O'Neill (1730 — 1814)
              - Charles O'Neill (died 1796)
              - John O'Neill (1759 — 1796)
              - Felix Cunningham O'Neill (1788 — 1858)
                - Charles Henry O'Neill (1809 — 1865)
                  - Elizabeth Catherine Mary Theresa O'Neill (1841 — 1905)
                - Louis Gordon O'Neill (1813 — 19 February 1891)
                - Felix Cunningham O'Neill (1816 — 1892)
                - Hugh O'Neill (1818 — 1895)
            - Conn O'Neill — Colonel in the Spanish Army
            - Bernard O'Neill — lived in Baltimore, Maryland
          - Conn O'Neill — Captain in French Army at Battle of Culloden
- Niall O'Neill

Brian McPhelim O'Neill Clandeboye O'Neill Cadet branch of the O'Neill Dynasty of Tyrone Born: c1520 Died: 1574
Regnal titles
New title	Lord of Lower Clandeboye; 1556-1574	Succeeded by
