= Brian Ballagh II O'Neill =

Lord of Clandeboye in medieval Ireland

Brian Ballagh II O'Neill (Irish: Brian Ballach Ó Néill) was a lord of Clandeboye in medieval Ireland. A son of Niall Mór O'Neill, he succeeded his brother, Hugh O'Neill, to the lordship of Clandeboye after his death in 1524. He reigned until his own death in 1529, after which he was succeeded by his brother Phelim Bacagh O'Neill. O'Neill's nickname ballach meant "freckled".

Brian Ballagh II O'Neill Clandeboye O'Neill Cadet branch of the O'Neill Dynasty of Tyrone Died: 1529
Regnal titles
Preceded by Hugh O'Neill	Lord of Clandeboye; 1524-1529	Succeeded by Phelim Bacagh O'Neill
