= Sir Neil O'Neill, 2nd Baronet =

Irish military officer (1658–1690)

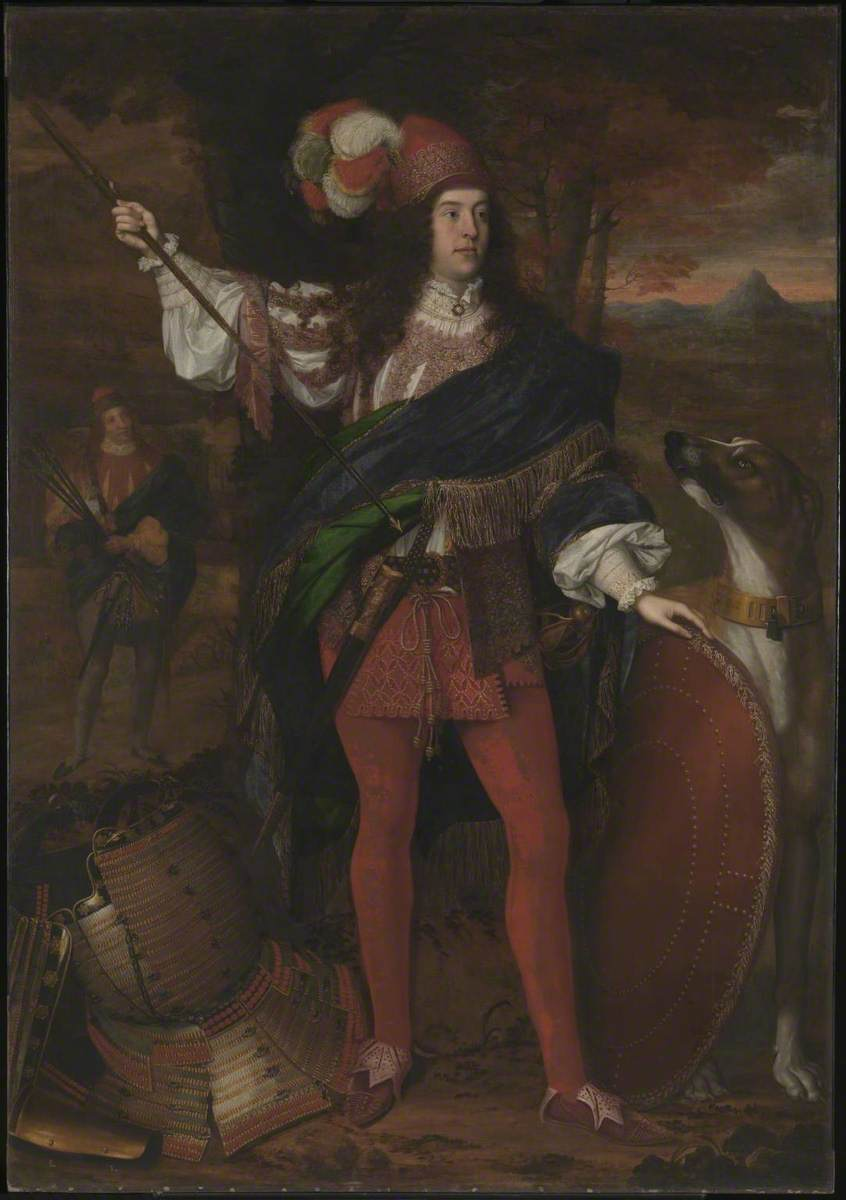
Portrait Sir Neil O'Neill of John Michael Wright (1680), now in the Tate

Sir Neil O'Neill, 2nd Baronet (Irish: Niall Ua Néill; January 1658 – 8 July 1690) was an Irish military officer who was the Lord of Clandeboye, a powerful clan of the ancient Northern Uí Néill. O'Neill's portrait from 1680 by John Michael Wright is historically significant because it is the only surviving contemporary presentation of the traditional costume of an Irish chieftain. At his feet is the armour of a Japanese samurai as a symbol of victory over the oppression of Catholics; next to him is an Irish wolfhound as a symbol of Ireland.

== Life ==
An Irish Catholic noble and military leader, he was born in January 1658, the son of Sir Henry O'Neill, 1st Baronet of Shane's Castle, Killelagh, and Eleanor Talbot, daughter of Sir William Talbot, 1st Baronet. His uncle was Richard Talbot, 1st Earl of Tyrconnell and Viceroy of Ireland. His male line genealogy is Neil son of Henry son of Niall Og son of Niall son of Hugh son of Felim Baccach son of Niall Mor son of Conn son of Aodh Buidhe son of Brian Ballach son of Muircheartach Cennfhada (Chiefs of Clandeboye) son of Henry, King of Tír Eóghain County Tyrone.

O'Neill was appointed Lord Lieutenant of Armagh by King James VII and II in 1689. He led 800 Jacobite dragoons at the Battle of the Boyne against Williamite troops under the command of the Duke of Schomberg and was killed in action. He was wounded in the battle, near Slane. He was carried first to Dublin and thence to Waterford where he died of his wounds due to the negligence of his surgeons. His grave is in the cemetery of the French Church in Waterford; the gravestone reads:

Here lyes the body of S. Neal O'Neill, Baronet of Killelag in the County of Antrim, who dyed ye 8th of July, in the year 1690, at the age of 32 years and six months. He married the second daughter of Lord Viscount Molyneux, of Sefton, in Lancashire, in England. Reguiescant in Pace.

== Family ==
O'Neill married in 1677 or 1683 Frances Molyneux, second daughter of The 3rd Viscount Molyneux, the Lord Lieutenant of Lancashire, and his wife Mary Barlow. With her, he had at least four daughters: Rose, Mary, Elizabeth and Ann. His wife and daughters were painted by the Irish painter Garret Murphy c. 1700. Rose married Nicholas Wogan of Rathcoffey, and Anne married John Segrave.

As he had no son, the title passed to his brother Daniel, but was forfeited in 1691. Daniel managed to retain much of the family estates, but as his brother had died deeply in debt, he was obliged to sell Killyleagh in 1703. Frances died in 1732. His only sister Rose, foster daughter of Rose O'Neill the Marchioness of Antrim, married Captain Con Modera O'Neill, son of Colonel Con mac Brian O'Neill, both of whom fought with him at the Battle of Boyne, and the former leading the heroic efforts of the Irish forces at the Second Siege of Aughrim.

Baronetage of Ireland
Preceded by Henry O'Neill	Baronet (of Killelagh); 1680–1690	Succeeded by Daniel O'Neill
