= List of kings and lords of Clandeboye =

This article lists the kings and lords of Clandeboye (Irish: Clann Aodha Buídhe), a Gaelic túath of the Cenél nEógain, located in the eastern part of Ulster in the north of Ireland. They are listed from their date of ascension to date of death, unless otherwise stated.

== Kings of Clandeboye and Tyrone, 1283—1347 ==
Name	Portrait	Birth	Marriage(s)	Death
Brian O'Neill; 1283–1295		Son of Hugh Boy O'Neill and Eleanor de Angulo	unknown	1295
Henry O'Neill; 1295–1347		Son of Brian O'Neill	unknown	1347

== Kings of Clandeboye, 1347—1555 ==
Name	Portrait	Birth	Marriage(s)	Death
Muirchertach Ceannfada O'Neill; 1347–1395		Son of Henry O'Neill	unknown	1395
Brian Ballagh O'Neill; 1395–1425		Son of Muirchertach Ceannfada O'Neill	unknown	1425
Murtagh Roe O'Neill; 1425–1441; 1444–1468		Son of Brian Ballagh O'Neill	unknown	1468
Hugh Boy II O'Neill; 1441–1444		Son of Brian Ballagh O'Neill	Finola O'Connor (died 1493)	2 May 1444
Conn O'Neill; 1468–1482		Son of Hugh Boy II O'Neill and Finola O'Connor	Mary MacDonald	1482
Niall Mór O'Neill; 1482–1512		Son of Conn O'Neill and Mary MacDonald	Inion Dubh O'Donnell	1512
Hugh Dubh O'Neill; 1512–1524		Son of Niall Mór O'Neill and Inion Dubh O'Donnell	unknown	1524
Brian Ballagh II O'Neill; 1524–1529		Son of Niall Mór O'Neill and Inion Dubh O'Donnell	unknown	1529
Phelim Bacagh O'Neill; 1529–1533		Son of Niall Mór O'Neill and Inion Dubh O'Donnell	unknown	1533
Niall Oge O'Neill; 1533–1537		Son of Niall Mór O'Neill and Inion Dubh O'Donnell	unknown	1537
Murtagh Dulenach O'Neill; 1537–		Son of Niall Mór O'Neill and Inion Dubh O'Donnell	unknown	after 1556

Murtagh Dulenaach O'Neill was the last to claim overlordship of all Clandeboye. During his reign the sons of Phelim Bacagh and Niall Oge founded their own lordships at Murtagh's expense, reducing him to lord in name only. The Annals of the Four Masters regarded Hugh, son of Niall Oge, as lord of Clandeboye until his death in 1555.

== Lords of Lower Clandeboye, 1556—1600 ==
The lordship of Lower Clandeboye (also known as Northern Clandeboye) was founded by the sons of Phelim Bacagh O'Neill. This covered the north of what is today County Down.

Name	Portrait	Birth	Marriage(s)	Death
Sir Brian McPhelim O'Neill; 1556–1575		Son of Phelim Bacagh O'Neill	unknown	20 January 1575

=== Lord of Lower Clandeboye (Belfast) ===
Name	Portrait	Birth	Marriage(s)	Death
Shane McBrian O'Neill; 1584–1616		Son of Sir Brian McPhelim O'Neill	unknown	1616

=== Lords of Lower Clandeboye (Edenduffcarrick) ===
Name	Portrait	Birth	Marriage(s)	Death
Hugh Oge McHugh O'Neill; 1584–1586		Son of Hugh O'Neill son of Phelim Bacagh O'Neill	unknown	1586
Neill McHugh O'Neill; 1586–1600		Son of Hugh O'Neill son of Phelim Bacagh O'Neill	unknown	1600

== Lords of Upper Clandeboye, —1619 ==
The lordship of Upper Clandeboye (also known as Southern Clandeboye) was founded by the sons of Niall Oge O'Neill. This covered the south of what is today County Antrim.

Name	Portrait	Birth	Marriage(s)	Death
Brian Faghartach O'Neill –1548		Son of Niall Oge O'Neill	unknown	1548
Niall McBrian Fertagh O'Neill; 1548–1584		Son of Brian Faghartach O'Neill	unknown	1601
Conn McNeill O'Neill; 1584–1619		Son of Niall McBrian Fertagh O'Neill	unknown	1619

== See also ==
- List of High Kings of Ireland
- List of kings of Tyrone
- List of kings of Tyrconnell
- List of kings of Ailech
- List of kings of Airgíalla
- List of kings of Dál nAraidi
- List of kings of Ulster
- List of kings of Dál Riata
