= Henry O'Neill (d. 1347) =

Henry O'Neill (Irish: Anrí Ó Néill) was a king of Tyrone and lord of Clandeboye in medieval Ireland. He was the son of Brian O'Neill, and a grandson of Hugh Boy O'Neill. O'Neill succeeded his kinsman Donnell O'Neill as king of Tyrone in 1325.

In 1338 O'Neill as part of a peace treaty was granted a war-ravaged region of south Antrim, from where would be founded the lordship of Clandeboye.

In 1345 the Justiciar of Ireland, Ralph de Ufford, deposed O'Neill as king of Tyrone in part for his role in the Anglo-Norman rebellion against William Donn de Burgh, 3rd Earl of Ulster. In his place de Ufford installed Áed Remar O'Neill, son of Donnell.

O'Neill died in 1347 and was succeeded in the lordship of Clandeboye by his son Muirchertach Ceannfada O'Neill.

Henry O'Neill Clandeboye O'Neill Cadet branch of the O'Neill Dynasty of Tyrone Died: 1347
Regnal titles
Preceded by Donnell O'Neill	King of Tyrone; 1325-1345	Succeeded by Áed Remar O'Neill
New title	Lord of Clandeboye; 1295–1347	Succeeded by Muirchertach Ceannfada O'Neill
