= Hugh O'Neill (d. 1524) =

Hugh Duff O'Neill (Irish: Aodh Dubh Ó Néill) was a king of Clandeboye in medieval Ireland. A son of Niall Mór O'Neill, he succeeded his father to the kingship of Clandeboye after his death in 1512. He reigned until his own death in 1524 at the hands of the Cenel Conaill, after which he was succeeded by his brother Brian Ballagh II O'Neill. His daughter, Mary, married Conn Bacagh O'Neill, king of Tyrone, of which one of their sons was Shane O'Neill.

Hugh O'Neill Clandeboye O'Neill Cadet branch of the O'Neill Dynasty of Tyrone Died: 1524
Regnal titles
| Preceded by Niall Mór O'Neill | Lord of Clandeboye; 1512-1524 | Succeeded by Brian Ballagh II O'Neill |
