= Niall Oge O'Neill =

Irish peer

Niall Oge O'Neill (Irish: Niall Óg Ó Néill) was a lord of Clandeboye in medieval Ireland. A son of Niall Mór O'Neill, he succeeded his brother, Phelim Bacagh O'Neill, to the lordship of Clandeboye after his death in 1533. He reigned until his own death in 1537, after which he was succeeded by his brother Murtagh Dulenach O'Neill. O'Neill's nickname "Óg" meant "young".

== Issue ==
- Brian Faghartach O'Neill (died 1548) — Lord of Upper Clandeboye
  - Shane O'Neill
  - Niall McBrian Fertagh O'Neill (died 5 February 1601) — Lord of Upper Clandeboye
    - Conn O'Neill (died 1619) — Lord of Upper Clandeboye
      - Daniel O'Neill (1612 – 24 October 1664) — Colonel in the Army of Charles I & Charles II
      - Conn Oge O'Neill (died 13 June 1643) — Colonel in Irish Confederate Army
    - Aodh Meirgeach O'Neill
    - Tuathal O'Neill
      - Phelim McToole O'Neill (died 22 June 1650) — Colonel in Irish Confederate Army, killed at Battle of Scarrifholis
      - Henry McToole O'Neill
        - Owen O'Neill — Captain in Army of James II
- Aodh O'Neill (died 1555) — The Annals of the Four Masters regarded him as King of Clandeboye
  - Eoghan O'Neill (died 5 May 1601)
    - Brian Modortha O'Neill
- Phelim Dubh O'Neill
- Sir Conn O'Neill (died Jan 1589)
  - Domhnall O'Neill (died 1584)

Niall Oge O'Neill Clandeboye O'Neill Cadet branch of the O'Neill Dynasty of Tyrone Died: 1537
Regnal titles
Preceded by Phelim Bacagh O'Neill	Lord of Clandeboye; 1529-1537	Succeeded by Murtagh Dulenach O'Neill
