= Conn O'Neill (d. 1482) =

Irish noble

Conn O'Neill (Irish: Conn Ó Néill) was a lord of Clandeboye in medieval Ireland. He seized the lordship from his uncle Murtagh Roe O'Neill in 1468. However, he appears to have let him remain as chief of the Clandeboye O'Neills. O'Neill reigned until he died in 1482, after which he was succeeded by his son Niall Mór O'Neill. O'Neill was married to Mary MacDonald.

Conn O'Neill Clandeboye O'Neill Cadet branch of the O'Neill Dynasty of Tyrone Born: c1430 Died: 1482
Regnal titles
Preceded by Murtagh Roe O'Neill	Lord of Clandeboye; 1468-1482	Succeeded by Niall Mór O'Neill
