= Phelim Bacagh O'Neill =

15th century lord of Clandeboye

Phelim Bacagh O'Neill (Irish: Feidhlimidh Bacach Ó Néill) was a lord of Clandeboye in 15th-century medieval Ireland. A son of Niall Mór O'Neill, he succeeded his brother Brian Ballagh II to the lordship after his death in 1529. He reigned until his own death in 1533, after which he was succeeded by his brother Niall Oge O'Neill. O'Neill had at least three sons one of whom was Brian McPhelim O'Neill who would become lord of Lower Clandeboye. Another was Hugh, whose son Hugh Óg McHugh O'Neill would become lord of a quarter of Lower Clandeboye. O'Neill was the ancestor of the Lords O'Neill of Shane's Castle. O'Neill's nickname bacach meant "the lame".

Phelim Bacagh O'Neill Clandeboye O'Neill Cadet branch of the O'Neill Dynasty of Tyrone Died: 1533
Regnal titles
Preceded by Brian Ballagh II O'Neill	Lord of Clandeboye; 1529-1533	Succeeded by Niall Oge O'Neill
