= Castlereagh (County Down townland) =

Former hamlet in County Down, Northern Ireland

Coordinates: 54.569415°N 5.874145°W

Castlereagh (from Irish An Caisleán Riabhach, meaning 'the grey castle') is a townland and former hamlet in the civil parish of Knockbreda, barony of Castlereagh Lower, in County Down, Northern Ireland. It is southeast of Belfast and now at the fringe of the city's suburbs. The townland has an area of 415 acres (168 ha).

== History ==
About 1350, at the site of a ráth in the Castlereagh Hills, Aodh Flann O’Neill is said to have built the castle from which the townland was named. Aodh was of the Clandeboye, a branch of the O'Neill dynasty who colonised the area from the west. Con MacShane O'Neill raided Belfast from the castle after Christmas 1602, leading to retributions from the Elizabethan settlers there. In 1615, he was reduced to selling the manor comprising the castle and grounds to Moyses Hill, ancestor of the Marquesses of Downshire, who still exercised jurisdiction there in the 1840s. The castle was ruined by the 1750s.

Castlereagh Presbyterian Church was founded in 1650, with a building on Church Road from 1720, and the present one built in 1835.

The title of Viscount Castlereagh was created in 1795 for Robert Stewart, Baron Londonderry; when he was promoted to Earl of Londonderry in 1796, "Viscount Castlereagh" was the courtesy title of his son, infamous for suppressing the Irish Rebellion of 1798.

=== Population ===
Population of townlands was published at censuses from 1841 to 1926.

Year	1841	1851	1861	1871	1881	1891	1901	1911	1926
Population	217	177	208	164	135	129	128	165	212

== Places named after the townland ==
The manor of Castlereagh gave its name to the barony of Castlereagh, later split into Castlereagh Upper and Castlereagh Lower.

Under the Irish Poor Laws, Castlereagh townland gave its name to the surrounding Castlereagh electoral division within the Belfast poor law union. After the Local Government (Ireland) Act 1898, the County Down portion of the union became the Belfast No. 2 rural district, later renamed Castlereagh rural district; the poor law electoral division became a district electoral division (DED). The Local Government (Boundaries) Act (Northern Ireland) 1971 specified Castlereagh DED as the nucleus of one of the 26 new local government districts, which thus was named Castlereagh district; it became Castlereagh borough in 1977 upon acquiring borough status.
