= O'Neill baronets =

Baronetcy in the Baronetage of Ireland

There have been three baronetcies created for persons with the surname O'Neill, two in the Baronetage of Ireland and one in the Baronetage of the United Kingdom.

The O'Neill Baronetcy, of Upper Claneboys, was created in the Baronetage of Ireland on 13 November 1643 for Brian O'Neill, in consideration of the loyalty and courage he had shown at the Battle of Edgehill. His son, the second Sir Brian, was a High Court judge under James II, one of the very few Roman Catholics to serve on the Irish Bench before the nineteenth century. The title became dormant on the death of the seventh Baronet in 1799.

The O'Neill Baronetcy, of Killeleagh in the County of Antrim, was created in the Baronetage of Ireland on 23 February 1666 for Henry O'Neill. The title was forfeited in 1691.

The (Chichester) O'Neill Baronetcy, of Cleggan in the County of Antrim, was created in the Baronetage of the United Kingdom on 17 June 1929. For more information on this creation, see the Baron Rathcavan.

== O'Neill baronets, of Upper Claneboys (1643) ==
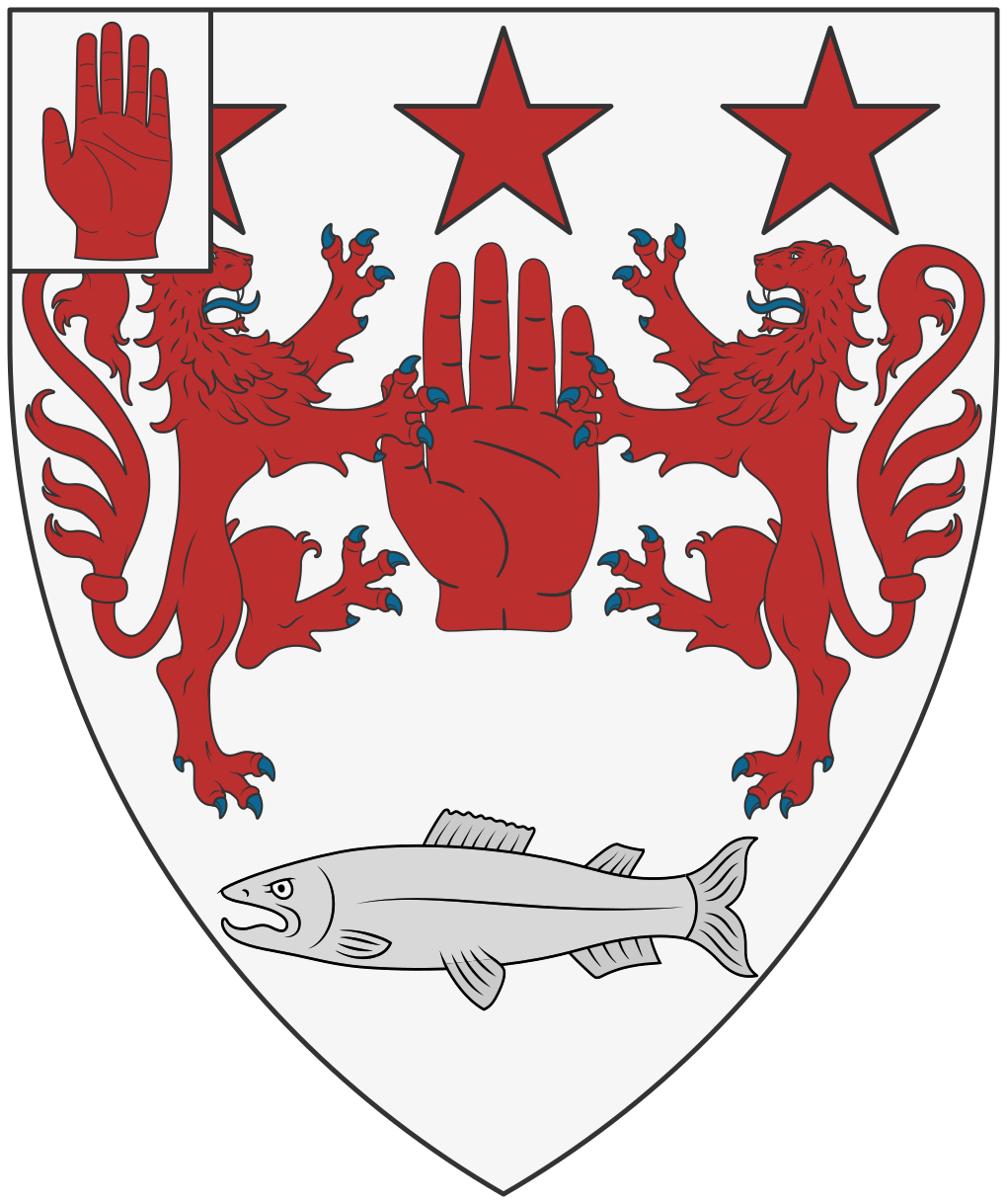
The coat of arms of the O'Neill of Upper Claneboys, Baronets.

- Sir Brian O'Neill, 1st Baronet (died 1670)
- Sir Brian O'Neill, 2nd Baronet (died 1694)
- Sir Henry O'Neill, 3rd Baronet (c. 1674–1759)
- Sir Brian O'Neill, 4th Baronet (died c. 1765)
- Sir Randall O'Neill, 5th Baronet (died 1779)
- Sir William O'Neill, 6th Baronet (c. 1754–1784)
- Sir Francis O'Neill, 7th Baronet (c. 1730–1799)

== O'Neill baronets, of Killeleagh (1666) ==
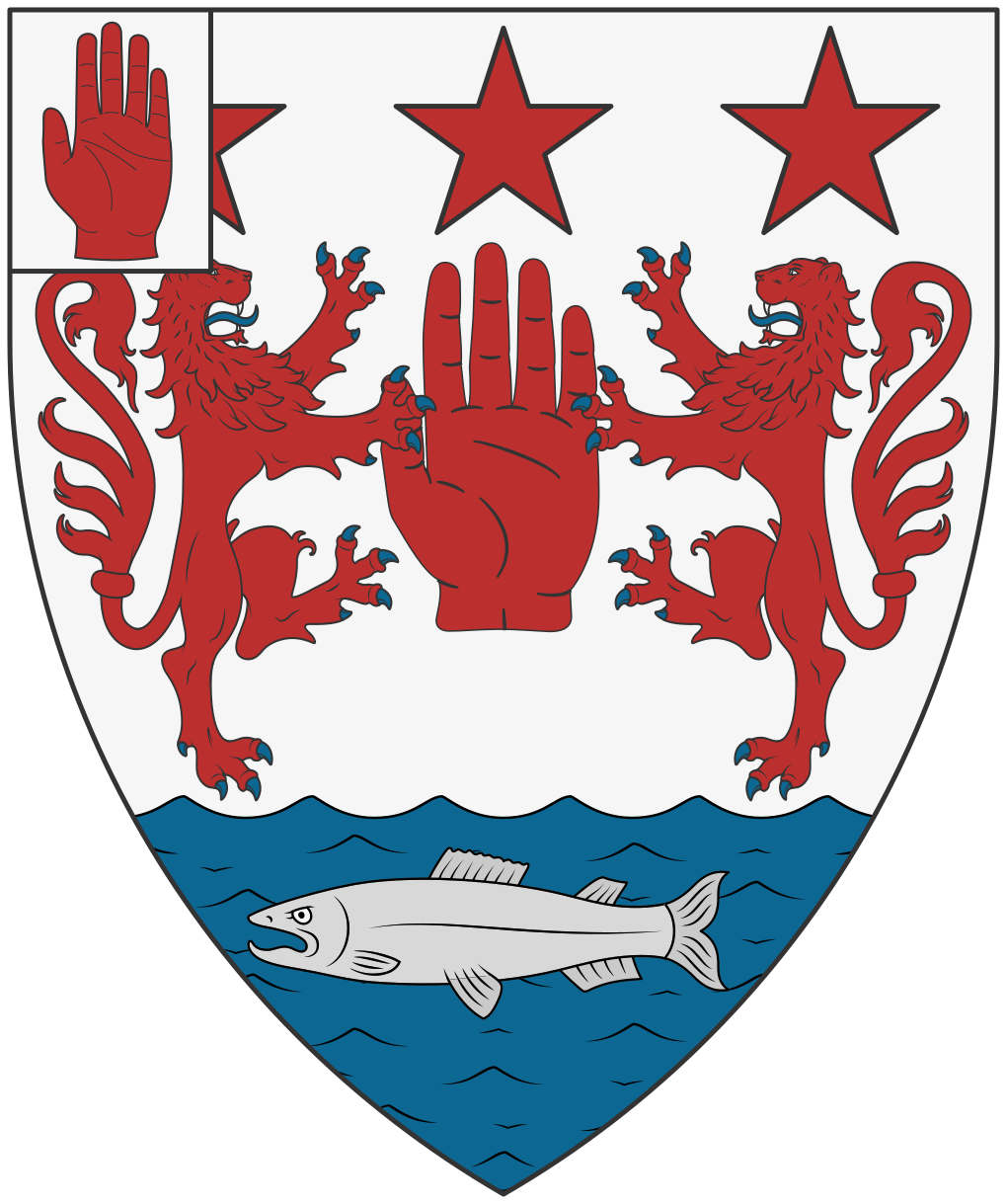
The coat of arms of the O'Neill of Killeleagh, Baronets.

- Sir Henry O'Neill, 1st Baronet (1625-c. 1680)
- Sir Neil O'Neill, 2nd Baronet (c. 1658–1690)
- Sir Daniel O'Neill, 3rd Baronet (forfeited 1691)
