= Hugh Oge O'Neill =

Hugh Oge O'Neill (died 1586), known fully as Hugh Oge McHugh O'Neill, was the son of Hugh O'Neill of the Clandeboye O'Neill's of eastern Ulster, Gaelic Ireland.

== Lord of Edenduffcarrick ==
In 1574, Hugh's paternal uncle, Sir Brian McPhelim O'Neill, lord of Lower Clandeboy, was executed for treason. Afterwards, Hugh's relation, Neill McBrian Fertagh O'Neill, was appointed lord of Clandeboye on behalf of the Crown by The 1st Earl of Essex, later Earl Marshal of Ireland.

This appointment caused internal strife amongst the rival claimants of the Clandeboye O'Neill's. As a result, in 1584, Sir John Perrot, Lord Deputy of Ireland, divided the Clandeboye estate into three. Hugh was granted one quarter of the northern Clandeboye estate centered on Edenduffcarrick in modern-day south-western County Antrim, Northern Ireland. His possession of the castle there, also known as Edendougher, was confirmed by Sir Thomas Norris in an arbitration with Hugh's first cousin Shane MacBrian O'Neill.

== Death ==
Despite this arrangement, internal disputes continued especially between Hugh and Shane McBrian, who was granted the other three-quarters of the northern Clandeboye estate in 1584. This resulted in the murder of Hugh in 1586 after which his grant was given to his brother, Neill McHugh O'Neill.
