= John Michael Wright =

English painter (1617–1694)

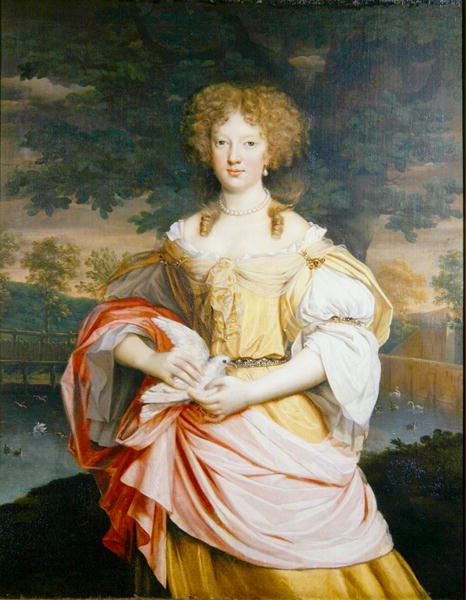
Portrait of Mary Wilbraham, Weston Park

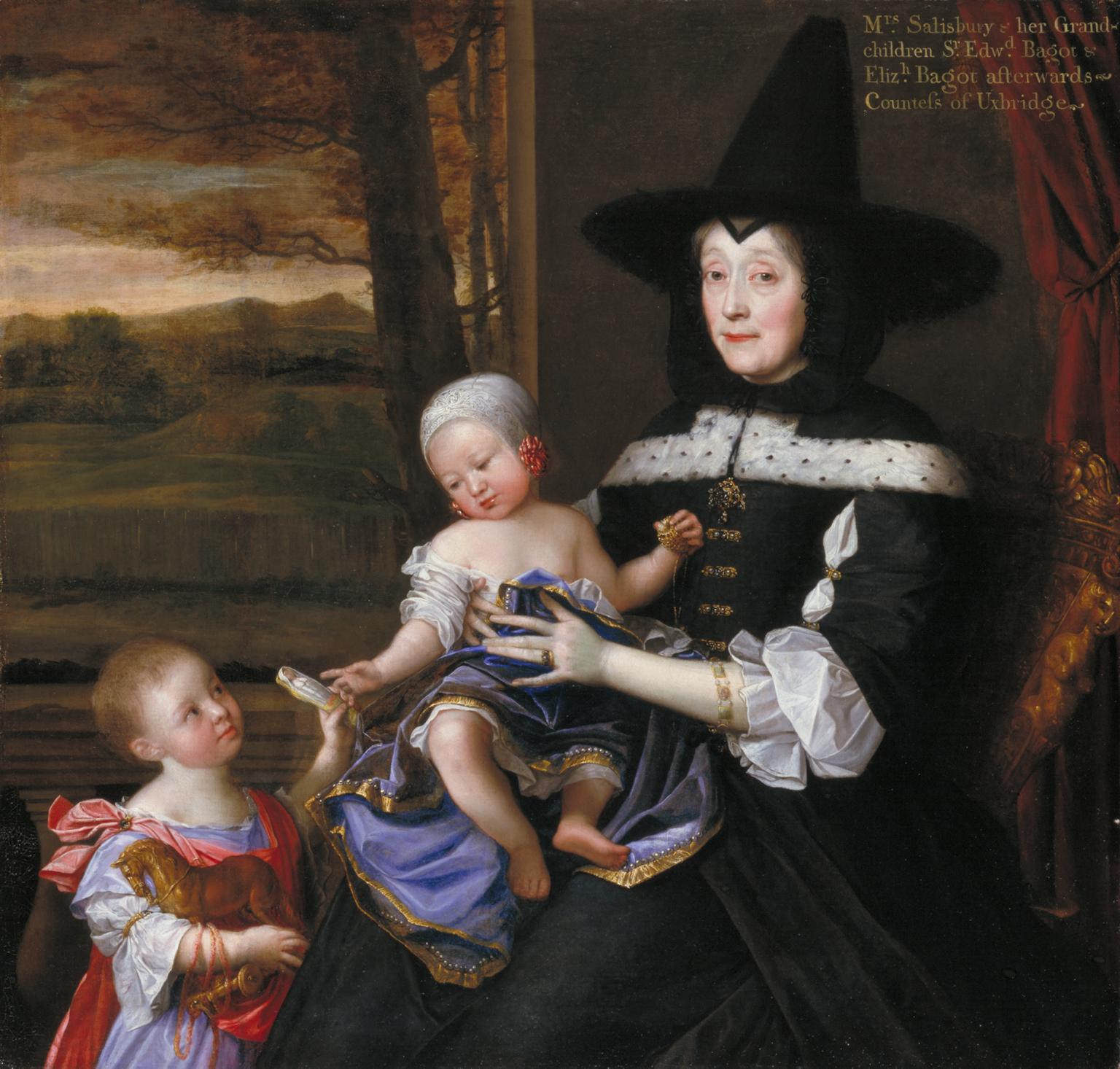
Mrs Salesbury with her Grandchildren Edward and Elizabeth Bagot (c. 1676), Tate Collection

John Michael Wright (May 1617 – July 1694) was an English painter, mainly of portraits in the Baroque style. Born and raised in London, Wright trained in Edinburgh under the Scots painter George Jamesone, and sometimes described himself as Scottish in documents. He acquired a considerable reputation as an artist and scholar during a long sojourn in Rome. There he was admitted to the Accademia di San Luca and was associated with some of the leading artists of his generation. He was engaged by Archduke Leopold Wilhelm of Austria, the governor of the Spanish Netherlands, to acquire artworks in Oliver Cromwell's England in 1655.

He took up permanent residence in England from 1656 and served as court painter before and after the English Restoration. A convert to Roman Catholicism, he was a favourite of the restored Stuart court, a client of both Charles II and James II, and was a witness to many of the political manoeuvrings of the era. In the final years of the Stuart monarchy he returned to Rome as part of an embassy to Pope Innocent XI.

After a period of critical neglect, Wright is now rated as one of the leading indigenous British painters of his generation, largely for the distinctive realism in his portraiture. Perhaps due to the unusually cosmopolitan nature of his experience, he was favoured by patrons at the highest level of society in an age in which foreign artists were usually preferred. Wright's paintings of royalty and aristocracy are included amongst the collections of many leading galleries today.

== Early years and Scottish connections ==
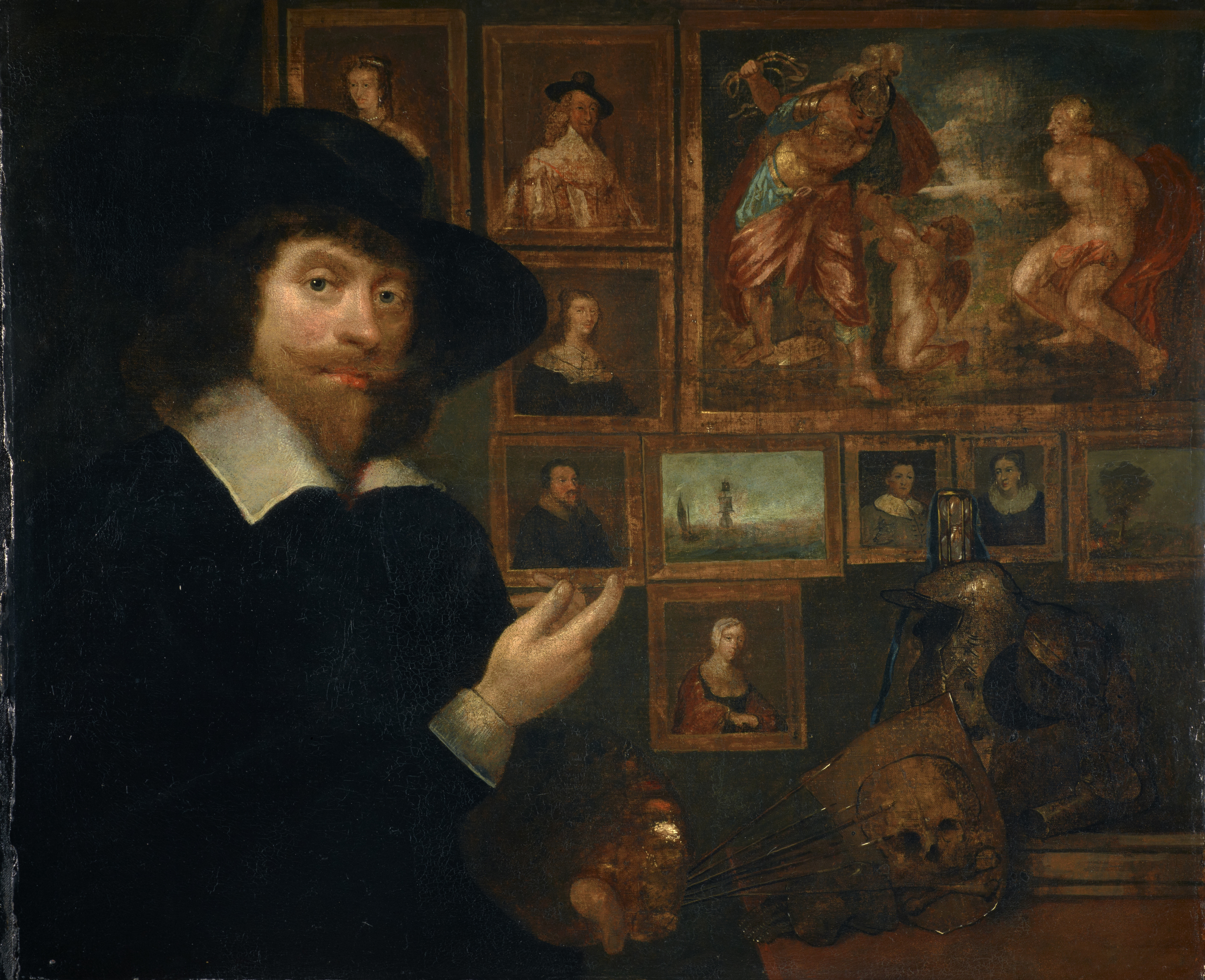
George Jamesone (1590–1644) self-portrait (c. 1642), National Galleries of Scotland.

John Michael Wright, who at the height of his career would interchangeably sign himself "Anglus" or "Scotus", is of uncertain origin. The diarist John Evelyn called him a Scotsman, an epithet repeated by Horace Walpole and tentatively accepted by his later biographer, Verne. However, writing in 1700, the English antiquarian Thomas Hearne claims Wright was born in Shoe Lane, London and, after an adolescent conversion to Roman Catholicism, was taken to Scotland by a priest. A London birth certainly seems supported by a baptismal record, dated 25 May 1617, for a "Mighell Wryghtt", son of James Wright, described as a tailor and a citizen of London, in St Bride's Church, Fleet Street, London.

What is known is that, on 6 April 1636, the 19-year-old Wright was apprenticed to George Jamesone, an Edinburgh portrait painter of some repute. The Edinburgh Register of Apprentices records him as "Michaell, son to James W(right), tailor, citizen of London". The reasons for this move to Scotland are unclear, but may have to do with familial connections (his parents may have been London Scots) or the advent of plague in London. During his apprenticeship, Wright is likely to have lodged at the High Street tenement near the Netherbow Gate that served as Jameson's workplace. The apprenticeship was contracted for five years, but may have been curtailed by Jameson's imprisonment in late 1639. There is no record of any independent work by Wright from this period (his earliest known painting being a small portrait of Robert Bruce, 1st Earl of Ailesbury, painted in the early 1640s during his time in Rome).

It is also possible that Wright met his wife during his Scottish residency. Nothing is known of her, except from a statement of thirty years later which describes her as "related to the most noble and distinguished families of Scotland." If this is accurate, it may explain how Wright was later able to find aristocratic patronage. All that is known for certain is that Wright had at least one child by her, a son, Thomas.

== Rome and the Netherlands ==
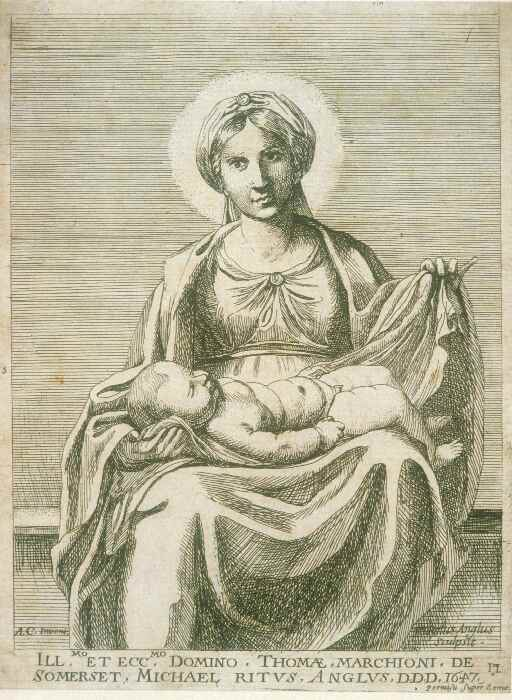
"The Virgin and Child" (1647) after Annibale Carracci. Wright's earliest known Scottish work, dedicated to the Marquess of Somerfield. Hunterian Collection

There is evidence to suggest that Wright went to France following his apprenticeship, however his eventual destination was Italy. It is possible that he arrived in Rome as early as 1642 in the entourage of James Alban Gibbes (a scholar of English descent), but he was certainly resident there from 1647. Although details of his time there are sketchy, his skills and reputation increased so much so that by 1648 he had become a member of the prestigious Accademia di San Luca (where he is recorded as "Michele Rita, pittore inglese"). At that time, the Accademia included numbers of established Italian painters as well as illustrious foreigners including the French Nicolas Poussin and Spaniard Diego Velázquez. On 10 February that year he was elected to the Congregazione dei Virtuosi al Pantheon, a charitable body promoting the Roman Catholic faith through art, which hosted an annual exhibition in the Pantheon.

Wright was to spend more than ten years in Rome. During that time he became an accomplished linguist as well as an established art connoisseur. He also became prosperous enough to build up a substantial collection of books, prints, paintings, gems and medals, including works attributed to Mantegna, Michelangelo, Raphael, Titian and Correggio. He acquired some forty paintings – perhaps as much through dealing as collecting. Richard Symonds, the amateur painter and royalist, catalogued Wright's collection in the early 1650s (and designated him as "Scotus").

=== Antiquarian for Leopold of Austria ===
In 1654, after a decade in Rome, Wright travelled to Brussels where his abilities were recognised by Archduke Leopold Wilhelm of Austria then governor of the Spanish Netherlands. Leopold employed him not as an artist, but as an advisor on antiquities. As the younger brother of the Emperor Ferdinand III and cousin of Philip IV of Spain, the Archduke had the wherewithal to amass a large collection of paintings and antiquities. Moreover, in the spring of 1655, the Archduke was enjoying a period of cordial relations with Oliver Cromwell, then Lord Protector of England. (indeed, the two had been exchanging gifts of horses, and Leopold had provided Cromwell with choice tapestries and other artefacts for the refurbishment of the Palace of Whitehall. Cromwell also received an embassy from the Habsburgs congratulating him on his new office.)

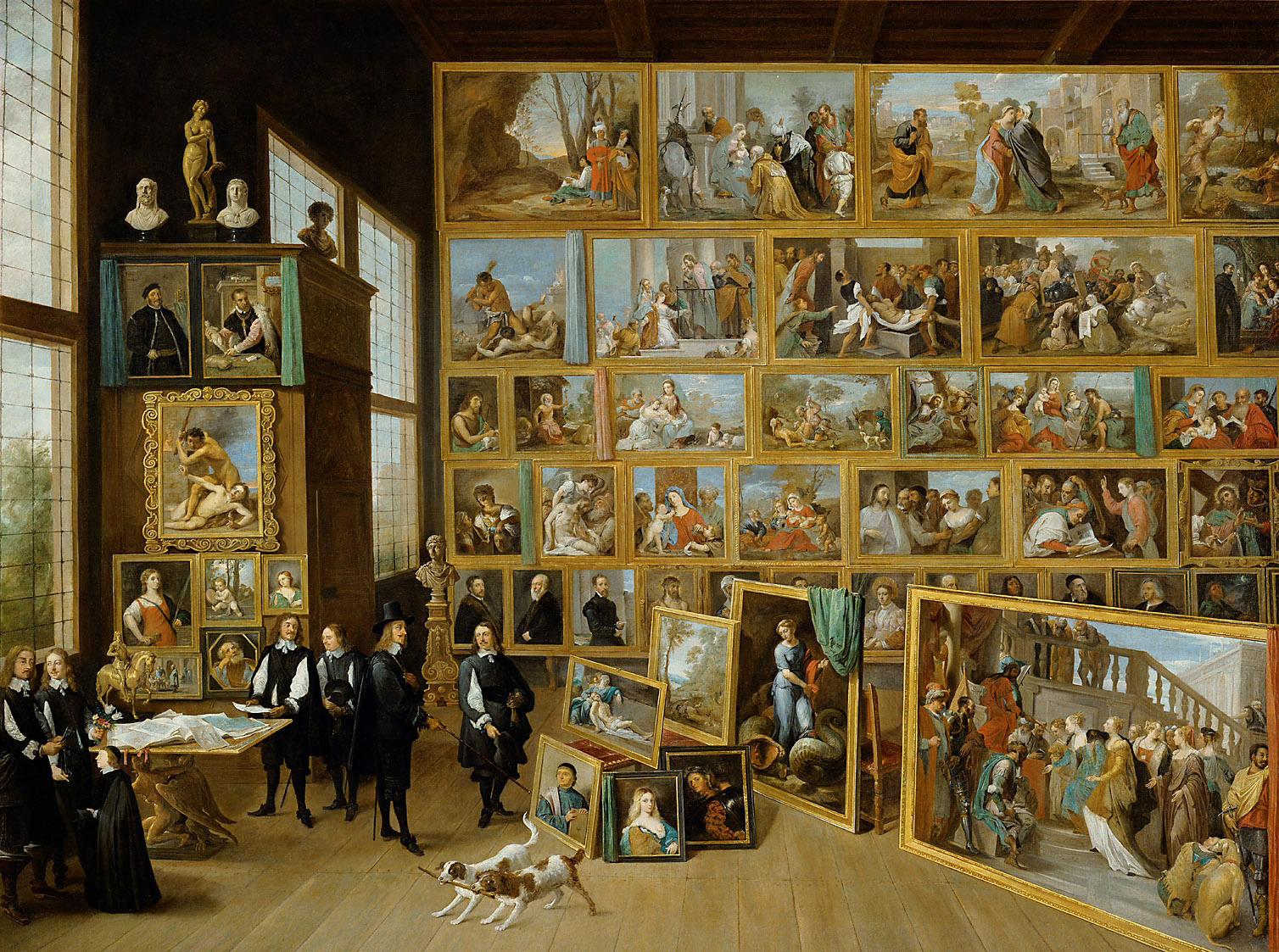
Archduke Leopold's Gallery in Brussels, for which Wright collected (painting by David Teniers the Younger c. 1650).

Since the execution of Charles I in 1649, Leopold had been purchasing artworks from the royal collections and those of various aristocrats, and, against this background, commissioned Wright to travel to London and acquire further specimens. A passport was issued to him as "'Juan Miguel Rita, pintor Ingles, qua va a Inglaterra a procurar pinturas, medalas, antiguedades, y otras costa señaladas, que le hemosencargado..." to allow him to travel to England. The passport is dated 22 May 1655, and signed by the Archduke at Brussels, indicating that Wright had left Italy for Flanders by this time.

As one on an official mission, Wright would probably have offered greetings to Leopold's ambassador extraordinary in London, the Marqués de Lede, and to Alonso de Cárdenas, the regular Habsburg ambassador, who had also been engaged since 1649 in art procurement for the Spanish Monarch. The lack of records means that the timing and duration of this visit remain uncertain. However, de Lede left in late June, and de Cárdenas a few weeks later – as relations between Cromwell and the Habsburgs deteriorated – so Wright probably arrived back in Flanders, with any acquisitions he had made, just in time to learn of the Archduke's impending departure – and that of his huge art collection – from Brussels in the autumn of 1655.

However, after the relocation of his patron to Vienna, Wright again visited London. On 9 April 1656 he passed through Dover, and the register of visitors indicates:

Michael Wright Englishman landed at Dover the 9th present out of the Pacquet boat from Dunkerque and came to London on the 12th and lodgeth at the house of Mrs Johnston in Weldstreet in the parish of Gyles in the fields in Middlesex and saith that having exercised the Art of Picture drawing in France & Italy & other parts the greatest part of his life, he intendeth shortly to returne to Italy where he left his family

Perhaps tactfully, the record glosses Wright's employment in Flanders, (euphemistically referred to as "other parts") as England and the Habsburgs were now at open war, and it fails to mention his membership of the Accademia di San Luca, which would have identified him as a Roman Catholic.

== England ==
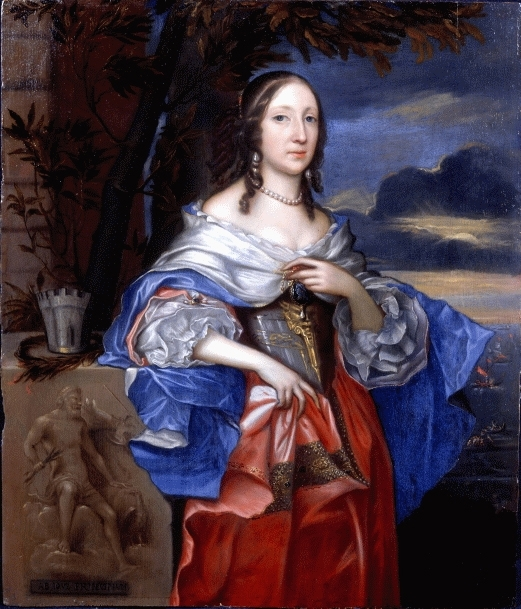
Elizabeth Claypole (1658), National Portrait Gallery

Whatever his intentions, Wright did not return to Italy, rather he was joined in England by his family soon after. Despite his Roman Catholicism and the strong Protestantism of the Protectorate (1653–1659), Wright seems to have been able to find prestigious work. Indeed, Waterhouse speaks of him engaging in "the most deliberate and unblushing toadying to Cromwell" in his 1658 painting of a small posthumous portrait of Elizabeth Claypole, Oliver Cromwell's daughter (now in the National Portrait Gallery). This is an allegorical portrait depicting Elizabeth as Minerva, leaning on a carved relief representing the goddess springing from the head of Jove with the motto "Ab Jove Principium" – an allusion to Cromwell himself, whose cameo portrait she holds. Seemingly, he was also willing to work the other side of the political divide: in 1659 he painted Colonel John Russell who was a player in the "Sealed Knot" conspiracy to restore Charles II to the throne. That particular portrait is regarded by at least one critic as Wright's "masterpiece".

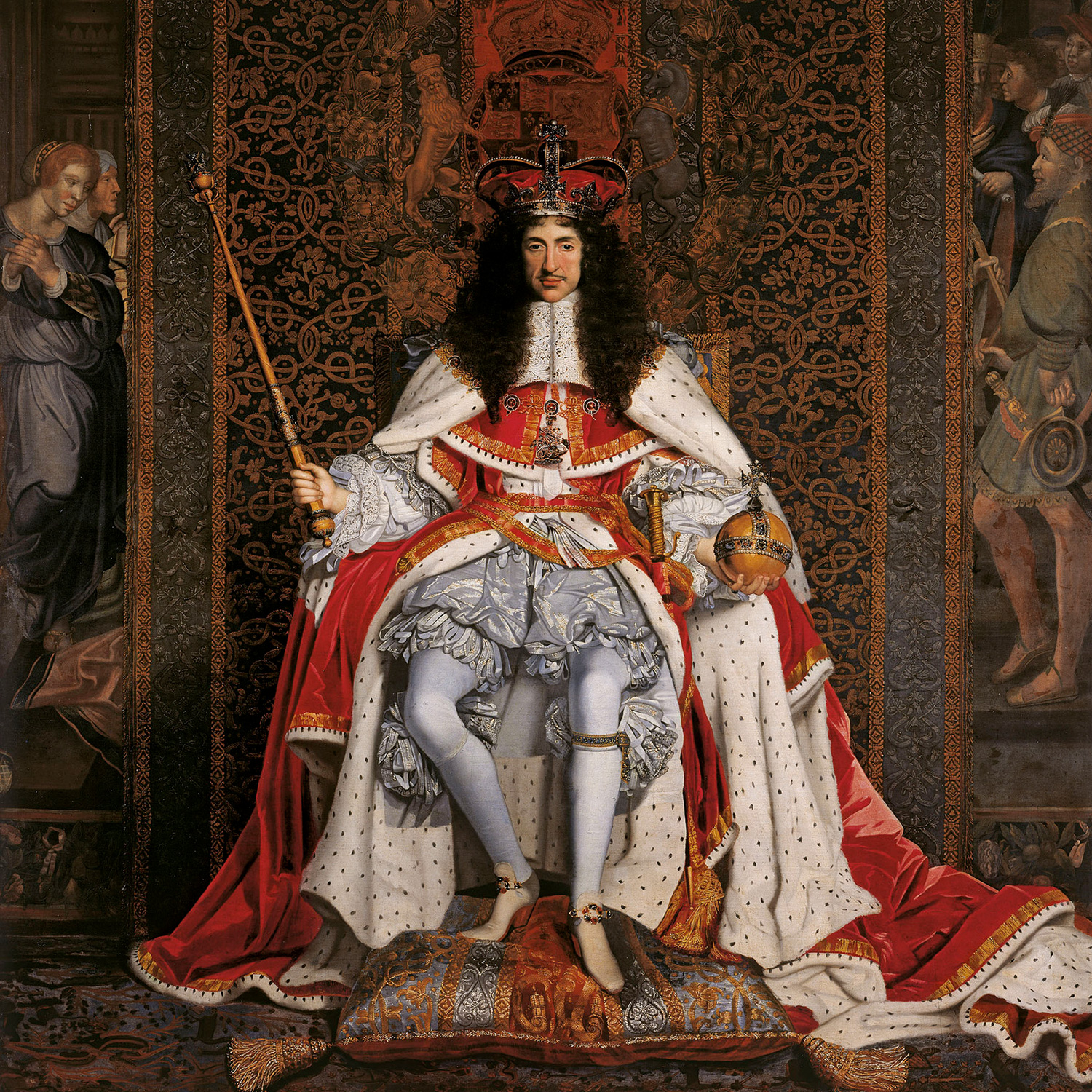
The portrait by Wright of King Charles II, in the Royal Collection

After the restoration of Charles II in 1660, Wright's Roman Catholicism became less of a handicap, due to the King's preference for religious toleration. Never a good businessman, Wright encountered some financial difficulties and King Charles granted him the privilege of disposing of his collection of Old Masters by means of a lottery. The King himself acquired 14 of the paintings. By the early 1660s Wright had established a successful studio in London, and was described by diarist John Evelyn as "the famous painter Mr Write". Later, the Great Plague of London (1665) drove Wright out to countryside, where he painted at least three members of the Catholic family of Arundell of Wardour.

Ironically, in the next year, the Great Fire of London (1666) was to be of benefit to him, when he received one of the City of London's first new artistic commissions to paint twenty-two full length portraits of the so-called 'Fire Judges' (those appointed to assess the property disputes arising from the fire). These paintings, completed in 1670, hung in London's Guildhall until it was bombed during World War II; today only two (those of Sir Matthew Hale and Sir Hugh Wyndham) remain in the Guildhall Art Gallery the remainder having been destroyed or dispersed.

=== Royal patronage ===
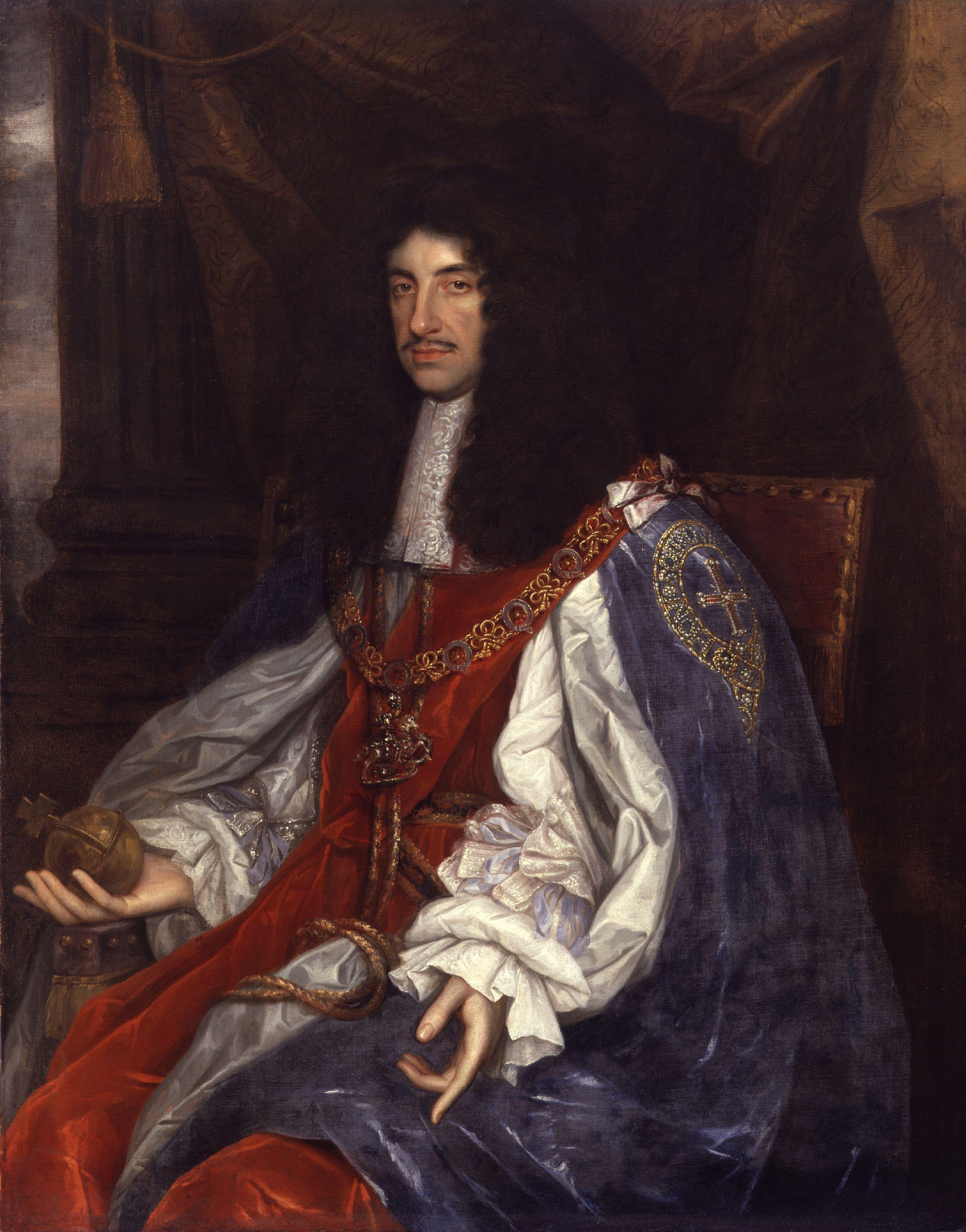
King Charles II

Charles II, who promoted a number of Roman Catholics at court, granted Wright a measure of royal art patronage. In 1661, soon after the coronation, he painted a spectacular, formalised portrait of the monarch, seated in front of a tapestry representing the Judgement of Solomon, wearing St. Edward's Crown, the robes of the Garter, and carrying the orb and sceptre. Wright was also commissioned to paint an allegorical ceiling for the King's bedchamber at Whitehall Palace, and he was further appointed in 1673 to the office of "picture drawer in ordinary", allowing him to exercise his right to sign his pictures "Pictor Regis". However, to his disappointment, he did not receive the coveted office of King's Painter, which was held in the 1660s by Sir Peter Lely alone. In contrast to Wright's sympathetic realism, and carefully observed landscape backgrounds, Lely had a more glamorous style, favoured by the court, and based on Van Dyck's pre-Civil War style. This prompted the diarist Samuel Pepys to remark, after an enjoyable visit to Lely's studio, "thence to Wright's the painters: but Lord, the difference that is between their two works".

Unlike Lely, who was knighted, Wright never received significant recognition from King Charles. However, at least one admirer thought he did deserve it. In 1669, Wright and the miniaturist Samuel Cooper had met Cosimo III de' Medici, Grand Duke of Tuscany. Cosimo later called at Wright's studio where he commissioned a portrait of the Duke of Albemarle from Wright. On 3 March 1673, perhaps some time after Wright had painted his state picture of Charles II (now in the Royal Collection), a strange letter was sent from an obscure "Mairie Lady Hermistan" (evidently a fellow Roman Catholic) to Cosimo, asking him to intercede with the King to grant Wright a baronetcy. However, nothing came of the request.

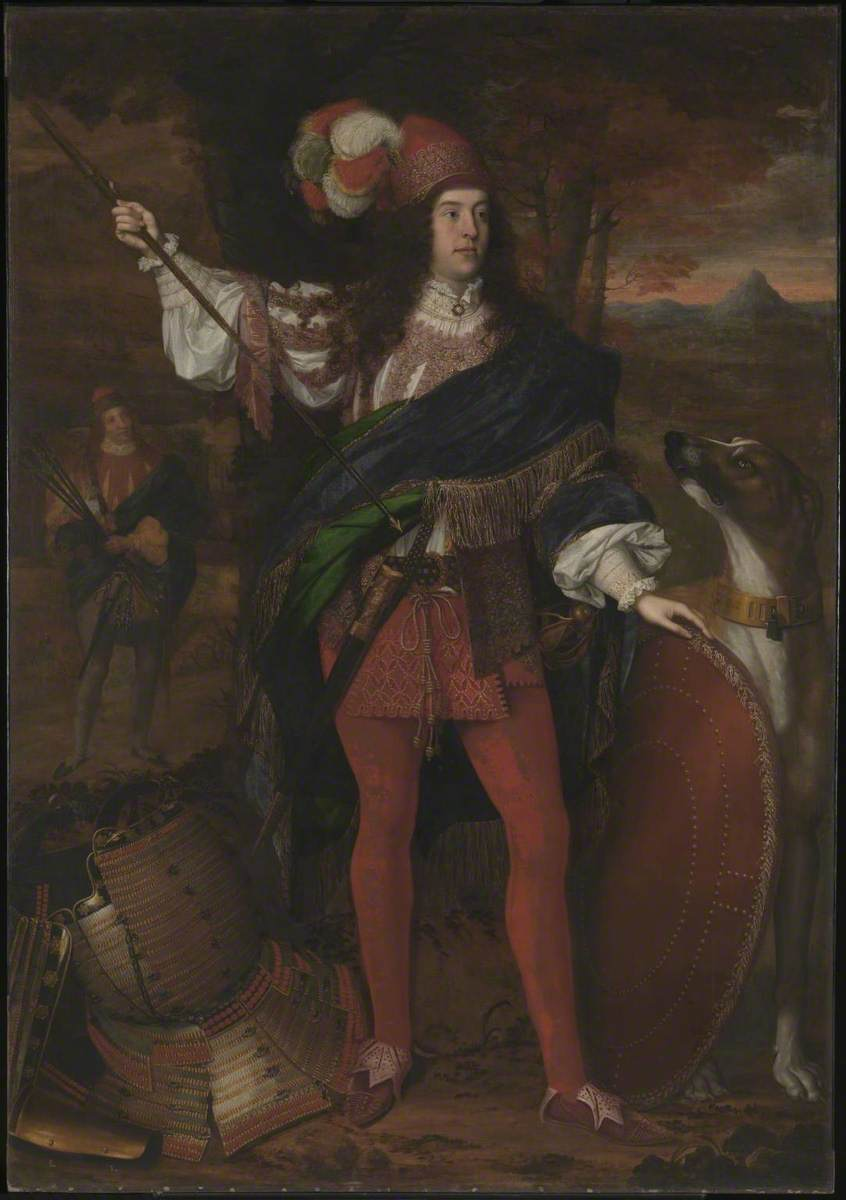
Sir Neil O'Neil (1680), Tate Collection

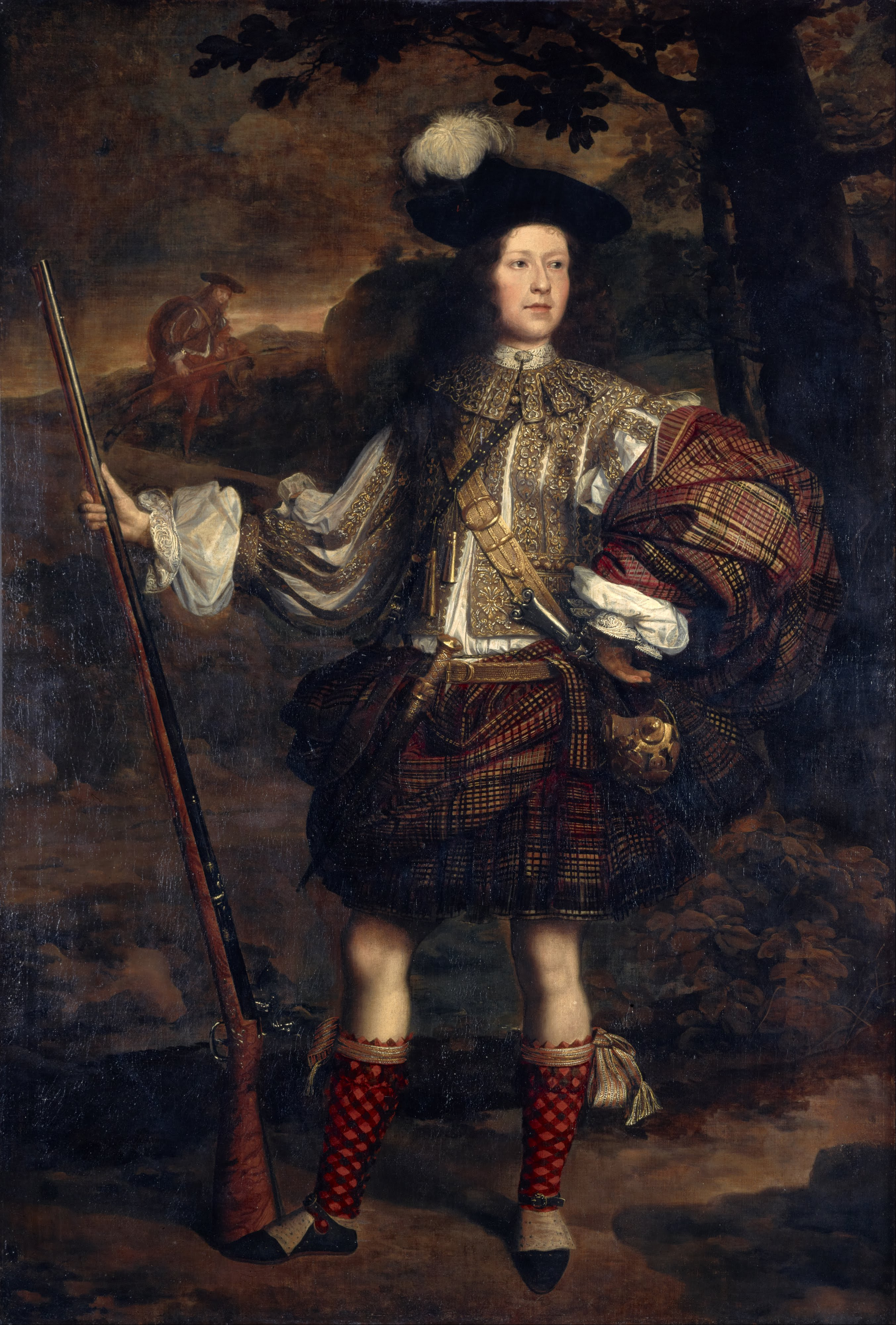
Lord Mungo Murray (c. 1683), Scottish National Portrait Gallery

As antipathy towards Catholics intensified in London from the late 1670s, Wright spent more time working away from court. He painted six family portraits for Sir Walter Bagot of Blithfield in Staffordshire in 1676/7. In 1678, he removed to Dublin for a number of years, perhaps due to the anti-Catholic hysteria generated by Titus Oates's Popish Plot. Here, still styling himself "Pictor Regis", he painted "The Ladies Catherine and Charlotte Talbot", which is today in the National Gallery of Ireland. He also painted two full-lengths portraits of costumed chieftains, the "Sir Neil O'Neill" (c. 1680), now in the Tate Collection, and the "Lord Mungo Murray" (c. 1683), now in the Scottish National Portrait Gallery. Sir Neil O'Neill was a fellow Roman Catholic, also in exile in Dublin. Wright portrayed him in the dress costume of an Irish chieftain, with suit of rare Japanese armour at his feet. The significance of this armour is that it is thought to be a coded symbol of a triumph over the persecutors of Roman Catholicism, of whom, at that time, the Japanese were notorious. The portrait of Mungo Murray (the 5th son of the Royalist Marquis of Atholl) is notable for being considered one of the first instances of Scottish tartan being portrayed in a portrait.

=== Roman embassy ===
In 1685, when the openly Roman Catholic James II ascended the throne, Wright was able to return to royal service. However, significantly, James did not employ Wright as an artist, but gave him the "time consuming and futile post" of steward on a diplomatic embassy. He was appointed as steward to Roger Palmer, 1st Earl of Castlemaine husband of Barbara Villiers, the late King's mistress. Wright's knowledge of Rome and of the Italian language may have played a part in this, as Castlemaine was dispatched, in 1686, on an embassy to Pope Innocent XI to demonstrate that England could become a player on the Roman Catholic side in impending European conflicts. Wright's role in the embassy was to oversee the production of elaborate coaches, costumes and decorations for the procession, which secured a papal audience in January 1687. He also arranged a stupendous banquet for a thousand guests in the Palazzo Doria Pamphilj, complete with sugar sculptures and a large state portrait of James II. While in Rome, Wright published an illustrated Italian account of the embassy, dedicated to the Duchess of Modena and, on his return, an English version was published in October 1687, dedicated to her daughter Queen Mary.

=== Final years ===
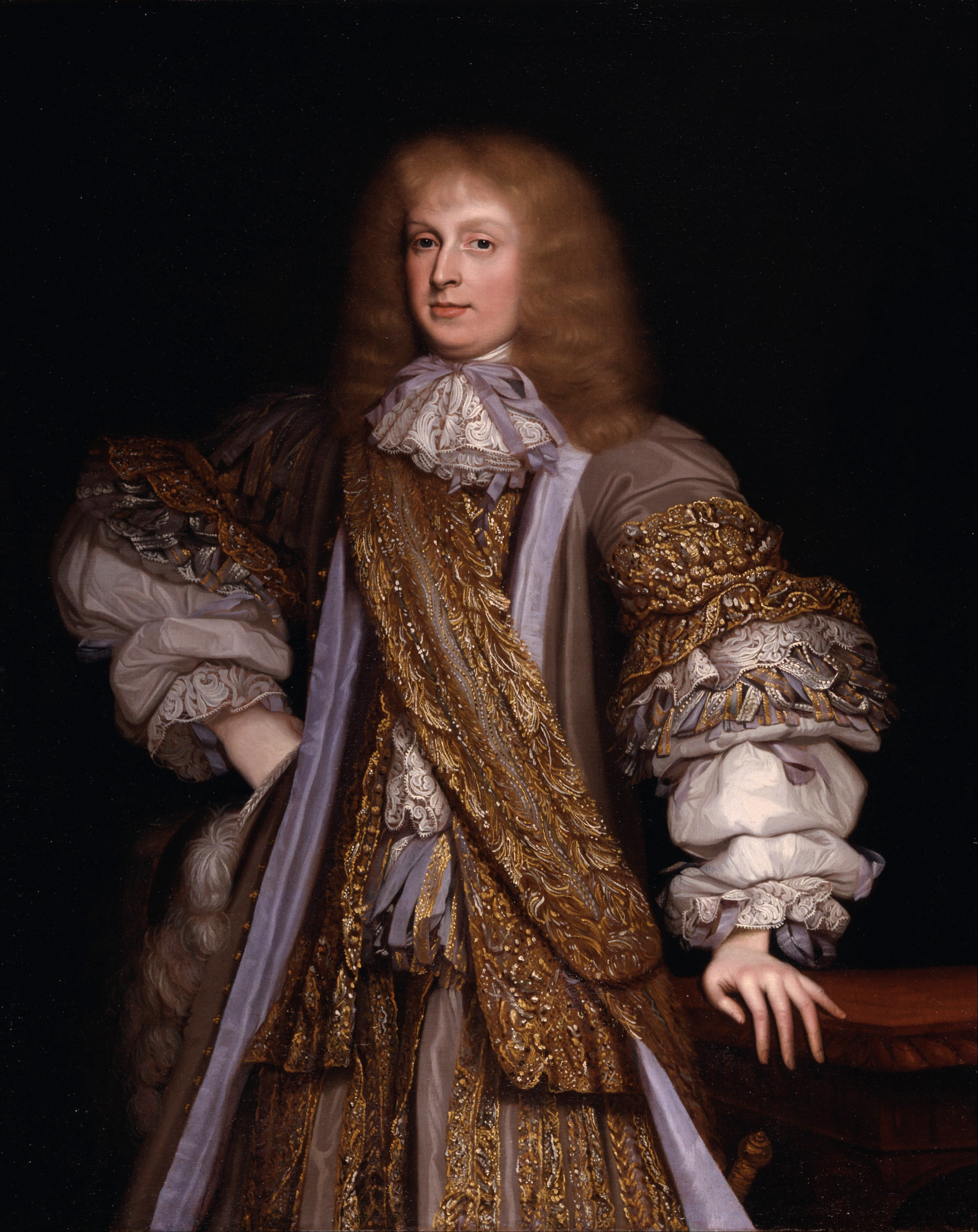
Sir John Corbet of Adderley(c.1676), Yale Center for British Art

Wright's career came to an end in 1688 with the expulsion of King James II during the Glorious Revolution. He seems to have accepted the inevitable end of his royal favour with the accession to the throne of the Protestant William of Orange. He lived on, in relative poverty, for a further six years until 1694. In March of that year, he made a will leaving his house in St Paul's parish to his niece Katherine Vaux. His collection of drawings, prints and books were left to his nephew, the painter Michael Wright; however a codicil to the will stated that the books were to be sold on behalf of his son Thomas, who was then abroad. The books were auctioned on 4 June and on 1 August 1694, John Michael Wright was buried at St Martin-in-the-Fields.

== Artistic legacy ==
Much of the scholarly appreciation of Wright's work is fairly recent. In 1982, an exhibition of his work: ‘John Michael Wright – The King’s Painter’ – in the Scottish National Portrait Gallery – led to a renewed interest in his contributions, and the catalogue (edited by Sara Stevenson and Duncan Thomson) re-wrote and uncovered much of the known biographical details. New works continue to be discovered and previously known ones re-attributed to him. Wright is now viewed as amongst the most successful of seventeenth-century Britain's indigenous artists, and is rated alongside contemporaries such as Robert Walker and William Dobson, who were both dead before Wright's career reached its peak.

One modern exhibition catalogue described him as "the finest seventeenth century British-born painter", though the same has been said, perhaps more often, of Dobson. Certainly, he was one of the few who painted the elite aristocracy of his day, and was responsible for some of the most magnificent English royal portraiture surviving. This achievement is particularly significant in an age where British patrons had tended to favour foreign artists like Holbein and Van Dyck, and would continue to favour immigrants such as Lely and Kneller. Indeed, part of the reason for Wright's success is recognised as being his unusually cosmopolitan training: no prior British artist had so much exposure to European influence. During his Italian sojourn, and his participation in the Accademia di San Luca, not only had Wright collected works attributed to continental giants like Michelangelo, Raphael and Titian, he had also been influenced by, and even copied, much of their tone and style.

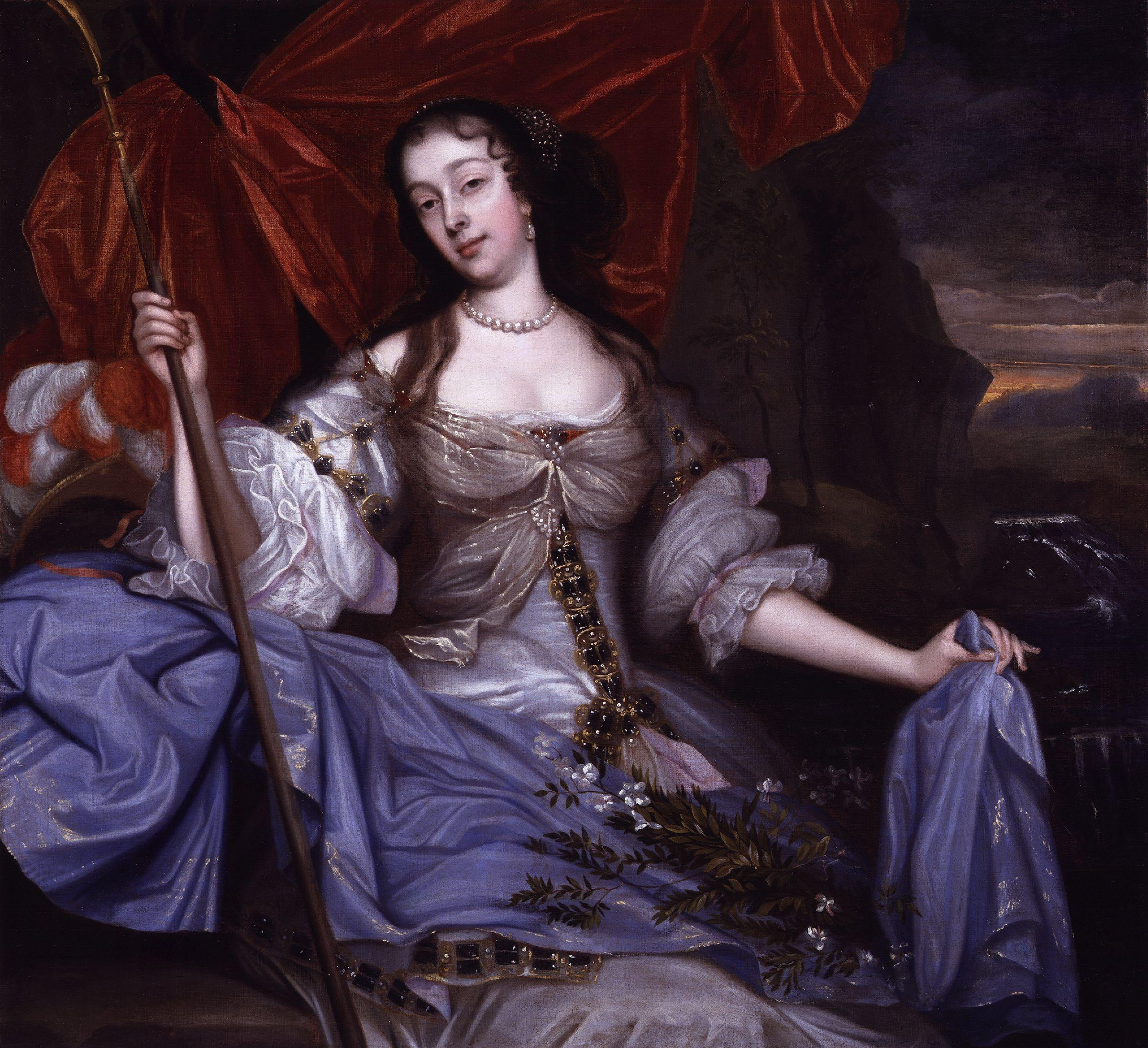
Wright's Duchess of Cleveland (1670), as shepherdess NPG

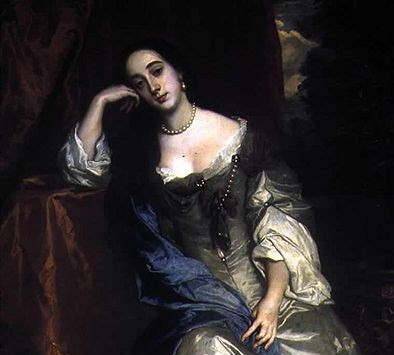
Lely's Duchess of Cleveland (1666) as the penitent Magdalen

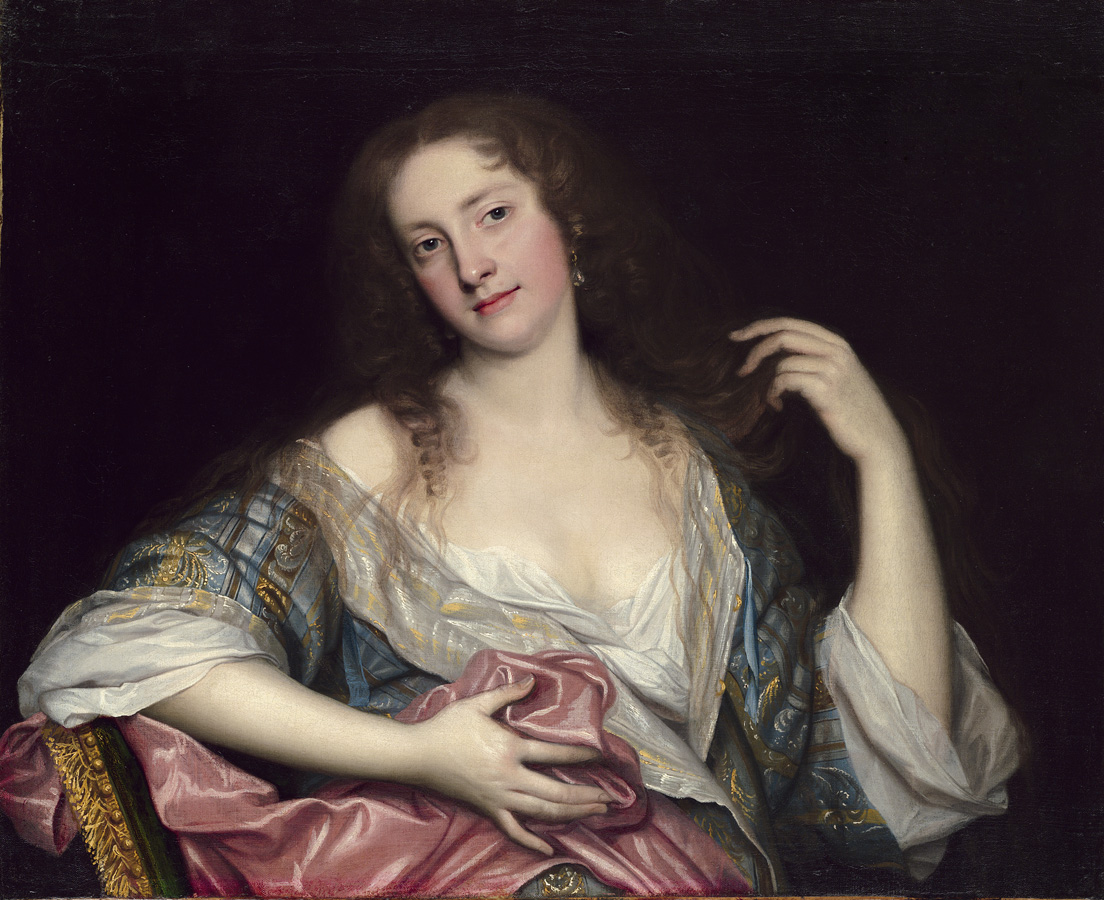
Portrait of a Lady, thought to be Ann Davis, Lady Lee (unknown date), private collection

In his field and day, Wright was certainly eclipsed by his rival the more prolific Lely, to whom he is often compared. One critic, Millar, observes that any comparisons undertaken would "ruthlessly expose Wright's weaknesses and mannerisms" but that positively "they would also demonstrate his remarkable independence, his unfailing integrity and charm, the sources of which must partly lie in his unusual origins, fragmented career and attractive personality". Millar suggests that a particularly useful comparison can be made between Lely and Wright's respective portrayals of the Duchess of Cleveland (Barbara Villiers) (above). Whereas Lely portrayed her as a "full-blown and palpably desirable strumpet", the more seriously minded Wright, who was not really in sympathy with the morality of the new court and its courtesans, rendered a more puppet-like figure.

However, even if Lely was considered the more masterly and fashionable of the two in seventeenth-century Britain, Wright is generally accepted as portraying the more lively and realistic likenesses of his subjects, a fact that reinforces Pepys's observation that Lely's work was "good but not like". Neither should Wright's realism be confused with a prudishness; as can be seen, for example, in his portrait the lady, thought to be Ann Davis (right). The picture, with the sitter's clothing left undone and her modesty barely preserved by a red drape, has been described as exhibiting a fresh – even risky – reality: erotic by contemporary standards. Whereas Wright's contemporaries might have used the ‘disguise’ of presenting the sitter in the guise of a classical goddess to protect against accusation of salaciousness, Wright's portrait rather depends on his realism, notably in his flesh tones, and depth.
