= Sir Brian O'Neill, 2nd Baronet =

Irish judge

Sir Brian O'Neill, 2nd Baronet (died 1694/1697) was an Irish landowner, barrister and judge. He was one of the Roman Catholic judges appointed by King James II of England in his effort to "Romanise" the Irish administration. As such he and his fellow Catholic judges have been treated harshly by historians. However William of Orange, after he overthrew his father-in-law James II, also made use of O'Neill's services for a time. He was the second of the O'Neill Baronets of Upper Claneboys.

== Family ==
His branch of the O'Neill dynasty belonged to the Clanaboye O'Neills, but not much is recorded about them prior to the English Civil War. Brian's father, also named Brian, was the son of Neill Óg O'Neill and Lady Sarah MacDonnell, daughter of Randal MacDonnell, 1st Earl of Antrim and his wife Ellis, daughter of Hugh O'Neill, Earl of Tyrone. The elder Brian fought at the Battle of Edgehill in 1642. The following year he was created a baronet as a reward for the courage and loyalty he displayed in battle. There is conflicting information about his wife who has been variously described as Jane Finch, a cousin of Heneage Finch, 1st Earl of Nottingham, or as Sarah Savage of Portaferry. The main family estate was at Upper Clandeboye in County Down, and they also held lands at Backweston, near Celbridge, County Kildare.

== Early career ==
The younger Brian entered Gray's Inn in 1664, and the King's Inn in 1674. He succeeded to the baronetcy in 1670 (or, according to some sources, in 1680). He married his cousin Mary Plunkett, daughter of Edward Plunkett, and sister of Christopher Plunkett, 10th Baron of Dunsany, and widow of James Wolverston of Stillorgan. Her mother Lady Catherine MacDonnell was a sister of the Marquess of Antrim, who had been a great favourite of Charles I of England and his Queen Henrietta Maria. Catherine's sister Lady Sarah MacDonnell was Bryan's grandmother. These influential family connections were no doubt one of the reasons why he escaped political disgrace after the downfall of James II.

== Judge ==
From 1687 onward a determined effort was made by the English Crown to replace Protestant judges with Catholics. O'Neill was appointed a judge solely on account of his religion: Ball noted that he had only had about fifteen years practice at the Bar. He became a justice of assize in Ulster in 1687 and the following year was appointed justice of the Court of King's Bench (Ireland). He served for barely a year before the Glorious Revolution; but no action seems to have been taken against him after the ruin of James I's cause. He was acting as a judge of assize in 1689 and 1690. He probably died in 1694 (Ball gives the date as 1697) and was buried in his wife's family vault at Dunsany Castle. His son Henry succeeded as 3rd Baronet; he also had a daughter Elinor, who married Edward Evers. The title became dormant in 1799.

== Reputation ==
All of James II's Catholic judges were subjected to much criticism during and especially after their brief careers on the Bench, being accused of a lack of legal knowledge and integrity. In particular the Jacobite writer Thomas Sheridan described them all as creatures of the Lord Deputy of Ireland, Richard Talbot, 1st Earl of Tyrconnell: "poor, indigent and scandalously ignorant of the law". In judging this assessment of O'Neill, allowance must be made for Sheridan's deep hatred of his former employer Tyrconnell, which no doubt extended to those whom Tyrconnell favoured. Elrington Ball by contrast notes that some of these men, including O'Neill, survived the Revolution with their reputations and estates intact, although there were exceptions like Garrett Dillon, the Recorder of Dublin, who died in exile.

Baronetage of Ireland
Preceded by Brian O'Neill	Baronet (of Upper Claneboys); 1670–1694	Succeeded by Henry O'Neill
