= Clandonnell =

Ancient district in County Londonderry, Northern Ireland

Clandonnell (from Irish Clann Domhnaill 'Donal's offspring') is an early-modern Irish district in what is now southern County Londonderry, Northern Ireland. Clandonnell along with the ancient districts of Glenconkeyne, Killetra, and Tomlagh, comprised the former barony of Loughinsholin, with Clandonnell forming the northern part reaching as far south as Maghera.

== History ==
Clandonnell derives its name from the Clann Domhnaill Donn na Banna a branch of the Clandeboye O'Neills. The Clandonnell descended from Donnell Donn, son of Brian, son of Hugh Boy II O'Neill. They ruled the area from the 15th century until the Plantation of Ulster in the 17th century.

The most celebrated descendant of Donnell Donn was his great-grandson Brian Carrach O'Neill who is stated as being the last lord of Loughinsholin. His stronghold was based at the crannog at Inishrush, which is also known as the Green Lough. Despite being lord of Loughinsholin and a minor branch of the O'Neills of Clandeboye, Brian Carrach O'Neill was subject to the O'Cahans of Coleraine and Dungiven.

Brian Carrach O'Neill died in 1586, and in that same year Marshal Bagenal described Brian's territory as "Brian Carraghe's countrey" and as the "fastest grownde of Irelande". The latter statement meant that the area was amongst the most impenetrable parts of Ulster.
