= Ireland in the Middle Ages =

Ireland in the Middle Ages may refer to:

- History of Ireland (400–795), Ireland in the early Middle Ages
- History of Ireland (795–1169), Ireland in the high Middle Ages
- History of Ireland (1169–1536), Ireland in the late Middle Ages

== See also ==
- History of Ireland
- Early Modern Ireland
- Gaelic Ireland
