= List of shipwrecks in December 1877 =

The list of shipwrecks in December 1877 includes ships sunk, foundered, grounded, or otherwise lost during December 1877.

== 1 December ==
List of shipwrecks: 1 December 1877
Ship	State	Description
Crusader	United Kingdom	The full-rigged ship ran aground on the Goodwin Sands, Kent and was wrecked. Her 22 crew were rescued by the North Deal Lifeboat. She was on a voyage from Quebec City, Canada to South Shields, County Durham.
Hazard	Netherlands	The brigantine collided with Carnarvon Castle (United Kingdom) and was abandoned off Start Point, Devon, United Kingdom. All on board were rescued by Carnarvon Castle. Hazard was on a voyage from Mytilene, Greece to Goole, Yorkshire, United Kingdom.
San Chiaco	Italy	The barque was wrecked in the Strait of Malacca. Her crew were rescued.
Utile	Italy	The barque was run into by the steamship America (Germany) and sank in the Atlantic Ocean 500 nautical miles (930 km) west of Cape Clear Island, County Cork, United Kingdom with the loss of four of her fifteen crew. Survivors were rescued by America. Utile was on a voyage from Baltimore, Maryland, United States to Queenstown, County Cork.

== 2 December ==
List of shipwrecks: 2 December 1877
Ship	State	Description
Argo	Germany	The ship was driven ashore at Hjørring, Denmark. Her crew were rescued. She was on a voyage from Hamburg to Fredrikshavn, Denmark.
Champion	United Kingdom	The ketch was wrecked on The Shingles, off the Isle of Wight with the loss of all three crew.
Eunice	United Kingdom	The steamship collided with a Spanish steamship and ran aground off Santander, Spain.
Jacob Lindstrom	Sweden	The barque was run into by Sophia (United Kingdom) in the North Sea off the coast of Essex, United Kingdom. Her eight crew were rescued by the Harwich Lifeboat Springwell ( Royal National Lifeboat Institution). Jacob Lindstrom was on a voyage from Kemi, Grand Duchy of Finland to Libourne, Gironde, France. She was taken in to Harwich, Essex on 6 December and subsequently rebuilt, becoming the British schooner Clacton.

== 3 December ==
List of shipwrecks: 3 December 1877
Ship	State	Description
Eagle	United Kingdom	The ship was wrecked at sea, according to a message in a bottle that washed up on the coast of Fife on 2 June 1878.
Elizabeth	United Kingdom	The smack collided with a foreign schooner and sank off the Nore.
Emulation	United Kingdom	The ship was sighted off Land's End, Cornwall whilst on a voyage from Mount's Bay to Barrow-in-Furness, Lancashire. No further trace, reported missing.
John D. Tupper	United Kingdom	The ship was driven ashore in Loch Indaal. She was on a voyage from Garston, Lancashire to Brazil. She was refloated and taken in to Londonderry for repairs.
Julius	Denmark	The ship was driven ashore on Terschelling, Friesland, Netherlands. Her crew were rescued. she was on a voyage from Umeå, Sweden to Vlaardingen, South Holland, Netherlands.
Lady Havelock	United Kingdom	The brig was driven ashore and sank at Benacre, Suffolk. Her eight crew were rescued by the Kessingland Lifeboat. She was on a voyage from Sunderland, County Durham to Jersey, Channel Islands.
Oasis	United States	The ship collided with the steamship Pennsylvania (United States) and sank off The Skerries, Isle of Anglesey, United Kingdom. Her eighteen crew were rescued. Oasis was on a voyage from Liverpool, Lancashire, United Kingdom to Philadelphia, Pennsylvania. She was refloated on 5 December and towed in to Holyhead, Anglesey.
Olympias	United Kingdom	The steamship was driven ashore on Terschelling. Her crew were rescued. She was on a voyage from Kronstadt, Russia to Gibraltar.
Quintero	Chile	The full-rigged ship collided with the steamship Norseman (United Kingdom) and sank off Cape São Roque, Brazil with the loss of a crew member. Survivors were rescued by Norseman. Quintero was on a voyage from Valparaíso to Boston, Massachusetts, United States.
Sunda	United States	The ship was destroyed by fire in the Atlantic Ocean. Her crew were rescued by Normandy (United Kingdom).

== 4 December ==
List of shipwrecks: 4 December 1877
Ship	State	Description
Angeneita	Netherlands	The ship was driven ashore in the Nieuwe Diep. She was on a voyage from Hanko, Grand Duchy of Finland to the Nieuwe Diep. She subsequently broke up.
Anna	Germany	The ship sank off Ven, Denmark. Her crew were rescued. She was on a voyage from Höganäs, Sweden to Stettin.
Flora	Norway	The barque was driven ashore in the Nieuwe Diep and was abandoned by her crew. She was on a voyage from Porvoo, Grand Duchy of Finland to Edam, North Holland, Netherlands.
Florence Stephens	New South Wales	The steamship was driven ashore at Port Stephens. All on board were rescued.
Free Lance	United Kingdom	The steamship ran aground in the Bute Channel.
Niord	United Kingdom	The ship was driven ashore in the Nieuwe Diep. She was on a voyage from a Baltic port to Schiedam, South Holland. She was refloated with assistance.
Orient	Germany	The galiot collided with the steamship Breeze and sank in the North Sea. Her four crew managed to get aboard Breeze.
Osbourne	United Kingdom	The brig sprang a leak and foundered in the North Sea 10 nautical miles (19 km) off Whitby, Yorkshire. Her crew were rescued by Sophia (United Kingdom). Osbourne was on a voyage from Leith, Lothian to London.
Pallas	Norway	The full-rigged ship was driven ashore in the Nieuwe Diep. She was on a voyage from Pori, Grand Duchy of Finland to Shoreham-by-Sea, Sussex, United Kingdom.
Prudent	Italy	The ship was driven ashore and wrecked at Gallipoli, Ottoman Empire. She was reported to be on a voyage from Marseille, Bouches-du-Rhône to Tunis, Beylik of Tunis.
Seaham	United Kingdom	The steamship collided with the steamship Breeze (United Kingdom) and sank in the North Sea 4 nautical miles (7.4 km) east of the Haisborough Lightship ( Trinity House). Her fourteen crew were rescued by Breeze and another vessel. Seaham was on a voyage from Goole, Yorkshire to Ghent, East Flanders, Belgium.
Sunda	United Kingdom	The ship caught fire in the Atlantic Ocean and was abandoned by her crew. She was on a voyage from Norfolk, Virginia, United States to Liverpool, Lancashire.

== 5 December ==
List of shipwrecks: 5 December 1877
Ship	State	Description
Canadian	United Kingdom	The brig ran aground on the Drumore Bank, off the coast of County Wexford. She was refloated. She was refloated.
Cornwall	United Kingdom	The steamship collided with the dock gates at Bristol, Gloucestershire and was damaged at the bow. She was on a voyage from Bristol to New York. She was docked for repairs.
European	United Kingdom	The steamship was wrecked on the Chaussée de Keller, in the Atlantic Ocean off Ouessant, Finistère, France. All 102 people on board were rescued by two chasse-marées and the luggers Cecile and La Jeune Florestine (both France). European was on a voyage from Cape Town, Cape Colony to Southampton, Hampshire
Flying Dutchman	United Kingdom	The tug ran ashore at the Cloch Lighthouse, Renfrewshire. She was refloated on 8 December and towed in to Greenock, Renfrewshire.
Foredrin Fredrica	Flag unknown	The ketch was driven ashore and wrecked in White Bay, County Cork, United Kingdom. She was on a voyage from Newport, Monmouthshire to Kinsale, County Cork.
Gorin	Netherlands	The barque was driven ashore on "Seiro". She was on a voyage from West Hartlepool, County Durham, United Kingdom to Korsør, Denmark. She was refloated with assistance and taken in to Korsør.
Lady Zetland	United Kingdom	The schooner sprang a leak and sank 4 nautical miles (7.4 km) off Porthdinllaen, Caernarfonshire. Her three crew survived. She was on a voyage from Bangor, Caernarfonshire to Cork.
Malleable	United Kingdom	The steamship sprang a leak and was beached at Harwich, Essex. She was on a voyage from Middlesbrough, Yorkshire to Southampton, Hampshire.
Progress	United Kingdom	The schooner was wrecked off the Mull of Kintyre, Argyllshire. Her crew took to a boat and landed on Gigha. She was on a voyage from Belfast, County Antrim to Inverness.
Providence	United Kingdom	The ship was driven ashore at Moville, County Donegal. She was refloated.
Sarah Ann Elizabeth	United Kingdom	The ship was driven ashore at Moville. She was on a voyage from Lancaster, Lancashire to Londonderry.
Silistria	Germany	The steamship collided with H. M. Castor (United Kingdom) and ran aground at South Shields, County Durham, United Kingdom. Silistria was on a voyage from South Shields to Hamburg. She was refloated.
Tamaulipas	United Kingdom	The steamship ran aground at Dublin. She was refloated.
Zerina	United Kingdom	The ship departed from Betts Cove, Newfoundland Colony for Liverpool, Lancashire. No further trace, reported missing.

== 6 December ==
List of shipwrecks: 6 December 1877
Ship	State	Description
Anne	United Kingdom	The brigantine was driven ashore and wrecked on the Isle of Arran. Her crew were rescued. She was on a voyage from Dublin to Glasgow, Renfrewshire.
Antias	United Kingdom	The brig ran aground on the Longsand, in the North Sea off the coast of Essex. She was on a voyage from Hartlepool, County Durham to Fécamp, Seine-Inférieure. She was refloated with the assistance of five smacks and assisted in to Harwich, Essex in a leaky condition.
Conqueror	United Kingdom	The fishing smack sank at Exmouth, Devon. Her four crew were rescued.
Johann	Norway	The barque ran aground on the Scarweather Sands, in the Bristol Channel. Her crew were rescued by the lifeboat Chafyn Grove ( Royal National Lifeboat Institution) and Velindra (United Kingdom).
Kensington	United Kingdom	The brigantine was driven ashore and sank at Killiness Point, on the Mull of Galloway, Wigtownshire. She was on a voyage from Maryport, Cumberland to Dublin. She was later refloated and towed in to Whitehaven, Cumberland.
Mizpah	United Kingdom	The steamship collided with another vessel and sank in the English Channel 15 nautical miles (28 km) south west of Beachy Head, Sussex with the loss of eleven of her twelve crew. Mizpah was on a voyage from Seville, Spain to Leith, Lothian.
Nina	United Kingdom	The brig was driven ashore and wrecked at Donmouth, Aberdeenshire. Her crew were rescued by the Aberdeen Lifeboat. She was on a voyage from Tayport, Fife to Boulogne, Pas-de-Calais, France.
Paul	United Kingdom	The ship sprang a leak and was beached in Angle Bay, Pembrokeshire. She was on a voyage from Dundee, Forfarshire to Cardiff, Glamorgan.
Pioneer	United Kingdom	The steamship collided with the quayside and sank at Dublin. She was on a voyage from Dublin to Antwerp, Belgium. She was refloated on 8 December.
Portia	United Kingdom	The brigantine ran aground on the Buxey Sand, in the North Sea off the coast of Essex. She was refloated with assistance from the smack Phoenix.
Union	United Kingdom	The sloop was driven ashore at Orcombe Point, Devon. She was refloated.

== 7 December ==
List of shipwrecks: 7 December 1877
Ship	State	Description
Frankfort	Flag unknown	The steamship struck rocks at Barrahead and was beached in Loch Boisdale. She was on a voyage from Liverpool, Lancashire, United Kingdom to Christiania, Norway.
Friesland	Netherlands	The steamship ran aground and was wrecked off Cape Corrubedo, Spain with the loss of all 144 people on board. She was on a voyage from Batavia, Netherlands East Indies to Rotterdam. Wreckage from the ship washed up at Corrubedo.
James	United Kingdom	The schooner was driven ashore at Ayr. She was on a voyage from Belfast, County Antrim to Ayr.
Mary Ann	United Kingdom	The ship collided with the steamship Penguin (United Kingdom) and sank in the River Thames at Bermondsey, Surrey.
Moonlight	United States	The barque was abandoned in the Atlantic Ocean. Her crew were rescued by the barquentine Elena (Italy). Moonlight was on a voyage from Norfolk, Virginia to Amsterdam, North Holland, Netherlands.
Polly	United Kingdom	The brigantine foundered 10 nautical miles (19 km) off Tory Island, County Donegal. Her crew survived. She was on a voyage from Maryport, Cumberland to Sligo.

== 8 December ==
List of shipwrecks: 8 December 1877
Ship	State	Description
Adele Marie	France	The brig was wrecked on the Turneffe Atoll. She was on a voyage from Belize City, British Honduras to Liverpool, Lancashire, United Kingdom.
Flor	Netherlands	The ship was abandoned in the Nieuwe Diep. She was then driven ashore on Texel, North Holland and broke up.
Germania	Germany	The steamship was driven ashore at Hoek van Holland, South Holland, Netherlands. Her crew were rescued.
Harriet	United Kingdom	The schooner sank at the entrance to Lough Swilly. Her crew were rescued.
Monkseaton	United Kingdom	The steamship collided with the steamship Jenny Otto (United Kingdom) and sank in the North Sea off the coast of County Durham with the loss of a crew member. Survivors were rescued by Jenny Otto. Monkseaton was on a voyage from Rotterdam, South Holland to the River Tyne.
Napthalie	United Kingdom	The schooner ran aground on the North Bank, off the coast of County Dublin. She was on a voyage from Caen, Calvados, France to Dublin.
Renown	United Kingdom	The schooner ran aground at Carlingford, County Louth and was beached.
Seal	United Kingdom	The tug was driven ashore at Cranfield Point, County Louth. She was refloated on 17 December and beached at Warrenpoint, County Down.
Sultana	United Kingdom	The brigantine departed from Sunderland, County Durham for Le Tréport, Seine-Inférieure, France. No further trace, presumed foundered with the loss of all hands.
Zion Hill	United Kingdom	The schooner ran aground on the King's Scar, in the Irish Sea off the coast of Lancashire and sank. Her six crew survived. She was on a voyage from London to Lancaster, Lancashire.

== 9 December ==
List of shipwrecks: 9 December 1877
Ship	State	Description
Active	United Kingdom	The ship broke from her moorings at Dublin. She was driven against the pier and damaged.
Annabourg	United Kingdom	The ship was wrecked on a sandbank. Three crew initially survived the wreck, according to a message in a bottle that washed up in the Parkburn Forth, Scotland in February 1878.
Captain Parry	United Kingdom	The steamship struck the foundations of the North Bull Lighthouse, County Dublin and foundered. Her crew were rescued. She was refloated in January 1878 and towed to Belfast, County Antrim, where she arrived on 2 February for repairs.
Faithlie	United Kingdom	The schooner was severely damaged by fire at Leith, Lothian.
Pearl	United Kingdom	The schooner was driven ashore at Hartley, Northumberland. She was on a voyage from Montrose, Forfarshire to London. She was refloated and assisted in to Blyth, Northumberland.
Victor	United Kingdom	The tug sprang a leak and sank at Leith.

== 10 December ==
List of shipwrecks: 10 December 1877
Ship	State	Description
Cupid	(United Kingdom of Great Britain and Ireland) Jersey	The schooner collided with the steamship Dalton (United Kingdom) and was severely damaged. She was on a voyage from Terceira Island, Azores to Hull, Yorkshire. She put in to Dover, Kent in a sinking condition.
Good Hope	United Kingdom	The steamship ran aground on the Ashrathi Rocks, in the Gulf of Suez. She was on a voyage from Sunderland, County Durham to Jeddah, Hejaz Vilayet and Singapore, Straits Settlements
Helios	Norway	The barque was driven ashore and wrecked at Tananger. She was on a voyage from Trapani, Sicily, Italy to Stavanger.

== 11 December ==
List of shipwrecks: 11 December 1877
Ship	State	Description
Ann	United Kingdom	The snow was wrecked at Peniche, Portugal with the loss of all seven crew. She was on a voyage from Blyth, Northumberland to Lisbon, Portugal and Alexandria, Egypt.
Ennismore	United Kingdom	The steamship was driven ashore at Ravenglass, Cumberland. She was on a voyage from Dublin to Whitehaven, Cumberland.
Imbro	United Kingdom	The steamship ran aground on the Sõrve Peninsula, Saaremaa, Russia. She was on a voyage from Riga, Russia to Sunderland, County Durham.
Köningen Elizabeth	Germany	The ship ran aground at Nantes, Loire-Inférieure. She was on a voyage from Pillau to Nantes. She was refloated on 9 January 1878 and beached at Paimbœuf, Loire-Inférieure.
Orion	United Kingdom	The steamship was driven ashore near the Zerel Lighthouse, Saaremaa, Russia.
Stella	Trieste	The ship was towed in to Lagos, Lagos Colony in a sinking condition.

== 12 December ==
List of shipwrecks: 12 December 1877
Ship	State	Description
Achievement	United Kingdom	The snow collided with the steamship Heron (United Kingdom) and sank off the coast of Norfolk. Her crew were rescued by Heron. Achievement was on a voyage from Blyth, Northumberland to Portsmouth, Hampshire.
Barkley	United Kingdom	The schooner ran aground on the Pakefield Gat, in the North Sea off the coast of Suffolk and sank. Her five crew were rescued by the Kessingland Lifeboat. She was on a voyage from Sunderland, County Durham to Ipswich, Suffolk.
Frigga	Sweden	The brig was driven ashore between Dover and the South Foreland, Kent, United Kingdom. Her nine crew were rescued by the Coastguard. She was on a voyage from Kalix to Dover. She was later refloated and towed in to Dover.
Hannah Rathkens	Germany	The ship was wrecked on the Goodwin Sands, Kent. Her ten crew were rescued by the lugger Champion (United Kingdom and the North Deal Lifeboat. Hannah Rathkens was on a voyage from Sandarne, Sweden to Highbridge, Somerset, United Kingdom.
Jean Paul	United Kingdom	The ship was driven ashore on Saltholmen, Denmark. She was on a voyage from Stettin, Germany to Portsmouth, Hampshire. She was refloated with assistance and towed in to Copenhagen, Denmark.

== 13 December ==
List of shipwrecks: 13 December 1877
Ship	State	Description
Albert	Germany	The schooner was wrecked near Marstrand, Sweden. Her crew were rescued. She was on a voyage from Königsberg to Papenburg.
Dee	United Kingdom	The steamship struck rocks and was damaged. She was on a voyage from Saint-Nazaire, Loire-Inférieure, France to London. She put back to Saint-Nazaire.
Heckla	Sweden	The schooner was driven ashore at "Preston". She was on a voyage from Malmö to Oskarshamn.
Kate	United Kingdom	The brig ran aground at Maryport, Cumberland. She was on a voyage from Londonderry to Maryport.
Oscar	Denmark	The ship foundered off Læsø.
Vigo	United Kingdom	The schooner was driven ashore at Kilcorgan Point, County Galway. She was on a voyage from London to Sligo. She was later refloated and taken in to a port.

== 14 December ==
List of shipwrecks: 14 December 1877
Ship	State	Description
Ada Elizabeth	United Kingdom	The schooner ran aground at the mouth of the River Orwell. She was on a voyage from Penzance, Cornwall to Ipswich, Suffolk. She was later refloated and taken in to Ipswich.
Autumna	United Kingdom	The brigantine collided with the Bull Lightship ( Trinity House) and was beached at Spurn Point, Yorkshire. Autumna was abandoned by her crew. She was on a voyage from Hull, Yorkshire to Exeter, Devon.
B. D. Metcalf	United Kingdom	The ship departed from Samarang, Netherlands East Indies for a British port. No further trace, reported missing.
British Rover	United Kingdom	The fishing smack was driven ashore and wrecked at Blakeney, Norfolk.
Hugh Streatfield	United Kingdom	The steamship ran aground on the Haisborough Sands, in the North Sea off the coast of Norfolk. She was on a voyage from Sunderland, County Durham to Ostend, West Flanders, Belgium. She was refloated with assistance from the tug United Service (United Kingdom) and resumed her voyage.
Louisa	United Kingdom	The schooner ran aground on the Maplin Sand, in the North Sea off the coast of Essex. She was refloated and resumed her voyage.
Waterloo	United Kingdom	The ship ran aground on the Goodwin Sands, Kent. She was on a voyage from Blyth, Northumberland to Torre del Mar, Spain. She was refloated the next day and taken in to The Downs.

== 15 December ==
List of shipwrecks: 15 December 1877
Ship	State	Description
Aios	Greece	The barque was driven ashore and wrecked at Sanlúcar de Barrameda, Spain. Her crew were rescued. She was on a voyage from Cádiz to Seville, Spain.
Albert Edward	United Kingdom	The steamship ran aground in the River Thames at the Coalhouse Fort, Essex.
Alice	United Kingdom	The ship arrived at London on fire. She was on a voyage from Rangoon, Burma and Bassein, India to London. The fire was extinguished.
August Tietje, and Ludwig	Germany	The barques were severely damaged by fire at Wilmington, Delaware, United States.
Azorian	United Kingdom	The schooner ran aground on the Brake Sand. She was on a voyage from Newcastle upon Tyne, Northumberland to Waterford. She was refloated and taken in to Ramsgate, Kent.
Lady Louisa	United Kingdom	The ship sprang a leak and was beached at New Ferry, Cheshire. She was on a voyage from Hamburg to Liverpool, Lancashire. She was refloated on 18 December and taken in to Runcorn, Cheshire.
Nordlyset	Denmark	The steamship foundered off Texel, North Holland with the loss of seven of her 23 crew and two lifeboatmen. She was on a voyage from Riga, Russia to Antwerp, Belgium.
Stad Middelburg	Netherlands	The paddle steamer struck floating wreckage, damaging both paddle wheels. She was on a voyage from Vlissingen, Zeeland to Queenborough, Kent. She put in to Ostend, West Flanders, Belgium.
No. 1	Netherlands	The pilot boat collided with the steamship Thomas Vaughan (United Kingdom) and was damaged. She was towed in to Hellevoetsluis, Zeeland in a severely leaky condition.

== 17 December ==
List of shipwrecks: 17 December 1877
Ship	State	Description
Christinenstadt	Austria-Hungary	The ship ran aground on the Sunk Sand, in the North Sea off the coast of Essex, United Kingdom. She was on a voyage from Bremerhaven, Germany to "Dobery". She was refloated with the assistance of a tug and four smacks and assisted in to Harwich, Essex.
Eunomia	Germany	The galiot was driven ashore at Dragør, Denmark. She was on a voyage from Hamburg to Copenhagen, Denmark.
José, and Raphael	Spain; United States	The steamship José collided with the full-rigged ship Raphael in the River Mersey. Both vessels were severely damaged. José was on a voyage from Barcelona to Liverpool, Lancashire, United Kingdom. Raphael was on a voyage from Liverpool to Bombay, India. Both vessels were taken in to Liverpool.
Tamaulipas	United Kingdom	The steamship ran aground in the River Liffey at Dublin and broke in two. Her crew were rescued. She was on a voyage from Swansea, Glamorgan to Rouen, Seine-Inférieure. She was a total loss.
Wika	Sweden	The steamship was driven ashore at Össby, Öland. She was on a voyage from Lübeck, Germany to Reval, Russia. She was refloated and taken in to Karlskrona in a leaky condition.

== 18 December ==
List of shipwrecks: 18 December 1877
Ship	State	Description
Carolus	United Kingdom	The ship was driven ashore at Southwold, Suffolk. She was on a voyage from Hartlepool, County Durham to Southwold.
Don	United Kingdom	The schooner ran aground on Scroby Sands, Norfolk. She was on a voyage from Sunderland, County Durham to Great Yarmouth, Norfolk. She was refloated with the assistance of a tug and towed in to Great Yarmouth.
Jeune Farnand	France	The ship was driven ashore and wrecked on Vlieland, Friesland, Netherlands. She was on a voyage from Halmstad, Sweden to Saint-Brieuc, Côtes-du-Nord.
Johanna	United Kingdom	The ship ran aground at Southwold and collided with Carolus (United Kingdom).
Nordlysch	Denmark	The steamship was wrecked on the Haaks Bank, in the North Sea off the Dutch coast with the loss of seven of her eight crew. Two lifeboatmen were drowned attempting a rescue. She was on a voyage from Riga, Russia to Antwerp, Belgium.
Thomas Etherden	United Kingdom	The sailing barge collided with the barque El Dorado (United Kingdom) off Dungeness, Kent. Thomas Etherden was taken in tow by the luggers Lady Rose and Renown (both United Kingdom) but consequently sank. Her crew were rescued by Renown. Thomas Etherden was on a voyage from Goole, Yorkshire to London.

== 19 December ==
List of shipwrecks: 19 December 1877
Ship	State	Description
Charles Batters	United Kingdom	The steamship was wrecked on the Salt Scar Rocks, on the coast of Yorkshire. She was on a voyage from Bilbao, Spain to Liverpool, Lancashire.
Desengano	Spain	The ship was wrecked on the north coast of Haiti. She was on a voyage from Cap-Haïtien to "Port Liberté", Haiti.
Forester	United Kingdom	The ship was driven ashore at Hartlepool, County Durham. She was refloated with the assistance of two tugs.
Steinvoia	Canada	The ship ran aground at Lydd, Kent, United Kingdom. She was on a voyage from Ostend, West Flanders, Belgium to Tybee Island, Georgia, United States. She was refloated and resumed her voyage.
Thomas Dugdale	United Kingdom	The steamship ran aground at Fleetwood, Lancashire. She was on a voyage from Fleetwood to Belfast, County Antrim. She was refloated the next day and resumed her voyage.

== 20 December ==
List of shipwrecks: 20 December 1877
Ship	State	Description
Amy	United Kingdom	The ship ran aground on the Salt Scar Rocks, on the coast of Yorkshire. She was on a voyage from Ipswich, Suffolk to Middlesbrough, Yorkshire. She was refloated and taken in to Hartlepool, County Durham.
Bentinck	United Kingdom	The steamship became waterlogged at Garston, Lancashire due to a port being left open.
Betis	Spain	The steamship was wrecked on Piedra Aro, off Sant Feliu de Guíxols with the loss of eight of her 21 crew.
Breeze	United Kingdom	The steamship ran aground off Læsø, Denmark. She was on a voyage from Hartlepool, County Durham to Flensburg, Germany. She was refloated and resumed her voyage.
Excelsior	United Kingdom	The ship ran aground at Rangoon, Burma.
Gloamin	United Kingdom	The steamship was driven ashore and wrecked at Flamborough Head, Yorkshire. Her crew were rescued. She was on a voyage from Burntisland, Fife to Calais, France. Gloamin broke up on 23 December.
Go-Ahead	United Kingdom	The schooner ran aground off Ramore Head, County Antrim and sank off Reviggerty Point. Her crew were rescued by a pilot boat. She was on a voyage from Port Ellen, Islay to Portrush, County Antrim.
Harwich	United Kingdom	The barque ran aground in the Elbe. She was on a voyage from Hamburg, Germany to Baltimore, Maryland, United States. She was refloated and taken in to Hamburg in a leaky condition and placed under repair.
Lord Houghton	United Kingdom	The steamship struck rocks off "Cape Tilly", France and was consequently beached at Dieppe, Seine-Inférieure, France. She was on a voyage from Cardiff, Glamorgan to Dieppe.
Mavis	United Kingdom	The steamship ran aground in the Seine. She was on a voyage from Cardiff to Rouen, Seine-Inférieure. She was refloated and taken in to Rouen.
Möwe	Germany	The steamship collided with the steamships Fusi Yama and Severn (both United Kingdom) and was beached at North Greenwich, Essex, United Kingdom. Möwe was on a voyage from London, United Kingdom to Bremen.
Rose	United Kingdom	The steamship was sighted off Copenhagen, Denmark whilst on a voyage from Hull, Yorkshire to Reval, Russia. No further trace, presumed foundered in the Baltic Sea with the loss of all seventeen crew.
Unnamed	Flag unknown	The barge sank off Dungenes, Kent, United Kingdom.

== 21 December ==
List of shipwrecks: 21 December 1877
Ship	State	Description
Chance	United Kingdom	The galiot ran aground at Skibbereen, County Cork.
Ebenezer	United Kingdom	The ship was driven ashore on Filey Brigg, Yorkshire. She was on a voyage from Hartlepool, County Durham to Portsmouth, Hampshire. She was later refloated and resumed her voyage.
Paraguay, and Wiltshire	France; United Kingdom	The steamship Paraguay collided with the full-rigged ship Wiltshire in the Atlantic Ocean. Both vessels were severely damaged and put in to Saint Vincent. Paraguay was on a voyage from Montevideo, Uruguay to Havre de Grâce, Seine-Inférieure. Wiltshire was on a voyage from Cardiff, Glamorgan to Ceylon.
Pioneer	United Kingdom	The ketch foundered in Tor Bay off Hope's Nose, Devon. Her crew survived.
Sarah	United Kingdom	The anchor boat was run into by the Mersey Flat Catherine (United Kingdom) and sank in the River Mersey.
Sorromostro	Spain	The steamship ran aground at Bilbao and was holed. She was refloated the next day and put back to Bilbao.

== 22 December ==
List of shipwrecks: 22 December 1877
Ship	State	Description
Agnes	United Kingdom	The schooner ran aground at Dundee, Forfarshire. She was on a voyage from Dundee to Lindisfarne, Northumberland. She was refloated on 24 December and resumed her voyage.
Boreas	France	The barque was driven ashore at Sadras, India.
Craig Ellachie	Flag unknown	The 226-ton brig went ashore at Timaru, New Zealand and became a total wreck when she parted her cables during a storm.
Independencia	Imperial Brazilian Navy	The ironclad ran aground in the River Thames at Greenwich, Kent, United Kingdom. She was refloated on 25 December and towed in to Greenhithe, Kent.
Jessie Meek	United Kingdom	The schooner ran aground on the Platters Rocks. She was refloated and was beached at Holyhead, Anglesey. She was on a voyage from Bridgwater, Somerset to Glasgow, Renfrewshire.
Lion	United Kingdom	The ship ran aground on the Swadman Rocks, off the coast of Northumberland, She was on a voyage from Leith, Lothian to a French port. She was refloated and taken in to North Sunderland, Northumberland.
Mysterious Star	United Kingdom	The ship was driven ashore at "Salto". Nine of her crew took to a boat; they were subsequently reported missing. She was on a voyage from Kotka, Grand Duchy of Finland to Sunderland, County Durham. She was refloated and taken in to Lysekil, Sweden.
Nettuno	Italy	The barque ran aground on the Barnard Sand, in the North Sea off the coast of Suffolk, United Kingdom. She was on a voyage from Baltimore, Maryland, United States to King's Lynn, Norfolk, United Kingdom. She was refloated with the assistance of a fishing smack and resumed her voyage.
Peace and Plenty	United Kingdom	The sloop was driven ashore and wrecked at Heckness, Orkney Islands.
Vier Broeders	Netherlands	The ship foundered in the English Channel off Winchelsea, Sussex, United Kingdom. Her crew were rescued by the Winchelsea Lifeboat Sea Sprite ( Royal National Lifeboat Institution). Vier Broeders was on a voyage from Groningen to Portsmouth, Hampshire, United Kingdom.

== 23 December ==
List of shipwrecks: 23 December 1877
Ship	State	Description
Albany, and an unnamed vessel	Cape Colony	The tug and a lighter were driven ashore and wrecked at Port Alfred.
Bertha	Germany	The abandoned schooner was taken in to West Hartlepool, County Durham, United Kingdom in a waterlogged condition by the tug Skylark (United Kingdom).
Berdinkha	United Kingdom	The brig was wrecked on the North Sands, Hartlepool. Her crew were rescued by the Coastguard, and the Hartlepool Lifeboat, which rescued fourteen people. She was on a voyage from Aberdeen to Hartlepool, County Durham.
Cossack	United Kingdom	The steamship was driven ashore on Læsø, Denmark. She was on a voyage from Hull, Yorkshire to Königsberg, Germany. She was refloated in early January 1878.
Hampshire	United Kingdom	The barque was destroyed by fire at sea. Her sixteen crew were rescued by the whaler James Allan (United States). Hampshire was on a voyage from Swansea, Glamorgan to Valparaíso, Chile.
Petrel	United Kingdom	The dandy rigged schooner was run down and sunk off Pladda by the steamship Rose. Her crew were rescued. Petrel was on a voyage from Glasgow, Renfrewshire to Dublin.

== 24 December ==
List of shipwrecks: 24 December 1877
Ship	State	Description
Adonis	United Kingdom	The tug struck the Drum Sands and was beached at Leith, Lothian. She was on a voyage from South Shields, County Durham to Grangemouth, Stirlingshire.
Blanche	United Kingdom	The schooner was driven ashore and wrecked at Ballyhalbert, County Down.
Reward	(United Kingdom of Great Britain and Ireland) Jersey	The smack was run into by the schooner Residue and sank in the North Sea. Her crew were rescued. Reward was on a voyage from Montrose, Forfarshire to Penzance, Cornwall.
Richmond	United Kingdom	The brig ran aground in the Clyde near Fort Matilda, Renfrewshire. She was on a voyage from Glasgow, Renfrewshire to Dublin. She was refloated and towed in to Greenock, Renfrewshire.
Sea Belle	United Kingdom	The paddle tug foundered in the North Sea with the loss of four of her seven crew.

== 25 December ==
List of shipwrecks: 25 December 1877
Ship	State	Description
Calypso	France	The steamship ran aground in the Gironde.
Chelydra	United Kingdom	The steamship was wrecked on the Silver Bank, in the Virgin Islands. Her crew were rescued. She was on a voyage from Newcastle upon Tyne, Northumberland to New Orleans, Louisiana, United States.
Danaë	United Kingdom	The steamship foundered in the North Sea off the Danish coast. Her nineteen crew were rescued by the fishing smack Smiling Morn (United Kingdom). She was on a voyage from Reval, Russia to London.
Dorothea	Denmark	The barque foundered in the Baltic Sea with the loss of eight of her ten crew. Survivors were rescued by the brig Medora (United Kingdom). Dorothea was on a voyage from Alloa, Clackmannanshire, United Kingdom to Helsingør.
Minerva	Germany	The steamship was wrecked near Thisted, Denmark with the loss of three of her crew. She was on a voyage from Memel to Rotterdam, South Holland Netherlands.
Petersburg	United Kingdom	The steamship was severely damaged by fire at Leith, Lothian.
Staffa	United Kingdom	The ship ran aground in the River Mersey. She was on a voyage from Liverpool, Lancashire to Bombay, India. She was refloated and taken in to Birkenhead, Cheshire.
St. Joseph	France	The barque was wrecked on the coast of Borneo, Netherlands East Indies. Her crew were rescued. She was on a voyage from Labuan, Malaya to Hong Kong.
Thetis	United Kingdom	The ship was driven ashore at Cowes, Isle of Wight. She was refloated on 30 December.

== 26 December ==
List of shipwrecks: 26 December 1877
Ship	State	Description
Amanda	Germany	The galiot was driven ashore and wrecked at Lemvig, Denmark. Her crew were rescued. She was on a voyage from Fredrikstad, Denmark to Hamburg.
Carl Tottie	Norway	The barque was driven ashore and wrecked at Lemvig. Her crew were rescued. She was on a voyage from Calais, France to Fredrikstad.
Borthwick	United Kingdom	The steamship ran aground off Goeree, Zeeland, Netherlands. She was on a voyage from Maryport, Cumberland to Rotterdam, South Holland, Netherland. She was refloated.
Eliza	Norway	The schooner was driven ashore and wrecked at Thisted, Denmark. She was on a voyage from Tønsberg to Greanton, Lothian, United Kingdom.
Fire Queen	United Kingdom	The steamship was driven ashore at New York, United States. She was on a voyage from Liverpool, Lancashire to New Orleans, Louisiana.
Fredrik VII	Norway	The barque was wrecked on Amrum, Germany. Her crew were rescued. She was on a voyage from Drammen to London, United Kingdom.
Havfruen	Norway	The barque was driven ashore and wrecked at Lemvig. Her crew were rescued. She was on a voyage from Liverpool to Sandefjord.
John Wilson	Norway	The brig was driven ashore and wrecked at Lemvig. Her crew were rescued. She was on a voyage from Ipswich, Suffolk, United Kingdom to Grimstad.
Mary Wilson	United Kingdom	The brig ran aground on the Otter Bank, in Loch Ryan and was abandoned by her crew. She was on a voyage from Dublin to Ardrossan, Ayrshire.
Oriana	United Kingdom	The steamship ran aground and was wrecked at "Catacola Point", Greece. Her crew were rescued. She was on a voyage from "Catacola" to London.
Petersburg	United Kingdom	The steamship was severely damaged by fire at Leith, Lothian.
Prospect	United Kingdom	The schooner was driven ashore and wrecked in Eyemouth Bay. Both crew were rescued by the Eyemouth Lifeboat. She was on a voyage from Bridgwater, Somerset to Eyemouth, Berwickshire.
Vertrauen	Germany	The brigantine was wrecked at Lemvig, Denmark. She was on a voyage from Grimsby, Lincolnshire, United Kingdom to Danzig.
Walmer Castle	United Kingdom	The barque was destroyed by fire at Batavia, Netherlands East Indies.
Wenonah	United Kingdom	The barque was driven ashore at New York. She was on a voyage from Liverpool to Galveston, Texas, United States. She was refloated.

== 27 December ==
List of shipwrecks: 27 December 1877
Ship	State	Description
Carfin	United Kingdom	The steamship struck a submerged object at Troon, Ayrshire and was damaged. She was on a voyage from Bilbao, Spain to Troon.
Gessein Schreuder	Netherlands	The ship was wrecked on Ameland, Friesland. Her crew were rescued. She was on a voyage from Larvik, Norway to Delfzijl, Groningen.
Janet	Sweden	The ship departed from Sunderland, County Durham, United Kingdom for Cagliari, Sardinia, Italy. No further trace, reported missing.
Kinghorn	United Kingdom	The steamship ran aground in the Nieuwe Waterweg. She was on a voyage from Leith, Lothian to Rotterdam, South Holland, Netherlands.
Leicester	United Kingdom	The ship sprang a leak and was beached on Bawean, Netherlands East Indies. She was on a voyage from Yokohama, Japan to Batavia, Netherlands East Indies.
Pauline	Germany	The barque was wrecked at Wierum, Friesland. Her crew were rescued. She was on a voyage from Bremerhaven to New York, United States.
Saint Cloud	United Kingdom	The full-rigged ship was driven ashore at Savannah, Georgia, United States. She was on a voyage from Liverpool, Lancashire to Tybee Island, Georgia.
Sarah King	United Kingdom	The schooner was driven ashore at Eastbourne, Sussex. She was on a voyage from Sunderland, County Durham to Portsmouth, Hampshire.

== 28 December ==
List of shipwrecks: 28 December 1877
Ship	State	Description
Brierly Hill	United Kingdom	The brig was driven ashore and wrecked on the Danish coast with the loss of all but one of her eight crew. She was on a voyage from Kotka, Grand Duchy of Finland to London.
Eastern Star	United Kingdom	The barque was driven ashore at Pensacola, Florida, United States. She was refloated with assistance.
Julie Ernestine	France	The barque was driven ashore at Pensacola.
Nuovo Matteo	Italy	The ship was driven ashore on the Delaware Breakwater. She was on a voyage from Philadelphia, Pennsylvania, United States to Newcastle upon Tyne, Northumberland, United Kingdom.
Osteran	Norway	The barque was driven ashore at Pensacola.
Scotia	United Kingdom	The barque was driven ashore near "Briskins", Zeeland, Netherlands. She was on a voyage from Baltimore, Maryland, United States to Antwerp, Belgium.
Swaledale	United Kingdom	The steamship ran aground in the Suez Canal. She was on a voyage from Calcutta, India to Dundee, Forfarshire. She was refloated on 30 December and resumed her voyage.

== 29 December ==
List of shipwrecks: 29 December 1877
Ship	State	Description
Altieri	Germany	The schooner was wrecked near Marstrand, Sweden.
Aura	United Kingdom	The brigantine was wrecked on Holy Isle, in the Firth of Clyde. Her crew were rescued. She was on a voyage from Ayr to Belfast, County Antrim.
Ensimainen	(Russian Empire) Grand Duchy of Finland	The schooner was wrecked on the Haisborough Sands, in the North Sea off the coast of Norfolk, United Kingdom. All twelve people on board got aboard the Haisborough Lightship ( Trinity House), from where they were rescued by the Palling Lifeboat British Workman ( Royal National Lifeboat Institution). Ensimainen was on a voyage from Baltimore, Maryland, United States to Wisbech, Cambridgeshire, United Kingdom.
Fairy Queen	United Kingdom	The steamship ran aground on the Carr Rocks, off the coast of Lothian. Her crew were rescued.
Golden Fleece	United Kingdom	The ship was driven ashore and wrecked on Fair Isle. Her three crew were rescued. She was on a voyage from the Shetland Isles to Fair Isle.
Grangemouth	United Kingdom	The steamship was driven ashore in the Firth of Forth.
Ida	Russia	The brig was driven ashore at Östergarnsholm, Sweden. She was on a voyage from Turku, Grand Duchy of Finland to Helsingør, Denmark.
Jylland	Denmark	The steamship struck rocks at Seaton, County Durham, United Kingdom and sank. Her thirteen crew were rescued by a pilot boat.
Oceano	United Kingdom	The steamship collided with the steamship Virgo (United Kingdom) and was beached in the River Thames at Gravesend, Kent. Oceano was on a voyage from São Miguel Island, Azores to London. She subsequently sank. She was refloated on 20 January 1878 and moved 1 nautical mile (1.9 km) upstream and beached for temporary repairs.
Tyrian	United Kingdom	The steamship ran aground in the Clyde. She was on a voyage from Glasgow, Renfrewshire to Bombay, India. She was refloated with assistance from the steamship Despatch and a tug (both United Kingdom) and put back to Glasgow.
William and John	United Kingdom	The schooner was driven ashore and wrecked at Carnsore Point County Wexford. Her crew were rescued. She was on a voyage from Truro, Cornwall to Campbeltown, Argyllshire.

== 30 December ==
List of shipwrecks: 30 December 1877
Ship	State	Description
Francesco	Flag unknown	The ship ran aground in the Dardanelles. She was on a voyage from Rodosto, Ottoman Empire to Falmouth, Cornwall, United Kingdom.
Lena	United Kingdom	The barque was run into by the steamship Alford and sank in the River Thames.
Midas	United Kingdom	The barque ran aground off Camden Fort, County Cork. She was on a voyage from Prince Edward Island, Canada to Queenstown, County Cork. She was refloated.
Fortunato	Germany	The brigantine was wrecked at Porto, Portugal. Her crew were rescued. She was on a voyage from Hamburg to Porto.

== 31 December ==
List of shipwrecks: 31 December 1877
Ship	State	Description
Clausina	United Kingdom	The barque was wrecked on the Lampa Shoal, off the coast of El Salvador. Her crew were rescued on 2 January 1878 by the steamship Cyane (Flag unknown). Clausina was on a voyage from Guayaquil, Ecuador to La Unión, El Salvador.
Emmanuel	Malta	The ship was driven ashore on Marmara Island, Ottoman Empire.
Maiden Bower	United Kingdom	The schooner was driven ashore and wrecked at Breaksea Point, Glamorgan. All twelve people on board were rescued. She was on a voyage from Palermo, Sicily, Italy to Cardiff, Glamorgan.
Sire	Denmark	The schooner was driven ashore at Lemvig. She was on a voyage from London to Horsens.
Tawtholite	United Kingdom	The ship was run into by the steamship Erith (United Kingdom) and sank in the River Thames at Gravesend.

== Unknown date ==
List of shipwrecks: Unknown date in December 1877
Ship	State	Description
Alice	United Kingdom	The steamship sailed from Madeira (from West Africa for London) and was not seen again. She, and crew of 12, were believed lost in storms in the Bay of Biscay in early December.
Anna Ottilie	Denmark	The ship was driven ashore on Nexø. She was refloated and taken in to a port.
Annie Johns	United States	The ship was abandoned at sea before 22 December.
Balder	Norway	The ship ran aground on the Kobbergrunden, off Fredrikshavn, Denmark. Her crew were rescued. She was on a voyage from Holmstadt to Randers, Denmark.
Barletta	Italy	The brig was driven ashore at "Bajo Seco", Venezuela. She was on a voyage from Maracaibo, Venezuela to Genoa. She was consequently condemnded.
Belaunce	France	The ship was wrecked at Pernambuco, Brazil before 15 December with some loss of life. She was on a voyage from Marseille, Bouches-du-Rhône to Mauritius.
Berlin	Germany	The schooner foundered at sea before 20 December. Her crew were rescued.
Bridgetown	United Kingdom	The barque was driven ashore near Donegal. She was on a voyage from Baltimore, Maryland, United States to Donegal. She was later refloated.
Britannia	United Kingdom	The smack was driven ashore at Filey, Yorkshire. She was refloated.
Camarata	United Kingdom	The steamship ran aground in the Guadalquivir at Seville, Spain. She was refloated.
Campidoglio	Italy	The ship was driven ashore at Marcus Hook, Pennsylvania, United States. She was on a voyage from Genoa to Philadelphia, Pennsylvania.
Chilianwallah	Canada	The brigantine was abandoned in the Atlantic Ocean before 5 December.
City of Dublin	United Kingdom	The steamship was driven ashore at Vlissingen, Zeeland, Netherlands. She was refloated on 18 December and taken in to Vlissingen.
Cosmopolita	Spain	The ship was severely damaged by fire whilst on a voyage from Manila, Spanish East Indies to Santander.
David Harrison	United Kingdom	The ship ran aground and was wrecked in the Rio Pongas before 7 December. She was on a voyage from Liverpool, Lancashire to the Rio Pongas.
Delight	United Kingdom	The ship was driven ashore and wrecked at Drogheda, County Louth. Her crew were rescued. She was on a voyage from Workington, Cumberland to Dublin.
Dido	Germany	The barque foundered at sea before 10 December. Her crew were rescued. She was on a voyage from Rotterdam, South Holland to Buenos Aires, Argentina.
Diligent	United Kingdom	The ship was driven ashore and wrecked at Cloghy, County Down.
Dorothea	Germany	The schooner ran aground at the mouth of the Aalbek. She was on a voyage from Rostock to Ghent, East Flanders, Belgium. She was refloated and taken in to Fredrikshavn, Denmark.
Dorthea	Denmark	The barque foundered with the loss of all hands.
Dublin	United Kingdom	The steamship was wrecked on Arranmore, County Donegal. She was on a voyage from Killybegs, County Donegal to Troon, Ayrshire.
Duen	Norway	The ship foundered in the Baltic Sea before 27 December.
Eidswold	Norway	The brig ran aground on the Goodwin Sands, Kent, United Kingdom. She was refloated with assistance from the tug Aid (United Kingdom) and Ramsgate Lifeboat and was taken in to Ramsgate, Kent.
Eldorado	United Kingdom	The barque was abandoned 10 nautical miles (19 km) off Porto, Portugal. Her crew were rescued by the tug Velos (Portugal). Elodorado was on a voyage from Hull, Yorkshire to Beaufort, Maine, United States. She was subsequently driven ashore and wrecked at Mindelo.
Enrico Dandolo	Italy	The barque foundered in the Atlantic Ocean. Her crew were rescued by Marco Polo (United States). Enrico Dandolo was on a voyage from New York, United States to Queenstown, County Cork, United Kingdom.
Flintshire	United Kingdom	The steamship ran aground on the Scarborough Shoal. She was on a voyage from Singapore, Straits Settlements to Hong Kong. She was refloated and completed her voyage.
Frederico	United Kingdom	The ship was wrecked off "Roche's Point". She was on a voyage from Newport, Monmouthshire to Kinsale, County Cork.
Glenericht	United Kingdom	The ship caught fire and was abandoned in the Indian Ocean before 11 December. Nineteen people were rescued by Cheviot; the rest by Iquique (both United Kingdom). Glenericht was on a voyage from London to Singapore.
G. M. Jones	United Kingdom	The brig collided with the steamship Pottsville (United States) and sank with the loss of eight of her nine crew. The survivor was rescued by Pottsville. G. M. Jones was on a voyage from New York to Halifax, Nova Scotia, Canada.
Harry	United States	The brig was driven ashore in Chesapeake Bay. She was on a voyage from the Spanish Main to Baltimore, Maryland.
Hestia	United Kingdom	The steamship ran aground near Kingsbridge, Devon.
Huntsville	United States	The ship was destroyed by fire in the Atlantic Ocean. Her crew were rescued. She was on a voyage from Savannah, Georgia to New York.
James	United Kingdom	The schooner was driven ashore at Newcastle, County Down. Her crew were rescued. She was on a voyage from Swansea to Drogheda, County Louth.
Jane Stewart	Canada	The barquentine was abandoned at sea. Her crew were rescued.
Johann Rudolph	Germany	The brig was destroyed by fire off Mindoro, Spanish East Indies before 17 December. Her crew were rescued. She was on a voyage from Manila, Spanish East Indies to Sydney, New South Wales.
John Bogle	United Kingdom	The ship was driven ashore at Ballywalter, County Down. She was on a voyage from Chester, Cheshire to Waterford.
John Parker	Canada	The full-rigged ship was abandoned in the Atlantic Ocean She was discovered at 37°30′N 48°40′W by Maggie (United Kingdom), which set her afire.
King Ja-Ja	United Kingdom	The steamship was abandoned off Great Orme Head, Caernarfonshire. Her ten crew were rescued by the Orme's Head Lifeboat.
Korsør	Denmark	The steamship was driven ashore on Læsø. She was refloated and resumed her voyage.
Lady Shetland	United Kingdom	The ship sprang a leak 4 nautical miles (7.4 km) off Caernarfon and was abandoned by her crew.
Leading Wind	United Kingdom	The ship was driven ashore at Astoria, Oregon, United States. She was refloated and taken in to San Francisco, California for repairs.
Louis	France	The brig was abandoned at sea. Her crew reached shore in a boat. She was on a voyage from Marseille to Saint-Malo, Ille-et-Vilaine. She was subsequently towed in to Barcelona, Spain by the steamship Livonia (Italy).
Louise	Germany	The barque was abandoned in the Atlantic Ocean before 6 December.
Maggie V. Hugg	United States	The barque was driven ashore on Nevis. She was refloated and taken in to Saint Thomas, Virgin Islands in a leaky condition.
Mardol	France	The ship was wrecked on the north coast of Madeira with the loss of two of her crew. She was on a voyage from Bordeaux, Gironde to Akyab, Burma.
Mary E. Rankin	United States	The ship was destroyed by fire at Bermuda. She was on a voyage from Philadelphia, Pennsylvania to Trieste.
Merry England	United Kingdom	The ship was wrecked on the Pickles Reef before 17 December. Her crew were rescued. She was on a voyage from a Mexican port to Falmouth, Cornwall.
Nebo	United Kingdom	The brig foundered off Prince Edward Island, Canada between 20 and 20 December with the loss of all nine crew.
Nimbus	United Kingdom	The ship was wrecked at Portland.
Pallion	United Kingdom	The brig ran aground on the Goodwin Sands. She was on a voyage from Sunderland, County Durham to Honfleur, Manche. She was refloated and towed in to Ramsgate.
Pilgrim	United Kingdom	The ship was driven ashore in the Columbia River. She was on a voyage from Astoria, Oregon, United States to Falmouth, Cornwall. She was refloated and taken in to San Francisco, California, United States for repairs.
Sarah Watson	United Kingdom	The ship was driven ashore and wrecked at "Ekapilly". Her crew were rescued.
Seal	United Kingdom	The tug was driven ashore in the Carlingford Lough. She was refloated and beached at Warrenpoint, County Antrim.
Segunda Triump	Spain	The barque was driven ashore and wrecked at San Juan, Puerto Rico. Her crew survived. She was on a voyage from Liverpool to Mayagüez, Puerto Rico.
Shadwan	United Kingdom	The steamship ran aground in the Red Sea near Jeddah, Hejaz Vilayet. She was on a voyage from South Shields to Bombay, India. She was refloated and completed her voyage, arriving at Bombay on 18 November.
Spray	United Kingdom	The ship was driven ashore at Saltfleet, Lincolnshire.
Spray	United Kingdom	The steamship was driven ashore at Laboe, Germany. She was on a voyage from Newcastle upon Tyne, Northumberland to Kiel, Germany. She was refloated and completed her voyage.
Teutonia	United Kingdom	The steamship ran aground 2 nautical miles (3.7 km) off Cape Mayor, near Santander, Spain.
Thomas and William	United Kingdom	The ship ran aground "in the Hoorn". She was on a voyage from Rye, Sussex to Maassluis, South Holland. She was refloated and completed her voyage.
Yeo	United Kingdom	The ship ran aground and was severely damaged near Appledore, Devon. She was on a voyage from Bideford to Barnstaple.
