= List of Areas of Special Scientific Interest in County Antrim =

This is a list of the Areas of Special Scientific Interest (ASSIs) in County Antrim in Northern Ireland, United Kingdom.

In Northern Ireland the body responsible for designating ASSIs is the Northern Ireland Environment Agency – a division of the Department of Environment (DoE).

Unlike the SSSIs, ASSIs include both natural environments and man-made structures. As with SSSIs, these sites are designated if they have criteria based on fauna, flora, geological or physiographical features. On top of this, structures are also covered, such as the Whitespots mines in Conlig, according to several criterion including rarity, recorded history and intrinsic appeal.

For other sites in the rest of the United Kingdom, see List of SSSIs by Area of Search.

The data in the table is taken from the Northern Ireland Environment Agency's website in the form of citation sheets for each ASSI.

Site name	Reason for Designation			Area^{[A]}		Council	Year declared	Map
Site name	Biological Interest	Geological Interest	Historical or Cultural Interest	Hectares	Acres	Council	Year declared	Map
Aghnadarragh		✓		3.5	8.7	Antrim	2004	

- Ballycarry ASSI
- Ballycastle, County Antrim Coalfield ASSI
- Ballygill North ASSI
- Ballymacaldrack ASSI
- Ballynanaghten ASSI
- Ballypalady ASSI
- Black Burn ASSI
- Breen Wood ASSI
- Caldanagh Bog ASSI
- Carey Valley ASSI
- Carrickarade ASSI
- Castle Point ASSI
- Castletown ASSI
- Church Bay ASSI
- Cleggan Valley ASSI
- Cloghastucan ASSI
- Cloghfin Port ASSI
- Copeland Reservoir ASSI
- Craigahulliar ASSI
- Craigs ASSI
- Culnafay ASSI
- Dunloy Bog ASSI
- Fair Head and Murlough Bay ASSI
- Feystown ASSI
- Frosses Bog ASSI
- Galboly ASSI
- Garron Plateau ASSI
- Garry Bog ASSI
- Garry Bog Part II ASSI
- Giant's Causeway and Dunseverick ASSI
- Glarryford ASSI
- Glenariff ASSI
- Glenariff Glen ASSI
- Glenarm Woods ASSI
- Glenarm Woods Part 2
- Glenballyemon River ASSI
- Glen Burn ASSI
- Gortnagory ASSI
- Inner Belfast Lough ASSI
- Kinramer South ASSI
- Larne Lough ASSI
- Leathemstown ASSI
- Lemnalary ASSI
- Linford ASSI
- Little Deer Park ASSI
- Lough Beg ASSI
- Lough Neagh ASSI
- Minnis ASSI
- Montiaghs Moss ASSI
- Newlands ASSI
- North Woodburn Glen ASSI
- North Woodburn Reservoir ASSI
- Outer Belfast Lough ASSI
- Portballintrae ASSI
- Portmore Lough ASSI
- Portmuck ASSI
- Portrush West Strand ASSI
- Ramore Head and The Skerries ASSI
- Rathlin Island - Coast ASSI
- Rathlin Island - Kebble
- Rathsherry ASSI
- Runkerry ASSI
- Sandy Braes ASSI
- Scawt Hill ASSI
- Sheep Island ASSI
- Slieveanorra and Croaghan ASSI
- Slievenacloy ASSI
- South Woodburn Reservoir
- Straidkilly Wood ASSI
- Tardree Quarry ASSI
- The Gobbins ASSI
- The Maidens ASSI
- Tievebulliagh ASSI
- Torr Head ASSI
- Tow River Wood ASSI
- Waterloo Bay ASSI
- White Park Bay ASSI
- White Rocks, Portrush ASSI

== Notes ==
^{A} Rounded to one decimal place.
