= List of headlands of the United Kingdom =

The geology of the United Kingdom is such that there are many headlands along its coast. This incomplete list includes both major and minor headlands running clockwise around the coast from Berwick-upon-Tweed. The more significant ones have been tagged with an *. Headlands around the British coast are most commonly named as 'point', 'ness' or 'head' though 'trwyn' (nose), 'penrhyn' (peninsula) and 'pen' (head) are common in Wales as is 'rubha' in western Scotland.

Below is a list of headlands of the United Kingdom sorted by county. Names are derived from Ordnance Survey 1:63,360, 1:50,000 and 1:25,000 scale maps of Scotland, England, and Wales.

== England ==
From the Scottish border in the vicinity of Berwick-upon-Tweed clockwise around the English coast to the Welsh border at Chepstow:

=== Northumberland ===
- Hud's Head
- Lowmoor Point
- Tealhole Point
- Guile Point*
- Ross Point
- Kiln Point
- Budle Point
- Blackrocks Point
- Snook or North Sunderland Point*
- Red Brae or Dell Point
- Newton Point
- Castle Point
- Cullernose Point
- Seaton Point
- Pan Point
- Wellhaugh Point
- Snab Point
- Beacon Point
- Newbiggin Point
- Spital Point
- Crag Point
- Curry's Point
- Brown's Point
- Tynemouth North Point
- Sharpness Point
- Freestone Point

==== Lindisfarne ====
Listed clockwise from causeway:

- Snook Point
- Snipe Pint Dab
- Emmanuel Head*
- Castle Point*

=== County Durham ===
- Trow Point
- Lizard Point
- Souter Point
- Nose's Point
- Chourdon Point
- Hive Point
- Beacon Point*
- Shippersea Point
- Hartlepool Point
- Inscar Point

=== North Yorkshire ===
- Ness Point or North Cheek*
- Old Peak or South Cheek
- Blea Wyke Point
- Hundale Point
- Long Nab
- Cromer Point
- Scalby Ness
- White Nab
- Osgodby Point

=== East Riding of Yorkshire ===
- Filey Brigg*
- Flamborough Head*
- Spurn Head*
- Hawkin's Point

=== Lincolnshire ===
- Whitton Ness
- Skitter Ness
- Northcoates Point
- Donna Nook*
- Chapel Point
- Ingoldmells Point
- Gibraltar Point*

=== Norfolk ===
- St Edmund's Point
- Gore Point
- Scolt Head
- High Cape
- Blakeney Point*
- Marl Point
- Little Marl Point
- Winterton Ness
- Caister Point

=== Suffolk ===
- Lowestoft Ness* (most easterly point of England, Great Britain, UK)
- Benacre Ness
- Thorpe Ness
- Orford Ness*
- Landguard Point
- Fagbury Point
- Hall Point
- Collimer Point
- Bloody Point / Shotley Point
- Erwarton Ness
- Stutton Ness

=== Essex ===
- Wrabness Point
- Stone Point (west)
- Stone Point (east)
- The Naze*
- Sandy Point
- Chevaux de frise Point
- Colne Point
- Sandy Point
- St Osyth Stone Point
- Westmarsh Point
- Aldboro Point
- Shinglehead Point
- Mill Point
- Decoy Point
- Hilly Pool Point (Northey Island)
- Mundon Stone Point
- Sales Point
- Tip Head
- Holliwell Point
- Landsend Point
- Black Point
- Gardenness Point
- (multiple points on south shore of Crouch estuary)
- Wallasea Ness
- Blackedge Point
- Barling Ness
- Potton Point
- Smallgains Point
- Nase Point
- Foulness Point
- (multiple points on shore of Foulness)
- Haven Point
- Shoebury Ness*
- Canvey Point
- Leighbeck Point
- Deadman's Point
- Shellhaven Point
- Holehaven Point
- Coalhouse Point
- Tilbury Ness
- Stone Ness

=== Greater London ===
- Coldharbour Point
- Barking or False Point
- Margaret or Tripcock Ness
- Cross Ness
- Jenningtree Point
- Crayford Ness

=== Kent ===
- Broadness
- Lower Hope Point
- West Point
- Foreness Point
- White Ness
- North Foreland*
- Shell Ness
- Hope Point
- South Foreland*
- Copt Point
- Dungeness*

==== Isle of Sheppey ====
Listed clockwise from Kingsferry Bridge:

- Garrison Point
- Barton's Point
- Warden Point
- Shell Ness
- Spitend Point

=== East Sussex ===
- Langney Point
- Beachy Head*

=== West Sussex ===
- Selsey Bill*
- East Head
- Cobnor Point
- Longmere Point
- Marker Point

=== Hampshire ===
- Gilkicker Point
- Browndown Point
- Calshot Spit
- Stone Point
- Needs Ore Point
- Hurst Castle Spit

==== Hayling Island ====
- Black Point
- Eastoke Point

=== Isle of Wight ===
Listed clockwise from East Cowes

- Old Castle Point
- Puckpool Point
- Nettlestone Point
- Horestone Point
- Node's Point
- Bembridge Point
- Foreland
- Dunnose
- Woody Point
- Binnel Point
- St. Catherine's Point*
- Atherfield Point
- Hanover Point
- New Ditch Point
- The Needles*
- Hatherwood Point
- Warden Point
- Sconce Point
- Hamstead Point
- Egypt Point

=== Dorset ===
- Hengistbury Head*
- North Haven Point
- South Haven Point
- The Foreland or Handfast Point*
- Ballard Point
- Peveril Point*
- Durlston Head*
- Anvil Point
- St Aldhelm's Point or St Alban's Head
- Egmont Point
- Worbarrow Tout
- Bat's Head
- White Nothe
- Redcliff Point
- Portland Bill or Bill of Portland*
- Golden Cap

=== South Devon ===
- Beer Head
- Straight Point
- Orcombe Point
- Hope's Nose
- Berry Head
- Sharkham Point
- Scabbacombe Head
- Start Point
- Prawle Point
- Gammon Head
- Bolt Head
- Bolt Tail
- Beacon Point
- Stoke Point
- Gara Point
- Wembury Point

=== Cornwall ===
- Penlee Point
- Rame Head
- Gribbin Head
- Dodman Point
- Nare Head
- Zone Point
- Pendennis Point
- Rosemullion Head
- Manacle Point
- Lizard Point
- Land's End
- Cape Cornwall
- Zennor Head
- St Ives Head
- Godrevy Point
- St Agnes Head
- Ligger Point
- Penhale Point
- Kelsey Head
- Towan Head
- Trevose Head
- Pentire Point
- Tintagel Head
- Cambeak
- Pencarrow Point
- Lower Sharpnose Point
- Higher Sharpnose Point

=== North Devon ===
- Hartland Point
- Baggy Point
- Morte Point
- Bull Point
- Foreland Point

=== Somerset ===
- Hurlstone Point
- Brean Down
- Worlebury Hill
- Sand Point

=== Gloucestershire ===
- Beachley

== Wales ==
From the English border at Chepstow clockwise around the Welsh coast to the English border near Chester:

=== Monmouthshire ===
- Red Cliff
- Black Rock
- Sudbrook Point
- Gold Cliff

=== Flat Holm (Cardiff) ===
From ferry landing clockwise around coast:

- Jackdaw Point
- Lighthouse Point
- Bottlewell Point
- North West Point
- Castle Point

=== Glamorganshire ===
- Penarth Head*
- Lavernock Point*
- East Point (Sully Island)
- West Point (Sully Island)
- Hayes Point
- Nell's Point
- Friar's Point
- Storehouse Point
- Cold Knap Point
- Rhoose Point* (competing with Breaksea Point for most southerly point of mainland Wales)
- Watch House Point
- Breaksea Point (competing with Rhoose Point for most southerly point of mainland Wales)
- Summerhouse Point
- Stout Point
- Pigeon Point
- Col-huw Point
- St Donat's Point
- Nash Point*
- Trwyn y Witch*
- Trwyn y March
- Newton Point
- Rhych Point
- Porthcawl Point
- Irongate Point
- Hutchwns Point
- Sker Point
- Witford Point

==== Gower ====
- Mumbles Head*
- Rams Tor
- Snaple Point
- Whiteshell Point
- Pwlldu Point
- Pwlldu Head
- Great Tor
- Little Tor
- Oxwich Point
- Port-Eynon Point
- Tears Point
- Worms Head*
- Minor Point
- Foxhole Point
- Twlc Point
- Whiteford Point
- Salthouse Point
- Dalton's Point

=== Carmarthenshire ===
- Tywyn Point
- Ferry Point
- Wharley Point
- Ginst Point
- Gilman Point
- Ragwen Point
- Telpyn Point

=== Pembrokeshire ===
==== South coast ====
From the Carmarthenshire border west to the Angle peninsula:

- Coppet Hall Point
- Monkstone Point
- Bowman's Point
- Second Point
- First Point
- Giltar Point
- Valleyfield Top
- Proud Giltar
- Lydstep Point*
- Old Castle Head
- Priest's Nose
- East Moor Cliff
- West Moor Cliff
- Trewent Point
- Greenala Point
- Stackpole Head
- Saddle Point
- Long Matthew Point
- St Govan's Head*
- Saddle Head
- Mewsford Point
- Moody Nose
- Linney Head*
- Great Furzenip
- Little Furzenip
- Sheepland
- Ratland
- Thornland

==== Caldey Island ====
From ferry landing clockwise around coast:

- Den Point
- Caldey Point
- Small Ord Point
- Chapel Point
- West Beacon Point
- Eel Point

==== Milford Haven coast ====
From the Angle peninsula to the Dale peninsula:

- Angle Point
- Sawdern Point
- Popton Point
- Pennar Point
- Hobbs Point
- Cosheston Point
- Barnlake Point
- Wear Point
- Hakin Point
- South Hook Point
- Little Castle Head
- Chester Point
- Great Castle Head
- Rook's Nest Point
- Longberry Point
- Watch House Point
- Musselwick Point
- Dale Point
- Watwick Point
- West Blockhouse Point

==== West coast ====
From St Ann's Head around Marloes peninsula and St Bride's Bay to St David's Head:

- St Ann's Head*
- Little Castle Point
- Short Point
- Long Point
- Iron Point
- Great Castle Head
- Hooper's Point
- Pitting Gales Point
- Wooltack Point*
- Haven Point
- High Point
- Tower Point
- The Nab Head
- Castle Head
- Ticklas Point
- Borough Head
- The Point
- Black Point
- Rickets Head
- Maidenhall Point
- Sibbernock Point
- Dinas Fach
- Pen Dinas
- Penrhyn
- Carreg y Barcud
- Penpleidia
- Pen y Cyfrwy
- Trwyn Cynddeiriog
- Pen Pedol
- Pen Dal-aderyn
- Penmaen melyn
- Penrhyn Dalar
- Point St John
- Trwynhwrddyn
- Penlledwen

==== Skokholm Island ====
From ferry landing clockwise around coast:

- Frank's Point
- Quarry Point
- Long Nose
- Little Bay Point
- Long Point

==== Skomer Island ====
From ferry landing clockwise around coast:

- Skomer Point

==== Ramsey Island coast ====
From ferry landing clockwise around coast:

- Penrhyn Twll
- Trwynmynachdy
- Trwyn yr Allt
- Trwyn Bendro
- Trwynllundain
- Trwyn-drain-du
- Trwyn-Siôn-Owen
- Trwyn Ogof Hen

==== North coast ====
From St David's Head east to the Ceredigion border:

- St David's Head*
- Trwyn-llwyd
- Penllechwen
- Trwyn Porth-coch
- Penrhyn Halen
- Penrhyn Ffynnon-las
- Trwyn Dduallt
- Penclegyr
- Ynys Gwair
- Trwyn Aber-pwll
- Trwyncastell
- Pen Porth Egr
- Penclegyr
- Trwyn Elen
- Trwyn Llwyd
- Pen Castell-coch
- Trwyn Llwynog
- Penmorfa
- Pen Deudraeth
- Carreg Golchfa
- Llech Dafad
- Trwyn Llwyd
- Penbwchdy
- Dinas Mawr
- Penrhyn By
- Pen Brush
- Strumble Head/Pen-Caer*
- Trwyn Llwyd
- Pen Capel Degan
- Pen Globa
- Trwyn Llwyd
- Carregwastad Point*
- Penfathach
- Y Penrhyn
- Penanglas
- Crincoed Point
- Pen-cw
- Saddle Point
- Castle Point
- Penrhyn Ychen
- Penrhyn Mawr
- Pen Castell
- Pen Sidan
- Dinas Head*
- Trwyn Isaac
- Penrhyn y Fforest
- Pen-y-bâl
- Pen Cafnau
- Trwyn y Bwa
- Slipping
- Carreg Wylan
- Pen yr Afr
- Carreg Lion
- Cemaes Head*
- Trwyn yr Olchfa
- Trwyn Careg-ddu
- Cafnau Pen Sidan
- Penrhyn Erw-goch

=== Ceredigion ===
- Pen yr Ergyd
- Craig y Gwbert
- Pen Tew
- Pen yr Hwbyn
- Pencestyll
- Pen-Peles
- Pencribach
- Pen Traeth-bâch
- Pen-rhip
- Trwyn Crou
- New Quay Head
- Pen-y-Gloyn
- Trwyn Pellaf

=== Gwynedd ===
==== Cardigan Bay coast ====
- Penrhyn Cregyn
- Harlech Point
- Trwynypenrhyn
- Ynys Cyngar
- Penychain
- Carreg y Defaid
- Trwyn Llanbedrog
- Penbennar
- Penrhyn Du
- Trwyn yr Wylfa
- Trwyn Llech-y-doll
- Trwyn Cilan
- Trwyn y Fulfran
- Trwyn Carreg-y-tir
- Trwyn y Ffosle
- Trwyn Talfarach
- Trwyn y Penrhyn
- Pen y Cil
- Trwyn Bychestyn
- Trwyn y Gwyddel
- Trwyn Maen Melyn

==== North coast ====
- Braich y Pwll
- Braich y Noddfa
- Braich Anelog
- Dinas Bach
- Trwyn Glas
- Dinas
- Trwyn Garreg-lwyd
- Penrhyn Mawr
- Penrhyn Colmon
- Penrhyn Melyn
- Penrhyn Cwmistir
- Trwyn Porth Dinllaen
- Penrhyn Nefyn
- Penrhyn Bodeilas
- Penrhyn Glas
- Trwyn y Gorlech
- Trwyn y Tâl
- Trwyn Maen Dylan
- Fort Belan Point

=== Anglesey ===
Listed clockwise from Menai Bridge.

==== West coast ====
- Abermenai Point
- Llanddwyn Island
- Pen-y-parc
- Trwyn y Wylan
- Trwyn Ifan
- Trwyn Tyllog
- Trwyn Euphrates
- Braich Parlwr
- Penrhyn-hwlad
- Trwyn Guter-fudr
- Trwyn y Crewyn
- Trwyn Cerrigyreryr

==== Most Holy Island ====
Clockwise from Four Mile Bridge:

- Rhoscolyn Head
- Ravens Point
- Penrhyn Mawr

==== North coast ====
- Carmel Head* (Trwyn y Gader)
- Trwyn Cemlyn
- Trwyn Pencarreg
- Trwyn y Galen-ddu
- Wylfa Head
- Trywn y Penrhyn
- Trwyn y Parc
- Llanbadrig Point
- Llanlleiana Head
- Torllwyn
- Trwyn Llech
- Trwynbychan
- Trwyn Myn
- Trwyn Costog
- Trwyn Penwaig
- Point Lynas* (Trwyn Eilian)

==== East coast ====
- Trwyn Du
- Penrhyn Glas
- Trwyn Cwmrwd
- Trwyn Porth-y-môr
- Trwyn Gribin
- Trwyn Grupyl
- Trwyn Melyn
- Penrhyn y Gell
- Penrhyn
- Trwyn Dwlban
- Trwyn Dinmor
- Trwyn Penmon
- Trwyn y Penrhyn
- Gallows Point

=== Conwy ===
- Penmaenmawr
- Penamen-bach Point
- Trwyn y Gogarth
- Great Orme's Head*
- Pen-trwyn
- Little Ormes Head
- Trwyn y Fuwch
- Rhos Point

=== Flintshire ===
- Point of Ayr*

== Northwest England ==
=== Cheshire ===
- Hilbre Point
- Perch Rock

=== Lancashire ===
- Rossall Point
- Sunderland Point
- Red Nab
- Scalestones Point

=== Cumbria ===
- Blackstone Point
- Holme Island
- Blawith Point
- Humphrey Head Point
- Cowpren Point
- Lenibrick Point
- Park Head
- Hazelhurst Point
- Mearness Point
- Legbarrow Point
- Nab Point
- Ashes Point
- Hammerside Point
- Maskel Point
- Westfield Point
- Lowsy Point
- Hodbarrow Point
- Haverigg Point
- Drigg Point
- St Bees Head
- Redness Point
- Cunning Point

== Scotland ==
=== Dumfries-shire ===
- Redkirk Point
- Torduff Point
- Barnkirk Point
- Scar Point

=== Kirkcudbrightshire ===
- Airds Point
- Hogus Point
- Borron Point
- Southerness Point
- Craigneuk Point
- Castlehill Point
- Isle Point
- Almorness Point
- Girvellan Point
- Torr Point
- Balcary Point
- Airds Point
- Castle Muir Point
- Abbey Head
- Netherlaw Point
- Gipsy Point
- Torrs Point
- Point of the Isle
- Castledykes Point
- Gibbhill Point
- Bar Point
- Manor Point
- Mull Point
- Dunrod Point
- Point of Green
- Borness Point
- Ringdoo Point
- Meggerland Point
- Corseyard Point
- Point of the Bar
- Carrick Point
- Craigmore Point
- Rough Point (south)
- Rough Point (north)
- Ringdoo Point
- Ravenshall Point

=== Wigtownshire ===
- Innerwell Point
- Port McGean Point
- Castle Head
- Eggerness Point
- Dumbie Point
- Sliddery Point
- Cruggleton Point
- Palmallet Point
- Shaddock Point
- Cairn Head
- Steinhead Point
- Stein Head
- Isle Head
- Broom Point
- Burrow Head
- Point of Cairndoon
- Point of Lag
- Barsalloch Point
- Saltpan Point
- Clone Point
- Barr Point
- Milton Point
- Slackmore Point
- Kilfillan Point
- Ringdoo Point
- Purdie's Point
- Blagowan Point
- Myroch Point
- Terally Point
- Grennan Point
- Cailiness Point
- Mull of Galloway
- Carrickcarlin Point
- Lythe Head

=== Ayrshire ===
- Bennane Head

=== Argyllshire ===
Mainland:

- Mull of Kintyre

Islay

- The Oa

=== Inverness-shire ===
Isle of Harris:

- Eilean Glas, Scalpay

North Uist:

- Weavers Point
- Aird an Rùnair

South Uist:

- Ushenish

Barra Isles

- Barra Head

Isle of Skye:

- Neist Point
- Waternish

=== Ross and Cromarty ===
Mainland West Coast:

- Corrachadh Mòr
- Ardnamurchan Point
- Redpoint
- Rua Reidh Lighthouse

Isle of Lewis:

- Butt of Lewis
- Tiumpan Head

=== Sutherland ===
- Stoer Head
- Cape Wrath
- Faraid Head

=== Caithness ===
- Dunnet Head
- Holborn Head
- Duncansby Head

=== Ross and Cromarty ===
Mainland East Coast:

- Tarbat Ness

=== Aberdeenshire ===
- Kinnaird Head
- Rattray Head
- Keith Inch
- Peterhead
- Hackley Head
- Hare Ness
- Downie Point
- Bowdun Head
- Dunnottar Castle
- Milton Ness

=== Fife ===
- Fife Ness

=== Berwickshire ===
- Siccar Point
- St Abb's Head

=== Orkney ===
Westray:

- Rapness

South Ronaldsay:

- Grim Ness

Orkney Mainland

- Point of Hellia
- Point of Ayre, Orkney

=== Shetland ===
Unst:

- Hermaness

Shetland Mainland:

- Esha Ness
- Sumburgh Head

== Northern Ireland ==
=== County Londonderry ===
- Culmore Point
- Magilligan Point*
- Portstewart Point
- Rinagree Point

=== County Antrim ===
- Ramore Head
- Runkerry Point
- Giants Causeway*
- Benbane Head*
- Bengore Head
- Contham Head
- Geeraagh Point
- Gid Point
- Larry Bane Head
- Kinbane or White Head
- Benmore or Fair Head* (northernmost point of Northern Ireland)
- Drumnakill Point
- Ruebane Point
- Torr Head
- Crockan Point
- Runabay Head
- Tornamoney Point
- Limerick Point
- Garron Point*
- Hunter's Point
- Straidkilly Point
- Park Head
- Whitebay Point
- Ballygalley Head
- Curran Point
- Dalaradia Point
- Barney's Point
- Ferris Point
- Barr's Point
- Skernaghan Point
- Black Head
- White Head
- Cloghan Point
- Macedon Point

=== County Down ===
- Grey Point
- Swineley Point
- Wilsons Point
- Lukes Point
- Ballymacormick Point
- Sheep Point
- Orlock Point
- Rogers Point
- Foreland Point
- Dormans Point
- Robbys Point
- James Point
- Ballyferis Point
- Burr Point* (easternmost point of mainland of Northern Ireland)
- Ringboy Point
- Slanes Point
- Kearney Point
- Ballyquintin Point
- Carrstown Point
- Ringburr Point (in Strangford Lough)
- Kilclief Point
- Mullog Point
- Killard Point
- Cloghan Head
- Phennick Point
- Ringfad Point
- Crane Point
- Curlew Point
- Corbet Head
- St John's Point
- Corely Point
- Rathmullan Point
- Ringsallin Point
- Dunmore Head
- Russells Point
- Murphy's Point
- Danes' Bridge Point
- Ballykeel Point
- Lee Stone Point
- Crawfords Point
- Nicholsons Point
- Cranfield Point* (southernmost point of Northern Ireland)
- Soldiers Point
- Greencastle Point
- Killowen Point
- Dobbin's Point
- Warrenpoint

== See also ==
- List of spits of the United Kingdom
- Coastal landforms of Ireland
