= Coastal Zone at Portrush =

Visitor centre, County Antrim, Northern Ireland

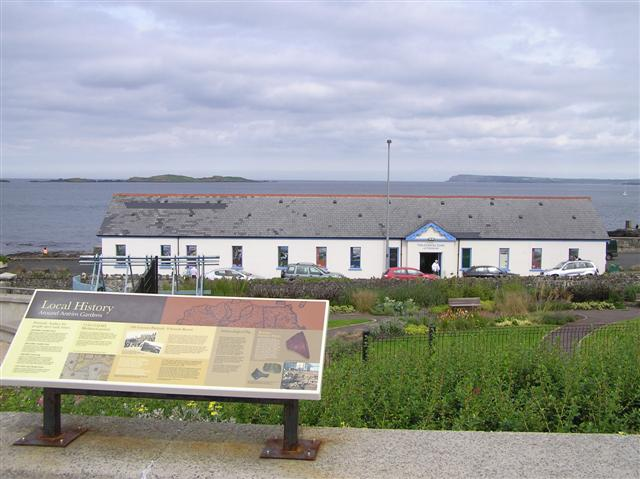
View of the Coastal Zone building.

Coastal Zone at Portrush (formerly the Portrush Countryside Centre) is a visitor centre at Portrush, County Antrim, Northern Ireland.

The visitor centre has an exhibition space that covers the natural history, environment, and local history of the area. It is operated by the Department of Agriculture, Environment and Rural Affairs (DAERA). It is directly on the coast, looking out to the Skerries. There is a nature reserve nearby.

== See also ==
- Ramore Head, an Area of Special Scientific Interest
