= Pulpit Rock, Portland =

Coastal feature at Portland Bill, Dorset, England

Coordinates: 50°30′51.3″N 2°27′34.1″W

Pulpit Rock

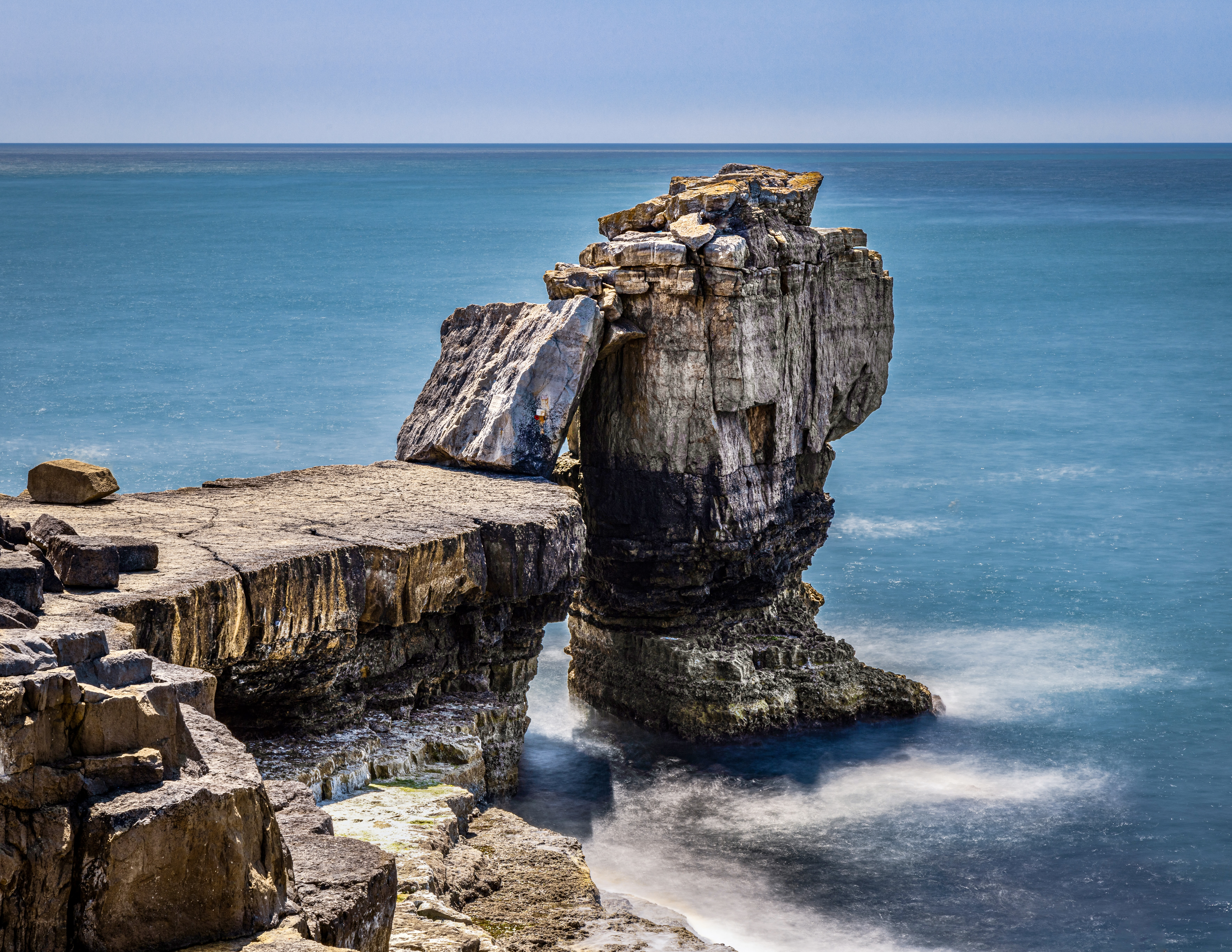
from the northeast

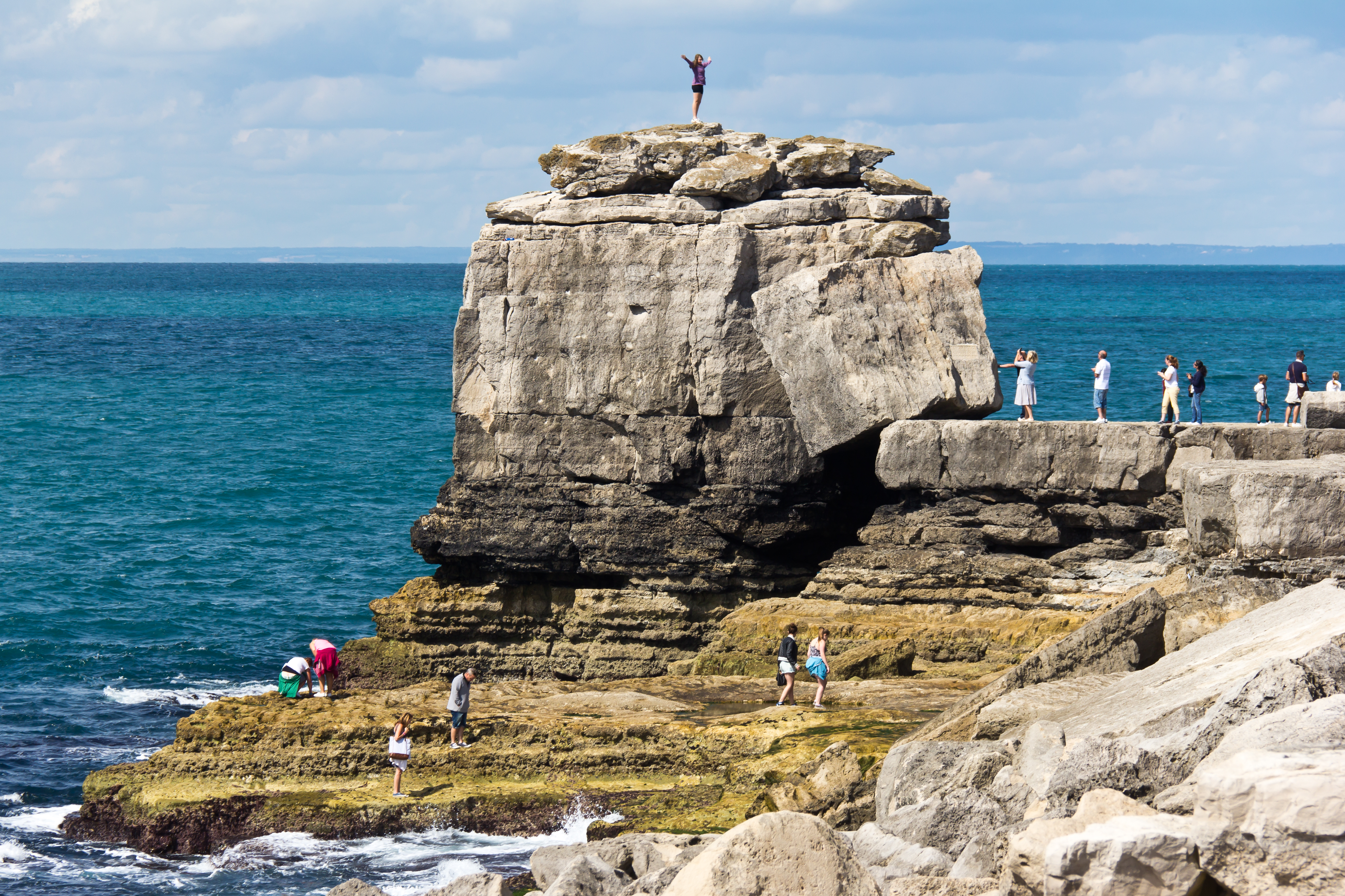
from the southeast

Pulpit Rock is a coastal feature at Portland Bill, the southern tip of the Isle of Portland, Dorset, England. Intended to have the appearance of an open bible leaning on a pulpit, Pulpit Rock was formed in the 1870s after a natural arch was cut away by quarrymen at Bill Quarry, and the leaning slab was added. As a quarrying relic, the rock is similar to that of Nicodemus Knob, another quarrying landmark on the island.

Pulpit Rock has become a popular tourist attraction on the island and is often photographed. Despite the danger, for many decades it has been a popular place for tombstoning. Pulpit Rock is also a popular point for wrasse anglers. The British record Ballan wrasse was caught there in 1998 by Pete Hegg.

The geological succession up from sea level is: Portland Cherty Series (up to the level of the neighbouring quarried platform), then Portland Freestone (the oolitic limestone quarried inland of Pulpit Rock), then a cap of thin-bedded limestones which are part of the basal Purbeck Formation.

== See also ==
- List of rock formations in the United Kingdom
- Tar Rocks
