= Waterloo Bay =

Area of foreshore in Larne, Northern Ireland

- Mercia Mudstone Group, Lias Group
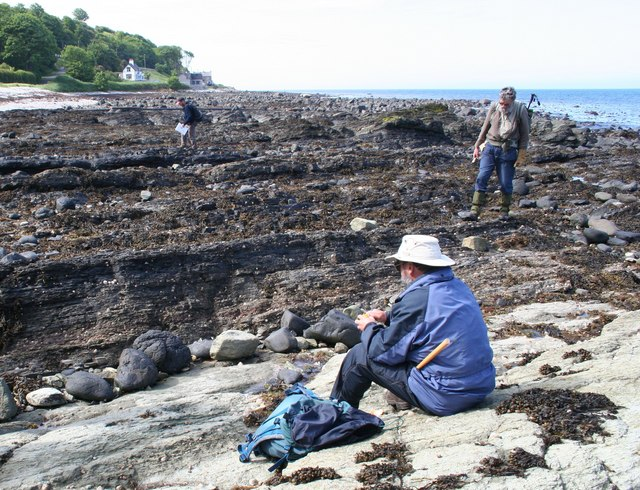
- Tilted mudstones at Waterloo Bay, Larne

- Location in Northern Ireland
- Coordinates: 54°51′07″N 5°49′48″W
- Grid position: D408037
- Location: County Antrim, Northern Ireland
- Age: Jurassic, Triassic
- Elevation: 0 m
- Topo map: OSNI Discoverer 9

Waterloo Bay is an area of foreshore in Larne on the east coast of County Antrim, Northern Ireland. It is of particular interest to geologists because it provides a clear, complete and accessible example of the sequences from Upper Triassic to Lower Jurassic, when the rock types changed from land to marine.

== Geology ==
=== Early investigation ===
Joseph Ellison Portlock studied the Triassic and Jurassic rocks of Ireland in 1843 as part of his engagement by Ordnance Survey Ireland.

In 1864 Ralph Tate made an investigation of the Triassic rocks of County Antrim, which he reported to the Geological Society of London.

=== Status and significance ===
Because the location provides an unusually clear, complete and accessible example of the sequences from Upper Triassic to Lower Jurassic, when the rock types changed from land to marine, Waterloo Bay was designated an Area of Special Scientific Interest for its geological importance in 1995.

In 2007, it was a candidate for Global Boundary Stratotype Section and Point (also known as a GSSP, or 'golden spike') to mark the base of the Jurassic system and Hettangian stage. although the Kujoch in Austria was chosen instead.

== The "Larne Sea Dragon" ==
In 1999, an ichthyosaur, also popularly known as the 'Larne Sea Dragon' or 'Minnis Monster' was found in the Langport Member strata by Brian McGee. Remains were found of the backbone and rib cage, scattered pieces of the front limbs, the lower jaw, and several teeth. These were uncovered by fossil preparator Andy Cowap and put on display in the Ulster Museum.

From 2007-9, while the Ulster Museum was undergoing refurbishment, the ichthyosaur was exhibited in Larne Tourist Information Centre.

== Public right of way ==
The promenade, a footpath between the foreshore and the low cliffs at Waterloo, is a public right of way.

== Gallery ==
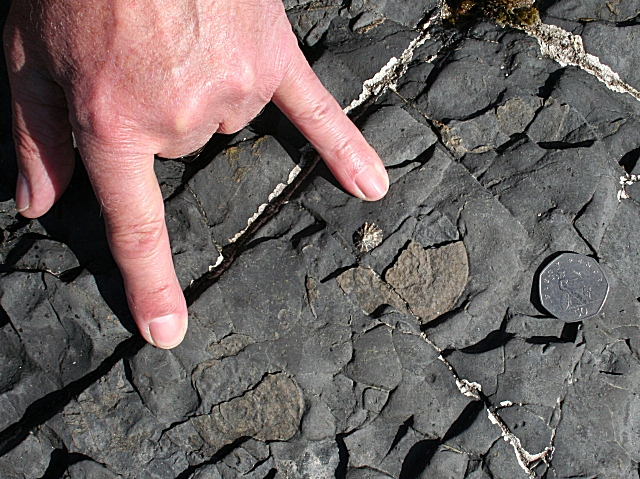
Ammonites are abundant in the mudstone that marks the Jurassic boundary - the primary marker at this site is the ammonite Psiloceras planorbis

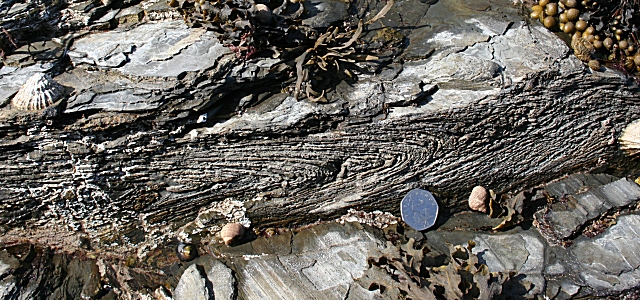
A slump fold in the Triassic Mercia Mudstone Group

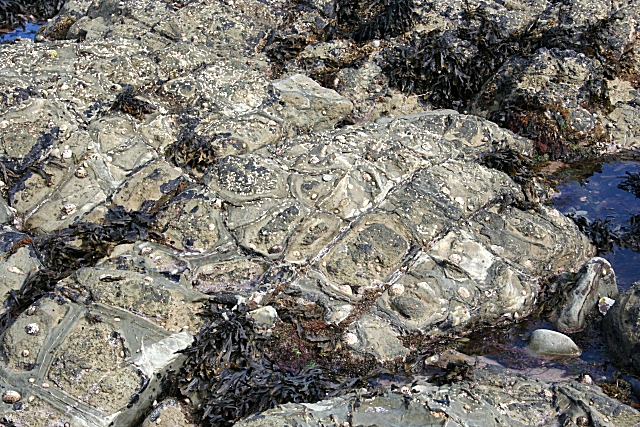
Synaeresis cracks in the mudstone

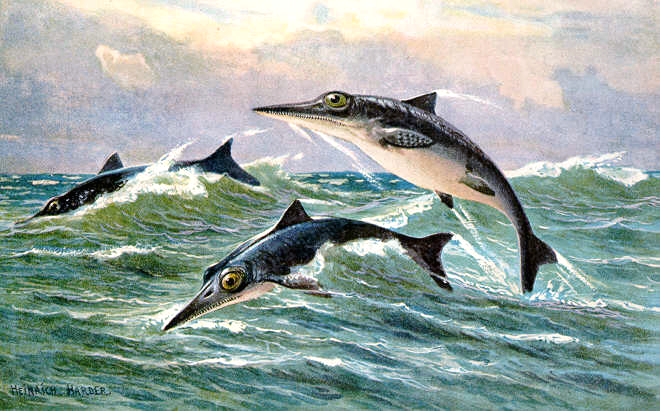
The most complete example of an ichthyosaur in Northern Ireland was discovered at Waterloo Bay, Larne

== See also ==
- Geology of Northern Ireland
- List of rock formations in the United Kingdom
