= Ramore Head =

Headland in Northern Ireland

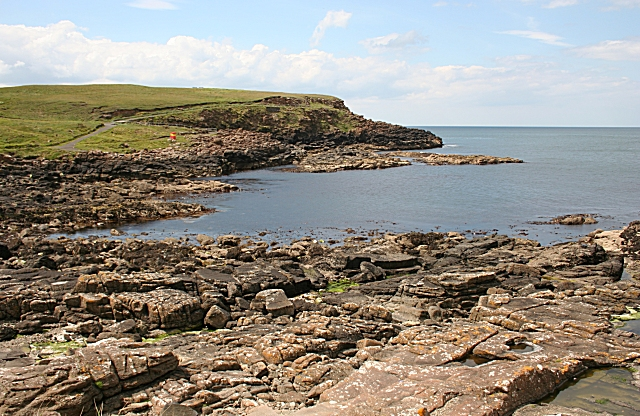
Ramore Head.

Ramore Head (Irish: Ceann na Rátha Móire) is a rocky headland in Portrush, County Antrim, Northern Ireland.

== Overview ==
The headland, pointing north-northwest, is the tip of the peninsula on which the town of Portrush lies. The area of the headland is an Area of Special Scientific Interest. The rocks here are dolerite, an intrusive igneous rock formed from volcanic activity. There is a footpath around the headland, with grassland surrounding the path. There are also recreation grounds, including tennis courts and lawn bowls, and a car park.

Out at sea are a string of rocky islands known as the Skerries, the remains of past volcanic activity. These are also part of the Area of Special Scientific Interest.

== Gallery ==
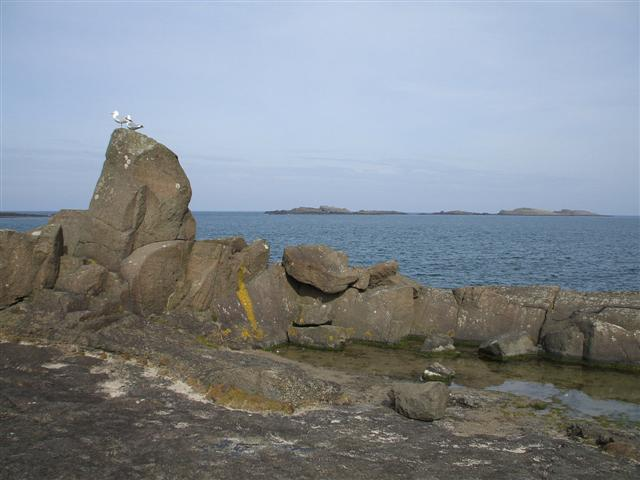
Ramore Head, looking towards the Skerries.

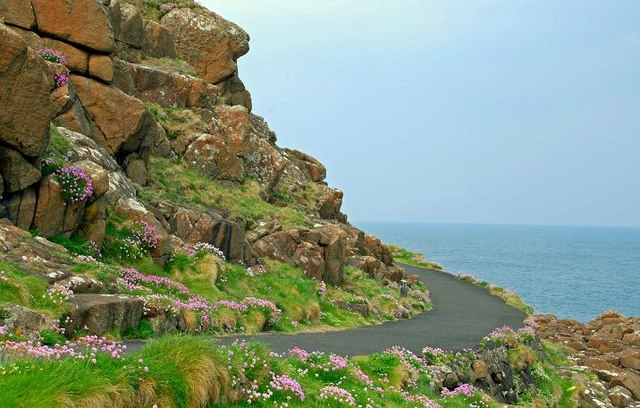
Path at Ramore Head.

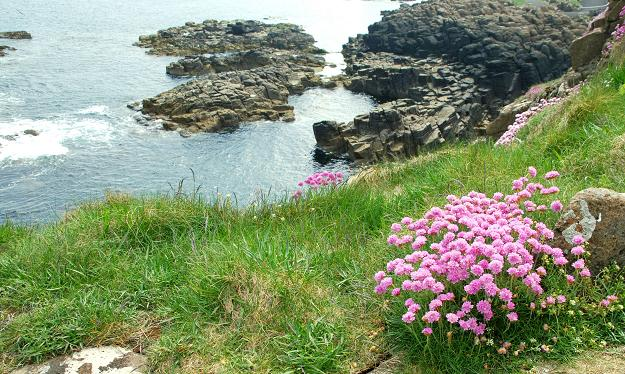
Thrift at Ramore Head.

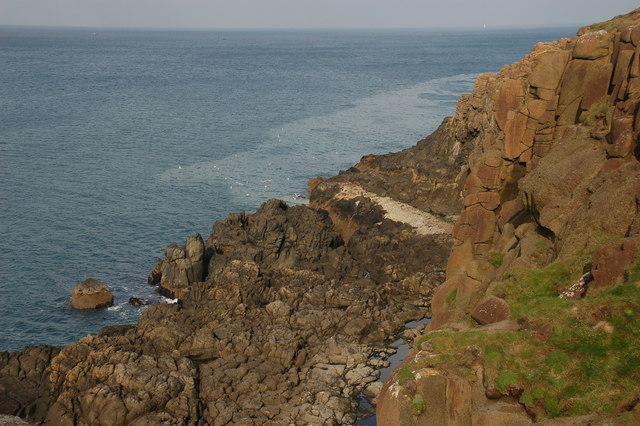
The coast at Ramore Head.

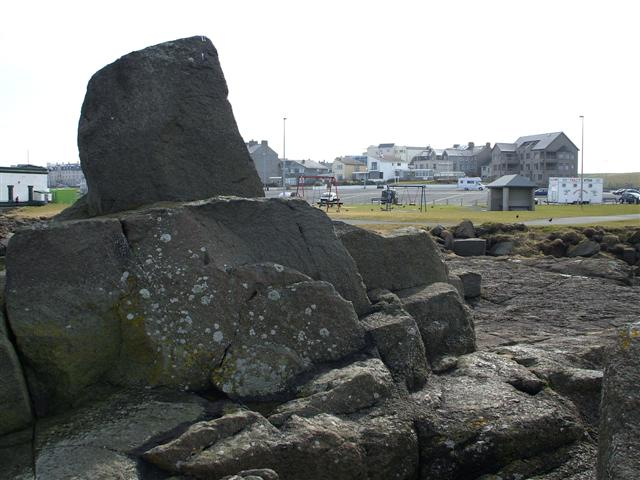
Rock at Ramore Head, looking towards the car park.

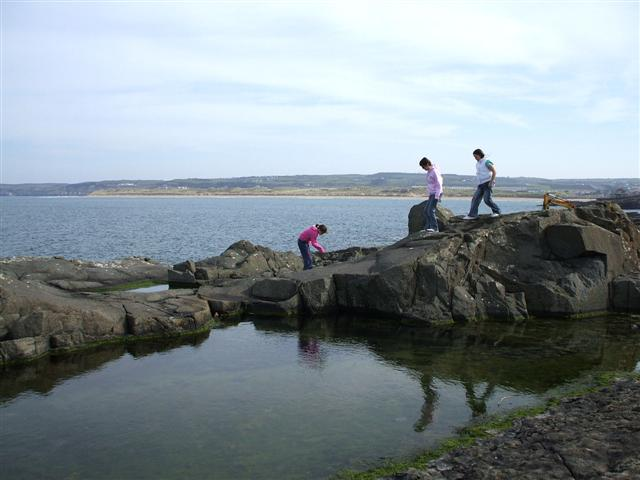
Rock pool at Ramore Head.

== See also ==
- Coastal landforms of Ireland
- Coastal Zone at Portrush
- List of Areas of Special Scientific Interest in County Antrim
- List of headlands of the United Kingdom
