= Tar Rocks =

Rock formation on the Dorset coast, England

Coordinates: 50°33′02.4″N 2°27′10.88″W

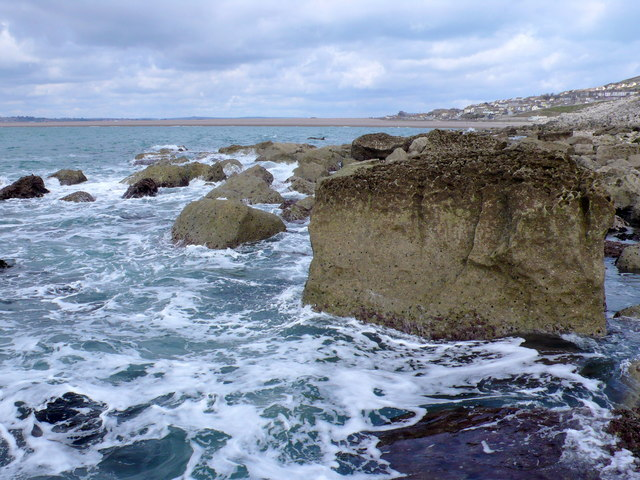
Tar Rocks at low tide with the Chesil Beach in the background.

Tar Rocks are coastal rocks on the west side of the Isle of Portland, Dorset, England. The rocks become mostly covered at high tide.

== See also ==
- List of rock formations in the United Kingdom
- Pulpit Rock (Isle of Portland)

== Gallery ==
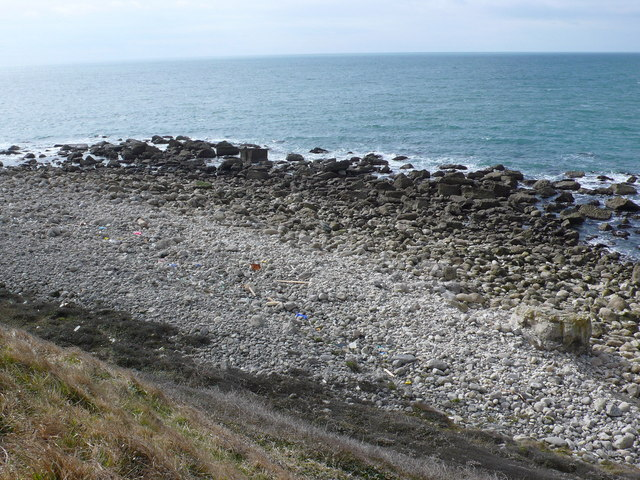
Tar Rocks from above at low tide.

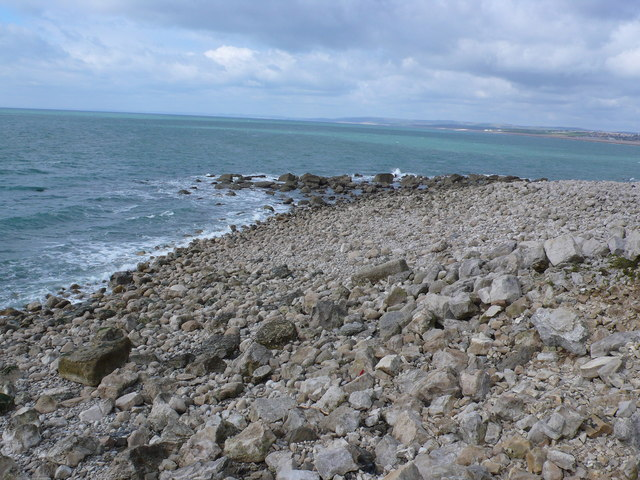
Tar Rocks from the south at low tide.
