= Portrush Town Hall =

Municipal Building in Portrush, Northern Ireland

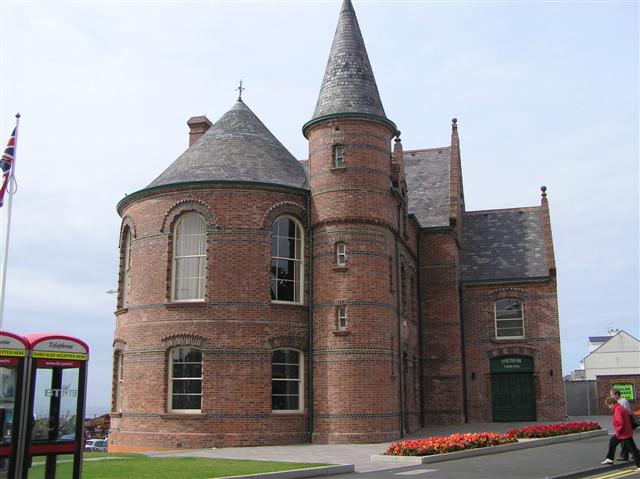
- Old Town Hall

- Shown in Northern Ireland
- 55.2047°N 6.6531°W
- Location: Mark Street, Portrush

History
- Built: 1872

Site notes
- Architect: Lanyon, Lynn and Lanyon
- Architectural style: Scottish baronial style

Listed Building – Grade B+
- Official name: Town Hall, Kerr Street, Portrush, County Antrim
- Designated: 22 June 1977
- Reference no.: HB 03/10/001

Portrush Town Hall is a municipal structure in Mark Street, Portrush, County Antrim, Northern Ireland. The structure, which is used as an events venue, is a Grade B+ listed building.

== History ==
The building was commissioned by a group of local businessmen who decided to form a company known as the "Portrush Town Hall and Assembly Rooms Company" to finance and erect a town hall for the town: the principal landowner in the area, William Randal McDonnell, 6th Earl of Antrim, whose seat was at Glenarm Castle, leased their selected site to them at an annual rental of £15 (equivalent to £1,467 in 2025).

The new building was designed by Lanyon, Lynn and Lanyon in the Scottish baronial style, built by Thomas Stewart Dickson of Larne in red brick at a cost of £2,300 and was officially opened on 12 August 1872. The design involved an asymmetrical main frontage facing southeast towards the corner of Kerr Street and Mark Street; the left-hand section featured a curved wall with five segmentally headed windows with voussoirs on the ground floor, five round headed windows with voussoirs on the first floor and a conical roof above. The centre section took the form of a three-story turret with lancet windows on each floor and a series of trefoils under the eaves. The right-hand section was narrow and blind, while the side elevations of the building were fenestrated in a similar style but featured stepped gables and finials. Internally, the principal rooms were the assembly room, which had a capacity of 500 people, and a distinctive curved reading room.

The building was used as an events venue from an early stage and, as well as being the local venue for petty session hearings, it saw many concerts and the songwriter, Percy French, was among many performers held there in the late 19th century. Following significant population growth, largely associated with the seaside tourism industry, Portrush elected town commissioners in December 1892. The commissioners met in the town hall and, after the area became an urban district in 1899, the new council also met there. The council acquired the freehold of the town hall from the earl in 1916.

Following the truce of July 1921 between the Irish Republican Army and the UK Government, the first Lord Chief Justice of Northern Ireland, Denis Henry, was sworn in by the last Lord Chancellor of Ireland, Sir John Ross, in the town hall in August 2021. A war memorial, which was designed by Frank Ransom in the form of a bronze statue of victory mounted on a pedestal and which was intended to commemorate the lives of local service personnel who had died in the First World War, was unveiled in front of the town hall in the presence of Lady Macnaghten of Dundarave House on 11 November 1922.

In 1930, the building was extended, in a similar style, to the north and to the northeast by a contractor from Ballymoney, Hugh Taggart, at a cost of £4,000. The works were carried out to a design by the town surveyor, Albert Clarke: the northeast extension incorporated a new segmentally headed doorway with voussoirs, facing southeast, which was flanked by colonettes and augmented with the words "Portrush Town Hall" painted in the tympanum. In the 1960s, further works were carried to convert the reading room into a council chamber. The building continued to serve as the meeting place of the urban district council for much of the 20th century, but ceased to be the local seat of government after the enlarged Coleraine Borough Council was formed in 1973. The building continued to be used as an events venue until 1997, when the council decided it was surplus to requirements and its proposals for the demolition of the building were considered but rejected by the Planning Appeals Commission.

An extensive programme of restoration works costing £1.6 million, managed by Hearth Historic Buildings Trust, financed by the Heritage Lottery Fund and carried out by McCloskey & O'Kane of Limavady to a design by Consarc, was completed in 2005. Following the re-opening of the building, the reading room was named the Girvan room to commemorate one of the proponents of the restoration, Paul Girvan. The project was recognised by the Royal Institute of British Architects with a Conservation Award in 2006. The building then resumed its role as an events venue and the comedian, Shane Todd, presented an episode of the BBC New Comedy Award programme in the town hall in November 2021.
