= Nicodemus Knob =

Coordinates: 50.5577°N 2.4278°W

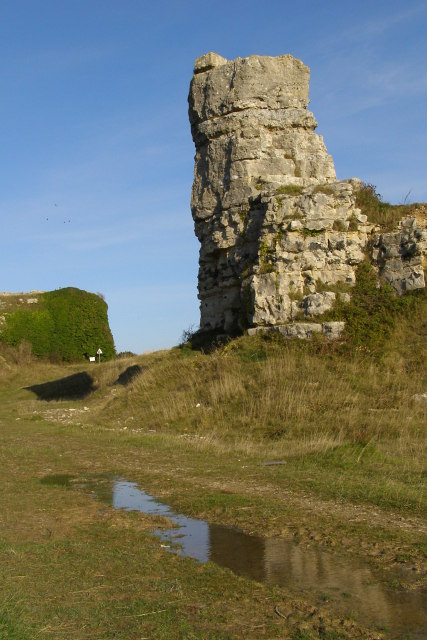
Nicodemus Knob

Nicodemus Knob is a 9 m (30 ft) pillar of Portland stone, left as a landmark and quarrying relic at East Cliff on the Isle of Portland, Dorset, England. A similar artificial pillar formed through quarrying is Pulpit Rock at Portland Bill.

== History ==
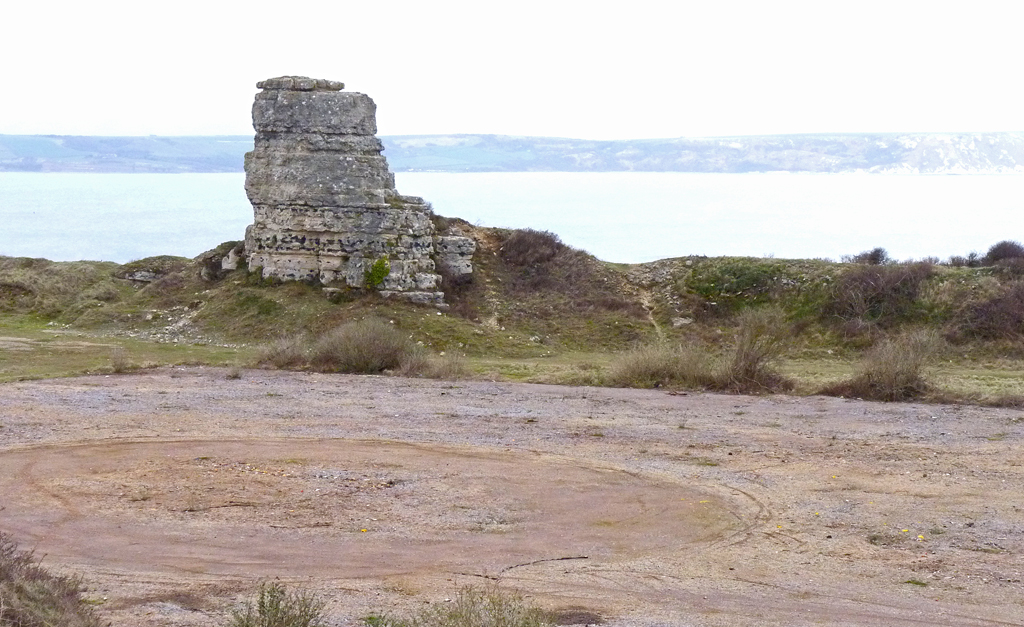
Nicodemus Knob and the surrounding area.

Nicodemus Knob was left as a pillar within the former Admiralty Quarries, which provided stone for the breakwaters of Portland Harbour between 1849-72. It marks the extent to which the convicts excavated stone from the quarries; some six million tonnes of stone was taken from the area, using convict labour from the nearby Portland Convict Establishment.

The stack's intended purpose is uncertain. Some believe that it was left as a seamark, while other suggest it was a memorial to the efforts of those who moved so much stone from the site, or that it was simply to highlight the amount of stone quarried, thereby recording the natural ground level. Near to Nicodemus Knob are a number of small fields, enclosed by drystone walls. Adjacent to the stack are some flat rectangular areas once used by Portland Port Ltd as an industrial storage site. The area is noted as being "botanically rich", while migrant birds are frequently spotted in the area.
