= List of rock formations in the United Kingdom =

This is a selected list of notable, natural landscape features in England, Scotland, Wales and Northern Ireland. It includes isolated, scenic, or spectacular surface rock outcrops. These formations are usually the result of weathering and erosion sculpting the existing rock. For the stratigraphic term 'formation' applied by geologists to rock sequences, see Formation (stratigraphy).

== England ==
- Avon Gorge, Bristol
- Brimham Rocks, Nidderdale, Yorkshire
- Cheddar Gorge and Cave, Somerset
- Cheesewring, Bodmin Moor, Cornwall
- Dovedale, Derbyshire
- Durdle Door, Dorset
- Ebbor Gorge, Somerset
- Hunstanton cliffs, Norfolk
- Lathkill Dale, Derbyshire
- Lydford Gorge, Devon
- The Needles, Isle of Wight
- Old Harry Rocks, Dorset
- Penninis, St. Mary's, Isles of Scilly
- Pulpit Rock, Isle of Portland, Dorset
- Tar Rocks, Isle of Portland, Dorset

== Scotland ==
- Ailsa Craig, Firth of Clyde
- Arthur's Seat, Edinburgh
- Bass Rock, Firth of Forth
- Beinn Eighe, Wester Ross
- The Cobbler, Argyll and Bute
- Corrieshalloch Gorge, Ullapool
- Dumbarton Rock
- Duncansby Head, John o' Groats
- Glen Nevis, Fort William
- Gloup Ness, Cullivoe, Shetland Islands
- Liathach, Wester Ross
- Old Man of Hoy, Orkney Islands
- Sgùrr nan Conbhairean, Kyle of Lochalsh
- Stac Biorach, St Kilda archipelago
- Stac Pollaidh, Wester Ross
- Three Sisters, Glen Coe

== Wales ==
- Dinas Rock, Powys
- Mew Slade
- Solva, St. David's Head, Dyfed
- Flat Holm, Glamorgan
- St. Govan's Head, Pembrokeshire
- St. Mary's Well Bay, Cardiff
- Three Cliffs Bay Park, Swansea
- South Stack, Holy Island, Anglesey
- Stackpole Head, Pembrokeshire
- Dylife Gorge, near Machynlleth, Powys
- Worm's Head, Rhossili, Gower

== Northern Ireland ==
- White Rocks Beach, Bushmills, County Antrim
- Giant's Causeway, County Antrim
- Ballintoy, County Antrim
- Waterloo Bay, Larne

== See also ==
- Jurassic Coast
- List of rock formations
