= Walmer Castle (1855 ship) =

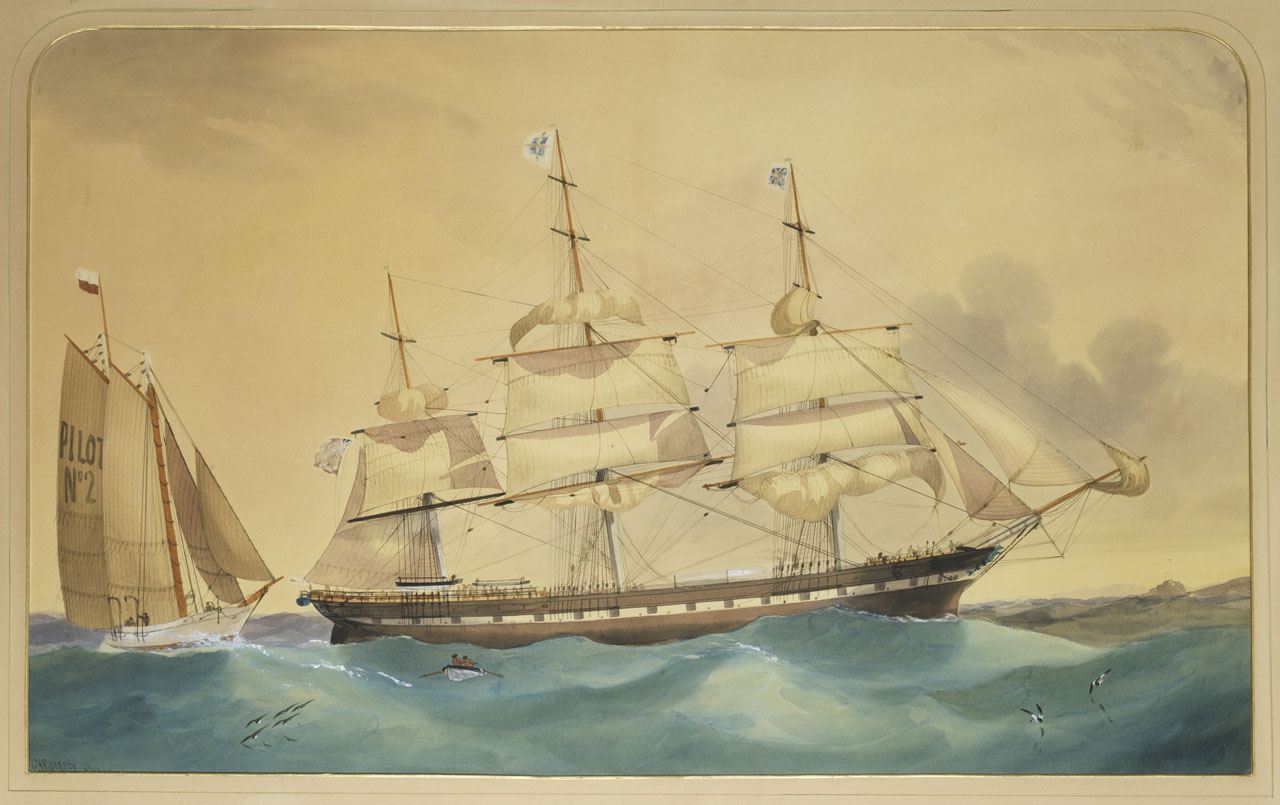
- Walmer Castle in 1862; Thomas Goldsworthy Dutton, National Maritime Museum

History

United Kingdom
- Name: Walmer Castle
- Namesake: Walmer Castle
- Builder: William Pile, Junior, Sunderland
- Launched: 28 August 1855
- Completed: October 1855
- Fate: Burnt 25 December 1877

General characteristics
- Tons burthen: 1064 (bm)
- Length: 192 ft 8 in (58.7 m)
- Beam: 35 ft 0 in (10.7 m)
- Depth: 22 ft 5 in (6.8 m)

Walmar Castle was launched at Sunderland in 1855. She sailed between England and China, India, Australia, and Java. A fire on Christmas Day 1877 destroyed her.

== Career ==
Walmer Castle first appeared in Lloyd's Register (LR) in 1856.

Year	Master	Owner	Trade	Source & notes
1856	Daniels	Green & Co.	London–China	LR
1864	Ormsby; S.Bax	Green & Co.	London–India	LR
1866	S.Bax; W.Styles	Green & Co.	London–India	LR
1867	W.Styles; A.Tucker	Green & Co.	London–India	LR; small repairs 1867
1868	A.Tucker; Burridge	Green & Co.	London–India	LR; small repairs 1867
1869	Burridge	Green & Co.	London–Australia	LR; small repairs 1867
1872	Burriddge; Wildash	Green & Co.	London–India	LR; small repairs 1867
1872	Wildash	Green & Co.	London–India	LR; small repairs 1867
1875	Wildash; S. Boosey	Green & Co. J.K.Welch	London	LR; small repairs 1867
1877	Lanfesty	J.K.Welch	London	LR; small repairs 1867 & 1875

== Fate ==
A telegram from Batavia dated 11:40am 26 December 1876 reported that Walmer Castle, Lanfesty, master, had burnt to the water's edge. She had her outbound cargo on board and the entire cargo had been lost. She had been intending to sail from Java to Holland. The cause of the fire was not known.
