= Grim Ness =

Coordinates: 58°49′08″N 2°52′25″W

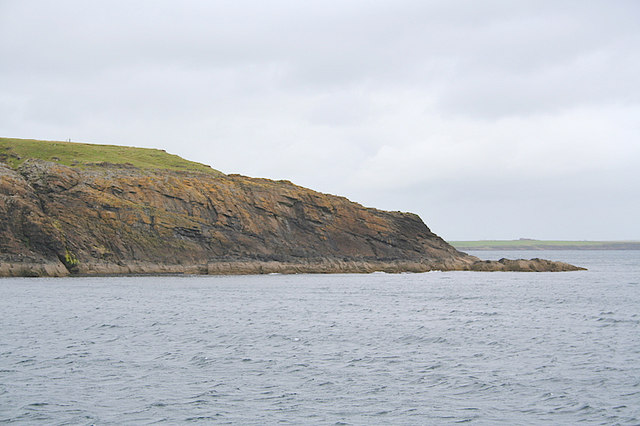
Rounding Grim Ness on the northward journey.

Grimness is a cliff-girt headland on the island of South Ronaldsay, in the Orkney archipelago of Scotland. It is located between Honeysgeo and Skipi Geo and rises to a height of 34 metres above sea level. There is a trig point at the summit. The name is from the Old Norse and means Grim's headland. There are various small skerries offshore including Skerrilee, Scarf Taing, The Keys, Grey Chair, Out Hillock, Broddebb and Stack of Kame. There is a small geo (inlet) in the southern facing cliff known as Sheep Bight. There is a single farm called Head.

The Ordnance Survey grid reference is ND490928.
