= Torllwyn =

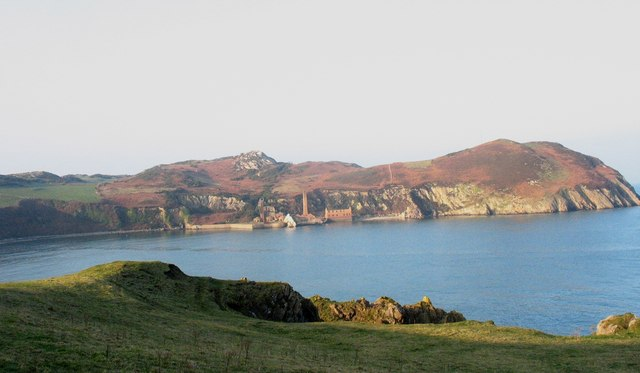
- Torllwyn headland (right)

Highest point
- Coordinates: 53.426262°N 4.406499°W

Geography
- Country: Wales
- OS grid: SH 4020 9486

Torllwyn is a headland in Anglesey, Wales, approximately 2.5 kilometres (1.6 mi) ENE of Porthllechog.

== See also ==
- Media related to Torllwyn at Wikimedia Commons
