= Portrush =

Seaside resort in County Antrim, Northern Ireland

Coordinates: 55.20474°N 6.65222°W

Portrush: Irish: Port Rois; Scots: Tha Port
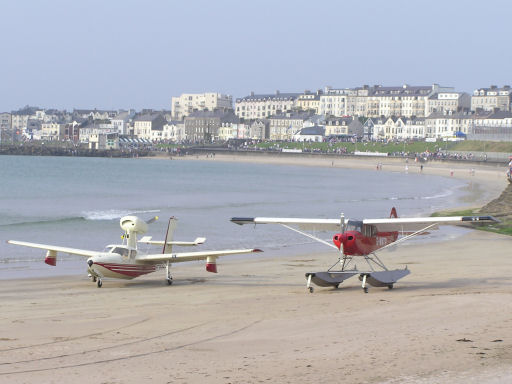
- Planes on the beach during the yearly air show

- Location within Northern Ireland
- Population: 6,150 (Census 2021)
- Irish grid reference: C855409
  - Belfast: 50 miles (80 km)
- District: Causeway Coast and Glens
- County: County Antrim
- Country: Northern Ireland
- Sovereign state: United Kingdom
- Post town: PORTRUSH
- Postcode district: BT56
- Dialling code: 028
- Police: Northern Ireland
- Fire: Northern Ireland
- Ambulance: Northern Ireland
- UK Parliament: East Londonderry
- NI Assembly: East Londonderry

Portrush (from Irish Port Rois, meaning 'port of the promontory') is a small seaside resort town on the north coast of County Antrim, Northern Ireland. It neighbours the resort of Portstewart in County Londonderry. The main part of the old town, including the railway station as well as most hotels, restaurants and bars, is built on a 1 mile (1.6 km)–long peninsula, Ramore Head. It had a population of 6,150 at the 2021 census.

The town is well known for its three sandy beaches, the West Strand, East Strand and White Rocks, as well as the Royal Portrush Golf Club, the only golf club outside Great Britain which has hosted The Open Championship – in 1951, 2019, and 2025.

== History ==
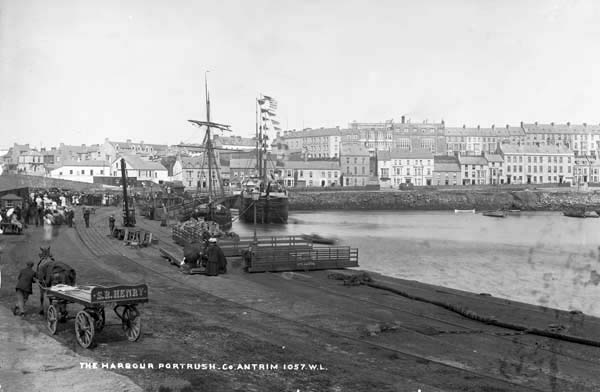
Portrush Harbour c.1900

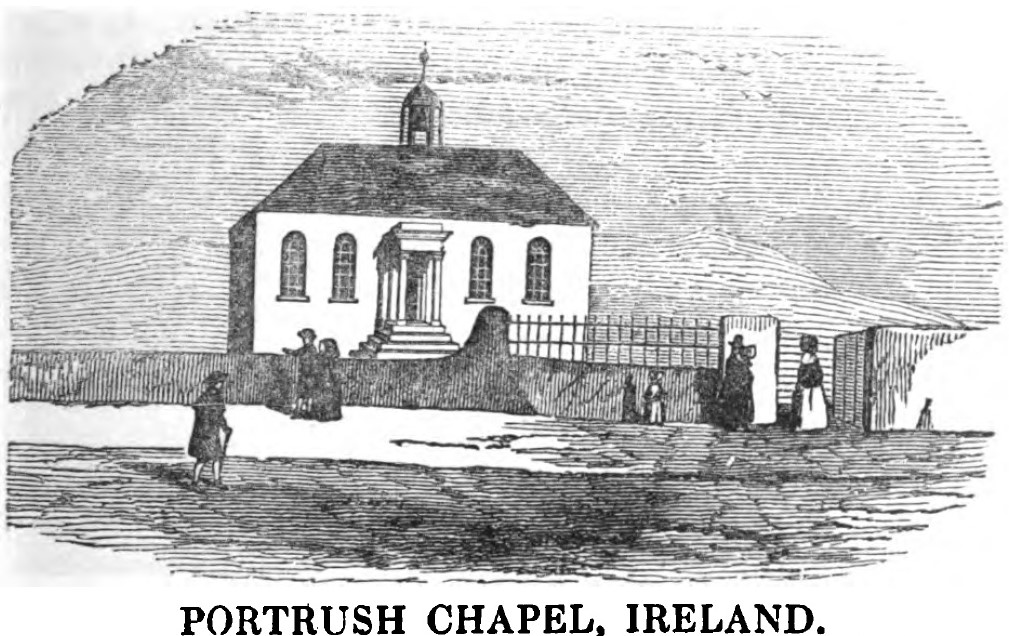
Portrush Chapel, Ireland (1850)

A number of flint tools found during the late 19th century show that the site of Portrush was occupied during the "Larnian" (late Irish Mesolithic) period; recent estimates date this to around 4000 BC.

The site of Portrush, with its excellent natural defences, probably became a permanent settlement around the 12th or 13th century. A church is known to have existed on Ramore Head at this time, but no part of it now survives. From the records of the papal taxation of 1306, the Portrush church – and by extension the village – appears to have been reasonably wealthy. The promontory also held two castles, at varying periods. The first of these, Caisleán an Teenie, is believed to have been at the tip of Ramore Head, and probably destroyed in the late 16th century; the other, Portrush Castle, may have been built around the time of the Plantation of Ulster in the early 17th century. Nothing survives of either castle.

Following the Wars of the Three Kingdoms in the mid-17th century, Portrush became a small fishing town. It grew substantially in the 19th century as a tourist destination, following the opening of the Ballymena, Ballymoney, Coleraine and Portrush Junction Railway in 1855, and by the turn of the 20th century had become one of the major resort towns of Ireland, with a number of large hotels and boarding houses including the prominent Northern Counties Hotel. As well as the town's beaches and the Royal Portrush Golf Club (opened 1888), the nearby Giant's Causeway was a popular tourist destination, with the Giant's Causeway Tramway – at the time, one of the world's longest electrified railways – built in 1893 to cater to travellers coming from Portrush.

The town's fortunes peaked in the late 19th and early 20th century, and declined after the Second World War with the growth of foreign travel. It escaped any involvement in the Troubles until 3 August 1976, when a series of bombings of properties burned out and destroyed several buildings, though with no loss of life. In a second attack in April 1987, two officers of the Royal Ulster Constabulary (RUC) were shot in the back by the Provisional Irish Republican Army while on foot patrol on Main Street.

== Demography ==
=== 2021 Census ===
On Census day (21 March 2021) there were 6,150 people living in Portrush. Of these:

- 59.8% belong to or were brought up in a "Protestant and Other Christian (including Christian related)" faiths and 24.7% belong to or were brought up in the Catholic faith.
- 57.0% indicated that they had a British national identity, 40.7% had a Northern Irish national identity and 15.5% had an Irish national identity (respondents could indicate more than one national identity).

=== 2011 Census ===
On Census day (27 March 2011) there were 6,454 people living in Portrush (2,824 households), accounting for 0.36% of the NI total. Of these:

- 18.89% were aged under 16 years and 19.09% were aged 65 and over.
- 51.78% of the usually resident population were female and 48.22% were male.
- 66.90% belong to or were brought up in a "Protestant and Other Christian (including Christian related)" faiths and 24.84% belong to or were brought up in the Catholic faith.
- 63.43% indicated that they had a British national identity, 32.89% had a Northern Irish national identity and 11.93% had an Irish national identity (respondents could indicate more than one national identity).
- 42 years was the average (median) age of the population.
- 15.75% had some knowledge of Ulster-Scots and 4.83% had some knowledge of Irish (Gaeilge).

== Climate ==
Portrush has an oceanic climate (Köppen: Cfb).

Climate data for Portrush (1991–2020)
Month	Jan	Feb	Mar	Apr	May	Jun	Jul	Aug	Sep	Oct	Nov	Dec	Year
Record high °C (°F)	14.2 (57.6)	14.5 (58.1)	15.9 (60.6)	22.8 (73.0)	24.2 (75.6)	24.2 (75.6)	28.4 (83.1)	28.2 (82.8)	23.8 (74.8)	20.0 (68.0)	15.6 (60.1)	14.6 (58.3)	28.4 (83.1)
Mean daily maximum °C (°F)	8.0 (46.4)	8.5 (47.3)	10.2 (50.4)	12.5 (54.5)	14.9 (58.8)	16.9 (62.4)	18.3 (64.9)	18.3 (64.9)	16.8 (62.2)	13.6 (56.5)	10.6 (51.1)	8.8 (47.8)	13.1 (55.6)
Daily mean °C (°F)	5.7 (42.3)	5.9 (42.6)	7.1 (44.8)	9.3 (48.7)	11.6 (52.9)	13.6 (56.5)	15.4 (59.7)	15.5 (59.9)	13.9 (57.0)	10.8 (51.4)	8.2 (46.8)	6.3 (43.3)	10.3 (50.5)
Mean daily minimum °C (°F)	3.4 (38.1)	3.2 (37.8)	4.0 (39.2)	6.1 (43.0)	8.3 (46.9)	10.4 (50.7)	12.5 (54.5)	12.6 (54.7)	11.1 (52.0)	8.1 (46.6)	5.7 (42.3)	3.8 (38.8)	7.5 (45.5)
Record low °C (°F)	−4.7 (23.5)	−2.0 (28.4)	−4.2 (24.4)	−1.7 (28.9)	2.0 (35.6)	5.4 (41.7)	8.1 (46.6)	7.3 (45.1)	5.0 (41.0)	−2.0 (28.4)	−1.6 (29.1)	−5.5 (22.1)	−5.5 (22.1)
Average precipitation mm (inches)	88.3 (3.48)	78.0 (3.07)	65.0 (2.56)	55.3 (2.18)	57.5 (2.26)	72.1 (2.84)	85.4 (3.36)	86.8 (3.42)	75.1 (2.96)	98.2 (3.87)	110.6 (4.35)	104.0 (4.09)	976.4 (38.44)
Average precipitation days (≥ 1.0 mm)	17.6	14.5	14.4	12.1	12.6	12.8	14.6	15.2	14.3	16.2	18.4	18.5	181.3
Mean monthly sunshine hours	52.8	72.7	115.0	189.6	224.6	164.4	159.1	146.8	127.0	98.2	53.4	37.8	1,441.3
Source 1: Met Office
Source 2: Starlings Roost Weather

== Places of interest ==
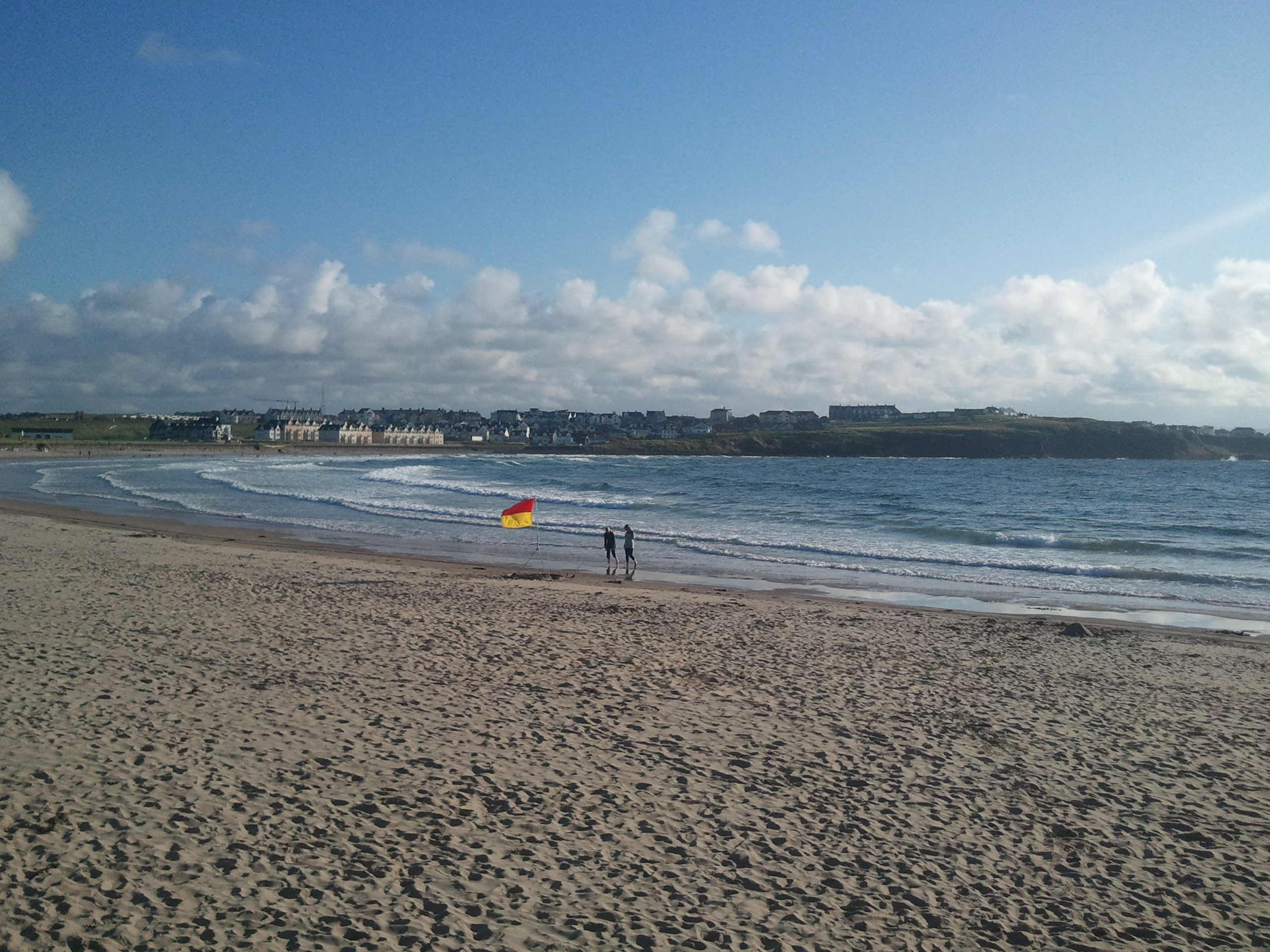
Portrush's West Strand Beach.

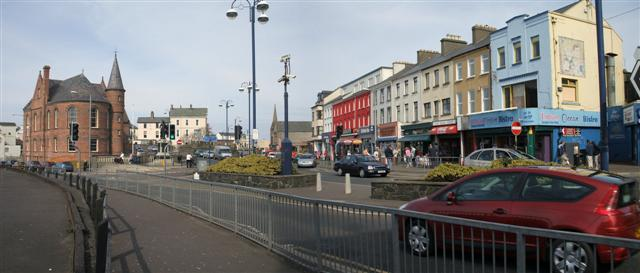
Portrush shops

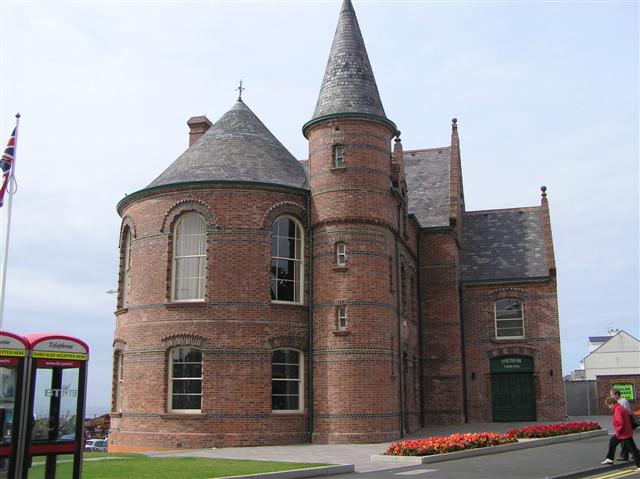
Portrush Town Hall

- Attractions in the town include the "Coastal Zone" (formerly the Portrush Countryside Centre). The town also formerly housed Dunluce Entertainment Centre and Waterworld swimming complex, which both permanently closed in 2013 and 2018 respectively. On the edge of town, the links of the Royal Portrush Golf Club, which hosted the 1951 British Open golf championship, and Ballyreagh Golf Course. The Open returned to Portrush in July 2019 and July 2025.
- For the 2019 Open, The Royal and Ancient Golf Club of St Andrews invested significant funds in the region to improve the rail service and worked with the club to modify the course so it could better host a modern major championship. The 2019 championship had the largest advance ticket sales of any Open ever held.
- There are two long sandy beaches in the resort: West and East Strand. White Rocks and Curran Strand stretch on from the East Strand and are backed by dunes. The coast continues past Dunluce Castle to the Giant's Causeway. It was once possible to travel to these attractions from Portrush on the Giant's Causeway Tramway. To the People of the Sea, a 13 ft (4 m) high bronze sculpture on the East Strand, inspired by the sails of local traditional boats, is by Cork-based sculptor Holger Lönze.
- Portrush is home to one of Northern Ireland's best-known nightclubs. The nightclub Lush! was immortalised by musicians CJ Agnelli of Agnelli & Nelson and Col Hamilton with one of their first releases, titled "Lush", and the later remixes, "Lush Gold".
- Portrush is also home to Barry's Amusements (now Curry's Fun Park Portrush), the largest amusement park in Northern Ireland. Actor James Nesbitt once worked there. The park was put up for sale as a potential development site in May 2021, and reopened as Curry's in May 2022.
- The Skerries, a series of small rocky islets just off the coast, are an important habitat for several species, some unique to Northern Ireland.
- Portrush Town Hall which was completed in 1872.

== Events ==
Portrush hosts an annual air show at the beginning of September.

The Royal National Lifeboat Institution raft race is an annual event in which contestants must build a raft that can take them from the West Strand beach into Portrush Harbour. The event has been featured on Northern Ireland news broadcasts in several years.

The North West 200 is a motorcycle road race following the triangular route around Portstewart, Coleraine and Portrush. Held every May, with events in various engine categories, it attracts crowds in excess of 150,000.

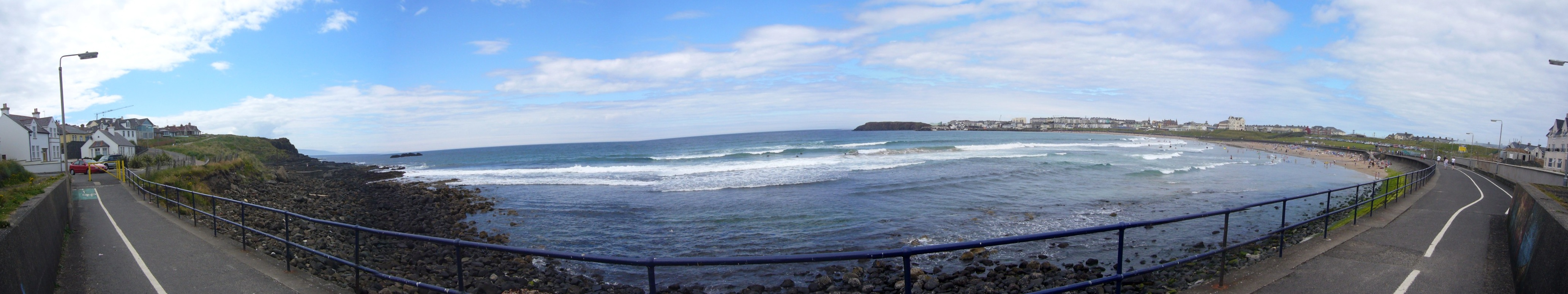
A panorama of Portrush

== Education ==
The following schools are in Portrush:

- Portrush Primary School: a primary school with a nursery unit on Crocnamac Road. The school educates around 250 pupils aged 4–11. Portrush Primary was established in 1959.
- Carnalridge Primary School.
- Mill Strand Integrated Primary School.
- St. Patricks Primary School.

== Sport ==
The local golf club is the Royal Portrush Golf Club, a 36-hole club.

The Northern Ireland Milk Cup uses Parker Avenue in Portrush as one of the pitches for the association football tournament, and many teams stay within the town itself.

The town is also home to the Portrush Yacht Club, a popular stop for yachts travelling in from the Atlantic Ocean or to the western coast of Scotland. The yacht club runs an annual raft race to raise funds for the Royal National Lifeboat Institution in Portrush harbour.

== Transport ==
Portrush railway station was opened on 4 December 1855 and closed for goods traffic on 20 September 1954. The station is the last stop on the Coleraine-Portrush railway line, where travellers can connect with trains to Derry, Belfast and beyond.

Portrush is a busy seaside resort, with a frequent train service run by Northern Ireland Railways connecting with Ulsterbus services linking to Bushmills and the Giant's Causeway.

== Lifeboats ==
Lifeboats of the Royal National Lifeboat Institution (RNLI) have operated out of Portrush Harbour since 1860, and currently stationed there are the Severn class William Gordon Burr and the D-class inshore vessel David Roulston.

== Notable people ==
- Fred Daly (1911–1990) – golfer, winner of the 1947 Open Championship
- Gregory Gray (1959–2019) – musician, also known as Paul Lerwill and Mary Cigarettes.
- Mark Ashton (1960–1987) – LGBT activist, lived in Portrush
- Darren Clarke (born 1968) – professional golfer, winner of the 2011 The Open Championship, lives in Portrush.
- Graeme McDowell (born 1979) – professional golfer who was the first Irishman to win the U.S. Open, grew up in Portrush.

== See also ==
- List of RNLI stations
- List of localities in Northern Ireland by population
