= The Skerries, Northern Ireland =

Coordinates: 55.2245°N 6.6221°W

The Skerries: Irish: Na Sceirí; Scots: Tha Skerries
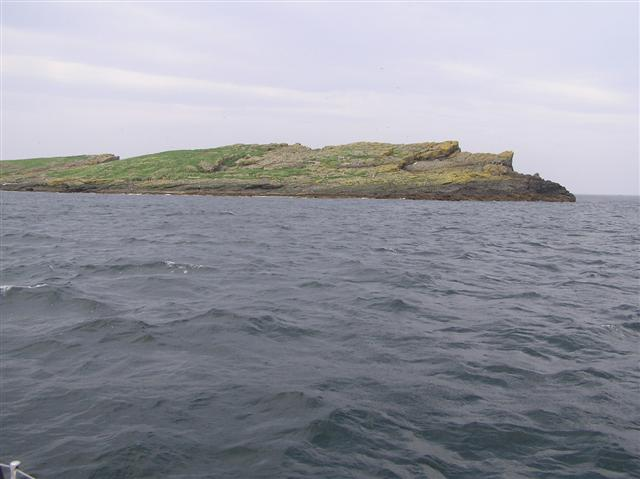
- A large skerrie near Portrush

- Location within Northern Ireland
- Population: (2001)
- Irish grid reference: C855409
  - Belfast: 50 miles (80 km)
- District: Coleraine
- County: County Antrim
- Country: Northern Ireland
- Sovereign state: United Kingdom
- Post town: PORTRUSH
- Postcode district: BT56
- Dialling code: 028, +44 28
- Police: Northern Ireland
- Fire: Northern Ireland
- Ambulance: Northern Ireland
- UK Parliament: East Londonderry

The Skerries are a small group of rocky islands (skerries) just off Portrush, County Antrim, on the north coast of Northern Ireland. Winkle Isle is the local name for the large Skerry island, the small Skerry being known as Castle Isle. The islands are part of an Area of Special Scientific Interest.

Local boat trips from Portrush pass the Skerries en route to the Giant's Causeway.

== Area of Special Scientific Interest ==
In 1996 the islands were designated as part of the Ramore Head and The Skerries Area of Special Scientific Interest. The islands are a habitat for breeding by a range of seabirds including kittiwake, black guillemot and eider duck. The temperature of the Skerries during the summer months is warmer than other parts of Northern Ireland, and so the rocks are home to particularly interesting fauna; it is the only place many southern species such as the cotton spinner sea cucumber Holothuria forskali are found in Northern Ireland. There are several protected habitats located around the Skerries, notably for seagrass (Zostera marina) and horse mussel (Modiolus modiolus). In addition, recent surveys have found numbers of the spiny spider crab (Maja brachydactyla), which is new to Northern Ireland.

== Shipwrecks ==
On 28 December 1879 the sailing vessel, Thomas Graham, owned by John and Thomas Candlish of Palnackie in Scotland, and captained by John Candlish, was stranded at the Skerries and lost.
