= Antrim Road =

Road in Northern Ireland

The Antrim Road is a major arterial route and area of housing and commerce that runs from inner city north Belfast to Dunadry, passing through Newtownabbey and Templepatrick. It forms part of the A6 road, a traffic route which links Belfast to Londonderry. It passes through the New Lodge, Newington and Glengormley areas of Northern Ireland amongst others.

== History ==
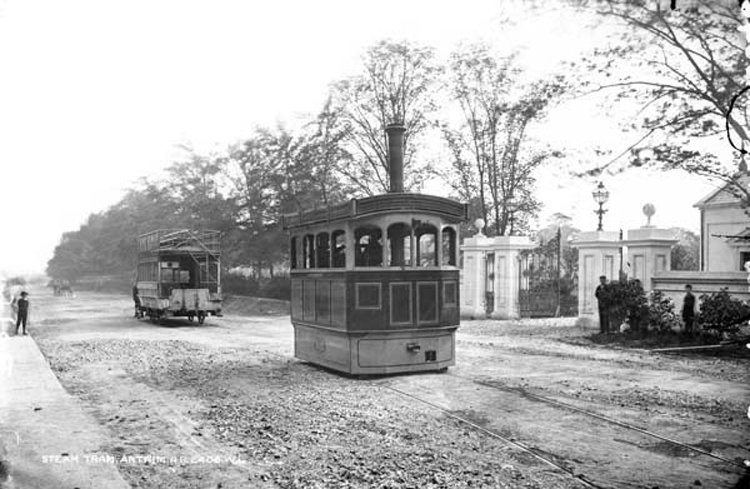
Steam tram at the gates of Chichester Park, 1897

The Antrim Road was initially a much shorter road than it is now and this smaller exit from the city centre was originally known as Duncairn Street. It took its present name from the fact that it links to Antrim town, a role that was previously filled by what is now the Shankill Road, which lies west of the Antrim Road.

The road was one of the areas of the city to suffer sustained bombardment by the Luftwaffe as part of the Belfast Blitz of April and May 1941 and was amongst those hit the hardest resulting in a high number of casualties. The Waterworks on Antrim Road, Belfast's principal source of water, was one of the Luftwaffe's targets. On the night of 15/16 April 1941 German bombers launched their deadliest attack on Belfast. Shortly after the air raid sirens sounded at 10.40 pm, the Luftwaffe bombers began dropping incendiaries, powerful explosive bombs and parachute mines. North Belfast was first to be attacked and bore the brunt of the bombardment with entire swaths of terraced houses levelled. The Antrim Road in particular took the full force of the air raid which resulted in an inferno that engulfed the street. The Auxiliary Fire Brigade was unable to put out the conflagration as the water mains had been broken in 20 places. Victoria Barracks, in the New Lodge area, had been destroyed by a number of direct hits. Burke Street, which ran between Annadale and Dawson streets, was obliterated by bombs, its 20 dwellings flattened and all of the occupants killed. The Ministry of Public Security ordered the killing of 23 animals from the nearby Belfast Zoo as it was feared the air raids would lead to the animals escaping thus posing a risk to the populace. The animals which were shot included a tiger, a lynx, a hyena, a black bear, two polar bears, and six wolves.

== Lower Antrim Road ==
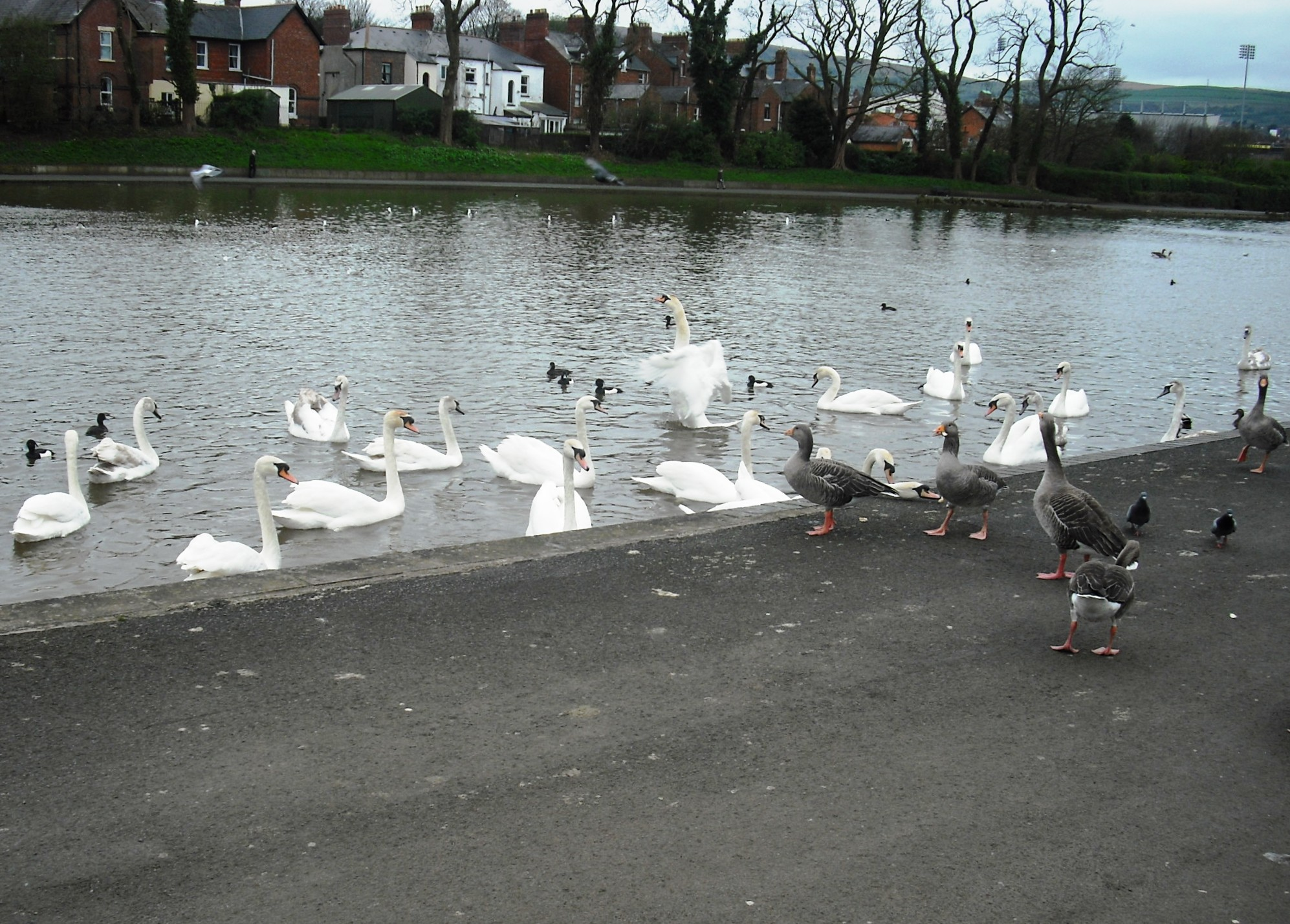
Several waterfowl make their homes at the man-made lakes of the Waterworks

The Antrim Road begins at Carlisle Circus, a roundabout north of the city centre just past the Westlink motorway. It is one of four exits from Carlisle Circus, the others being the Crumlin Road, a major arterial and residential route that forms part of the A2, Clifton Street which leads back to Belfast city centre, and Denmark Street which leads to the area of the Lower Shankill Road.

Annesley Street is located near the beginning of the road and it featured the synagogue, the former centre of the Jewish community in Belfast. Opened in 1904 after a sizeable donation from Otto Jaffe it served as the city's synagogue for a number of years before more modern premises were secured on Somerton Road. The area was noted for its Jewish population, with many Russian Jews fleeing persecution settling there in the later nineteenth and early twentieth centuries. The synagogue is close to St Malachy's College, a historic Catholic grammar school for boys which has produced several notable alumni.

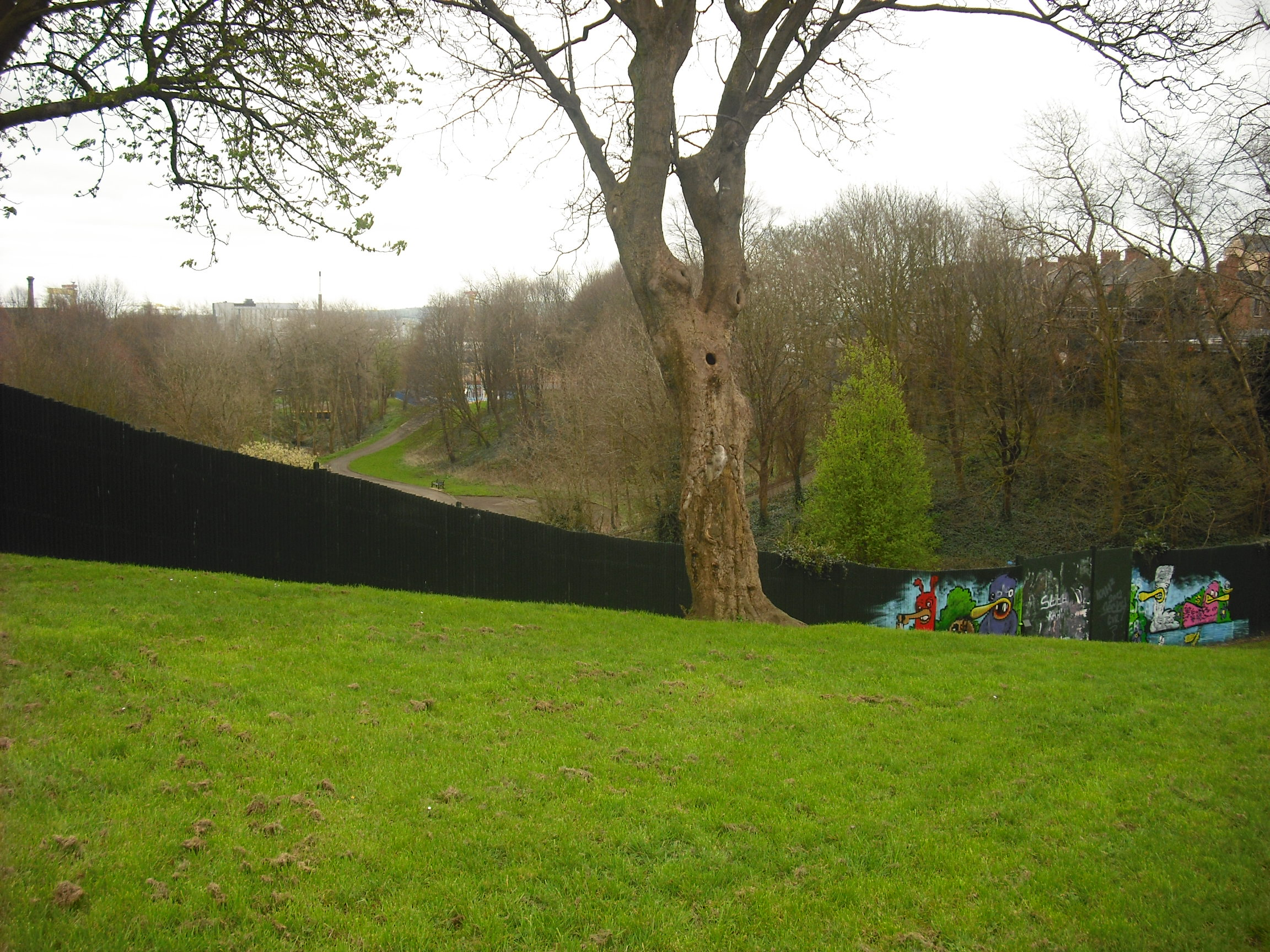
The fence in Alexandra Park, viewed from the Catholic Newington side looking towards the Protestant Shore Road side

The New Lodge district of Belfast is located to the south of St Malachy's College and centred on the New Lodge Road, which links the Antrim Road to North Queen Street. New Lodge is bordered on the north by Duncairn Gardens with the loyalist Tiger's Bay forming an interface area. It is one of the older areas of the Antrim Road, although it was previously known as the Pinkerton Row area.

The Newington area borders two public parks on this part of the Antrim Road, the Waterworks on the corner of the Cavehill Road and Alexandra Park, which in 1994 was divided in two by a fence after clashes between Newington republicans and Shore Road loyalists. The fence remains in place although a gate was added in 2011 permitting limited access from one side to the other. This area of the Antrim Road also hosts Saint Ignatius', a building used by the Russian Orthodox Church Outside Russia, having previously been occupied by the Antiochian Orthodox Church.

The Cliftonville Road faces the New Lodge area and it runs Northwest, linking up with the Oldpark Road as it heads towards the Ardoyne area. It was built in the 1890s to link the Antrim Road with the Old Park Road (as it was known at the time). Belfast Royal Academy, a voluntary grammar school founded in 1785, is located on the Cliftonville Road. Solitude, the home of Cliftonville F.C., is also located on a street just behind the Cliftonville Road. Both Cliftonville Cricket Club and Cliftonville Hockey Club originated in the area. All three clubs came under threat during the early days of the troubles for being perceived as Unionist clubs. The Cricket and Hockey clubs vacated after their grounds were looted and firebombed in 1972 while the Football club was adopted by the local Nationalist community in the aftermath of the nearby Distillery club also losing their grounds in the violence.

== Cavehill to Bellevue ==
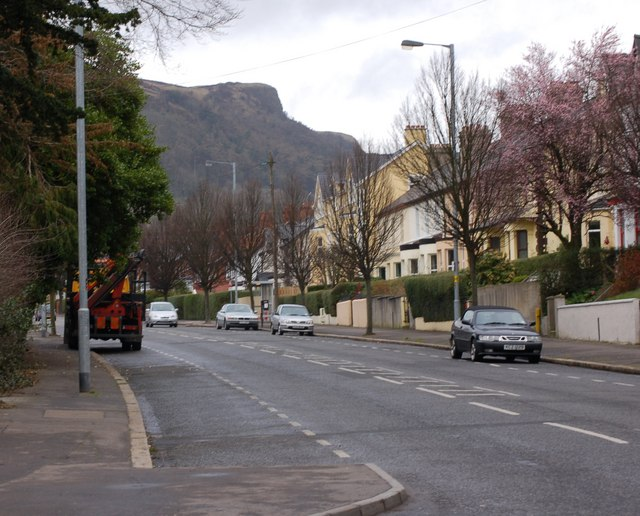
Cavehill Road

The Cavehill Road, which runs Northwest off the Antrim Road, takes its name from Cavehill, a large basaltic hill that dominates the skyline over much of the Antrim Road. The Cavehill Road is itself an interface, separating the traditionally Protestant Westland Road and the Catholic areas known as "Little America" although co-operation between community groups aimed at decreasing tensions has increased. The Westland estate was previously home to the Shoukri brothers, two dominant figures in the North Belfast Brigade of the UDA who subsequently fell out of favour. Cliftonville Golf Club is also located on Westland Road.

The Antrim Road Police Service of Northern Ireland station is located close to the Cavehill Road junction. Nearby is Skegoneill Avenue, the entry to which is marked by the imposing Fortwilliam and Macrory Presbyterian Church, which was opened in 1885 and has become a Roman Catholic church in 2019, under the name of Church of the Immaculate Heart of Mary. A football stadium also called Skegoneill is also located on the Avenue and is the home of the minor league side Brantwood F.C. The ground has also been used by Newington F.C., an NIFL Championship club that originated in the Newington district but which has led a peripatetic existence due to a lack of a home ground. The area is also the location for Dunmore Park Camp, a facility used by the Territorial Army to house the North Irish Horse.

Beyond this section of the road there are the Salisbury and Chichester Park areas, which are largely made up of middle class private housing. St Peter's Church, Belfast, a historic Church of Ireland church built in 1900, is found in this section of the Antrim Road, facing the North Circular Road. This road leads back to the Crumlin Road, passing through the loyalist Ballysillan area.

The upper section of the Antrim Road in Belfast is variously known as Downview and Bellevue, with both areas mostly made up of large detached and semi-detached private houses. The Somerton Road, which runs alongside the Antrim Road at this part, is the current location of the main synagogue for the Belfast Hebrew Congregation. "Lisbreen", the official residence of the Bishop of Down and Connor, is also located on the Somerton Road. Belfast Castle is located in Cavehill Country Park overlooking the Antrim Road in the Downview area. The Bellevue area is also the location of Belfast Zoo. Overlooking the north shore of Belfast Lough, this elevated coastal area enjoys the mildest climate in Belfast and is one of the few areas of the city where palm trees and other semi-tropical plants have been successfully grown.

== Outside Belfast ==
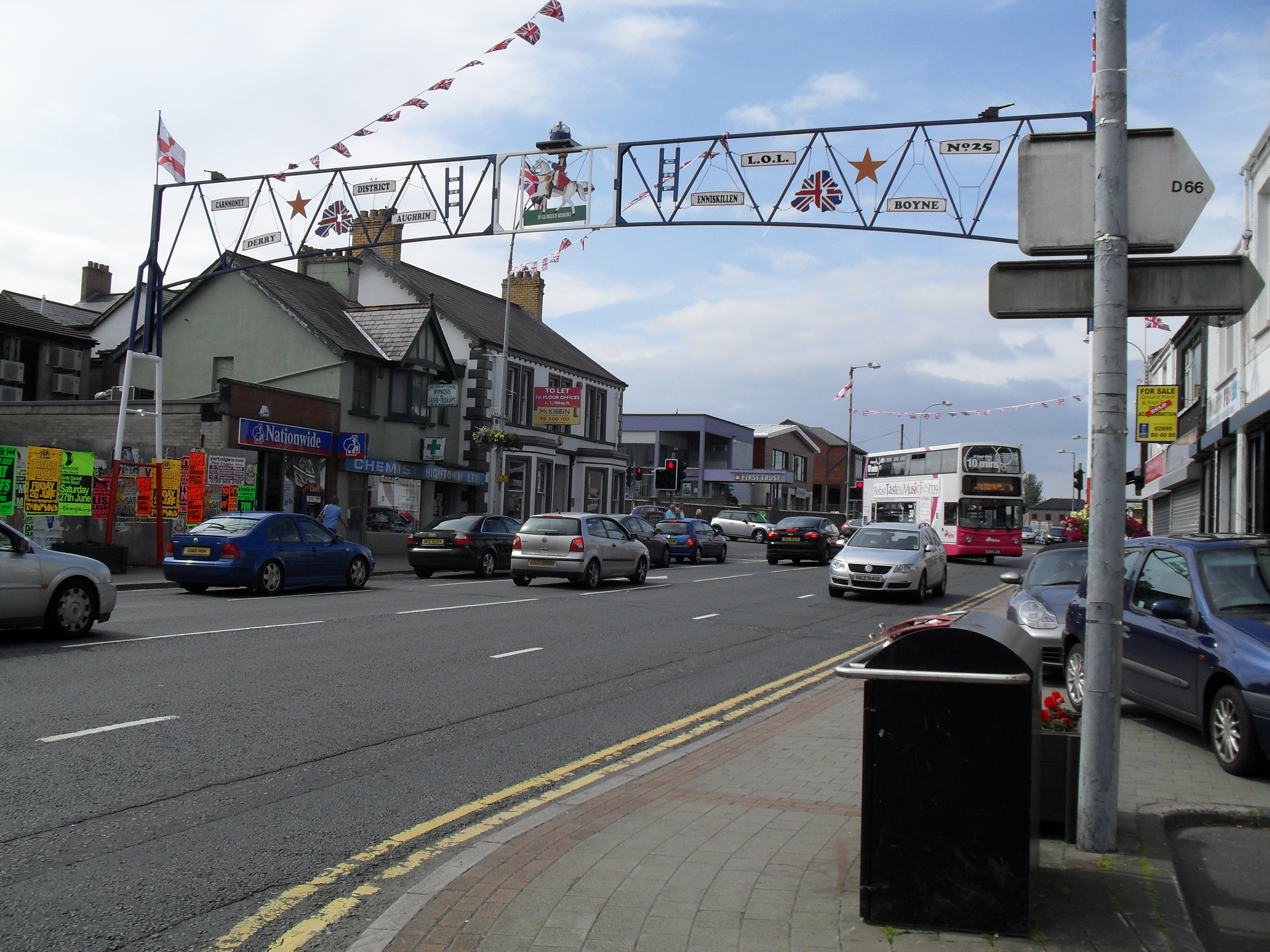
Antrim Road in Glengormley, around "The Twelfth"

The border between Belfast and Newtownabbey forms soon after the Antrim Road passes over the M2 motorway. The road then passes through the Glengormley suburb of Newtownabbey and forms its main shopping district. Barron Hall, a venue used by the Newtownabbey Community Forum which involves both communities, was targeted in a sectarian arson attack in July 2010 having been mistaken for an Orange hall. Glengormley police station was also located close to Barron Hall. The road continues through the residential areas of Glengormley until it reaches Sandyknowes roundabout at which point it diverts into the industrial areas of Mallusk, also passing through the City of Belfast Golf Course.

Following Mallusk the Antrim Road enters a mainly rural area in which it is largely parallel to the M2. This continues until the roundabout junction with the Ballyclare Road, when the Antrim Road forms the main thoroughfare through the village of Templepatrick. After more countryside the road ends at Dunadry, where it changes its name to the Belfast Road. Under various names, this road continues as the A6 to Derry.

== Politics ==
The Antrim Road passes through three separate constituencies for UK House of Commons and Northern Ireland Assembly elections i.e. North Belfast, East Antrim and South Antrim. The North Belfast parliament seat is held by John Finucane of Sinn Féin whilst the corresponding Assembly seats are held by Paula Bradley and William Humphrey and of the DUP, Carál Ní Chuilín and Gerry Kelly of Sinn Féin and Nichola Mallon of the Social Democratic and Labour Party (SDLP). The East Antrim parliamentary seat is held by Sammy Wilson (DUP) with the Assembly seats held by David Hilditch and Gordon Lyonsof the DUP, Roy Beggs Jr and John Stewart of the Ulster Unionist Party (UUP), and Stewart Dickson of the Alliance Party of Northern Ireland (APNI). The MP for South Antrim is Paul Girvan (DUP) whilst the MLAS for the seat are Trevor Clarke and Pam Cameron of the DUP, John Blair of the APNI, Steve Aiken of the UUP and Declan Kearney of Sinn Féin.

Much of the Antrim Road is within Belfast City Council, specifically the Castle and Oldpark district electoral areas. Castle is represented by Lydia Patterson and Gut Spence of the DUP, Mary Campbell and Tierna Cunningham of Sinn Féin, David Browne of the UUP and Pat Convery of the SDLP. The seats in Oldpark are held by Daniel Lavery, Conor Maskey and Gerard McCabe of Sinn Féin, Ian Crozier and Gareth McKee of the DUP and Nichola Mallon of the SDLP.

After Belfast the road enters the territory of Newtownabbey Borough Council where it is contained within the Antrim Line area. The seven councillors for this area are Audrey Ball and Paula Bradley of the DUP, Marie Mackessy and Gerard O'Reilly of Sinn Féin, as well as John Blair (APNI), Mark Cosgrove (UUP) and Noreen McClelland (SDLP).

Following this the remainder of the road is contained within the Antrim South East area of Antrim Borough Council. The councillors are Sam Dunlop and Roy Thompson of the DUP, Paul Michael and Mervyn Rea of the UUP as well as Thomas Burns (SDLP), Alan Lawther (APNI) and Annemarie Logue (Sinn Féin).

== Education ==
As well as St Malachy's College and Belfast Royal Academy other secondary schools on or close to the Antrim Road include Dominican College, Fortwilliam, Blessed Trinity College (amalgamation of St Patrick's College, Belfast, and Little Flower Girls School), and Hazelwood Integrated College on the neighbouring Whitewell Road. Castle High School which was established on the site of Dunlambert Boys Secondary School in 1985 closed in 2009. Several primary schools are found in and around the Antrim Road including Edmund Rice, Holy Family, Currie Primary School, St Therese of Liseux Primary School and Our Lady of Lourdes Primary School.

== The Troubles ==
The Antrim Road was the scene of several high-profile attacks and killings during the conflict known as the Troubles. The area was said to be notorious for the high level of paramilitary activity, especially Republican terrorists. It had previously had a fairly mixed population although the outbreak of the violence saw a significant demographic shift as Protestants moved out, leaving behind a mainly Catholic population in the lower areas of the road. The Provisional Irish Republican Army (PIRA), Ulster Volunteer Force (UVF) and Ulster Defence Association (UDA) were all active in the area. Indeed, as late as 2011 the Antrim Road was still being affected by the hangover of the Troubles when in January of that year the Glandore area around Skegoneill Avenue was closed due to a car bomb left by dissident republicans.

=== PIRA ===
The PIRA, specifically the Third Battalion of the Provisional IRA Belfast Brigade, was for a long time active in the republican districts on the lower Antrim Road. One of the group's earliest attacks in the local area occurred on 29 October 1971 when a Royal Ulster Constabulary (RUC) officer was killed by a bomb at the police base on the Antrim Road. On 21 July 1972, two Catholic women (Brigid Murray and Margaret O'Hare) and a Protestant teenager (Stephen Parker) were killed when a bomb detonated on Cavehill Road as part of the Bloody Friday bombings when the Provisional IRA exploded 22 bombs across Belfast in the space of eighty minutes. Shootings between the PIRA and the security forces were regular events in the New Lodge area during the early 1970s and on 4 February 1973 one of these resulted in the deaths of an IRA volunteer and three civilians, were shot dead by British Army snipers. PIRA sniper attacks resulted in the deaths of an RUC officer on 16 October 1973 and a British soldier on 21 March 1974. Both had been on patrol on the Antrim Road when they were hit. The Provisionals also shot and killed a man in September 1974 on Newington Street. A piece of cardboard was found nearby that had written on it: "this is the penalty for a sexual assault on a child of seven years old at the Waterworks". After the shooting a caller rang the Irish News and said it had been a "punishment shooting" carried out by the IRA. On 24 September 1976 they killed two more men, a UDA member and a Protestant civilian, at Cavehill Inn on Cavehill Road, Belfast.

The PIRA returned to its sniper activity on the Antrim Road during the 1980s, killing a soldier on 2 May 1980 and an RUC officer in Duncairn Gardens on 6 May 1981. 21 October 1981: A UDR soldier was shot dead outside Belfast Zoo. This was followed on 8 January 1982 by the killing of an Ulster Defence Regiment soldier who was working at an Antrim Road petrol station. A further RUC officer was killed on 23 June 1987 during another gun attack on the road's police station.

On 16 March 1989 the PIRA killed John Irvine, a senior member of the UVF at his home in the Skegoneill area after a unit entered his home and shot him 15 times at close range. Later that same year a civilian was killed on the Cavehill Road in what The Sunday Tribune reported had been an error, with a loyalist paramilitary again the intended target. The Belfast Brigade issued an apology and confirmed it had been a case of mistaken identity. Their last major attack in the area also occurred on the Cavehill Road on 30 December 1992 when a British soldier who lived there was killed at his home. Two IRA volunteers burst into the house armed with AK-47 assault rifles and shot the soldier at least 13 times at close range. The soldier's wife claimed that IRA volunteer Thomas Begley was one of the gunmen.

=== UVF ===
UVF activity during the early 1970s helped to earn the road its "murder mile" nickname with a number of killings and attacks carried out by the paramilitary organisation. On 4 June 1972 they shot dead a Catholic civilian at his shop on Annesley Street and nineteen days later they carried out a drive-by shooting on a group of Catholics standing outside a bank at the corner of Antrim Road and Atlantic Avenue. One Catholic civilian was killed and another wounded. On 25 September 1974 a further Catholic civilian was killed by the UVF on the Limestone Road.

Using the cover name of Protestant Action Force (PAF), the UVF claimed responsibility for blowing up the Christian Brothers Past Pupils Union building on 21 May 1975. This was followed on 17 October the same year by the murder of a Protestant taxi driver on the Cavehill Road, with the group wrongly assuming that he was Catholic. On 17 January 1976 they launched a no-warning bomb attack on Sheridan's Bar at New Lodge Road, Belfast. Two Catholic civilians were killed and 26 wounded. This was followed on 5 November 1976 by the shooting of a 15-year-old Catholic civilian as she stood outside a friend's home on Newington Street. She died the following day. It is believed the UVF was responsible.

UVF activity in the area tailed off thereafter, apart from the killing of a Catholic civilian in a shop on 1 September 1979 and a further killing by the "Protestant Action Force" on 19 July 1986. However the UVF killed two Catholic civilians on the Antrim Road within the space of three weeks in November 1990, one at his home in Spamount Street in the New Lodge and the other at his Duncairn Gardens workplace. The group's last killing occurred on 17 February 1994 when a Catholic civilian living on Skegoneill Avenue was killed at his home by the Red Hand Commando.

=== UDA ===
Although the North Belfast Brigade was not often the most active of the UDA's six area, the Antrim Road's proximity to the Lower Shankill Road, the stronghold of the UDA West Belfast Brigade, ensured that the UDA was also active locally. The first killing to be identified in the area as the work of the UDA occurred on 4 May 1972 when a Catholic civilian was found stabbed-to-death in an entry between Baltic Avenue and Atlantic Avenue in the Newington area. Later, on 16 May 1974, a UDA member shot dead a Catholic civilian at the Edlingham Street/Stratheden Street junction. She had stopped to talk to a friend. A witness said the gunman emerged from the loyalist Tiger Bay area. There had been sporadic trouble in the area that day and locals complained that the British Army had done little to stop UDA activity nearby. This was followed on 14 June 1975 by the killing of a Catholic civilian in a drive-by shooting on New Lodge Road, Belfast. On 27 August 1976 UDA members petrol-bombed the home of a young Catholic family on Hillman Street, just off the Duncairn Gardens interface. Two Catholic civilians and their ten-month-old baby were killed. The killing of another Catholic civilian on the Cavehill Road on 27 May 1978 brought an end to UDA shootings in the area for some ten years however.

The UDA returned to action on the Antrim Road on 10 May 1988 when, using the Ulster Freedom Fighters code name, the UDA claimed responsibility for shooting dead a Catholic civilian at his home on Newington Street. This was followed on 12 February 1989 by what would later become one of their most notorious actions when UDA members entered the home of Pat Finucane on Fortwilliam Drive, off the Antrim Road and shot him dead. The killing has since been at the centre of allegations regarding collusion between loyalist paramilitaries and the British security forces.

The UDA committed two further killings in the area during 1993, killing a Catholic woman at her Fortwilliam Park home on 30 August 1993 and a Catholic man at his home on Newington Avenue on 15 October 1993, with both victims civilians. Their last killing on the road came after the collapse of the 1994 Combined Loyalist Military Command ceasefire when, on 1 September 1996 they shot dead a Catholic civilian outside his friend's house on Skegoneill Avenue.
