= St Peter's Church, Belfast =

Coordinates: 54°38′2.83″N 5°56′11.58″W

St Peter's Church
- St Peter's Church
- Location: Antrim Road, Belfast BT15 4EF
- Country: Northern Ireland
- Denomination: Church of Ireland
- Website: stpeters.connor.anglican.org

History
- Status: Parish Church
- Founded: 1900
- Dedicated: June 1900
- Consecrated: June 1900

Architecture
- Functional status: Active
- Heritage designation: Grade B1
- Architect: Samuel P Close
- Style: Gothic Revival
- Completed: 1900

Specifications
- Materials: Scrabo Sandstone

Administration
- Archdiocese: Diocese of Armagh
- Diocese: Diocese of Connor
- Archdeaconry: Belfast
- Deanery: North Belfast
- Parish: St Peter & St James

Clergy
- Rector: Rev. Brian Lacey

St Peter's Church is a Church of Ireland parish church in Belfast, Northern Ireland. The building is the centre of worship for the Anglican community based on or around the Antrim Road within the city limits.

== History ==
The chancel and eastern part of the nave were beautifully constructed using Scrabo sandstone at the very end of the 19th century and furnished to a high standard. In the following decades, the church was described as “a slice of a cathedral”, and as having “an appearance and dignity such as is rarely met with in our local ecclesiastical structures.”

The west end of the building was added in the early 1930s. Although it was completed in the same style as the original building, there is a noticeable colour difference between the original stonework and the later extension, as viewed from within the building. In addition, in the very middle of the nave there is a small hole in the floor, where the lock on the original door bolted into the ground.

The church now contains several items from the Chapel of the Resurrection, which was a very small chapel-of-ease built for the Earl of Shaftesbury, a short distance away, halfway between St Peter's and Belfast Castle. For a long time there was a service on Choral Evensong in the chapel, and many choirs from all over Belfast were regularly invited to take part. Unfortunately it was closed due to vandalism in the 1970s. Following its closure, many of its furnishings were placed in the side-chapel of St Peter's. This area of the church was renamed the Chapel of the Resurrection in tribute to the former place of worship. It is used for small congregations for Holy Communion.

The church also houses some items that were once used in St James’ church, which is located further down the Antrim Road towards Belfast city centre. About 30 years older than St Peter's, St James’ is a very imposing building in the midst of the commercial heart of the Antrim Road, right beside Belfast Royal Academy. Unfortunately, the congregation dwindled rapidly from the onset of the Troubles in the 1970s as many Protestants moved out of this part of north Belfast in response to sectarian tensions in the area. Consequently, it was determined that St Peter's and St James should join together and share a rector. Finally in 2007 the difficult decision was taken to close the church and deconsecrate the building as a place of Anglican worship. The Holy Table and Reredos, the Eagle Lectern, a hymn book stand, a linen cupboard, several flower stands, hymn boards, diocesan Sunday School banner, Mothers' Union banner, side-chapel Holy Table, and several other items of interest, were removed from St James and now furnish St Peter's. The north aisle in which the furnishings from St James' have been relocates, has been renamed the St James' Chapel in tribute to the former church. It is normally used for non-choral evening services.

A new suite of halls were built at St Peter's in 2007, including a Main Hall, a Minor Hall, a kitchen, toilets, and a purpose-built Parish Office. The halls can be accessed internally from the church, via the north transept.

== Rectors ==
St Peter's has had seven rectors since its consecration in 1900:

The Very Rev'd Henry Brett (incumbent 1900 - 1926) who subsequently became Archdeacon of Connor and thereafter Dean of St Anne's Cathedral, Belfast.

The Very Rev'd Dr Richard Breen (incumbent 1926 - 1963) who became concurrently Dean of Connor.

The Rev'd Canon Will Harris (incumbent 1963 - 1990) who became concurrently a Canon of St Patrick's Cathedral, Dublin.

The Venerable Dr Stephen McBride (incumbent 1990 - 1995) who subsequently became Archdeacon of Connor.

The Rev'd Canon Charles McCollum (incumbent 1995 - 2008) the first rector of the united parish of St Peter & St James, who subsequently became a Canon of Ossary Cathedral, Kilkenny.

The Rev'd Adrian Dorrian (incumbent 2009 - 2012).

The Rev'd Brian Lacey (incumbent 2013–present) who is concurrently Rural Dean of North Belfast.

== See also ==
- List of places of worship in Belfast
