= St Thomas' Church, Belfast =

Coordinates: 54.582°N 5.946°W

St Thomas' Church
- St Thomas' Church
- Location: Eglantine Avenue, Belfast
- Country: Northern Ireland
- Denomination: Anglican
- Website: http://stthomas.connor.anglican.org/

History
- Status: Parish church
- Consecrated: 1870

Architecture
- Functional status: Active
- Completed: 1869

Administration
- Archdiocese: Diocese of Armagh
- Diocese: Diocese of Connor
- Parish: St Thomas

Clergy
- Rector: Rev. Paul Jack

St Thomas' Church is a church of the Church of Ireland in south Belfast, Northern Ireland. It is located at the end of Eglantine Avenue at the junction with the Lisburn Road and holds regular services. The parish extends from Elmwood Avenue to Adelaide Park, and from the Malone Road to the Lisburn Road.

== History ==
The part of Belfast south of Queen's University between the Malone and Lisburn roads, known as the 'Malone Ridge', underwent rapid expansion from the middle of the 19th century, as a prosperous and fashionable suburb of large detached villas and grand terraces. At the time, the Church of Ireland presence in this area was limited to the old Malone Church, as well as Christ Church in College Square, neither of which was deemed an appropriate place of worship.

Following a generous bequest by Andrew Thomas McClean for the endowment and construction of a new parish church, the architect John Lanyon of Lanyon, Lynn and Lanyon was appointed in 1866. Building work, by Messrs. Lowry and Son, commenced in 1869 and St Thomas's was consecrated on 22 December 1870.

== Architecture ==

St Thomas' Church was designed by architect John Lanyon, and completed in 1870. In the same year, Lanyon's firm completed Belfast Castle. Other notable examples of their then recent work in the city included Clarence Place in May Street (now occupied by Lambert Smith Hampton), Moore and Weinberg's warehouse in present-day Donegall Square North (now housing the Linen Hall Library) and the main building at Queen's University (now called the Lanyon Building).

St Thomas's is one of the grandest and most fully finished examples of High Victorian Gothic ecclesiastical architecture, not only in Belfast, but in Ulster. Built of white Scrabo sandstone with finely dressed masonry round doors and windows, it is adorned with red sandstone banding and coloured marble discs and colonnettes to the tower and spire. The exterior is a confident exercise in eclectic design: generally the style is Early French Gothic, but the polychrome effects point to an Italian Gothic influence. There may also be an Early Christian Irish reference in the round stone-capped stair turret. The date 1870 is inscribed over the north doorway. Probably because of constraints imposed by the sloping site, the orientation of St Thomas' is unusual, the chancel facing north. In 1888 the church was enlarged at the south end, to a John Lanyon design, when the southwest porch was added, as well as the internal gallery with its Gothic timber stairway. Along with the increase in the length of nave and aisles, this extended the seating capacity to over 1,000.

=== Internal features ===
The interior with its tall, open timber-trussed roof is decorated with string courses and brickwork of contrasting colour, as well as carvings and mosaics. Elegant features, such as the narrow Gothic windows in the chancel and the slender timber trusses, mingle with the robustly carved foliage which adorns the capitals to the nave columns and the black-banded red brick arcade itself.

The capital above the pulpit with its four heads of angels is more delicately executed than the rest and is the only one on which figures appear. Carvings of the symbols of the four Evangelists – man, lion, ox and eagle – can be seen in the chancel next to the windows of Saints Matthew, Mark, Luke and John, which flank St Thomas and St Paul in the two central lancets and there is finely carved tracery on the wall panels as well as on the oak altar. The stone pulpit is fairly heavy in style but elaborately ornamented. Attractive original wrought iron light fittings are still in use in the nave. Eight modern roundels on the chancel wall to the left and right of the altar are symbolic representations of aspects of the Holy Communion.

There are many very fine stained-glass windows throughout the Church, about 45 windows and panels in all.

Much of the pre-war glass is by Heaton, Butler and Bayne of London. The greater number of the windows depict scenes from the life of Christ and familiar Biblical passages, such as the Parable of the Sower and the Parable of the Talents. The Resurrection also figures prominently. A plan of the windows, with explanations, is available in the church.

The Hill organ of 1874 was enlarged by its builder in 1906, but has remained essentially unaltered since then, which makes it an instrument of considerable and national significance.

St Thomas' in winter.

The peal of eight bells in the tower was presented by Robert Atkinson of Beaumont, Malone Road, in 1870.

In 2008 the church underwent a significant refurbishment by Killowen Contracts, following designs made by architects Consarc Design Group.

=== Rectory ===
The adjacent rectory was also designed by Lanyon, Lynn and Lanyon and built in 1871. A fine red brick residence, this is also decorated with bands of contrasting colour. Above the front door is an attractive sandstone carving of an angel playing a lute.

The most recent rector is the Reverend Paul Jack.
