= Clandeboye massacre =

- Part of the Tudor conquest of Ireland
- Location: 54.596°N 5.93°W; Belfast
- Date: November 1574
- Deaths: 200
- Perpetrator: forces of Lord Essex

The Clandeboye massacre in 1574 was a massacre of the O'Neills of Lower Clandeboye by the English forces of Walter Devereux, 1st Earl of Essex. It took place during an attempted English colonisation of Ulster as part of the Tudor conquest of Ireland. The Lord of Lower Clandeboye, Sir Brian McPhelim O'Neill, had violently opposed these attempts at colonisation. O'Neill would invite Lord Essex to parley at his castle in Belfast; however, at the end of the feast, the English forces turned on the O'Neills and killed up to 200 of them including women and children. Essex ordered that O'Neill, his wife and brother be seized and executed for treason and for opposing the plantations.

== Background ==
Sir Brian McPhelim O'Neill (Irish: Sir Brian mac Feidhlimidh Ó Néill) claimed the title of Lord of Lower Clandeboye, a túath or Gaelic territory in the province of Ulster in the north of Ireland. Lower Clandeboye covered a large part of what later became County Antrim in the east of Ulster. This claim was backed up against rival claimants by his acknowledgment as ruler by the Crown and he had been knighted in 1568 for service to the Crown.

In 1571, however, Queen Elizabeth I authorised a privately funded plantation (colonisation) of eastern Ulster, and privately granted large portions of both Lower and Upper Clandeboye to two Englishmen: Sir Thomas Smith and the 1st Earl of Essex. Smith and a band of colonists (or "adventurers") landed on the Ards Peninsula in 1572 and attempted to build a colony, but were thwarted by O'Neill, who set about razing buildings in the area to deny them shelter.

In 1573, Lord Essex landed in Carrickfergus with another band of colonists and 1,200 soldiers. They too met opposition from O'Neill and made little headway. Essex seized some of O'Neill's cattle and there were small skirmishes. O'Neill and other Irish lords "shrewdly asserted" that Essex was acting of his own will and that his actions were not backed by the Queen. In October 1574, Essex wrote to the Queen that "since this people have refused your mercy, and taken upon them wilful war and rebellion, I trust to be the instrument, under you, to punish their breach of faith".

== Massacre ==
In November 1574, O'Neill invited Lord Essex to parley and feast at Belfast Castle in Belfast, which at that time was a small town or village. This castle stood in what is now the centre of Belfast. The gathering was said to have lasted for three days. Then, without warning, English forces under the command of Lord Essex attacked the O'Neills, killing up to 200 people. Lord Essex also ordered his men to seize Sir Brian O'Neill, his wife and his brother Rory Óg. They were sent to Dublin and executed for treason.

According to Lord Essex, he had been told by "persons of credit" that O'Neill planned to betray him, and so "with the advice and consents of all the captains in the camp", he gave the order to arrest O'Neill. Lord Essex wrote that "resistance was offered by his men lodged in the town and 125 of them were slain". In another letter he wrote that he arrested O'Neill and "certain of the principal persons, and put others to the sword, to the number of 200 in all places, whereof forty were his best horsemen". According to the Annals of the Four Masters, women and youths were also killed in the massacre. Audrey Horning writes that "In violating the rules of hospitality, Essex not only inflicted maximum humiliation on O'Neill through his disdain of Irish custom; he also sent an aggressive message to the Gaelic leadership".

== Aftermath ==
The Irish annals state that the "wicked and treacherous" massacre "was a sufficient cause of hatred and disgust of the English to the Irish". English officials in Ireland were also troubled by the massacre. Shortly after, Lord Essex issued a proclamation justifying his actions. He countered charges that O'Neill had been under protection at the time of his arrest. He listed O'Neill's past breaches of trust in dealing with Crown officials, although he admitted that O'Neill had been pardoned of these offences.

In 1574, Brian McPhelim was hanged for opposing the local plantations. Essex's additional justification for O'Neill's execution were allegations that he, in collusion with the MacDonnells of Antrim, had been plotting to cut the throats of English soldiers in his territory.

In reaction to the execution, Brian's son-in-law Hugh O'Neill withdrew any association with him by annulling his marriage to Brian's daughter on grounds of consanguinity.

The following summer, Lord Essex ordered an attack on the MacDonnells of Antrim, in which his forces massacred 600 men, women and children on Rathlin Island. After Sir Brian O'Neill's death, Lord Essex promoted Brian McPhelim's son-in-law, Neill McBrian Fertagh O'Neill, to the lordship of Upper Clandeboye above the other claimants. The inter-familial disputes that arose between rival claimants led the Lord Deputy, Sir John Perrot, to divide both Lower and Upper Clandeboye between the competing members of the Clandeboye O'Neills in 1584.

== In popular culture ==
The massacre was the subject of the poem "The Betrayal of Clannabuidhe" by Irish poet Ethna Carbery (1864–1902).

== See also ==
- Glencoe Massacre, a similar incident in Scotland
- Rathlin Island Massacre
- Massacre of Mullaghmast
- Treachery of the Long Knives
