= Cliftonville (disambiguation) =

Cliftonville is a coastal town in Kent, England. The name may also refer to:

- Cliftonville, Belfast, an electoral ward of North Belfast, Northern Ireland
- Cliftonville, an area of Coatbridge, Scotland
- Cliftonville, Hove, a Victorian residential development within what is now Hove, East Sussex
- Cliftonville F.C., an Irish League football club.
- Cliftonville Hockey Club, a hockey club in Belfast
- Cliftonville Golf Club, a golf club in Belfast
