= Blackstaff River =

River in Belfast, Northern Ireland

Coordinates: 54.58074°N 5.96326°W

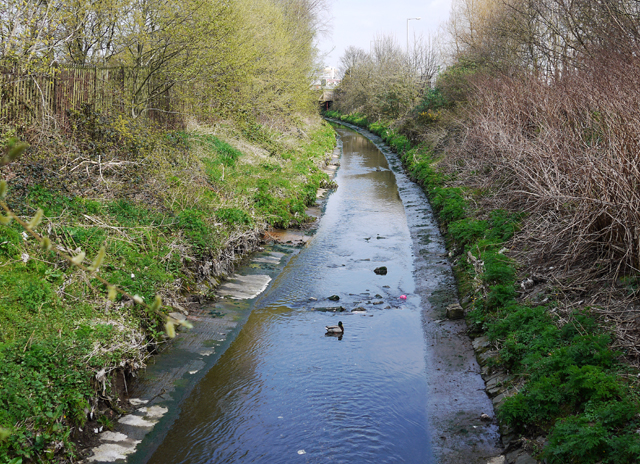
An uncovered stretch of the river near the Boucher Road

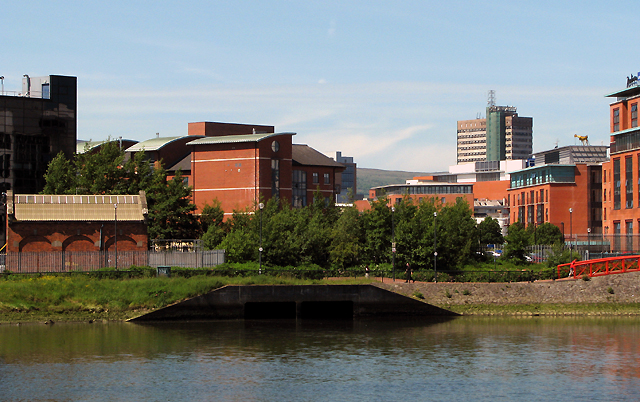
The culverted mouth of the Blackstaff at the Belfast Gasworks

The Blackstaff River is a watercourse in County Antrim, Northern Ireland. It rises on the eastern slope of the Black Mountain before flowing down into the Bog Meadows and passing under the city of Belfast, where it enters the River Lagan. Much of its course has been culverted and built upon since the 19th century, making it largely invisible today. Its tributaries include the Forth or Clowney River, which meets it beneath the Broadway Roundabout in West Belfast.

== History ==
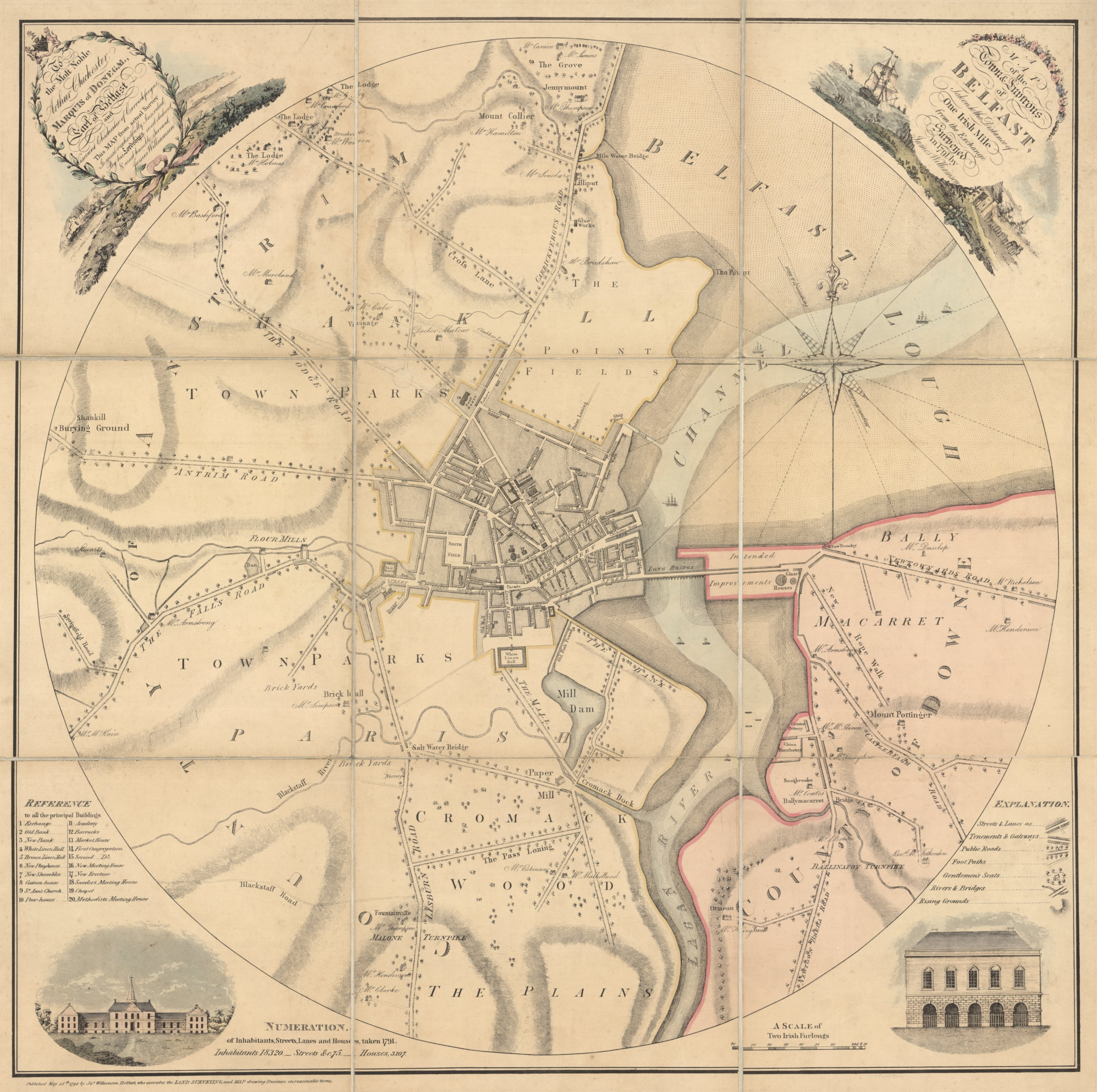
A 1791 map of Belfast showing the course of the Blackstaff and the situation of Joy's Paper Mill

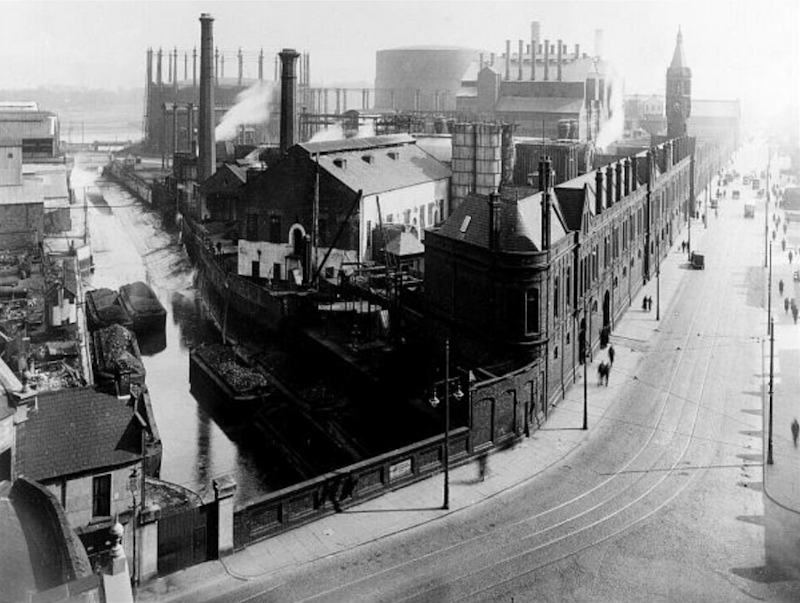
The Gasworks in 1935, when the lower reach of the Blackstaff was still uncovered

The Blackstaff's name probably references a primitive crossing formed from blackened beams of oak. It was known in Irish as the Abhainn Bheara or Owenvarra, meaning "river of the staff". In earlier times the Blackstaff flowed into the Lagan immediately above the present-day Queen's Bridge at what is now Victoria Square, and formed a wide, muddy estuary that extended as far up as Sandy Row. Here, it was spanned by a stone crossing called the Saltwater Bridge, which stood where the Boyne Bridge stands today. In the 17th century the situation of the Blackstaff became a problem for the newly built town of Belfast, which found its potential for expansion limited by the mud flats on its southern side. A variety of improvements were made in the succeeding years. A new channel was cut at the river's mouth to allow boats to reach a wharf at Belfast Castle, and in the 1690s the river was diverted through a cutting in Cromac Wood, at what is now the Gasworks. This work, commissioned by the Earl of Donegall during a lean period in order to provide relief for local labourers, allowed development to commence on the southern side of Ann Street, the original limit of the town.

In 1767, Henry Joy (whose family published the Belfast Newsletter) purchased a parcel of land at Cromac in order to build a paper mill, which would be powered by the Blackstaff. The original outlet of the river was turned into a mill dam, giving additional power to the mill. The dam was later drained and developed into the Markets district of the city, while the paper mill closed in the 1850s. The Gasworks here opened in 1823 and continued to operate until the 1980s, when the site was converted into a business park and the section of the Blackstaff that ran through it was culverted.

The Blackstaff remained open until the late 19th century, but became increasingly foul and polluted. In 1881, an article in the Newsletter complained that the river had gone from being "little more polluted than a mountain burn" to "the greatest eyesore in the town", and proposed a system of culverts to hide it from view. This work was accomplished in the succeeding decade, and the river was buried beneath the city. Much like the neighbouring Farset, the Blackstaff is now largely invisible, although there are still unculverted sections along the Boucher Road in the west of the city.

== Maintenance and flooding ==
The Blackstaff is a "designated watercourse" of the Department for Infrastructure, and is controlled and maintained by the Rivers Agency. It has been cited as a main contributor to the high flood risk in central and low-lying areas of Belfast. In particular on 16 August 2008, a newly opened underpass carrying the M1 motorway onto the A12 Westlink controversially flooded to a depth of 20 feet (6.1 m) during heavy rain with water from the culverted Blackstaff and Clowney Rivers.
