= Rathlin Island massacre =

1575 English massacre of Scottish and Irish

Bruce's Cave, one of Rathlin Island's caves, etching by Mrs. Catherine Gage (1851)

The Rathlin Island massacre took place on Rathlin Island, off the coast of what is now Northern Ireland, on 26 July 1575, when more than 600 Scots and Irish, retainers of MacDonnells of Antrim, were killed by English Crown forces under the command of Francis Drake and John Norreys.

== Sanctuary attacked ==
Rathlin Island was used as a sanctuary because of its natural defences and rocky shores; when the wind blew from the west in earlier times it was almost impossible to land. It was also respected as a hiding place, as it was the one-time abode of St. Columba. Installing themselves in Rathlin Castle, the MacDonnells of Antrim had made Rathlin their base for expanding their control over the north-eastern coast of Ireland in direct conflict with the local Irish and English resulting in several campaigns to expel them from Ireland. Their military leader, Sorley Boy MacDonnell (Scottish Gaelic: Somhairle Buidhe Mac Domhnaill), and other Scots had thought it prudent to send their wives, children, elderly, and sick to Rathlin Island for safety.

Acting on the instructions of Henry Sidney and the Earl of Essex, Francis Drake and John Norreys (or Norris) took the castle by storm. Drake used two cannons to batter the castle and when the walls gave in, Norreys ordered a direct attack on 25 July, and the Garrison surrendered. Norreys set the terms of surrender, whereupon the constable, his family, and one of the hostages were given safe passage and all other defending soldiers were killed, and on 26 July 1575, Norreys' forces hunted the old, sick, very young and women who were hiding in the caves. Despite the surrender, they killed all the 200 defenders and more than 400 civilian men, women and children. Drake was also charged with the task of preventing any Scottish reinforcement vessels reaching the Island.

The entire family of Sorley Boy MacDonnell perished in the massacre. Essex, who ordered the killings, boasted in a letter to Francis Walsingham, the Queen's secretary and spymaster, that Sorley Boy MacDonnell watched the massacre from the mainland helplessly and was "like to run mad from sorrow".

== Aftermath ==
Norreys stayed on the island and tried to rebuild the walls of the castle so that the English might use the structure as a fortress. As Drake was not paid to defend the island, he departed with his ships. Norreys realised that it was not possible to defend the island without intercepting Scottish galleys and he returned to Carrickfergus in September 1575.

== See also ==
- List of massacres in Ireland
- List of conflicts in Ireland
- Betrayal of Clannabuidhe
- Massacre of Mullaghmast
