= Bog Meadows =

Nature reserve in Belfast, Northern Ireland

Coordinates: 54.584°N 5.966°W

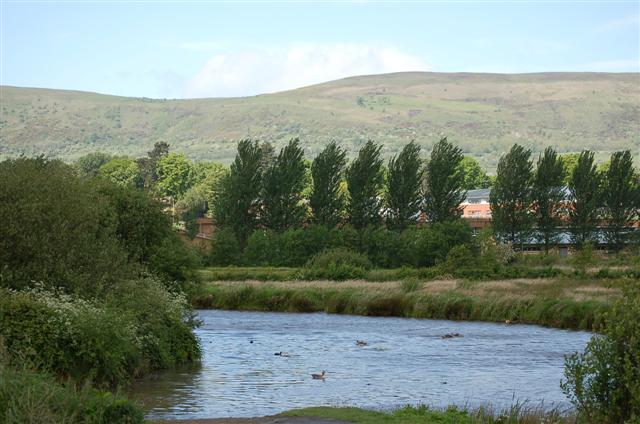
Bog Meadows

Bog Meadows is an area on the outskirts of west Belfast of 47 acres of grassland and woodland managed by the Ulster Wildlife Trust - grid reference: J3172. The M1 motorway passes through this area. To the west of the area lies Milltown Cemetery and St. Louise's Comprehensive College. To the east of the motorway is the Boucher Road area now mostly drained land with industrial units in the grounds along with underdeveloped areas. It is drained by the Blackstaff River.

== Wildlife records ==
Flora: Ophioglossum vulgatum (adder's tongue), Rorippa palustris (marsh yellow cress), Sagina nodosa (knotted pearlwort), Carex pseudocyperus (cyperus sedge), Carex pendula, Carex strigosa, Glyceria plicata, and Bromus racemosus (smooth brome).

Fauna: Insects and sticklebacks are common along the drainage channels along with frogs, smooth newts. The birds recorded include coot, little grebe, Eurasian teal, mallard, tufted duck and moorhen are to be found on the open water along with grey heron, water rail and snipe at the water's edge. Other small birds such as European goldfinch, common reed bunting, European stonechat, and sedge warbler have also been recorded.

== Further references ==
- Dean, C.Douglas. The Ulster Countryside. 1983. Century Books.
- Ulster Wildlife Trust
- O'Reilly, Des. "The Bog Meadows and the River Blackstaff". 2008. Stranmillis University College, Belfast.
- Bog Meadows Nature Reserve. in The Irish Hare. Ulster Wildlife's Membership Magazine. Issue 114 pp. 6–7. Winter 2016
