= Lanyon, Lynn and Lanyon =

Architectural firm

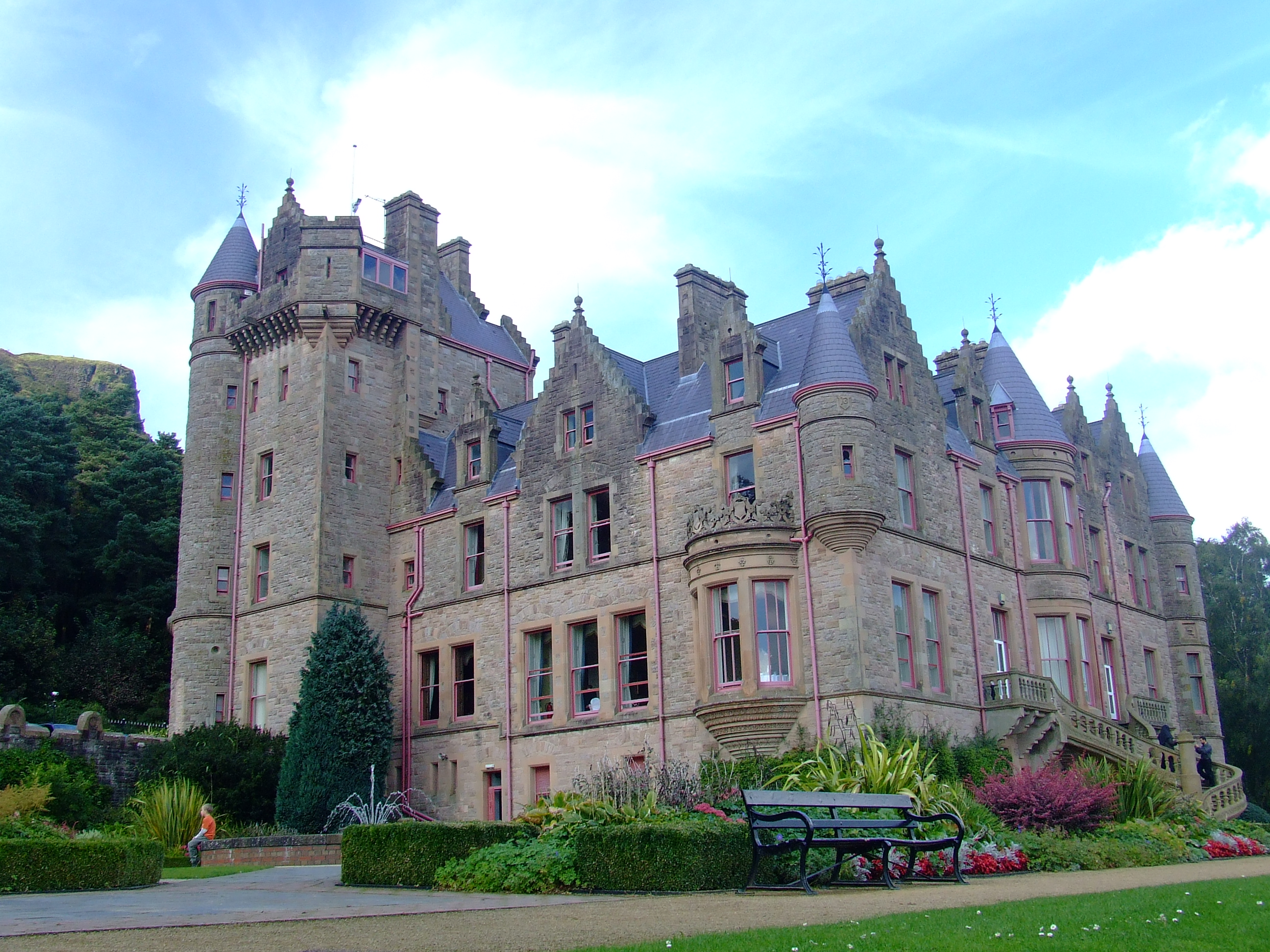
Belfast Castle, designed by Lanyon, Lynn & Lanyon

Lanyon, Lynn & Lanyon, Civil Engineers and Architects was a 19th-century firm working mainly in Dublin and Belfast, and the leading architectural firm in Belfast during the 1860s. Its partners were Charles Lanyon, William Henry Lynn, and Charles' son John Lanyon.

Charles Lanyon was the head of the firm and its most famous architect. In 1854, he took Lynn, his former apprentice, into partnership. Their projects included the "Lombardic" Gothic-style Sinclair Seaman's Presbyterian Church in Belfast, and the Venetian Gothic banks at Newtownards, County Down, and Dungannon, County Tyrone.

Lanyon, Lynn & Lanyon was created when John Lanyon became junior partner in 1860. The partnership with Lynn was dissolved in 1872.

== Projects ==
Designs for buildings and other projects by Lanyon, Lynn & Lanyon include:

Building	Date	Location	Style and remarks
Sion Mill	1853	Sion Mills, County Tyrone	linen mill
Sandford Road Church of Ireland		Ranelagh, Dublin	first Dublin commission for the firm
Unitarian Church	1861–1863	St. Stephen's Green, Dublin	described in Lynn's obituary as "the best example extant of a modern Gothic church on a narrow street frontage"
St. Andrew's Church	1862–1866	St Andrew Street, Dublin	"an ambitious Gothic church on a cramped site"
Chester Town Hall	1862–1869	Chester	"Lynn, seemingly ignoring the request for an 'economical' building, incorporated numerous fancy Gothic features and utilised two types of local sandstone, pink and grey"
Belfast Castle	1862–1870	Cavehill Country Park, Belfast	Scottish Baronial style in sandstone, with "striking" serpentine Italianate stairway; cost overruns and the family's depleted fortune delayed completion
West Church	1863	Ballymoney Road, Ballymena	black basalt in Decorated Gothic style; gutted by fire in 1926 and restored
Charles Sheils Buildings	1868	Downpatrick, County Down	series of almshouses with a bell tower
Clarence Place Hall		May Street, Belfast	style has been compared to Chester Town Hall; photo
Linen warehouse for Moore and Weinberg	1864	16–18 Donegall Square, North Belfast	yellow-grey brick, with interior said to be "specially arranged for carrying on the linen business in all departments"; now Linen Hall Library
St. Thomas Church	1869–1870	Belfast	"one of the grandest and most fully finished examples of High Victorian Gothic ecclesiastical architecture"; white sandstone decorated with red sandstone bands and colored marble discs and colonnettes; a notice of the laying of the foundation stone defines the style as "Gothic, of the Early French period"
Dowdstown House	1870	near Navan in Leinster	described as using "many of the picturesque tricks" characteristic of the firm
Portrush Town Hall	1870–1872	corner of Mark and Kerr, Portrush, County Antrim	"immensely vigorous high-Victorian building" with a "hotch-potch of styles"; Scottish Baronial with crow-stepped gables and "witch's hat" turret; red brick with bands of cream and black brickwork

== Sources ==
- Gillian McClelland and Diana Hadden, Pioneering Women: Riddel Hall and Queen's University Belfast (Ulster Historical Foundation, 2005), p. 193 online.
- Antonia Brody, Directory of British Architects 1834-1914: L-Z (Continuum International Publishing Group, 2001), pp. 15–16 and 89 online.
- Dictionary of Scottish Architects, Architect Biography Report, Lanyon, Lynn & Lanyon
