= Belfast Castle =

Castle on the slopes of Cave Hill Country Park in Belfast, Northern Ireland

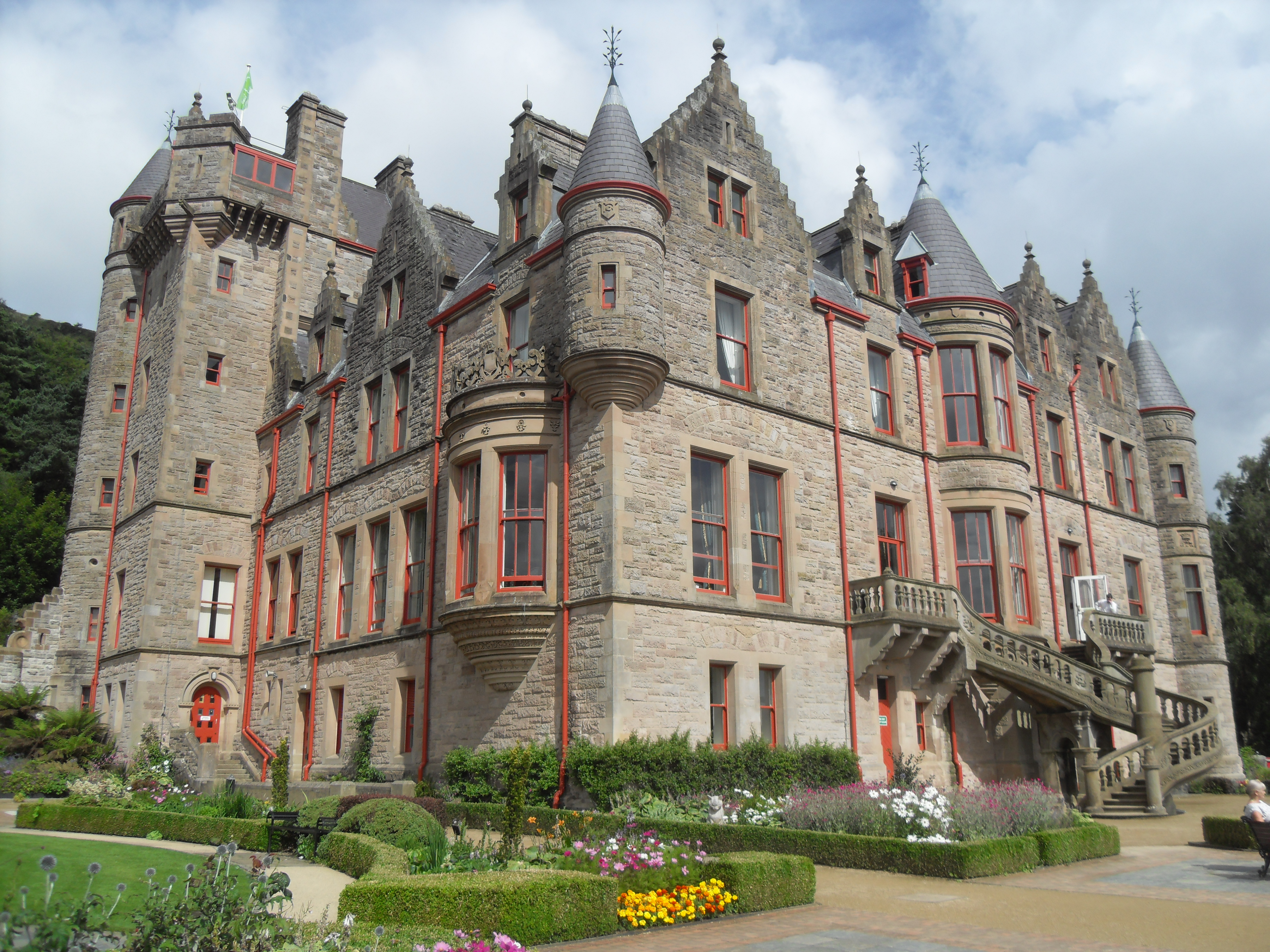
- The current Belfast Castle, which was constructed in the late 1860s
- Interactive map of Belfast Castle
- 54.6428°N 5.9422°W
- Location: The lower slopes of Cave Hill on the County Antrim side of Belfast, Northern Ireland

History
- Built: 1867–1870; 156 years ago
- Built for: The 3rd Marquess of Donegall
- Original use: Country house

Site notes
- Architect: Lanyon, Lynn and Lanyon
- Architectural style: Victorian Scots Baronial
- Current use: Restaurant, coffee shop and event venue
- Owner: Belfast City Council
- Website: belfastcastle.co.uk

Listed Building – Grade A
- Reference no.: HB26/51/001A

Belfast Castle (Irish: Caisleán Bhéal Feirste) is a mansion located in Cave Hill Country Park in Belfast, Northern Ireland, in a prominent position 400 feet (120 m) above sea level. Its location provides unobstructed views over the City of Belfast and Belfast Lough. There have been several structures called "Belfast Castle" over the centuries, located on different sites. The current "castle" is a Victorian structure that was built between 1867 and 1870 on the slopes of Cave Hill, and it is Grade A listed. The main entrance into the Belfast Castle Demesne is now where Innisfayle Park meets Downview Park West, just off the Antrim Road (part of the A6). The original main entrance into the current demesne was formerly on the Antrim Road itself, where Strathmore Park now meets the Antrim Road.

== History ==
=== Medieval and Early Modern Castle ===
There have been several structures called "Belfast Castle" over the centuries; not all of these structures have been on the same site. In fact, all the earlier structures called Belfast Castle were on a completely different site, and in a completely different area of Belfast, from the current Belfast Castle. Originally, a castle had been erected at Béal Feirste (Belfast) by the 1220s, probably to guard the important ford across the River Lagan. This medieval castle may have been built by the Normans, who invaded East Ulster in the late twelfth century. These Norman invaders carved out a territory for themselves which was centred on Carrickfergus, this territory later becoming known as the Earldom of Ulster.

By 1333, a small settlement is thought to have developed around the castle at Belfast. This original "Belfast Castle", located on what later became the County Antrim side of the River Lagan, was probably in the area now bounded by Donegall Place, Castle Place, Cornmarket, and Castle Lane in the centre of what is now Belfast City Centre. Although originally built in either the late twelfth-century or the early thirteenth-century, this castle was "rebuilt" on several occasions between the 1220s and the 1550s, possibly being "rebuilt" on the same site or on an adjacent site. This original, medieval castle was almost certainly on, or very near, the same site as the much later "Plantation-era" castle developed for Lord Chichester.

This original High Medieval, Late Medieval and Early Modern castle site was on the southern bank of the River Farset (which now flows beneath High Street), being located on a sliver of land that was bounded by the Farset to the north and the River Owenvara (Blackstaff River) to the south. Both the River Farset and the River Owenvara (Irish: Abhainn Bheara, meaning "River of the Staff", usually known nowadays in English as the Blackstaff River) emptied into the River Lagan just to the east of this castle site.

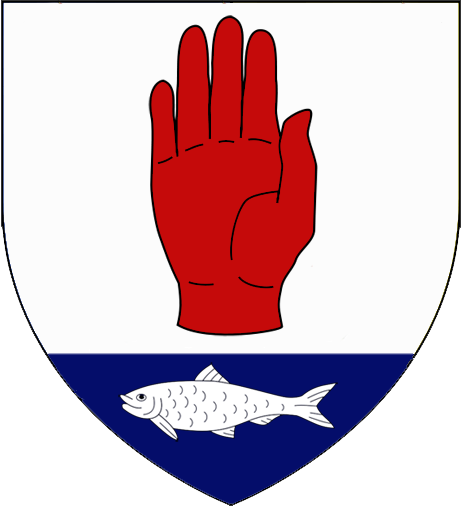
Arms of the Uí Néill of Clandeboye.

The medieval Belfast Castle was eventually seized by a branch of the powerful Uí Néill (O'Neill) dynasty of the Cénel nEógain, probably at the end of the fourteenth-century or the beginning of the fifteenth century. The Uí Néill almost certainly had Belfast Castle rebuilt at some stage, probably as a Gaelic towerhouse, either building on the same site as the Norman castle or else building their towerhouse very near to that site. This branch of the Uí Néill carved out a túath or Gaelic territory for themselves in South Antrim and North Down, this túath soon becoming known as Clann Aedha Buídhe (Clandeboye). The Uí Néill of Clandeboye maintained Belfast Castle as one of their main residences, with the castle and its surrounding túath largely remaining in their hands throughout the fifteenth and sixteenth centuries, with a few brief exceptions.

The castle was briefly taken in 1476 by Éinri mac Eoghain Ó Néill (known in English as Henry O'Neill), Rí na Tír Eoghain (King of Tyrone), usually known during his lifetime as "the Great O'Neill", when he "attacked the castle of Belfast which he took and demolished". The rebuilt castle was again briefly seized from the Uí Néill of Clandeboye in 1489, this time by Aodh Ruadh Ó Domhnaill I (Red Hugh O'Donnell I), Rí na Tír Chonaill (King of Tír Chonaill), an immensely powerful Gaelic ruler from the west of Ulster. Ó Domhnaill, whose chief residence was Donegal Castle in Donegal Town, had invaded Clandeboye with his army and "took and demolished the Castle of Belfast, and then returned safe to his house loaded with immense spoils".

In the early sixteenth-century, Belfast Castle was seized on three occasions by two senior-ranking members of the House of Kildare, part of the wider Geraldine dynasty. The castle was briefly occupied twice by the forces of The 8th Earl of Kildare, the Lord Deputy of Ireland and the leading Geraldine at the time. Lord Kildare seized the castle and sacked Belfast in 1503 and again in 1512. His son and heir, The 9th Earl of Kildare (often known as Gearóid Óg), also seized the castle, this time in 1523. Gearóid Óg, Lord Kildare, had succeeded his father as Lord Deputy of Ireland in September 1513, also succeeding his father as the Geraldine leader at the same time. After briefly taking Belfast Castle from Aodh Ó Néill (Hugh O'Neill), Lord of Clandeboye, in 1523, this Lord Kildare reported to King Henry VIII: "I brake a castell of his, called Belfast, and burned 24 myle of his country [sic]".

Belfast Castle was briefly occupied by English forces in 1552, when the castle was possibly rebuilt on the orders of Sir James Croft, who was serving as the Lord Deputy of Ireland at the time. Another occasion when Belfast Castle was briefly seized from the Uí Néill of Clandeboye was in the 1570s, when English forces, initially under the command of The 1st Earl of Essex, occupied the castle for a few years during the short-lived Enterprise of Ulster.

During the Nine Years' War in the 1590s, English forces again occupied Belfast Castle, taking it over from the Uí Néill of Clandeboye. In June 1597, the forces of Shane McBrian O'Neill, the Lord of Lower Clandeboye and son of Sir Brian mac Feidhlimidh Ó Néill, attacked the castle and overpowered its English garrison, summarily executing all the prisoners that they captured. English forces, under the command of Sir John Chichester, soon marched north to retake Belfast Castle from the Uí Néill of Clandeboye, which they did in July 1597. Chichester reported back to his superiors that his forces had retaken the castle "without anie loss to us, and put those wee found in yt to the sworde [sic]". Chichester then placed Belfast Castle and its surrounding settlement under the command of Sir Ralph Lane, the Elizabethan adventurer. Lane, the then Muster Master-General, had previously served, over a decade earlier, as Governor of the ill-fated Roanoke Colony in what is now North Carolina.

Sir John Chichester, who had been appointed as Governor of Carrickfergus Castle, soon fell out with the previously neutral MacDonnells of the Glens. In a battle fought in November 1597 against the MacDonnells at Altfrackyn (also known as Aldfreck), a townland just north of Ballycarry, an English force was overpowered and suffered 180 men killed. Chichester was killed by the MacDonnells during or immediately after this battle, possibly by being beheaded. Sir John Chichester was the fifth son of Sir John Chichester of North Devon, and he was the younger brother of The 1st Baron Chichester.

=== Clandeboye Massacre ===
In October 1574, during the Enterprise of Ulster, The 1st Earl of Essex and his retinue were invited to a feast at Belfast Castle by Sir Brian mac Feidhlimidh Ó Néill (Sir Brian McPhelim O'Neill), Lord of Lower Clandeboye. The feast was to celebrate a newly signed peace agreement between the English Crown and Sir Brian. After three days and nights of feasting and celebrations inside Belfast Castle, the soldiers accompanying Lord Essex suddenly set upon and killed most of the family and retainers of Sir Brian inside the castle. It seems this massacre was ordered by Essex himself. This event is usually known as the Clandeboye Massacre. The castle was then seized by Essex and his forces. Sir Brian mac Feidhlimidh Ó Néill was not killed during this massacre. Instead, Sir Brian, along with his wife and his brother, were arrested by Lord Essex and, later in 1574, all three were executed in Dublin.

=== Plantation Castle ===

Arms of The 1st Baron Chichester (1563–1625). The coronet of a baron can be seen above the escutcheon.

By 1603, Belfast Castle, which was probably a Gaelic towerhouse by this time, was in ruins, largely as a result of the Nine Years' War. In July 1603, Sir Arthur Chichester (1563–1625; later created, in 1613, The 1st Baron Chichester), then Governor of Carrickfergus Castle, offered to rebuild Belfast Castle if he was "granted" Belfast and its surrounding lands by the Crown. Chichester, who had been one of the most notorious English commanders in Ireland during the Nine Years' War, received a King's letter in August 1603, which officially put him in charge of Belfast Castle and its surrounding lands. In a patent dated 5 November 1603, the Crown granted to Sir Arthur Chichester "The Castle of Bealfaste or Belfast, with the Appurtenants and Hereditaments, Spiritual and Temporal, situate in the Lower Clandeboye, late in the possession or custody of Sir Ralph Lane Knt., deceased". A new grant of the castle and its surrounding lands was made by the Crown the following year, in May 1604, again to Chichester, who would serve as Lord Deputy of Ireland between 1605 and 1616.

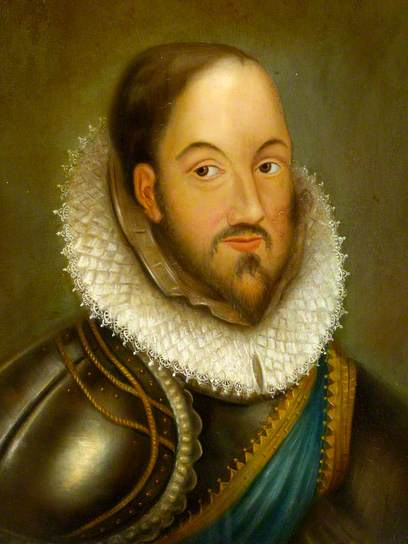
The 1st Baron Chichester, Lord Deputy of Ireland 1605-1616.

Sir Arthur Chichester was also "granted" a vast estate in Inishowen in County Donegal, over in the north-west of Ulster, in 1608 or 1609. This huge estate covered almost all of Inishowen, and had been seized by the Crown from the Ó Dochartaigh (O'Doherty) clan in the aftermath of the rebellion of Sir Cathaoir Ruadh Ó Dochartaigh (Sir Cahir Rua O'Doherty), Lord of Inishowen, in 1608. Chichester, as Lord Deputy of Ireland, ensured that the huge Ó Dochartaigh lands in Inishowen were granted to himself. However, very little of this Inishowen estate was ever run directly by the head of the Chichester family; from the early seventeenth century onwards, almost all of this vast estate was sublet by the Chichesters to several lesser landlords, often described as "middlemen", on very long-term leases. Most of this huge Inishowen estate was eventually sold off by the Chichester family via the Encumbered Estates Court in the 1850s and later in the nineteenth century.

When the head of the Chichester family was advanced in the Peerage of Ireland to being an earl in 1647, they took the title Earl of Donegall due to the family's ownership of this vast estate in Inishowen. The head of the family was further advanced in the Peerage of Ireland to being Marquess of Donegall in July 1791.

The current Arms of the senior line of the Chichester dynasty, who have been Marquesses of Donegall since 1791. The coronet of a marquess can be seen above the escutcheon.

Sir Arthur Chichester, one of the main architects of the Plantation of Ulster, had Belfast Castle largely rebuilt in the early 1610s, mainly in brick. It is almost certain that Chichester had his "Plantation" castle built on the site of the Gaelic Uí Néill towerhouse. Chichester may even have incorporated parts of the Uí Néill structure into his new castle. However, when in Ulster, Lord Chichester, as he later became, usually resided at Joymount House in nearby Carrickfergus rather than at the "Plantation-era" Belfast Castle. Lord Chichester had only one child with his wife, a son, who died in infancy. Thus, upon his own death in February 1625, Arthur, Lord Chichester, was succeeded in his estates and properties (but not in the peerage) by his younger brother Edward (1568–1648), who was created The 1st Viscount Chichester later in that same year. The Chichester family (later also known as the Donegall family) were to own the town of Belfast from around 1603 up until the early 1850s, when their Belfast estate was largely broken up and sold off.

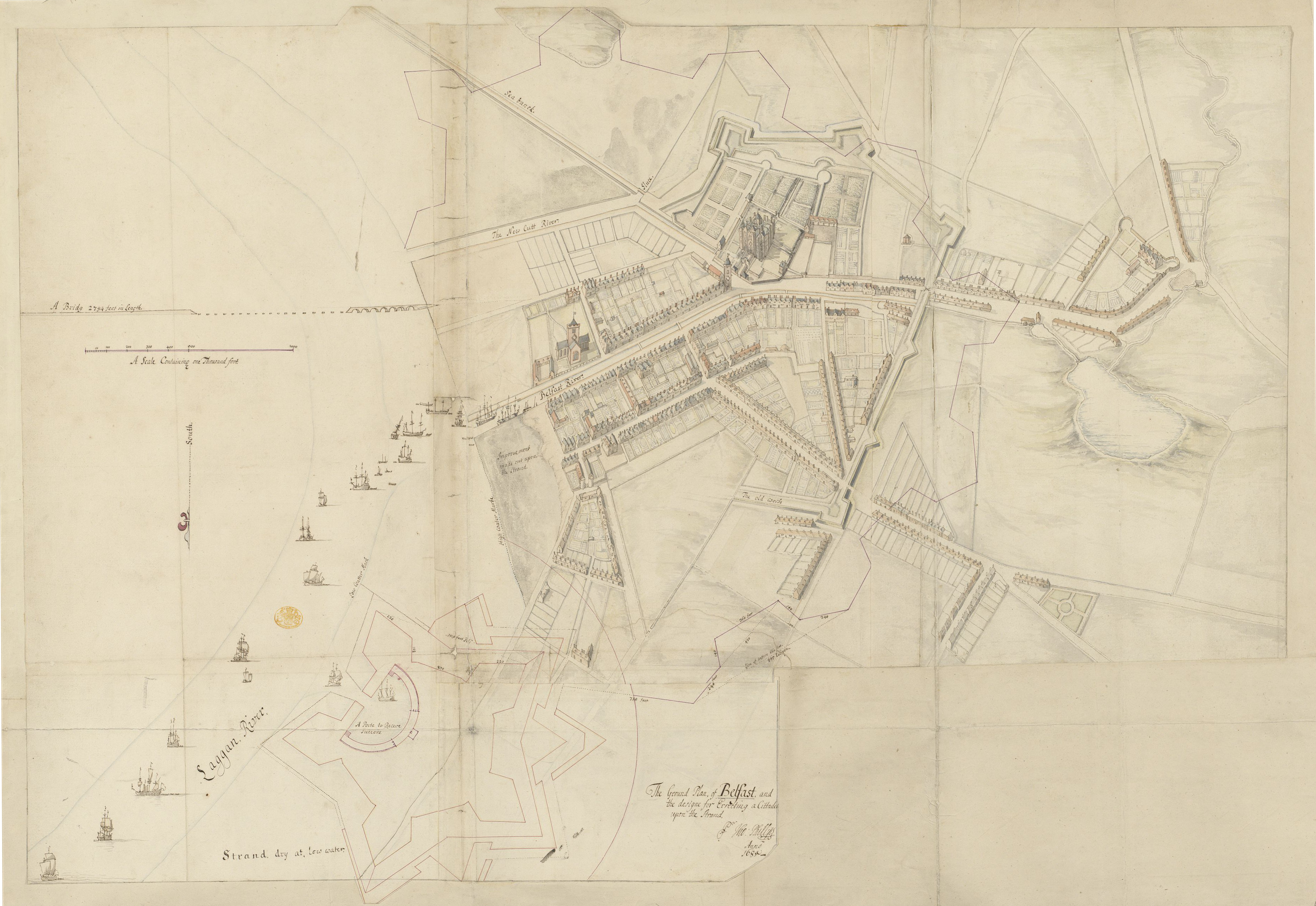
Ground plan of Belfast as drawn by Thomas Phillips, 1685. The Plantation-era Belfast Castle is depicted at the upper end of the centre of the drawing. Phillips drew Belfast upside-down, with North being at the bottom of the drawing.

On the 24 April 1708, the "Plantation-era" Belfast Castle, which had been built for Lord Chichester, accidentally burnt down, killing three sisters and one servant of The 4th Earl of Donegall (1695–1757). This castle was never rebuilt. Following this fire, the senior line of the Donegall family (also known as the Chichester family) left Belfast. The head of the Donegall family would not live in Belfast again for almost a century, until The 2nd Marquess of Donegall (1769–1844) settled in Belfast in 1802, establishing his main residence there.

=== Donegall House and Ormeau House ===
When The 2nd Marquess of Donegall settled in Belfast in 1802, what remained of the "Plantation-era" Belfast Castle had long been a ruin, having been destroyed by a fire almost a century before, in April 1708. This "Plantation" castle had almost certainly been built on, or very near, the site of the "Norman" Belfast Castle, which was the original medieval castle. It certainly seems that the "Plantation" castle was, at the very least, built on the site of the Uí Néill towerhouse, which had probably replaced the Norman castle. By 1802, these original castle sites had partially been built upon with other buildings.

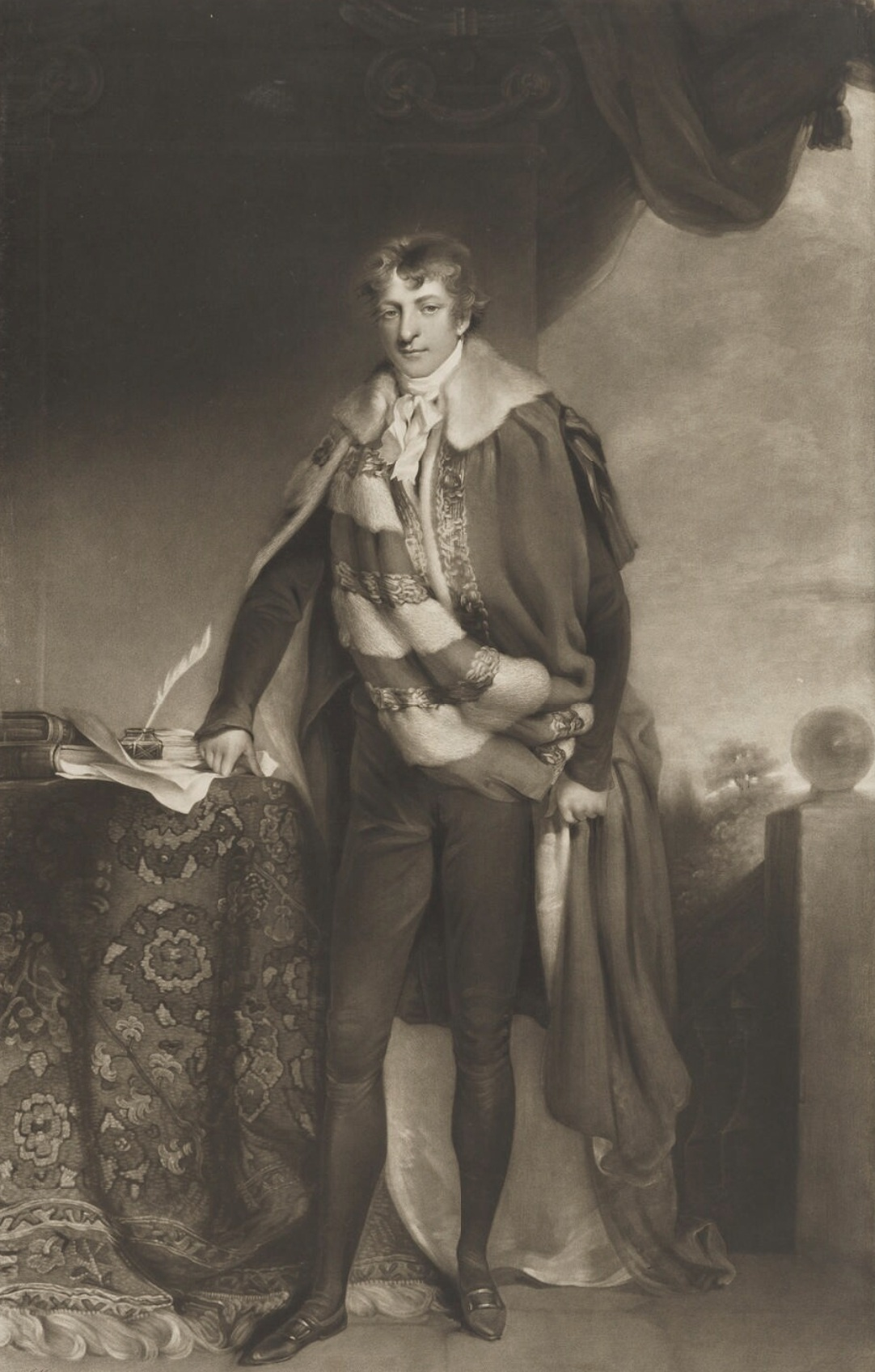
The 2nd Marquess of Donegall, pictured in the parliamentary robes of a marquess. Lord Donegall served as Lord Lieutenant of County Donegal from 1831 until his death, even though he did not live in County Donegal and rarely visited the county.

Lord Donegall thus had to find an alternative residence for himself and his family. He settled at what became known as Donegall House, a large terraced house on the corner of what is now Donegall Place and Donegall Square North, only a few hundred yards from the original site of Belfast Castle, right in the centre of the town of Belfast (it did not officially become a city until November 1888). The 2nd Marquess of Donegall became the first head of his family in almost a century to actually live in Belfast. Since 1708, the Earls and, later, Marquesses of Donegall had mainly lived over in Great Britain, usually living in London.

The 2nd Marquess of Donegall also maintained a country residence called Ormeau Cottage on the Ormeau Demesne (which later became Ormeau Park). At that time, the Ormeau Demesne was on the south-eastern edge of Belfast, being in Ballynafeigh on the County Down side of the River Lagan. In the 1820s, Lord Donegall had Ormeau Cottage greatly extended in size, turning it into a mansion called Ormeau House. This country house was built in the Tudor Revival architectural style and was designed by William Vitruvius Morrison.

Lord Donegall sold off Donegall House in the centre of Belfast in the early 1820s, establishing his main residence at Ormeau House thereafter. Donegall House was converted into being The Royal Hotel in 1824. Ormeau House, where The 2nd Marquess of Donegall died in October 1844, was eventually demolished in the late 1860s.

=== Victorian Castle ===
The 3rd Marquess of Donegall (1797–1883), in stark contrast to his father, did not spend much of his adult life living in Belfast or anywhere else in Ireland. The 3rd Marquess joined the British Army as an officer when he was a young man. After his military service was over, he mainly lived in Great Britain, where he was very involved in politics at Westminster. He was known as the Earl of Belfast, a courtesy title, between January 1799 and October 1844, when he succeeded his father in the marquessate. The 3rd Marquess would serve at Westminster as Captain of the Yeomen of the Guard from February 1848 until February 1852 in the first government of Lord John Russell, while the Great Famine was still ravaging Ireland.

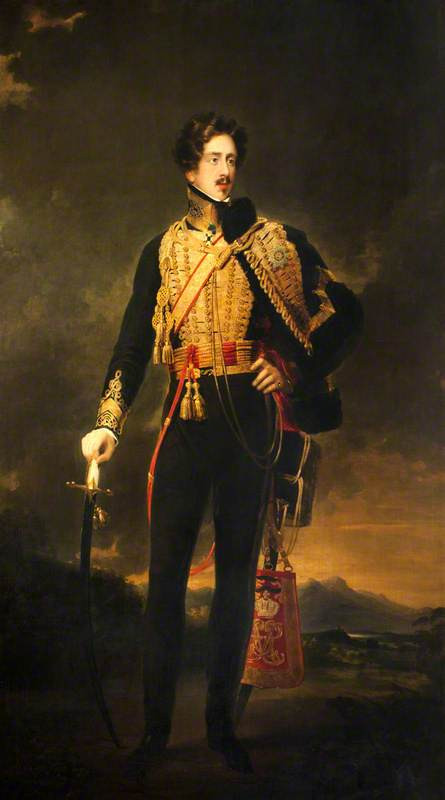
Portrait of The 3rd Marquess of Donegall wearing an officer's uniform of the 11th Hussars.

It was The 3rd Marquess of Donegall who finally sold off almost all of his family's Belfast estate in the 1850s. This left, of the "Belfast estate", only the Ormeau Demesne and most of Cave Hill in the ownership of Lord Donegall. Curiously, it was only when he no longer owned Belfast that Lord Donegall became interested in actually living there. He decided to build what has been described as a new "princely mansion" for himself in the 1860s on what was then the northern edge of Belfast, just over a decade after the Great Famine had ended. This new residence was called Belfast Castle, in a nod to family history, even though it was built on a completely different site, and in a completely different area, from the original castle site, which had been located right in the centre of Belfast. By the 1860s, nothing remained above ground of the earlier "Belfast Castles".

The new, Victorian castle was built in the Scots Baronial architectural style and was designed by the Belfast firm of Lanyon, Lynn and Lanyon. However, there is some debate over who in the firm actually designed the new Belfast Castle. Although popularly attributed to Sir Charles Lanyon, some architectural historians believe that the castle was actually designed by either his business partner, and former apprentice, W.H. Lynn, or by Sir Charles's other business partner, his son John Lanyon.

The new Belfast Castle was built on what had been the Donegall family's deer park on the slopes of Cave Hill, a location which was, at that time, on the northern outskirts of Belfast, just off the Antrim Road. The "castle" (in reality a Victorian country house) was mainly constructed between 1867 and 1870, and was built using pink Scrabo sandstone from the north of County Down, along with Giffnock sandstone dressings imported from Renfrewshire, all on a rock-faced basalt plinth. This Victorian castle, which has been described by Sir Charles Brett as "a rugged and determined exercise in the fullness of the Scottish Baronial style, perched on a highly romantic site with a superb view", remains standing and in use to the present day.

Arms of the senior line of the Ashley-Cooper dynasty, who have been Earls of Shaftesbury since 1672. The coronet of an earl can be seen above the escutcheon.

Construction cost well over the £11,000 set aside to pay for the project, forcing Lord Donegall to seek financial assistance from Baron Ashley (1831–1886), his son-in-law, in order to complete the new castle. Lord Ashley (who later became The 8th Earl of Shaftesbury) had married Lady Harriet Chichester (1836–1898), the only surviving child of Lord Donegall, in August 1857. Of Lord Donegall's three children, all by his first wife - two sons and one daughter - Lady Harriet was the only one to have had children of her own and to have outlived her father. Thus, she and her husband eventually inherited the castle and the rest of the Donegall family's vast estates in October 1883, upon the death of her father, the 3rd Marquess, while the marquessate was inherited by her elderly uncle, the former Church of Ireland Dean of Raphoe, who became The 4th Marquess of Donegall. Lord Shaftesbury, his wife Harriet, Countess of Shaftesbury, and her Chichester ancestors are commemorated in the form of Belfast street names, much like how the original castles are remembered.

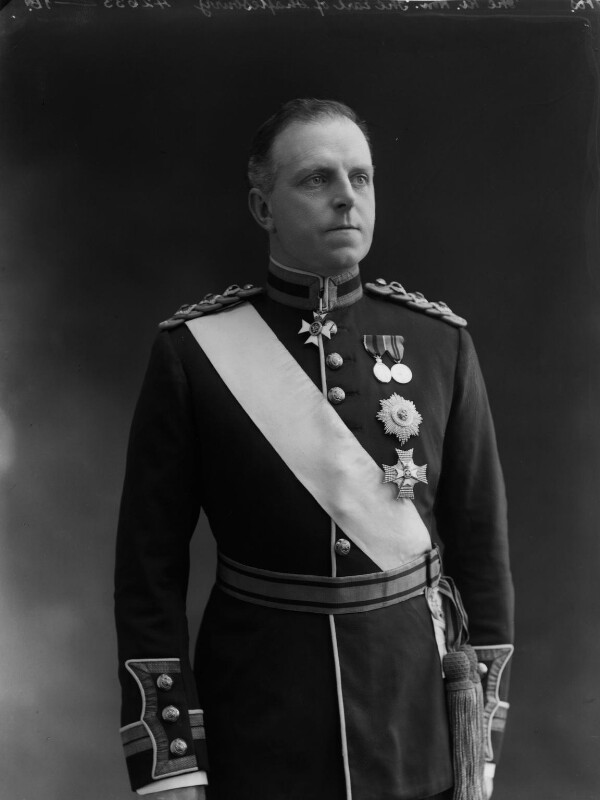
The 9th Earl of Shaftesbury, who served as Lord Mayor of Belfast 1907-1908. Lord Shaftesbury donated Belfast Castle and its surrounding demesne to Belfast Corporation in 1934.

The 8th Earl of Shaftesbury died in April 1886, only two and a half years after he and his wife had inherited Belfast Castle. He had only succeeded his famous father in the earldom in October 1885. Upon his death, the 8th Earl was succeeded by his then sixteen-year-old son, who now became The 9th Earl of Shaftesbury (1869–1961). Of all the private owners of the new Belfast Castle, the 9th Earl was to own it the longest, presiding over the castle until January 1934. A prominent Unionist, the 9th Earl was to involve himself very much in local affairs, going on to become Lord Mayor of Belfast in 1907. He also served as: Lord Lieutenant of Belfast from 1904 to 1911; Lord Lieutenant of Antrim from 1911 to 1916; and Chancellor of The Queen's University of Belfast from 1909 to 1923.

As a young man, Lord Shaftesbury spent much of his time at Belfast Castle, often living there when he was not in London. He and his wife, Constance, Countess of Shaftesbury (1875–1957), were also very involved with charitable causes in Belfast, often holding events in the grounds of Belfast Castle in order to raise money for local charities. It was Lord Shaftesbury who had the Baroque stone staircase added to the garden façade of the castle in 1894. The architect of this elaborate, serpentine outdoor staircase is unknown.

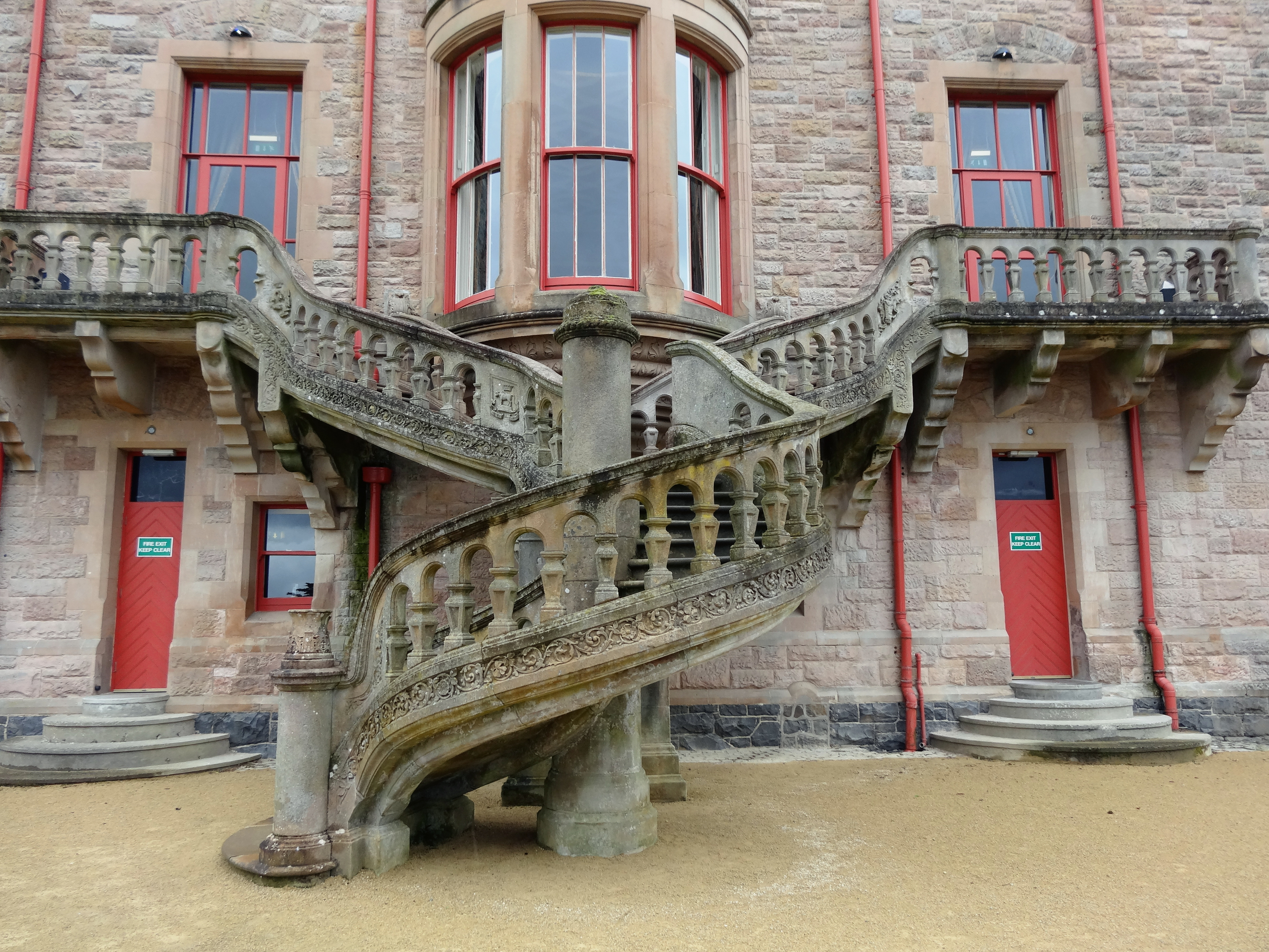
Outdoor serpentine stairs on the garden façade of Belfast Castle. The stairs were erected in 1894.

The vast country estates of the Donegall family, which had been inherited by the Shaftesbury family in October 1883, were largely broken up and sold off under The 9th Earl of Shaftesbury during the 1890s and during the first decade of the twentieth century. While the town of Belfast had been sold off by The 3rd Marquess of Donegall back in the 1850s, the Donegall family continued to own a large estate in County Antrim and large parts of Inishowen until these passed to the Shaftesburys in October 1883. Under the various Land Acts passed by the British Parliament during the 1880s, 1890s and early twentieth century (especially under the Land Purchase (Ireland) Act 1903), the huge country estates in Ireland, including those of the Shaftesbury family in Ulster, were broken up and sold off, mainly being sold to the tenant farmers who actually lived on and farmed the land.

In his later years, Lord Shaftesbury spent less and less time at Belfast Castle, particularly after the outbreak of the First World War. Running the castle became ever more of a financial burden to the Shaftesbury family, especially after what remained of their County Antrim estate was sold off, under the terms of the Land Acts, in the 1890s and the years immediately before 1914. The castle and its surrounding demesne was eventually gifted to the City of Belfast by Lord Shaftesbury in January 1934.

=== Belfast Castle and Demesne since 1934 ===
In the years after it was given to the city, there was some debate about what Belfast Castle should be used for. The publicity manager at the time felt that the castle should either be re-purposed into a tea and dance room, or perhaps a museum and art gallery with refreshment rooms.

The castle was just the beginning. The publicity manager also made plans for the grounds and demesne to include an open-air theatre, clay pigeon shooting, archery, tennis courts, bowling greens, squash courts, and mini golf. With such an ambitious project, a sub-committee estimated that the minimum possible cost would be £160,000 before considering the cost of employing grounds keepers and the cost of restoring the building.

After the Second World War, a large amount of housing was built on the lands of the Belfast Castle Demesne that bordered the Antrim Road. These housing estates, all built in the 1950s and 1960s, included Innisfayle Park, Downview Park West and Strathmore Park. The building of these housing estates greatly reduced the castle's demesne in size. To facilitate the building of this housing, almost all of the castle's demesne wall along the Antrim Road was demolished. This construction in the mid-twentieth-century left both the Chapel of the Resurrection and the former Main Gate Lodge marooned in the middle of housing estates, no longer being part of the castle's demesne.

Since 1945, the castle has been a popular venue for weddings, afternoon teas, and other such events.

== Chapel of the Resurrection ==
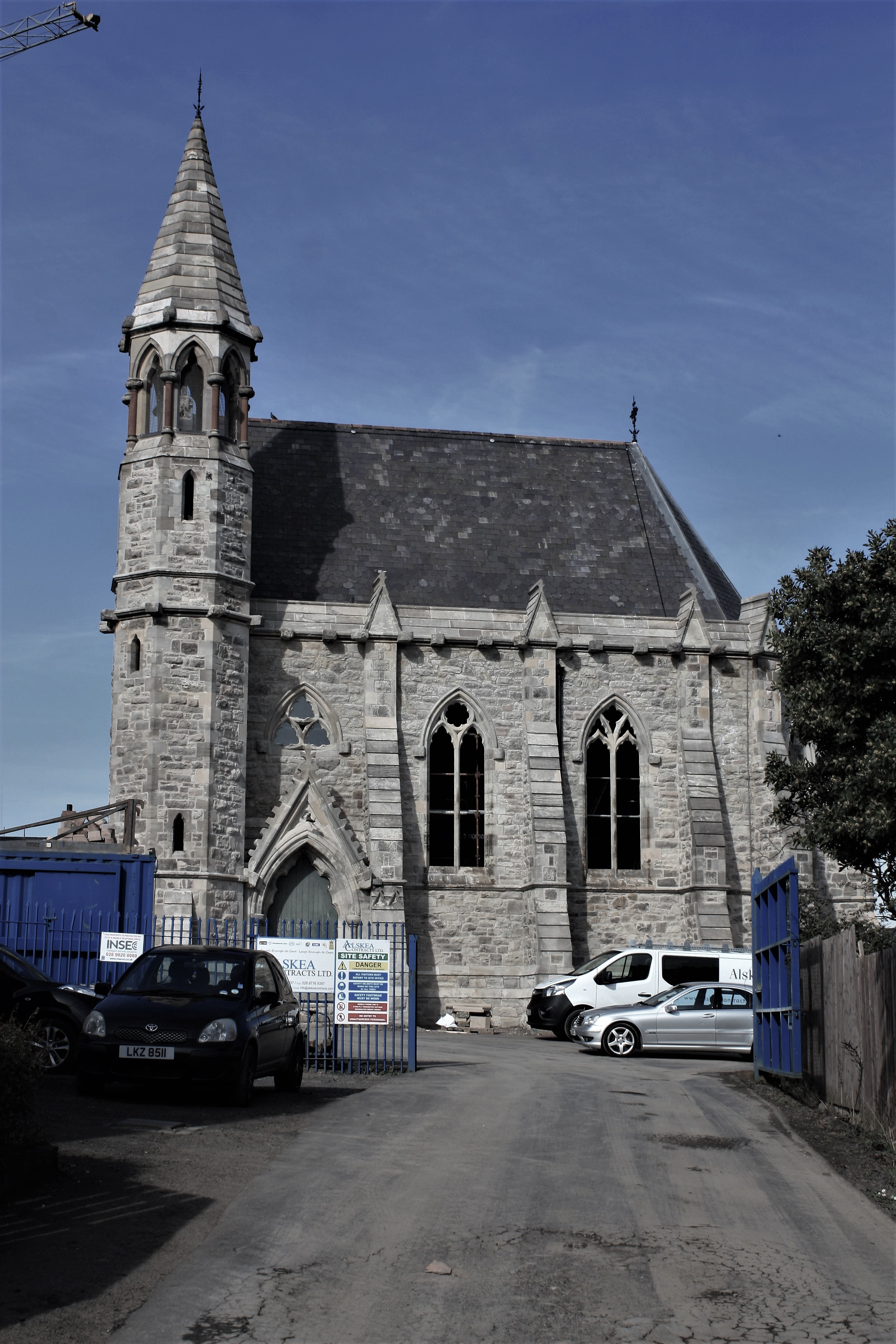
Photograph of the former Chapel of the Resurrection during its conversion into flats. Photograph was taken from the direction of Innisfayle Park, c. 2018.

The Chapel of the Resurrection was also built for The 3rd Marquess of Donegall in the late 1860s, at the same time as the new Belfast Castle. The chapel was built in the Decorated Gothic version of the Gothic Revival style and was constructed in the demesne of the new castle, just off the Antrim Road. This Church of Ireland chapel was originally designed and built as a mortuary chapel and new mausoleum for the Donegall family, specifically being built as a memorial to Frederick Richard, Earl of Belfast (1827–1853), the son and heir apparent of The 3rd Marquess of Donegall. Lord Belfast had died in Naples, aged 25, from scarlatina in February 1853. It seems that this small chapel was converted in 1891 into being a family chapel for regular worship, while also remaining as a family mausoleum.

As with Belfast Castle itself, there is some debate over who actually designed the Chapel of the Resurrection. The designs for the chapel came out of the office of Lanyon, Lynn and Lanyon. Some architectural historians believe that the chapel, like the castle, was designed by either W.H. Lynn or John Lanyon.

Harriet, Countess of Shaftesbury (1836–1898), the wife of The 8th Earl of Shaftesbury, later commissioned a sculpture to commemorate her brother, Lord Belfast, and her mother, Harriet, Marchioness of Donegall (1822–1860), the daughter of The 1st Earl of Glengall and the first wife of The 3rd Marquess of Donegall. The sculpture, which was originally located in the Chapel of the Resurrection, was carved in white marble, and it depicts the young Lord Belfast lying on a sofa, dying from scarlatina, being mourned by his lace-capped mother, Lady Donegall. The sculpture was carved by Patrick McDowell, R.A., the well-known Belfast artist. Following the closure of the chapel in 1972, the sculpture was moved to the foyer of Belfast City Hall, where it remains in situ.

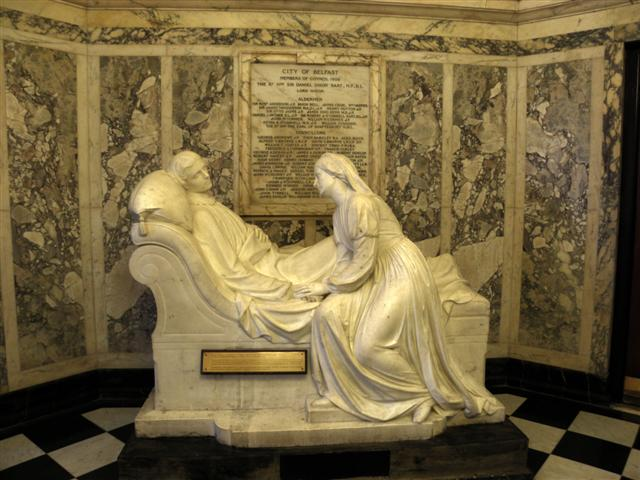
Sculpture in the foyer of Belfast City Hall depicting Frederick Richard, Earl of Belfast, dying, while his mother Harriet, Marchioness of Donegall, watches. The sculpture was originally located inside the Chapel of the Resurrection on the Belfast Castle Demesne.

The Chapel of the Resurrection, like Belfast Castle and the rest of its surrounding demesne, was inherited by the Shaftesbury family in October 1883. The chapel ceased to be privately owned in 1938, when The 9th Earl of Shaftesbury handed the chapel over to the Church of Ireland Diocese of Down, Connor and Dromore, after which the building was used for public worship. In January 1945, the Church of Ireland Diocese of Connor replaced the Diocese of Down, Connor and Dromore in this part of Belfast.

In the aftermath of the Second World War, the chapel and the lands surrounding it were detached from the Belfast Castle Demesne. These lands were redeveloped as housing estates, mainly in the 1950s and 1960s, leaving the chapel marooned in the middle of these new estates. The last service in the chapel was held in 1972, after which the building was closed. Following its closure, the chapel suffered extensive vandalism throughout the 1970s, 1980s, 1990s and first two decades of the twenty-first-century, with all of the glass in the building's windows either being removed or destroyed. The graves of the deceased in the chapel were also desecrated by vandals during these years.

Having been derelict for almost fifty years, the chapel was eventually converted into luxury flats, with work being completed in 2020. Now called The Chapel, the building is part of a new housing development called Donegall Park Gardens, just off Innisfayle Park.

== Main Gate Lodge ==
The Gate Lodge at what was formerly the main entrance into the Belfast Castle Demesne still stands. Designed by John Lanyon, the son and business partner of Sir Charles Lanyon, the Gate Lodge is located on the Antrim Road. It has been described by the architectural historian Dixie Dean as a "High Victorian Picturesque essay". The lodge was principally designed and built in the Scots Baronial style, just like Belfast Castle itself, and was constructed for The 3rd Marquess of Donegall in the late 1860s, at the same time as both the castle and the Chapel of the Resurrection.

The lodge was built in uncoursed squared quarry-faced sandstone, honey coloured with pink ashlar dressings. The grand, octagonal stone carriageway piers that once stood to one side of the Gate Lodge were demolished in the mid-twentieth century, as was the attached wall surrounding the demesne. The Gate Lodge is now occupied by a dental practice, and is located where Strathmore Park meets the Antrim Road. Like the former Chapel of the Resurrection, the Gate Lodge is now surrounded by modern housing and is no longer part of the present-day Belfast Castle Demesne.

== Location ==
Belfast Castle is located 400 feet (121.92 metres) above sea level on Cave Hill, overlooking Belfast in County Antrim in the east of Ulster.

== Facilities ==
Belfast Castle is open to the public daily with a visitor centre, antique shop, Millennium Herb Garden, restaurant, and a playground. Visitors can see a bedroom, set up in the style of the 1920s, so visitors can see a "snapshot in time" of what the castle looked like at the end of its life as a private residence. The Cavehill Visitor Centre is located inside the castle.

While it is open to the public daily, reservations can be made for a private room to host weddings, business meetings, and parties.

== Structure ==
Since the construction of the current Belfast Castle in the late 1860s, its sandstone walls and towers have been restored. The castle was designed and built in the Victorian version of the Scots Baronial style, which was an architectural style that originally developed out of French-inspired Gothic styles during the Renaissance in Scotland in the sixteenth century. Scots Baronial style castles were typically built on asymmetrical plans and included high roofs, towers, and turrets to display the owner's status. The new Belfast Castle was constructed in the late 1860s using pink Scrabo sandstone from near Newtownards in the north of County Down, along with Giffnock sandstone dressings from Renfrewshire and a rock-faced basalt plinth.

One of the castle's most iconic features is the winding stone staircase on the garden façade, whose greyish-brown colour stands out against the burnt sienna sandstone and brick red detail. This serpentine outdoor staircase was installed for The 9th Earl of Shaftesbury in 1894.

As in the twentieth-century, many of the rooms have been turned into public tea rooms or are available to be reserved for private functions.

== Restoration ==
Belfast Castle was closed in 1978 for a restoration and refurbishing effort. The architecture partnership of Hewitt and Haslam oversaw and carried out the over £2 million project, with the castle and demesne reopening on Armistice Day, 11 November 1988. Since then, it has once again become a popular spot for weddings and other celebrations as well as for business meetings.

Another example of events held at the castle was the 2015 Belfast Castle Hospice Walk, held by the Northern Ireland Hospice to benefit local charities and those living with terminal illnesses.

The castle underwent another round of refurbishment in May 2003.
