= Cliftonville Golf Club =

Golf club in Belfast, Northern Ireland

Coordinates: 54.625°N 5.953°W

Cliftonville Golf Club is located on Westland Road in north Belfast. It consists of a 9-hole course with an eighteen-hole par of 70.

The club was founded in 1911. The course lies underneath the shadow of Cavehill. The first hole has been nominated twice in BBC NI's toughest Par 3.
