= Castle High School, Belfast =

Former secondary school in Belfast, North Ireland

Coordinates: 54.629°N 5.931°W

Castle High School was a state-controlled co-educational secondary school for pupils aged 11 to 16 in Belfast, Northern Ireland. It was located in Fortwilliam Park, and was within the Belfast Education and Library Board area.

== History ==
The school was opened on 1 September 1985, when Dunlambert Boys’ Secondary School amalgamated with Graymount Girls’ Secondary School and Mountcollyer Secondary School.

The new school was established on the Fortwilliam Park site of the former Dunlambert School, which was founded in 1958, and, at its peak, accommodated 1,000 pupils.

Castle High School was the beneficiary of a remarkably historic site: within the school's 8-acre (32,000 m^{2}) grounds are the Celtic and Anglo-Norman remains of an original Dun, or fort, flanked by a prehistoric souterrain.

=== 50th anniversary ===
On 23 June 2008, Castle High School held a celebration to mark 50 years of education at its current site at Fortwilliam Park in north Belfast. The event was hosted by the BBC journalist and broadcaster Dr William Crawley, a former pupil of Dunlambert School, with musical performances from the Belfast School of Music's Concert Band.

== Closure ==
Castle High School closed on 31 August 2009. From 1 September 2009 the building was used by the Belfast School of Music and is the site of offices for the Education Authority.

In 2021, plans were announced to turn Castle High School into a special school.
