= Cavehill =

Hill overlooking the city of Belfast in Northern Ireland

Cave Hill
- Binn Uamha
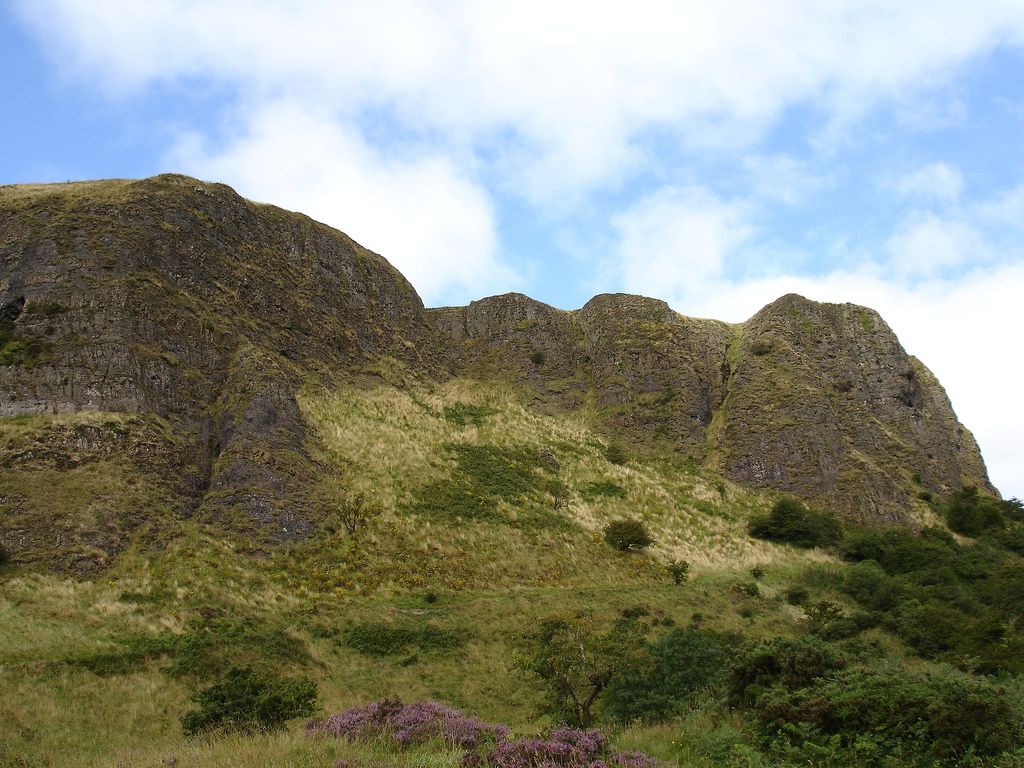

Highest point
- Elevation: 368 m (1,207 ft)
- Coordinates: 54.647°N 5.951°W

Geography
- Location: near Belfast, County Antrim, Northern Ireland

Climbing
- Easiest route: Hike

Cave Hill — or Cavehill — is a rocky hill overlooking the city of Belfast, Northern Ireland, with a height of 368 metres (1,207 ft). It is marked by basalt cliffs and caves, and its distinguishing feature is 'Napoleon's Nose', a tall cliff fancifully said to resemble the profile of the famous emperor of that name. At its highest point are the remains of an ancient promontory fort called McArt's Fort. Cavehill was also historically called 'Ben Madigan' (from Irish: Beann Mhadagáin, "Madagán’s peak"), after a king of Ulster called Madagán.

Cave Hill, which is within Cave Hill Country Park, forms part of the Belfast Hills and marks the southeastern edge of the Antrim Plateau. All of Belfast can be seen from its peak, as can the Isle of Man and Scotland on clear days. Like Arthur's Seat in Edinburgh, it lies just a few miles from the centre of a major city.

Cave Hill is thought to be the inspiration for Jonathan Swift's Gulliver's Travels. Swift imagined that Cave Hill resembled the shape of a sleeping giant safeguarding the city.

== Overview ==
Cave Hill rises to 368 metres (1,207 ft) above sea level. Most of its lower east side lies on the Belfast Castle estate, which has as its focal point the imposing 19th-century Scottish baronial castle. The castle was designed by the firm of Lanyon, Lynn and Lanyon and was constructed for The 3rd Marquess of Donegall in the late 1860s and early 1870s in the Deer Park. The slopes of Cave Hill were originally used as farmland but, from the 1880s, a major planting exercise was undertaken, producing the now familiar deciduous and coniferous woodland landscape. Belfast Castle estate was given to the City of Belfast by The 9th Earl of Shaftesbury in 1934.

=== Caves ===
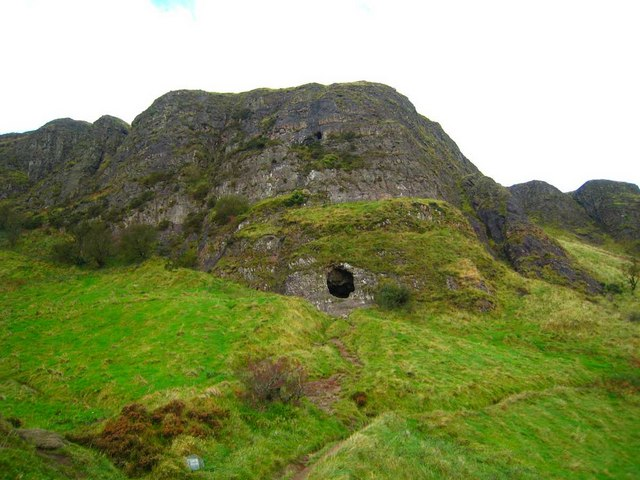
One of the caves

There are three large caves. The lowest is 21 feet (6.4 m) long, 18 feet (5.5 m) wide and varies from 7 to 10 feet (3.0 m) in height. Above this is another cave; 10 feet (3.0 m) long, 7 feet (2.1 m) wide and 6 feet (1.8 m) in height. Above this is the third major cave, said to be divided into 2 unequal parts, each of which is more extensive than the larger of the other caves, but the ascent is notoriously dangerous and thus few venture to it. The caves are man-made, and it is postulated that they were originally excavated for iron-mining.

Adjacent to the lowest cave is 'The Devil's Punchbowl', also sometimes called 'The Devil's Cauldron', a site where ancient Celtic farmers corralled their cattle. This consists mainly of a steep hill, mainly of rocks and boulders, and is considered dangerous to amateurs.

=== McArt's Fort ===
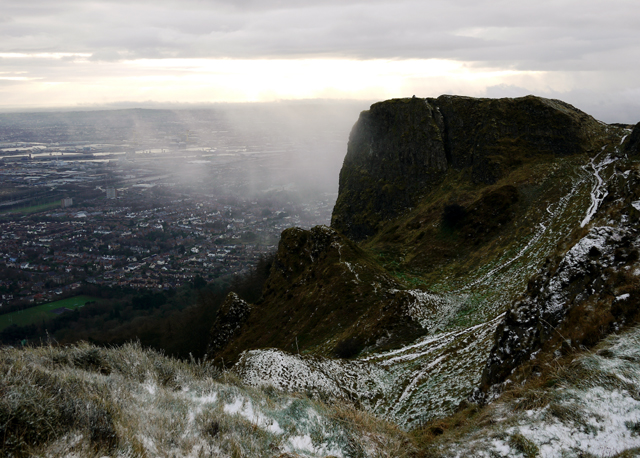
McArt's Fort

This fort, on the top of the cliff, is an example of an old ringfort or rath. It is protected on one side by a precipice. On the others by a single ditch with a depth of 10 feet (3.0 m) and width of 25 feet (7.6 m). The enclosed area is nearly level. The flat top of the fort is 150 feet (46 m) from north to south, and 180 feet (55 m) from east to west.

It is believed that the fort's inhabitants used the caves to store food for the winter and may have served as a refuge during times of attack. Due to its imposing profile, the site of the fort is nicknamed 'Napoleon's Nose' by locals. More to the point if you look up to Cave Hill from many parts of Belfast you would see its profile that resembles Napoleon Bonaparte's nose from the side.

== History ==
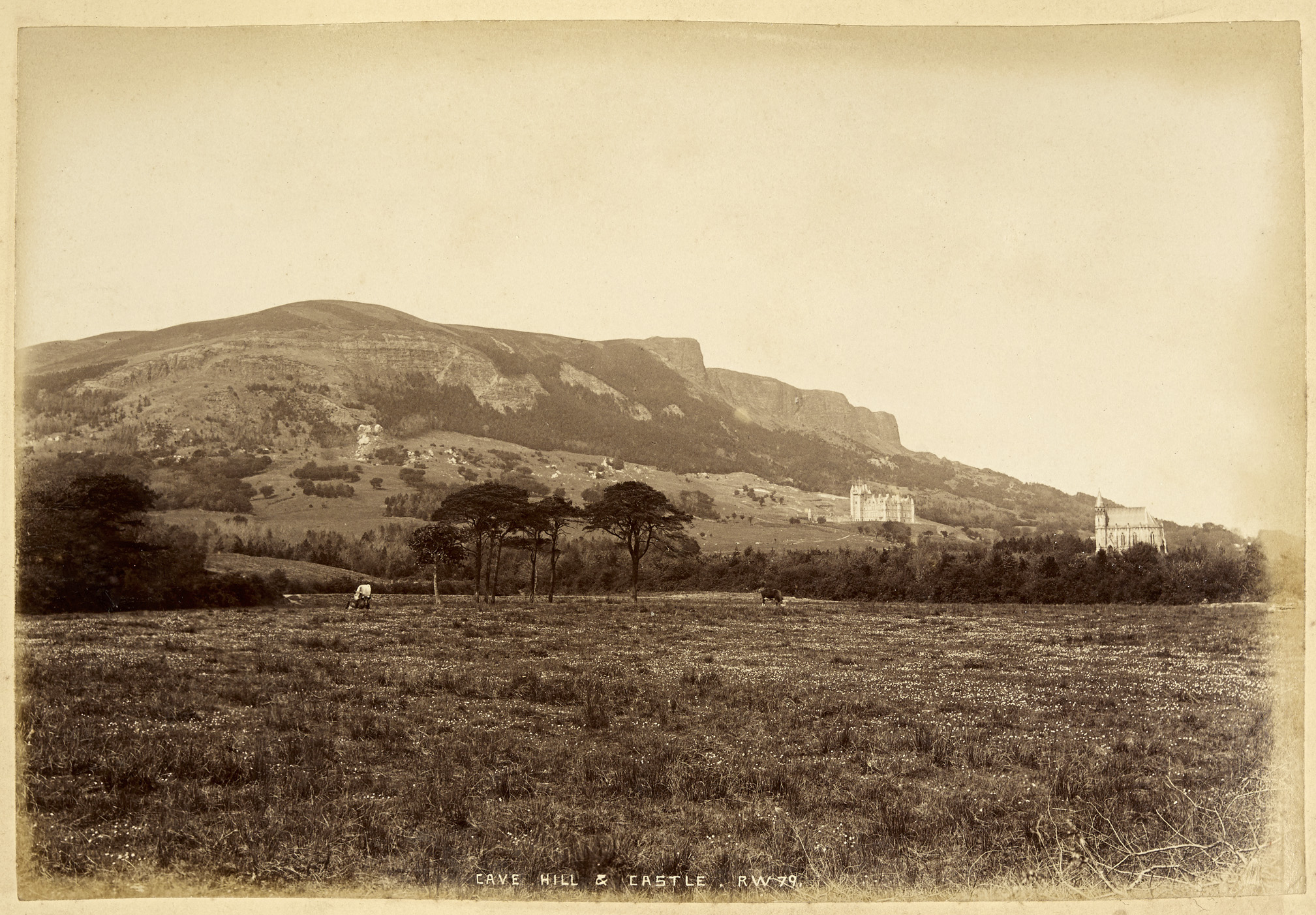
Cave Hill in the late 19th century

The name 'Cave Hill' appears to be a translation of the Irish Binn Uamha. The hill was originally known in Irish as Beann Mhadagáin (meaning "Madagán's peak"), after a king of Ulaid (Ulster), Matudán mac Muiredaig, who died in 856 AD. It could also be named after a later king, Matudán mac Áeda (reigned 937–950). The later king's grandson, Eochaid mac Ardgail, was killed at the battle of Crew Hill in 1004, in which the men of Ulster were defeated by their old enemies, the Cenél nEógain. It is from him that McArt's Fort derived its name.

The residential neighbourhood at the foot of Cave Hill's entrance is derivatively known as Ben Madigan, with street names to match, and is a wealthy semi-outer city, semi-suburban area. The name 'Ben Madigan' can also be found attached to buildings and schools close to the area, e.g. the Belfast Royal Academy has the Ben Madigan Preparatory School on the Antrim Road.

United Irishmen Theobald Wolfe Tone and Henry Joy McCracken allegedly met at Cave Hill in 1795 to take an oath to launch the rebellion of 1798. McCracken was captured on Cave Hill in 1798.

The crowning stone Giant's Chair of the O'Neill clan was apparently sited on Cave Hill summit until 1896 and gave its name to the nearby Throne Hospital.

During World War II, a bomb dropped prematurely during a German bombing raid on Belfast exploded, causing a large crater near the grounds of Belfast Castle. It is understood that RAF Bomber Command was situated on Cave Hill in the early years of World War II before relocating to Castle Archdale in County Fermanagh. Hence the German bomb may have been intentional.

On 1 June 1944, an American Air Force B-17 bomber crashed into Cave Hill during heavy fog, killing all ten crew instantly. The incident inspired Richard Attenborough's final film, Closing the Ring (2007). Some scenes of the film were shot on Cave Hill. The site of the crash is accessed via Carr's Glen Country Park where the field, known locally as 'The Bomb hole Field' remains open to public.

== Geology ==
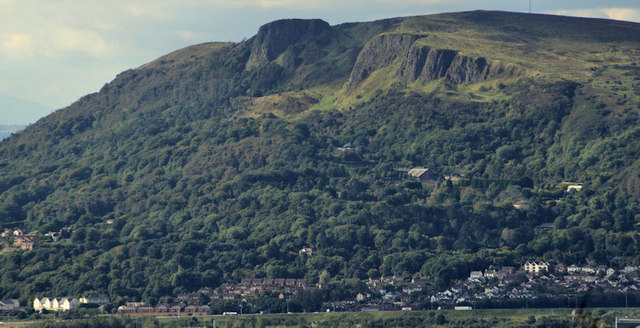
Cave Hill from the east

The hill owes its characteristic shape to Paleocene basalt lava flows, from 65 million years ago. This is underlain by Cretaceous—145 million years—Ulster White Limestone and below this is Jurassic—200 million years—Waterloo Mudstone Formation, more commonly known as Lias clay.

Limestone was mined on the southern flanks of Cave Hill in Victorian times and transported to Belfast docks by way of a horse-worked railway along the Limestone Road. The railroad was abandoned in the 1890s. Two small hamlets—Daddystown and Mammystown—were built on either side of the railway track in the early 1820s as dwellings for quarry workers. Some of the local avenues and streets bear the name 'Waterloo', in reference to their geological origins.

== Tourism and recreation ==
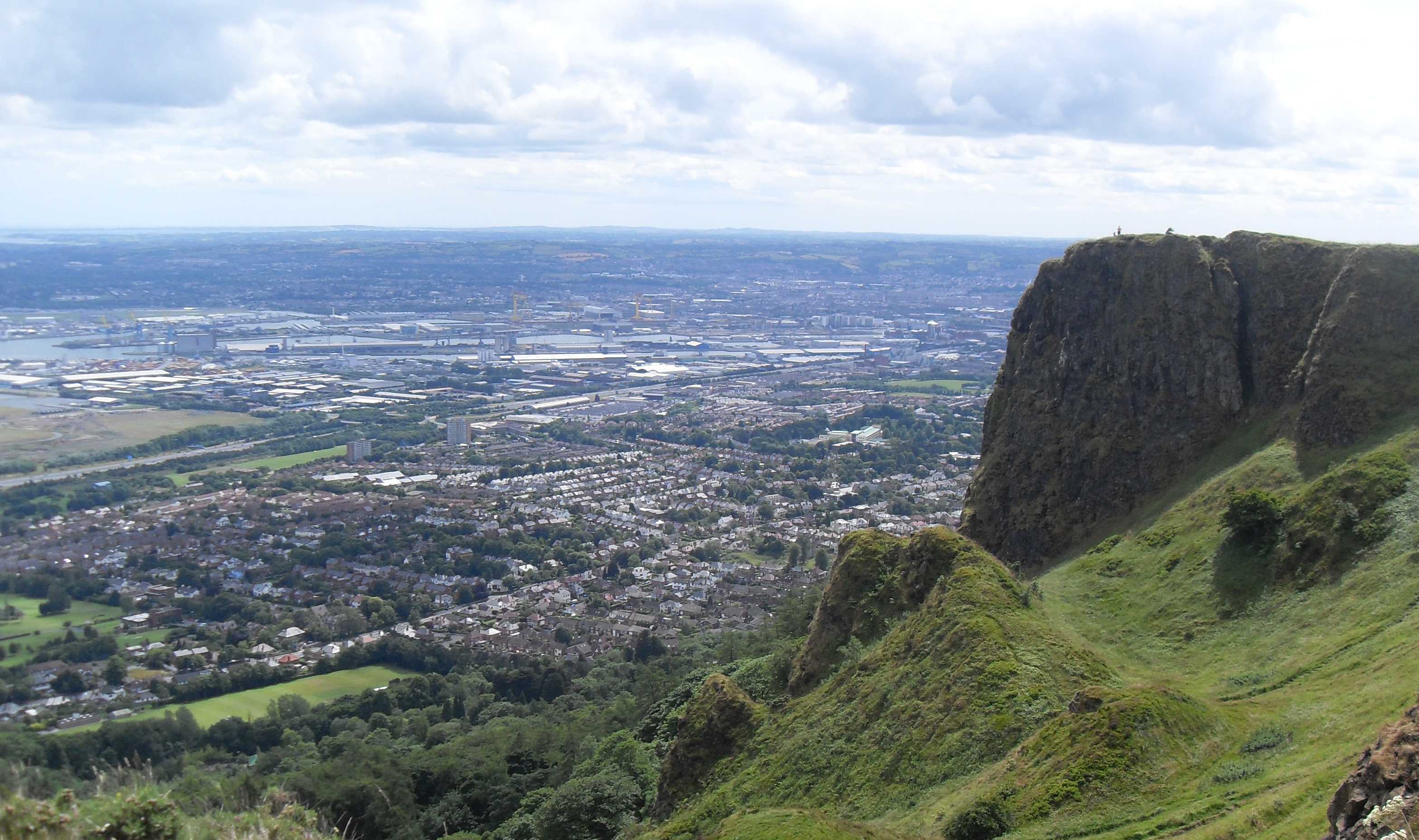
People on McArt's Fort overlooking Belfast

Cave Hill Country Park, Belfast Zoo and Belfast Castle are visited by both locals and tourists. In the 18th century, the people of Belfast visited the area on Easter Monday for the Cave Hill fete, near a spring known as the 'Volunteers' Well'. The summit has views southwards over Belfast City and Lough towards the Mourne Mountains, Scrabo Tower and Slieve Croob.
