= Enterprise of Ulster =

The Enterprise of Ulster was a programme launched in the 1570s where Queen Elizabeth I tried to get English entrepreneurs settled in areas of Ireland troubled by the activities of Ulster. Under this programme Nicholas Malby, Thomas Chatterton and Sir Thomas Smith were granted large areas of Eastern Ulster and a larger area in Clandeboye, a grant of all of County Antrim except for the Route and the Glens, was granted to the Earl of Essex in 1571. It is believed that Malby never followed up regarding his grant, though he did serve in the military. This was an attempt by the crown to counter resistance in Ulster. This programme was, by all accounts, unsuccessful.

== Background ==
For some time after the enterprise was established, the crown did not actively interfere in the affairs of the other Provinces of Ireland.

== See also ==
- Plantation of Ulster
