= Tír Eoghain =

Gaelic kingdom of ancient and Medieval Ireland

Tír Eoghain Tyrone or Tír Eoghain (Irish)
- 5th century–1607
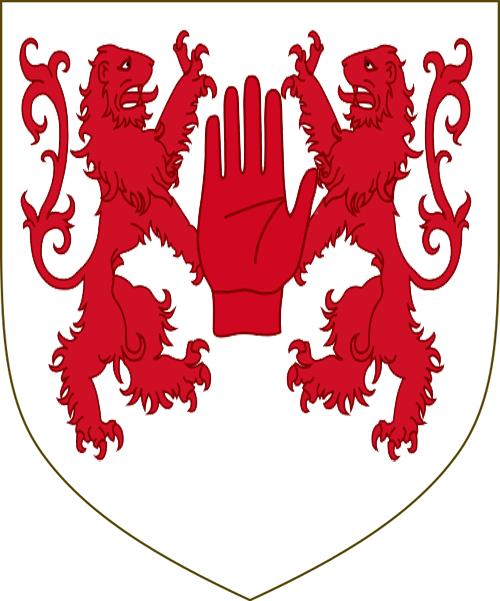
- Coat of arms

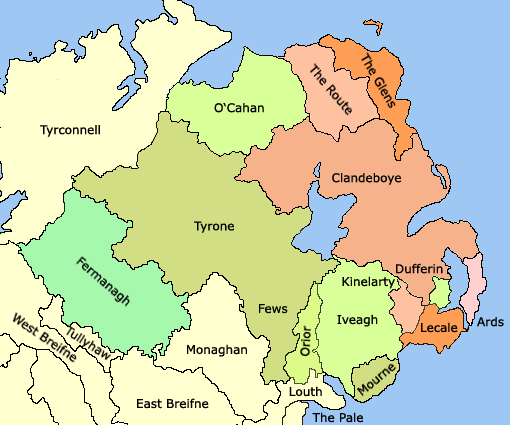
- Tyrone in the early 16th century
- Status: Túatha of Ailech (until 1185)
- Capital: Dungannon; Tullyhogue Fort
- Common languages: Irish
- Religion: Catholic Church
- Government: Elective monarchy
- King / Chief
  - c. 465: Eógan mac Néill (first)
  - 1593-1607: Aodh Mór Ó Néill (last)
- History
  - Established: 5th century
  - Disestablished: 1607
Preceded by	Succeeded by
Ailech	Clandeboye; Kingdom of Ireland
- Today part of: United Kingdom of Great Britain and Northern Ireland

Tír Eoghain (meaning 'Land of Eoghan' in Irish), also known as Tyrone, was a kingdom and later earldom of Gaelic Ireland, comprising parts of present-day County Tyrone, County Armagh, County Londonderry and County Donegal (Raphoe). The kingdom represented the core homeland of the Cenél nEógain people of the Northern Uí Néill and although they ruled, there were smaller groups of other Gaels in the area. One part of the realm to the north-east broke away and expanded, becoming Clandeboye, ruled by a scion branch of the O'Neill dynasty. In one form or another, Tyrone existed for over a millennium. Its main capital was Dungannon, though kings were inaugurated at Tullyhogue Fort.

Upon its foundation in the 5th century, Tyrone was a sub-kingdom of the larger Aileach, which represented the powerbase of the Uí Néill (descendants of Niall of the Nine Hostages) in the north of Ireland. The territory of Eoghan mac Néill was initially based in Inishowen and expanded out from there under his descendants. Periodically, during the time of Aileach, the leaders of Tyrone established themselves as High Kings of Ireland, providing in total of thirteen High Kings from the 6th to the 10th centuries. The first was Muirchertach mac Muiredaig and the last from this period was Domnall ua Néill. Three later Tyrone claimants to the High Kingship were Domnall Ua Lochlainn and Muirchertach Mac Lochlainn in 12th century and finally Brian Chatha an Dúna O'Neill in the 13th century.

In the 13th century, Aileach split up into its two most powerful kindred components: Tyrone (under the O'Neill dynasty) and Tyrconnell (under the O'Donnell dynasty). Between themselves and the Lordship of Ireland, they competed in the north for hegemony over the Ulster region, but their influence frequently went far beyond the regional. In the 14th century, pushing eastwards, Tyrone benefited from the Gaelic reasurgence and was able to establish Clandeboye. Sometimes a sub-kingdom of Tyrone, it soon asserted its own authority and became a prominent player in its own right. With the creation of the Crown of England's Kingdom of Ireland in the 16th century, Tyrone would be brought into the Tudors' sphere of influence, but was a major source of Gaelic Irish resistance, before, while and after being subordinated. From the rebellion of Shane the Proud to the Nine Years' War under Hugh O'Neill and later, Tyrone leaders were involved in the subsequent Irish Rebellion of 1641 and Irish Confederate Wars (particularly Owen Roe O'Neill).

== History ==
=== Ailech ===
From the 5th century founding of Cenél nEógain, the tuatha was a sub-unit of the larger kingdom of Ailech (which they typically held the kingship to), along with their Cenél Conaill cousins, fellow descendants of Niall of the Nine Hostages. The initial ascent of Ailech had coincided with the decline of the Ulaid, whose kingdom of Ulster receded to the north-east coast.

In the 12th century the kingdom of Ailech split into two sovereign territories and Cenél nEógain became Tír Eoghain, the land of Eoghan, Anglicised as Tyrone. It was ruled under the Meic Lochlainn clan and then under their kinsmen the Ó Néill clan. The other part of Ailech, Cenél Conaill became known as Tír Conaill, the land of Conall, Anglicised as Tyrconnell.

=== Kingdom of Tyrone ===
Following the Norman invasion of Ulster in 1177, Tír Eoghain had become the predominant power in the north of Ireland, a position it regained upon the collapse of the Norman Earldom of Ulster in the 14th century.

=== 16th century: ambitions and internal rivalries ===
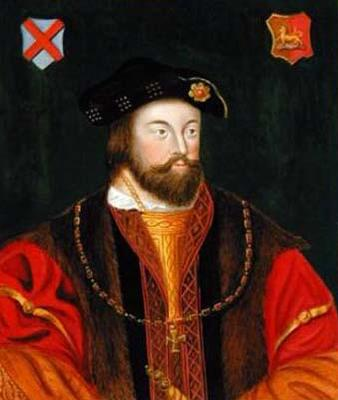
Silken Thomas was the cousin of King of Tyrone, Conn Bacagh O'Neill. His rebellion had a massive effect on all of Ireland (including Tyrone).

With the ascent of Henry VIII to the English throne, the politics of the Tudor monarch's Lordship of Ireland would come to have a dramatic effect on all of Ireland, including the Kingdom of Tyrone. One of the premier Old English (Norman) forces in Ireland, since the Middle Ages, had been the FitzGerald dynasty. During the Wars of the Roses, they had been loyal to the House of York, despite the eventual victory of the House of Lancaster (including the Tudors), who were supported by their rivals from the Butler dynasty. Despite having backing the losing side in the War, the FitzGeralds remained influential in Ireland and difficult to unseat. The King of Tyrone, Conn Bacagh O'Neill, in a personal capacity, carried the sword of state before his uncle Gerald Og FitzGerald, Earl of Kildare when he was made Lord Deputy of Ireland in 1524. The Earl of Kildare had been called to England by the King in 1534 and when he arrived was put in the Tower of London. Before he had left, Gerald had placed his 21-year-old son Silken Thomas FitzGerald in charge of the Lordship of Ireland in his absence. The FitzGeralds had many enemies in Dublin, not least the Butlers and false rumours were spread that Gerald had been beheaded in the Tower. This rumour reached the ear of the young and inexperienced Silken Thomas, who, in reaction, rode through the streets on horseback with his men to St. Mary's Abbey, Dublin, where he cast off sword and robes of state and renounced his allegiance to the English monarchy (his father in London, upon hearing of his young son's rebellion, did in fact die a few days later "of grief").

Silken Thomas rose up in Rebellion and was determined to take Dublin and "avenge" the death of his father: he rallied to his banner a sizeable proportion of Gaelic Ireland, or at least some of the most influential parts of it, this included; the O'Neills of Tyrone (his cousin) and the O'Briens of Thomond, as well as the O'Carrolls of Éile, O'Connor Falys of Offaly and the O'Mores of Laois who backed him up for the attacks on the English Pale. The English Archbishop of Dublin, John Alen, died during the Siege of Dublin in controversial circumstances. As the tide began to turn against them, Thomas surrendered to Leonard Grey at Maynooth and was given safe passage to ask for mercy from the King in London but was executed at Tyburn with his uncles in 1537. This issue was not concluded though, as back in Ireland the Geraldine League was founded in 1539 by the O'Neills of Tyrone, the O'Donnells of Tyrconnell, the O'Briens of Thomond and other clans, to support the claim of the 14-year-old, Gerald FitzGerald to the now forfeited title of the Earldom of Kildare. The boy was then living under the guardianship of his aunt, Eleanor McCarthy, Queen of Tyrconnell. This Gaelic alliance under the auspicies of the Geraldine League was able to menace the English Pale, looting and sacking Ardee and Navan, before Conn Bacagh O'Neill and Manus O'Donnell were dealt a thorough defeat at the Battle of Belahoe by Grey and Gerald Aylmer in 1539.

Tyrone was invaded in 1541 by an army under Anthony St Leger, which saw the final defeat of the Geraldine League and the young titular Earl of Kildare fled to Catholic Europe, becoming a Knights Hospitaller. The King of Tyrone's eldest son Phelim Caoch O'Neill was taken hostage and died the following year. While the FitzGeralds had not been treated with magnanimity, Henry VIII as part of his plan to construct a Kingdom of Ireland adopted a policy of surrender and regrant, whereby, the Gaelic kings who held sway on the ground beyond the bounds of the old Lordship of Ireland could surrender their sovereignty, but be awarded a title in the Peerage of Ireland and keep their lands, so long as they swore allegiance to the King, adopted English law and became members of the new Anglican Church that Henry was creating. This offer was opened up to Conn Bacagh O'Neill through St Leger, who accepted and went to London in 1542, pledging allegiance to Henry VIII: he was rewarded handsomely in terms of money and land and was also made Earl of Tyrone. The heir to the Earldom would be given the title Baron Dungannon and with the favourite son Phelim Caoch O'Neill dead (he was killed by the MacDonnells of Antrim), Conn made sure to have the patent made out to Feardorcha (Matthew) O'Neill, an illegitimate son. This choice skipped over the legitimate Tanist of Tyrone, Shane O'Neill, who was raised by his foster-family the O'Donnelly clan.

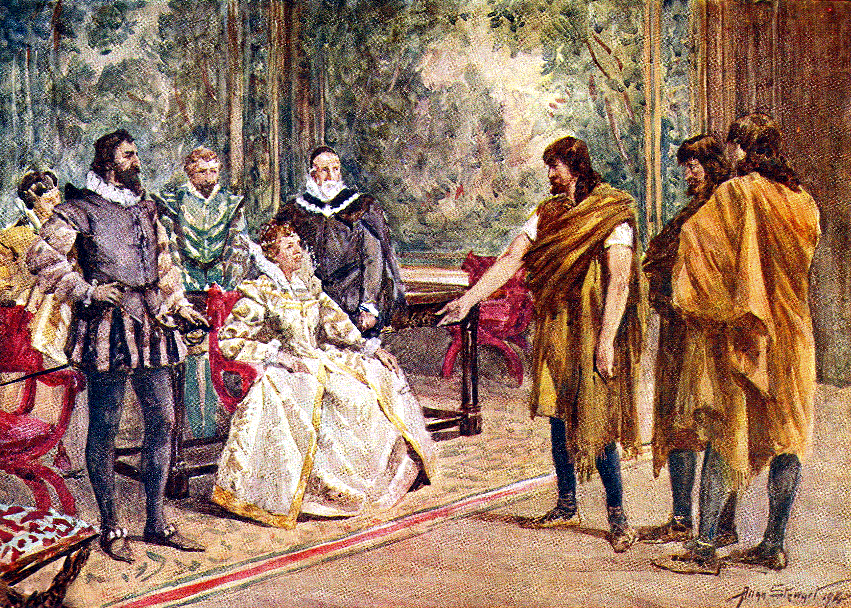
Shane O'Neill meeting with Elizabeth I. He was cut out of the succession to Tyrone and subsequently pushed his claim. This marked a cultural clash between Gaelic tanistry and newly imported English law.

When Shane O'Neill was 28-years-old, his foster-family the O'Donnellys, ambushed and killed Feardorcha (Matthew) whom they had always maintained was not an actual O'Neill, initiating a bloody conflict within the family. This was excellerated by the death of Conn Bacagh O'Neill the following year in 1559. A legal challenge was launched by Shane O'Neill against Feardorcha's son Brian O'Neill over the rights to the Earldom of Tyrone. By this time, Elizabeth I had come to the throne of England and Ireland: she was keen to come to an agreement with Shane O'Neill, if he would submit to her authority and the Lord Deputy. However, Shane greatly distrusted the Lord Deputy, who at the time was Thomas Radclyffe, the Earl of Sussex. So the authorities instead backed Brian O'Neill. Sussex tried to encircle Shane O'Neill by inciting Tyrconnell against him, but Shane's men were able to capture Calvagh O'Donnell. (Note: The English had secretly arranged for various planned assaults on Tyrone with the goal of smashing Shane O'Neill. Sussex and the Earl of Kildare were to attack from the south, the O'Donnell were to be incited from the north-west and the MacDonnell of Antrim (Scots) from the north-east. The capture of the King of Tyrconnell pulled the rug from under that. Calvagh O'Donnell was treated exceptionally harshly: Shane took his wife as a concubine and had several children with her, while Calvagh was tortured and kept in a steel cage in front of Dungannon Castle for three years.) Deep inside Gaelic country, Sussex was garrisoning Armagh Cathedral (which had been founded as a monastery by St. Patrick but had recently been declared Anglican under the Tudors), before Shane O'Neill's men engaged the English at the Battle of the Red Sagums in July 1561, destroying much of Sussex's army. Shane had himself inaugurated as The Ó Néill at Tullyhogue Fort which further engraged Sussex, who accused him of treason. The increasingly desperate Sussex attempted to assassinate Shane by poisoning his wine. This having failed, Elizabeth I intervened directly and agreed to treat with the "rebel" chief in London, with the Earl of Kildare and Earl of Ormond escorting him to ensure his personal safety.

Shane returned from the cordial meeting with Tyrone's position strengthened. While the details of the Earldom were to be worked out, Elizabeth I had allowed to call himself The Ó Néill and for Tyrone to collect taxes from uirrithe, which had been abrogated since the days of her father. This left Shane as the hegemon of Ulster with Magennis of Iveagh, O'Hanlon of Orior, Maguire of Fermanagh and others forced to subordinate themselves. While Shane had been in London, the Tanist of Tyrone, Turlough Luineach O’Neill had killed off Brian O'Neill, Shane's rival. Boosted by his new found royal favour, Shane's Tyrone moved against the MacDonnells of Antrim at the Battle of Glentaisie in 1565, claiming to be hammering Her Majesty's Scottish enemies (all the while building power for himself). Far from please the English, this powerful Gaelic prince struck fear into the English administration in Ireland: Sir Henry Sidney, Tudor arch-colonialist, sought to succeed in suppressing Tyrone where Sussex had failed. The Dublin-based Irish Parliament moved to strip Shane of right to the title The Ó Néill and gave the Crown legal title to Ulster. Writing as "Defender of the Faith", O'Neill now tried to invoke Catholic solidarity in reaching out to Catholic powers to help him force the English from Ireland, including: Charles IX of France, Charles, Cardinal of Lorraine and Mary, Queen of Scots. This had the effect of making him be branded a "traitor" by the English government and subsequently, he raided the English Pale. However, retribution was wrought on Tyrone by Sidney around the same time.

Shane's rebellion came to an end with his assassination in the aftermath of the Battle of Farsetmore in May 1567. Tyrone had failed to get the ascent of Tyrconnell's new chief Sir Hugh O'Donnell to join with them against the English and recognise Shane as King of Ulster (in fact Tyrconnell were raiding Tyrone territories at Strabane). During the battle, the forces of Tyrone were surprised and defeated by Tyrconnell, with many deaths. Shane O'Neill, out of options, threw himself on the mercy of a warband from Clan MacDonald of Dunnyveg at Cushendun. Unbeknownst to him, William Piers, commander of the English garrison at Carrickfergus, had already cut a deal with the Scots Gallowglass and so they assassinated him (the English portrayed the incident as a drunken Gaelic brawl). Brian McPhelim O'Neill, Shane's distant cousin from the Clandeboye, is also believed to have provided intelligence to Piers. In the aftermath of these troubles, by the 1570s, the forces of Tudor England had moved towards a policy of explicit colonisation in Ulster with the "Enterprise of Ulster", moving against even loyal Gaelic lords (the Munster Plantations were also in genesis in the south). This effected Clandeboye more than Tyrone, as Tyrone was under the strong leadership of Turlough Luineach O’Neill as The Ó Néill. Showing military prowess in conflict with the Earl of Essex, the English granted him the right to retain a force of 300 Scots Gallowglass, confirmation of his lands in Tyrone and a title as Earl of Clanconnel. With events heating up in Munster, Turlough kept contacts open with Stewart Scotland and Habsburg Spain. In 1593, infirm and of old age, Turlough stood aside in Tyrone for Hugh O'Neill, Baron of Dungannon, a son of Matthew O'Neill (Turlough had killed Hugh's older brother Brian back in 1562). As a child, the English had taken Hugh O'Neill "into protection" and raised him in the English Pale just outside Dublin.

=== 17th century: flight and legacy conflicts ===
During the reign of Stuart monarch James I, Tyrone would be reduced further with the barony of Loughinsholin in its north-east being transferred to the new county of Londonderry. The Ó Néill rebelled several times, attempts to reassert sovereignty. The last attempt of substance was under Aodh Mór Ó Néill, Earl of Tyrone, who fled in 1607 in what became known as the Flight of the Earls, where he and many of his allies (particularly among Ulster Gaeldom) fled Ireland.

== Legacy ==
=== O'Neill heirs of Tyrone ===
The succession to the claim of being the O'Neill of Tyrone, depended on the position taken on the questioned legitimacy of Feardorcha (Matthew) O'Neill. His successor Hugh O'Neill, Earl of Tyrone had several sons, some of whom went into exile after he fled Ireland and others were murdered by the English authorities. Hugh's original heir was Hugh Oge O'Neill (1585–1609), Baron of Dungannon, but he pre-deceased his father. Two others were serving in the Spanish Army; Colonel Henry O'Neill and General John O'Neill. Another son, Bryan O'Neill, was strangled in his bedroom in Brussels by English spies. It was John O'Neill who was recognised as 3rd Earl of Tyrone (or Conde de Tyrone) by Pope Urban VIII and his sponsor Isabella Clara Eugenia in the Spanish Netherlands. John O'Neill died in 1641 and upon his death, he left his claims to his nine-year-old Spanish-born illegitimate son, Hugo Eugenio O'Neill (1633-1660), who only lived a couple of decades more without issue. Another illegitimate son was Patrick O'Neill (who, being illegitimate, did not claim the right to the Earldom of Tyrone). During the reign of James II of England, Patrick's son James O'Neill moved to Martinique under French dominion and his illegitimate descendants lived there for many following generations. They became culturally Frenchified. One female scion married a Baron von Bodman from the Grand Duchy of Baden.

== Population ==
The people who lived in Tyrone were Irish Gaels (mostly from the Northern Uí Néill but also others), with some Highland Scots mercenaries in later times. Although the territory was ruled by the O'Neills for most of its history, a variety of other Irish clans also lived in Tyrone, some with different hereditary roles. These are listed by Seán Mór Ó Dubhagáin in his works on pre-Norman 12th century Ireland. The second most senior clan, also from the Cenél nEógain kindred, were the Ó Catháin (O'Cahan), who ruled a sub-kingdom synonymous with the barony of Coleraine, then known as Fir na Craoibhe. This, along with Tirkeeran and Keenaght, formed "O'Cahan's Country." The O'Cahan held the hereditary honour of holding a shoe over the King of Tyrone's head during their royal inauguration rituals. The O'Cahans gained power in the 12th century to the detriment of the Ó Conchobhair (O'Connor) of the Ciannachta Glenn Geimin, an Eberian group distantly kindred to the Eóganachta in Munster, who remained in the area subsequently but in much reduced form.

== Kings of Tyrone ==
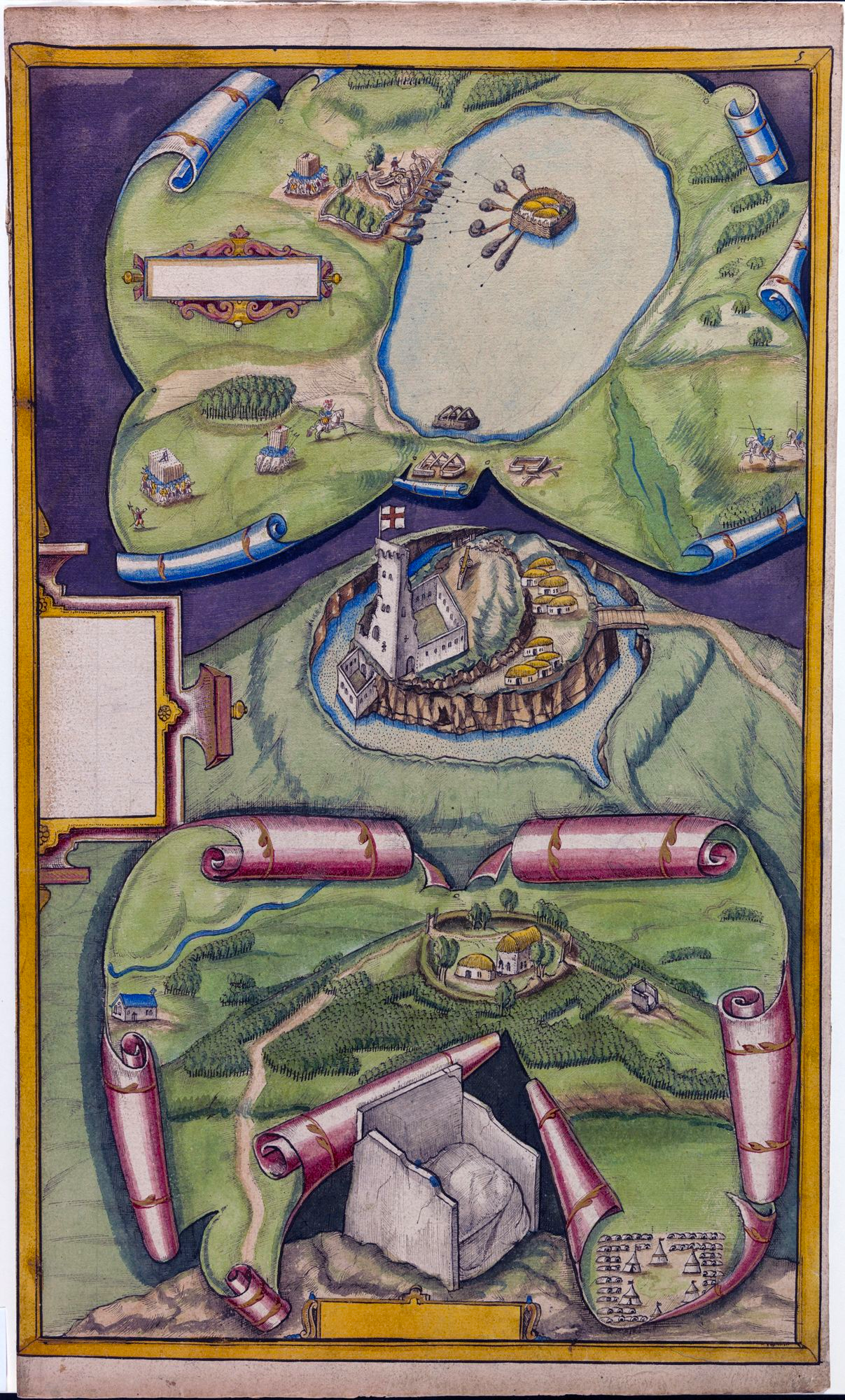
Detail of Richard Bartlett's 1602 map with an inuauguration chair located at Tullyhogue Fort. This is where the Kings of Tyrone ascended to their royal throne.

Below is a list of the O'Neill sovereign Kings of Tyrone. The Kings of Tyrone was inaugurated at Tullyhogue Fort with various other clans in the kingdom playing a special role. Tyrone itself was later divided between County Tyrone, County Armagh and County Coleraine (later County Londonderry) in the Kingdom of Ireland.

- Domhnall Mac Lochlainn (1185–1186 & 1187–1188)
- Ruaidhrí Ó Flaithbheartaigh (1186–1187)
- Muircheartach Mac Lochlainn (1188–1196)
- Aodh Méith Ó Néill (1196–1201 & 1201–1230)
- Conchobhar Beg Mac Lochlainn (1201)
- Niall Ruadh Ó Néill (1230)
- Domhnall Mac Lochlainn (1230–1232, 1235–1238 & 1239–1241)
- Domhnall Óg Ó Néill (1232–1235)
- Brian Chatha an Dúna O'Neill (1238–1239 & 1241–1260), also High King of Ireland
- Hugh Boy O'Neill (1260–1261 & 1263–1283)
- Niall Culanach O'Neill (1261–1263 & 1286–1290)
- Domhnall O'Neill (1283–1286, 1290–1291 & 1295–1325)
- Brian O'Neill (1291–1295), also King of Clandeboye
- Henry O'Neill (1325–1345), also King of Clandeboye
- Aodh Reamhair O'Neill (1345–1364)
- Niall Mór O'Neill (1364–1397), King of Ulster

- Niall Oge O'Neill (1397–1402)
- Brian Oge O'Neill (1402–1403)
- Domhnall O'Neill (1404–1410, 1414–1419 & 1421–1432)
- Eoghan O'Neill (1410–1414, 1419–1421 & 1432–1455)
- Éinri O'Neill (1455–1483)
- Conn O'Neill (1483–1493)
- Éinri Oge O'Neill (1493–1498)
- Domhnall Clarach O'Neill (1498–1509)
- Art O'Neill (1509–1513)
- Art Oge O'Neill (1513–1519)
- Conn Bacagh O'Neill (1519–1558), created Earl of Tyrone
- Shane O'Neill (1559–1567)
- Turlough Luineach O'Neill (1567–1593)
- Hugh O'Neill (1593–1607)

== See also ==
- Branches of the Cenél nEógain
