= List of rulers of Tyrone =

This article lists the rulers of Tyrone (Irish: Tír Eoghain) from 1185 to 1616. They are listed from their date of accession to date of death, unless otherwise stated.

Prior to this, the ruling dynasty – the Cenél nEógain – were most of the kings of Ailech. During the tenth and eleventh centuries, two main septs within the dynasty emerged; the Meic Lochlainn and the O'Neill. The latter family pushed aside the Meic Lochlainn, and from 1241 onwards the kingdom was ruled exclusively by members of the O'Neill family.

For the offshoot Clandeboye O'Neill kingdom, distinct from Tyrone, that was ruled by the descendants of Hugh Boy O'Neill, see List of rulers of Clandeboye.

== Kings of Tyrone, 1185—1607 ==
| Name | Portrait | Birth | Marriage(s) | Death |
|---|---|---|---|---|
| Domhnall mac Aodha Mac Lochlainn; 1185–1186; 1187–1188 | | Son of Aodh Mac Lochlainn | unknown | 1188 |
| Ruaidhrí Ó Flaithbheartaigh; 1186–1187 | | Son of Aodh Ó Flaithbheartaigh | unknown | 1197 |
| Muirchertaigh Mac Lochlainn; 1188–1196 | | Son of Muirchertach Mac Lochlainn | unknown | 1196 |
| Aodh Méith mac Aodha O'Neill; 1196–1201; 1201–1230 | | Son of Aodh an Macaoimh Tóinleasg O'Neill | Bean-Midhe | 1230 |
| Conchobhar Beg mac Conchobhair Mac Lochlainn; 1201 | | Son of Conchobar mac Muirchertaigh Mac Lochlainn son of Muirchertach Mac Lochlainn | unknown | 1201 |
| Niall Ruadh mac Aodha O'Neill; 1230 | | Son of Aodh an Macaoimh Tóinleasg O'Neill | Nuala O'Connor | 1235 |
| Domhnall mac Muirchertaigh Mac Lochlainn; 1230–1232; 1235–1238; 1239–1241 | | Son of Muirchertach Mac Muirchertaigh Mac Lochlainn son of Muirchertach Mac Lochlainn | unknown | 1241 |
| Domhnall Óg mac Aodha Méith O'Neill; 1232–1235 | | Son of Aodh Méith mac Aodha O'Neill | unknown | 1235 |
| Brian Chatha an Dúna O'Neill; 1238–1239; 1241–1260 | | Son of Niall Ruadh mac Aodha O'Neill and Nuala O'Connor | unknown | 16 May 1260 |
| Hugh Boy O'Neill; 1260–1261; 1263–1283 | | Son of Domhnall Óg mac Aodha Méith O'Neill | unknown | 1283 |
| Niall Culanach O'Neill; 1261–1263; 1286–1290 | | Son of Domhnall Óg mac Aodha Méith O'Neill | unknown | 1290 |
| Domhnall O'Neill; 1283–1286; 1290–1291; 1295–1325 | | Son of Brian O'Neill | Gormhflaith O'Donnell | 1325 |
| Brian O'Neill; 1291–1295 | | Son of Hugh Boy O'Neill and Eleanor de Angulo | unknown | 1295 |
| Henry O'Neill; 1325–1345 (Contested) | | Son of Brian O'Neill | unknown | 1347 |
| Aodh Reamhair O'Neill; 1325–1345 (Contested); 1345–1364 | | Son of Domhnall O'Neill and Gormflaith O'Donnell | unknown | 1364 |
| Niall Mór mac Aodha Reamhair O'Neill; 1364–1397 | | Son of Aodh Reamhair O'Neill | unknown | 1398 |
| Niall Óg mac Néill O'Neill; 1397–1402 | | Son of Niall Mór mac Aodha Reamhair O'Neill | Una O'Neil | 1403 |
| Brian Óg mac Néill Óg O'Neill; 1402–1403 | | Son of Niall Óg mac Néill O'Neill and Una O'Neill | unknown | 1403 |
| Domhnall mac Éinri Aimhreidh O'Neill; 1404–1410; 1414–1419; 1421–1432 | | Son of Éinri Aimhreidh O'Neill son of Niall Mór O'Neill | unknown | 1410 |
| Eoghan mac Néill Óg O'Neill; 1410–1414; 1419–1421; 1432–1455 | | Son of Niall Óg mac Néill O'Neill and Una O'Neill | Catherine MacMahon | 1456 |
| Éinri mac Eoghain O'Neill; 1455–1483 | | Son of Eoghan mac Néill Óg O'Neill | Gormhflaith MacMurrough-Kavanagh | 1484 |
| Conn Mór mac Éinri O'Neill; 1483–1493 | | Son of Éinri mac Eoghain O'Neill and Gormhflaith MacMurrough-Kavanagh | Cumach O'Cahan; Eleanor FitzGerald | 8 January 1493 |
| Éinri Óg mac Éinri O'Neill; 1493–1498 | | Son of Éinri mac Eoghain O'Neill and Gormhflaith MacMurrough-Kavanagh | unknown | 21 August 1498 |
| Domhnall Clarach O'Neill; 1498–1509 | | Son of Éinri mac Eoghain O'Neill and Gormhflaith MacMurrough-Kavanagh | unknown | 6 August 1509 |
| Art mac Aodh O'Neill; 1509–1513 | | Son of Aodh O'Neill of the Fews son of Eoghan mac Néill Óg O'Neill | unknown | 1513 |
| Art Oge O'Neill; 1513–1519 | | 1470; Son of Conn Mór mac Éinri O'Neill and Cumach O'Cahan | unknown | 1519 |
| Conn Bacagh O'Neill; 1519–1558 | | 1484; Son of Conn Mór mac Éinri O'Neill and Eleanor FitzGerald | Alice FitzGerald; Sorcha O'Neill | 16 July 1559 |
| Shane O'Neill; 1559–1567 | | 1530; Son of Conn O'Neill, 1st Earl of Tyrone and Alice FitzGerald | Catherine McDonnell; Margaret O'Donnell; Catherine MacLean | 2 June 1567; Cushendun |
| Turlough Luineach O'Neill; 1567–1593 | | 1532; Son of Niall Connellagh O'Neill son of Art Oge O'Neill | Agnes Campbell | 10 September 1595 |
| Hugh O'Neill; 1593–1607 | | 1550; Son of Matthew O'Neill, 1st Baron Dungannon (legitimised son of Conn O'Neill, 1st Earl of Tyrone to Alison Kelly) and Siobhan Maguire | Katherine O'Neill; Siobhán O'Donnell; Mabel Bagenal; Katherine Magennis | 20 July 1616; Rome |

It could also be argued that Conn Bacach had taken the title Earl of Tyrone in 1542, as part of the process of surrender and regrant, and in the process had waived his title. Whether he could waive it without consulting his clan derbfine is part of this debate.

Conn Bacach's grandson Hugh was not proclaimed king at Tullyhogue in 1593, but assumed the title after arranging to pay Turlough Luineach an annuity.

== See also ==
- List of High Kings of Ireland
- List of kings of Clandeboye
- List of kings of Tyrconnell
- List of kings of Ailech
- List of kings of Airgíalla
- List of kings of Dál nAraidi
- List of kings of Ulster
- List of kings of Dál Riata
