= Killowen Castle =

Castle at Killowen, County Down, Northern Ireland

Coordinates: 55°07′54″N 6°40′31″W

Killowen Castle: Irish: Caislen Cill Eoghain
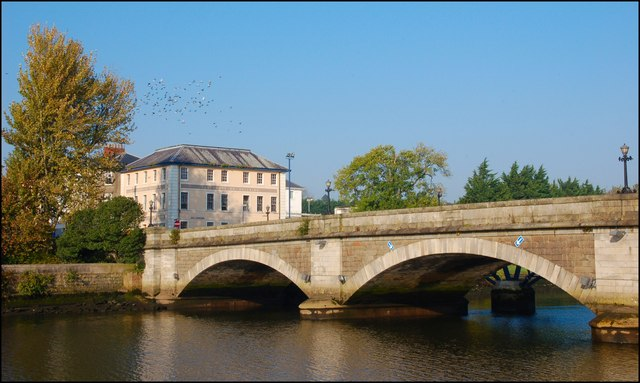
- The Town Bridge, Coleraine and Clothworkers Building (approximate site of Killowen castle)

- Location within Northern Ireland
- Irish grid reference: J84545 32407
- District: Causeway Coast and Glens
- County: County Londonderry
- Country: Northern Ireland
- Sovereign state: United Kingdom
- Post town: Coleraine
- Postcode district: BT51 / BT52
- Dialling code: 028
- UK Parliament: East Londonderry
- NI Assembly: East Londonderry

Killowen Castle (Irish: Caislen Cill Eoghain) was a castle situated in the parish of Killowen, County Londonderry, Northern Ireland. The area was once known as Drumtarsy (Druim-tairsigh) and the castle known as Drumtarsy castle. The name "Drumtarsy" is no longer commonly recognized in the local area. Its identification has been aided by historical records, notably the Ecclesiastical Taxation, which lists the church of Drumtarssi between those of Camus and Dunhoe within the Diocese of Derry. The location of Drumtarsy Castle is uncertain.

In 1213, according to the annals, English forces under Thomas mac Uchtry built a castle at Coleraine. This construction was considered a destructive event in the region, as most of the town’s cemeteries and buildings, except for the church, were dismantled to provide building materials. In 1288, a church, St. Eugene’s, was built to serve the castle and the surrounding community. The parish took its name from the church, originally known in Irish as Cill Eogain (meaning "Church of Eugene"). Over time, this name was anglicised to Killowen. The area was commonly referred to as "the Castle-side of the river." However, as Drumtarsy Castle deteriorated and was eventually demolished, the name lost relevance. The area later became known as the Waterside.

In the mid-13th century, the English crown concentrated its efforts on consolidating control over Ulster and Connacht. The death of Aed O’Neill in 1230 triggered a dynastic struggle within the Cenél Eóghain weakening their resistance to external forces. Donal Mac Lochlainn, with support from the Anglo-Norman administration in Dublin, initially subdued rival O’Neill claimants but was killed in 1241 at the Battle of Camergi, an unidentified site in County Tyrone, by Brian O’Neill, allied with the O’Donnells of Tír Conaill (modern-day County Donegal). Exploiting this instability, John FitzGeoffrey, Justiciar of Ireland under King Henry III, launched a campaign in 1248 to assert royal authority in Ulster. He conducted an eyre, likely reorganizing the province’s administration, and constructed a bridge across the River Bann at Coleraine. Crucially, he built a castle on the west bank of the Bann at Killowen, establishing a fortified base for military operations. From this position, FitzGeoffrey advanced against the Cenél Eóghain, who surrendered hostages and made peace. He later extended his campaign by building another castle at Magh Cobha (modern Ballyroney, County Down), enabling further incursions into central Ulster, reaching as far as Armagh.

Drumtarsy Castle remained in use into the late 14th century. In 1382, John Rynaux, Treasurer of Ulster, was ordered to repair the castle, along with the bridge of Coulrath (modern-day Coleraine) and the towers located on either side of the bridge.
