= Twescard =

County of the Earldom of Ulster, Ireland

Twescard (from Irish Tuaisceart 'north') is a former county of the Earldom of Ulster in medieval Ireland. Taking its name from the native Irish territory of in Tuaiscirt, it spanned the northern coastland of County Antrim and County Londonderry. At its height it stretched from Glenarm in the east of the Glens of Antrim to Inishowen in modern County Donegal. It was conquered and settled by Hugh de Lacy and was centered on Coleraine and the lower Bush valley. By the 1460s, the de Mandevilles abandoned and sold their remaining lands in Twescard to the McQuillans who renamed the territory the Route.

== The de Galloways and de Lacy ==
In 1210, when King John had taken control of the Earldom of Ulster from Hugh de Lacy, he granted land to those who had given him aid, primarily the Scoto-Norman de Galloways. Of them, he granted the Glens of Antrim from Larne to Glenarm to Duncan, Earl of Carrick, whilst he granted from the Glens of Antrim to Lough Foyle to Duncan's cousins; Alan, Lord of Galloway, and Thomas, Earl of Atholl. This territory had only been partially conquered beforehand and the de Galloways fought hard to win the land.

With King John's death in 1216, de Lacy sought to return to Ireland and retake the earldom, even though it meant defying the new king of England, Henry III. After landing in Ireland in 1223, de Lacy went about waging war in what the Annals of Connacht described as: produced assaults of war and dispersion amongst the Foreigners of Ireland. De Lacy retreated from his siege of Carrickfergus, however returned with the King of Tir Eoghain, Aed O'Neill. Together they destroyed Coleraine Castle of the Earl of Atholl.

By 1227, in return for giving two of his sons as hostage, de Lacy was given the Earldom of Ulster back; however, the northern coastlands that had been granted to the de Galloways were exempt.

== Twescard ==
De Lacy in his desire to reclaim all of his earldom, wasted little time in ignoring the terms of his reinstatement and drove the Scots out of northern Antrim, and granted a portion of their land to one of their traditional enemies, John Bisset. Due to de Lacy's help in conquering the province of Connacht, Henry III indulged his defiance of his reinstatement.

The northern coastlands of the Earldom of Ulster was known as Twescard, with its capital at Coleraine, and by the time of de Lacy's death in 1243, had become one of the most prosperous parts of his earldom.

Upon de Lacy's death in 1243, the earldom passed back into the hands of the English Crown, and though it was a troublesome entity, it would prove vital in penetrating deeper into Gaelic Ulster.

A dynastic dispute amongst the Cenél nEógain upon the death of Aed O'Neill in 1248 resulted in Henry III's chief governor in Ireland, John FitzGeoffrey, building a new bridge near Coleraine as well as a castle at Killowen opposite, and also another castle at Magh Cobha (Ballyroney) further south. From these positions in Twescard, FitzGeoffrey was able to invade central Ulster as far south as Armagh.

== The bailiwick, or county, of Twescard ==
By 1333, an inquisition into the Earldom of Ulster records it consisting of five bailiwicks, or counties, of which Twescard had become one. Each bailiwick was the responsibility of a sheriff or seneschal, who would usually be one of the earl's barons. They held the county court, as well as manorial courts, as well as collecting the rent for the earl's treasurer.

After the earl, there were four great baronial families in the earldom, each of which were the principal landlords, with most having land and estates in Twescard. The Bisset dynasty still retained their land in the Antrim Glens granted to them by de Lacy, whilst the Savage dynasty had most of their manors in Twescard. The de Mandevilles, who had come over with King John, held manors in north Antrim. A minor family, the de Sandel dynasty, acquired land in Twescard in 1300.

As vassals and substantial farmers were forbidden to build stone castles they lived in mottes instead, however this was not the case in Twescard as it was annexed after the age of the motte had passed by.

Infighting between the Norman families was not uncommon with the Fitzwarins and de Mandevilles warring, resulting in the loss of two thousand livestock of the Fitzwarins in their Twescard demesne.

The inquisition of 1333 also records the following towns that lay within the land of county Twescard: Le Roo (Limavady), Portkamen (Bushmills), and Portros (Portrush). The centre of Twescard, Coleraine, recorded as Coulrath, had a fortified bridge, was the forward position for raids into the north-west of Ulster, and vied with Downpatrick to be the second-most important settlement in the earldom after the capital Carrickfergus itself.

Near Coleraine, the castle of Mount Sandel, was used by the Normans to keep a precarious hold over their manors in Twescard.

== The end of Twescard ==
After the Irish invasion of Edward the Bruce in 1315, the Hiberno-Norman hold on Ulster was weakened. During the onset of the invasion, Domnal O'Neill advised Edward the Bruce to ravage the Earl of Ulster's settlements in Inishowen and the Roe Valley, with the Scots destroying the bridge at Coleraine and wasting all of the crops and barns to hinder the earl and his forces. By 1315 only Carrickfergus held out, with the rest of the earldom including Twescard overrun.

By the 1460s, with the earldom of Ulster near its final end, the surviving de Mandevilles of north Antrim, deserted their manors in Twescard and sold their interests to the MacQuillans, who themselves had been driven out of Down. The MacQuillans had served as mercenaries of the earls of Ulster, and originally came from the south-west of Scotland. They renamed Twescard, now a shadow of its former size, An Rúta (the Route), from whence it was known until the recreation of County Antrim in 1584.

== See also ==
- Earldom of Ulster
- Route, County Antrim
