= Brian O'Neill (High-King of Ireland) =

High King of Ireland from 1258 to 1260

High King of Ireland
- Reign: 1258–1260
- Predecessor: Rory O'Connor (1166–1198)
- Successor: None; Edward Bruce as claimant (1315–1318)

King of Tyrone
- Reign: 1238–1260
- Predecessor: Donnell Og O'Neill
- Successor: Hugh Boy O'Neill
- Died: c. 14 May 1260 near Downpatrick, Ireland
- Issue: Donnell O'Neill
- Dynasty: Northern Uí Néill (Cenél nEógain)
- Father: Niall Roe O'Neill
- Mother: Nuala Ní Conchobair

Brian O'Neill, also known as Brian "of the battle of Down" O'Neill (Irish: Brian Chatha an Dúna Ua Néill; died c. 14 May 1260), was the King of Tír Eoghain from 1238 and the High King of Ireland from 1258 to 1260.

== Rise to power ==
In 1230 Hugh O'Neill (Aedh Ó Néill), king of Tyrone, died and was succeeded by Donnell MacLaughlin. MacLaughlin however was removed in 1238 by the Justiciar of Ireland, Maurice FitzGerald, 2nd Lord of Offaly, and Hugh de Lacy, 1st Earl of Ulster, who installed "the son of O'Neill", presumed to have been Brian, and took the hostages of the Cenel Owen and Cenel Connell. However it may have been Brian's cousin Donnell, who afterwards was killed by MacLaughlin. After this O'Neill claimed the kingship of the O'Neill dynasty as well as Tyrone, possibly with the aid of Hugh de Lacy, 1st Earl of Ulster.

In revenge, O'Neill with the aid of Melaghlin O'Donnell, king of Tyrconnell, defeated MacLoughlin and ten of his closest kinsmen at the battle of Camergi, somewhere within Tyrone north of Omagh, in 1241. This ended the long rivalry between the MacLoughlin's and O'Neill's, with the MacLoughlin's afterwards excluded from the kingship of Tyrone and Ailech.

In 1244, Henry III of England sent letters to various Gaelic Irish lords, including O'Neill, requesting their aid in a military campaign against the Kingdom of Scotland. In the end the issue was sorted out diplomatically. Copies of the letter were also distributed to O'Neill's sub-chiefs including his tánaiste, Hugh Boy O'Neill.

A consequence of this infighting between the rival factions of the Cenél Eoghain allowed the Normans to advance deeper into Gaelic Ulster, however in 1243 de Lacy died. Thus the Earldom of Ulster reverted to the English Crown and was taken over by royal administrators. John FitzGeoffrey, the king's chief governor in Ireland, erected a bridge across the River Bann and built castles at Coleraine and Ballyroney in Iveagh. From here FitzGeoffrey was able to penetrate deeper into Tyrone.

== Conflict with O'Donnell ==
Despite ending MacLoughlin aspirations to the kingship, O'Neill would form a marriage alliance with them, however this resulted in a war with the O'Donnells of Tyrconnell. Subsequently in 1248 O'Neill backed the king of Tyrconnell, Rory O'Cannon (Ruaidri Ua Canannáin), against the claims of O'Donnell. O'Cannon had been set up in the kingship by FitzGerald, however rather than backing him, entered Tyrconnell and removed him in favour of Goffraid O'Donnell.

O'Cannon, who had been expelled to Tyrone, and O'Neill, once again led their forces into Tyrconnell to confront O'Donnell, however they were defeated with O'Cannon slain.

That same year John FitzGeoffrey, who replaced FitzGerald as Justiciar in 1246, entered Tyrone and took the submission and hostages of O'Neill. A resolution had been adopted at a meeting of the Cenel Owen that "since the power of the Foreigners was over the Gaeidhel of Erinn, to give hostages to the Foreigners, and to make peace with them, for the sake of their country."

== Conflict ==
In 1249 the king of Connacht, Felim O'Connor, was given refuge from the Normans by O'Neill. In 1252, O'Neill and his brother gave their submissions to the Justiciar of Ireland, who had marched to Armagh with a large force. A Rory O'Neill was given as hostage.

In 1253 as a sign of defiance against his vassal status with the Earldom of Ulster O'Neill withheld his tribute to it and raided Iveagh, destroying the castle at Ballyroney. He also launched an offensive against the Normans in Leinster. That same year the son of Maurice FitzGerald led his forces into Tyrone to attack O'Neill, however he failed to take his submission or hostages and after battle suffered a heavy defeat at the hands of O'Neill.

In 1255 he made a pact with Felim O'Connor's son Hugh, where by allowing Hugh free rein in the kingdom of Breifne, he would aid O'Neill against the Normans of the earldom who were eroding his territory.

In 1257 the king of Tyrconnell, Goffraid O'Donnell, had been mortally wounded in battle against the FitzGeralds, and O'Neill used this opportunity to try to exact Tyrconnell's submission. As the Cenel Connell discussed what to do, Goffraid's youngest brother, Donnell Og, returned from fosterage and was conferred the chieftainship of Tyrconnell. He refused to submit O'Neill stating the Scottish proverb "Every man should have his own world".

== High King of Ireland ==
FitzGerald in 1252 had built a castle at Caoluisce, on the banks of Lough Erne, near modern-day Belleek, County Fermanagh, however in 1258 it was the site where O'Neill, in the presence of his ally O'Connor, was inaugurated as "King of the Gael of Erin". Whilst he received hostages from O'Connor and from O'Brien of Thomond, along with several other minor Kings from Meath and Munster, his claim was not recognised by those of the Irish closest to him including the other O'Neill factions, the O'Donnells of Tyrconnell, the MacMahons of Airgíalla, and the O'Rourkes of Breifne. Indeed the following year O'Donnell would lead an attack into Tyrone.

== Battle of Down and death ==
In 1260 O'Neill along with his O'Connor allies, launched an attack on the Normans of the Earldom of Ulster at Drumderg, near its capital at Downpatrick in modern County Down, Northern Ireland. The Normans levied the town, and with the aid of forces brought by Sir Roger des Auters, O'Neill and his allies were decisively defeated at the subsequent battle of Down. The Annals of Inisfallen state that the forces recruited by the Normans consisted mostly of native Irish and that the Normans played only a minor role.

In the battle, O'Neill was killed along with many other Irish nobles including over a dozen members of the O'Cahans. O'Neill's head was cut off by the Normans and sent to King Henry III of England, a sign of how dangerous his coalition was thought to be.

After this battle, Brian would become known in Irish as Brian Chatha an Dúna, meaning 'Brian of the Battle of Down'.

== Lineage and successors ==
Brian was the son of Niall Roe (Ruadh), and grandson of Áed in Macáem Tóinlesc. His wife was Nuala O'Connor (Ní Conchobair), a daughter of Rory O'Connor the last High King of Ireland before the Norman invasion. Therefore, through his mother, he would have been descended from Brian Boru.

After Brian's death the kingship of the Cenel Owen and with it Tyrone was taken by his cousin's son, Hugh Boy O'Neill, ancestor of the Clandeboye O'Neill's, who also had the support of the earldom of Ulster. Upon Hugh's death in 1283 Brian's son Donnell seized the kingship, which until 1295 was highly contested between him and his second-cousin Niall Culanach and Hugh Boy's son Brian, until he won outright control by killing his opponents.

== In poetry ==
Giolla Brighde Mac Con Midhe wrote the lament Aoidhe mo chroidhe ceann Briain (Brian's head is the care of my heart).

== Bibliography ==
- Bardon, Jonathan (2005). History of Ulster. The Black Staff Press. ISBN 9-780856-407642.
- Connolly, S.J. (2006). Oxford Companion to Irish History. Oxford University Press. ISBN 9-780199-234837.
- Duffy, Sean (2005). Medieval Ireland An Encyclopedia. Routledge. ISBN 0-415-94052-4.
- Foster, Robert Fitzroy (2001). The Oxford illustrated history of Ireland. Oxford University Press. ISBN 978-0-19-289323-9.
- Orpen, Goddard H. (1915). The Normans in Tirowen and Tirconnell. Vol. Sixth Series, Vol. 5, No. 4 (31 December 1915). The Journal of the Royal Society of Antiquaries of Ireland.

Brian O'Neill (High-King of Ireland) O'Neill Dynasty Cadet branch of the Cenél nEógain Died: c. 14 May 1260
Regnal titles
| Vacant Title last held by Rory O'Connor | — TITULAR — High King of Ireland; 1258–1260 | Vacant Title next held by Edward Bruce |
| Preceded by Donnell Og O'Neill | King of Tyrone; 1238–1260 | Succeeded by Hugh Boy O'Neill |
