= Donnell O'Neill =

Donnell O'Neill may refer to:

- Donnell Claragh O'Neill (died 1509), member of the O'Neill dynasty of Tír Eoghain, Ulster
- Donnell O'Neill (d. 1325), king of Tyrone in medieval Ireland
