= Donnchad Ua Cerbaill =

Donnchad Ua Cerbaill or Donnchadh Ó Cearbhaill, king of Airgíalla, fl. c. 1130–1168.

Ua Cerbaill was a supporter of the Irish religious reform movement of the 12th century. He was a close associate of Saint Malachy, and with him founded Mellifont Abbey, the first Cistercian abbey to be built in Ireland. He was also responsible for foundations by the Arrouaisian order at Louth, Knock Abbey and Termonfeckin. Saint Malachy's brother Christian (Gilla Críst Ua Morgair) served as Bishop of Clogher in the Ua Cerbhaill kingdom from 1126 to 1138 at the time Donnchad came to power.

Donnchad was central to the successful overthrow and killing of Muirchertach Mac Lochlainn, High King of Ireland, who in violation of an oath had blinded Donnchad's foster-son Eochaid Mac Duinn Sléibe the king of Ulaid in 1166. Afterwards he placed Áed in Macáem Tóinlesc, ruler of Tulach Óc, on the throne of Ailech reviving the O'Neill lineage's control of Tír Eoghain and dividing the power of the Ailech polity for 75 years.

He was a uterine half-brother of Tigernán Ua Ruairc, King of Bréifne, both sharing as mother Aillend, daughter of Ua Baegelláin, a Fir Manach local ruler.

Ua Cerbhaill was a successful political operator on both a regional and local level during the period of instability associated with "High Kings with Opposition". At this time, c. 1076–1166, provincial armies repeatedly criss-crossed the area of County Louth, there were multiple divisions of the unstable Kingdom of Midhe, and frequent changes of kings and a new practice of imposing external candidates as local kings.

Early in his career, from his Clann Cearbhaill base in Fearmaigh and west Louth, Ua Cerbhaill conquered the sub-kingdom of Conaille Muirtheimne (c. 1130) in north Louth, raided across Meath into Fingal, the Viking settlement north of Dublin, and closely cooperated with the northern power of Muirchertach Mac Lochlainn in his actions in Ulaid and Midhe. This enabled him to take the Midhe sub-kingdom of Fir Arda Ciannachta into his kingdom (by c. 1140), and extend his influence around Newry and the area of Bairrche (the Mournes) in south County Down. He settled Airghialla vassal groups under pressure from the Cenél nEoghain in the north and west onto his conquests; the Uí Méith on the Conaille of Cuailgne, on the south side of Carlingford Lough gave their name to the district of Omeath, and the Mugdorna on the north side of the Lough gave their name to the Mournes. Their Mhigh Eotach or Mac Eochy clan gave their name to Ballymageogh townland and Slievemageogh a mountain in the Mourne district. According to the Annals of Ulster around 1165 when Muirchertach Mac Lochlainn permitted Eochaidh Mac Duinn Sleibhethe to become king of Ulaid he was given the territory of Bairrche and he then passed it to Eochaidh's foster-father Donnchadh Ó Cearbhaill, lord of Airgíalla.

Donnchad Ua Cerbaill's religious foundations show his success in tying the reform movements interests to his own, facilitating as they did the consolidation of conquests he made. In alienating older religious sites from local dynasts, who traditionally held them hereditarily, to European institutional orders he undermined their use as a power base for future opposition. Thus, Newry, County Down, possibly refounded in 1142 (and again in 1153 by Cistercians from Mellifont), Termonfeckin Abbey situated in Fir Arda Ciannachta about 1144, Knock Abbey before 1148 and Louth Priory in 1148 were connected to Ua Cerbaill's reform actions. By also granting recently taken lands on the edge of his power for the new foundation of Mellifont in 1142, he prevented future territorial loss by creating a vested interest for the religious orders in maintaining the status quo, and the former overlord of the lands of Mellifont, the king of Midhe, Donnchadh Ua Mael Sechlainn, was excommunicated at a Mellifont session of the Synod of 1152.

To reflect Ua Cerbaill's conquests the area of County Louth was transferred, between c. 1140 to c. 1190, from the see of Armagh to the see of Clogher. During this period the Bishop of Clogher (frequently referred to as 'Bishop of Airgíalla' in the chronicles) used the style Bishop of Louth. This change reflects the shift in center of the Ua Cerbhaill Uí Chremthainn sub-kingdom south within Airgíalla from the time of the Synod of Ráth Breasail in 1111 to the 1130s when Ua Cerbaill was establishing his base of power in Fernmag and around the settlement of Louth, traditionally the tuath of Fir Rois/Crích Rois. This shift was precipitated by expansion of the Cenél Fearadhaigh Theas, a powerful Cenél nEoghain group, into Magh Leamhna, the Clogher Valley. The title Bishop of Clogher was resumed after 1193, when County Louth was restored to the see of Armagh. By that time the Ua Cerbhaill family had been eclipsed and County Louth or 'English' Oriel had been lost to the Norman colony.

According to the Annals of Ulster, Ua Cerbaill was mortally wounded while drunk with the [battle-]axe of a serving gillie of his own, namely, Ua Duibhne of Cenel-Eogain. He was buried in Mellifont Abbey in the sanctuary. His tomb is at the gospel side (the north) of the high altar in an arched recess surrounded with an ornamental moulding.

== Sources ==
- High-Kings with Opposition, 1072-1166, Marie Therese Flanagan;
- Latin Learning and Literature in Ireland, 1169-1500, A. B. Scott;
- "Church and Politics, c.750-c.1100", Francis John Byrne in A New History of Ireland, volume one, 2008. ISBN 978-0-19-922665-8
- "Ua Cerbaill, Donnchad", pp. 565–566, Aidan Breen, in Dictionary of Irish Biography from the Earliest Times to the Year 2002: Volume 9, Staines - Z, edited by James McGuire and James Quinn, Cambridge, 2010.
