= Tirlough Brassileagh O'Neill =

Irish prince

Tirlough Brassileagh O'Neill (Irish: Toirrdhealbhach Brassileagh Ó Néill) was the son of Phelim Caoch O'Neill, a prince of the Cenél nEógain.

A grandson of Conn O'Neill, 1st Earl of Tyrone, then king and later earl of Tyrone, he was fostered by the McCann clan in the area to the south of Lough Neagh known as Clan Brassill area.

When Tirlough's father died in 1542, he and his family were quickly pushed aside by the internal politics of O'Neill dominated Ulster. As a grandson of Conn Bacach, he would eventually be able to attempt a try at the chiefship of all the O'Neills, and thus was seen as a threat by his uncles Shane O'Neill and Mathew Kelly (Ferdocha), baron of Dungannon.

In spite of his uncles warfare and attempts to push him out, Tirlough eventually outlived both uncles and grew to some importance in the turmoil of the later 16th century. Tirlough stood for election as The O'Neill in 1583 when it was thought that Turlough Luineach O'Neill, the reigning O'Neill, had died, and led sizeable groups of fighting men in 1575 and throughout the 1590s during the Nine Years' War. He is listed as having the ability to raise "50 Horse and 200 foot" soldiers out of his territories at 24 hours' notice to fight.

Tirlough again made a bid for the lordship in the 1590s, but his cousin, Hugh O'Neill, 3rd Earl of Tyrone, bought him off with a gift of territory. In 1595 the English make reference to Tirlough as being part of the leadership in Ulster, but too old to worry about, and he died sometime after.

Tirlough was married to an Anabla O'Reilly. They had children: Conn and Hugh McShane O'Neill. These sons were fought in the Nine Years' War raiding neighboring clans, and in the 1608 Rebellion.

== Sources ==
- Annals of the Four Masters
- Pardon Rolls of King James I
- State Papers of Ireland
