= Etymological list of counties of Ireland =

Etymological list of counties of Ireland is a list of the origins of the names of the traditional counties of Ireland, both north and south, including counties that are no longer used.

Unless otherwise stated, the origin of a name is from Irish.

== Counties ==
County name	Established	Province	Irish name	Derivation
Antrim	c.1400	Ulster	Aontroim	Named after the town of Antrim, which comes from Aontroim, meaning "lone ridge". It was formerly spelt Aontruim. An older alternative name was Aontreibh meaning "lone dwelling". The county was formed by merging a number of other counties in the Earldom of Ulster, notable Twescard, from the Irish Tuaisceart, "North" and Carrickfergus, from the Irish Carraig Fhearghais, named after Fergus Mór mac Eirc, the 6th-century king of Dál Riata.
Armagh	1584/5	Ulster	Ard Mhacha	Named after the town of Armagh, which comes from Ard Mhacha, meaning "Macha's height". Macha was an Irish goddess associated with Ulster and Armagh, where she is said to have given birth to twins after racing a horse.
Carlow	1210	Leinster	Ceatharlach	Named after the town of Carlow, which comes from Ceatharlach, meaning "place of cattle".
Cavan	1579	Ulster	An Cabhán	Named after the town of Cavan, which comes from An Cabhán, meaning "the hollow".
Clare	1565	Munster	An Clár	Possibly named after the town of Clarecastle, which is made up of the Irish clár ("plain") and the English castle. Alternatively, it may come from the Norman de Clare family, who took their name in turn from the English town of Clare, which probably gets its name from the Latin clarus, "clear". Before 1565, the county was known as County Thomond (Irish Tuamhain, from Tuadhmhumhain, meaning "North Munster").
Cork	c. 1200	Munster	Corcaigh	Named after the city of Cork, which comes from corcach, meaning "swamp".
Donegal	1584/5	Ulster	Dún na nGall	Named after the town of Donegal, which comes from Dún na nGall, meaning "stronghold of the foreigners" (i.e. the Vikings). An alternative name for the county is Tyrconnell or Tirconnell, after a Gaelic territory of the same name. This comes from Tír Chonaill, meaning "land of Conall" and is named after Conall Gulban, a son of Niall of the Nine Hostages, whose descendants founded the territory. Conall means "Strong Wolf" in Irish.
Down	early 16th century	Ulster	An Dún	The name is derived from Dún ná Lethglas, the capital of the Dál Fiatach, now modern day Downpatrick.
Dublin	1185	Leinster	Áth Cliath/Duibhlinn	Named after the city of Dublin, which comes from Duibhlinn, meaning "black pool". Áth Cliath means "hurdled ford" and is the main Irish name for Dublin.
Fermanagh	1584/5	Ulster	Fear Manach	"Men of Manach". Manach may come from Old Irish Magh Eanagh, "Country of the Lakes", making the whole derivation "Men (or Tribe) of the Country of the Lakes".
Galway	1565	Connacht	Gaillimh	Named after the city of Galway, which was named after the river Gaillimh (meaning "stoney"). The older name was Dún Bhun na Gaillimhe, "stronghold at the mouth of the Gaillimh".
Kerry	c. 1200	Munster	Ciarraí	"People of Ciar". From Ciar ("black" or "dark brown"), a personal name, and Raighe ("people" or "tribe"). The Ciar after whom Ciarrai is named was Ciar mac Fergus, son of Fergus mac Róich, ex King of Ulster, and Queen Meabh of Connacht, both major characters of the Ulster Cycle.
Kildare	1297	Leinster	Cill Dara	Named after the town of Kildare, which comes from Cill Dara, meaning "church of the oak".
Kilkenny	c. 1200	Leinster	Cill Chainnigh	Named after the town of Kilkenny, which comes from Cill Chainnigh, meaning "church of Cainnech". Saint Cainnech allegedly converted the county to Christianity in 597.
Laois	1556	Leinster	Laois	Named after the Gaelic territory of Uí Laoighis, meaning "people of Lugaid Laígne". Lugaid was granted lands after driving out forces from Munster. His name derives from Lugh. Laois was originally called Queen's County, after Queen Mary ("Bloody Mary") who created the county in 1556. After the creation of the Irish Free State, it was given its current name.
Leitrim	1565–83	Connacht	Liatroma	Named after the village of Leitrim. The name 'Leitrim' itself is derived from the Irish Liath Druim, meaning 'grey ridge', and is a commonplace name throughout Ireland.
Limerick	c. 1200	Munster	Luimneach	Named after the city of Limerick, whose Irish name possibly means "bare spot". The Vikings called it Hlymrekr, which might be a transliteration of the Irish or could mean "mighty noise" from Old Norse hlym ("noise") and rekr ("mighty").
Londonderry	1613/1585	Ulster	Doire	"Oak wood". From Daire Coluimb Chille, "The Oak-wood of Saint Columba". Columba comes from the Latin for "Dove". Previously Daire Calgaich, "The Oak-wood of Calgach". Calgach may have been Calgacus. The name may come from Proto-Celtic *calg-ac-os, "Possessing a Blade" or "Possessing a Penis". The prefix "London" was added in 1613, after the town had been rebuilt across the river from its previous site, in recognition of donations from the livery companies of the City of London which had enabled the English and Scottish settlers to colonise the site. This was the same time as the County was formed. There is some dispute over whether to use the name Londonderry or Derry. Most of the area for County Londonderry came from the previous County Coleraine, which was formed in 1585. Coleraine comes from Cúil Raithin, "Nook of the Ferns".
Longford	1586	Leinster	An Longfort	Named after the town of Longford, which comes from An Longfort, meaning "the port". The earlier spelling was An Longphoirt. The term was invented by Irish chroniclers to describe a Viking ship enclosure or fortress. Longford was split off from county Westmeath in 1586.
Louth	c. 1200	Leinster	Lú	Named after the village of Louth, which was named after the Irish god Lugh (modern spelling Lú).
Mayo	1565	Connacht	Maigh Eo	Named after the village of Mayo, which comes from Maigh Eo, meaning "plain of the yew".
Meath	1297	Leinster	An Mhí	"The middle". Meath was once one of the five provinces of Ireland, and the one in which the High King sat. It was formed into a county in 1297, the boundaries of which were not strictly defined. At one point it encompassed all of counties Meath, Westmeath and Longford. It was formally divided into Meath and Westmeath in 1542.
Monaghan	1585	Ulster	Muineachán	Named after the town of Monaghan, which comes from Muineachán. "Muine" means "brake" (a thickly overgrown area) or "hillock", hence the county council's interpretation as "land of the little hills". It could also derive from "Muine Acháin", "Acháin" meaning "field", and so making "bushy field" or "hilly field".
Offaly	1556	Leinster	Uíbh Fhailí	Named after the Gaelic territory of Uí Failghe, which existed from the 6th century until the death of its last king, Brian mac Cathaoir O Conchobhair Failghe, in 1556. After this, it was divided into Queen's County (modern day County Laois) and King's County (modern day County Offaly.) King's County was named after Queen Mary's Consort, Philip. The name was restored to Offaly after the creation of the Irish Free State.
Roscommon	c. 1292	Connacht	Ros Comáin	Named after the town of Roscommon, which comes from Ros Comáin, meaning "Comán's wood". It was named after Saint Coman, who founded the monastery of Roscommon around 550.
Sligo	1565	Connacht	Sligeach	Named after the town of Sligo, which comes from Sligeach, meaning "shelly place"; a reference to the large amounts of shellfish to be found in the river and its estuary.
Tipperary	13th century	Munster	Tiobraid Árann	Named after the town of Tipperary, which comes from Tiobraid Árann, meaning "well of the Arra"; a reference to the river which flows through it.
Tyrone	1585	Ulster	Tír Eoghain	Named after the Gaelic territory of Tír Eoghain, meaning "Land of Eoghan". It was named after king Eógan mac Néill, a son of king Niall of the Nine Hostages. Eógan founded the Kingdom of Ailech, which eventually became Tyrone.
Waterford	c. 1200	Munster	Port Láirge	Named after the city of Waterford, which comes from Old Norse Veðrafjǫrðr ("ram fjord"). The Irish name Port Láirge means "Larag's port" and was historically anglicised as Portlarga.
Westmeath	1542	Leinster	An Iarmhí	Named after the old province of Meath. An Iarmhí also means "West Meath" or, fully translated, "West Middle".
Wexford	1200	Leinster	Loch Garman	Named after the town of Wexford, which comes from Old Norse Veisafjǫrðr ("fjord of the mud flats"). The Irish name Loch Garman means "Garman's lake/inlet" and is named after a legendary character called Garman Garbh, who was drowned in the mudflats at the mouth of the river Slaney by an enchantress, resulting in the lake that bears his name. Loch Garman was historically anglicised as Lochgarman or Loughgarman.
Wicklow	1607	Leinster	Cill Mhantáin	Named after the town of Wicklow, which comes from Old Norse Víkingalág or Vikinga-ló ("meadow of the Vikings"). The Irish name Cill Mhantáin means "Church of Mantan" and is named after a contemporary of Saint Patrick who had his teeth knocked out by Irish pagans. Hence he was renamed Mantan, which means "toothless one" in Irish. Cill Mhantáin was historically anglicised as Kilmantan.
