= Brian O'Neill (d. 1295) =

King of Tyrone

Brian O'Neill (Irish: Brian Ó Néill) (c.1265–1296) was a king of Tyrone in medieval Ireland. He was the son of Hugh Boy O'Neill.

In 1291, O'Neill ascended to the kingship of Tyrone after the death of his uncle Niall Culanach O'Neill with the aid of the de Mandeville and Bisset vassals of Richard Óg de Burgh, 2nd Earl of Ulster. Niall Culanach had been killed by his kin; the deposed king of Tyrone, Donnell O'Neill, son of Brian O'Neill of the battle of Down.

In 1295, O'Neill and his Norman supporters were defeated by Donnell O'Neill at the Battle of Creeve. O'Neill was killed during this battle. O'Neill's son, Henry, would also become a king of Tyrone and found the lordship of Clandeboye.

Brian O'Neill O'Neill Dynasty Cadet branch of the Cenél nEógain Born: c.1265 Died: 1295
Regnal titles
Preceded by Niall Culanach O'Neill	King of Tyrone; 1291-1295	Succeeded by Donnell O'Neill
