= Hugh Boy O'Neill =

King of Ailech

Hugh Boy O'Neill (Irish: Aed Buide Ó Néill) was the last ruler of the Cenél nEógain to be styled as king of Ailech and was the eponymous ancestor of the Clandeboye O'Neill's in medieval Ireland. The son of Donnell Og O'Neill, he succeeded to the kingship of Ailech after the death of Brian O'Neill at the battle of Down in 1260. His name in English translates as "Blonde Hugh" on account of his hair colour giving rise to the English alias Hugh the Blond or Hugh the Fair.

== Career ==
In 1259 O'Neill along with Donnell Óg O'Donnell, king of Tyrconnell, led an expedition into Tyrone where his fathers first-cousin Brian O'Neill was king. They burned the country before passing into Airgíalla and taking the hostages of everywhere they went.

He would become king of Tyrone in 1260 after the death Brian at the battle of Down, however his brother Niall Culanach contested the kingship and sized it in 1261, holding it until Hugh Boy expelled him from it in 1262 and killed his main ally, Donnsléibe McCawell. The next year he managed to take the overlordship of the MacMahon's of Airgíalla.

O'Neill was assigned as guardian of the marches of the Earldom of Ulster, in which he received a fee for. Around 1263, O'Neill married Eleanor, daughter of Miles de Angulo and cousin of Walter de Burgh, 1st Earl of Ulster. He was also close friends with the keeper of the Crown's lands in north Antrim, Henry de Mandeville.

In 1265 O'Neill accompanied de Burgh in an expedition into Tyrconnell. In a document dated 2 October 1269 O'Neill acknowledged de Burgh as his overlord whom he held his title from. In return O'Neill received de Burgh's aid against his O'Neill and O'Donnell rivals. It was stipulated that if O'Neill broke the agreement that he could be stripped of the kingship with it granted or sold to someone else.

In the early 1270s O'Neill along with some of his sub-chiefs, including O'Cahan, are mentioned in credits for accompanying the Justiciar of Ireland, James de Audley, in some expeditions. Around this time a feud would arise within the Earldom between the de Mandeville's and the seneschal of Ulster, William FitzWarin. O'Neill took the side of Sir Henry and Sir Robert de Mandeville and is noted in 1273 along with his O'Cahan vassals as having burned five towns before FitzWarin routed them. Niall Culanach, now king of Inishowen (a sub-kingdom within Tyrone) saw an opportunity following this and offered his assistance to King Edward I to destroy O'Neill and alleged that he had some protection from the authorities in Dublin. O'Neill however later that year received a lenient pardon for his part in the feud, even though it would drag on until 1276 when the de Mandeville's were defeated.

At the battle of Desertcreat in 1281, the forces of O'Neill along with those of the new seneschal of Ulster, Thomas de Mandeville, decisively defeated and killed Donnell Óg O'Donnell and many of his sub-chiefs greatly curbing the power of his Cenél Conaill rivals.

== Death and succession ==
O'Neill reigned until his death in 1283 when he killed by Brian McMahon of Airgíalla and Gilla Ísa O'Reilly. O'Neill was succeeded by Donnell O'Neill, son of Brian O'Neill of the battle of Down. His son Brian with the backing of Richard Óg de Burgh, 2nd Earl of Ulster, would replace Donnell as king of Tyrone in 1291.

Hugh Boy O'Neill O'Neill Dynasty Cadet branch of the Cenél nEógain Died: 1283
Regnal titles
Preceded by Brian O'Neill	King of Ailech; 1st reign 1260-1261	Succeeded by Niall Culanach O'Neill
Preceded by Brian O'Neill	King of Tyrone; 1st reign 1260-1261	Succeeded by Niall Culanach O'Neill
Preceded by Niall Culanach O'Neill	King of Ailech; 2nd reign 1262-1283	Office abolished
Preceded by Niall Culanach O'Neill	King of Tyrone; 2nd reign 1262-1283	Succeeded by Donnell O'Neill
