= Geraldine League =

Irish alliance established in 1539

- Coat of arms
- Demonym: Geraldine
- Membership: O'Donnell Family; O'Neill Family; O'Brian Family; Other local Irish families
- Government: Military alliance
  - Founders: Manus O'Donnell, Conn O'Neill
- Establishment: 1539
- Today part of: Ireland

The Geraldine League was a short-lived Irish alliance established in 1539 by Manus O'Donnell and Conn O'Neill.

== History ==
The league was founded with the goal of restoring Gerald FitzGerald to the earldom of Kildare. The movement ultimately grew to encompass the goal of expelling the English from Ireland, and in the fall of 1539 the League invaded and looted The Pale. After sacking the towns of Ardee and Navan, the League withdrew from Pale and were caught by surprise by the forces of Lord Deputy Leonard Gray, who ultimately routed them at the Battle of Belahoe. The League gradually dissolved over the course of the next few years with the arrival of a new Lord Deputy, Anthony St. Leger, who was able to restore order to English-controlled Ireland.
