= Donnell O'Neill (d. 1325) =

Donnell O'Neill (Irish: Domhnall Ua Néill) was a king of Tyrone in medieval Ireland. He was the son of Brian O'Neill of the battle of Down. O'Neill was king of Tyrone on several occasions contesting the kingship with his kinsman Niall Culanach and Brian O'Neill who both had the support of the Earldom of Ulster.

O'Neill was seemingly only a boy when his father was killed at the Battle of Down in 1260. He married Gormflaith, the daughter of Donnell Óg O'Donnell, king of Tyrconnell. His father-in-law was killed in 1281 by O'Neill's cousin and rival, Hugh Boy O'Neill, at the Battle of Desertcreat. O'Neill is perhaps best known for sending a Remonstration to Pope John XXII in 1317, in which he complains of the actions of the English in Ireland, calling on the Pope to support Edward Bruce as King of Ireland (brother of Robert the Bruce, King of Scots).

== King of Tyrone ==
In 1283 Hugh Boy died and O'Neill assumed the kingship. Three years later Richard Óg de Burgh, 2nd Earl of Ulster, forcibly removed O'Neill and installed O'Neill's cousin and Hugh Boy's brother, Niall Culanach O'Neill, as king in his place. In 1290 O'Neill would regain the kingship only to be deposed once more by the earl in 1291 in favour of Niall. That year he killed his rival, however before he could reclaim the kingship, the earl had installed Hugh Boy's son, Brian as king in his place.

With the support of his brother Niall, O'Neill would rebuild his strength and at the Battle of Creeve in 1295 would defeat the combined forces of Brian and the English, with the former being killed. O'Neill once more took the kingship of Tyrone. A period of relative calm between the O'Neill rivals appears to have ensued over the next decade, however in 1306 one Donnell Tuirtreach O'Neill was killed in O'Neill's household.

De Burgh would continue to undermine O'Neill's kingship, and having extended the earldom all the way along the north coast to Inishowen exerted pressure on Tyrone. In 1312-1313 Dermot O'Cahan acknowledged de Burgh as his overlord and that his lands at Glenconkeyne were held from him. These lands were then granted to the Clandeboye O'Neill's, the offspring of Hugh Boy who sought to retake the kingship of Tyrone.

== Bruce invasion ==
In 1314 O'Neill sought the aid of the king of Scotland, Robert Bruce, against the Normans. Edward Bruce was sent to Ireland and during the Bruce campaign in Ireland. Despite this in 1314 he was asked for his aid against Bruce. With the defeat of Bruce in 1318, O'Neill was deposed from the kingship in 1319 by the Normans and Henry O'Neill of the Clandeboye O'Neill's. O'Neill fled to Fermanagh where he received the protection of Flaherty Maguire, however he and his supporters were plundered by the inhabitants. Not long after this he regained his kingship however his son and successor, Brian, was killed in Maghera by the Clandeboye O'Neill's and Henry MacDavill.

== Death and legacy ==
O'Neill died in 1325 at Lough Laoghaire, the location of a crannog near Dungannon. That same year his son Cooley (Cú Uladh) was killed by O'Neill's nephews through his brother Niall. He had another son, Áed Remar O'Neill, who became king of Tyrone in 1345. He was succeeded by Hugh Boy O'Neill's grandson Henry.

Donnell O'Neill O'Neill Dynasty Cadet branch of the Cenél nEógain Died: 1325
Regnal titles
Preceded by Hugh Boy O'Neill	King of Tyrone; 1st reign 1283-1286	Succeeded by Niall Culanach O'Neill
Preceded by Niall Culanach O'Neill	King of Tyrone; 2nd reign 1290-1291	Succeeded by Brian O'Neill
Preceded by Brian O'Neill	King of Tyrone; 3rd reign 1295-1319	Unknown
Unknown	King of Tyrone; 4th reign Aft. 1319-1325	Succeeded by Henry O'Neill
