= Áed in Macáem Tóinlesc =

- King of Tír Eogain
- Reign: c. 1167–1177 [with opposition] c. 1170–1174 [supreme]
- Successor: Máel Sechlainn Mac Lochlainn / Áed Méith
- Died: 1177
- Issue: Áed Méith, Niall Ruadh
- Middle Irish: Áed mac Muirchertaig, "in Macáem Tóinlesc"
- Modern Irish: Aodh mac Muircheartaigh, "an Macaoimh Tóinleasg"

Áed in Macáem Tóinlesc or Aodh an Macaoimh Tóinleasg (died 1177) was a 12th-century ruler of Tulach Óc and Tír Eogain. He was the first of his family to play a significant role in the high politics of northern Ireland, following the death of the Muirchertach Mac Lochlainn king of Tír Eogain and high king of Ireland.

With the help of Donnchad Ua Cerbaill, king of Airgíalla, Áed was able to become king of Tír Eogain himself, though for much of the time he was forced to share the position with a Meic Lochlainn. Áed secured his hold on kingship partly by submitting to the Connacht high king Ruaidrí Ua Conchobair. As one of the latter's chief vassals, he was involved in the early stages of resistance to the Anglo-Norman invasion of Ireland.

== Early years ==
Áed is alleged to have been the son of a noble named Muirchertach, claimed in the 13th century to be a member of the Ua Néill family, who disappeared in the late 11th century. Áed is said to have been fostered among the Uí Thuirtre kindred, an Airgíallan group to the north of Lough Neagh. The 16th-century Leabhar Eoghanach said that he was fostered by the Ua Flainn (O'Lynn) chief of Uí Thuirtre, but there are signs that it may have been with the Ua hUrthuile (O'Hurley), a more junior Uí Thuirtre nobleman.

In 1160, his father Muirchertach was killed at the battle of Magh Lughad, allegedly struck down "innocently" [Annals of Ulster] by Lochlann Mac Lochlainn, kinsman of the king of Tir Eogain and high king of Ireland Muirchertach Mac Lochlainn. Lochlann Mac Lochlann was putting down a rebellion by Domnall Ua Gairmledaigh (O'Gormely) and the Cenél Móen (or Cineál Múáin), a group living to the south of modern Strabane. It was in revenge for this that a son of the slain Muirchertach—either Áed himself or a brother—killed Lochlann Mac Lochlainn.

The aftermath of this killing is unclear, but in 1166 following the blinding of the Ulaid king Eochaid Mac Duinn Sléibe, the Mac Lochlainn had to contend with rebellion from Airgíalla, Breifne, and even southern Tír Eogain. Muirchertach Mac Lochlainn was abandoned by most of his men, and killed. According to Mac Carthaigh's Book the foster father of the blinded Eochaid and architect of Muirchertach's destruction, the king of Airgíalla Donnchad Ua Cerbaill, proceeded to Magh Iomchláir near Dungannon and Áed was proclaimed king of Tír Eogain.

== Kingship ==
Áed, or his descendants, claim he was the senior representative of the Uí Néill of Tír Eogain, a kin-group claiming descent from 10th-century high-king Niall Glúndub. For more than a century the Uí Néill of Tír Eogain had been eclipsed by the Meic Lochlainn kin-group centred on Inishowen; the latter claimed descent from Domnall Dabaill, Niall's brother (sharing Áed Findliath as father), and thus were relatives. The dominance of the Meic Lochlainn group from 1053 to 1166 saw the Uí Néill disappear from the sources, and even the Uí Néill centre of Tulach Óc was lost to them. Indeed, Uí Briain dynasts are recorded holding the kingship of Tulach Óc in the late 1070s, perhaps as a result of Meic Lochlainn efforts to sever Uí Néill ties there. After the 1080s the family disappeared, resulting in uncertainty among Irish academics as to Áed's actual origins. It is uncertain what point he, or his descendants, assumed the dormant surname Ó Neill, or what right they had to do so.

The process of overturning Meic Lochlainn dominance in Tír Eogain was begun by Áed, something encapsulated by his traditional nickname in Macáem Tóinlesc, "the lazy-rumped lad". The 16th-century Leabhar Eoghanach claimed he had gained this appellation by refusing to stand in the presence of Muirchertach, the Meic Lochlainn high king, when the latter visited Áed's foster-father.

After proclaiming himself king, Áed though still had to defeat Muirchertach's sons, including the heir Niall Mac Lochlainn. In 1167 the new high king, the king of Connacht Ruaidrí Ua Conchobair, marched into Tír Eogain and divided the kingdom, with Niall getting the land north of Slieve Gallion and Áed the remainder. Both "half kings" [Simms] handed Ruaidrí hostages; and accompanied by the abbot of Derry, in the following year both men visited Ruaidrí at Athlone and received gifts.

From 1169 the Anglo-Normans began invading Ireland, undermining Ruaidrí's control of much of his territory. According to the Chanson de Dermot et du Comte ("Song of Dermot and the Earl"), in 1174 Áed brought a 3000-strong contingent to Ruaidrí's siege of Trim (held by Hugh de Lacy). The details are unclear, but Mac Carthaigh's Book related that in 1171 Áed was ruler of Tír Eogain and all Ulster. Nevertheless, in the 1170s Niall (died 1176) and his brothers Conchobar (died 1170) and Máel Sechlainn (died 1185) are all recorded claiming the kingship of Tír Eogain in succession. Áed probably held the kingship himself from 1170 to at least 1174, but had lost the position by his death.

Áed was killed by Máel Sechlainn Mac Lochlainn in 1177. Recording Áed's death, the Annals of Ulster noted that Áed was "king of Cenel-Eogain for a time and royal heir of all Ireland". In the year of his death the Anglo-Norman John de Courcy was conquering much of Ulster east of the River Bann. After two decades of upheaval, Áed's son Áed Méith was able to become king of Tír Eogain and rule for three decades.
