= Battle of Belahoe =

- Part of the Tudor conquest of Ireland
Date	1539
Location	Belahoe, County Meath, Ireland
Result	English victory

Belligerents
Kingdom of England	Kingdom of Tyrone; Kingdom of Tyrconnell

Commanders and leaders
Leonard Grey; Gerald Aylmer	Conn O'Neill; Manus O'Donnell

The Battle of Belahoe or Ballyhoe (Irish: Béal Átha hÓ) was fought in 1539 between the O'Neills and O'Donnells against English forces, in which the O'Neills and O'Donnells were defeated.

The battle occurred while the Lord Deputy of Ireland, Leonard Grey, was mounting an armed tour around Ireland to secure the submission of the allies of the Fitzgeralds of Kildare, who had recently been in rebellion against the Crown. While Grey was in the south at Cork, a raid was undertaken into Meath by the Fitzgeralds' allies, O'Neills, led by Conn O'Neill, and the O'Donnells, led by Manus O'Donnell into the English Pale, around Dublin. They destroyed and looted the towns of Ardee and Navan, before English forces in the Pale could be mobilised. However, the Lord Deputy of Ireland, Leonard Grey, returned with a force of about 800 men to oppose them. The O'Neills and O'Donnells were returning to their territories with treasure and spoils when the English overtook them at the Ford of Belahoe, four and a half miles south of Carrickmacross, on the boundary of the modern counties of Meath and Monaghan. The forces of the O'Neills and O'Donnells were quickly overwhelmed and fled in disarray, leaving their treasure and spoils in the hands of the Lord Deputy of Ireland. His subordinate commander Gerald Aylmer, later Lord Chief Justice of Ireland, was knighted in the field for his part in the victory.
