= Art Oge O'Neill =

Member of the O'Neill Dynasty of Tír Eoghain, Ulster

Art Oge O'Neill (Irish: Art Óg Ó Néill) was a member of the O'Neill Dynasty of Tyrone, Ulster, in medieval Ireland during the early Tudor era. In 1513 he became head of the O'Neills, holding the position until 1519 when he was succeeded by his half-brother.

Art Oge was the son of Conn Mor O'Neill and his first wife who was from the O'Cahan family. Conn More was the ruler of Tyrone, an area considerably larger than the modern County Tyrone, Northern Ireland. Art Oge's election in 1513 relied on the support of the powerful Anglo-Irish lord Gerald FitzGerald, 8th Earl of Kildare, whose sister had become his father's second wife. The crucial backing from Kildare was a sign of the growing influence of the Crown in Gaelic Irish society. Art Oge's successor, his brother Conn, later made this position a more formal one when he took the title of Earl of Tyrone as part of the surrender and regrant policy.

== Bibliography ==
- Ellis, Steven G. Ireland in the Age of the Tudors, 1447-1603. Longman, 1998.
- Casway, Jerrold. Owen Roe O'Neill and the Struggle for Catholic Ireland. University of Pennsylvania Press, 1984.
