= Conn O'Neill, 1st Earl of Tyrone =

Irish lord (1484 – 1559)

Conn Bacagh O'Neill Conn Bacach mac Cuinn Ó Néill
- 1st Earl of Tyrone
- Born: c. 1484; Ireland
- Died: July 1559 (aged about 79); Leinster, Ireland
- Issue: Matthew O'Neill; Shane O'Neill; Phelim Caoch O'Neill
- Parents: Conn Mór O'Neill; Eleanor Fitzgerald
- Occupation: Politician, soldier

Conn Bacagh O'Neill, 1st Earl of Tyrone (Irish: Conn Bacach mac Cuinn Ó Néill; c. 1484 – July 1559) was an Irish lord who ruled over Tyrone from 1519 to 1558. In 1541 O'Neill travelled to England to submit to Henry VIII as part of the surrender and regrant policy that coincided with the creation of the Kingdom of Ireland. He was made Earl of Tyrone, but his plans to pass the title and lands on to a chosen successor Matthew were thwarted by a violent succession dispute that led to another son, Shane O'Neill, emerging triumphant.

His grandson Hugh O'Neill eventually succeeded him as Earl and became head of the O'Neill of Tyrone dynasty. Hugh continued his grandfather's alliance with the Crown until his eventual leadership of Tyrone's Rebellion and later Flight of the Earls led to the collapse of the power of the traditional Irish lords in Ulster.

Conn's epithet of bacagh (Irish: bacach) meant "the lame".

== Biography ==
Conn Bacach O'Neill was the son of Conn Mór O'Neill, king of Tyrone, and Lady Eleanor Fitzgerald. Con Mor O'Neill was the son of Henry O'Neill, king of Tyrone. Lady Eleanor Fitzgerald was the daughter of Thomas FitzGerald, 7th Earl of Kildare. Conn Mór O'Neill was murdered in 1493 by his younger brother, Henry Óg O'Neill. Conn Bacach killed his uncle, Henry Óg, 21 July 1498.

== Becoming The O'Neill ==
In 1519, Conn Bacach succeeded his half-brother, Art Oge O'Neill, as chief of the Tír Eoghain branch of the O'Neill's (Cenél nEógain). The English referred to these O'Neill's as "O'Neill Mor" to differentiate them from the ruler of the O'Neill's of Clandeboye who was styled "O'Neill Boy". When his kinsman, the Earl of Kildare became viceroy in 1524, O'Neill consented to act as his swordbearer in ceremonies of state; but his allegiance was a personal matter, and while ready enough to give verbal assurances of loyalty, he could not be persuaded to readily give hostages to later lord Deputies as security for his conduct.

== Threat of excommunication ==
By 1534, several excommunications had been pronounced against Conn by the archbishop of Armagh. That year diverse followers of Conn raided the archepiscopal manor in Armagh, inflicting harm on its custodian, Senekin McDugan, with Conn ordering the revenues to be paid to the excommunicated clergyman John O'Corr and his brethren. Conn had previously been invoked by the primate as the secular arm in ensuring that no harm came to Senekin McDugan amongst other items, with excommunication and interdict amongst the results of failing to.

A letter dated 16 February remarking on the events has the archbishop given Conn six days to have the "delinquents" reconcile and make satisfaction for the harm they have done otherwise he be likewise declared excommunicated for the six days following and all places he betook to placed under interdict until the archbishop ordered otherwise.

== Invasion and submission ==
With the attainder of the Earl of Kildare and following rebellion, Conn sided with his in-laws the FitzGeralds. An alliance referred to as the Geraldine League sought the restoration of the heir of the FitzGerald lordship without interference from King Henry VIII of England. That rebellion was stoked by the idea of casting off England's Protestant church in Ireland. In 1539 Conn Bacagh and Manus O'Donnell attacked The Pale. They were returning to their territories with treasure and spoils when Lord Deputy Leonard Grey overtook them at the Ford of Belahoe, south of Carrickmacross. The O'Neills and O'Donnells were quickly overwhelmed and suffered 400 casualties before fleeing in disarray and leaving their treasure and spoil.

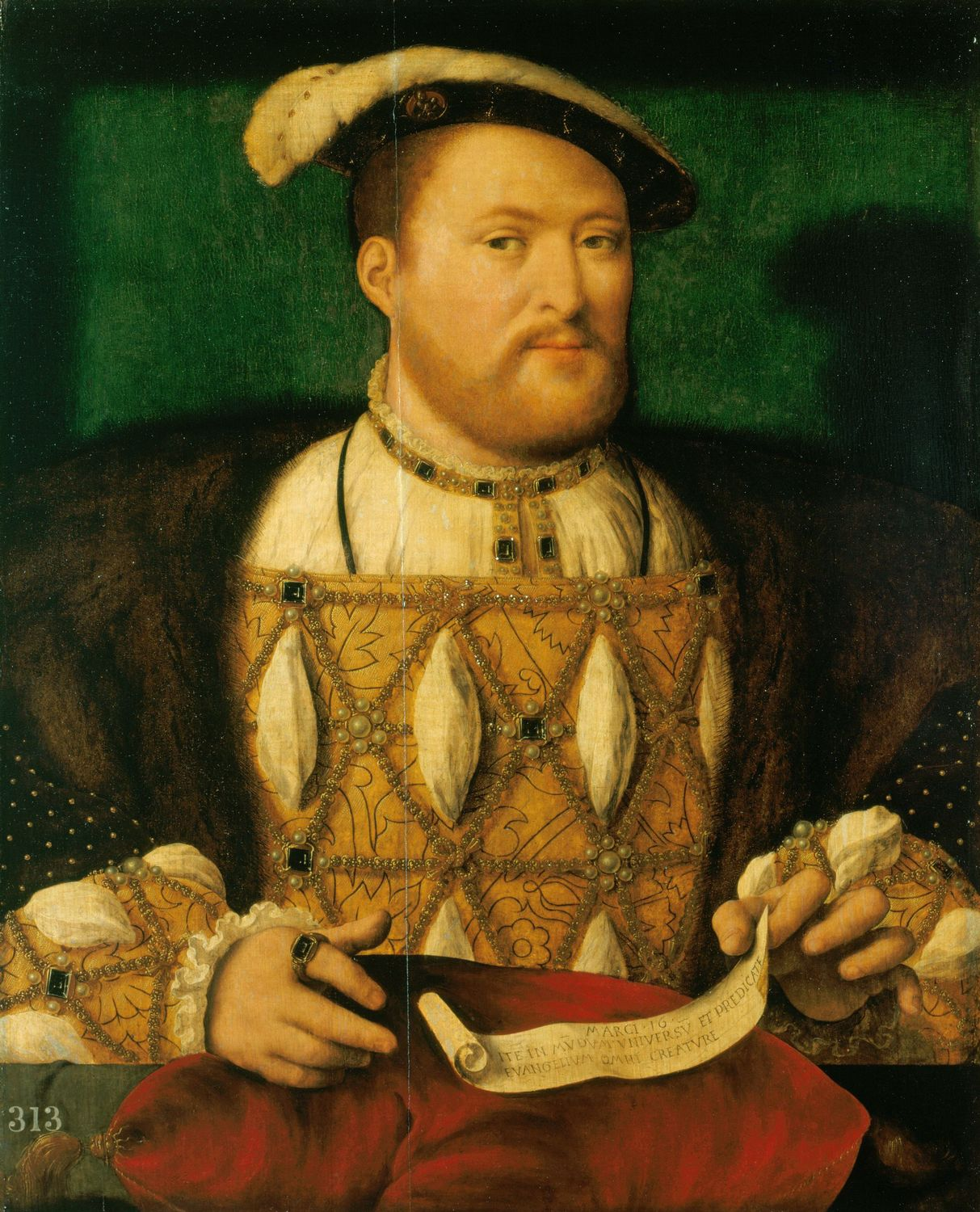
O'Neill travelled to London to submit to Henry VIII the newly established King of Ireland. This was part of a major policy of surrender and regrant in which Gaelic lords formally acknowledged the Crown's authority.

After Tyrone was invaded in 1541 by Sir Anthony St Leger, the lord deputy, Conn and the Geraldine League were defeated and he made his submission. Conn delivered up his son Phelim Caoch O'Neill as a hostage. In early 1542, Phelim was killed with one cast of a javelin by MacDonnell gallowglass according to the entry recording his death in the Annals of the Four Masters of Ireland., just prior to his father's submission to Henry VIII.

Conn attended a parliament held at Trim, and, crossing to England, became a Protestant, and made his submission at Greenwich to Henry VIII. Henry created him earl of Tyrone for life, and presented him with money and a valuable gold chain. He was also made a privy councillor in Ireland, and received a grant of lands within the Pale called Balgriffin.

== Civil war ==
The appointment of his allegedly illegitimate son, Ferdoragh (Matthew), as Baron of Dungannon and as such his hereditary successor, caused deep resentment among the rest of his sons. Of these, it was Shane, Conn's eldest surviving son, who was most favoured by the Irish custom of tanistry to succeed and so he went to war with his brother eventually having Ferdoragh killed in 1558. Conn Bacagh would die a year later, in July 1559. The next heir according to English succession was Ferdoragh's son Brian, however, he was killed by his kinsman Turlough Lynagh O'Neill in 1562. After Brian's death, the English administration took Ferdoragh's last surviving heir, Hugh O'Neill, into custody to protect him. Shane, now O'Neill, had sought to be created Earl of Tyrone, however this was refused and the McDonnells killed him in 1567.

== Marriage and children ==
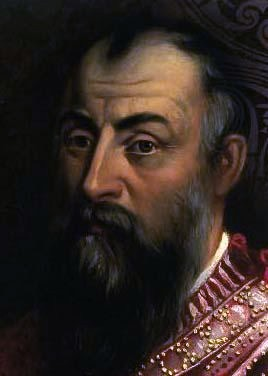
Conn's grandson Hugh O'Neill, Earl of Tyrone.

Conn was twice married and had numerous sons. His first wife was Lady Alice Fitzgerald, daughter of Gerald FitzGerald, 8th Earl of Kildare and Conn's first cousin. Their son was Phelim Caoch O'Neill. "Caoch" was the nickname for someone with poor eyesight or "the blind".

His second wife was Sorcha O'Neill, daughter of Hugh Oge O'Neill, chief of the O'Neills of Clandeboye. Sources differ in regards to the mother of Shane. Some stating he was the son of Conn and Sorcha and some stating he was from Conn and Lady Alice Fitzgerald.

Conn claimed an illegitimate son named Matthew or Ferdocha "the dark one" with Allison Kelly, the widowed wife of a blacksmith in Dundalk. Parenting aside, it was this Matthew that Conn designated as his heir to the English titles. He became the Baron of Dungannon when Conn became the Earl of Tyrone. This act caused great angst within the O'Neill clan and eventually led to civil war and the death of Matthew at the instigation of his half-brother Shane. As well an illegitimate daughter of Conn married the celebrated Sorley Boy MacDonnell, the man who eventually took part in the death of Shane O'Neill himself. His family spread throughout Ireland, Scotland, Europe and the New World during the downfall of the Gaelic Order, and today there are numerous families with a direct descent from Conn.

Preceded by Art Og mac Cuinn	King of Tír Eógain; 1519–after 17 July 1559	Succeeded by Shane O'Neill
Peerage of Ireland
New creation	Earl of Tyrone; 1542–1556	Vacant Title next held by Hugh O'Neill
