= Phelim Caoch O'Neill =

Phelim Caoch O'Neill (Irish: Feidhlimidh Caoch Ó Néill, 1517-1542) was a prince of the Cenél nEógain.

The eldest son of King Conn Bacach O'Neill. The then O'Neill, Conn's dynasty held lordship over significant parts of Ulster. Phelim's mother, Lady Alice Fitzgerald, was a daughter of Gerald FitzGerald, 8th Earl of Kildare. Phelim's father and maternal grandfather were among the most powerful men in Ireland in early sixteenth-century Ireland.

== Early life ==
Phelim Caoch (the blind) was a son of Conn Bacach, then The O'Neill, lord of Tyrone. Phelim was raised in the Gaelic fashion at his father's principal residence, his castle at Dungannon, County Tyrone, and was groomed as his father's taniste to one day succeed as lord of Tyrone himself. At the time of his birth, his uncle was The O'Neill, but in 1519, Phelim's father Conn Bacach assumed the title, which was the senior position among the three major O'Neill dynasties: Tyrone, the Fews, and Clanaboy. The O'Neill was traditionally the provincial king of Ulster, with traditional authority over the subservient kings (known as uirríthe in Irish) of the province. Phelim grew up learning the diplomacy and art of rule and war in Ulster. He took part in activities of his father's kingdom, including a stint as a hostage to the English just before his death. A part of Irish culture of that period was the custom of raiding. Raids against neighbouring lords for cattle was a primary past time for young noblemen. Especially in Ulster, cattle was main element of wealth. Thus the outcome of a raid weakened or promoted a junior Lord in the sixteenth century Ireland.

== Later life ==
Phelim was married to Honora O'Neill, daughter of Phelim O'Neill of Edenduffcarrick in Clanaboy. They had a son named Tirlough Brassileagh O'Neill. He gained his nickname from fosterage on the Clan Brassill in southern Ulster.

== Events surrounding his death ==
It was a longstanding vendetta with the lord of one of his fathers MacDonnell Galloglass septs that cost him his life. In early 1542 "The son of Ó Néill (Phelim Caoch, son of Conn, son of Conn) was killed with one cast of a javelin by MacDonnell Gallowglagh" according to the entry recording his death in the Annals of the Four Masters of Ireland. He had been killed after a longstanding quarrel with his father's principal Galloglass commander Gillespic MacDonnell. Phelim Caoch was assassinated in the months just prior to his father's submission to King Henry VIII.

== Consequences ==
One is left to wonder what might have happened had Phelim Caoch lived. After his death, Conn Bacach had no nominated taniste and capriciously passed over the interests of his son Shane, a boy of only six or seven years old, by favoring a sixteen-year-old affiliated adoptee named Mathew Kelly, (known in Irish as 'Feardorcha') the son of Alison Kelly (né, Roth), his current mistress. Conn's decision to take Mathew Kelly when he travelled to London to be created Earl of Tyrone would be the source of a sixty-year feud within the O'Neill dynasty when Mathew was made Baron of Dungannon and nominated as Conn's successor in English law, setting aside the superior claims of his sons, Conn Óg, Shane and Tirlough.

After Phelim Caoch's assassination Gillespic MacDonnell's galloglass sept became committed the adherents of Mathew (Feardorcha) and his descendants, and consistent supporters of English policy.

== Sources ==
- Annals of the Four Masters, a.d. 1542
- O'Neill, the Ancient and Royal Family
