= Battle of Down =

Date	14 May 1260
Location	near Downpatrick, County Down, Ireland
Result	Anglo-Irish victory

Belligerents
Kingdom of Tyrone; Kingdom of Tyrconnell; Kingdom of Connacht	Lordship of Ireland: Gaelic mercenaries

Commanders and leaders
Brian Chatha an Dúna Ua Néill †; Áedh mac Fedhlimidh Ua Conchobhair	Stephen Longespée

Strength
2,700	4,200

Casualties and losses
2,240; 100 captured	1,770

Location of Downpatrick in Ireland

The Battle of Down, also known as the battle of Drumderg (Irish: Druim Dearg) took place on or about 14 May 1260 near Downpatrick, in modern-day County Down, Northern Ireland. A Gaelic alliance led by Brian O'Neill (High-King of Ireland) and Hugh O'Connor were defeated by the English.

The forces of Brian O'Neill had been raiding the Anglo-Irish Earldom of Ulster after 1257 in an attempt to assert their independence and form a coalition of the Irish against the English. O'Neill allied with Hugh McPhelim O'Connor (Aedh mac Fedhlimidh Ua Conchobhair) of Connacht and together with their men went into battle against the Normans. According to the Annals of Innisfallen, the English had gathered an army of mostly Irish Gaelic levies to fight against the coalition, and the English themselves played only a small role in the fighting. Many of the Irish clans in Leinster, Ulster, Munster, Meath, and Breifne, which were mostly under English rule at the time, provided the English with the bulk of their fighting forces, serving as mercenaries and retained bands. Thus, most of the battles between the English and Irish at this time would have seemed more like battles between the Irish themselves. Brian O'Neill was defeated and killed together with a number of O'Cahan chiefs.

The Annals of Innisfallen state:

Brian Ua Neill, king of Cenél Eógain, to whom the Gaedil gave hostages, and who paid-neither tax nor tribute to the king of England, was slain by the Gaedil (Irish) themselves and by some of the foreigners (Anglo-Normans) {at Dún dá Lethglas}.

The Annals of Ulster state:

The battle of Druim-derg was fought (in a place which is called Dromma-derg) at Dun-da-leathglas by Brian Ua Neill and Aedh, son of Feidhlimidh Ua Conchobair, against the Foreigners of the North of Ireland, wherein were killed many of the nobles of the Gaidhil, namely, Brian Ua Neill and Domnall Ua Cairre and Diarmait Mag Lachlainn and Maghnus Ua Cathain and Cian Ua Inneirghi and Donnsleibhe Mag Cana and Concobur O'Duibhdirma and Aedh, his son, and Amlaim Ua Gairmleaghaidh and Cu-Uladh Ua hAnluain. But one notable thing happened: fifteen men of the nobles of Clann-Cathain were killed on that spot. There were killed of the Connachtmen there: Gilla-Crist, son of Conchobar, son of Cormac Ua Mailruanaigh and king of Magh Luirg and Cathal, son of Tighernan Ua Conchobair and Maelruanaidh, son of Donnchadh Ua Mailruanaigh and Cathal, son of Donnchadh, son of Muircertach and Aedh, son of Muircertach the Fair and Tadhg, son of Cathal, son of Brian Ua Mailruanaigh and Diarmait, son of Tadhg, son of Muiredhach, son of Tomaltach Ua Mailruanaigh and Conchobur Mac Gille-Arraigh and Tadhg, son of Cian Ua Gadhra and Gilla-Beraigh Ua Cuinn and many other persons.

== See also ==
- Battle of Áth an Chip
