= Niall Culanach O'Neill =

King of Tyrone

Niall Culanach O'Neill (Irish: Niall Cúlánach Ó Néill) (c. 1231–1291) was a king of Tyrone in medieval Ireland on three occasions between 1261 and 1291. His nickname Culánach, also anglicised as Culanagh, meant "of the long back hair".

The son of Donnell Og O'Neill, he wrested the kingship of Tyrone from his brother Hugh Boy O'Neill in 1261. That same year a battle took place between the Cenél Eógain led by O'Neill and the Cenél Conaill led by Donnell Og O'Donnell, which resulted in a resounding defeat for O'Neill with many chiefs killed or taken prisoner. At some point in 1262 Hugh Boy would expel Niall from the kingship. Possibly after this O'Neill seems to have become king of Inishowen, a sub-kingdom within Tyrone, and is styled as such in the 1270s.

In the early 1270s a feud erupted between the de Mandeville's and William FitzWarin, Seneschal of Ulster. Hugh Boy had taken the side of his de Mandeville friends and after burning five towns in the earldom, was routed by the seneschal. After this defeat, O'Neill saw an opportunity and offered his assistance to King Edward I in hunting down and destroying his brother, and claimed that Hugh Boy had protection from people within the Dublin administration. Despite this, Hugh Boy would receive a quick and lenient pardon for his part. The feud would continue until 1276 when the de Mandeville's were defeated.

Hugh Boy died in 1283 and his second-cousin Donnell O'Neill took the kingship. In 1286 Richard Óg de Burgh, 2nd Earl of Ulster, would depose Donnell and install Niall as king in his place. Donnell would retake the kingship by force in 1290 only for de Burgh to once again depose him in 1291 reinstalling Niall. That same year Donnell killed Niall, however before he could take the kingship Hugh Boy's son, Brian, had been installed by the outraged de Burgh.

Niall Culanach O'Neill O'Neill Dynasty Cadet branch of the Cenél nEógain Born: c. 1231 Died: 1291
Regnal titles
Preceded by Hugh Boy O'Neill	King of Ailech; 1st reign 1261-1262	Succeeded by Hugh Boy O'Neill
Preceded by Hugh Boy O'Neill	King of Tyrone; 1st reign 1261-1262	Succeeded by Hugh Boy O'Neill
Unknown	King of Inishowen; Possibly 1263-1286	Unknown
Preceded by Donnell O'Neill	King of Tyrone; 2nd reign 1286-1290	Succeeded by Donnell O'Neill
Preceded by Donnell O'Neill	King of Tyrone; 3rd reign 1291	Succeeded by Brian O'Neill
