= Aodh Méith =

13th century King of Tír Eoghain, Ireland

- King of Tír Eogain
- Reign: c. 1196–1230
- Predecessor: Muircheartach mac Muircheartaigh Ó Lochlainn
- Successor: Domhnall Óg
- Died: 1230
- Spouse: Bean-Midhe
- Issue: Domhnall Óg
- Middle Irish: Áed mac Áeda
- Early Modern Irish: Aodh mac Aodha, "Méith"
- Father: Aodh an Macaoimh Tóinleasg

Aodh Méith or Áed Méith (died 1230) was a 13th-century king of Tír Eoghain. The son of Aodh an Macaoimh Tóinleasg, Aodh spent much of his career fighting off threats from Fir Manach, Tír Conaill and Galloway, as well as John de Courcy and the Lordship of Ireland. His involvement in Irish Sea politics may have seen him sponsor a Mac Uilleim claim to the Scottish throne, but this is unclear.

Latterly the ally of Hugh de Lacy, Earl of Ulster, Aodh secured a stable relationship with the earldom of Ulster and lordship of Ireland, two Anglo-Norman polities that came into existence in Aodh's lifetime. By the end of his life, he was the supreme native Irish ruler in the north of the island, and passed succession onto his son Domhnall Óg (Domnall Óc). A literary biography devoted to Aodh was seemingly composed sometime in the Middle Ages, but it has not survived. He is the ancestor—though not the eponymous ancestor— of Clann Aodha Buidhe, the Clandeboy O'Neills.

== Background ==
Aodh Méith was the son of Aodh an Macaoimh Tóinleasg, himself briefly king of Tír Eoghain. Aodh an Macaoimh Tóinleasg had begun the process of overturning Ó Lochlainn dominance in Tír Eoghain. His traditional nickname An Macaoimh Tóinleasg or "the lazy-rumped lad", was earned, according to the 16th-century Leabhar Eoghanach, after he refused to stand in the presence of the high king Muircheartach Ó Lochlainn. The son's nickname, Méith, means "the fat".

Aodh an Macaoimh Tóinleasg was nonetheless killed by his rival, Muircheartach's son Maoilsheachlainn Ó Lochlainn (Máel Sechlainn Mac Lochlainn) in 1177. In the year of Aodh an Macaoimh Tóinleasg's death John de Courcy had begun the Anglo-Norman conquest of the Ulaidh (eastern Ulster). Between the death of Aodh an Macaoimh Tóinleasg in 1177 and the first appearance of Aodh Méith in 1199, Tír Eoghain was embroiled in the resultant political chaos.

The Annals of the Four Masters relate that in 1179 "the churches of Tír Eoghain, from the mountains south, were left desolate, in consequence of war and intestine commotion, famine and distress". And after Maoilsheachlainn Ó Lochlainn's death at the hands of the Normans in 1185, the Ó Lochlainn group struggled to retain power over Tír Eoghain in the face of internal disaffection, Norman invasion and the power of the king of Tír Conaill, Flaithbheartach Ó Maoldhoraidh (died 1197).

== Securing power ==
Aodh may have been king of Tír Eoghain since 1196, the year of his Ó Lochlainn predecessor's death. His first appearance in the sources records him leading five ships in an attack upon the English settlement of Larne, in 1199, while John de Courcy was distracted by a campaign in northern Tír Eoghain. In the same year he defeated an attempt by the Cineál Conaill to make the Ó hEignigh king of Fir Manach (and Airghíalla) their king, defeating and gaining the submission of both in separate encounters.

At this point, Aodh appears to be king both north and south of the Sperrins. Aodh married Ó hEignigh's daughter Bean-Midhe (died 1215), and it is possible that he did so as a result of his victory over the Fir Manach.

In 1200, Aodh led successful expeditions against the English colonists in Ulster. In 1201 Aodh led an expedition to Connacht to replace English-backed king Cathal Carrach Ó Conchobhair with the former king Cathal Croibhdhearg Ó Conchobhair. The hosting was met and defeated by William de Burgh: Aodh's father-in-law the Ó hEignigh was killed in the encounter while Aodh himself was forced to submit.

The Cineál Eoghain, the people of Tír Eoghain, subsequently deposed Aodh, with Conchobhar Beag ("the small") Ó Lochlainn taking his place as king. The latter was killed shortly afterwards by Éigneachán Ó Domhnaill (died 1207), first Ó Domhnaill king of Tír Conaill. After Aodh himself disposed of another Ó Lochlainn claimant, his position as ruler of the kingdom was regained—though it was not until 1208 or 1209 that Ó Domhnaill opposition was neutralised through a pact of friendship with Éigneachán's son and successor Domhnall Ó Domhnaill.

== The English and Gall-Gaidhil ==
Developments among the English in 1205 saw John de Courcy fall out of favour with John, King of England, with Ulster being assigned to Hugh de Lacy in his stead. John de Courcy took refuge among the Cineál Eoghain. Hugh de Lacy, now earl of Ulster, thus came north with an army in 1207 and invaded Tír Eoghain. The earl was unable to obtain anything decisive, and himself fell out of royal favour in 1210.

When King John laid siege to the earl's castle of Carrickfergus, Aodh brought his forces to assist the English monarch. He did not, however, enter John's presence because the latter was not prepared to give the hostages the Ó Néill needed to feel safe. The following year King John ordered John de Gray, Bishop of Norwich and Justiciar of Ireland, to subdue Aodh's province.

A series of castles were built, and much of what are now counties Antrim, Londonderry and Tyrone were granted to Ailean [Alan], Lord of Galloway (or "King of the Gall-Gaidhil"), his brother Tomás Mac Uchtraigh and their cousin Donnchadh of Carrick. Tomás built a castle at Coleraine and in 1212, accompanied by sons of Raghnall mac Somhairle, led a raid on the city of Derry with seventy-six ships. In 1214, this time accompanied by Ruaidhrí mac Raghnaill, Tomás attacked Derry again, sacking the city and looting the church.

Tomás's activities against Aodh may have been related to the activities of the MacUilleim [MacWilliam] branch of the Scottish royal dynasty. One of their number, Gofraidh mac Domhnaill, had come from Ireland to Ross in 1211 to claim the Scottish throne. There is some likelihood that Aodh was sponsoring their activities. Whatever gains were made by the Gall-Gaidhil, their position in Ireland was later undermined by de Lacy and the Bissets. It is probable that the Ó Lochlainn kindred and others suffered more than Ó Néill during these campaigns.

== Later career and legacy ==
Aodh may have submitted to the English king's authority in the 1210s, and certainly had done so by 1221; but when Hugh de Lacy began reclaiming his Ulster earldom in 1224, Aodh took up his cause against the English crown. As a government army tried to march into the north, Aodh's forces blocked them on the Fews of Armagh and subsequently the English crown (now held by Henry III) came to terms with them.

Aodh led armies into Connacht in 1225 and 1226 following the death of his former ally Cathal Croibhdhearg, but Aodh's own territory seems to have been left in peace for the remainder of his reign. He died in 1230, of natural causes. The Annals of Connacht recorded his death, styling him:

[D]efender of Leth Cuind Chetchathaig against the Galls and against Leth Moga Nuadat, a prince eligible de jure for the kingship of Ireland, died this year; a king who never gave pledge or hostage or tribute to Gall or Gael; a king who wrought slaughterings and great routs on the Galls; a king who was the support of any Gaels who were in banishment or homeless; a king who was the most generous and excellent of all the men of Ireland who ever lived.

In the face of Ó Lochlainn opposition, Aodh's son Domhnall Óg (died 1234) ruled for four years after his death. Following yet another decade of strife, Aodh's nephew Brian Ruadh once again established Ó Néill dominance in the province, a dominance that would last until the end of the kingdom in the 17th century.

Aodh Méith seems to have been the subject of panegyric biography, but unfortunately this is now lost. He is ancestor of Clann Aodha Buidhe, the Clandeboy O'Neills who took their name from Aodh's grandson Aodh Buidhe. After the 13th century Aodh Méith's (and Aodh Buidhe's) descendants are side-lined to territory later acquired east of the River Bann, with the Ó Néill of Tír Eoghain being drawn from the descendants of Aodh's uncle Niall Ruadh (through Niall Ruadh's son Brian).
