= Donnell Claragh O'Neill =

Donnell Claragh O'Neill (Irish: Domhnall Clarach Ó Néill, died 1509), was a member of the O'Neill Dynasty of Tír Eoghain, Ulster in medieval Ireland. He was the son of Con O'Neill, and a half-brother to Henry Oge O'Neill. He succeeded Henry as chief of the O'Neills, and ruled from 1498 to 1509. He was in turn succeeded by a cousin Art O'Neill.

As a sign of the growing influence of the English Crown in Gaelic society, Donnell's election as chief was dependent on the support of the Lord Deputy of Ireland, Gerald FitzGerald, 8th Earl of Kildare.

== Bibliography ==
- Ellis, Steven G. Ireland in the Age of the Tudors, 1447-1603. Longman, 1998.
