= Ballyroney Castle =

Former castle in County Down, Northern Ireland

Coordinates: 54.2820°N 6.1300°W

Ballyroney Castle was a castle situated at Ballyroney, County Down, Northern Ireland. Originally constructed sometime in the 12th century as a motte and bailey castle, it was rebuilt by Justiciar of Ireland, John FitzGeoffrey in 1248.
