= Cole (surname) =

Origin
- Meaning: "swarthy, coal-black, charcoal"
- Region of origin: England

Cole /koʊl/ is a surname of English origin, and is also now used as a given name. It is of Middle English origin, and its meaning is "swarthy, coal-black, charcoal".

It is also an Americanized spelling of the German name "Kohl", of the Dutch name "Kool", and of the Scottish and Irish name "McCool".

== People ==
=== A ===
- A. Cole, English cricketer
- Aaron Cole (born 1999), American hip-hop artist
- Aaron Cole (basketball) (born 1973), Australian basketball player
- Abdiah Cole (1610–1670), English physician
- Abner Cole (1783–1835), American newspaper editor
- Abraham Cole (1808–1890), American politician
- Ada Cole (1860–1930), English nurse
- Adam Cole (born 1989), American professional wrestler
- Adam Cole (cricketer) (born 1974), English cricketer
- Adrian Cole (disambiguation), multiple people
- Aivale Cole, New Zealand soprano
- A. J. Cole (born 1992), American baseball player
- A. J. Cole III (born 1995), American football player
- Al Cole (born 1964), American boxer
- Albert Cole (disambiguation), multiple people
- Alex Cole (born 1965), American baseball player
- Alfred Cole (disambiguation), multiple people
- Alhassan Cole (born 1955), Sierra Leonean politician
- Allan Cole (1943–2019), American author
- Allan Cole (footballer) (1950–2025), Jamaican footballer
- Alphaeus Philemon Cole (1876–1988), American artist
- Alyson Cole, American political scientist
- Alyssa Cole (born 1982), American author
- Andrea Cole, Canadian Paralympic swimmer
- Andrew Cole (disambiguation), multiple people
- Andy Cole (born 1971), English footballer
- Ann Cole (1934–1986), American singer
- Anna Russell Cole (1846–1926), American philanthropist
- Anthony Cole (disambiguation), multiple people
- Archie Cole (1900–1952), American baseball player
- Arthur Cole (disambiguation), multiple people
- Ashley Cole (born 1980), English footballer
- Ashling Cole, American singer

=== B ===
- Babette Cole (1950–2017), English writer
- Barbara Cole (born 1955), Canadian curator
- Barry Cole (1936–2014), English poet
- Beccy Cole (born 1972), Australian singer-songwriter
- Belle Cole (1853–1905), American contralto
- Benjamin Cole (disambiguation), multiple people
- Bert Cole (1896–1975), American baseball player
- Bessie Olive Cole (1883–1971), American pharmacist
- Bill Cole (disambiguation), multiple people
- Billy Cole (born 1965), British athlete
- Billy Cole (footballer) (1909–1958), Australian rules footballer
- Bindi Cole (born 1975), Australian photographer
- Bob Cole (disambiguation), multiple people
- Bradley Cole (born 1959), American actor
- Brendan Cole (born 1976), New Zealand ballroom dancer
- Brendan Cole (sprinter) (born 1981), Australian hurdler
- Brian Cole (disambiguation), multiple people
- B. J. Cole (born 1946), English guitarist
- Briony Cole (born 1983), Australian diver
- Brock Cole (born 1938), American illustrator
- Bruce Cole (1938–2018), American public policy analyst
- Buddy Cole (musician) (1916–1964), American pianist

=== C ===
- Cade Cole (born 1983), American attorney
- Cam Cole (born 1953), Canadian journalist
- Carlton Cole (born 1983), English footballer
- Carole Cole (1944–2009), American actress
- Carolyn Cole (born 1961), American photographer
- Carroll Cole (1938–1985), American serial killer
- Casey Cole, American theologian
- Cash Cole (1891–1959), American politician
- Catherine Cole (born 1950), Australian author and academic
- Cecil Cole (1919–2002), American baseball player
- Cecilia Cole (1920–2006), Gambian politician
- Chanel Cole (born 1977), New Zealand musician
- Charles Cole (disambiguation), multiple people
- Charlie Cole (disambiguation), multiple people
- Cheryl Cole (born 1983), English singer
- Chester C. Cole (1824–1913), American judge
- Chloe Cole (born 2004/2005), American activist
- Chris Cole (disambiguation), multiple people
- Christian Cole, Sierra Leonean football coach
- Christian Cole (barrister) (1852–1885), Sierra Leonean barrister
- Christina Cole (born 1982), English actress
- Christopher Cole (disambiguation), multiple people
- Clara Gilbert Cole (1868–1956), English activist
- Clarence Alfred Cole (1909–1963), American bishop
- Clay Cole (1938–2010), American disc jockey
- Cody Cole (born 1990), New Zealand weightlifter
- Coleman Cole (1800–1886), American Indigenous politician
- Colin Cole (disambiguation), multiple people
- Cordelia Throop Cole (1833–1900), American social reformer
- Corinne Cole (born 1937), American model
- Corinne Alsop Cole (1886–1971), American politician
- Cornelius Cole (1822–1924), American politician
- Cozy Cole (1909–1981), American drummer
- Craig Cole (born 1975), American football player
- Cris Cole, British writer
- C. Vernon Cole (1922–2013), American scientist
- Cyrenus Cole (1863–1939), American politician and newspaper editor
- Cyrus W. Cole (1876–1952), American naval officer

=== D ===
- Daniel Cole (disambiguation), multiple people
- Dandridge MacFarlan Cole (1921–1965), American aerospace engineer
- Danton Cole (born 1967), American ice hockey player
- Dave Cole (baseball) (1930–2011), American baseball player
- Dave Cole (artist) (born 1975), American visual artist
- David Cole (disambiguation), multiple people
- Darrell S. Cole (1920–1945), American Marine
- Darren Cole (born 1992), Scottish footballer
- Dennis Cole (1940–2009), American actor
- Deon Cole (born 1972), American comedian
- Derham Cole (born 1977), American politician
- Des Cole (1933–2015), Australian rules footballer
- Desmond Cole (born 1982), Canadian journalist
- Devin Cole (born 1976), American mixed martial artist
- Donald Cole (disambiguation), multiple people
- Doris Cole (born 1938), American architect
- Doug Cole (1916–1959), English footballer
- Douglas Cole (disambiguation), multiple people
- Duncan Cole (1958–2014), New Zealand footballer
- Dylan Cole, American painter
- Dylan Cole (American football) (born 1994), American football player

=== E ===
- Earl Cole (born 1971), American entrepreneur
- Ed Cole (1909–1977), American automotive executive
- Ed Cole (baseball) (1909–1999), American baseball player
- Eddie Cole (disambiguation), multiple people
- Edith Cole (1870–1927), British actress
- Edith Cole (tennis) (1862–1945), English tennis player
- Edmund William Cole (1827–1899), American businessman
- Edna Sarah Cole (1855–1950), American missionary
- Edward Cole (disambiguation), multiple people
- Edward Irham Cole (1857–1942), Australian theatrical entrepreneur and film director
- Edwin Cole (disambiguation), multiple people
- Elaine Cole, Canadian television personality
- Eli K. Cole (1867–1929), American commanding officer
- Ellie Cole (born 1991), Australian Paralympic swimmer
- Elsie Vera Cole (1885–1967), English painter
- Emerson Cole (1927–2019), American football player
- Emma Cole (2016–2019), American murder victim
- Emma Cole (1845–1910), American teacher
- Emmanuel Cole (1908–1972), Sierra Leonean soldier
- Emory Cole (1893–1968), American lawyer
- E. Nelson Cole (born 1937), American politician
- Eric Cole (disambiguation), multiple people
- Erik Cole (born 1978), American ice hockey player
- Ernest Cole (disambiguation), multiple people
- Eunice Cole (1590–1680), American witch
- Evan Cole (born 1961), American entrepreneur
- Evan Alex Cole (born 1985), American actor
- Everett B. Cole (1910–2001), American writer
- Ezra Danolds Cole (1902–1992), American stamp dealer

=== F ===
- Fay-Cooper Cole (1881–1961), American anthropologist
- Felix Cole (1887–1969), American diplomat
- Femi Claudius Cole (born 1962), Sierra Leonean politician
- Finn Cole (born 1995), English actor
- Francis Cole (1872–1959), English zoologist
- Frank Cole (disambiguation), multiple people
- Fred Cole (disambiguation), multiple people
- Freddy Cole (1931–2020), American musician
- Frederick Cole (cricketer) (1852–1941), English cricketer
- Fremont Cole (1856–1915), American politician

=== G ===
- Gabriel Cole (disambiguation), multiple people
- Galbraith Lowry Cole (1772–1842), British army officer
- Galbraith Lowry Egerton Cole (1881–1929), Irish pioneer
- Galen Cole (1925–2020), American philanthropist
- Galusha Marion Cole (1826–1931), American music instructor
- Gamba Cole, British actor
- Gardner Cole, American songwriter
- Gary Cole (born 1956), American actor
- Gary Cole (footballer) (born 1956), Australian footballer
- G. D. H. Cole (1889–1959), English political theorist
- G. Emerson Cole (1919–2002), American radio announcer
- Gene Cole (1928–2018), American athlete
- George Cole (disambiguation), multiple people
- Gerrit Cole (born 1990), American baseball player
- Gina Cole (born 1960), New Zealand writer
- G. Marcus Cole, American law professor
- Goody Cole (1590–1680), American witch
- Gordon E. Cole (1833–1890), American lawyer and politician
- Gracie Cole (1924–2006), English trumpeter
- Graham Cole (born 1952), British actor
- Grenville Cole (1859–1924), English geologist

=== H ===
- Hal Cole (1912–1970), American race car driver
- Hallam Cole (1874–1932), Barbadian cricketer
- Harold Cole (1906–1946), British soldier
- Harriette Cole (born 1961), American author
- Harry Cole (disambiguation), multiple people
- Hector Cole (1902–1981), New Zealand rugby league footballer
- Helen Cole (1922–2004), American politician
- Henri Cole (born 1956), American poet
- Henry Cole (disambiguation), multiple people
- Holly Cole (born 1963), Canadian singer
- Horace de Vere Cole (1881–1936), British comedian
- Howard Cole (disambiguation), multiple people
- Hugh M. Cole (1911–2005), American army officer
- Hugo Cole (1917–1995), English music critic
- Humfray Cole (1530–1591), English engraver
- Hunter Cole (born 1971), American artist

=== I ===
- Ian Cole (disambiguation), multiple people
- Ike Cole (1927–2001), American pianist
- Ingrid Cole, American actor
- Irma Schoennauer Cole (1920–2003), American swimmer
- Isaac Cole (1886–1940), English rugby league footballer
- Israel Cole (born 1964), Sierra Leonean boxer

=== J ===
- J. Cole (born 1985), American hip hop recording artist
- Jack Cole (disambiguation), multiple people
- Jacqui Cole, British molecular engineer
- Jade Cole (born 1979), American model
- Jake Cole (born 1985), English footballer
- James Cole (disambiguation), multiple people
- Janelle Cole (born 1996), American cyclist
- Janice Cole, American attorney
- Janis Cole (born 1954), Canadian filmmaker
- Jared Cole, Australian physicist
- Jarred Cole (born 2000), English darts player
- Jean Cole (1926–2015), American reporter
- Jeffrey Cole, American anthropologist
- Jeffrey I. Cole, American professor
- Jennifer S. Cole, American linguistics professor
- Jeremy Cole (born 1941), Zimbabwean sports shooter
- Jerry Cole (1939–2008), American guitarist
- Joanna Cole (disambiguation), multiple people
- Joanne Cole (1934–1985), British artist
- John Cole (disambiguation), multiple people
- Johnnetta Cole (born 1936), American anthropologist
- Johnnie Cole, American football player and coach
- Jon Cole (disambiguation), multiple people
- Jonathan Cole (disambiguation), multiple people
- Joseph Cole (disambiguation), multiple people
- Joshua Cole (disambiguation), multiple people
- Juan Cole (born 1952), American historian
- Jude Cole (born 1960), American singer–songwriter
- Julian Cole (1925–1999), American mathematician
- Julie Dawn Cole (born 1957), British actress
- June Cole (1903–1960), American bassist
- Justin Cole (born 1987), American football player
- J. W. Cole (1927–2014), American football coach

=== K ===
- Kat Cole (born 1978), American businesswoman
- Kate Cole (born 1978), Australian actress
- Kate Cole (engineer), Australian engineer
- Katherine Cole, American journalist
- Kathleen Margaret Cole (1924–2003), Canadian phycologist
- Katie Cole, Australian singer-songwriter
- Keelan Cole (born 1993), American football player
- Keith Cole (performance artist), Canadian performance artist
- Kenneth Cole (disambiguation), multiple people
- Kevin Cole (born 1960), American artist
- Keyshia Cole (born 1981), American singer–songwriter
- Kimberly Cole (born 1987), American singer-songwriter
- King Cole (disambiguation), multiple people
- Kresley Cole, American author
- Kyla Cole (born 1978), Slovak model

=== L ===
- Lanisha Cole (born 1982), American model
- Larnell Cole (born 1993), English footballer
- Larry Cole (born 1946), American football player
- L. B. Cole (1918–1995), American comic book artist
- L. C. Cole (born 1956), American football player
- Leah Cole, American politician
- Leander C. Cole (1849–1933), American politician
- Lee Cole (field hockey) (born 1995), Irish field hockey player
- Lee Cole (writer), American writer
- Leon Cole (1939–2019), Canadian musician
- Leon Jacob Cole (1877–1948), American ornithologist
- Leonard A. Cole (1933–2022), American political scientist
- Leslie Cole (disambiguation), multiple people
- Lester Cole (1904–1985), American screenwriter
- Lilian Cole (born 1985), Nigerian footballer
- Lily Cole (born 1988), English model
- Lionel Cole, American pianist
- Lior Cole (born 2001), American fashion model
- Lincoln P. Cole (1918–1999), American politician
- Linzy Cole (1948–2016), American football player
- Lisa Cole (born 1973), American soccer coach
- Liz Cole, English lawn bowler
- Lloyd Cole (born 1961), English singer–songwriter
- Lo Cole, British illustrator
- Lois Dwight Cole (1903–1979), American editor and author
- Loran Kenstley Cole (born 1966), American convicted murderer
- Lorenza Jordan Cole (1897–1994), American musician
- Lori Ann Cole, American video game designer
- Lorraine Cole (born 1967), English badminton player
- Louis Cole (disambiguation), multiple people
- Louise Cole (born 1974), Irish sailor
- Lowry Cole, 4th Earl of Enniskillen (1845–1924), Irish politician
- Luke Cole (1962–2009), American lawyer
- Luke Cole (rugby union) (born 1993), English rugby union footballer
- Luther Cole (disambiguation), multiple people
- Lynnette Cole (born 1978), American model

=== M ===
- Mabel Cook Cole (1880–1977), American dancer
- Marcus Cole (musician) (born 1971), American musician
- Margaret Cole (1893–1980), English novelist and politician
- Margaret Buchanan Cole (1885–1959), American mathematician
- Margie Cole, American bridge player
- Marguerite Cole (1897–1987), American volunteer
- Maria Cole (1922–2012), American singer
- Marion Cole (1924–2011), American pilot
- Marjorie Kowalski Cole (1953–2009), American poet
- Mark Cole (born 1958), American politician
- Martin Cole (disambiguation), multiple people
- Martina Cole (born 1959), English novelist
- Marverine Cole, British television presenter
- Marvin Frederick Cole (1922–2005), American judge
- Mason Cole (born 1996), American football player
- Matilda Cole, English musician
- Matt Cole (born 1996), American football player
- Maurice Cole (disambiguation), multiple people
- Max Cole (disambiguation), multiple people
- Mel D. Cole (born 1976), American photographer
- Melanie Cole (born 1968), Canadian ice dancer
- Michael Cole (disambiguation), multiple people
- Michal Cole (born 1974), Israeli artist
- Mitch Cole, American basketball coach
- Mitchell Cole (1985–2012), English footballer
- M. J. Cole (born 1973), British musician
- Monica Cole (1922–1994), English geographer
- Myke Cole (born 1973), American author
- Myles Cole (born 2000), American football player
- Myrtle Cole (born 1966), American politician

=== N ===
- Nancy Cole (psychologist), American psychologist
- Nancy Cole (mathematician) (1902–1991), American mathematician
- Nat King Cole (1917–1965), American singer and pianist
- Natalie Cole (1950–2015), American singer
- Natalie Robinson Cole (1901–1984), American educator and author
- Nathan Cole (1825–1904), American politician
- Nathan Cole Jr. (1860–1921), American newspaper founder
- Ned Cole (1917–2002), American bishop
- Neil Cole (disambiguation), multiple people
- Neville Cole (1952–2009), Irish boxer
- Nicholas Cole (disambiguation), multiple people
- Nick Cole (born 1984), American football player
- Nicole Cole, American politician
- Nigel Cole (born 1959), English film director
- Norma Cole (born 1945), Canadian poet
- Norman Cole (disambiguation), multiple people
- Norris Cole (born 1988), American basketball player

=== O ===
- Olivia Cole (1942–2018), American actress
- Olivia Cole (poet) (born 1981), British poet
- Orlando Cole (1908–2010), American cellist
- Orsamus Cole (1819–1903), American lawyer and judge
- Owen Cole (born 2004), American cyclist

=== P ===
- Paddy Cole (1939–2025), Irish singer
- Pam Cole (born 1967), American graphic designer and politician
- Patrick Cole (born 1993), American basketball player
- Paul Cole (born 1941), British racehorse trainer
- Paula Cole (born 1968), American singer–songwriter
- Pete Cole (1916–1971), American football player
- Peter Cole (disambiguation), multiple people
- Philip Cole, American pharmacologist
- Pinky Cole (born 1987), Jamaican-American restaurateur
- Phoebe Cole (1955–2017), American artist
- Preston Cole, American politician

=== Q ===
- Qwynnterrio Cole (born 1999), American football player

=== R ===
- Ralph Cole (disambiguation), multiple people
- Randall Cole, Canadian film director
- Raquel Cole (born 1993), Canadian singer
- R. Beverly Cole (1829–1901), American physician
- R. Clint Cole (1870–1957), American politician
- Rebecca Cole (disambiguation), multiple people
- Rebel A. Cole (born 1958), American finance professor
- Reece Cole (born 1998), English footballer
- Reginald Berkeley Cole (1882–1925), British colonist
- Reggie Cole, West Indian cricket umpire
- Renee Cole (born 1971), American beauty pageant contestant
- Rex Vicat Cole (1870–1940), British artist
- R. Guy Cole Jr. (born 1951), American judge
- Richard Cole (disambiguation), multiple people
- Rick Cole (born 1953), American politician
- R. J. Cole (born 1999), American basketball player
- Robert Cole (disambiguation), multiple people
- Robin Cole (born 1955), American football player
- Roger Cole, Irish politician
- Ron Cole, American domestic terrorist
- Rowena Cole (born 1992), British runner
- Roy Cole (1932–2012), American type designer
- Roy Cole (sport shooter) (1912–1999), Canadian sport shooter

=== S ===
- Sadie Chandler Cole (1865–1941), American singer
- Sally Cottrell Cole (1800–1875), American enslaved maid
- Samantha Cole (born 1978), American singer
- Samuel Cole (disambiguation), multiple people
- Sandy Cole (born 1953), American politician
- Sarah Cole (painter) (1805–1857), American painter
- Sarah Cole (writer), American writer
- Scott Cole, American writer
- Shannon Cole (born 1984), Australian footballer
- Shaun Cole (born 1963), British cosmologist
- Shaun Cole (baseball) (born 1979), American baseball coach
- Shelly Cole (born 1975), American actress
- Sheryl Cole (born 1964), American politician
- Shirley Bell Cole (1920–2010), American actress
- Sidney Cole (1908–1998), British film producer
- Simon Cole (born 1958), British media executive
- Slim Cole (1892–??), American stuntman
- Soji Cole, Nigerian playwright
- Sonia Nassery Cole (born 1965), Afghani-American activist
- Stacey Cole (born 1982), English volleyball player
- Stanley Cole (disambiguation), multiple people
- Stela Cole (born 1997), American singer-songwriter
- Stephanie Cole (1941–2026), English actress
- Stephen Cole (disambiguation), multiple people
- Steve Cole (born 1970), American saxophonist
- Steven Cole (born 1982), British actor
- Steven Cole (tenor) (born 1949), American opera singer
- Stewart Cole (born 1965), British/French microbiologist
- Stranger Cole (born 1942), Jamaican singer
- Stu Cole (born 1966), American baseball player
- Susan Cole (disambiguation), multiple people
- Susanna Cole (1633–1713), American colonist
- Syn Cole (born 1988), Estonian disc jockey

=== T ===
- Tammy Cole (born 1973), Australian field hockey player
- Taylor Cole (born 1984), American actress
- Taylor Cole (baseball) (born 1989), American baseball player
- Teju Cole (born 1975), Nigerian-American writer
- Tennyson Cole (1862–1939), English painter
- Terence Cole (disambiguation), multiple people
- Theodore Cole (disambiguation), multiple people
- Thomas Cole (disambiguation), multiple people
- Tiffany Cole (born 1981), American murderer
- Tim Cole (1960–1999), American wrongfully convicted man
- Timothy Cole (1852–1931), American engraver
- Tina Cole (born 1943), American actress
- T. N. Cole (1844–1924), Australian umpire
- Tobias Cole (born 1971), Australian countertenor
- Tommy Cole (born 1941), American make-up artist
- Tony Cole (born 1947), Australian public servant
- Tonye Cole (born 1967), Nigerian businessman
- Toody Cole (born 1948), American musician
- Tosin Cole (born 1992), American-British actor
- Trent Cole (born 1982), American football player
- Trevor Cole (disambiguation), multiple people
- Tristan de Vere Cole (born 1935), English television director
- Triston Cole (born 1976), American politician
- Troy Cole (born 1986), American soccer player
- Tyson Cole (born 1970), American chef

=== U ===
- Ulric Cole (1905–1992), American pianist

=== V ===
- Vernon Cole (1938–1972), American football player
- Victor Cole (born 1968), Russian baseball player
- Vinson Cole (born 1950), American tenor
- Virginia Cole (1947–2018), Irish actress

=== W ===
- Walter Cole, American politician
- Walter L. Cole (1???–1943), Irish merchant and politician
- Warren Cole (disambiguation), multiple people
- Wertha Pendleton Cole (1891–1959), American academic administrator
- Whitefoord Russell Cole (1874–1934), American businessman
- William Cole (disambiguation), multiple people
- Willie Cole (born 1955), American sculptor
- Willis Cole (1882–1965), American baseball player
- Willis Vernon Cole (1882–1939), American poet
- W. Sterling Cole (1904–1987), American politician

=== X ===
- Xhosa Cole (born 1997), British musician

=== Z ===
- Zach Cole (born 2000), American baseball player
- Zena Cole, American Paralympic discus thrower
- Zeralda Elizabeth Cole (1825–1911), American woman

== Fictional characters ==
- Augustus Cole, in the video game Gears of War
- Buddy Cole (character), in the Canadian television series The Kids in the Hall
- Elizabeth Cole, American Girl character, best friend of Felicity Merriman
- Norris Cole (Coronation Street), in the soap opera Coronation Street
- Rust Cohle, a television character in True Detective

== See also ==
- Cole (disambiguation)
- Cole (given name)
- Coles (surname)
- Coe (surname)
- Kole (name)
- General Cole (disambiguation)
- Judge Cole (disambiguation)
- Justice Cole (disambiguation)
- Senator Cole (disambiguation)
