= Thomas Cole (disambiguation) =

Thomas Cole may refer to:

== Politicians ==
- Thomas Cole (Westminster MP) (died 1597), English politician
- Thomas Cole (died 1413), MP for Weymouth
- Thomas Cole (MP for Melcombe Regis) 1399–1407, MP for Melcombe Regis
- Thomas Cole (died 1681) (1622–1681), MP for Winchester
- Tom Cole (born 1949), American Republican politician
- Thomas Loftus Cole (1877–1961), Unionist politician in Northern Ireland

== Sports ==
- Tom Cole (umpire) (1844–1924), Australian cricket umpire
- Tom Cole (footballer) (born 1997), Australian rules footballer
- Tom Cole (rower) (born c. 1827), English rower
- Tom Cole (racing driver) (1922–1953), British racing driver
- Thomas Cole (cricketer) (1846–1900), English cricketer

== Others ==
- Thomas Cole (archdeacon of Essex) (died 1571), English Protestant churchman
- Thomas Cole (minister) (1628–1697), English Independent
- Thomas Cole (dean of Norwich) (died 1731), Anglican priest
- Thomas Cole (1801–1848), American painter
- Thomas C. Cole (1810-1889), English-born pioneer of Victorian horticulture in Australia
- Thomas F. Cole (businessman) (1862–1939), mining executive
  - SS Thomas F.Cole
- Thomas F. Cole (general), United States Army general
- Thomas R. Cole (born 1949), American writer, historian, filmmaker, and gerontologist
- Tom Cole (farmer) (1854–1927), Australian dairy farmer and cattle breeder
- Tom Cole (stockman) (1906–1995), Australian stockman and writer
- Tom Cole (writer) (1933–2009), American playwright and screenwriter
- Tommy Cole (born 1941), American make-up artist

== See also ==
- Thomas Cole Mountain
- Thomas Cole House, the home and the studio of painter Thomas Cole
- Tom Onslow-Cole (born 1987), British racing driver
- Cole (name)
