= R. Cole =

R. Cole may refer to:

- R. Beverly Cole (1829–1901), American physician
- R. Guy Cole Jr. (born 1951), American judge
