= William Cole =

William or Bill Cole may refer to:

== Arts and entertainment ==
- William Cole (musician) (1909–1997), English conductor and organist
- Bill Cole (musician) (born 1937), jazz musician, jazz and African American scholar
- Bill Cole (television journalist) (1922–2006), foreign correspondent for CBS News and public television producer

== Military and law enforcement ==
- William Cole (police officer) (c. 1840–1900), British policeman
- William Carey Cole (1868–1935), U.S. Navy admiral
  - USS William C. Cole, a destroyer escort named after the admiral
- William E. Cole (1874–1953), U.S. Army general

== Politics ==
- William Colle (fl. 1397–1414), MP for Leominster in 1397
- William Cole (burgess) (1691–1729), planter and member of the House of Burgesses, grandson of William Cole (immigrant)
- William Cole (councillor) (1638–1694), planter and member of the Virginia Governor's Council, son of William Cole (immigrant)
- William Cole (planter) (c.1571–1653), English planter, politician and soldier in Ireland
- William Cole (immigrant) (c. 1598-before 1664), English planter, politician and family founder in Virginia
- William Cole, 1st Earl of Enniskillen (1736–1803), Irish peer and politician
- William Cole, 3rd Earl of Enniskillen (1807–1886), known as Viscount Cole
- William Cole (Australian politician) (1858–1938), South Australian House of Assembly
- William Cole (public servant) (1926–2019), Australian
- William Clay Cole (1897–1965), U.S. congressman from Missouri
- William H. Cole IV (born 1972), city councilman from Baltimore
- William Hinson Cole (1837–1886), U.S. congressman from Maryland and Confederate surgeon
- William Purington Cole Jr. (1889–1957), U.S. congressman from Maryland and judge
- W. Sterling Cole (1904–1987), U.S. congressman from New York
- William J. Cole, state treasurer of Mississippi
- Bill Cole (Montana politician), mayor of Billings, Montana, 2017
- Bill Cole (West Virginia politician) (born 1956), member of the West Virginia Senate

== Religion ==
- William Cole (dean of Lincoln) (c. 1530–1600), English Puritan clergyman
- William Cole (antiquary) (1714–1782), Cambridgeshire clergyman
- William Cole (dean of Waterford) (died 1804)
- William Owen Cole (1931–2013), British scholar in religious studies

== Sports ==
- William C. "King" Cole (1881–1968), American college football player and coach
- Billy Cole (footballer) (1909–1958), Australian rules footballer
- Billy Cole (born 1965), English shot putter

== Medicine ==
- William Cole (botanist) (1626–1662), English herbalist
- William Cole (physician) (1635–1716), English physician and medical writer
- William Harder Cole (1892–1967), American science educator

== Other people ==
- William Rossa Cole (1919–2000), American children's writer
- William Washington Cole (1847–1915), part owner of the Barnum & Bailey Circus
- William Cole (scholar) (1753–1806), English classical scholar

== See also ==
- Willie Cole (born 1955), American sculptor, printer, and artist
