= Max Hyde Jr. =

American politician

Member of the South Carolina House of Representatives from the 32nd district
- In office November 12, 2018 – 2024
- Preceded by: Derham Cole
- Succeeded by: Scott Montgomery

Personal details
- Born: October 29, 1973 (age 52) Spartanburg, South Carolina, U.S.
- Party: Republican
- Education: Davidson College (BA); University of South Carolina (JD)

Max T. Hyde Jr. (born October 29, 1973) is an American politician. He is a former member of the South Carolina House of Representatives from the 32nd District, serving from 2018 to 2024. He is a member of the Republican party.

== Political career ==
Prior to service in the State legislature, Hyde served on Spartanburg City Council before resigning to run for state office.

Hyde opted not to seek re-election in 2024.
