= Douglas Cole =

Douglas Cole may refer to:

- G. D. H. Cole (1889–1959), English historian
- Douglas Cole (historian) (1938–1998), Canadian historian
- Douglas R. Cole (born 1964), American judge
- Douglas Seaman Cole, former Canadian ambassador to Mexico
- Douglas Cole, mayor of Largo, Florida
- Doug Cole, footballer
