= Gentech Pharmaceutical =

Dietary supplement company

- Gentech Pharmaceutical logo
- Type: Private
- Industry: Pharmaceutical
- Founded: 2010; 16 years ago in Delaware, U.S.
- Founder: Derek Vest
- Headquarters: Fort Myers, Florida, U.S.
- Area served: United States
- Products: Avastin; Herceptin; Rituxan
- Parent: Lexium International, LLC

Gentech Pharmaceutical is a company that develops and markets branded dietary supplements. ABC News identified the company as one that manufactures "Adderall knockoffs". It has corporate offices in Clitheroe, England and Fort Myers, Florida, US and production facilities in Miami and Orlando, Florida.

== History ==
Gentech was originally established in 2001 as "Superior Rx" by current CEO Derek Vest of Fort Myers, Florida. Through growth and merger, the name Gentech Pharmaceutical was adopted in 2009 in the United Kingdom and in 2010 for the United States operations. Superior RX became a manufacturer of the prescription medications albuterol and ipratropium in the United States.

In 2009, with the new name, Gentech released its first branded products, PhenTabz and PhenTabzRX.

== Controversy and product safety ==
The companies products have not been evaluated or approved by the FDA for sale as medications in the United States. Philip Cole, the director of pharmacology and molecular sciences at Johns Hopkins University, said of the product "ADDTabz" marketed as an Adderall substitute: "Some of the chemicals we're talking about are only in prescribed medicines. The notion that they're also in dietary supplements is a significant concern." In 2012, The Harvard Crimson pulled advertising for the same supplement after complaints.
