= Fred Cole =

Fred or Frederick Cole may refer to:

- Fred Cole (musician) (1948–2017), singer, guitarist, and songwriter of the band Pierced Arrows and formerly Dead Moon
- Fred Cole (footballer) (born 1936), Australian rules footballer
- Fred Cole (businessman) (1901–1964),American leader in women's swimwear fashions
- Fred C. Cole (1912–1986), American librarian and historian
- Fred Cole (gridiron football) (1937–2013), Canadian football player
- Fred Cole (EastEnders), soap opera character
- Frederick Cole (cricketer) (1852–1941), English cricketer
- Frederick W. Cole, British stained-glass artist and designer

== See also ==
- Freddy Cole (born 1931), American jazz singer and pianist
