= General Cole =

General Cole may refer to:

- Charles H. Cole (1871–1952), Massachusetts Volunteer Militia general
- Eli K. Cole (1867–1929), U.S. Marine Corps major general
- Eric Cole (British Army officer) (1906–1992), British Army major general
- Galbraith Lowry Cole (1772–1842), British Army general
- George Cole (British Army officer) (1911–1973), British Army lieutenant general
- George M. Cole (1853–1933), U.S. Army major general
- George W. Cole (1827–1875), Union Army brevet major general
- John T. Cole (1895–1975), U.S. Army brigadier general
- Jonathan Cole (British Army officer) (born 1967), British Army major general
- Nelson D. Cole (1833–1899), U.S. Army brigadier general
- Thomas F. Cole (general) (born 1928), U.S. Army major general
- William E. Cole (1874–1953), U.S. Army major general

== See also ==
- Attorney General Cole (disambiguation)
