= Isaac Fisher =

Isaac Fisher may refer to:

- Isaac Fisher (cricket umpire) (1851–1944), Australian cricket umpire
- Isaac Fisher (educator) (1877–1957), American educator
