= Donald Cole =

Donald Cole may refer to:

- Donald Cole (anthropologist) (born 1941), American anthropologist
- Donald Cole (painter), American abstract painter
- Donald B. Cole (1922–2013), American historian
- Donald Cole (basketball) (born 1981), American basketball player

== See also ==
- Donald Coles, English footballer
