= Gabriella Hermon =

American linguist

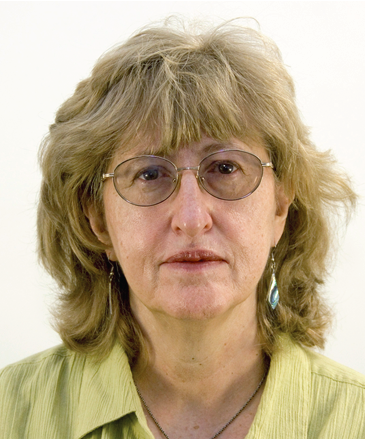
Gabriella Hermon in 2012

Gabriella Hermon is an American linguist, professor emerita at the University of Delaware.

== Career ==
Hermon received her Ph.D. in Linguistics from the University of Illinois in 1981, and has taught at San Diego State University, and the University of Illinois, as well as the University of Delaware.

Hermon is one of the leading experts in the syntax of the Austronesian languages of Indonesia and Malaysia. She is especially well known for her work on voice and question formation in the Malay spoken in rural Sumatra, but an additional important contribution is her participation in a large scale study of language acquisition by children in Jakarta. This study documents how children acquire Indonesian, and is one of the few such studies of language acquisition in major Asian languages.

She has published numerous articles in such major journals as Language, Linguistic Inquiry and Lingua.

She was married to fellow linguist Peter Cole (1941-2023), with whom she regularly conducted joint research.

== Publications ==
Among Dr. Hermon's best known works are her 1985 book, "Syntactic Modularity", published by Foris; her 2002 article "The Typology of Wh-Movement, Wh-Questions in Malay" published in Syntax; her 1994 book (edited) Language in the Andes, published by the Latin American Studies Program of the University of Delaware; and her 2008 article, "Voice in Malay/Indonesian", published in Lingua.
