= Robert Coles =

Robert Coles may refer to:

- Robert Coles (settler) (c. 1600–1655), early American settler
- Robert Coles (psychiatrist) (1928–2026), American author, child psychiatrist and academic
- Robert Coles (golfer) (born 1972), English golfer
- Robert T. Coles (1929–2020), architect, educator, and social justice activist

== See also ==
- Robert Cole (disambiguation)
- Coles (disambiguation)
- Robert T. Coles House and Studio, a historic home and design studio in Buffalo, Erie County, New York, US
