= Eric Cole =

Eric Cole may refer to:

- Eric Cole (British Army officer) (1906–1992), British army officer and cricketer
- Eric Cole (golfer) (born 1988), American golfer
- Eric Cole (scientist), American scientist
- Eric Michael Cole (born 1976), American actor

== See also ==
- Erik Cole (born 1978), American ice hockey player
