= Robert Cole =

Robert Cole may refer to:

== Entertainment ==
- Robert William Cole (1869–1937), British writer
- Robert Walton Cole (1931-2026), American conductor, impresario, and arts administrator
- Bob Cole (composer) (1868–1911), American composer
- Bobby Cole (musician) (1932–1996), American musician

== Sports ==
- Bob Cole (cricketer) (born 1938), former English cricketer
- Bob Cole (sportscaster) (1933–2024), Canadian sports announcer
- Bobby Cole (golfer) (born 1948), South African golfer

== Other ==
- Robert Cole (MP), Member of Parliament for Gloucester
- Robert G. Cole (1915–1944), American soldier who received the Medal of Honor
- Robert MacFarlan Cole III (1889–1986), American chemical engineer, inventor, and author
- Robert Benjamin Ageh Wellesley Cole (1907–1995), Sierra Leonean medical doctor

== See also ==
- Robert G. Cole Junior-Senior High School, San Antonio, Texas, United States
- Robert Coles (disambiguation)
- Cole (name)
