= Nicholas Cole =

Nicholas Cole may refer to:

- Nick Cole (born 1984), American football player
- Nick Cole (racing driver) in Formula F100
- Sir Nicholas Cole, 1st Baronet (died 1660), English Royalist during the English Civil War
- Sir Nicholas Cole, 3rd Baronet (1685–1711), of the Cole baronets

== See also ==
- Cole (name)
- Nicholas Coles (disambiguation)
