= Louis Cole (disambiguation) =

Louis Cole is an American singer-songwriter. Louis Cole may also refer to:

- Louis Cole (YouTuber), English-born film-maker and YouTube personality
- Edwin Louis Cole, founder of the Christian Men's Network
