= Stephen Cole =

Stephen or Steven Cole may refer to:

- Stephen Cole (broadcaster) (born 1954), news presenter
- Stephen Cole (sociologist) (1941–2018), professor of sociology at State University of New York, Stony Brook
- Stephen Cole (writer) (born 1971), author of children's books and science fiction
- Stephen V. Cole, American game designer
- Steven Cole (tenor), African-American opera singer
- Steven Cole, British actor
- Steve Cole, American saxophone player
