= Nicholas Coles (disambiguation) =

Nicholas Coles is a British-American scholar.

Nicholas Coles may also refer to:

- Nick Coles, English cricketer
- Nicky Coles (born 1972), New Zealand rower

== See also ==
- Nicholas Cole (disambiguation)
- Coles (surname)
