= Alfred Cole =

Alfred Cole may refer to:

- Al Cole, boxer
- Alfred Jack Cole (scientist)
- Alfred Cole, sole survivor of Allen Gardiner (schooner) disaster
- Alfred Clayton Cole (1854–1920), merchant and director of the Bank of England, Governor of the Bank of England from 1911 to 1913
- C. Alfred Cole, on List of bishops of the Episcopal Church in the United States of America
