= Richard Cole (disambiguation) =

Richard Cole (1946–2021) was a British tour manager and author.

Richard Cole (or Coles) or Dick Cole may also refer to:

== Richard Cole ==
- Richard Cole (died 1614) (1568–1614), member of the Devonshire gentry
- Richard Cole (politician) (1671–1729), Irish House of Commons
- R. Beverly Cole (1829–1901), American physician
- Richard E. Cole (1915–2019), U.S. Air Force lieutenant colonel
- Richie Cole (musician) (1948–2020), American jazz saxophonist
- Richard T. Cole (born 1948), professor at Michigan State University
- Richard J. Cole (born 1957), professor of computer science at New York University
- Richie Cole (footballer) (born 1983), Australian rules footballer
- Richard Cole (EastEnders), fictional character from British soap opera EastEnders

== Dick Cole ==
- Dick Cole (baseball) (1926–2018), American Major League shortstop
- Dick Cole (politician) (born 1968), Cornish councillor
- Dick Cole, the protagonist of The Adventures of Dick Cole

== See also ==
- Richard Coles (born 1962), journalist, musician, and Church of England vicar
- Richard Coles (civil servant) (1862–1935), British civil servant
