= Peter Cole (disambiguation) =

Peter Cole (born 1957) is an American poet and translator.

Peter Cole may also refer to:

- Peter Harold Cole, electronic engineer
- Peter Cole (linguist), American linguist (1941–2023)
- Pete Cole, American football player
- Peter Cole (film editor), winner of 17th Daytime Emmy Awards
- Pete Cole of This Film Is Not Yet Rated
- Pete Cole, manager/promoter of Inter (band)

== See also ==
- Peter Coles, cosmologist
