= Sue Cole =

Sue Cole may refer to:

- Sue Cole, character in Without Children
- Sue Cole, character in The Feed (British TV series)

== See also ==
- Susan Cole (disambiguation)
- Susanna Cole (1633–1713), lone survivor of a Native American attack
