= Edwin Cole =

Edwin Cole may refer to:

- Edwin Louis Cole (1922–2002), founder of the Christian Men's Network
- Edwin Cole (RAF officer) (1895–?), World War I flying ace
- Buddy Cole (musician) (Edwin LeMar Cole, 1916–1964), jazz pianist and orchestra leader
