= Ralph Cole =

Ralph Cole may refer to:

- Ralph Cole (chancellor), English medieval Chancellor of Oxford University
- Ralph Cole (Ohio representative) (1914–1999), member of the Ohio House of Representatives
- Ralph D. Cole (1873–1932), U.S. Representative from Ohio
- Sir Ralph Cole, 2nd Baronet (1629–1704), English politician.

== See also ==
- Cole (name)
