= Neil Cole (disambiguation) =

Neil Cole is an actor and presenter.

Neil Cole may also refer to:

- Neil Cole (politician)
- Neil Cole (racing driver)
- Neil Cole (firefighter) in 2013 New Year Honours

== See also ==
- Neil Coles, golfer
- Cole (surname)
