= Colin Cole =

Colin Cole may refer to:

- Colin Cole (American football) (born 1980), Canadian born, American football player
- Colin Cole (officer of arms) (1922–2001), English officer of arms
- Colin Cole (cricketer) (1916–1994), English cricketer
- Colin Cole (fashion designer) (1931–1987), New Zealand fashion designer
