= Scott Montgomery (politician) =

American politician

Member of the South Carolina House of Representatives from the 32nd district
- Incumbent
- Assumed office November 11, 2024
- Preceded by: Max Hyde Jr.

Personal details
- Party: Republican

W. Scott Montgomery IV is an American politician. He is a member of the South Carolina House of Representatives from the 32nd District, serving from 2024. He is a member of the Republican party.

== Political career ==
In 2024, Republican incumbent Max Hyde Jr., opted not to seek re-election for House seat 32 in 2024. Montgomery was the sole candidate for the seat, and had no opposition in the general election.

Montgomery serves on the House Legislative Oversight and Medical, Military, Public and Municipal Affairs committees.

== Personal life ==
Montgomery is a descendant of Walter Scott Montgomery Jr., head of Spartan Mills.
