= Alhassan Cole =

Sierra Leonean politician

District Council Chairman of the Western Area Rural District
- Incumbent
- Assumed office 2008

Personal details
- Born: 15 July 1955 (age 71) Waterloo, British Sierra Leone
- Party: All People's Congress (APC)
- Education: Fourah Bay College

Alhassan Cole (born July 15, 1955) is a Sierra Leonean politician who has been the district council chairman of the Western Area Rural District since 2008. He was re-elected as council chairman of the Western Area Rural District in the 2012 Sierra Leone local council elections. He is a prominent member of the All People's Congress party.
