= Kate Cole =

Australian actress

Kate Cole is an Australian actress who is best known for her work with the Red Stitch Actors Theatre, based in St Kilda, Victoria. She has also had guest roles on Australian television, including playing the part of "Go Go" Riley in the Australian soap opera Neighbours.

== Filmography ==
=== Film ===
Year	Title	Role	Notes
2003	Horseplay	Waitress	Uncredited
2011	Final Sale	Jen	
2021	Surrogate	Janet Bayer	

=== Television ===
Year	Title	Role	Notes
1993–2005	Neighbours	Riley / Girl	8 episodes
1999	Stingers	Susie Parks	Episode: "Talker"
2000	Dogwoman: A Grrrl's Best Friend	Claire McKay	Television film
2002	Blue Heelers	Lorelai	Episode: "Teamwork"
2003	CrashBurn	Judy	Episode: "Voss in Monaco"
2005	Wicked Science	Neandathal	Episode: "The Great Dark"
2011	Borderline Murder	Heather	Television film
2012	The Frontier	Mrs. Turner	Television film
2015	The Divorce	Helena	4 episodes
2017	Seven Types of Ambiguity	Helen	Episode: "Mitch"
2017	The Doctor Blake Mysteries	Barbara Cornish	Episode: "The Call of the Void"
2018	How to Stay Married	Liz	Episode #1.4
2020	Wentworth	ICU Nurse Sarah Edwards	Episode: "Revenant"
