= Aaron Cole (basketball) =

Australian basketball player

Personal information
- Born: 2 August 1973 (age 53) Melbourne, Victoria
- Listed height: 197 cm (6 ft 6 in)
- Listed weight: 93 kg (205 lb)

Career information
- Playing career: 1993–1997
- Position: Guard

Career history
- 1995–1996: Hobart Tassie Devils / Hobart Devils

Aaron Cole (born 2 August 1973) is an Australian former professional basketball player. He played two seasons in the National Basketball League (NBL) for the Hobart Tassie Devils / Hobart Devils from 1995 to 1996. Cole averaged 1.6 points, 0.9 rebounds and 0.4 assists in 28 games played.

Cole was born in Melbourne, Victoria, and played for the Nunawading Spectres during his junior years. He played in the Continental Basketball Association (CBA) from 1993 to 1997.
