= Stanley Cole =

Stanley Cole may refer to:

- Stanley Cole (water polo) (1945–2018), American water polo player
- Stanley Cole (architect) (1924–2013), American architect
- Stanley Cole (politician) (1860–1942), Australian politician
