= Justice Cole =

Justice Cole may refer to:

- Charles Cleaves Cole (1841–1905), associate justice of the Supreme Court of the District of Columbia
- Chester C. Cole (1824–1913), chief justice of the Iowa Supreme Court
- James L. Cole (c. 1814–1883), justice of the Louisiana Supreme Court
- John Cole (judge) (1715–1777), chief justice of the Rhode Island Supreme Court
- Luther F. Cole (1925–2013), associate justice of the Louisiana Supreme Court
- Orsamus Cole (1819–1903), associate justice of the Wisconsin Supreme Court
- Ralph Cole (Ohio representative) (1914–1999), substitute associate justice of the Ohio Supreme Court

== See also ==
- Judge Cole (disambiguation)
