= Leslie Cole =

Leslie Cole may refer to:

- Leslie Cole (sprinter) (born 1987), American sprint athlete
- Leslie Cole (artist) (1910–1976), British artist and teacher
- Leslie George Cole (1892–1978), Australian illusionist
