= Rebel A. Cole =

American finance professor

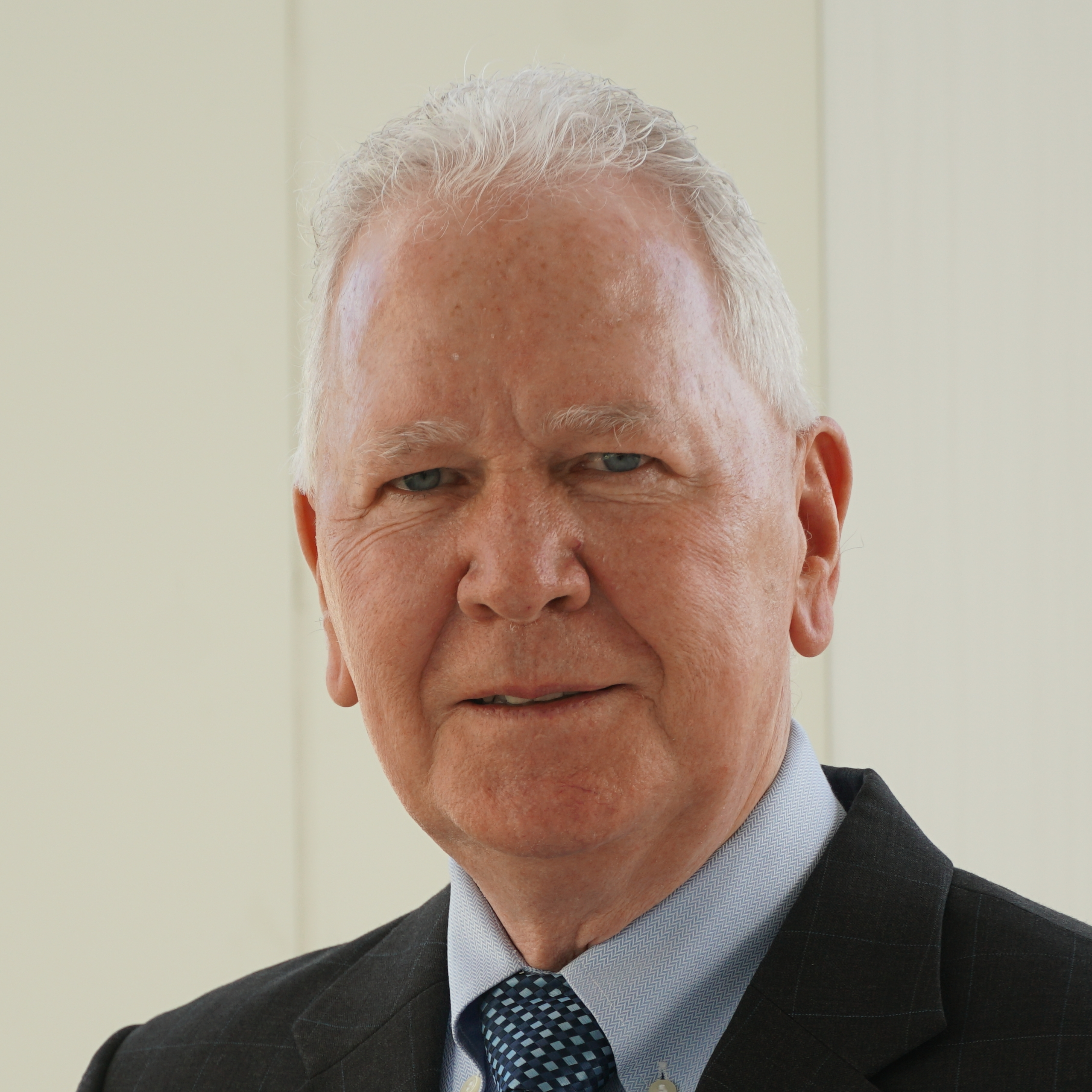
- Born: Rebel Allen Cole; August 25, 1958 (age 68); Asheville, NC
- Education: Bachelor's of Arts in Economics, University of North Carolina at Chapel Hill; Ph.D. in Business Administration, University of North Carolina at Chapel Hill
- Occupation: Professor
- Spouse: Caroline Lee
- Relatives: Gail K. Godwin; Franchelle Millender
- Writing career
- Genre: Finance
- Notable works: Agency costs and ownership structure (Journal of Finance, 2000); The importance of relationships to the availability of credit (Journal of Banking and Finance, 1998); Cookie-cutter versus character: The micro structure of small-business lending by large and small banks (Journal of Financial & Quantitative Analysis, 2004)
- Website: rebelcole.com

Rebel A. Cole is an American economist and professor of finance whose research focuses on banking, commercial real estate, and small business finance. He is best known for his work on corporate governance, bank performance, and the availability of credit to small businesses. His research has been cited in major news outlets and used in policy discussions related to banking regulation and small business lending.

== Early life and education ==
Cole was born in Asheville, North Carolina in 1958. He attended the Asheville School and then the University of North Carolina at Chapel Hill. From UNC, he received an A.B. in Economics and a Ph.D. in Business Administration with specialization in Finance.

== Career ==
Cole began his professional career in 1987 as a financial economist at the Federal Home Loan Bank Board, followed by a stint as a financial economist at the Federal Reserve Bank of Dallas, and then as a financial analyst in the Division of Banking Supervision & Regulation at the Federal Reserve Board where he led the development of SEER—the Fed's statistical early warning system for bank failures. After completing development of SEER in 1993, Cole became the co-principal investigator of the 1993 National Survey of Small Business Finance. In this position, he began what has become more than 30 years of research on the availability of credit to small firms.

In 1998, Cole returned to academia as a professor of finance--first at the University of Auckland in New Zealand, then at the University of New South Wales, in Sydney, Australia, at DePaul University in Chicago, and, finally, to Florida Atlantic University in Boca Raton, Florida, where he serves as the Lynn Eminent Scholar Chaired Professor of Finance.

While at FAU, Cole developed a COVID-19 tracker website for the state of Florida, which provided detailed county- and state-level information on Florida COVID-19 testing, hospitalizations and deaths during 2020 - 2021.

Cole also has served as a consultant to international organizations, advising the International Monetary Fund, the World Bank, and the Asian Development Bank, primarily on issues related to banking supervision and financial stability.

== Research ==
According to Google Scholar, Cole has written more than 100 articles that have been cited by other scholars more than 15,000 times and almost 4,000 times according to Web of Science. Cole's articles have appeared in leading academic journals including as The Journal of Finance, the Journal of Financial Economics, the Journal of Financial and Quantitative Analysis, and the Review of Finance. He is best known for his works on agency costs & ownership structure, access to credit by small businesses, and bank failures. His research interests focus on corporate governance, entrepreneurship, financial institutions and real estate.

== Media Coverage ==
Cole’s research and commentary on banking, financial regulation, and small business credit have been cited in major national and international news outlets. His analyses have appeared in The Wall Street Journal The Financial Times The New York Times The Washington Post Reuters Forbes Magazine Bloomberg These stories have covered topics such as bank failures, credit availability, financial stability, and regulatory policy.

Cole has also appeared in broadcast interviews on CNN, First Business News, Fox Business News, the PBS Nightly Business Report, NBC's Today Show, as well as on local Chicago and Florida stations.

During the COVID‑19 pandemic, Cole was frequently cited for his analysis of the economic and financial effects of the crisis, including commentary on small business lending, credit markets, and banking conditions.

In 2025, Cole was placed on administrative leave by Florida Atlantic University following public controversy surrounding social media posts related to the assassination of Charlie Kirk. He subsequently filed a federal lawsuit alleging violations of his First Amendment rights. After an external investigation, the university determined that his posts were constitutionally protected speech and reinstated him to his position..

== Selected Publications ==
- Cole, Rebel A. Jason Damm, John Hackney, Masim Suleymanov. 2025. It's not (only) personal, it's business: Personal bankruptcy exemptions and local small business credit. Review of Finance, rfae037
- Cole, Rebel A., David Javakhadze, and Greg Tindall. 2024. Real effects of shareholder proposals: Innovation in the context of climate change. Journal of Business Ethics, 1-28.
- Cole, Rebel A. and Lawrence J. White. 2012. Déjà Vu all over again: The causes of U.S. commercial bank failures this time around. Journal of Financial Services Research 42, 5-29.
- Berkman, Henk, Rebel A. Cole and Lawrence J. Fu. 2010. Political connections and minority-shareholder protection: Evidence from securities-market regulation in China. Journal of Financial & Quantitative Analysis 45, 1391–1417.
- Berkman, Henk, Rebel A. Cole and Lawrence J. Fu. 2009. Expropriation through loan guarantees to related parties: Evidence from China. Journal of Banking & Finance 33, 141–156.
- Cole, Rebel A., Lawrence G. Goldberg and Lawrence J. White. 2004. Cookie-cutter versus character: The micro structure of small-business lending by large and small banks. Journal of Financial & Quantitative Analysis 39, 227–251.
- Ang, James, Rebel A. Cole and James Lin. 2000. Agency costs and ownership structure. The Journal of Finance 55, 81–106.
- Cole, Rebel A. and Hamid Mehran. 1998. The effect of changes in ownership structure on performance: Evidence from the thrift industry. Journal of Financial Economics 50, 291–317.
- Cole, Rebel A. 1998. The importance of relationships to the availability of credit. Journal of Banking & Finance 22, 959–997.
- Cole, Rebel A. and Jeffery W. Gunther. 1998. Predicting bank failures: A comparison of on- and off-site monitoring systems. Journal of Financial Services Research 13, 103–117.
- Cole, Rebel A. and Jeffery W. Gunther. 1995. Separating the likelihood and timing of bank failure. Journal of Banking& Finance 19, 1073–1089.
- Fenn, George W. and Rebel A. Cole. 1994. Announcements of asset-quality problems and contagion effects in the life insurance industry. Journal of Financial Economics 35, 181–198.
