= Archie Cole =

Professional baseball player

- Pitcher
- Born: November 26, 1900; Washington Court House, Ohio, U.S.
- Died: January 10, 1952 (aged 51); Frankfort, Ohio, U.S.
- Batted: Unknown Threw: Right

Negro league baseball debut
- 1923, for the Toledo Tigers

Last appearance
- 1924, for the Detroit Stars
- Stats at Baseball Reference

Teams
- Toledo Tigers (1923); Kansas City Monarchs (1923); Detroit Stars (1924)

Archie Sloane "King" Cole (November 26, 1900 - January 10, 1952) was an American professional baseball pitcher in the Negro leagues. He played with the Toledo Tigers and Kansas City Monarchs in 1923 and the Detroit Stars in 1924. He is also listed as Archie Coley.
