= Joseph Cole =

Joseph or Joe Cole may refer to:

- Joe Cole (actor) (born 1988), English actor
- Joe Cole (born 1981), English footballer
- Joe Robert Cole, American film and television director, writer, and producer
- Joseph Cole (cinematographer), film cinematographer and producer
- Joseph Foxcroft Cole (1837–1892), American landscape artist
- Joseph S. Cole (1831–1916), educator in South Australia
- Joseph E. Cole (1914–1995), American businessman
- Joseph Dennis Cole (1961–1991), roadie for Black Flag and Rollins Band, see Murder of Joe Cole
- Joseph Cole, Malta, see List of ambassadors and high commissioners to the United Kingdom
