= Adrian Cole =

Adrian Cole may refer to:

- Adrian Cole (RAAF officer) (1895–1966), senior commander in the Royal Australian Air Force
- Adrian Cole (writer) (born 1949), English writer
