= Albert Cole =

Albert Cole may refer to:

- Albert Cole (footballer) (born 1981), Sierra Leonean international footballer
- Albert Cole (Massachusetts politician) (1904–1966), Massachusetts politician
- Albert M. Cole (1901–1994), U.S. Representative from Kansas
- Albert Cole, a fictional character in the video game Fallout
