= Arthur Cole =

Arthur Cole may refer to:

- Arthur Charles Cole (1886–1976), American historian
- Arthur Cole (priest) (died 1558), Canon of Windsor and president of Magdalen College, Oxford
- Arthur Cole, 1st Baron Ranelagh (died 1754), Irish politician
- Arthur Cole-Hamilton (1750–1810), Anglo-Irish politician born Arthur Cole
- Arthur Henry Cole (1780–1844), Anglo-Irish politician
- Arthur H. Cole (1889–1974), American economic historian
