= Frank Cole =

Frank Cole may refer to:

- Frank Cole (basketball), British basketball player
- Frank Cole (filmmaker) (1954–2000), Canadian documentary filmmaker
- Frank Nelson Cole (1861–1926), American mathematician
