= Andrew Cole (disambiguation) =

Andrew or Andy Cole may refer to:

- Andy Cole (born 1971), English footballer
- Andrew Cole (rugby union) (1960–2022), Australian rugby union referee
- Andy the Kid (born 1984), Australian rock musician
- Andrew Cole (musician) (born 1982), Canadian musician
- Andrew Cole, 7th Earl of Enniskillen (born 1942), British peer and landowner in Kenya
