= Colin Cole (cricketer) =

English cricketer

Personal information
- Full name: Colin Gibson Cole
- Born: 7 July 1916; Sittingbourne, Kent
- Died: 22 July 1994 (aged 78); Borden, Kent
- Batting: Right-handed
- Bowling: Right-arm fast-medium

Domestic team information
- Years: Team
- 1935–1938: Kent

Career statistics
Competition	First-class
Matches	27
Runs scored	228
Batting average	7.86
100s/50s	0/0
Top score	23*
Balls bowled	3,996
Wickets	61
Bowling average	34.59
5 wickets in innings	2
10 wickets in match	0
Best bowling	6/62
Catches/stumpings	15/–
- Source: CricInfo, 5 December 2010

Colin Gibson Cole (7 July 1916 – 22 July 1994) was an English cricketer. Cole played as a bowler for Kent County Cricket Club between 1935 and 1938.

Cole made his first-class cricket debut for Kent in the 1935 County Championship against Yorkshire at Tonbridge. From 1935 to 1938, he represented the county in 27 first-class matches, the last of which came against Nottinghamshire at Trent Bridge. He took 61 wickets at a bowling average of 34.59, with two five wicket hauls and best figures of 6/62.

Coles played for the Kent Second XI from 1933 to 1938 in the Minor Counties Championship. He made one further appearance for the Second XI after World War II. He was born at Sittingbourne in Kent and died nearby at Borden in July 1994 aged 78.

== Bibliography ==
- Carlaw, Derek (2020). Kent County Cricketers, A to Z: Part Two (1919–1939) (PDF). Cardiff: ACS.
