= Howard Cole =

Howard Cole may refer to:

- G. D. H. Cole (1889–1959), English political theorist, economist, writer and historian
- Howard Cole (speedway rider) (born 1943), Welsh motorcycle speedway rider
- Howard N. Cole (1911–1983), British Army officer and author of books on military subjects
