= Isaac Fisher (cricket umpire) =

Australian cricket umpire (1851–1944)

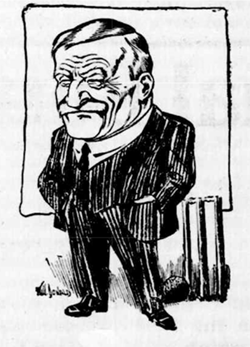
A newspaper cartoon of Isaac Fisher in 1916

Isaac Alfred Fisher (12 April 1851 – 19 June 1944) was an Australian cricket umpire who officiated in one Test match in Australia in 1884.

== Life and career ==
Fisher was born in Adelaide, South Australia, the youngest son of Thomas Fisher. Before taking up umpiring he played for Hindmarsh (later renamed West Torrens), his fellow players including Affie Jarvis and Frank King.

Fisher began umpiring for the South Australian Cricket Association in 1879. He made his debut as a first-class umpire in a match between South Australia and Victoria at Adelaide in February 1884. His second first-class match as umpire was also the only Test match in which he officiated, the Ashes Test played between Australia and England at the Adelaide Oval in December 1884, when the Australian captain Billy Murdoch refused to accept the experienced English player and administrator James Lillywhite as umpire. This was also the only Test match umpired by fellow Australian umpire T. N. Cole.

A timeless Test, the match lasted four days, starting on 12 December and ending on 16 December, with 14 December as a rest day. Despite the batting prowess of Australia's Percy McDonnell (124 and 83 out of Australia's totals of 243 and 191), England won by 8 wickets, with Bobby Peel taking 8 wickets in the match (3/68 and 5/51) and Billy Bates 5/51 in Australia's first innings. The Australian side had been weakened by the absence of Fred Spofforth and Billy Midwinter; George Giffen played despite suffering from rheumatism, and Alec Bannerman damaged his finger attempting to stop a ball in the field and was absent hurt in the Australian second innings.

Fisher continued to umpire first-class matches occasionally in the 1880s and 1890s – all but three in Adelaide – including Sheffield Shield matches in 1894/95, 1895/96 and 1896/97.

Fisher married Elizabeth Jane Whaite (1855 or 1856 – 12 April 1949) of Alberton on 31 January 1877. They both died at their home, 40 Tait Terrace, Croydon, South Australia. A daughter, Iris Fisher, married Capt. Gordon Cathcart Campbell MC and Bar (4 June 1885 – 13 August 1961) on 7 August 1915.

== See also ==
- List of Australian Test cricket umpires
- List of Test umpires
