= Susan Cole =

Susan Cole may refer to:

- Susan G. Cole, Canadian feminist author, activist and playwright
- Susan Cole (academic administrator), president of Montclair State University
- Susan Guettel Cole, American classical scholar
- Susan Cole (Neighbours), a character on the soap opera Neighbours
- Susan Cole (reading clerk), Reading Clerk of the United States House of Representatives

== See also ==
- Sue Cole (disambiguation)
- Susanna Cole, lone survivor of an American Indian attack
