= Luther Cole =

Luther Cole may refer to:

- Luther A. Cole (1812–1880), American businessman and politician in Wisconsin
- Luther F. Cole (1925–2013), American lawyer, judge and politician in Louisiana
