= Attorney General Cole =

Attorney General Cole may refer to:

- Charlie Cole (lawyer) (born 1927), Attorney General of Alaska
- Gordon E. Cole (1833–1890), Attorney General of Minnesota
