= Kenneth Cole =

Kenneth or Ken Cole may refer to:

- Ken Cole (basketball) (1943–2026), Australian Olympic basketball player
- Kenneth Cole (designer) (born 1954), American clothing designer
  - Kenneth Cole Productions, American fashion house founded by the designer
- Kenneth Reese Cole Jr. (1938–2001), aide to U.S. President Richard Nixon
- Kenneth J. Cole (born 1936), Pennsylvania politician
- Kenneth Stewart Cole (1900–1984), American biophysicist
