= Craig Cole =

American football player (born 1975)

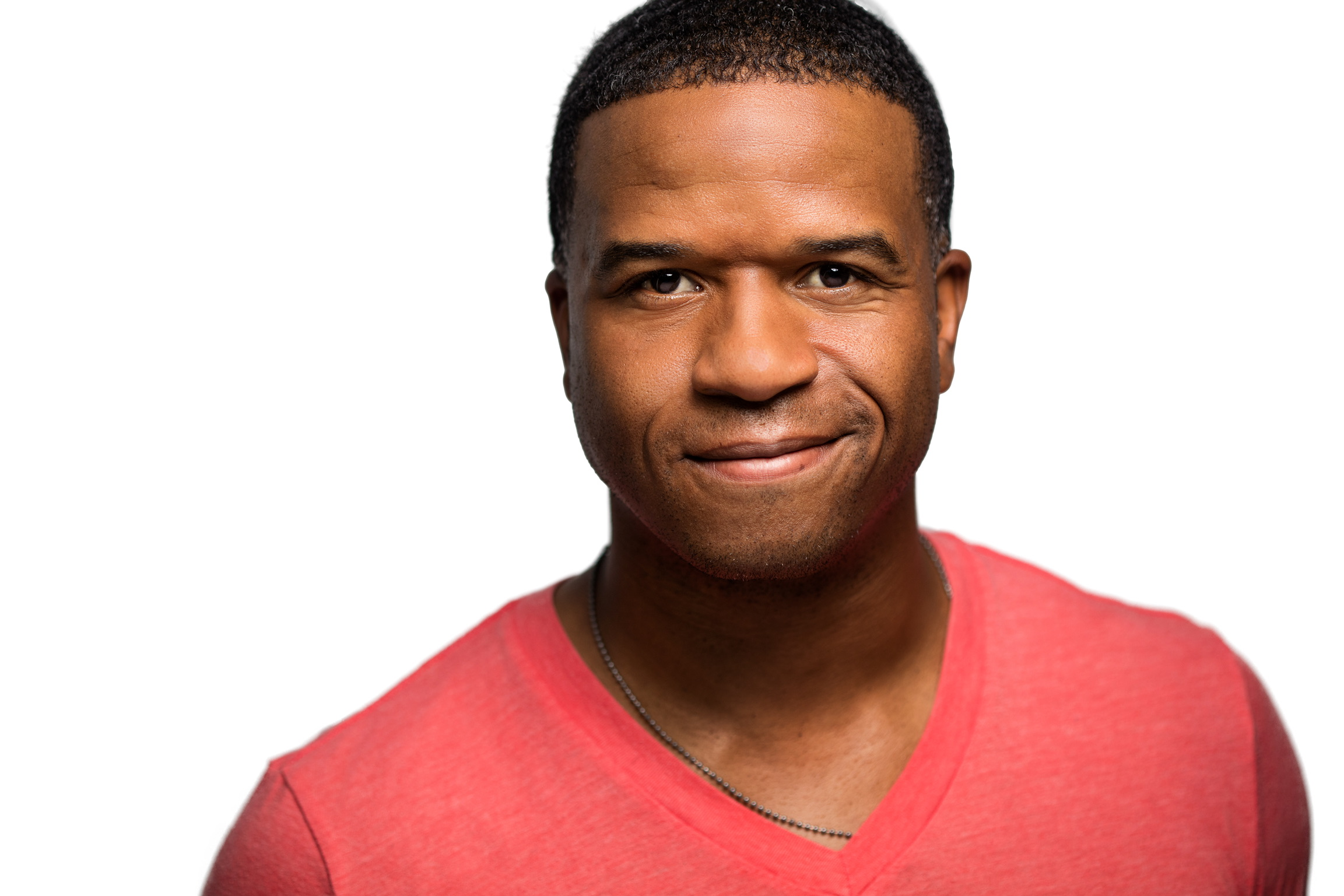

Profile
- Position: Wide receiver/Linebacker

Personal information
- Born: August 11, 1975 (age 51); Omaha, Nebraska, U.S.

Career information
- College: Abilene Christian

Career history
- Grand Rapids Rampage (1999)
- Stats at ArenaFan.com

Craig Cole (born August 11, 1975) is an American former football player, and current actor and stuntman. Craig attended Abilene Christian where he played football. He also played professionally for the Grand Rapids Rampage of the Arena Football League as well as sixth other organizations from 1999 to 2005. He is the cousin of NFL Hall of Famer Marcus Allen. He has appeared in numerous shows including Walker Texas Ranger, Prison Break, Chase, and The Walking Dead.
