= Fred Cole (footballer) =

Australian rules footballer

Personal information
- Full name: William Frederick Cole
- Born: 27 May 1936
- Died: 21 January 2018 (aged 81)
- Original team: Raywood
- Height: 189 cm (6 ft 2 in)
- Weight: 86 kg (190 lb)

Playing career^{1}
Years	Club	Games (Goals)
1956	St Kilda	1 (1)
- ^{1} Playing statistics correct to the end of 1956.

William Frederick Cole (27 May 1936 – 21 January 2018) was an Australian rules footballer who played with St Kilda in the Victorian Football League (VFL).
