= Trevor Cole =

Trevor Cole may refer to:

- Trevor Jack Cole, British-born horticulturalist
- Trevor Cole (writer) (born 1960), Canadian newspaper and magazine columnist and novelist

== Fictional characters ==
- Trevor Cole (comics), Marvel Comics supervillain introduced in Venom: Lethal Protector in 1993
- Trevor Cole (Baywatch), fictional character on the TV series Baywatch, played by Peter Phelps
