= Ernest Cole =

Ernest Cole may refer to:

- Ernest Cole (photographer) (1940–1990), South African photographer
- Ernest Cole (cricketer) (1875–1965), New Zealand cricketer
- Ernest E. Cole (1871–1949), American politician
- Ernest A. Cole (1890–1979), British sculptor and printmaker
- Ernest J. Cole (1916–2000), Canadian politician
