= Samuel Cole =

Samuel Cole may refer to:

- Samuel Cole (settler) (c. 1597–1666/67), early settler of Boston, Massachusetts
- Samuel Cole (politician) (1856–1935), American politician in Massachusetts
- Samuel Cole (footballer) (1874–?), English footballer
- Samuel Cole (Wisconsin pioneer) (1815–1885), American politician in Wisconsin
