= Abdiah Cole =

English physician

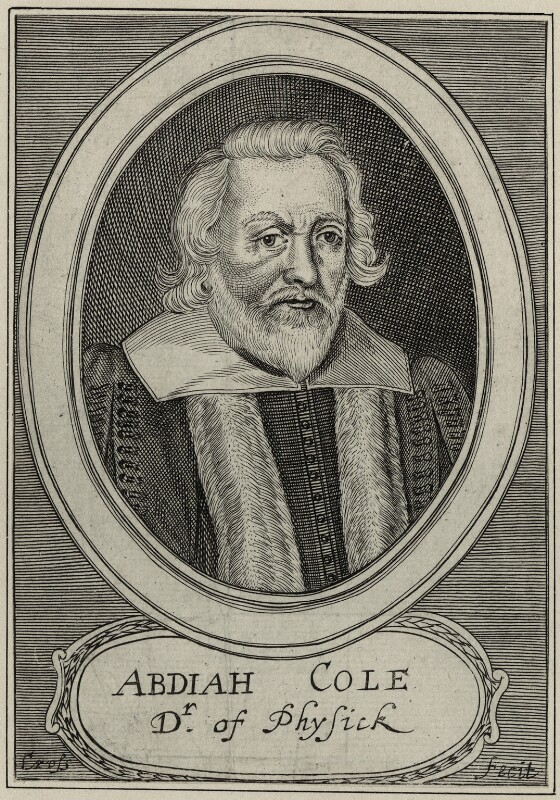
- Occupation: Physician

Abdiah Cole (1610?–1670?) was an English physician.

== Biography ==
Cole was a copious translator and manufacturer of medical books, of whose career little is known. He must have been born early in the seventeenth century, and appears to have passed the earlier part of his life abroad, since he is said to have 'spent twenty-nine years in the service of three of the greatest princes in Europe.' He describes himself as 'doctor of physick and the liberal arts,' but where he graduated is unknown. He did not belong to the College of Physicians. 'In name is often associated with that of Nicholas Culpeper in numerous translations and compilations. These were for the most part originally written by Culpeper, and Cole's name does not appear on the title-pages (with one exception) till after Culpeper's death in 1658. Cole was, therefore, probably employed to edit and revise these works; and the fact that the later editions were mostly printed by Peter and Edward Cole suggested a possible relationship between the printers and the writer. They were all either translations of standard continental works, or semi-popular works of an inferior stamp, and contain little that is original.

The titles of some are:

- 'The Practice of Physick, in seventeen books, by Nicholas Culpeper, Abdiah Cole, and William Rowland, being chiefly a translation of the works of Lazarus Riverius, &c.,' London, 1655, 1668, 1672, folio.
- 'A translation of Felix Plater, entitled ' A Golden Practice of Physick, by F. Plater, Abdiah Cole, &c.,' London, 1662, folio.
- 'Chemistry made easy and useful, by D. Sennertus, N. Culpeper, and Abdiah Cole' (really a translation from Sennertus), 8vo, London, 1662, 1664.
- ' Pharmacopeia Londinensis, translated and edited (not officially) by N. Culpeper and A. Cole,' London, 1661, folio.
- 'Experimental Physick, or 700 cures, being part of the Physitian's Library, by N. Culpeper and Abdiah Cole,' London, 1662, 8vo. These cases (really one thousand in number) were translated from M. Rulandus. This book contains a catalogue of 'Several Physick Books of N. Culpeper and A. Cole, commonly called the Physitian's Library, containing all the works in English of Riverius, Sennertus, Platerus, Riolanus, Bartholinus.' It was also called 'The Rationall Physician's Library, out of the best authors, and from our own experience.' The list contains twenty-seven books in folio and 8vo, including ten volumes of Sennertus, and the anatomical treatises of Riolanus, Bartholinus, and Veslingus, besides those mentioned above; but Cole was not concerned in all of these.

Cole's portrait, in advanced age, with a furred doctor's gown, was engraved by Thomas Cross, and appears with three others on the frontispiece of the 'Riverius.'
