= Ulric Cole =

American classical composer

- Born: September 9, 1905; New York, New York
- Died: May 21, 1992 (aged 86); Bridgeport, Connecticut
- Other name: Frances Ulric Cole
- Education: Juilliard School
- Occupations: Pianist, editor, music educator, composer

Frances Ulric Cole (September 9, 1905 – May 21, 1992) was an American pianist, editor, music educator and composer. She was born in New York and studied in Los Angeles with Homer Grunn, and at the Institute of Musical Arts in New York City (now known as the Juilliard School) and in Paris with Nadia Boulanger.

== Life and work ==
Two of her compositions, Piano Quintet and Violin Sonata no.1, won awards from the Society for the Publication of American Music. Her orchestral compositions have been performed by symphonies in Cincinnati, Sydney, Rochester, Scranton and Lansdowne.

Cole was a founding member of the Society of American Women Composers. She worked as a music teacher for years and, when she became dissatisfied with teaching, she took an editorial position for Time Magazine from 1945 to 1952.

In her later years, she travelled widely and for a time lived on the islands of Tahiti and Vanuatu in the South Pacific Ocean and composed Sunlight Channel in 1948. Cole died in Bridgeport, Connecticut in 1992.

== Works ==
Cole composed mainly for orchestra, chamber ensemble and piano.

- Above the Clouds for piano (pub. 1924)
- Prelude and Fugue in C Minor for two pianos (unpublished; 1924)
- Tunes & Sketches in Black and White for piano (pub. 1926)
- Purple Shadows for piano (pub. 1928)
- Sonata for violin and piano (pub. 1930)
- Hobgoblins for piano (pub. 1931)
- The Prairies for piano (pub. 1931)
- Round Dance for string quartet (unpublished; 1935)
- Vignettes for piano (pub. 1936)
- Piano Trio
- Divertimento for string orchestra and piano (pub. 1939)
- Quintet for piano, 2 violins, viola, and violoncello (pub. 1941)
- Metropolitones: Three Compositions for the Piano (pub. 1943)
- "Man-about-town" from Metropolitones arranged for two pianos, four hands (pub. 1947)
- Nevada for orchestra (unpublished; 1947)
- Sunlight Channel for orchestra (unpublished; 1949)
- Divertimento arranged for two pianos (unpublished; 1971)
