= Natalie Robinson Cole =

American art teacher

Natalie Robinson Cole (1901 – December 12, 1984) was an American educator known for her teaching methods in elementary classrooms. For much of her career, Cole taught inner city children in the Los Angeles area. She wrote two books, Arts in the Classroom (1940) which, as of 1963, had been reprinted thirteen times. Her second book, Children’s Art from Deep Down Inside was published in 1966. Later in her career she held workshops and demonstrations on her method of teaching.

== Biography ==
Cole used art extensively in her elementary classrooms. In addition to painting she led the children through life lessons using clay, free rhythmic dancing, and creative writing. Cole believed that the teacher’s job is to reach for the inner child artist and bring out h/her creativity, fostering to its fullest potential. She believed that children should have first hand experiences from which to draw creative ideas and expression from. These often took the form of common daily experiences both in and outside the school and field trips.

Though her methods appear to be deliberately derived from the Progressive Movement, her involvement with progressive schools was little and informal if any. Cole lived and taught in Los Angeles, California while the Progressive Movement was largely contained in the East. Furthermore, progressive schools were largely elite private schools whereas Cole taught in urban public schools.

A typical lesson in Cole’s classroom would be active and energetic. In painting, for example, students would often stand and paint on large sheets of paper. The subject matter would be of a personal experience by the child, either a story from home, or school, or a field trip. Cole would walk around the room offering gentle encouragement for the children to ‘make it your own way’ and ‘make your pictures fill your paper till it bumps the sides.’ Cole had her students paint large figures first, and then they could weave the details in between.

Before moving to further concepts, Cole waited until a student reached that concept on their own and then she would offer praise and encourage the rest of the class to try out what that student ‘discovered.’ Cole practiced much patience with her students, often having students do ‘warm up’ activities several times until the majority of the children ‘got it.’ For example, for a clay project making cows, she had her students play with the clay, doing their best to make a 3-D cow. The first day only two of the students ‘got it’ and she offered praise, and encouraged the students to do the same, and saved just their cows. Over the next few days, the students practiced making their cows, each day getting a little better at it. Finally, when the majority of the class had a good understanding of the medium, she fired and saved all their little cows.

Cole also integrated concepts across the arts. She had her students engage in ‘free rhythmic dancing.’ This theme carried over to painting of ceramic plates. The themes of the paintings were ‘children dancing.’ Cole believed that the repetition helped children to gain a deeper understanding of their world (i.e. themselves dancing).

Viktor Lowenfeld first compared her to Franz Cižek, an art educator in Vienna Italy (1952). In 1982, Peter Smith wrote Natalie Robinson Cole: The American Cizek? in which he compared the two. His research and personal communications with Cole reveal that while both Cole and Cižek had similar ideas, their fundamental methods were entirely different.

== Selected publications ==
- Cole, Natalie Robinson (1940-01-01). The Arts in the Classroom. C. K. Eaton (3rd ed.). John Day Co.
