= Joshua Cole =

Joshua Cole may refer to:

- Joshua G. Cole (born 1990), member of the Virginia House of Delegates
- 5635 Cole, an asteroid named after fictional character Joshua Cole
