= Des Cole =

Australian rules footballer

Personal information
- Full name: Des Cole
- Born: 27 October 1933
- Died: 25 January 2015 (aged 81)
- Original team: Reywood
- Height: 183 cm (6 ft 0 in)
- Weight: 76 kg (168 lb)

Playing career^{1}
Years	Club	Games (Goals)
1954–55	St Kilda	8 (0)
- ^{1} Playing statistics correct to the end of 1955.

Des Cole (27 October 1933 – 25 January 2015) was an Australian rules footballer who played with St Kilda in the Victorian Football League (VFL).
