= Evan Alex Cole =

American actor

- Born: February 2, 1985 (age 41); Atlanta, Georgia, U.S.
- Occupations: Actor, dental student (Georgia Regents University)
- Years active: 2003–present

Evan Alex Cole (born February 2, 1985) is an American actor. He played Hunter on the American daytime drama As the World Turns.

Born and raised in Atlanta, Georgia, Cole graduated from Carnegie Mellon University in 2008. He received his DMD from The Dental College of GA at Augusta University.

== Filmography ==
- She's Out of My League (2010) as Scotty Reese
- As the World Turns (2009–2010) as Lyon Hunter
- Adventureland (2009) as Prepster Friend
- Law & Order: Criminal Intent (2008) Peter Bottner
- Back When We Were Grownups (2004) as Dixon
- Joan of Arcadia (2003) as Dax Hibbing
