= Scott Cole =

American writer, artist, and graphic designer

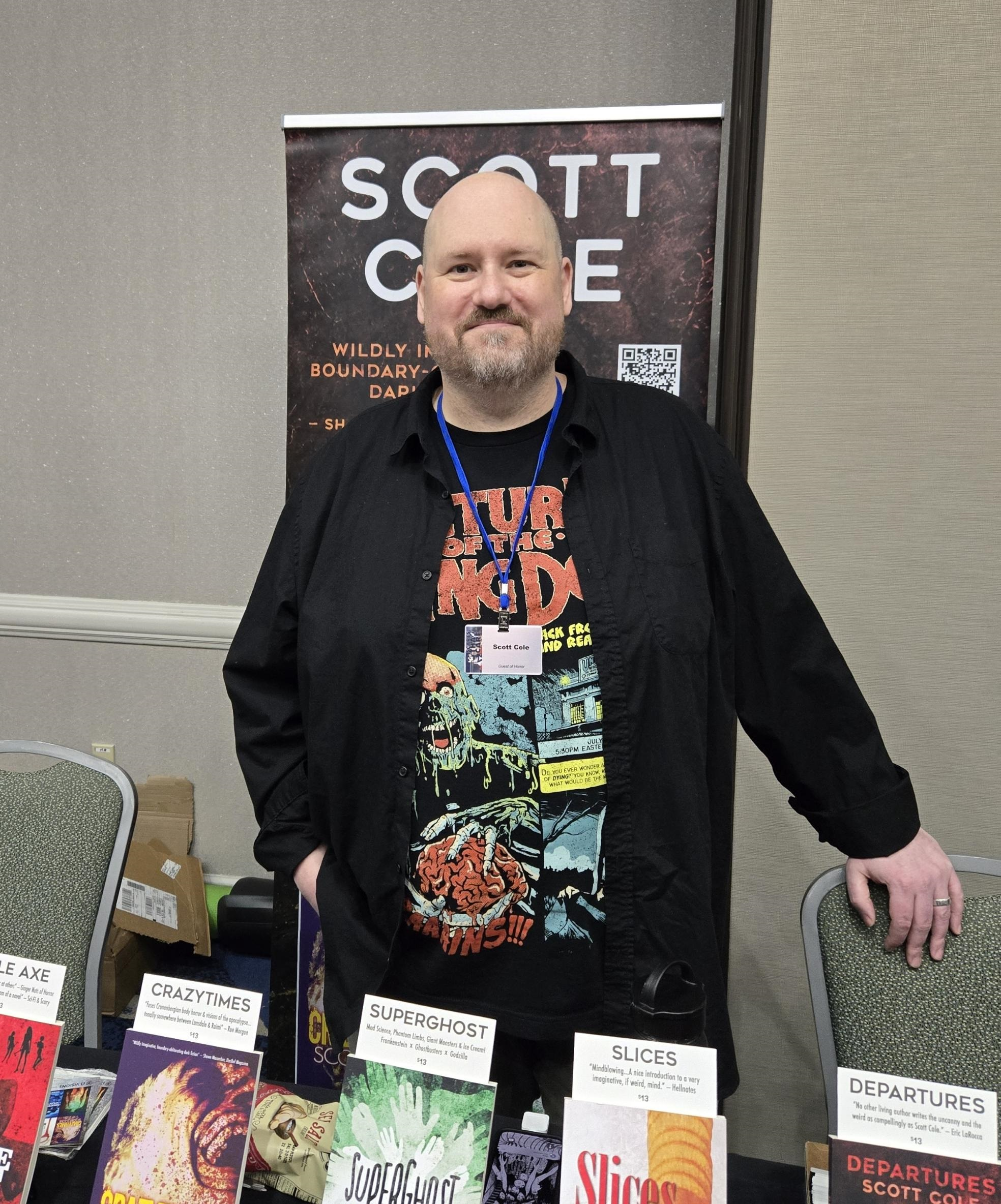
- Scott Cole at AuthorCon 2025
- Occupations: Writer, artist, graphic designer

Scott Cole is an American writer, artist, and graphic designer operating out of Philadelphia.

== Career ==
Cole expressed an interest in horror from a young age and has cited 80s slasher films as well as works such as Night of the Living Dead, Dawn of the Dead, and John Skipp and Craig Spector's Book of the Dead as influences. He also stated that his writing speed differs on what he is writing, as he can complete his first drafts quickly while short stories can take years to complete. He typically creates an outline or framework for his novellas while he does not typically use this for his short stories; the exception for his novellas was Crazytimes, where he based the story on a rough idea he had after waking one morning.

Cole also works as an artist and graphic designer and has created the covers and promotional materials for his works.

== Bibliography ==
=== Novels ===
- SuperGhost (2014)
- Triple Axe (2018)
- Crazytimes (2020)
- Headless (2024)

=== Collections ===
- Slices: Tales of Bizarro and Absurdist Horror (2017)
- SuperGhost (2019)
- Departures (2022)

=== Short stories ===
- "Last Supper" (2009)
- "The Popcorn Challenge" (2010)
- "Brother Barry" (2010)
- "April Showers" (2011)
- "I Change the Leaves" (2011)
- "Cold" (2012)
- "Violins for Sale" (2013)
- "SuperGhost" (2014)
- "666 Baby Jesuses, Give or Take" (2017)
- "A Field of Poppies" (2017)
- "Blow-Up" (2017)
- "Cat Tree Summer" (2017)
- "Dates" (2017)
- "Drive" (2017)
- "Flesh is Flesh" (2017)
- "God" (2017)
- "Happyface" (2017)
- "Hole" (2017)
- "Horns Up" (2017)
- "Landau Made Some Mistakes" (2017)
- "Let it Out" (2017)
- "Melt" (2017)
- "Multi-Crabs" (2017)
- "Mummy Kitty" (2017)
- "Otto" (2017)
- "Playtime" (2017)
- "Rough Night" (2017)
- "Scheduled Meal Service" (2017)
- "Slices of Me" (2017)
- "Smoke Detector" (2017)
- "Sweets" (2017)
- "Tap, Clip, Glue" (2017)
- "The Bigot" (2017)
- "The Eater" (2017)
- "The Magician" (2017)
- "The Pet" (2017)
- "The Regenerates" (2017)
- "The Smile" (2017)
- "We Built the Moon" (2017)
- "Wrecking Ball" (2017)
- "The Science Fair" (2019)
- "Crazytimes" (2020)
- "The Penanggalan" (2020)
- "Greetings from Trammel Beach" (2022)
- "SlashGrindTerrorMachine" (2022)
- "Can't See the Forest" (2022)
- "Clown Noses" (2022)
- "Cold Hands" (2022)
- "Egg House" (2022)
- "Gourds" (2022)
- "Only Bad People" (2022)
- "The Noise Machine" (2022)
- "The Trunk" (2022)
- "Headless" (2024)
