= Eric Cole (scientist) =

Author, scientist, executive

Eric Cole served as chief technology officer at McAfee and chief scientist at Lockheed Martin Corporation. He is the author of several books, including Advanced Persistent Threat; Hackers Beware; Hiding in Plain Sight; Network Security Bible, 2nd Edition; Insider Threat; and his most recent book, Online Danger: How to Protect Yourself and Your Loved Ones From the Evil Side of the Internet. He graduated from New York Institute of Technology with PhD in Computer Science. He died in May 2026.
