= Peter Cole (linguist) =

American linguist (1941–2023)

- Born: 1941
- Died: 2023 (aged 81–82)

Academic background
- Education: University of Illinois
- Thesis: (1873)

Academic work
- Discipline: Linguist
- Institutions: University of Illinois, University of Delaware
- Main interests: syntax, generative grammar, linguistic typology
- Website: Personal webpage

Peter Cole (1941–2023) was an American linguist who made notable contributions to comparative grammar, in particular to the study of Hebrew, Quechua, Chinese and Malay syntax.

== Education and career ==
Cole attended Bard College and first worked as an English teacher in Mexico, Venezuela and Israel. He went on to study linguistics at Southern Illinois University, and received his PhD degree from the University of Illinois in 1973 (supervised by Jerry Morgan) . After teaching there for 15 years, he moved to the University of Delaware, where he worked until his retirement in 2019.

== Scientific contributions ==
Peter Cole's main contributions have been to the study of comparative syntax, especially with respect to relative clauses (e.g. Cole et al. 1977; Cole 1987), switch-reference (e.g. Cole 1983), and reflexive constructions (e.g. Cole et al. 1990; Cole et al. 2006; Cole et al. 2015).

He did fieldwork on several varieties of Quechua (e.g. Cole 1982) and on several varieties of Malay (e.g. Cole & Son 2004; McKinnon et al. 2011).

For many years, Cole was an associate editor of the journal Linguistic Inquiry.

== Personal life ==
Cole was married to linguist Gabriella Hermon, with whom he coauthored numerous works.

== Selected works ==
=== Books ===
- Cole, Peter & Sadock, Jerrold M. (eds.). 1977. Grammatical relations (Syntax and Semantics 8). New York: Academic Press.
- Cole, Peter. 1982. Imbabura Quechua (Lingua Descriptive Studies 5). Amsterdam: North-Holland.
- Cole, Peter & Hermon, Gabriella & Huang, C.-T. James (eds.). 2001. Long-distance reflexives. San Diego: Academic Press.

=== Selected articles ===
- Cole, Peter & Harbert, Wayne & Sridhar, Shikaripur N. & Hashimoto, Sachiko & Nelson, Cecil & Smietana, Diane. 1977. Noun phrase accessibility and island constraints. In Cole, Peter & Sadock, Jerrold M. (eds.), Grammatical relations (Syntax and Semantics 8), 27–46. New York: Academic Press.
- Cole, Peter. 1983. Switch-reference in two Quechuan languages. In Haiman, John & Munro, Pamela (eds.), Switch-reference and universal grammar, 1–16. Amsterdam: Benjamins.
- Cole, Peter. 1987. The structure of internally headed relative clauses. Natural Language & Linguistic Theory 5(2). 277–302.
- Cole, Peter & Hermon, Gabriella & Sung, Li-May. 1990. Principles and parameters of long-distance reflexives. Linguistic Inquiry 1–22.
- Cole, Peter & Son, Min-Jeong. 2004. The argument structure of verbs with the suffix -kan in Indonesian. Oceanic Linguistics 43(2). 339–364.
- Cole, Peter & Hermon, Gabriella & Huang, C.-T. James. 2006. Long-distance binding in Asian languages. In Everaert, Martin & van Riemsdijk, Henk (eds.), The Blackwell companion to syntax, 21–84. Malden, MA: Blackwell. (doi:10.1002/9780470996591.ch39)
- Cole, Peter & Hermon, Gabriella & Yanti. 2015. Grammar of binding in the languages of the world: Innate or learned? Cognition 141. 138–160. (doi:10.1016/j.cognition.2015.04.005)
- McKinnon, Timothy & Cole, Peter & Hermon, Gabriella. 2011. Object agreement and “pro-drop” in Kerinci Malay. Language 87(4). 715–750.
