= Thomas Cole (cricketer) =

English cricketer

Personal information
- Full name: George Thomas Cole
- Born: 16 February 1846; Poplar, London, England
- Died: 6 December 1900 (aged 54); Islington, London, England
- Batting: Unknown

Career statistics
Competition	First-class
Matches	2
Runs scored	51
Batting average	13.75
100s/50s	–/–
Top score	21
Balls bowled	0
Wickets	–
Bowling average	–
5 wickets in innings	–
10 wickets in match	–
Best bowling	–
Catches/stumpings	-/-
- Source: Cricinfo, 23 December 2018

George Thomas Cole (16 February 1846 – 6 December 1900) was an English first-class cricketer.

Cole was born at Poplar in February 1846. He made two appearances in first-class cricket for the Surrey Club in 1873 against the Marylebone Cricket Club at Lord's and The Oval. He scored 55 runs in these two matches, with a highest score of 21. He died in December 1900 at Islington.
