= Maurice Cole =

Maurice Cole may refer to:

- Maurice Cole (cricketer) (1901–1971), South African cricketer
- Maurice Cole (pianist) (1902–1990), English pianist, teacher and adjudicator
- Maurice Cole (surfboard designer), appears in the 2023 documentary feature You Should Have Been Here Yesterday
- Kenny Everett, English radio DJ and television comedian, birth name
