= Lior Cole =

American Jewish fashion model and science student

- Born: February 8, 2001 (age 25); Long Island, New York, U.S.
- Education: Cornell University
- Occupation: Model
- Modeling information
- Height: 1.83 m (6 ft 0 in)
- Hair color: Brown
- Eye color: Blue-hazel
- Agency: IMG Models (worldwide)

Lior Cole is an American fashion model. Outside of fashion, she studies artificial intelligence and has developed an app that combines the tenets of Judaism with technology.

== Early life and education ==
Cole was born in 2001, and grew up in Great Neck, New York on Long Island. She is of Jewish heritage, with an Israeli mother and an American Jewish father; she also has an older sister, Orli. Her name means "my light" in Hebrew. Cole attends Cornell University, studying Information Science and is slated to graduate in 2023, having taken a year off to balance her career endeavors.

== Career ==
Cole was discovered in Washington Square Park by fashion designer Batsheva Hay. She was then referred to IMG Models who signed her immediately. Her debut fashion show was for Proenza Schouler which she opened. She also walked for also walked for Hugo Boss, Loewe, and Marni in her first season.
