= G. Emerson Cole =

American radio and TV producer (1919–2012)

George Emerson Cole (January 5, 1919 – March 31, 2012) was an American radio, television, and special events producer/announcer pioneer whose weekly radio program "The Big Bands Are Back" ran for over 32 consecutive years in Pinehurst, North Carolina. It is said to be the longest-running big band radio program in history.

== College ==
After graduation from high school with honors in Peoria, Illinois in 1936 Cole entered Cornell University where he began his career in broadcasting by building and operating a wired college network station which has become the Cornell FM radio station. He was involved in the creation of the Intercollegiate Broadcasting System to help other universities build similar stations.

Cole was graduated from Cornell in 1941 with BAs In Mechanical Engineering and Business Administration. He joined the United States Navy on December 8, 1941.

== WWII ==
Emerson Cole joined the Navy the day after the Pearl Harbor invasion on December 8, 1941 and was sent to General Electric to work with their radar development programs until he was called up for active duty in 1944.

After Communication School at Harvard, Cole was sent to Melville, Rhode Island to train for PT boat duty. He sailed from San Francisco to the Philippines in 1944 to join the Pacific Task Force.

On the way to Balikpapan, Borneo the last invasion of WW II, Cole joined Squadron 10, the remainder of John F. Kennedy's PT-109 boat squadron, on PT-171.

On one of his 13 patrols the boat's radar malfunctioned and the operator was unable to get it back on the air. By coincidence it was the same General Electric model SO-2 that Emerson had helped to develop at General Electric and he was able to restore it in less than a minute.

During his tenure in the Navy Emerson Cole took many historic photographs and sketches of the people and places in Pacific wartime and some have found their way into private and public collections as valuable relics of life in the wartime Navy in the South Pacific.

At the end of the war, PT-171 with Lt.(jg). Emerson Cole as skipper patrolled the coast for holdouts with a Japanese prisoner on the bow of the boat who called out to the shoreline over a speaker saying "It is over, don't shoot!"

Surrender terms for the Dutch West Indies were signed on an Australian cruiser and then skipper Lt.(jg) Emerson Cole sailed PT-171 back to the Philippines where the boats were burned to the waterline while their crews awaited the trip home.

== Television ==
After the war, Cole became a television commercial writer, director, and producer at Benton & Bowles Advertising Agency working directly under Shepherd Mead, author of the best-selling book How to Succeed in Business Without Really Trying. Cole claims he was featured in chapter 7, which did not appear in the movie that was made from the book.

In those days television shows were produced live and some of the programs he worked on included The Colgate Comedy Hour, The Jackie Gleason Show, Life Begins At 80, Ford Star Time, Omnibus, Captain Video, and The Gale Storm Show.

== Civic ==
For 35 years Emerson Cole lived in Darien, Connecticut. While serving as president of the YMCA, which had no building, Cole found an opportunity to acquire property of 7.5 acres on Long Island Sound from an estate sale, and with community donations spearheaded the remodeling of existing structures into a state-of-the-art Darien Community YMCA facility that features a 6-lane swimming pool looking out to the sound. There is an underwater window for checking on divers.

Property and construction costs were paid off in only five years and a second campaign resulted in the addition of another pool, handball courts, and gymnasium that were also paid off in five years.

== Big band radio ==
Emerson Cole moved his family from Connecticut to Pinehurst, North Carolina and on February 24, 1980 began his epic series of broadcasts, "The Big Bands Are Back" on radio stations WIOZ and WIOZ-FM which he continued to produce and broadcast on a weekly basis until his death in 2012; a record for longevity which is without equal in known radio broadcast history.

Cole produced a four-hour radio documentary about the December 7, 1941 Pearl Harbor invasion which has been required listening for some Moore County, NC school children.

The Pearl Harbor special includes original recordings of famous speeches, and eclectic sketches such as a rare Armed Forces Network recording of Glenn Miller broadcasting to the German troops in what Mr. Cole called "terrible" German.
