= King Cole (disambiguation) =

King Cole is a figure of British folklore.

King Cole may also refer to:

- King Cole (baseball) (1886–1916), Major League Baseball pitcher
- Nat King Cole (1919–1965), pianist and singer
- Edmund William Cole (1827– 1899) American businessman
- "Old King Cole" (also known as "King Cole"), a British nursery song
  - Old King Cole (film), 1933 Disney cartoon, based on the song

== See also ==
- Cole (disambiguation)
