= Galusha Cole =

American music instructor (1837–1931)

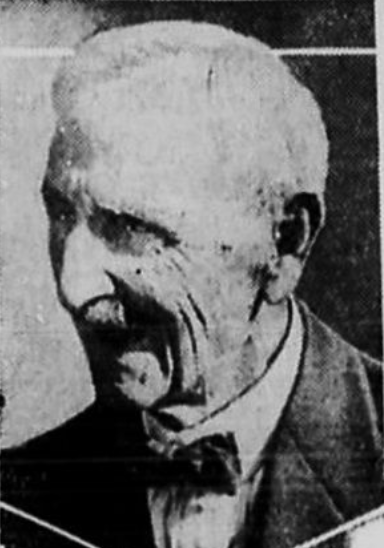
- Cole in 1929
- Born: Galusha Marion Cole; August 1837; Tolland County, Connecticut, U.S.
- Died: April 11, 1931 (aged 93); Pasadena, California, U.S.
- Political party: Whig (before 1856); Republican (after 1856)

Galusha Marion Cole (August 1837 (Note: Although he claimed to be born in 1826, the 1855 New York census lists him as 17 implying a birth year of either 1837 or 1838, and the 1900 federal census gives his birth date as August 1837.) – April 11, 1931) was an American music teacher, and was said to have been one of the oldest people to be captured on sound film, claiming to be 103 during a filmed interview in 1929.

== Early life and career ==
Galusha Marion Cole was born in August 1837, to a Baptist family, on a farm in Tolland County, Connecticut. He later moved to Upstate New York, where he would become a teacher of music, ultimately establishing that as his lifetime livelihood.

Years down the line he moved to Richmond, Indiana, living there for numerous years. His profession would eventually cause him to relocate to Missouri, where he taught at a normal school in Warrensburg. He did the same in Clinton, and would only move to California in 1890.

== Later life and death ==
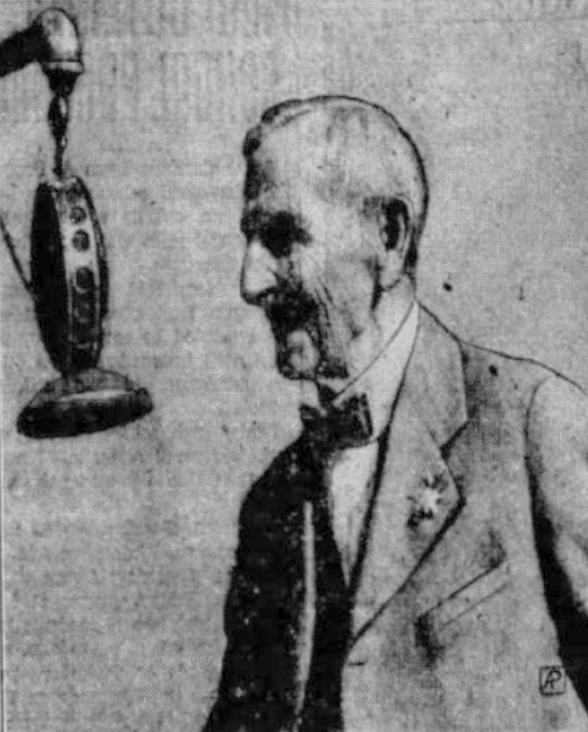
Cole signing on radio, 1928

By 1921, the time Cole reached his claimed 95th birthday (actually 84th), he had, in essence, gained recognition as a local celebrity in Southern California, being known as "Pasadena's Grand Old Man." In Pasadena, especially, city-wide celebrations were held in his honor at Pasadena Park, drawing thousands of attendees.

On his claimed 103rd birthday (actually 92nd) in 1929, he received well-wishes from many noteworthy individuals, including former U.S. Presidents William Howard Taft and Calvin Coolidge, along with other prominent figures such as industrialist Henry Ford, United States Secretary of the Treasury Andrew W. Mellon, California Governor James Rolph, and Connecticut Governor Wilbur Lucius Cross.

In that same year, on August 19, he was interviewed on sound film by 73-year-old C. R. Hodges. During the interview, he discussed various subjects, including his parents, early life, career, education, political views, and personal habits, noting that he was a Republican and had previously been a Whig. He also attributed his longevity to obedience and his avoidance of smoking and drinking.

On April 7, 1931, Cole broke his thigh following a fall, while his housekeeper was absent. Prior to this accident, he was said to have been very active and in good health. Although his doctor urged him to eat and take his medication, Cole refused, compelling the medical staff to administer treatment through injections and artificial feeding. When questioned about Cole's refusal, the doctor chose not to provide an explanation.

Consequently, on April 11, he died in a hospital in Pasadena, at the claimed age of 104 (actually 93).
