= Gabriel Cole =

Gabriel Cole may refer to:

- Gabriel Cole (Medal of Honor) (1831–1907), Union Army soldier and Medal of Honor recipient
- Gabriel Cole (athlete) (born 1992), Australian athlete
