= Joanna Cole =

Joanna or Joanne Cole may refer to:

- Joanna Cole (author) (1944–2020), American writer of children's books
- Joanna Cole (politician) (born 1948), American politician
- Joanne Cole (1934–1985), British artist and illustrator

== See also ==
- Joanna Coles (born 1962), British editor
- Joanne Coles (born 1992), English motorcycle racer
