= Douglas Cole (historian) =

American-Canadian historian

Douglas Cole

Douglas Lowell Cole (9 December 1938 – 18 August 1997) was an American-Canadian historian. Cole specialized in the art and culture of the Northwest Pacific Coast, and from 1966 until 1997 served as a professor in the history department at Simon Fraser University.

== Biography ==
Douglas Cole was born at Coulee Dam, Washington. His father was a construction worker and labor union activist. His mother taught elementary school. In 1960 Cole earned his bachelor's degree from Whitman College, in 1962 his master's degree from George Washington University, and in 1968 his doctorate from the University of Washington. In 1966 he moved to Canada and began teaching history at Simon Fraser University near Vancouver, British Columbia, where he ultimately became Chair of the History Department from 1978 to 1980 and President of the Faculty Association from 1986 to 1988.

As a student, Canada was the focus of both Cole's master's thesis (The United States and Canadian Diplomatic Independence, 1918-1926) and his doctoral dissertation (John S. Ewart and the Canadian Nation). He originally specialized in diplomatic and political history, but later became fascinated by the cultural history of the Northwest Pacific coast. Cole was among the first scholars to write on the history of art, literature, and intellectual thought in settler society. He also wrote seminal, often highly critical, studies of the impact of European values and institutions on the indigenous cultures of the Pacific Northwest coast that are widely acknowledged as exemplary texts for their painstaking research, clarity of exposition, and provocative insights. Cole died suddenly from heart failure while gardening in his North Vancouver home.

Cole's best known publications were Captured Heritage: The Scramble for Northwest Coast Artifacts, which dealt with the acquisition, sometimes unscrupulously, of Northwest Coast native art by world-renowned museums, An Iron Hand Upon the People: The Law Against the Potlatch on the Northwest Coast [with Ira Chaikin], a study of the legislation outlawing the traditional native giving away ceremonies, and Franz Boas: The Early Years, perhaps the first in-depth biography examining the development, influences, and early struggles of the man commonly referred to as the father of modern anthropology.

In 1971 Cole married Canadian historian Maria Tippett, who also specialized in the history, culture, and art of British Columbia. Together they authored the 1977 book From Desolation to Splendour, and that same year co-edited a collection of writings by Walter J. Phillips entitled Phillips in Print. They divorced in 1983. Cole later married Christine Mullins.

Cole's papers are held at the Simon Fraser University archives as the Doug Cole fonds.

== Works ==
=== Author ===
- The United States and Canadian Diplomatic Independence, 1918-1926 (M.A. thesis, 1962)
- John S. Ewart and the Canadian Nation (Ph.D. thesis, 1966)
- From Desolation to Splendour: Changing Perceptions of the British Columbia Landscape (1977) [with Maria Tippett]
- Captured Heritage: The Scramble for Northwest Coast Artifacts (1985)
- An Iron Hand upon the People: The Law against the Potlatch on the Northwest Coast (1990) [with Ira Chaikin]
- Franz Boas: The Early Years, 1856-1906 (1998)

=== Editor ===
- Phillips in Print: The Selected Writings of Walter J. Phillips on Canadian Nature and Art (1977) [with Maria Tippett]
- The Journals of George M. Dawson: British Columbia, 1875-1878 (1989) [with Bradley Lockner]
- To the Charlottes : George Dawson's 1878 Survey of the Queen Charlotte Islands (1993) [with Bradley Lockner]
- At Home with the Bella Coola Indians: T.F. McIlwraith's Field Letters, 1922-4 (2003) [with John Barker]
