= William Owen Cole =

British religious scholar

- Born: 22 September 1931; Sheffield
- Died: 26 October 2013 (aged 82)

Academic background
- Education: Durham University

William Owen Cole (22 September 1931 - 26 October 2013), was a British scholar in religious studies, including Sikhism, Christianity, Hinduism, Judaism, and Buddhism.

== Early life and education ==
William Owen Cole was born in 1931 in Sheffield. His father was a Congregational minister. Cole completed his early education in Bradford and Newcastle. He graduated from Durham University with a BA in History in 1954, and earned a Diploma of Education the year after. He later served the Friends' Ambulance Unit, where he became acquainted with Quakers.

== Career ==
Cole worked with Eleanor Nesbitt, and authored several works with Sikh scholar Piara Singh Sambhi. He was a lecturer at West Sussex Institute of Higher Education

== Death ==
Cole died on 26 October 2013.

== Selected publications ==
- The Sikhs : their religious beliefs and practices. New Delhi: New Delhi : Vikas Pub. House ; Queens Village, N.Y. : Distributed by Asia Book Corp. of America. 1978. (Co-author)
- The Guru in Sikhism. London: Darton, Longman & Todd. 1982. ISBN 978-0-232-51509-1.
- Sikhism and Its Indian Context 1469–1708 (1984)
