= Judge Cole =

Judge Cole may refer to:

- Douglas R. Cole (born 1964), judge of the United States District Court for the Southern District of Ohio
- Luther F. Cole (1925–2013), judge of the 19th Judicial District Court of Louisiana
- Marvin Frederick Cole (1922–2005), judge of the Court of Appeals of Virginia
- R. Guy Cole Jr. (born 1951), judge of the United States Court of Appeals for the Sixth Circuit
- William Purington Cole Jr. (1889–1957), judge of the United States Customs Court and associate judge of the United States Court of Customs and Patent Appeals

== See also ==
- Justice Cole (disambiguation)
