= Christopher Cole =

Christopher Cole may refer to:

- Christopher Okoro Cole (1921–1990), president of Sierra Leone, 1971
- Christopher Cole (Royal Navy officer) (1770–1836), British Royal Navy officer and politician

== See also ==
- Chris Cole (disambiguation)
