= Roy Cole =

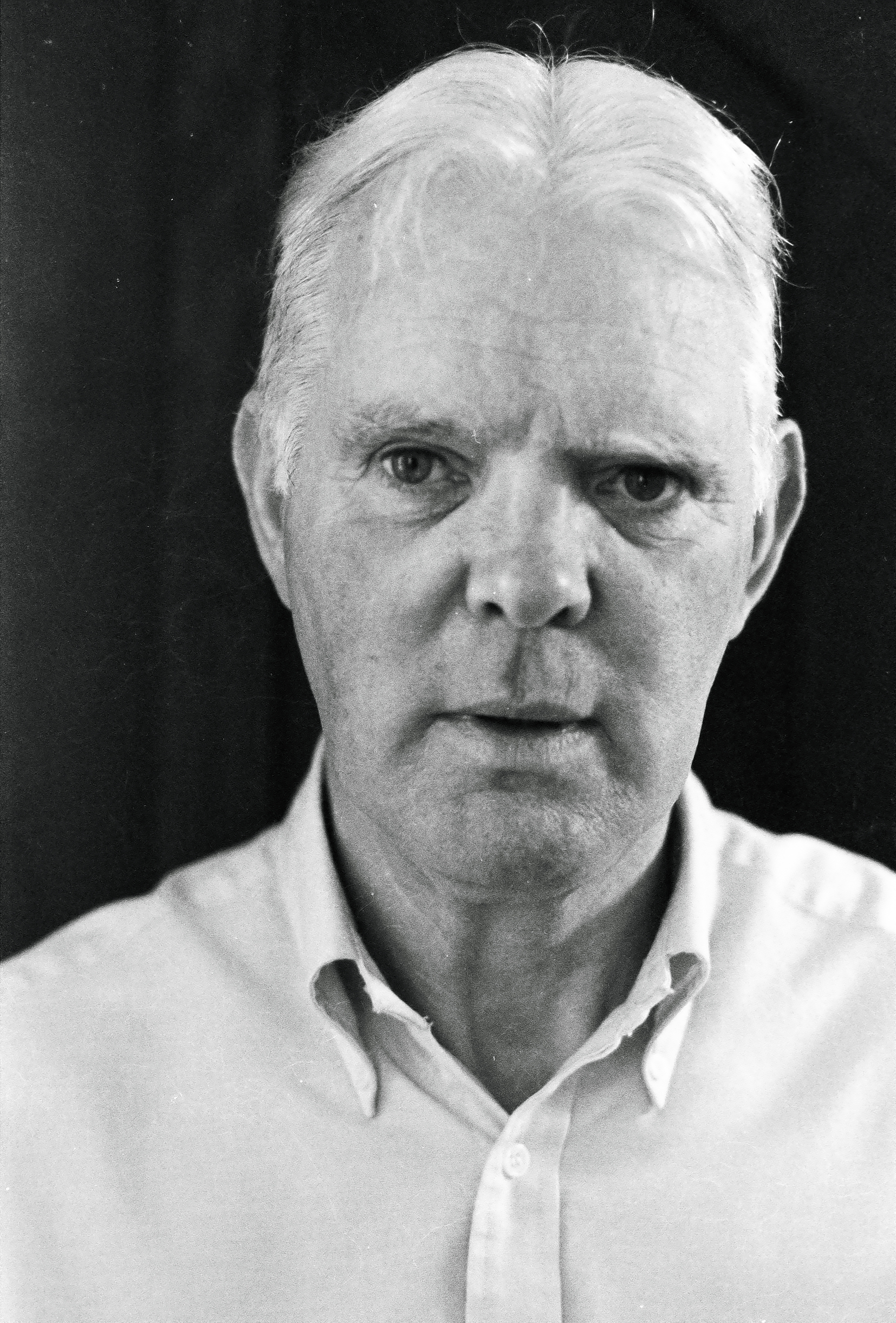
- Roy Cole in 1992
- Born: 1932
- Died: 2012 (aged 79–80)
- Occupation: Type designer
- Organization: Roy Cole typography

Roy Cole (1932–2012) was a type designer. His introduction to type began at the age of fourteen with an apprenticeship in the composing room of a printers in Idle, Bradford. This was followed by several years working as a journeyman compositor in the UK and in Switzerland. In 1960 he attended the typography course at the Allgemeine Gewerbeschule Basel, in Switzerland, under Emil Ruder's tutelage. In 1961 he married Maria Zenz from Austria, who he had met in Basel. There followed several years working as a salaried typographer, both at home and overseas, and he also served as an assessor for the Society of Typographic Designers' student assessments in the late 1970s–early 1980s. In 1981 he became a freelance book designer for, amongst others, Philip Wilson Publishers, the Ashmolean Museum and the Bodleian Library. Then, in 1990, he was invited as foreign guest juror for Stiftung Buchkunst's Best German book design competition. In 2003 he formed Roy Cole typography, a type foundry based in Wells, England, dedicated to exploring and developing type families in the sans serif style.

== Type families designed by Roy Cole ==
- Lina 2003 (six styles)
- Zeta 2006 (six styles)
- Colophon 2009 (six styles)
- Coleface 2012 (six styles)
