= Max Cole =

Max Cole may refer to:

- Max Cole (filmmaker) (born 1937), American filmmaker
- Max Cole (footballer) (1941–2018), Australian rules footballer
- Max Cole (rugby league) (1951–2018), Australian rugby league footballer
