= Warren Cole =

Warren Cole may refer to:

- Warren Cole (rower) (1940–2019), New Zealand rower
- Warren A. Cole (1889–1968), American businessman
- Warren Henry Cole (1898–1990), American surgeon
