= Terence Cole =

Terence Cole or Terry Cole may refer to:

- Terence Cole (cricketer) (1877–1944), English cricketer
- Terence Cole (jurist) (born 1937), Australian jurist
- Terry Cole-Whittaker (1939–2024), minister who founded an independent New Thought church in San Diego, California
- Terry Cole (American football) (1945–2005), American football player
- Terry Cole (law enforcement official) (born 1969), American law enforcement official and administrator of the Drug Enforcement Administration
- 6447 Terrycole, minor planet named for Terry Cole, chief technologist at the Jet Propulsion Laboratory
