= Jack Cole (scientist) =

Professor at the University of St. Andrews

- Born: Alfred Jack Cole; 1925
- Died: May 30, 1997 (aged 71–72)
- Monuments: Jack Cole Building, University of St Andrews
- Education: University College, London
- Known for: Invention of murray polygons, Distinguished Lecture Series, University of St Andrews

Alfred Jack Cole (1925 – May 30, 1997) was a professor at the School of Computer Science, University of St. Andrews in Scotland. He is credited with building on the establishing of the School of Computer Science at St Andrews.

== Career ==
Cole studied mathematics at University College London, completing his PhD on the theory of numbers in 1952. He then worked as a lecturer at Heriot-Watt College in Edinburgh until 1956, when he moved to Queen's College, Dundee. His interest in the potential of computer technology resulted in a move to University of Leicester in 1962, as Director of the Computing Laboratory. In 1965 he returned to Scotland and St Andrews, as Director of the Computing Laboratory and Reader in Computational Science.

From 1965 Cole devoted his next twenty years to establishing computer science at St Andrews. His innovative approach included pioneering the teaching of Information Technology to Arts students. He developed techniques for space-filling curves to be used in video compression, leading to his invention of murray polygons. One applied use of murray polygons is the halftoning of rectangular images without using dithering or edge enhancement methods.

He initiated the Distinguished Lecture Series in 1969. This series kept costs lower than similar conferences, with the intention of exposing students and others to leading edge topics. Costs were reduced through industry sponsorship and support from the university's School of Computer Science.

== Jack Cole Building ==
To recognize his service, the school moved to the new Jack Cole Building in 2004. This was formally opened on 1 July 2005.

== Personal life ==
Cole's interests included cats, hill walking, home brewing, folk music (and concertina playing), golf, gardening and football. He was a supporter of East Fife F.C.

== Selected publications ==
- "The preparation of examination time-tables using a small-store computer", 1964
- "Plane and Stereographic Projections of Convex Polyhedra from Minimal Information", 1966
- "A note on peano polygons and gray codes", 1985
- "Direct transformations between sets of integers and hilbert polygons", 1986
- "Compaction Techniques for Raster Scan Graphics using Space-filling Curves", 1987
