= C. Vernon Cole =

American soil scientist (1922–2013)

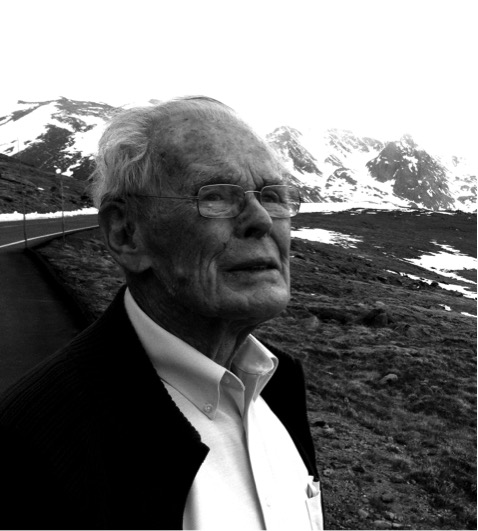
- Born: November 12, 1922; Wenatchee, Washington, United States
- Died: August 30, 2013 (aged 90); Estes Park, CO, US
- Education: University of Massachusetts Amherst (B.S., M.S.) and University of Wisconsin–Madison (Ph.D.)
- Known for: pioneering ecosystem modeling
- Scientific career
- Fields: Soil science, chemistry, ecosystem modeling
- Workplaces: Colorado State University and Agricultural Research Service

C. Vernon Cole (November 12, 1922 – August 30, 2013) was an American soil scientist known primarily for his work on nutrient cycling in agroecosystems. He was a member of Working Group II of the Intergovernmental Panel on Climate Change (IPCC) Second Assessment report, and the lead author of Chapter 23 “Agricultural Options for Mitigation of Greenhouse Gas Emissions”. The IPCC was awarded the Nobel Peace Prize in 2007.

== Biography ==
Cole was born in Wenatchee, Washington to Frederick and Olive Cole. He was raised and educated in Stow, Massachusetts. He served as a member of the US Army in WWII in the Philippines and Japan. After the war, he obtained his B.S. in Chemistry (1947) and in M.S. in Agronomy (1948) from the University of Massachusetts, Amherst. Cole then went to Madison, Wisconsin and earned his Ph.D. in Soil Science from the University of Wisconsin, Madison, in 1950. Soon after, Cole settled in Fort Collins, Colorado, where he worked jointly for the Natural Resource Ecology Laboratory at Colorado State University and the Agricultural Research Service (USDA). He retired in 1993 and moved to Estes Park, CO.

== Scientific work ==
Acknowledgement of C. Vernon Cole's contribution to the IPCC when it won the Nobel Peace Prize in 2007.

Cole was a soil scientist specializing in soil chemistry, especially phosphorus cycling. He conducted research at the Natural Resource Ecology Laboratory at Colorado State University and Agricultural Research Service (USDA) from 1950 to 1993. During this time, he contributed significant advances in the knowledge of phosphorus chemistry, including a method for extracting phosphorus from soil that has been adopted worldwide and cited over 5,000 times.

His research expanded into plant responses to phosphorus and broader studies of phosphorus cycling in relation to organic carbon and nitrogen transformations. He was the principal investigator on two major interdisciplinary projects, entitled “Organic Matter and Nutrient Cycling in Semiarid Agroecosystems” (1979–1985) and “Organic C, N, S and P Formation and Loss from Great Plains Agroecosystems” (1985–1989). These two projects were major undertakings that were at the forefront of ecosystem science (which was only just beginning to develop as a field of research) because they integrated ecological and pedological principles, and employed scientists from the two disciplines. This work led to significant advances in understanding management impacts on nutrient cycling and long-term productivity in agroecosystems. It paved the way for collaborative research in ecosystem science.

Around the same time, Cole and his colleagues were pioneering the development of ecosystem models to understand and predict plant nutrient dynamics in the soil and ecosystem. At the time, modeling was not widely used for this purpose. Still, the idea gained traction over the 1980s and 90s, and modeling is now a standard tool in ecosystem science.

Cole was a leader in the international scientific community. He was highly involved in the Scientific Committee on Problems of the Environment (SCOPE), serving as a member of the Scientific Advisory Committee on Biogeochemical Cycles and as the chairman of the International Phosphorus Project. As part of that work, he organized four regional workshops on Phosphorus Cycling that brought together 240 scientists from 51 countries. These occurred in Europe, Asia, South America, and Africa, culminating in a final synthesis workshop in Budapest in 1993.

After his retirement in 1993, Cole continued his research contributions through publications and working with students and colleagues.

== Key publications ==
- Cole, C.V., and M.L. Jackson. 1950. Colloidal dihydroxy dihydrogen phosphates of aluminum and iron with crystalline character established by electron and x-ray diffraction. J. Phys. Colloid Chem. 54:128-142.
- Cole, C.V., G.S. Innis, and J.W.B. Stewart. 1977. Simulation of phosphorus cycling in semiarid grasslands. Ecology 58(1):1-15.
- Cole, C.V., E.T. Elliott, H.W. Hunt, and D.C. Coleman. 1978. Trophic interactions in soils as they affect energy and nutrient dynamics. V. Phosphorus transformations. Microb. Ecol. 4:381-387.
- McGill, W.B. and C.V. Cole. 1981. Comparative aspects of organic C, N, S, and P cycling through soil organic matter during pedogenesis. Geoderma 26:267-286.
- Cole, C. V. and R. L. Sanford, Jr. 1989. Biological aspects of the phosphorus cycle. In H. Tiessen (ed.) Phosphorus Cycles in Terrestrial and Aquatic Ecosystems. Regional Workshop 1: Europe, Saskatchewan Institute of Pedology, University of Saskatchewan, Saskatoon, Canada.
- Cole, C.V., and R.D. Heil. 1981. Phosphorus effects on terrestrial nitrogen cycling. In: F.E. Clark, and T. Rosswall, (eds.). Terrestrial nitrogen cycles. Ecol. Bull. (Stockholm) 33:363-374.
- Cole, C.V., J. Hanson, and S.W. Running. 1983. State of the art in applications of ecological models to land resources. pp. 987–988 in: Lauenroth, W.K., G.V. Skogerboe, and M. Flug (eds.). Analysis of ecological systems: State-of-the-art in ecological modeling. Elsevier Scientific Publishing Company, Amsterdam, the Netherlands.
- Metherell, A. K., C. V. Cole, W. J. Parton. 1993. Dynamics and interactions of carbon, nitrogen, phosphorus and sulphur cycling in grazed pastures. Pages 1420–1421 in Proceedings of the XVII International Grassland Congress.
- Cole, C.V., C. Cerri, K. Minami, A. Mosier, N. Rosenberg and P. Sauerbeck. 1995. Agricultural options for mitigation of greenhouse gas emissions. Chapter 23 in: IPCC Climate Change 1995: Impacts, Adaptations, and Mitigation. Working Group II to the Second Assessment Report.
- Cole, C.V., J. Duxbury, J. Freney, O. Heinemeyer, K. Minami, A. Mosier, K. Paustian, N. Rosenberg, N. Sampson, D. Sauerbeck, and Q. Zhao. 1997. Global estimates of potential mitigation of greenhouse gas emissions by agriculture. Nutrient Cycling in Agroecosystems 49:221-228.
