= Ian Cole (disambiguation) =

Ian Cole (born 1989) is an American ice hockey player.

Ian Cole may also refer to:

- Ian Cole (karateka), English karateka
- Ian Cole (politician) (born 1947), Australian politician
