= Benjamin Cole =

Benjamin Cole is the name of:

- Benjamin Cole (instrument maker) (1695–1766), English surveyor, mapmaker, instrument maker, engraver and bookbinder
- Benjamín Cole (1919–1993), Puerto Rican mayor
- Benjamin Cole House, historic house in Swansea, Massachusetts
