= Martin Cole =

Martin Cole may refer to:

- Martin Cole (sexologist) (1931–2015), British sexologist
- Martin Cole (actor), British actor
- Martin Cole (MP) for Sudbury (UK Parliament constituency)
