= Anthony Cole =

Anthony Cole may refer to:

- Anthony Cole (MP) for Kingston upon Hull (UK Parliament constituency)
- Anthony Cole (actor) in Gone in 60 Seconds (1974 film)
- Anthony Cole, musician in JJ Grey & MOFRO
- Tony Cole (born 1947), thirteenth Secretary of the Australian Government Department of the Treasury
