= Rebecca Cole =

Rebecca or Bec Cole may refer to:

- Beccy Cole, Australian musician
- Beck Cole, Australian filmmaker
- Rebecca Cole (physician), African-American doctor
- Rebecca Cole (basketball), Australian basketball player (also known as Bec)
- Rebecca Cole (musician), American musician
- Rebecca Cole (make-up artist), British make-up artist
