= Senator Cole (disambiguation) =

Cornelius Cole (1822–1924) was a U.S. Senator from California from 1867 to 1873. Senator Cole may also refer to:

- Albert M. Cole (1901–1994), Kansas State Senate
- Albert Cole (Massachusetts politician) (1904–1966), Massachusetts State Senate
- Bill Cole (West Virginia politician) (born 1956), West Virginia State Senate
- Dan H. Cole (1811–1881), New York State Senate
- Ernest E. Cole (1871–1949), New York State Senate
- Gordon E. Cole (1833–1890), Minnesota State Senate
- Harry A. Cole (1921–1999), Maryland State Senate
- Helen Cole (1922–2004), Oklahoma State Senate
- Samuel Cole (politician) (1856–1935), Massachusetts State Senate
- Tom Cole (born 1949), Oklahoma State Senate
