= Donald Cole (anthropologist) =

American anthropologist (born 1941)

Donald Powell Cole (also known as AbdAllah-Talib Donald Cole)

Donald Powell Cole (born March 21, 1941, in Bryan, Texas) is a noted anthropologist at the American University in Cairo. He joined the university in 1971. He is a member of the American Anthropological Association. Cole has studied Arab nomadic cultures, such as the Al Murrah, in his The Social and Economic Structure of the Āl Murrah: A Saudi Arabian Bedouin Tribe, his PhD dissertation at the University of California, Berkeley.

Cole, an American expat, currently resides in Cairo.

== Academic positions ==
- The American University in Cairo

Assistant Professor, 1971–73; 1974–75 Associate Professor, 1975–86 Professor, 1986 to 2007 Emeritus Professor, 2007 onward

- University of California, Berkeley

Acting Assistant Professor, Spring Quarter 1971 Visiting Assistant Professor, 1973–74

- The University of Chicago

Visiting Associate Professor, Winter and Spring Quarters 1976

- University of Texas, Austin

Visiting Associate Professor, Spring Semester 1983, plus several summer sessions Visiting Scholar, Center for Middle East Studies, Spring Semester 1987

- Georgetown University

Visiting Researcher, Center for Contemporary Arab Studies, Spring Semester 1995

== Books ==
Cole's most recent book: "Road to Islam: From Texas to Saudi Arabia and Egypt."

- Road to Islām: From Texas to Saudi Arabia and Egypt / Donald Powell Cole. Cairo: Al-Madinah Press, 2010.
- Bedouins of the Empty Quarter / Donald Powell Cole. New Jersey: Aldine Transaction, 2010. ISBN 978-0-202-36357-8
- Bedouin, settlers, and holiday makers : Egypt's changing northwest cast / Donald P. Cole, Soraya Altorki. 1998. ISBN 977-424-484-2
- Investors and Workers in the Western Desert of Egypt: An Exploratory Survey / Donald Powell Cole, Naiem A. Sherbiny and Nadia Makary Girgis. Cairo: Cairo Papers in Social Science, Volume 15, Monograph 3. 1992.
- Arabian oasis city : the transformation of ʻUnayzah / Soraya Altorki and Donald P. Cole. Austin : University of Texas Press, 1989. ISBN 0-292-78517-8
- Saudi Arabian Bedouin: An Assessment of their Needs / Donald Powell Cole and Saad Eddin Ibrahim. Cairo: Cairo Papers in Social Science, Volume 5, Monograph 1. 1978.
- Nomads of the nomads : the Āl Murrah Bedouin of the Empty Quarter / Donald Powell Cole. 1975 ISBN 0-202-01117-8 (hardcover), ISBN 0-202-01118-6 (paperback)

== Other published works ==
- 1971: "Al Murrah Bedouin: The 'Pure Ones' Rove Arabia’s Empty Sands". In Nomads of the World, 52–71. Washington, DC: The National Geographic Society.
- 1973: "Bedouin of the Oil Fields". Natural History LXXXII(9):94–103.
- 1973: "The Enmeshment of Nomads in Saudi Arabian Society: The Case of the Al Murrah". In Cynthia Nelson (ed.), The Desert and the Sown: Nomads in the Wider Society, 113–128. Berkeley: University of California, Institute of International Studies, Research Series, Number 21.
- 1980: "Pastoral Nomads in a Rapidly Changing Economy: The Case of Saudi Arabia". In Timothy Niblock (ed.), Social and Economic Development in the Arab Gulf, 106–121. London: Croom Helm.
- 1982: "Tribal and Non-Tribal Structures among the Bedouin of Saudi Arabia". Al-Abhath XXX:77–94.
- 1984: "Alliance and Descent in the Middle East and the 'Problem' of Patrilateral Parallel Cousin Marriage". In Akbar S. Ahmed and David M. Hart (eds), Islam in Tribal Societies: From the Atlas to the Indus, 169–186. London: Routledge and Kegan Paul.
- 1984: "Modern Egypt". Discovery 8(3):8-12. (Robert A. Fernea, co-author).
- 1985: "The Bedouin in a Changing World". Cairo Today 6(9):23–31.
- 1990: "Mujtama’a ma qabl an-naft fi al-jazirah al-‘arabiyyah: fawdah qabiliyyah am mujtama’a muraqab". Al-Mustaqbal al-‘arabi 11:41–53. (Soraya Altorki, co-author).
- 1992: "Was Arabia Tribal? A Reinterpretation of the Pre-Oil Society.” Journal of South Asian and Middle Eastern Studies XV(4):71-87.
- 1993: "Commerce et production dans le nord de l’Aarabie centrale: changement et development a 'Unayzah". In Riccardo Bocco, Ronald Jaubert and Francoise Metral (eds), Steppes d’Arabies: Etats, pasteurs, agriculture et commerçants: le devinir des zones seches, 247–265. Paris: Presses Universitaires de France; Geneva: Cahiers de L'I.U.E.D. (Soraya Altorki, co-author).
- 1994: "Private Sector Enterprises in Desert Development in Egypt". In Mohammed Atif Kishk (ed.), Land Reclamation and Development in Egypt, 401–414. Minia: Minia University Press.
- 1996: "Land Tenure, Bedouin, and Development in the Northwest Coast". In Sustainable Development in Egypt: Current and Emerging Challenges, 108–110. Cairo: The American University in Cairo, Office of Graduate Studies and Research.
- 1997: "Change in Saudi Arabia: A View from ‘Paris of Najd'". In Nicholas S. Hopkins and Saad Eddin Ibrahim (eds), Arab Society: Class, Gender, Power and Development, 29–52. Cairo: The American University in Cairo Press. (Soraya Altorki, co-author).
- 1997: "'Unayzah, le 'Paris du Najd': le changement en Arabie saoudite". Monde arabe: Maghreb-Machrek 156:3–22. (Soraya Altorki, co-author).
- 1998: "Guide to the MT09 Libyan Bedouin File". HRAF Collection of Ethnography, Installment 47 (CD-ROM). New Haven: Human Relations Area Files.
- 1998: "Agro-Pastoralism and Development in Egypt’s Northwest Coast". In Directions of Change in Rural Egypt, eds. Nicholas S. Hopkins and Kirsten Westergaard, 318-333. Cairo: The American University in Cairo Press. (Soraya Altorki, co-author).
- 1998: "The Northwest Coast: A Part of Rural Egypt?” In Nicholas S. Hopkins and Kirsten Westergaard (eds), Directions of Change in Rural Egypt, 130–143. Cairo: The American University in Cairo Press. (Soraya Altorki, co-author).
- 1998: "Twenty Years of Desert Development in Egypt". Cairo Papers in Social Science 21(4):44–54. (Soraya Altorki, co-author).
- 2000: "Production and Trade in North Central Arabia: Change and Development in 'Unayzah". In Martha Mundy and Basim Musallam (eds), The Transformation of Nomadic Society in the Arab East, 145–159. Cambridge: Cambridge University Press.
- 2001: "Saudi Arabia". In Melvin Ember and Carol R. Ember (eds), Countries and their Cultures, 1927–1939. New York: Macmillan Reference.
- 2002: "Riyadh". Encyclopedia of Urban Cultures, eds. Melvin Ember and Carol R. Ember, 4:38–45. Danbury, CT: Grolier.
- 2003: "Where Have the Bedouin Gone?" Anthropological Quarterly 76(2):235–267.
- 2005: "Al Murrah Tribes in the Days of King 'Abd al-'Aziz".
- 2006: "New Homes, New Occupations, New Pastoralism: Al Murrah Bedouin, 1968–2003". In Dawn Chatty (ed.), Nomadic Societies in the Middle East and North Africa: Entering the 21st Century, 370–392. Leiden and Boston: Brill.
- 2006: "Land and Identity among Awlad 'Ali Bedouin: Egypt's Northwest Coast". In Dawn Chatty (ed.), Nomadic Societies in the Middle East and North Africa: Entering the 21st Century, 634–653. Leiden and Boston: Brill. (Soraya Altorki, co-author).

== Published academic interviews ==
- 2000 Mark Allen Peterson. “The Long Walk II: ‘For as long as I can remember Anthropology has been reinventing itself’: An interview with Donald Powell Cole.” Nomadic Peoples 4(2):7-20.
- 2002 Hussein Fahim. “Hadith anthrubulujiya maa duktur Donald Cole” [Anthropological discussion with Dr. Donald Cole]. Journal of the Social Sciences. Kuwait: Kuwait University, Fall 2002.
