= Stacey Cole =

British beach volleyball player

Personal information
- Born: December 19, 1982 (age 43); Sutton, England, Britain
- Height: 5 ft 11 in (1.80 m)
- Weight: 160 lb (73 kg)

Volleyball information
- Position: Outside hitter
- Current team: V.V.C.-Vught

Career
Teams
	Waterdown District High School; University of Louisiana at Lafayette; Chicago State University

Stacey Cole (born 19 December 1982; Sutton, England) is a volleyball player, playing for V.V.C.-Vught in the Dutch first division in the Netherlands.

== Career ==
As of January 2009, Cole lives in the Netherlands and plays for V.V.C.-Vught in the Dutch first division.

Cole played beach volleyball Cairns league in Australia from 2005 to 2008. She finished first in the Far North Queensland Region and also winning the regional indoor competition.

Cole played one season (summer 2005) in the AVP circuit:

- Ft Lauderdale, FL
- Austin, TX
- Hermosa Beach, CA
- Manhattan Beach, CA
- Santa Barbara, CA
- Chicago, IL

Cole played final two seasons (2003–04) of collegiate career at Chicago State University (NCCA Division I). In 2003, she played 28 matches and 92 games played, with a record of 402 kills, 1081 total attacks, 1.76 percentage, 21 assists, 68 services aces, 254 digs. She placed in the top 16 in NCAA division I for number of services aces in 2003. She was elected to the First Team All Conference within the Mid-Continent Conference for both 2003-2004. She recorded individual season highs of kills (28 v. Western Illinois), attacks (3 games; 46 v. IUPUI, 4 games; 66 v. Western Illinois, 5 games; 60 v. UMKC), Digs (14 v. Oral Roberts), Aces (4 games, 6 v. Western Illinois; 5 games, 6 v. UMKC).

"The biggest threat from Chicago State that Western will face is going to be the ever-powerful Stacey Cole. She was recently named Offensive Player Of the Week for the third week in a row. She is currently averaging 5.92 kills per game and was named to the First All-Conference Team in 2003." (McKay, September 24, 2004)

As a freshman at the University of Louisiana at Lafayette Sun Belt Conference, Cole played in 90 games, 25 matches, 258 kills, 2.87 percentage, 43 service aces. She led the team in ATTACK (by ##) G K K/Game E TA Pct—1 COLE, Stacey 90 258 2.87 139 691 .172.

She competed 3 years (2003–2005) in Team Ontario and won silver in the Canada Games in 2001.
