= Norman Cole =

Norman Cole may refer to:

- Norman Cole (politician) (1909–1979), British Conservative and National Liberal Member of Parliament
- Norman Cole (footballer) (1913–1976), English footballer with several clubs, including Southampton and Norwich City
