= Chris Cole =

Chris Cole may refer to:

- Chris Cole (skateboarder) (born 1982), professional skateboarder
- Chris Cole (wide receiver) (born 1977), American football player
- Chris Cole (soccer) (born 1995), American soccer player
- Christina Cole (born 1982), also known as Chris Cole, English actress
- Chris Cole, the main character in the 2001 film Rock Star, played by Mark Wahlberg
- Chris Cole (linebacker) (born 2005), American football player

== See also ==
- Christopher Cole (disambiguation)
