= Tom Cole (umpire) =

Australian cricket umpire (1844–1924)

Nicholas "Tom" Cole (12 July 1844 – 27 January 1924), sometimes known as T. N. Cole, was an umpire who officiated in one Test match in Australia in 1884.

Cole was born in Australia. He was a left-arm round-arm bowler who was the first exponent of round-arm bowling in Adelaide. He was the first bowler in Adelaide cricket to take ten wickets in an innings. He played senior club cricket in Adelaide and represented South Australia in several matches in the 1870s. He took nine wickets in the match against W. G. Grace's English team in 1873-74. The opening round of matches in the Adelaide competition in the 1881-82 season was held in his benefit.

His sole Test match as umpire was the First Ashes Test played between Australia and England at the Adelaide Oval in December 1884, when the Australian captain Billy Murdoch refused to accept the experienced English player and administrator James Lillywhite as umpire. This was also the only Test match umpired by fellow Australian umpire Isaac Fisher.

A timeless Test, the match lasted four days, starting on 12 December and ending on 16 December, with 14 December as a rest day. Despite the batting prowess of Australia's Percy McDonnell (124 and 83 out of Australia's totals of 243 and 191), England won by 8 wickets, with Bobby Peel taking 8 wickets in the match (3/68 and 5/51) and Billy Bates 5/51 in Australia's first innings. The Australian side had been weakened by the absence of Fred Spofforth and Billy Midwinter; George Giffen played despite suffering from rheumatism, and Alec Bannerman damaged his finger attempting to stop a ball in the field and was absent hurt in the Australian second innings.

Cole was still umpiring in Adelaide senior cricket in the 1890s. He worked as a bootmaker in Adelaide. He died at his home in Adelaide aged 79.

== See also ==
- List of Test umpires
