= Edwin Louis Cole =

Founder of the Christian Men's Network (1922-2002)

Edwin Louis Cole (1922–2002), also known as Ed Cole, was the founder of the Christian Men's Network, an American religious organization devoted to helping Christian men and fathers. He published many books and preached numerous sermons relating to men and religion.

== Early life ==
After his birth in Dallas, Cole lived with his mother in Texas until the age of four, when he became ill with a severe case of scarlet fever. After being told that he would not survive without sea air and sun, his mother Florence moved to Los Angeles, California, with young Edwin.

Cole was educated at Belmont High School in Downtown Los Angeles.

In Los Angeles, Edwin played an active role in the Angelus Temple of Aimee Semple McPherson, often participating in the Temple's illustrated sermons. He played a trumpet with street corner witnessing teams on Los Angeles's skid row.

He enlisted in the United States Coast Guard during World War II, where he met his wife, fellow Coast Guard member Nancy Corbett. Later Cole began street witnessing again, and within two years accepted the pastorate of a church in northern California.

== Religious career ==
Cole eventually became a full-time district men's minister. He spent the next two decades undertaking a number of religious endeavors, including mission trips, evangelizing, and Christian TV stations. In 1977 Cole founded the Christian Men's Network. At that time he was still actively ministering on two Christian television networks, acting as chancellor of a ministry school, and helping to establish a radio ministry. In April 1984 Cole resigned from these positions to focus exclusively on his men's ministry, which started slowly but grew in the 1980s and 1990s.

"Dr. Cole was ordained in the Assemblies of God and received his doctorate as a correspondence student from the New Covenant International University in New Zealand."

== Later life ==
In 1993 Cole and his wife, Nancy, moved back to Texas to continue ministering. Nancy died of cancer in 2000. In 2002 he was diagnosed with cancer while being treated for a broken back. He collapsed on August 25, 2002, and was taken to a nearby hospital in critical condition. He died on August 27, 2002, and was buried at a private ceremony in Newport Beach, California.

== Quotes ==
An exhaustive complete listing of all 940 "Coleisms", their scriptural references, and additional information, is at The Ed Cole Library "Coleism" Section. Citations needed, this link is now dead.

- "Manhood and Christlikeness are synonymous."
- "Have faith in God; God has faith in you."
- "Being a male is a matter of birth. Being a man is a matter of choice." Ben Kinchelow
- "Teach to teach to teach." / "Teach to teach, 'til every man is taught."
- "Christians are not patched-up sinners, they are new creations."
- "You don't drown by falling in the water; you drown by staying there."
- "Do not let others create your world for you, for they will always create it too small."
