= Philip Cole =

Philip Cole is a professor in the Department of Biological Chemistry and Molecular Pharmacology at Harvard Medical School. He previously was a professor and director of the Department of Pharmacology and Molecular Sciences at the Johns Hopkins School of Medicine until 2017. He obtained his BA summa cum laude from Yale University in 1984 and his MD from Johns Hopkins in 1991. His research includes investigation of hormonal control of gene regulation, and circadian rhythm, and post-translation protein modifications such as methylation and acetylation.

h-index: 83 Affiliation: Harvard University Citations: 26 940 Spouse: Rhoda Myra Alani (m. 1997) Marriage location: Temple Beth Sholom, East Hills, New York, United States Education: Yale University, Johns Hopkins University
