= Billy Cole (footballer) =

Australian rules footballer, born 1909

Personal information
- Full name: Billy Cole
- Born: 9 August 1909
- Died: 24 August 1958 (aged 49)
- Original team: Northcote
- Height: 170 cm (5 ft 7 in)
- Weight: 68 kg (150 lb)
- Position: Wing / Half Forward

Playing career^{1}
| Years | Club | Games (Goals) |
| 1935–37 | St Kilda | 29 (19) |
- ^{1} Playing statistics correct to the end of 1937.

Billy Cole (9 August 1909 – 24 August 1958) was an Australian rules footballer who played with St Kilda in the Victorian Football League (VFL).

Cole began his senior career in the Victorian Football Association with the Northcote Football Club, where he played 101 games. He then joined VFL club St Kilda in 1935, and played 29 games in three years.
