= Thomas F. Cole (general) =

United States Army general

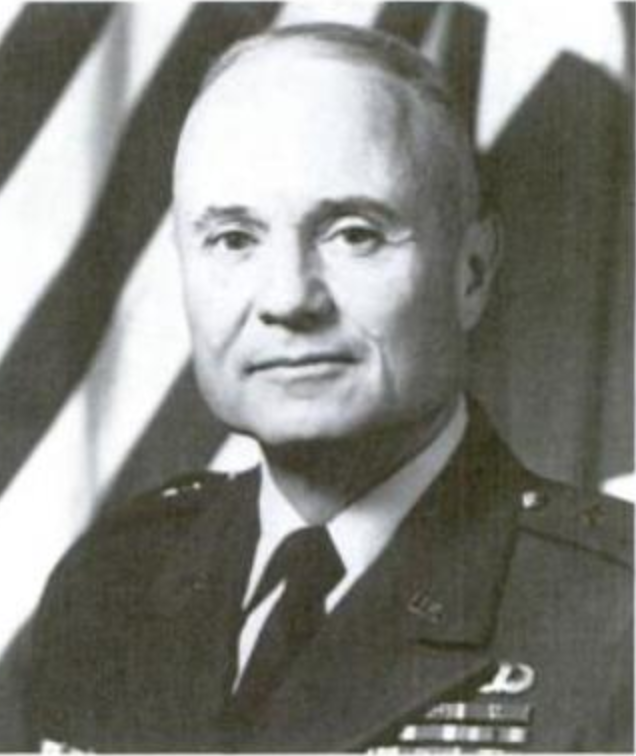
- Born: 17 November 1928 (age 97); Los Angeles, California U.S.
- Military career
- Allegiance: United States
- Branch: United States Army
- Service years: 1952–1988
- Rank: Major general
- Commands: Readiness Region NINE; Deputy Commanding General, Sixth United States Army

Thomas Frederick Cole (born 17 November 1928) is a retired major general in the United States Army who served as Deputy Commanding General of Sixth United States Army from 1984 to 1988. He was commissioned upon graduation from the United States Military Academy in 1952.
