= Derham Cole =

American politician

Member of the South Carolina House of Representatives from the 32nd district
- In office 2009 – November 12, 2018

Personal details
- Born: March 12, 1977 (age 49) Columbia, South Carolina, United States
- Party: Republican

J. Derham Cole (born March 12, 1977) is an American politician. He was a member of the South Carolina House of Representatives from the 32nd District, serving from 2009 to 2018. He is a member of the Republican party.
