= Steven Cole (tenor) =

American opera singer (born 1949)

Steven Cole (born 1949) is an American opera singer. He is particularly known for his portrayal of tenor character roles in an international career spanning more than 30 years. He sang in the world premieres of Jean Prodromides's La Noche Triste, Gavin Bryars's Medea, and the revised version of György Ligeti's Le Grand Macabre.

== Life and career ==
Cole was born in Baltimore, Maryland. He studied sociology and anthropology at Union College and singing at the Peabody Conservatory and at the Royal College of Music, Stockholm. After graduating from Union College in 1971, he was awarded a Watson Fellowship and pursued further vocal training in England. He made his professional debut as Monsieur Triquet in Eugene Onegin at the Tanglewood Festival in 1974 in a Boston Symphony Orchestra performance conducted by Seiji Ozawa. Cole went on to sing in major opera houses and festivals across North America and Europe, including the Metropolitan Opera, San Francisco Opera, Paris Opera, Gran Teatre del Liceu, and the Salzburg Festival. His discography includes Orphée aux enfers conducted by Marc Minkowski, Le Grand Macabre conducted by Esa-Pekka Salonen, The Magic Flute conducted by William Christie, and The Rake's Progress conducted by Kent Nagano.

== Repertoire ==
Cole's wide-ranging repertoire spans operas from the Baroque era to the 20th century. His roles from 1974 to the present have included:

- Absalom Kumalo in Lost in the Stars
- Aguilar in Jean Prodromidès's La noche triste (world premiere, Théâtre des Champs-Élysées, 1989)
- Alceo in Antonio Cesti's L'Argia
- Andrès, Frantz, Pitichinaccio, and Spalanzani in The Tales of Hoffmann
- Antonio in Les brigands
- Creon in Gavin Bryars's Medea (world premiere, Opéra de Lyon, 1984).
- Dancing Master in Ariadne auf Naxos
- Don Basilio in The Marriage of Figaro
- Elder Gleaton in Susannah
- Flute in A Midsummer Night's Dream
- Fool in Wozzeck
- Goro in Madama Butterfly
- John Styx in Orphée aux enfers
- Lilaque, père in Boulevard Solitude
- Linfea in La Calisto
- Ménélas in La belle Hélène
- Monostatos in The Magic Flute
- Monsieur Triquet in Eugene Onegin
- Nick in La fanciulla del West
- Oberon in Oberon
- Osmin in L'incontro improvviso
- Pedrillo in The Abduction From the Seraglio.
- Pisandro in Il ritorno d'Ulisse in patria
- Remendado in Carmen
- Rodisbe in Antonio Sartorio's Giulio Cesare in Egitto
- Scrivener in Khovanshchina
- Sellem in The Rake's Progress
- Simpleton in Boris Godunov
- Sobrinin in A Life for the Tsar
- Spoletta in Tosca
- Sportin' Life in Porgy and Bess
- Squeak in Billy Budd
- Teapot, Frog, and Little Old Man in L'enfant et les sortilèges.
- White Minister in Le Grand Macabre (world premiere of the revised version, Salzburg Festival, 1997)
- Witch in Hansel and Gretel
