= Frederick Cole (cricketer) =

English cricketer (1852–1941)

Personal information
- Born: 4 October 1852; Patricroft, Lancashire
- Died: 1 July 1941 (aged 88); Sheffield, Yorkshire
- Batting: Right-handed

Domestic team information
- Years: Team
- 1879-1890: Gloucestershire
- Source: Cricinfo, 1 April 2014

Frederick Cole (4 October 1852 – 1 July 1941) was an English cricketer. He played for Gloucestershire between 1879 and 1890.
