= Doug Cole =

English footballer

Personal information
- Full name: George Douglas Cole
- Date of birth: 2 July 1916
- Place of birth: Heswall, England
- Date of death: 30 January 1959 (aged 42)
- Place of death: Stannington, England
- Position: Defender

Senior career*
Years	Team	Apps	(Gls)
1946–1948	Chester	20	(0)
- * Club domestic league appearances and goals

Doug Cole (2 July 1916 – 30 January 1959) was an English footballer, who played as a defender in the Football League for Chester.
