= R. Beverly Cole =

American physician (1829–1901)

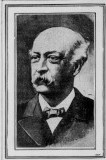
- Born: August 12, 1829; Manchester, Virginia
- Died: January 15, 1901 (aged 71); San Francisco
- Education: Jefferson Medical College
- Known for: AMA presidency, 1895-96
- Scientific career
- Fields: Obstetrics
- Workplaces: The Medical Department of the University of California

Richard Beverly Cole (August 12, 1829 – January 15, 1901) was an American physician and past president of the American Medical Association (AMA). He was dean of the Toland Medical College during the time that it merged with the University of California system (it was later known as University of California, San Francisco). A surgeon and obstetrician-gynecologist, Cole was among the first to perform some of the newer surgical procedures of his era, such as the Caesarean section and ligation of the common carotid and femoral arteries.

== Early life ==
Cole was born in Manchester, Virginia, and his family moved to Philadelphia when he was a child. He attended the Delaware Collegiate Institute and he began to study under a Kentucky physician when he was 16. He attended medical school at Transylvania University before transferring to Jefferson Medical College, from which he graduated in 1849. That year, there was a cholera outbreak in Philadelphia, and the 20-year-old Cole was placed in charge of the Pine Street Cholera Hospital.

== Career ==
In 1852, Cole moved to San Francisco. He had already become a noted obstetrician and surgeon, having performed three Caesarean sections in Philadelphia when that procedure was in its infancy. After the shooting of Cole's friend, San Francisco newspaper editor James King of William, Cole stayed with King and was one of several physicians who tended to his wounds. At one point, a decision was made to insert a sponge into King's chest, and this approach was supported by prominent surgeon Hugh Toland. Cole disagreed with the decision and provided testimony to that effect when the San Francisco Committee of Vigilance called for an investigation into the man's medical care after his death.

Cole became a dean of the medical school at the University of the Pacific in 1859. The school closed within two years, and Cole spent most of the American Civil War period in Europe, where he toured hospitals in several countries. When he returned to the US in 1865, most of the former University of the Pacific faculty members were working at Toland Medical College, which had been established by Cole's rival. In 1867, he joined the Outside Lands Committee of the San Francisco Board of Supervisors; the group interested city leaders in the land that became the Golden Gate Park.

As Cole gained prominence, the rift between Cole and Toland eased. Cole was named dean of the Toland Medical College in 1870. He served in that capacity for ten years and he remained on the faculty for nearly the rest of his life. Cole assisted in the negotiations when Toland Medical College merged with the state's public university system in 1873. The college became known as the Medical Department of the University of California, then after his death, as the University of California, San Francisco. By 1880, Cole was the first vice president of the AMA. He presided over much of the organization's business that year owing to the illness of president Lewis Sayre. He was a council member of the American Surgical Association in 1882.

In 1890, Cole registered his opposition to antiseptic injections in obstetrics before the obstetric committee of the Medical Society of the State of California, reasoning that deliveries had long been accomplished before the introduction of antisepsis. He was an advocate for the practice of inserting alum into the vagina for the treatment of uterine hemorrhage.

== Personal ==
Cole was married to the former Eugenia Bonaffon. They had five children, three of whom died in infancy. Cole was an active Freemason, earning the degree of Knight Kadosh.

== Later life ==
In his late sixties, Cole suffered a stroke which left him with partial facial paralysis and changes in his speech. In 1900, he retired as chair of obstetrics and gynecology at the medical school. Upon his retirement, his students and faculty colleagues presented him with an engraved silver plate; an obituary in the San Francisco Call said that he considered the silver plate to be his most special possession. Cole was serving as a coroner when he died of another stroke in 1901.
