= John Cole =

John Cole may refer to:

== Politics ==
- John Cole (fl. 1372–1394), MP for Wilton
- John Cole (born c.1376) (c. 1376–?), MP for Devon 1417–23
- Sir John Cole, 1st Baronet (died 1691), Irish politician
- John Cole, 1st Baron Mountflorence (1709–1767), Irish politician
- John Cole, 2nd Earl of Enniskillen (1768–1840), Irish peer and Member of Parliament
- John Lowry Cole (1813–1882), Irish Conservative politician
- John N. Cole (1863–1922), U.S. politician in the Massachusetts House of Representatives
- John James Cole (died 1959), Irish independent politician from Cavan
- John Copeland Cole (died 1987), Irish politician, Senator from 1957 to 1969
- John Cole (Canadian politician) (born 1942), Canadian politician

== Sports ==
- John Cole (bobsleigh) (1929–1993), American bobsledder
- John Cole (cricketer, born 1907) (1907–1997), English cricketer and British Army officer
- John Cole (cricketer, born 1933) (1933–2014), South African cricketer
- John Cole (footballer) (born 1941), Scottish footballer
- John Cole (American football), American football fullback
- John Cole (rugby union) (born 1946), Australian rugby union player

== Other ==
- John Cole (priest), Archdeacon of Totnes between 1580 and 1583
- John Cole (pirate) (died 1718), known more for the unusual cargo of his pirate ship than for his piracy
- John Cole (judge) (1715–1777), Chief Justice of the Rhode Island Supreme Court from 1764 to 1765
- John Cole (academic) (1758–1819), Anglican priest and administrator at the University of Oxford
- John Cole (music publisher) (1774–1855), American composer, music publisher, collector of sacred music
- John Cole (antiquary) (1792–1848), English bookseller, publisher and antiquary
- John Jenkins Cole (1815–1897), English architect
- John Cole (architect), Northern Irish architect
- Tom Cole (farmer) (John Thomas Cole, 1854–1927), Australian dairy farmer and cattle breeder
- John Cole (journalist) (1927–2013), Northern Irish journalist and broadcaster, BBC political editor
- John Cole (geographer) (1928–2020), Australian-born British geography professor
- John Y. Cole (born 1940), librarian and historian of the Library of Congress
- John Cole (choreographer) (born 1988), Zimbabwean dance choreographer, dancer, actor, TV presenter and artists director
- John Cole (photographer) (1923–1995), English fashion and advertising photographer
- John T. Cole (1895–1975), United States Army general
- John B. Cole, American quantitative geneticist and animal scientist

== See also ==
- Jack Cole (disambiguation)
- Jack Coles (disambiguation)
- John Coles (disambiguation)
- Jon Cole (disambiguation)
- Jonathan Cole (disambiguation)
