= USSC =

USSC may refer to:

== Government ==
- United States Supreme Court, the highest federal court of the United States
- United States Sentencing Commission, an agency responsible for stating the sentencing guidelines for the United States federal courts
- Utah Seismic Safety Commission, a legislatively created independent advisory board
- United States Security Coordinator — see United States security assistance to the Palestinian National Authority
- Unified social security contributions — see taxation in Ukraine

== Military ==
- United States Sanitary Commission, a relief agency that supported injured soldiers of the U.S. Army during the American Civil War
- A unified combatant command of the U.S. Armed Forces:
  - United States Southern Command (usually abbreviated "USSOUTHCOM" or "SOUTHCOM")
  - United States Space Command (usually abbreviated "USSPACECOM" or "SPACECOM")
  - United States Strategic Command (usually abbreviated "USSTRATCOM" or "STRATCOM")
- United States Army Signal Corps (usually abbreviated "USASC")
- (fictional) United States Spacecraft — see Discovery (Space Odyssey spaceship)

== Sports ==
- US Sports Camps, headquartered in San Rafael, California
- Uppingham School Sports Centre
- United States Shidōkan Championships — see Shonie Carter § Karate
- Union Sportive et Sporting Club — see tooltips in League of Oran Football Association, Algeria
- Union Sportschützen Club — see citation in 1976 IPSC Handgun World Shoot and Jan Foss

== Industry ==
- United States Steel Corporation, a Japanese-owned company based in Pittsburgh, Pennsylvania
- United States Surgical Corporation, a former manufacturer of medical devices
- United States Shipbuilding Company, a short-lived trust made up of seven shipbuilding companies, a property owner and steel company, 1902
- USSC, short for U.S. Sugar Corporation, and the reporting mark of the U.S. Sugar Railroad — see South Central Florida Express
- Union Steam Ship Company of New Zealand Limited (1875–2000)
- Universal Storefront Services Corporation — see Jeannie Sandoval

== Other uses ==
- United States Studies Centre, a non-profit organization headquartered at University of Sydney
- University of Surrey Space Centre — see SARAL § Secondary payloads
- US-SC, the ISO 3166 code for South Carolina

== See also ==
- USC (disambiguation)
- USCC (disambiguation)
- US (disambiguation)
- SC (disambiguation)

=== Articles that could in theory be abbreviated "USSC" ===
- Umpqua State Scenic Corridor, a Oregon state park in Douglas County
- United St Saviour's Charity, Southwark, London, England
- University of Sydney School of Chemistry

==== Government ====
- Under-Secretary of State for the Colonies, a junior ministerial post in the United Kingdom government
- United States Court of Appeals for the {Second/Sixth/Seventh} Circuit (normally abbreviated "2d Cir.", "6th Cir.", and "7th Cir.", respectively)
- United States Secretary of Commerce (normally abbreviated "SecCom")
- United States Semiquincentennial Commission, a congressionally appointed body
- United States Senate Caucus on International Narcotics Control
- United States Senate chamber
- United States Senate Committee

==== Military ====
- (most or all are United States Ships)

==== Sports ====
- Ulster Schoolgirls' Senior Cup (field hockey)
- Umm Salal SC (Sport Club) (Arabic: نادي أم صلال الرياضي), a Qatari professional football (soccer) team
- "Unione Sportiva"s, Italian association football (soccer) teams
  - US Sassuolo Calcio, Sassuolo, Emilia-Romagna
  - US Sestese Calcio, Sesto Calende, Lombardy
- Uxendon Shooting School Club, Preston, England

==== Industry ====
- United States Shoe Corporation (normally abbreviated "U.S. Shoe"), a retailing conglomerate headquartered in Cincinnati, Ohio
- United States Stove Company, a manufacturer based in South Pittsburg, Tennessee
- U.S. Summit Company, an American corporation that advises on Asian industrial chemicals and consumer goods
