= Jon Cole =

Jon Cole may refer to:

- Jon Cole (businessman), Texas businessman and anti-drug leader
- Jon Cole (weightlifter) (1943–2013), American powerlifter, weightlifter and strongman
- Jon Cole of The Movies (band)
- Jon Cole of Psyopus (band)
- Jon Cole of Quill (band)
- Jonathan Cole (British Army officer) (born 1967), British general

== See also ==
- Jonathan Cole (disambiguation)
- John Cole (disambiguation)
