= Bring Light =

Bring Light, Inc.
- Company type: Private
- Founded: Cupertino, California, USA (November 14, 2006)
- Headquarters: Cupertino, California, USA
- Key people: Melissa Dyrdahl, CEO; Drew McManus, President
- Website: www.bringlight.com

Bring Light, Inc. is an American company that runs an online web service which helps charities reach new donors and raise funds. It is also a social network for donors to find charitable projects to support and to help those donors make a bigger difference by getting others involved. Bring Light is now a part of Rally.org.

== Origins ==
Bring Light was founded in November 2006 by two former executives of Adobe Systems, Inc. Melissa Dyrdahl was previously Senior Vice President of Corporate Marketing and Communications. Drew McManus was Director of Corporate Product Management. They co-founded Bring Light out of a desire to help non-profits better market themselves.

The site opened to beta testers in early May 2007. The service officially launched at the Netsquared Conference in San Jose, California on May 29, 2007.

== Services ==
Bring Light's customers include both charities and the donors that support them.

=== Charities ===
Unlike many other charitable giving services, Bring Light does not rely on the Guidestar database. All charities on the Bring Light website have been individually screened after completing an application to establish presence on the site. Charities have access to a special Charity Resource Center with tools to manage their fundraising and to interact with donors on the site.

=== Projects ===
Rather than giving to a charity's general fund, donors can direct how their dollars are used by giving to a specific project.

=== Giving Groups ===
Donors can form Giving Groups to sponsor specific charities or projects. Giving Groups can track their donations to see the aggregated results of their giving.

=== Donor Accounts ===
Through a partnership with the American Endowment Foundation, Bring Light delivers the benefits of a donor advised fund to donors who might not otherwise qualify. This enables donors to deposit funds for later donation while getting the immediate tax benefit. Most donor advised funds have minimum deposit requirements of $10,000 or more, while Bring Light's minimum is only $5.

== Business model ==
Bring Light charges charities a service fee for their use of the site for fundraising. There are no upfront fees, but charities pay based on the amount of funds raised. The service fee is determined on a sliding scale, with the largest service fee being 10% of funds raised.

== Funding ==
Bring Light was initially self-funded by the co-founders. Later, they took on several angel investors, including Ron Conway and Bruce Chizen. The company remains privately held.

== Recognition ==
Melissa Dyrdahl and Drew McManus are featured in the book We Are the New Radicals: A Manifesto for Reinventing Yourself and Saving the World, by Julia Moulden.

== Acquisition ==
Bring light was acquired and is now a part of Rally.org, an online social fundraising platform that lets users connect and raise money for great causes.
