= Dyrdahl =

Dyrdahl is a surname that may refer to

- Arnold Dyrdahl (1919–1973), Norwegian bobsledder athlete
- Bjørn Dyrdahl (born 1949), Norwegian luger athlete
- Bryan Dyrdahl, American snowmobile racer athlete
- Joachim Dyrdahl, Norwegian disc jockey and record producer, whose stage name is Diskjokke
- Melissa Dyrdahl (born 1957), chief executive officer of Bring Light, based in Cupertino, California
