= Melissa Dyrdahl =

Melissa Dyrdahl is a fellow at Stanford's Distinguished Careers Institute since 2018.

== Career ==
In the early 1980s, Dyrdahl started her career working for a small ad agency.

Dyrdahl conceived, designed and launched Bring Light, to connect donors and charities for more informed and effective online fundraising. Bring Light was acquired in 2011 by Rally.org.

Dyrdahl was the President and chief executive officer of Ella Health, a woman's health provider based in San Francisco, CA but expanded nationally.

== Nonprofit, Volunteer, and Honorary Positions ==
Dyrdahl was the chair of the board of directors for the Humane Society Silicon Valley.

== Awards and honors ==
In May 2004, Dyrdahl was named "Best Marketing Executive" by the American Business Awards. She is also a recipient of the YWCA Tribute to Women in Industry award and is an active mentor, was named one of San Jose's Distinguished Women in Business, and was named one of the "2010 Women of Influence" in Silicon Valley

Dyrdahl is used extensively as an example of a "New Radical" in Julia Moulden's book 'We Are the New Radicals: A Manifesto for Reinventing Yourself and Saving the World'.

In 2013, Dyrdahl was inducted into the East Side Union High School District Education Foundation Thomas P. Ryan Hall of Fame established to honor the outstanding achievements of graduates of East Side Union High School. Other inductees include Yahoo Founder Jerry Yang, U.S. Congressman Mike Honda, and former NFL quarterback Jim Plunkett.
