= Jack Cole =

Jack Cole may refer to:

- Jack Cole (artist) (1914–1958), American comic book artist and cartoonist
- Jack Cole (businessman) (1920–2007), American entrepreneur and businessman
- Jack Cole (choreographer) (1911–1974), American dancer, choreographer and theatre director
- Jack Cole (scientist) (1925–1997), professor at the School of Computer Science, University of St. Andrews, Scotland
- Jack A. Cole (born 1938), retired detective and executive director of Law Enforcement Action Partnership
- Jack Isadore Cole (1920–1997), co-founder of the Coles bookstore chain and Coles Notes
- Jack Cole, pseudonym of David Donachie (born 1944), Scottish nautical historical novelist
- Jack Cole (rugby league) (born 2003), Australian rugby league footballer

== See also ==
- Jack Coles (disambiguation)
- John Cole (disambiguation)
