= Jeff Leach (politician) =

Texas state legislator

- Leach in 2026

Member of the Texas House of Representatives from the 67th district
- Incumbent
- Assumed office January 8, 2013
- Preceded by: Jerry A. Madden

Personal details
- Born: June 10, 1982 (age 44) Plano, Texas, U.S.
- Party: Republican
- Spouse: Rebecca Swann Leach
- Children: 3
- Education: Baylor University (BS); Southern Methodist University (JD)
- Occupation: Lawyer
- Website: jeffleach.com

Jeffrey Curtis Leach (born June 10, 1982) is an American lawyer and politician who has served as the member of the Texas House of Representatives for the 67th district since 2013. A member of the Republican Party, his district covers a portion of Collin County. He was first elected in 2012, winning re-election five times.

== Early life and education ==
Leach was born in Plano, Texas, and graduated from Plano Senior High School. He attended Baylor University in Waco, Texas. During his time at Baylor, he served under George W. Bush in the White House Office of Political Affairs and with the Republican National Committee. Following graduation from Baylor, Leach earned his J.D. degree from SMU Dedman School of Law in Dallas and currently practices with Gray Reed in Dallas.

== Career ==
Leach first ran for the Texas House of Representatives for the 67th District in 2012, after incumbent Jerry Madden did not seek re-election. He went to a runoff in the Republican primary election with Jon Cole, winning the nomination in July 2012. Madded had defeated Cole in 2008 and endorsed Leach in the 2012 runoff. He went unchallenged in the November general election. He was re-elected to the House in 2014, defeating Libertarian Patrick Peavy in the general election. Leach won his third term in the House in 2016, going unopposed in the primary and defeating Democrat Scott Coleman in the general election.

In 2018, Leach won his fourth term in the House, defeating Democrat Sarah Depew in the general election. During his term in the 86th Texas Legislature, Leach was the lead author on a Texas constitutional amendment which prohibited the imposition of an individual income tax. The amendment passed both the House and Senate before being approved by three-quarters of voters in November 2019. The amendment raised the threshold for future income tax to two-thirds vote of both chambers plus a statewide referendum.

In 2020, Leach reached out to the president of Collin College over tweets from a professor that were critical of then-Vice President Mike Pence, asking the president if the professor was "paid with taxpayer dollars." The professor was fired nine days later but was offered a settlement in 2022 for violation of her First Amendment rights.

Leach was elected to his fifth term in the House in 2020, defeating Democrat Lorenzo Sanchez, despite Democratic presidential nominee Joe Biden carrying the district. His sixth term came in 2022, defeating Julia Schmoker in the Republican primary and going on to beat Democrat Kevin Morris in the general election with 50 percent of the vote.

In 2024, Leach faced a Republican primary challenge from Daren Meis, who was endorsed by Texas Attorney General Ken Paxton after Leach voted to impeach Paxton in the Texas House. Leach won the primary with 65 percent of the vote. He also had the endorsement of Governor Greg Abbott. In the November general election, he defeated Democratic nominee Makala Washington with about 60 percent of the vote. During his term, he sponsored legislation for judicial pay raises. The legislation passed in 2025, giving state judges a 25% pay increase.

Leach won the Republican primary for the House in 2026, defeating Matt Thorsen with approximately 64 percent of the vote. He advanced to the November general election against Democratic nominee Jordan Wheatley.

Texas House of Representatives
Preceded by Jerry A. Madden	Texas State Representative for District 67 (part of Collin County); 2013–	Succeeded by Incumbent
