= Grenville Cole =

British geologist

Grenville Cole FRS, FGS, MRIA
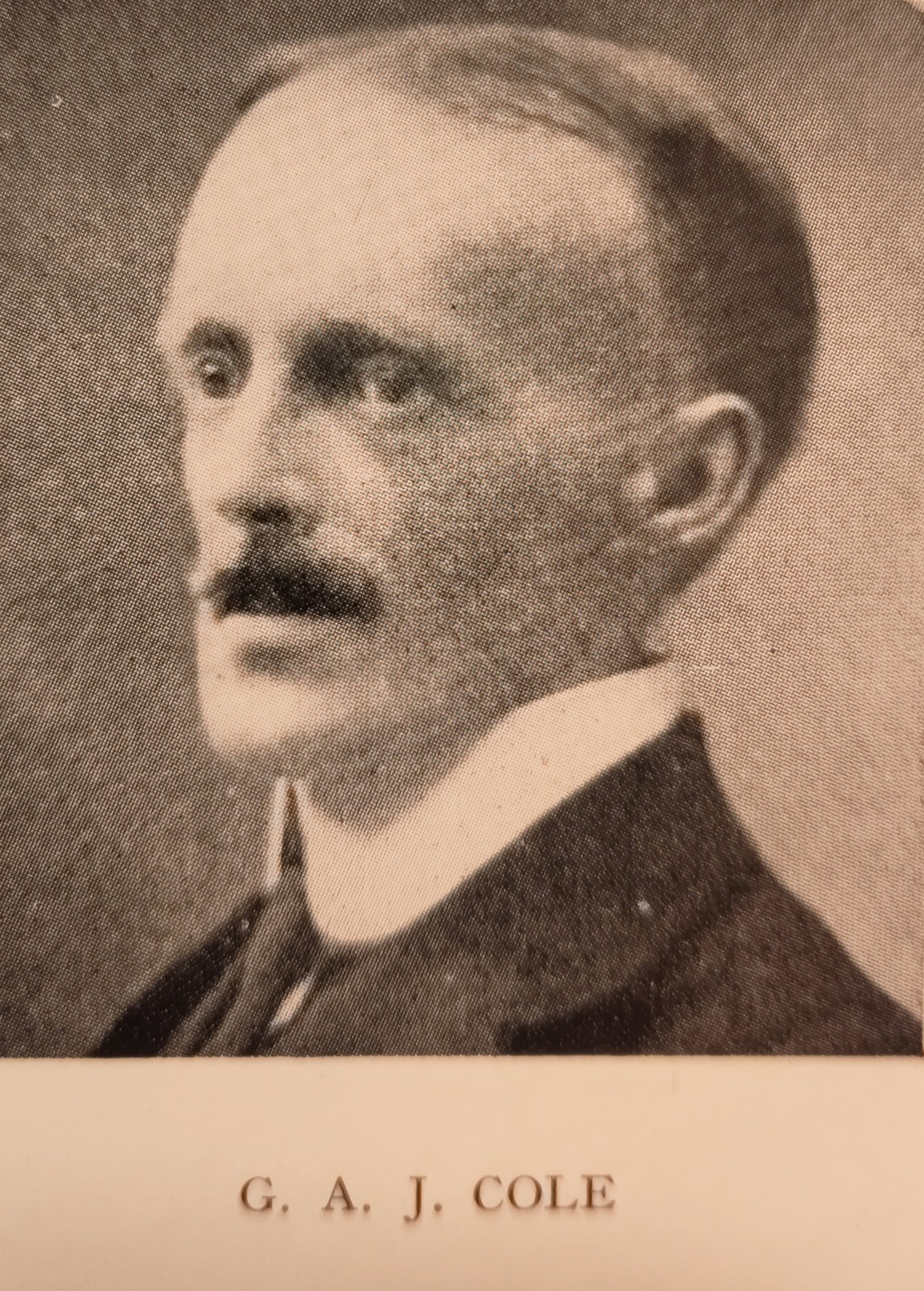
- Grenville Arthur James Cole
- Born: Grenville Arthur James Cole; 21 October 1859; London, England
- Died: 20 April 1924 (aged 64)
- Occupation: geologist
- Known for: supporting women in geological studies
- Spouse: Blanche Vernon
- Parents: John Jenkins Cole (father); Anna Maria Josephine Smith (mother)
- Awards: Fellow of the Royal Society

Grenville Arthur James Cole FRS, FGS, MRIA (21 October 1859 – 20 April 1924) was an English geologist. He was from 1890 the Professor of Geology and Mineralogy in the Royal College of Science for Ireland, and from 1905 he became the fifth Director of the Geological Survey of Ireland.

== Early life and family ==
Cole was born in London, and was the son of John Jenkins Cole (1815–1897) an architect, and Anna Maria Josephine Smith (c.1832-1903). He attended the City of London School and the Royal School of Mines, London, going on to become a demonstrator in geology from 1878 to 1890.

Cole married Blanche Vernon in 1896. Blanche's father was J. E. Vernon of Clontarf Castle. They had one son, Vernon. Blanche had been one of his students and she produced fine drawings of his thin section petrography, to illustrate his published papers. From 1896 to 1902, they lived at 3 Dartmouth Square, and later kept two houses, one at 10 Winton Road from 1902 to 1920, and Orohova (later Glenheather), Carrickmines 1902 to 1924. In later life, he suffered from rheumatoid arthritis. He died at his home in Carrickmines on 20 April 1924 and is buried in Dean's Grange Cemetery, Dublin.

== Career ==
Cole supported women in their geological studies, including by teaching at Bedford College, London between 1886 and 1890. From 1890 to 1924, he was professor of geology at Royal College of Science, Dublin. Mabel Crawford MacDowall was one of Cole's students at the Royal College of Science for Ireland. She married William Bourke Wright, a geologist. She then deployed her talents in the Geological Survey by studying fossils from the Leinster coalfield, and publishing a paper in 1920, under the directorship of Cole.

From 1905 to 1924, Cole served as the director of the Geological Survey of Ireland, during a time of limited resources. Despite that, the Survey produced a number of important publications such as maps on the geology of urban centres, and a memoir that recounted the location of valuable mines and deposits.

His research was wide-ranging, taking in "petrology, mineralogy, palaeontology, regional and offshore geology, structural geology, stratigraphy, and geography", producing 515 papers and 12 books. His Aids in practical geology (1890) ran to 7 editions. He also coauthored Handbook of the geology of Ireland (1925) with Timothy Hallissy. Cole valued field and practical work in the teaching of geology, and helped in the production of a texts for schools and popular reading on the subject including Ireland: the land and the landscape (1914) and Common stones (1921). Later in his career, he focused on the development of geography at university level.

He was elected a Member of the Royal Irish Academy in 1893, and a Fellow of the Royal Society in 1917. He served as president of the Dublin Naturalists' Field Club from 1896 to 1897, President of the Geographical Association in 1919, and the president of the Irish Geographical Society from 1918 to 1922. In 1909 he was awarded the Murchison Medal of the Geological Society of London and a D.Sc. from Queen's University Belfast. The geological museum in Trinity College Dublin holds some of his specimens.

Cole was a keen cyclist, and recounted his long-distance tours of Europe in two books: The gypsy road: a journey from Krakow to Coblentz (1894) and As we ride (1902). He also published poetry and was a photographer.

== Works ==
- The Gypsy road; a journey from Krakow to Coblentz (1894)
- Open-air studies in geology (1902)
- Aids in practical geology (nd) 5th ed. 1906
- The changeful earth; an introduction to the record of the rocks (1911)
- Outlines of mineralogy for geological students (1913)
- The growth of Europe (1914)
- Ireland, the outpost (1919)
- General guide to the natural history collections : description of the raised map of Ireland (1920)
- Rocks and Their Origins (1924)
- Common Stones – unconventional essays in geology (not dated, 1921 ?)
