= USSF =

USSF may refer to:

- United States Servicemen's Fund, a support organization for soldier and sailor resistance to the Vietnam War and the U.S. military
- United States Soccer Federation, governing body of soccer in the United States
- United States Social Forum, activist organization
- United States Space Force, the space service branch of the United States Armed Forces
- US Sumo Federation, governing body of sumo in the United States

== See also ==
- USSC (disambiguation)
- SF (disambiguation)
