= Ethna Byrne-Costigan =

- Born: Ethna Mary Byrne; 24 May 1904; Upper Leeson Street, Dublin
- Died: 12 January 1991 (aged 86); Palmerstown Villas, Rathmines, Dublin
- Spouse: George Costigan (m. 1941; died 1951)
- Children: 1

Ethna Byrne-Costigan (24 May 1904 – 12 January 1991) was an Irish academic and writer.

== Early life and family ==
Ethna Byrne-Costigan was born at Upper Leeson Street, Dublin on 24 May 1904. She was the eldest daughter of the chief architect to the Office of Public Works, Thomas Joseph Byrne and Mary Ellen Byrne (née Scott). In her youth, she was sent to Italy to live with relatives, attending Les Dames de Scion convent in Rome. When she returned to Dublin she lived alternately with her grandfather and aunts in Dartmouth Square, and in Ballyboden and later Rathgar with her parents. She was schooled at Loreto Hall in St Stephen's Green, going on to attend University College Dublin. In 1925 she graduated with a first class BA in modern languages, and in 1927 a first class MA in French. She went on to study for her doctorate at the Sorbonne in Paris with the thesis Bourdaloue moraliste, which was published by Beauchesne.

== Career ==
Byrne-Costigan was appointed professor of Romance languages at University College Cork (UCC) in 1939, after the retirement of Mary Ryan. She stayed in this position until 1969, establishing the Italian department and introducing a refresher course for French teachers. Her academic publications focused on studies of Le bourgeois gentilhomme by Molière, Athalie by Jean Racine, and Horace by Pierre Corneille. She translated My Prisons by Silvio Pellico into Irish, which is held by the Pellico Museum in Turin. Her Irish translation of a collection of Salvatore Quasimodo's poems was published by the Italian Institute. She founded the Dante Alighieri Society in Cork with Dr Piero Calì, serving as the president from 1956 to 1969.

She retired from UCC, taking up part-time lecturing at Trinity College Dublin on Italian philology and medieval texts. Byrne-Costigan was a member of the Irish national committee of UNESCO, and represented Ireland twice at the biennial UNESCO conference in Paris. She was also the honorary secretary of the Celtic Congress. In 1960 she was made a Grand Officer Order of Merit of the Italian Republic for her work on promoting Italian culture and the language in Ireland.

== Later life and legacy ==
Byrne-Costigan was a talented embroiderer, with her work exhibited as part of the Embroiderers' Guild in the United States. She married the Egyptologist and linguist George Costigan (died October 1951) in 1941, with whom she had one daughter, Celine (died 2015). She published her memoirs, Ethna Mary twice, under the pseudonym "Ethna Bee Cee" in 1989. She remained an active researcher, delivering a lecture to the Old Dublin Society on Sydney, Lady Morgan in 1984. She died at her home in Palmerstown Villas, Rathmines, Dublin on 12 January 1991.

UCC awards The Ethna Byrne Costigan Memorial Prize in her memory to a student who attains the highest marks in the second year examination in Italian. A collection of her papers is held in UCC Library's Archives. Items from her personal library of books are held in UCC Library's Special Collections.

== Works ==
- Etude sur l'Athalie de Racine. Cork: Cork University Press, 1958.
- Etude sur l'Horace de Corneille. Cork: Cork University Press, 1959.
- Etude sur l'Horace de Corneille, 2nd edition. Cork: Cork University Press, 1968.
- Peg Woffington. Dublin Historical Record 33.1 (1979): 11–21.
- Sydney Lady Morgan (1776-1859). Dublin Historical Record 38.2 (1985): 61–73.
- Ethna Mary twice. New York: Vantage Press, 1989.
- Costigan, E.B. and du Cameroun, F., 1989. Tribute to Doctor Fonlon. Socrates in Cameroon: The Life and Works of Bernard Nsokika Fonlon, 1, p.149.
