= USAF (disambiguation) =

USAF usually refers to the United States Air Force, the aerial warfare branch of the U.S. Armed Forces.

USAF may also refer to:

- United States Armed Forces itself, the military of the United States of America
- United Student Aid Funds, a nonprofit corporation that works to enhance postsecondary-education preparedness, access and success
- Upper Saint Anthony Falls, part of the Saint Anthony Falls
- Jane's USAF, a 1999 video game
- A common typo for UASF or "User Activated Soft Fork", a technique for updating Bitcoin and other blockchains

== See also ==
- USSF (disambiguation)
- U.S.A.A.F. - United States Army Air Force
