= Jack Coles (disambiguation) =

Jack Coles (1914–1991) was a British composer, arranger and conductor.

Jack Coles may also refer to:

- Jack Coles (footballer) (1886–1951), Australian rules footballer for the Richmond Tigers

== See also ==
- Jack Cole (disambiguation)
- John Cole (disambiguation)
