= Selden E. Marvin =

American businessman and militia officer from Albany, New York (1835–1899)

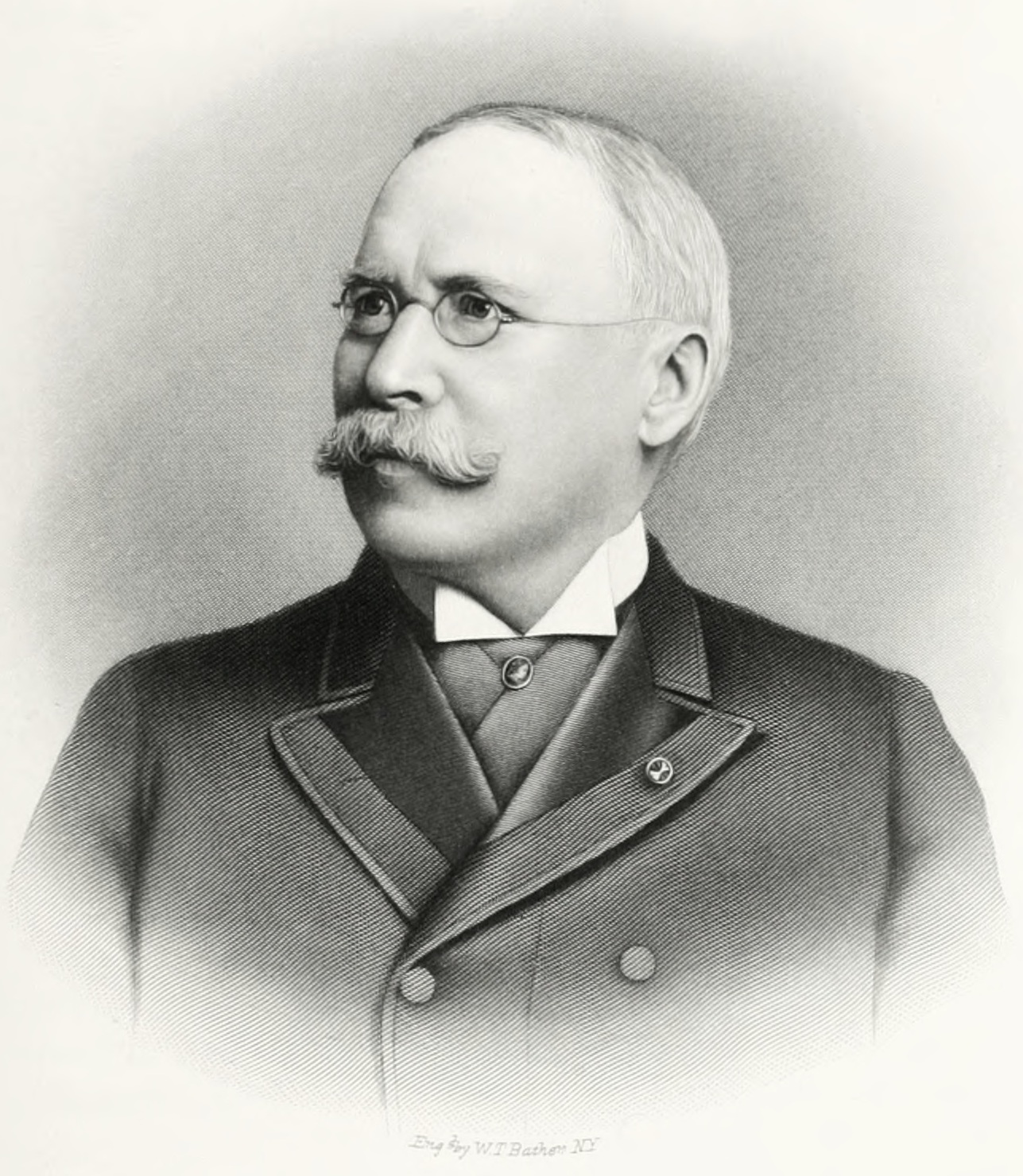
- From Volume III (1902) of New York State's Prominent and Progressive Men
- Born: 20 August 1835; Jamestown, New York, US
- Died: 19 January 1899 (aged 63); Albany, New York, US
- Burial place: Albany Rural Cemetery, Menands, New York, US
- Spouse: Katharine Langdon Parker (m. 1868–1899)
- Children: 6
- Relatives: Richard P. Marvin (father); William Marvin (uncle)
- Military career
- Allegiance: United States; Union (American Civil War)
- Service: Union Army; New York Militia
- Service years: 1862–1869
- Rank: Brigadier General
- Unit: US Army Infantry Branch
- Commands: Paymaster General of the New York Militia; Adjutant General of New York
- Wars: American Civil War
- Other work: Businessman

Signature
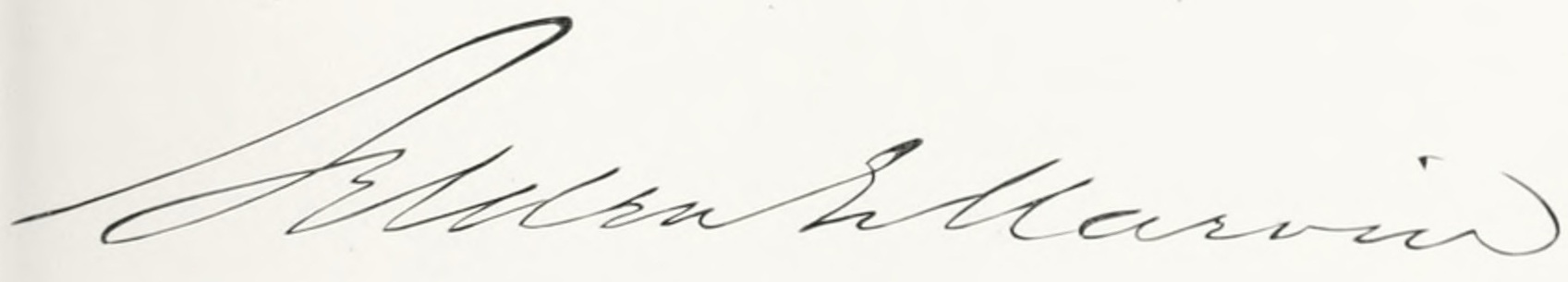

Selden E. Marvin (20 August 1835 – 19 January 1899) was an American businessman and militia officer from Albany, New York. A Union Army veteran of the American Civil War, he served as the New York Militia's paymaster-general from 1865 to 1867 and Adjutant General of New York from 1867 to 1869. In his civilian career, Marvin was a prominent businessman and banker.

== Early life ==
Selden Erastus Marvin was born in Jamestown, New York on 30 August 1835, a son of Richard Pratt Marvin and Isabella (Newland) Marvin. Among his four siblings was Mary Elizabeth Marvin (1841–1907), the wife of B. F. Goodrich Company founder Benjamin Goodrich. William Marvin, a prominent judge and politician in Florida, was his uncle. Marvin was educated in the public schools of Jamestown and Jamestown Academy, which was followed by attendance at Russell's Commercial and Collegiate Institute in New Haven, Connecticut. After completing his education, he became bookkeeper and teller at Jamestown's Chautauqua County Bank; he remained at the bank until 1862, and was the bank's cashier beginning in 1859.

In 1860, Marvin joined the New York Militia's 68th Regiment and was appointed a second lieutenant. He was subsequently appointed regimental quartermaster. In July 1862, he enlisted in the Union Army for the American Civil War and was appointed adjutant of the 112th New York Infantry Regiment with the rank of first lieutenant. He served with his regiment and as assistant adjutant of Robert Sanford Foster's brigade, and took part in the Peninsula campaign and Second Battle of Charleston Harbor. In September 1863, he was appointed additional paymaster of United States Volunteers with the rank of major and assigned to duty with the Army of the Potomac.

== Start of career ==
Marvin served with the Army of the Potomac until December 1864, when he resigned so he could return to New York and accept incoming governor Reuben Fenton's appointment as the state militia's paymaster general. In this position, Marvin supervised reimbursement to cities and towns of bounties they had paid recruits in order to fill enlistment quotas. In total, this effort required payment of and accounting for $27,000,000 (nearly $580 million in 2026), and at the end of the war, Marvin's oversight enabled the state to pay all claims and reconcile all accounts.

Fenton won reelection in 1866, and at the start of his term in January 1867 he appointed Marvin to succeed William Irvine as Adjutant General of New York. In this post, he carried out the militia's post-war reorganization and implemented a reform plan that placed the organization on the path to becoming the modern National Guard. While serving as paymaster-general and adjutant general, Marvin moved from Jamestown to Albany. Fenton left the governorship at the end of 1868, and Marvin was succeeded by Franklin Townsend.

== Continued career ==
After Marvin left the adjutant general's post, he moved to New York City, where he became a partner in the investment banking firm of Morgan, Keen & Marvin. In this position, he was responsible for placing the securities of the Northern Pacific Railway on the market, which enabled construction of a railroad from Minnesota to the Pacific Northwest. In January 1874, he moved to Troy to represent Erastus Corning Jr.'s partnership interest in the iron and steel business of John A. Griswold & Co. (Note: Marvin, Corning, and another partner in the iron business, John V. L. Pruyn, were brothers-in-law, all married to daughters of Amasa J. Parker.)

In March 1875, Marvin oversaw another reorganization of the Corning and Griswold businesses, which was called the Albany and Rensselaer Iron and Steel Company. Marvin was elected to the board of directors of the new company and served as its secretary and treasurer. In September 1885, this company was succeeded by the Troy Steel and Iron Company, with Marvin continuing as a director and the secretary and treasurer until the company closed in November 1895. In June 1897, he was appointed receiver of Albany's Perry Stove Company, which he helped restore to profitability.

== Later career ==
Marvin was a longtime member of the board of trustees and vice president of the Albany City Savings Institution; in June 1894, he became the bank's president. In 1892, he became a director of the Hudson River Telephone Company, and he was appointed president in 1894. In 1895, he organized the Albany District Telegraph Company, and was appointed president and a member of the board of directors. In March 1895, Marvin was appointed to the state board of charities. He was also a trustee of the Corning Foundation, which was responsible for construction or operation of St. Agnes's School, Children's Hospital, and other civic and charitable institutions.

In addition to his business and charitable endeavors, Marvin was a devout Episcopal and a longtime member of the congregation at Albany's Cathedral of All Saints. He served as the congregation's assistant treasurer and treasurer of Albany's Episcopal diocese. He was also treasurer of the diocese's board of missions, aged and infirm clergy fund, fund for widows and orphans of deceased clergy, fund for theological education, and clergy reserve fund. He also served on the board of managers of the national Episcopal church's Domestic and Foreign Missionary Society. Marvin was a member of the Fort Orange Club, Albany Country Club, Army and Navy Club of New York, and Military Order of the Loyal Legion of the United States.

== Personal ==
In September 1868, Marvin married Katharine Langdon Parker, daughter of Amasa J. Parker and sister of Amasa J. Parker Jr. They were married until his death and were the parents of six children: Selden Erastus Jr.; Grace Parker; Langdon Parker; Edmund Roberts; Richard Pratt; and Katharine Langdon.

Marvin died in New York City after an illness of several months that required an extensive hospital stay. His funeral took place al All Saints Cathedral and he was buried at Albany Rural Cemetery.
