= USCC =

USCC may refer to:

- USCC Racing Association, an American snowmobile racing group
- Chelyabinsk Airport, in Russia
- United SportsCar Championship, a North American sports car racing series
- United States Catholic Conference, now part of the United States Conference of Catholic Bishops, the episcopal conference of the Catholic Church in the United States
- U.S. Cellular, the fifth-largest wireless telecommunications network in the United States
- United States Chamber of Commerce, an American lobby group
- United States Christian Commission, an American religious group supporting the Union Army during the American Civil War
- United States Cochrane Center, part of the Cochrane Collaboration
- United States Corps of Cadets, the student body of the United States Military Academy
- United States-China Economic and Security Review Commission
- U.S.–China Economic and Security Review Commission
- Unified Social Credit Identifier, identification system for businesses and organizations in China

== See also ==
- 1st Regiment Cavalry U.S. Colored Troops
- 2nd Regiment Cavalry U.S. Colored Troops
- 3rd Regiment Cavalry U.S. Colored Troops – Formerly 1st Mississippi Cavalry Regiment (African Descent)
- 4th Regiment Cavalry U.S. Colored Troops – Formerly 1st Cavalry, Corps d'Afrique
- 5th Regiment Cavalry U.S. Colored Troops
- 6th Regiment Cavalry U.S. Colored Troops
