= David Bailey =

British photographer (born 1938)

David Bailey CBE
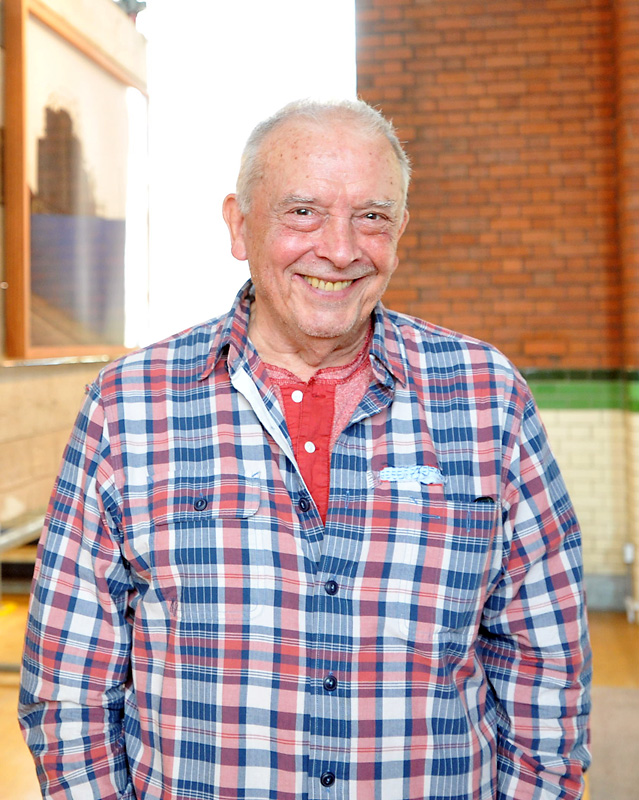
- Bailey in 2012
- Born: David Royston Bailey; 2 January 1938 (age 88); Leytonstone, Essex, England
- Occupations: Photographer; director
- Years active: 1959–present
- Notable work: Box of Pin-ups (1964); Goodbye Baby & Amen: a Saraband for the Sixties (1969); Another Image: Papua New Guinea (1975), David Bailey: Birth of the Cool, 1957–1969 (1999)
- Spouses: Rosemary Bramble (m. 1960; div. 1961) Catherine Deneuve (m. 1965; div. 1972) Marie Helvin (m. 1975; div. 1985) Catherine Dyer (m. 1986)
- Children: 3

David Royston Bailey (born 2 January 1938) is an English photographer and director, most known for his fashion photography and portraiture, and role in shaping the image of the Swinging Sixties. Bailey has also directed several television commercials and documentaries.

== Early life ==
David Royston Bailey was born at Whipps Cross University Hospital, Leytonstone, to Herbert Bailey, a tailor's cutter, and his wife Gladys, a machinist. From the age of three he lived in East Ham.

Bailey developed a love of natural history, and this led him into photography. As he had undiagnosed dyslexia, he experienced problems at school. He attended a private school, Clark's College in Ilford, where he says they taught him less than the more basic council school. As well as dyslexia he also has the motor skill disorder dyspraxia (developmental coordination disorder).

In one school year, he claims he only attended 33 times. He left school on his fifteenth birthday to become a copy boy at the Fleet Street offices of the Yorkshire Post. He raced through a series of dead end jobs, before his call-up for national service in 1956, serving with the Royal Air Force in Singapore in 1957. The appropriation of his trumpet forced him to consider other creative outlets, and he bought a Rolleiflex camera.

Bailey was demobolized in August 1958, and, determined to pursue a career in photography, he bought a Canon rangefinder camera. Unable to obtain a place at the London College of Printing because of his school record, he became a second assistant to David Ollins, in Charlotte Mews. He earned £3 10s (£3.50) a week, and acted as studio dogsbody. He was delighted to be called to an interview with photographer John French.

== Professional career ==
One of Bailey's images of London gangsters Ronnie and Reggie Kray

In 1959 Bailey became a photographic assistant at the John French studio, and in May 1960 he was a photographer for John Cole's Studio Five, before being contracted as a fashion photographer for British Vogue magazine later that year. He also undertook a large amount of freelance work.

Along with Terence Donovan and Brian Duffy, Bailey captured and helped create the "Swinging London" of the 1960s: a culture of fashion and celebrity chic. The three photographers socialised with actors, musicians and royalty, and found themselves elevated to celebrity status. Together, they were the first real celebrity photographers, named by Norman Parkinson "the Black Trinity".

In 1966 Bailey directed the short film G.G. Passion.

The 1966 film Blowup, directed by Michelangelo Antonioni, depicts the life of a London fashion photographer played by David Hemmings, whose character was inspired by Bailey. The Swinging London scene was aptly reflected in his Box of Pin-Ups (1964): a box of poster-prints of 1960s celebrities including Terence Stamp, The Beatles, Mick Jagger, Jean Shrimpton, P. J. Proby, Cecil Beaton, Rudolf Nureyev and East End gangsters, the Kray twins. The Box was an unusual and unique commercial release. It reflected the changing status of the photographer that one could sell a collection of prints in this way. Strong objection to the presence of the Krays by fellow photographer, Lord Snowdon, was the major reason no American edition of the Box was released, and that a second British edition was not issued. The record sale for a copy of Box of Pin-Ups is reported as "north of £20,000".

At Vogue, Bailey was shooting covers within months, and, at the height of his productivity, he shot 800 pages of Vogue editorial in one year. Penelope Tree, a former girlfriend, described him as "the king lion on the Savannah: incredibly attractive, with a dangerous vibe. He was the electricity, the brightest, most powerful, most talented, most energetic force at the magazine".

American Vogue's creative director Grace Coddington, then a model herself, said "It was the Sixties, it was a raving time, and Bailey was unbelievably good-looking. He was everything that you wanted him to be – like the Beatles but accessible – and when he went on the market everyone went in. We were all killing ourselves to be his model, although he hooked up with Jean Shrimpton pretty quickly".

Of model Jean Shrimpton, Bailey said:

She was magic and the camera loved her too. In a way she was the cheapest model in the world – you only needed to shoot half a roll of film and then you had it. She had the knack of having her hand in the right place, she knew where the light was, she was just a natural.

Bailey was hired in 1970 by Island Records' Chris Blackwell to shoot publicity photos of Cat Stevens for his upcoming album Tea for the Tillerman. Stevens, who is now known as Yusuf Islam, maintains that he disliked having his photo on the cover of his albums, as had previously been the case, although he allowed Bailey's photographs to be placed on the inner sleeve of the album. Bailey also photographed album sleeve art for musicians including The Rolling Stones and Marianne Faithfull.

Bailey directed and produced the TV documentaries Beaton (1971) on Cecil Beaton, Visconti (1972) on Luchino Visconti, and Warhol (1973) on Andy Warhol.

In 1972, rock singer Alice Cooper was photographed by Bailey for Vogue magazine, almost naked apart from a snake. Cooper used Bailey the following year to shoot for the group's chart topping Billion Dollar Babies album. The shoot included a baby wearing shocking eye makeup and, supposedly, one billion dollars in cash requiring the shoot to be under armed guard. In 1976, Bailey published Ritz Newspaper together with David Litchfield. In 1985, Bailey was photographing stars at the Live Aid concert at Wembley Stadium. As he recalled later: "The atmosphere on the day was great. At one point I got a tap on my shoulder and spun round. Suddenly there was a big tongue down my throat! It was Freddie Mercury."

In 1992, Bailey directed the BBC drama Who Dealt? starring Juliet Stevenson, story by Ring Lardner. In 1995 he directed and wrote the South Bank Film The Lady is a Tramp featuring his wife Catherine Bailey. In 1998 he directed a documentary with Ginger Television Production, Models Close Up, commissioned by Channel 4 Television.

In 2012, the BBC made a film of the story of his 1962 New York photoshoot with Jean Shrimpton, entitled We'll Take Manhattan, starring Aneurin Barnard as Bailey.

In October 2013, Bailey took part in Art Wars at the Saatchi Gallery curated by Ben Moore. The artist was issued with a stormtrooper helmet, which he transformed into a work of art. Proceeds went to the Missing Tom Fund set up by Ben Moore to find his brother Tom who has been missing for over ten years. The work was also shown on the Regents Park platform as part of Art Below Regents Park.

In October 2020 Bailey's memoir Look Again (co-written with James Fox) was published by Macmillan Books, a review of his life and work.

== Fashion ==
Bailey began working with fashion brand Jaeger in the late 1950s when Jean Muir landed the role of designer. After working alongside other fashion photographers such as the late Norman Parkinson, Bailey was officially commissioned by Vogue in 1962.

His first shoot in New York City was of young model Jean Shrimpton, who wore a range of Jaeger and Susan Small clothing, including a camel suit with a green blouse and a suede coat worn with kitten heels. The shoot was titled 'Young Idea Goes West'.

After 53 years Bailey returned to Jaeger to shoot their AW15 campaign. As menswear subject; James Penfold modelled tailored tweed blazers and a camel coat. Also on the shoot was model, philanthropist and film director Elisa Sednaoui along with GQ magazine's most stylish male 2003, Martin Gardner.

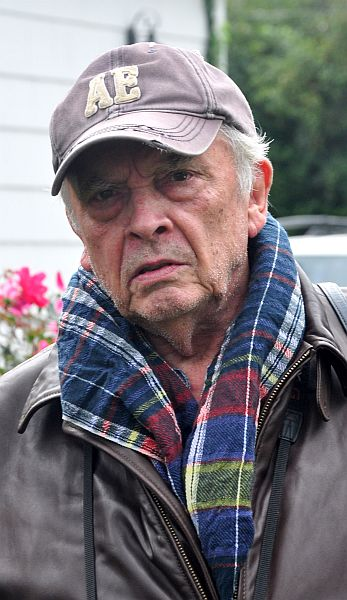
Bailey in 2011

== Awards ==
- 2001: Commander of the Order of the British Empire, as part of 2001 Queen's Birthday Honours.
- 2005: Centenary Medal and Honorary Fellowship (HonFRPS), Royal Photographic Society.
- 2016: Lifetime Achievement award, Infinity Awards, International Center of Photography, New York.

== Painting and sculpture ==
Bailey paints and sculpts. Some of his sculptures were shown in London in 2010, and paintings and mixed media works were shown in October 2011.

== Television appearances ==
In the 1970s Bailey lost some equipment in a robbery and replaced it with the new Olympus OM system equipment which was substantially smaller and lighter than contemporary competitors' equipment. He then appeared in advertising promoting the Olympus OM-1 35 mm single lens reflex camera. He subsequently appeared in a series of UK television commercials for the Olympus Trip camera.

== Personal life ==
Bailey was married in February 1960 to typist Rosemary Bramble; they separated nine months later. He had a four-year relationship with Jean Shrimpton that ended in 1964. In the spring of 1965 he dated Jill St. John. Bailey was subsequently involved with model-turned-painter Sue Murray, but left her for Catherine Deneuve, whom he married on 18 August 1965 after a two-week courtship. They separated in 1967 and officially divorced in 1972. In November 1975, Bailey married model-turned-writer Marie Helvin. They amicably divorced in 1985. Since 1986, Bailey has been married to former model Catherine Dyer. Bailey and Dyer have three children.

Bailey's company is based in London. The family maintains a home on Dartmoor, near Plymouth.

Bailey was diagnosed with vascular dementia in 2018.

== Books ==
- Box of Pin-Ups, 1964
- Goodbye Baby & Amen, 1969, 2017
- Warhol, 1974
- Beady Minces, 1974
- Papua New Guinea, 1975
- Mixed Moments, 1976
- Trouble and Strife, 1980
- Mrs. David Bailey, 1980
- Bailey NW1, 1982
- Black & White Memories, 1983
- Nudes 1981–1984, 1984
- Imagine, 1985
- If We Shadows, 1992
- The Lady is a Tramp, 1995
- Rock & Roll Heroes, 1997
- Archive One, 1999 (also titled The Birth of the Cool for USA)
- Chasing Rainbows, 2001
- Art of Violence, Kate Kray & David Bailey, 2003 (also titled Diamond Geezers)
- Bailey/Rankin Down Under, 2003
- Archive Two: Locations, 2003
- Bailey's Democracy, 2005
- Havana, 2006
- NY JS DB 62, 2007
- Pictures That Mark Can Do, 2007
- Is That So Kid, 2008
- David Bailey: 8 Minutes: Hirst & Bailey, 2009 With Damien Hirst
- EYE, 2009
- Flowers, Skulls, Contacts, 2010
- British Heroes in Afghanistan, 2010
- Bailey's East End (Steidl, 2014) 3 vols.
- The David Bailey SUMO, 2019
- Look Again, 2020
- Eighties Bailey, 2024

== Exhibitions ==
External videos
- Susie Bubble visits Bailey's Stardust on YouTube, TheArtFundUK

- National Portrait Gallery 1971
- One Man Retrospective Victoria & Albert Museum 1983
- International Center of Photography (ICP) NY 1984
- Curator "Shots of Style" Victoria & Albert Museum 1985
- Pictures of Sudan for Band Aid at The Institute for Contemporary Arts (ICA) *1985
- Auction at Sotheby's for Live Aid Concert for Band Aid 1985
- Bailey Now! Royal Photographic Society in Bath 1989
- Numerous Exhibitions at Hamiltons Gallery, London. 1989 to now
- Fahey Klein Gallery, Los Angeles 1990
- Camerawork Photogallerie, Berlin. 1997
- Carla Sozzani. Milan. 1997
- A Gallery for Fine Photography, New Orleans. 1998
- Touring exhibition "Birth of the Cool" 1957–1969 & contemporary work
- Barbican Art Gallery, London – 1999
- National Museum of Film, Photography & Television, Bradford. 1999–2000
- Moderna Museet, Stockholm, Sweden. 2000
- City Art Museum, Helsinki, Finland 2000
- Modern Art Museum, The Dean Gallery, National Galleries of Scotland, Edinburgh 2001
- Proud Gallery London Bailey /Rankin Down Under
- Gagosian Gallery. Joint with Damien Hirst "14 Stations of the Cross" 2004
- Gagosian Gallery. Artists by David Bailey. 2004
- Democracy. Faggionato Fine Arts 2005
- Havana. Faggionato Fine Arts 2006
- Pop Art Gagosian London 2007
- Galeria Hilario Galguera Mexico 2007
- National Portrait Gallery – Beatles to Bowie 2009
- Bonhams, London. Pure Sixties Pure Bailey 2010
- Pangolin London. Sculpture + 2010
- The Stockdale Effect, Paul Stolper Gallery, London 2010
- David Bailey's East End. Compressor House, London, 2012.
- David Bailey's East End Faces London February/May 2013
- Bailey's Stardust, National Portrait Gallery, London 2014
- Bailey's Stardust, National Gallery, Edinburgh 2015
- David Bailey Stardust, PAC – Padiglione di Arte Contemporanea, Milano (Italy) 2015
