= John Cole (choreographer) =

Zimbabwean dancer and choreographer (born 1988)

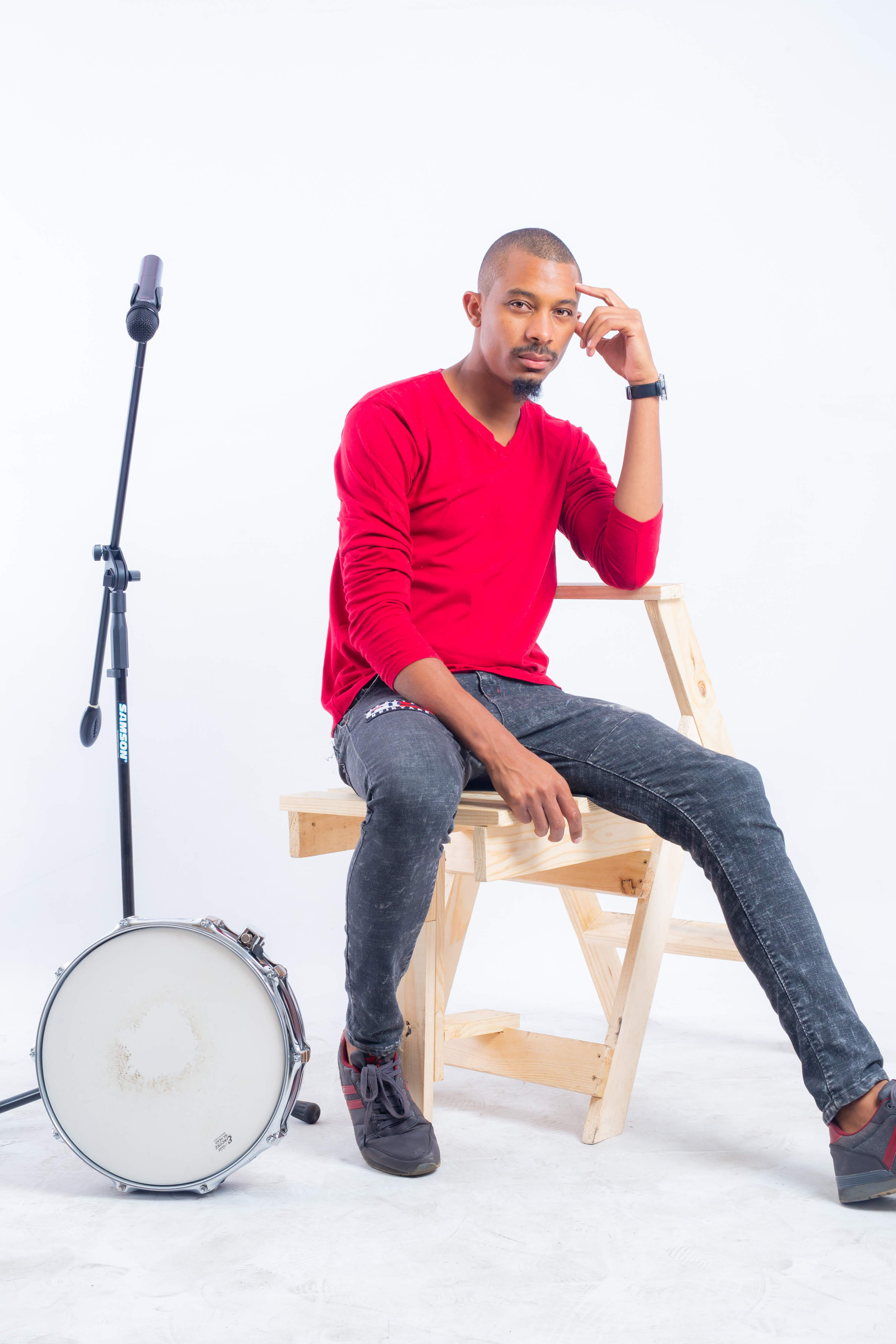
- Born: June 16, 1988 (age 37); Harare
- Occupation: Choreographer
- Years active: 2004 - present
- Known for: Dance and choreography
- Spouse: Cindy Cole
- Children: 2

John Cole (born June 16, 1988) is a Zimbabwean choreographer and performing artist.

== Early youth ==
John Cole was born into a family of six to Phillip Cole and Beverley Johnson in 1988. He grew up in the suburb of Sunningdale, Harare. After his parents died, Cole stayed with his grandmother. John Cole attended Primary School at Ardbennie Primary School and Sunningdale but could not continue with his O Levels at Morgan High School.

== Early career ==
John attempted a sports career as a cricketer and underwent trials with the Zimbabwe National Cricket team, but could not go on due to an injury. After the injury, Cole focused on dancing starting his dance career in 2004 with Slicker dance crew.

John was part of dance a troupe The Inmates dance crew which won the inaugural Jibilika Dance Competition in 2007.

== Career ==
Cole has choreographed for Zimbabwe's top artistes such as Ammara Brown, Jah Prayzah, Cynthia Mare Winky D, Mai Titi, Sharon Manatsa, Vimbai Zimuto as well as national events, concerts and events.

Cole is the founder and president of The Zimbabwe Choreographers and Dancers Association as well as president of Zimbabwe Dance Industry Awards. Cole is former dance teacher at Harare International School and Maranatha Group of Schools.

=== Music ===
Cole is a recording artist with five studio songs featuring Lee Mchoney, Ghanaian Theophilus Nii Arday Otoo/ Epixode, Dj Naida and Ashta Eez

=== Discography ===
Song	Album	Year
Skoro skoro feat. Lee McHoney	Single	2018
Xhexhe feat. Ashta Eez	Single	2019
Body Abduktion feat. Epixode and Shashl	Single	2019
Candy	Single	2021
Gotta feeling	Single	2021

=== Choreography ===
John Cole is said to have choreographed over 500 weddings. He was one of the many notable choreographers that choreographed a number of viral Zimbabwean corporate videos for the Jerusalema dancer challenge He choreographed the Nash TV debut performance by Zimbabwean comedian socialite Felistas Murata Edwards, known as Mai TT.

=== Television ===
John's on-screen performances started off on Zimbabwe Broadcasting Corporation. Cole then featured in Zimbabwean productions Far From Yesterday and the series Man Hounds.

=== Music video cameos ===
- Tichichema - Ammara Brown
- Ngoro - Cynthia Mare
- Watora Moyo - Shanky
- Setter Pace - Cindy Munyavi
- Firita - Baba Harare

== Awards and accolades ==
- Zimbabwe Model Awards - Best Choreographer 2015 and 2016
- Zimbabwe Hiphop Awards - Best Solo Dancer 2016
- National Arts Merit Awards - Outstanding Dancer 2017 (nominee)
- Events Industry Awards - Choreographer Of The Year 2018, Entertainer Of The Year 2018, Entertainer People's Choice 2018
- Star FM Music Awards - Best House Song (Skoro skoro)2018 (nominee)
- Zimbabwe Music Awards - Best Dance 2021 (nominee)
- Changamire Awards - Best Dancer 2021 (nominee)
