= Olympus Trip 35 =

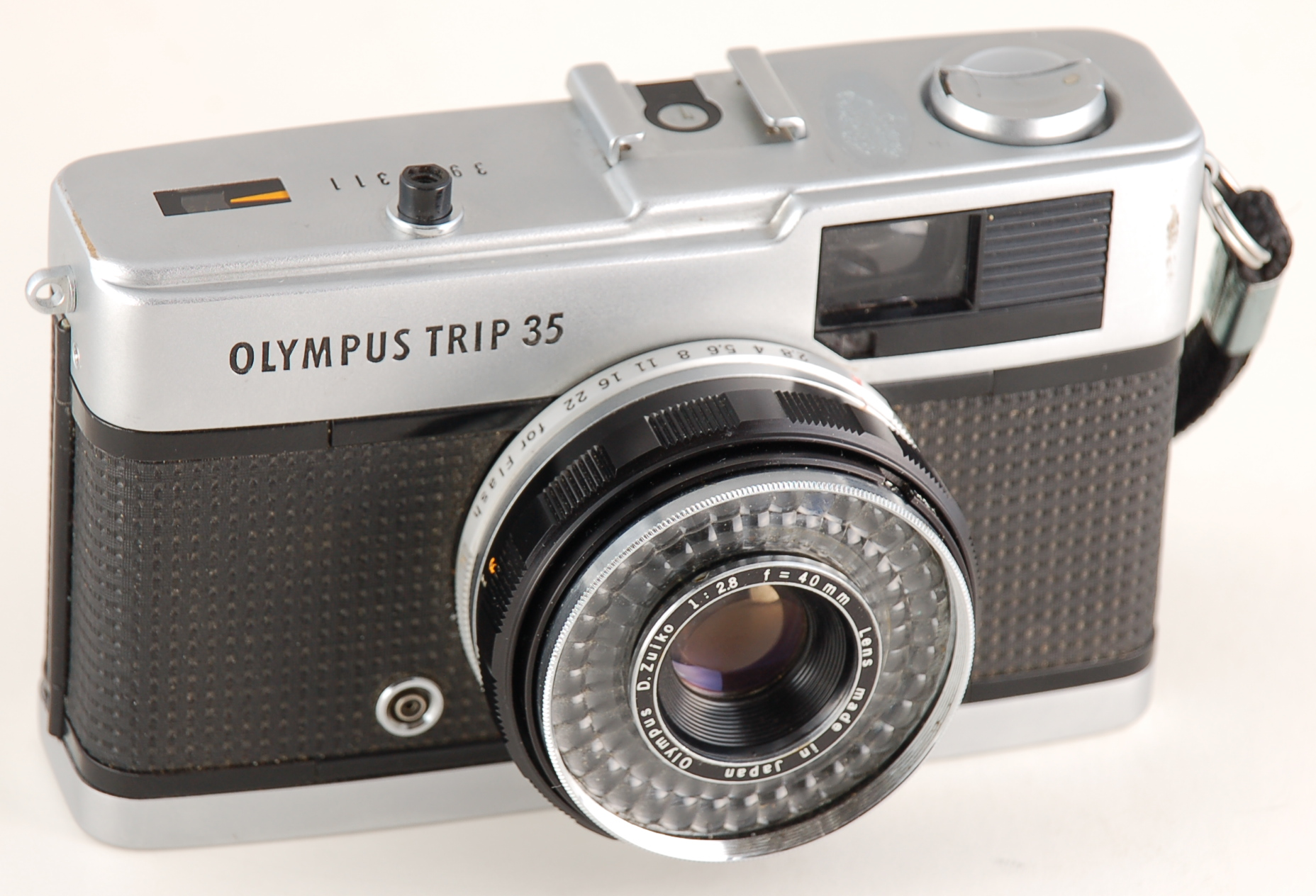
- Olympus Trip 35

Overview
- Maker: Olympus Optical Co. Ltd.
- Type: 35 mm compact camera
- Released: 1967

Lens
- Lens mount: fixed lens
- Lens: 40 mm f/2.8 Olympus D. Zuiko, 4 elements, three groups.

Sensor/medium
- Film format: 35mm
- Film size: 36 mm x 24 mm

General
- Dimensions: 124×72×57 mm (4.9×2.8×2.2 in)
- Weight: 390 g (14 oz) (390 g)
- Made in: Japan

The Olympus Trip 35 is a 35mm compact camera, manufactured by Olympus. It was introduced in 1967 and discontinued, after a lengthy production run, in 1984. The Trip name is a reference to its intended market—people who wanted a compact, functional camera for holidays. During the 1970s, it was the subject of an advertising campaign that featured popular British photographer David Bailey. Over ten million units were sold.

The Trip 35 was a point and shoot model with a 40 mm f/2.8 lens, self-powered selenium light meter, and just two shutter speeds. In 'A' mode, the camera operates as a Program automatic, choosing either 1/40 s or 1/200 s. The camera could also sync with flash, and has a range of aperture settings, from f/2.8 to f/22. In flash sync mode, the shutter is set at 1/40 s. Apart from a simple four-position zone focus system, and an ISO setting from 25 to 400, the camera has no other photographic controls. The camera has a Prontor-Compur sync connector and a hot shoe. Its lens was a coated Zuiko 40 mm f/2.8, with four elements in three groups.

The camera has an ISO range of 25–400, as films faster than 400 were uncommon at the time and delivered reduced image quality. 25 speed allowed the use of Kodachrome, while 400 speed allowed use of Kodak Tri-X and similar fast materials under low light. Earlier models, from the first few years of production, have a maximum ISO speed of 200.

The use of a selenium photocell to select the shutter speeds and aperture let novices use the camera as a "point & shoot". No batteries are needed to power the camera.

The lack of more than two shutter speeds was not a problem. At 1/200 s and f/22 with 400-speed film, the camera could deliver correct exposure in full sunlight, while at 1/40 s and f/2.8, correct exposure could be obtained under bright fluorescent light, without a flash.
