= SF =

SF or Sf may refer to:

== Locations ==
- San Francisco, California, United States
- Sioux Falls, South Dakota, United States
- Sidi Fredj, Algeria
- South Florida, an urban region in the United States
- Suomi Finland, former vehicular country code for Finland

== Arts and entertainment ==
=== Genres ===
- Speculative fiction (usually sf)
  - Science fiction or sci-fi (usually SF)

=== Film and television ===
- Svensk Filmindustri, the Swedish film industry
  - SF Film Finland, a Finnish film distributor
- SF Channel (Australia)
- Schweizer Fernsehen, a German-language television network in Switzerland
- Suomen Filmiteollisuus, a Finnish film production company

=== Music ===
- Sforzando (musical direction) or sf, a musical accent
- Subito forte, a musical notation for dynamics (music)
- Switchfoot, a band
- Sasha Fierce, on-stage alter ego of American entertainer Beyoncé, and namesake of her album I Am... Sasha Fierce

=== Other media ===
- Saikoro Fiction, a Japanese role-playing game system
- Street Fighter, a series of fighting video games by Capcom

== Businesses and organizations ==
=== Politics ===
- Salzburg Forum, European security intergovernmental organization
- Samoa First, a political party in Samoa
- Sinn Féin, an Irish political party
- Socialistisk Folkeparti, a political party in Denmark
- Sosialistisk Folkeparti, a splinter group of the Norwegian Labour Party

=== Other businesses and organizations ===
- Statsforetak, a type of Norwegian state enterprise
- SF Express, a Chinese multinational delivery services and logistics company
  - SF Airlines, a Chinese cargo airline owned by SF Express
- SF Group, a cinema and entertainment venue operator in Thailand
- Salesforce, an American cloud computing company specializing in customer resource management
- Six Flags, an American amusement park company
  - Six Flags (1961–2024), a defunct amusement park company that merged with Cedar Fair in 2024
- SourceForge, a web-based service that offers a source code repository, download mirrors, bug tracking and other features
- Space forces, military service branches for space operations
- Special forces, military units trained to perform unconventional missions
- State Farm, an American insurance company
- Tassili Airlines (IATA designator SF)
- A common shorthand for "Standard Form", a designation used by the United States Office of Personnel Management for forms used across various government agencies

== Science, math, and engineering ==
- DOH-5-hemiFLY (semi-fly; SF), a psychedelic drug
- Significant figures, numeric digits contributing meaningfully to measurement resolution
- Safety factor, the capacity of a system beyond expected or actual loads
- Small find, an artifact independent from other artifacts
- Spontaneous fission, a form of radioactive decay found in very heavy elements
- Square foot, unit of area
- Stacking fault, a dislocation in a crystal
- Stick figure, a very simple drawing of a human or other animal

== Sports ==
- A common abbreviation for the U.S. city of San Francisco, California's major professional sports teams:
  - San Francisco 49ers, the city's National Football League team
  - San Francisco Giants, the city's Major League Baseball team
- Small forward, a position in basketball
- Stade Français, a French rugby union team based in Paris
- Superleague Formula, a former motorsport racing series
- Super Formula Championship, a Japanese motorsport racing series
- Sacrifice fly, a play in baseball
- Semi-finals, a round in elimination tournaments
- Scuderia Ferrari, an Italian Formula One team

== Other uses ==
- San Francisco (sans-serif typeface), Apple's sans-serif and corporate typeface
- United States Air Force Security Forces, the ground combat, force protection and military police force of the U.S. Air Force
- United States Army Special Forces, special operations organization of the U.S. Army
- Selle Français, a French breed of horse
- A former hull classification symbol for a fleet submarine in the United States Navy
- Franklin Avenue Shuttle in New York City, sometimes signed as S^{F} in documents

== See also ==
- Garland SF-01 and Garland SF-03, fictional racing cars in Future GPX Cyber Formula
