= Richard P. Marvin =

American judge (1803–1892)

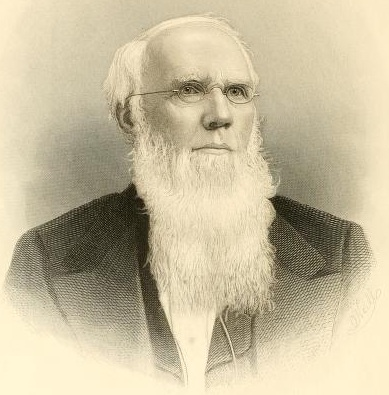

Member of the U.S. House of Representatives from New York's 31st district
- In office March 4, 1837 – March 3, 1841
- Preceded by: Abner Hazeltine
- Succeeded by: Staley N. Clarke

New York State Assembly
- In office January 1, 1836 – December 31, 1836
- Preceded by: Orrin McClure; John Woodward Jr.
- Succeeded by: Alvin Plumb; Calvin Rumsey; William Wilcox

Personal details
- Born: Richard Pratt Marvin; December 23, 1803 Fairfield, New York
- Died: January 11, 1892 (aged 88) Jamestown, New York
- Party: Whig
- Spouse: Isabella Newland (m. 1834; died 1872)
- Relations: William Marvin (brother)

Richard Pratt Marvin (December 23, 1803 – January 11, 1892) was an American lawyer and politician from New York. A Whig, he served in the United States House of Representatives from 1837 to 1841.

== Early life ==
Marvin was born on December 23, 1803, in Fairfield, Herkimer County, New York. He was a son of Selden Marvin and Charlotte (née Pratt) Marvin. His family removed to Dryden, New York, in 1809. His brother, William Marvin, was a United States federal judge and the 7th Governor of Florida.

He studied law, was admitted to the bar in 1829, and commenced practice in Jamestown, New York.

== Career ==
He was a member from Chautauqua County of the New York State Assembly in 1836.

Marvin was elected as a Whig to the 25th and 26th United States Congresses, and served from March 4, 1837, to March 3, 1841. He was chairman of the Committee on Expenditures in the Post Office Department (26th Congress).

He was a delegate to the New York State Constitutional Convention of 1846. He was a justice of the New York Supreme Court (8th District) from 1847 to 1871, and was ex officio a judge of the New York Court of Appeals in 1855 and 1863. Afterwards he resumed the practice of law in Jamestown.

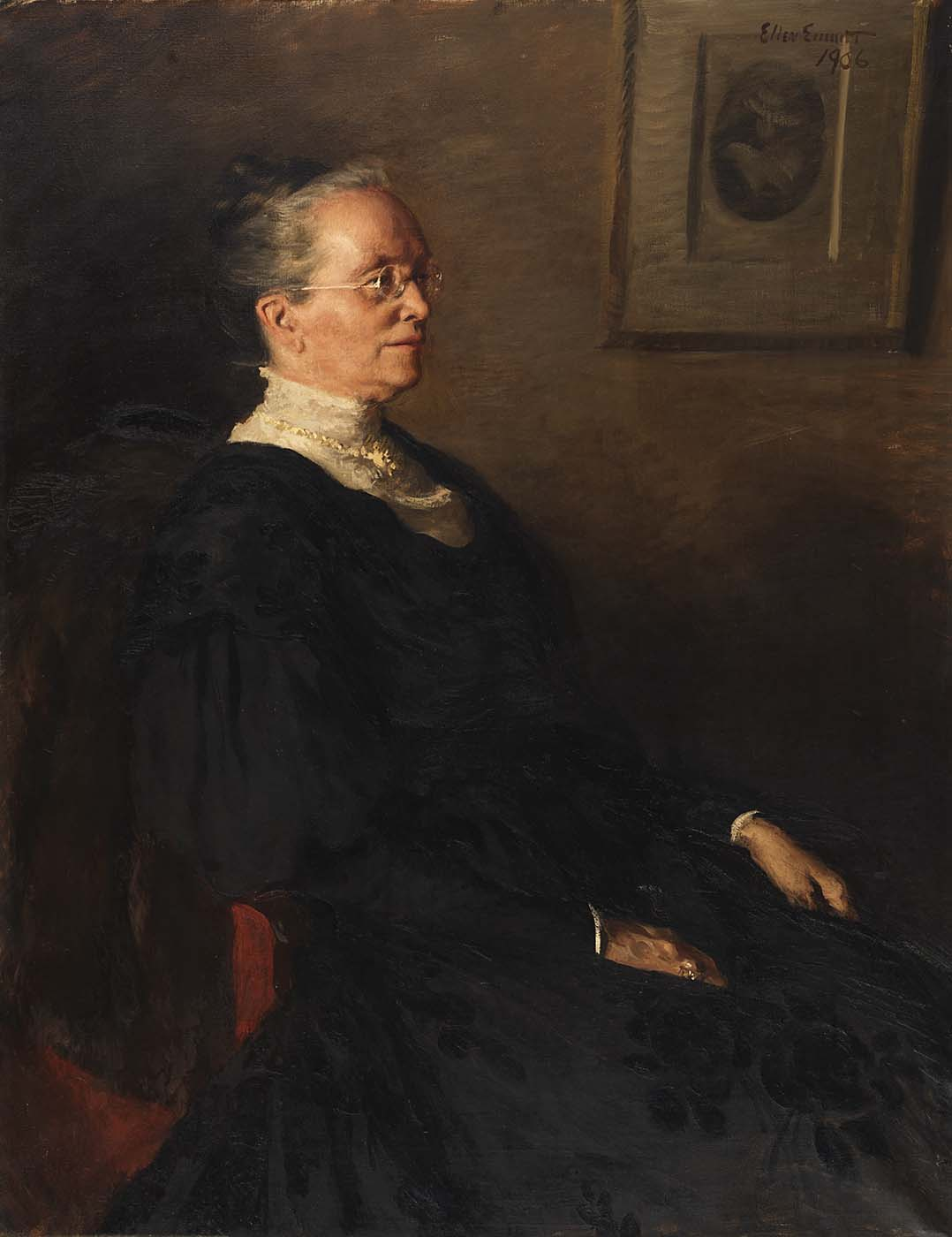
Portrait of his daughter Mary, by Ellen Emmet Rand, 1906

== Personal life ==
On September 8, 1834, Marvin was married to Isabella Newland (1811–1872), a daughter of David Newland and Jane (née McHarg) Newland. Together, they were the parents of:

- Selden Erastus Marvin (1835–1899), the Adjutant General of New York who married Katharine Langdon Parker (1846–1907) in 1868.
- David Newland Marvin (1839–1875), who married Julia Ormes, a daughter of Dr. Cornelius Ormes, in 1870.
- Mary Elizabeth Marvin (1841–1907), who married Benjamin Goodrich, founder of the B. F. Goodrich Company.
- William Richard Marvin (1843–1863), who died unmarried of disease contracted while serving in the Army of the Potomac during the Civil War.
- Isabella Marvin (1849–1881), who died unmarried.

Marvin died on January 11, 1892, in Jamestown, Chautauqua County, New York. He was buried at Lakeview Cemetery in Jamestown.

U.S. House of Representatives
Preceded by Abner Hazeltine	Member of the U.S. House of Representatives from New York's 31st congressional district 1837–1841	Succeeded by Staley N. Clarke
