= Utah Geological Survey =

Division of the Utah Department of Natural Resources

The Utah Geological Survey is based in Salt Lake City, Utah, United States. It also has an office in Cedar City, Utah.

It is a division of the Utah Department of Natural Resources and is an applied scientific agency, which creates, interprets, and provides information about Utah's geological environment, resources and hazards, in order to promote safe, beneficial, and wise land usage.

Its departments and programs are: Editorial Services, Geologic Hazards Program, Energy & Minerals Program, Geologic Information and Outreach Program, Geologic Mapping Program, Ground Water and Paleontology Program, and the State Energy Program.

The UGS has worked on countless projects in the state, including statewide geologic hazards maps, oil shale assessment, Great Salt Lake studies, fault trenching, and the Snake Valley/West Desert Groundwater Monitoring Well Project. In addition, recent research and general geologic information is given in teacher-friendly formats for anyone to use.

== History ==
The "University Geological and Resource Survey of Utah" was founded in 1919, but without funding. In 1931 the "Utah Geological and Mineralogical Survey" was created by the Utah State Legislature. The state governor appointed an advisory board, but no funding was appropriated for salaries or operations and no personnel were assigned to the Survey.

In 1941 the UGMS was placed in the newly created "Utah State Department of Publicity and Industrial Development" (UPID). The UPID hired geologist A.M. Buranek. Over the next few years, Buranek and other contract personnel publish 36 geologic publications sponsored by the UPID. During 1946 the governor appointed Arthur L. Crawford as commissioner of the UPID and urged Crawford to activate the UGMS. Crawford re-hired Buranek and added other geologists, but work continued under the auspices of the UPID.

UPID was disbanded by the state in 1949 and the UGMS was transferred to the State School of Mines and Mineral Industries at the University of Utah. Crawford was appointed first Director of the UGMS and the Legislature appropriated $25,000 for the 1949–1951 biennial budget. From 1961 to 1965 the UGMS and University of Utah College of Mines and Mineral Industries jointly published the four-part, 1:250,000-scale geologic map of Utah. The first issue of the quarterly publication Quarterly Review (renamed Survey Notes in 1976), containing information pertaining to Utah's geology and mineral industry, was published in 1964.

In 1973 the Legislature transferred the UGMS from the University of Utah to the Utah Department of Natural Resources and officially named the Survey Director as the State Geologist. The Survey's name was also shortened to "Utah Geological and Mineral Survey" (previously "Mineralogical"). In 1977, when it created the Utah Seismic Safety Advisory Council, the Legislature charged the Survey with responsibility for assessing earthquake risks throughout the state.

The UGMS name was shortened again to "Utah Geological Survey" in 1991. In 1996 the UGS moved to the new Utah Department of Natural Resources complex and opened its regional office in Cedar City.
