= John Coles =

John Coles may refer to:

- John David Coles, film and television director
- John Coles (historian) (1930–2020), British archaeologist
- John Coles (diplomat) (born 1937), former British High Commissioner to Australia
- John Coles (businessman) (1833–1919), English businessman
- John Coles (bowls) (1892–1972), English bowls player
- Johnny Coles (1926–1997), American jazz musician

== See also ==
- John Cole's Book Shop, San Diego, California
- John Cole (disambiguation)
