= Jonathan Cole =

Jonathan Cole may refer to:

- Jonathan Cole (composer) (born 1970), British composer and professor of composition
- Jonathan R. Cole (born 1942), American sociologist
- Jonathan Cole (psychiatrist) (died 2009), American psychiatrist
- Jonathan Cole (NCIS), a character in the television series NCIS
- Jonathan Cole (British Army officer) (born 1967), British general

== See also ==
- Jon Cole (disambiguation)
