= John Byrne (computer scientist) =

Computer scientist and engineer

John Gabriel Byrne
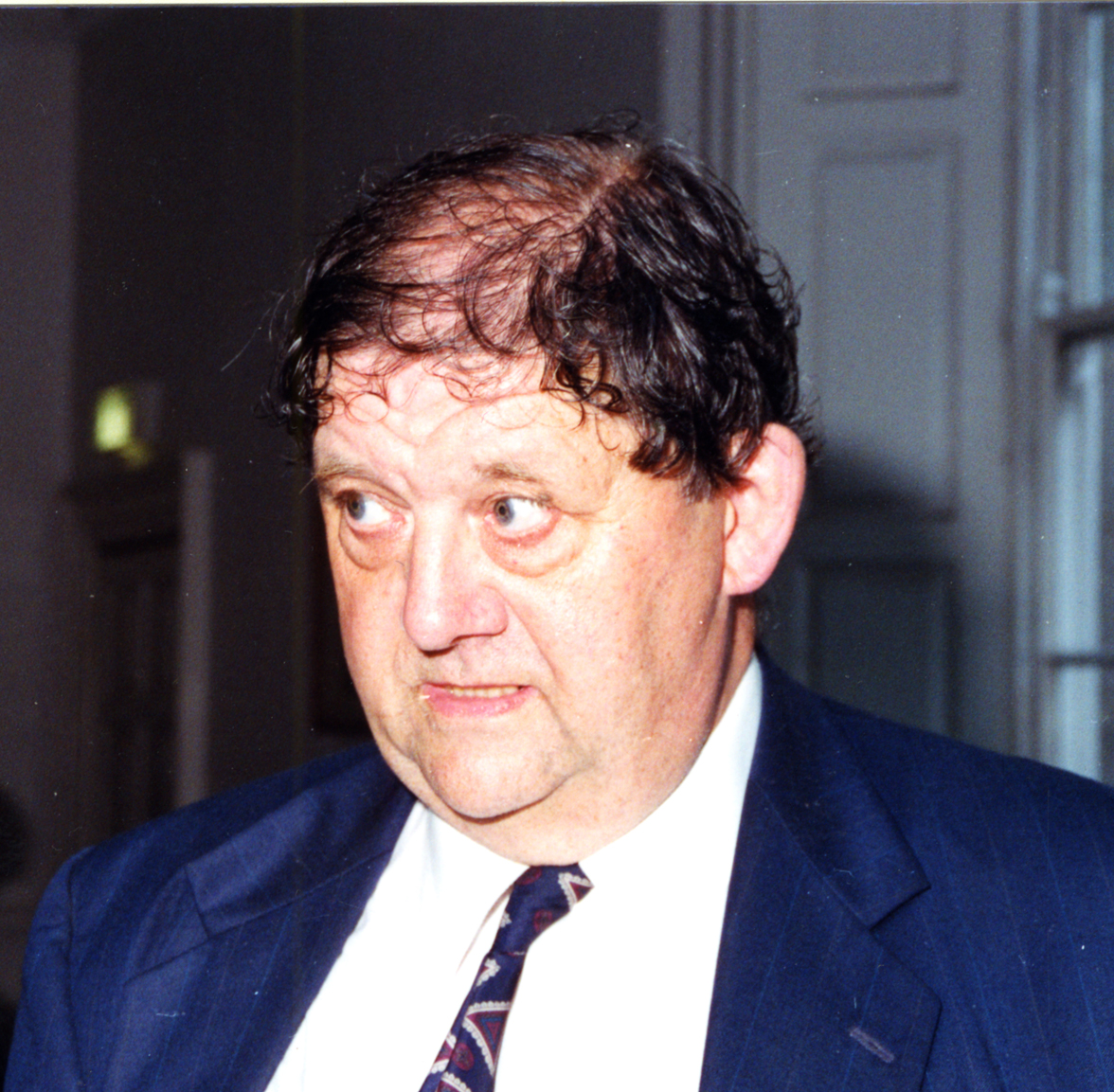
- Born: 25 July 1933; Dublin, Ireland
- Died: 16 April 2016 (aged 82); Dublin
- Education: Trinity College Dublin
- Scientific career
- Fields: Computer science
- Workplaces: Trinity College Dublin
- Thesis: The torsion of hollow beams (1961)
- Doctoral advisor: William Wright

John Gabriel Byrne (15 July 1933 – 16 April 2016) was an Irish computer scientist and engineer. He founded the department of computer science in Trinity College Dublin, serving as its first head and professor, and has been referred to as "The Father of Computing in Ireland".

== Early life and education ==
John Gabriel Byrne was born in Dublin on 25 July 1933. He was the only son of Doreen (née Lawlor) and Thomas Brendan Byrne. The family lived in Rathfarnham. His paternal grandfather was the architect, Thomas Joseph Byrne, as was his great-grandfather, Anthony Scott. He attended Belvedere College and in 1951 he entered Trinity College Dublin (TCD) to study engineering, graduating in 1956. He went on to work in Birmingham with Septimus Willis, and then study for a Diploma in Concrete Technology at Imperial College London. He completed his PhD at TCD under the supervision of Prof William Wright, the head of the School of Engineering. His 1961 doctoral thesis was a study in mathematically complex solutions for torsional stresses in hollow reinforced concrete beams. He studied with Bernard Carré on the English Electric DEUCE computer at Stafford over the course of 2 summers. In 1960, Byrne was awarded an Imperial Chemical Industries Research Fellowship.

== Career ==
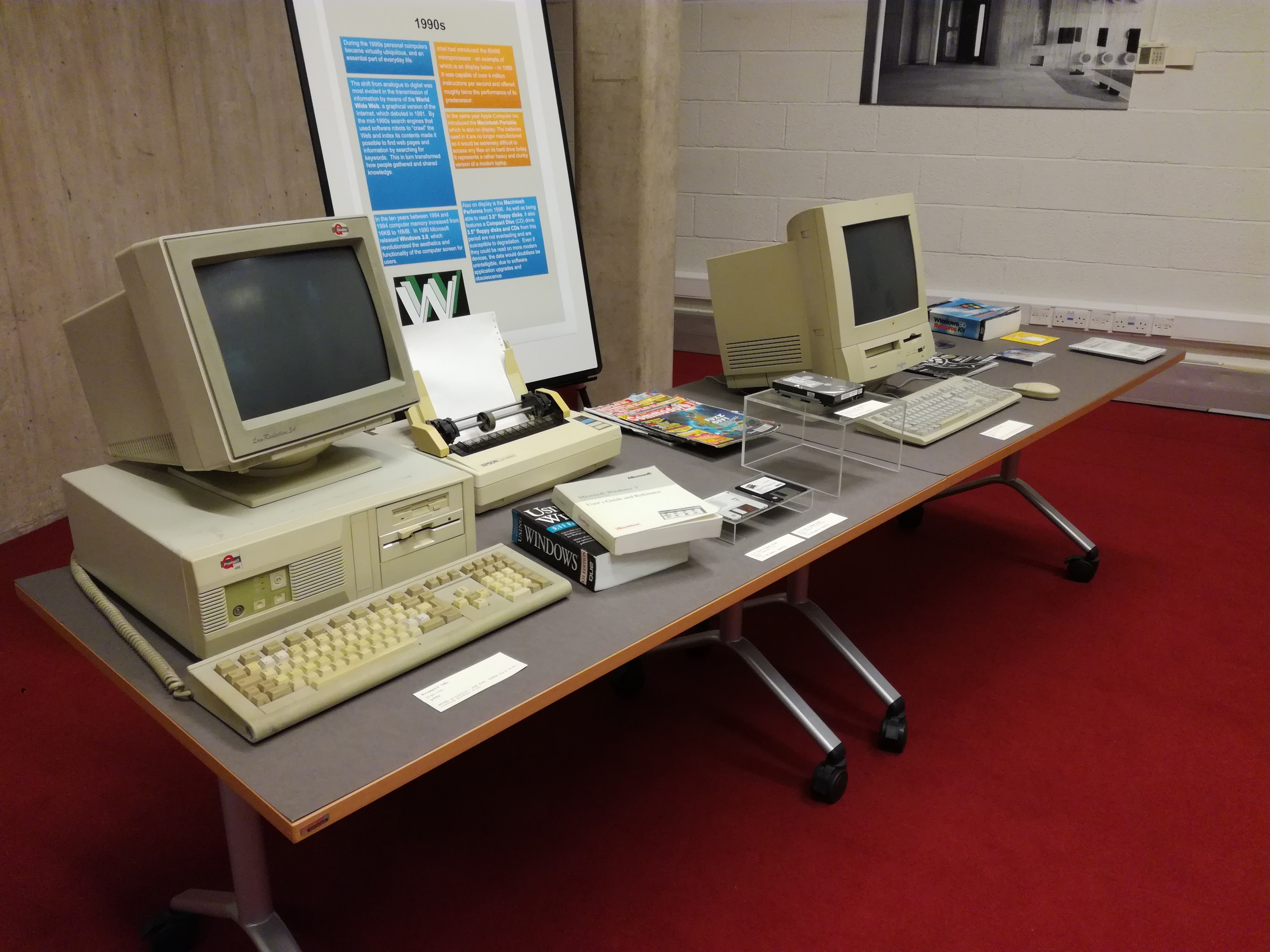
An exhibit from the pop-up Museum of Technology using Byrne's collection, marking International Digital Preservation Day 2017 in the Library of Trinity College Dublin

Byrne was appointed a junior lecturer at the engineering school at TCD in 1963. Supported by Wright, who campaigned for TCD to buy its first computer in 1962, an IBM 1620. Byrne proposed TCD's first evening course in computer programming and systems analysis which ran for two nights a week. The course was industry-aligned, and was aimed at young graduates interested in learning these skills. The success of the evening course led to the creation of a BA Mod degree programme. Byrne has been credited with a key role in the development of the computer industry in Ireland from the 1960s onwards through his pioneering courses in computer science and the quality of the graduates produced. He has also been credited with encouraging more women into the field when it had become predominantly a male discipline.

Byrne became the first head of computer science in TCD when the department was founded in 1969 and was made a Fellow in the same year, becoming Professor of Computer Science in 1973. He subsequently became a Senior Fellow. When the internet was deployed in Ireland for the first time on 17 June 1991 by the Trinity campus company, IEunet, Byrne was a director. The first Irish Ethernet connection in Ireland was installed in the computer science department in Pearse Street. A large number of Byrne's students went on to found indigenous Irish software companies including Iona Technologies, Generics, and Cape Clear Technologies. He was also a founding member of the Irish Computer Society.

In 2005, Byrne supervised the masters' students who created the first digitised copy of the Library of Trinity College's 1872 Printed Catalogue. He advised on the Library's Stella Project in the 1990s which digitised the Library's periodicals card catalogue, and the Melon Project in the 2000s which was focused on the digitised Accessions Catalogue. Over the course of his career Byrne collected a large volume of books, publications, and collected examples of hard and software which has now become the core collection of the John Gabriel Byrne Computer Science Collection.

== Death and legacy ==
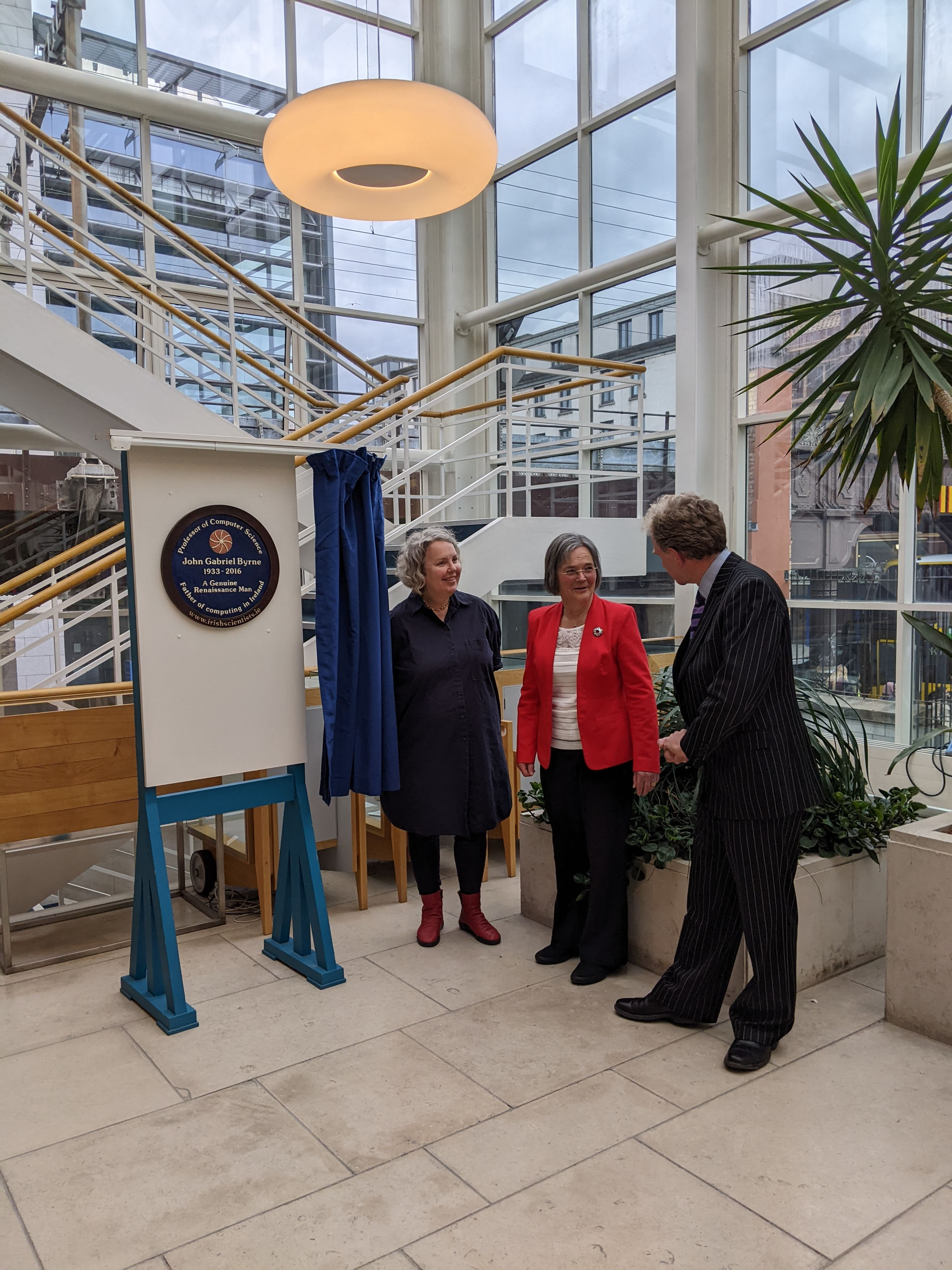
Provost Linda Doyle, Prof Jane Grimson, Pro-Chancellor and Prof Gregory O'Hare unveiling a plaque to Byrne at TCD, May 2022

Byrne retired from TCD in 2003. He died at a nursing home in Blackrock, Dublin on 16 April 2016.
