= Thomas Joseph Byrne =

- Born: 15 November 1876; Kingston upon Thames, Surrey, England
- Died: 27 January 1939 (aged 62); 11 Terenure Road, Rathgar, Dublin

Thomas Joseph Byrne (15 November 1876 – 27 January 1939) was an English architect, and was principal architect to the Office of Public Works in Ireland who oversaw the restoration of a large number of public buildings in Dublin following the Easter Rising, the Irish War of Independence and the Irish Civil War.

== Early life and family ==
Thomas Joseph Byrne was born in Kingston upon Thames, Surrey on 15 November 1876. His father, Richard Byrne (died c. 1876), was from Bagnelstown, County Carlow, and served with the Royal Irish Fusiliers. His mother, Harriet Byrne (née Knight), was English. On 29 August 1901, he married Mary Ellen Scott, elder daughter of Anthony Scott at the Pro-Cathedral in Dublin. They had at least two daughters and two sons. Both of their sons, Niall C. and T. Brendan, became engineers, and his daughter, Ethna, was a lecturer in Romance languages at University College Cork. Bryne was interested in mechanics, and was one of the first people in Ireland to own a car. He moved to 11 Terenure Road, Rathgar, Dublin in later life. He died suddenly of a heart attack at home on 27 January 1939, and is buried in Glasnevin Cemetery. Ethna presented some of the family papers to the Irish Architectural Archive. His grandson was the first professor of computer science in Trinity College Dublin, John Gabriel Byrne.

== Career ==
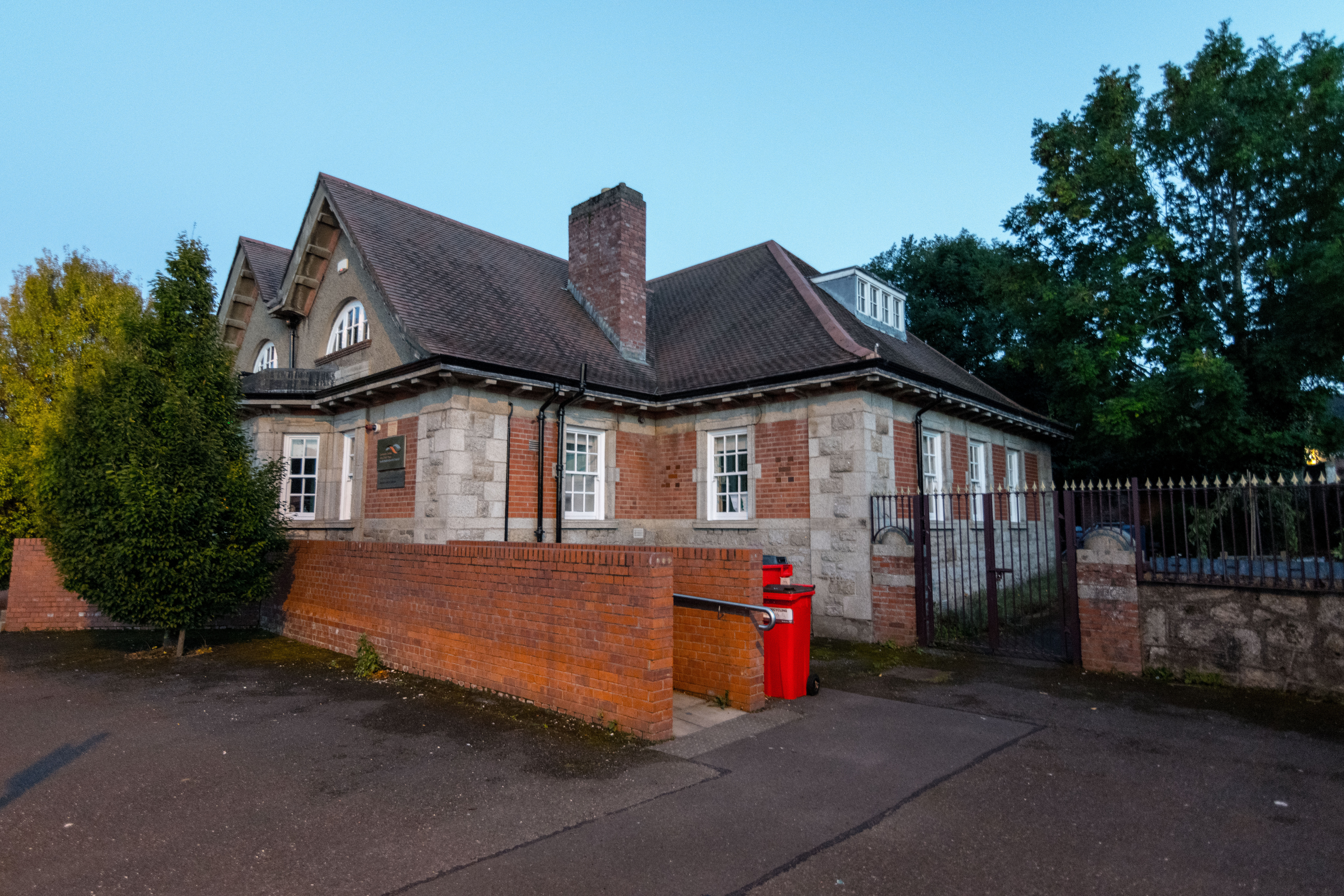
Whitechurch Library, designed by Byrne

In 1892, Byrne was articled to Edward Carter in London. He worked in Drogheda, County Louth in the office of Anthony Scott (1845–1919) from 1895 to 1899 before returning to Carter's office in London. Having passed his examinations, he went on to become an assistant architect with the London county council, designing hostel accommodation, fire stations, and Rowton houses. He even lived in the hostels he designed to test their suitability for those who lived in them, and this spurred his interest in housing.

From 1901 to 1919, he was both the clerk and architect to South Dublin rural district council. In this position he championed high standards in public housing in developments in areas including Chapelizod, Kilmainham, Rathfarnham, and Tallaght. He was heavily influenced by Arts and Crafts movement, using local building materials and designing economical but well built and carefully designed labourer's cottages. These houses included large rear gardens to allow for fruit and vegetable growing. He also designed the Carnegie libraries at Clondalkin, Whitechurch and Ballyboden. He was nominated by the Royal Institute of the Architects of Ireland (RIAI) around 1918 as one of their three assessors for an architectural competition for housing schemes funded by the government. From 1919 to 1923 he was a housing inspector for the local government board, and gained a reputation as the leading authority on small house planning. From 1923 to 1939 he was the principal architect to the board of public works. At a 1923 Swedish conference on housing and town planning, Byrne represented the Irish Free State.

Byrne oversaw the restoration of a large number of public buildings in Dublin that had been badly damaged during the period from 1916 to 1923. This included the GPO, the Four Courts, and the Custom House. For the Eucharistic Congress of 1932, he sat on the city decorations sub-committee, which saw him introduce floodlights to the Phoenix Park, for which he was awarded a gold medal for his service to the city. He collaborated with Edwin Lutyens on the planning of the War Memorial Park at Islandbridge, Dublin. When the Office of Public Works was given the task of building an airport outside Dublin, Byrne was in charge of selecting an architect, ultimately choosing Desmond FitzGerald and his team in 1936. He was also involved in the construction of Baldonnell and Rineanna (Shannon) airports.

He also lectured on architecture and served as an external examiner for architecture with the National University of Ireland. He was a member of the Industrial Research Council from 1936, and was first elected a member in 1915 and later a fellow in 1921 of the RIAI. Byrne served as a council member of the RIAI six times from 1923 to 1938, and as vice-president in 1926 and 1937. In 1900 he was elected to the Royal Institute of British Architects and became a member in 1914. He served as president of the Architectural Association of Ireland from 1923 to 1924, and was a member and council member of the Institution of Civil Engineers of Ireland. He was a founding member of the Institute of Christian Art in 1929, and served as vice-chairman from 1929 to 1939.
