= Orrin McClure =

American politician

New York State Assembly
- In office January 1, 1835 – December 31, 1835
- Preceded by: James Hall; Thomas A. Osborne
- Succeeded by: Thomas B. Campbell; Richard P. Marvin

Sheriff of Chautauqua County, New York
- In office 1843–1846
- Preceded by: Amos Muzzy
- Succeeded by: Jarvis Rice

Personal details
- Party: Whig
- Occupation: Politician

Orrin McClure was an American politician, sheriff, and inventor. He served one term in the New York State Assembly (1835) alongside John Woodward Jr. He went on to serve at the 12th sheriff of Chautauqua County, New York (1843–1846).

== Biography ==
McClure lived in Fredonia, New York. He married Dorinda Bennett and they had seven children.

He served as postmaster of Fredonia from July 30, 1827, to May 28, 1832.

He patented an improvement in saddles on March 25, 1840.

A member of the Whig Party, in 1834, McClure ran for New York State Assembly alongside John Woodward Jr. They went on to serve in the 58th New York State Legislature.

In 1843, at the county's Whig Party convention, he ran for Chautauqua County Clerk against Alvin Plumb and John G. Hinckley, and lost. At the same convention, he was nominated for Chautauqua County Sheriff, and won, defeating Charles Orton.
