= John Woodward Jr. =

American politician

New York State Assembly
- In office January 1, 1835 – December 31, 1835
- Preceded by: James Hall; Thomas A. Osborne
- Succeeded by: Thomas B. Campbell; Richard P. Marvin

Personal details
- Party: Whig
- Occupation: Politician

John Woodward Jr. was an American politician. He served one term in the New York State Assembly (1835) alongside Orrin McClure.

== Biography ==
Woodward was an early settler of Ellington, New York, purchasing land on lot 2 while his brother David settled on lot 2. He was Supervisor of the town from 1831-1834 and 1838 to 1840.

Woodward, a member of the Whig Party, was elected to the New York State Assembly in 1834 and served in the 58th New York State Legislature in 1835, alongside Orrin McClure.

Woodward's grandson was John M. Woodward, who was a New York Supreme Court Justice.
