= Vimbai Zimuto =

Zimbabwean, musician, dancer and choreographer (born 1983)

- Born: Vimbainashe Ashleghley Zimuto; 19 October 1983 (age 42); Chitungwiza, Zimbabwe
- Occupations: Musician, songwriter, dancer

Vimbai Zimuto (born 19 October 1983 at Chitungwiza) is a Zimbabwean, musician, dancer and choreographer based in Netherlands.

Zimuto plays the mbira and marimba, both traditional Zimbabwean musical instruments and also the traditional Zimbabwean percussion. She is a mother of two daughters and was once married to a Dutch national.

== Biography ==
Source: Vimbai Zimuto started playing mbira at the age of 12. She played tambourine in her school’s percussion band at the age of six and also joined a traditional dance group. Studying music in high school, Zimuto sang in the school choir, where they recorded a music album, Wedding Bells. Zimuto worked in several projects and participated in music programmes. She joined Oliver Mtukudzi and his Black Spirits, with whom she toured in the UK, USA and Canada. With the musical theatre show Daughters of Africa she also toured the Netherlands.

== Discography ==
Zimuto has two albums; Her music is often accompanied by a video, which she keeps on her Youtube channel.

- Kure Kwemeso (2015)
- Hapana Kwaunoenda (2018)

== Awards ==
In 2020, Zimuto was nominated for the Zimbabwe Music Awards under the Best Alternative category.

== Controversy ==
She has sparked controversy in Zimbabwe for posting nude pictures of herself on social media as she says nudity is her form of art.

In 2018, after a Kenya-bound Ethiopia Airlines plane from Ethiopia crashed six minutes after take-off in Addis Ababa killing all on board, Zimuto posted a nude picture of herself and captioned the image: "Ashes to Ashes, dust to dust. May all the people who perished on Ethiopian airlines rest in peace." She received backlash, and responded with another nude picture of herself.
