= I-500 =

The I-500 was an annual North American cross-country snowmobile race. The race was a 3-day event covering 500 miles (170 miles a day) and was sanctioned by the USCC Racing Association (USCC).

The first I-500 was race held in 1966, starting in Winnipeg, Manitoba and finished in Saint Paul, Minnesota. The race later started at the Seven Clans Casino in Thief River Falls, Minnesota, ran through the Red Lake Indian Reservation and finished back at the starting line. The I-500 was considered one of the most grueling events in snowmobile racing, along with the Iron Dog in Alaska. Ski-Doo racer Bryan Dyrdahl currently holds the Pro 600 record at the I-500 at 5 wins (2000, 2004, 2006, 2008, 2009). Arctic Cat racer Justin Morken currently holds the record as the youngest racer to ever finish the I-500 (14 years, 16 days old in 2007). On April 18, 2009, USCC Racing president Pat Mach announced at the USCC year-end awards ceremony in the Arrowood resort in Alexandria, Minnesota, that the USCC plans to race the original I-500 from Winnipeg to St. Paul in 2012. That would be the 40th anniversary for the I-500.
