= John Jenkins Cole =

English architect (1815–1897)

- Born: 25 March 1815; Plymouth, Devon, England
- Died: 10 May 1897 (aged 82); Sutton, London, England
- Burial place: West Norwood Cemetery
- Occupation: Architect
- Known for: Architect to the London Stock Exchange
- Children: Grenville Arthur James Cole

John Jenkins Cole FRIBA FRAS (25 March 1815 – 10 May 1897) was an English architect.

== Biography ==
Cole was born on 25 March 1815 in Devonport, Plymouth, the son of Robert Cole, a solicitor, and his wife, Mary. He was educated at Merchant Taylors' School.

Cole was originally trained as a solicitor, but soon moved into architecture, studying under Alfred Ainger. He was made a Fellow of the Royal Institute of British Architects (FRIBA) in 1848.

In 1855, Cole was elected architect to the London Stock Exchange, a role he retained for 35 years. In this role, he designed the Exchange's dome, new offices in Throgmorton Street and the frontage in Old Broad Street. He retired from the Institute in 1890.

Outside of his profession, Cole had a keen interest in astronomy and was elected a Fellow of the Royal Astronomical Society in 1862. He was also passionate about sanitary science, advocating for the erection of standpipes for drinking purposes and the abolition of the single cistern system that was in place at the time.

Twice married, Cole was the father of Grenville Arthur James Cole, a noted geologist, and Robert Langton Cole, who succeeded him as architect to the Stock Exchange.

He died at his home in Sutton on 10 May 1897 and was buried in West Norwood Cemetery.

== Notable works ==
- The church of St Mary, Abberley
- Sir Edmund Antrobus' house, Piccadilly
- Offices of the Gresham Life Assurance Society, opposite Mansion House.
