= Utah Seismic Safety Commission =

The Utah Seismic Safety Commission (USSC) is a legislatively created independent advisory board that tends to seismic-hazard issues in Utah, United States. The Utah legislature created the 15-member commission in 1994 to supersede the Utah Earthquake Advisory Board and to act as a medium "for state and local governments, the private sector, and the public to advance earthquake-related issues by developing, researching, and recommending seismic policies and approaches aimed at reducing Utah's earthquake hazards and managing Utah's earthquake risk."

The commission's mission statement is to "improve earthquake safety in Utah—to save lives, prevent injuries, protect property and the environment, and reduce social and economic disruption from earthquakes." The commission's volunteer members consist of leaders from various Utah governmental agencies and professional organizations and include a member from both the Utah House of Representatives and Senate. Key supporters of the commission include the Utah Department of Public Safety's Division of Emergency Management, the Utah Geological Survey, the University of Utah Seismograph Stations, and the Structural Engineers Association of Utah.

== History ==
Utah's first successful earthquake advisory council—the Utah Seismic Safety Advisory Council (USSAC)—was created in 1977. Its creation was the result of raised awareness caused by the 1975 magnitude 6.0 Pocatello Valley earthquake on the Utah-Idaho border that was felt throughout much of northern Utah, and a 1976 United States Geological Survey (USGS) study that reported the likelihood of a strong earthquake to strike the Salt Lake City area within the next century. The USSAC dissolved in 1981. Organized efforts to continue Utah public policy for earthquake safety continued with the Earthquake Task Force of the Utah Advisory Council on Intergovernmental Affairs (1989–1991) followed by the Utah Earthquake Advisory Board (UEAB) (1991–1994).

The USSC replaced the UEAB when it was created in July 1994 with the passage of Utah House Bill 358. In January 1995, the USSC published A Strategic Plan for Earthquake Safety in Utah that represents the state's formalized efforts to reduce losses in future earthquakes. The Strategic Plan contains 33 strategies grouped under the following five objectives:

1. Increase earthquake awareness and education
2. Improve emergency response and recovery
3. Improve the seismic safety of buildings and infrastructure
4. Improve essential geoscience information
5. Assess earthquake risk

== Activities ==
The goals of the USSC today are to facilitate the implementation of the Strategic Plan and to keep it up to date while remaining "actively engaged in trying to protect the citizens and economy of Utah before the next damaging earthquake hits." The USSC acts as a community outreach organization and has had success educating "the public, the business community, and school children to both understand the risks facing them and their communities and to act responsibly by adopting loss reduction measures."

Accomplishments of the USSC include co-sponsoring technical conferences focused on geologic hazards, establishing a student research grant program, helping to implement seismic building codes, helping to manage a post-earthquake technical clearinghouse plan, raising awareness of the dangers of unreinforced masonry structures and older school buildings, helping to expand Utah's seismic monitoring network, co-developing Putting Down Roots in Earthquake Country—a non-technical handbook for earthquake safety in Utah, and supporting the development of a statewide HAZUS (Hazards U.S. loss estimation program) risk analysis.
