= John Cole (photographer) =

English fashion and advertising photographer

John Barry Pierpoint Cole (14 July 1923 – 23 February 1995) was an English fashion and advertising photographer.

== Early life ==
John Cole was born in Edmonton, Middlesex on 14 July 1923, to parents George Robert, an art director with his own design studio G R Cole, and Ethel Grace Pairpoint (known as Susan) Cole, née Silk, housewife (whose family were silversmiths). The family lived at Oak Beams, The Green, Old Southgate, London N14, and Cole attended The Beacon School near Bexhill, a boarding school, and Westminster School.

== Photography ==
Cole joined the photographic film manufacturer Ilford as an apprentice trainee, although he was soon dismissed on the grounds that it did not suit his condition. He was filmed by British Pathe loading the camera while working at Gee and Watson and later on, he worked with Hugh White Studio.

== Studio Five ==
By 1955 Cole was working with his older brother Kenneth at their camera shop and photographic studio in North London. Cole set up a studio in London's West End to focus on fashion photography, with a business partner Douglas Clarke.

Studio Five "Photography for Advertising" was located in Shepherd Market Mayfair, London, England, at 5d Shepherd House, Shepherd Street, Mayfair, London W1 where there was a generous basement and a small sunlit studio on the ground floor, until the business ran into financial difficulty in 1968.

Studio Five became a place in London for young photographers to develop their skills; photographers Norman Eales, Vic Singh, John French, Tony Rawlinson, David Mist, Peter Ogden, Brian Duffy, Gavin Davis, Gorden Carter, Derek Weston, Robert Dibue, Laurence Sackman (who worked later for Harper's Bazaar) David Bailey, Vernon Dewhurst, Jeremy Bailey, David Radley, Michael Claydon (who had a relationship with model Joanna Lumley who was photographed at Studio Five) all produced work at Studio Five.

David Bailey was a photographer from May 1960 for Studio Five, before being contracted as a fashion photographer for British Vogue magazine later that year. Model Jean Shrimpton, in her book said of David Bailey at Studio Five:

"It was while I was at Studio Five working for Norman [Eales] just before Christmas that I noticed a young black-eyed photographer in jeans who was introduced to me as David Bailey. He was quite flattering."

In his book Ready, steady, go! : the smashing rise and giddy fall of Swinging London, Shawn Levy wrote:

"It was in the Daily Express, in fact, that Bailey published his first really important photo--an image of the model Paulene Stone wearing a dark knee-length skirt and a bright turtleneck mohair sweater and crouching on the leaf-strewn ground to commune with a squirrel, who was nibbling on an ort. Terence Donovan, who didn't yet know Bailey, was among the people who reacted strongly to the image, pronouncing himself "disturbed by its freshness and its oblique quality." On the strength of that shot and a few other striking pictures, Bailey found himself hired in May 1960, as a full-fledged photographer at John Cole's Studio Five, earning thirty to forty pounds a week."

Shrimpton wrote that she began to get bookings with Norman Eales at Studio Five late in 1960:

"He persevered with my inexperience and even volunteered the information to the Evening Standard that I would be the new face of 1961."

Brian Duffy also photographed Shrimpton at Studio Five in 1961 (for Kellogg's Cornflakes).

Many of the top fashion models of the 1960s were photographed including Twiggy, (Cole appeared in the BBC Documentary Twiggy, the face of the 60s, photographing Twiggy outside St Pancras Station in London), Joanna Lumley, Grace Coddington, Pattie Boyd, Paulene Stone, Linda Keith, Georgia Gold, Caroline Saunders, Shakira Baksh, Victoria Vaughan, Celia Hammond, Dorothy Bond, Jill Kennington, Suzy Kendall, (who married Dudley Moore the comedian and pianist who was a regular visitor to Studio Five) Jenny Hanley, Norman Scott (who was involved in the Jeremy Thorpe scandal) Ros Watkins, Ted Hemming, and Liese Deniz.

Notable customers of Studio Five were many of the top London advertising agencies (including Kingsley Manton & Palmer, C.P.V. International, Manchester-based Osborne Peacock, Fletcher/Forbes/Gill design studio), many top fashion magazines (including Tatler, Bystander, Country Life, Flair, Record, Vanity Fair, She, Hairdressers Journal) and many national newspapers (including Daily Mail, Evening Standard, Guardian, Evening News, Daily Express, Sunday Times). The Studio also worked for fashion houses Mary Quant, Poly Peck, Wearwell, and Slimma

Photographer Vic Singh noted:

Studio Five became a popular and famous London studio at that time. With the young photographers “doing their thing” seeing in the birth of the “Swinging 60’s” a mix of fashion, music and industry. I worked in one of the studios or outside in Shepherd's Market, weather permitting. Lunchtime was usually spent in a cafe in the market and in the evening with a friend who lived next to the studio called George Hastings, Dudley Moore would arrive and play the piano with George on the double bass. Dudley had a jazz group in the early 60’s called The Dudley Moore Trio who played in a West End jazz club.

Studio Five became a place for young photographers to develop their skills supervised by John Cole, as described by Howard Grey, photographer:

"John sort of wrote 'The Book' for all the London Photographers who followed him - Bailey, Duffy and Donovan”.

== After Studio Five ==
In 1970 Cole set up a new (eponymous) studio at 17 Brick Street Mayfair London W1, which carried on in business until 23 December 1983.

== In popular culture ==
Photographing Fashion - British Style in 60s (ISBN 9781851496006) by Richard Lister. Section headed "The genius of Studio Five".

Jennifer Juniper by Jenny Boyd (ISBN 9781912666614) uses a photograph taken by John Cole.
