= Jack Coles (footballer) =

Australian rules footballer (1886–1951)

Personal information
- Full name: John David Coles
- Born: 7 September 1886; Richmond, Victoria
- Died: 29 July 1951 (aged 64); Kew, Victoria
- Original team: Collingwood Juniors
- Position: half-forward

Playing career^{1}
Years	Club	Games (Goals)
1908, 1910, 1912	Northcote (VFA)	22 (2)
1909	Richmond (VFL)	3 (2)
Total		25 (4)

Representative team honours
Years	Team	Games (Goals)
1912	Victoria (VFA)	2
- ^{1} Playing statistics correct to the end of 1912.

John David Coles (7 September 1886 – 29 July 1951) was an Australian rules footballer who played with Richmond in the Victorian Football League (VFL).

== Family ==
The son of John Joseph Coles (1855-), and Margaret Coles, née Irvine, John David Coles was born at Richmond, Victoria on 7 September 1886.

He married Olive Victoria Lavinia Queenie Black (1889–1976) in 1908.

== Football ==
=== Northcote (VFA) ===
He played for the Northcote Football Club in the Victorian Football Association (VFA) in 1908 (2 matches), 1910 (3 matches), in 1912 (17 matches), and also played two matches for a VFA representative team in 1912.

=== Richmond (VFL) ===
He played three matches for the Richmond First XVIII; the first against Collingwood on 24 July 1909, and the last against South Melbourne on 14 August 1909.

== Death ==
He died (suddenly) at his residence at Kew, Victoria on 29 July 1951.
