= Jack A. Cole =

Retired Detective Lieutenant for the New Jersey State Police

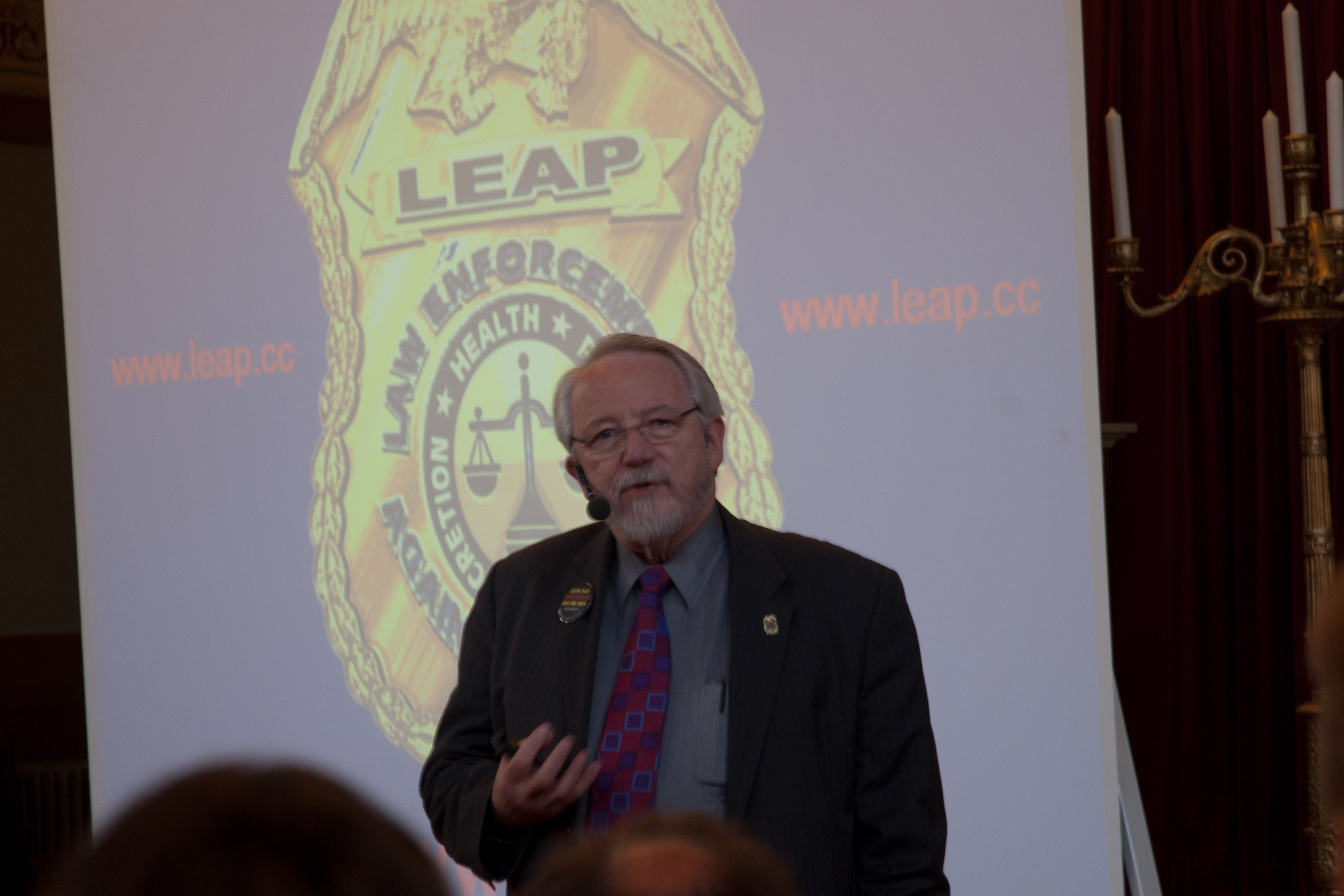
- Born: October 9, 1938 (age 87)
- Education: University of Massachusetts Boston
- Occupation: Undercover police detective
- Known for: Law Enforcement Action Partnership

Jack A. Cole (born October 9, 1938) is a retired Detective Lieutenant who worked for the New Jersey State Police for 26 years. For twelve of those years, he worked as an undercover narcotics officer. Cole was the first executive director of Law Enforcement Against Prohibition, now known as Law Enforcement Action Partnership (LEAP), an organization comprising former and current police officers, government agents and other law enforcement agents who advocate for justice reform and oppose the war on drugs. Cole served as LEAP's executive director from 2002–2010.

== Early life and education ==
Cole attended Wichita High School East and received a master's degree from University of Massachusetts Boston. He further holds a degree in Criminal Justice and a master's degree in Public Policy from the University of Massachusetts.

== Life and activism ==
Jack Cole has taught courses to police recruits and veteran officers on ethics, integrity, moral decision-making, and the detrimental effects of racial profiling. Cole and his wife reside in Boston, Massachusetts.

Cole has spoken internationally for LEAP, and has written several articles about drug policy reform. Cole believes race and gender bias by police, police brutality, and corruption in law enforcement can begin to be solved by ending drug prohibition.
