= John B. Cole =

American quantitative geneticist and animal scientist

John B. Cole Ph.D.
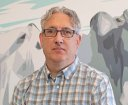
- Education: Louisiana State University (Ph.D.)
- Known for: Dairy cattle genetic evaluation; genomic selection; selection indices
- Awards: Jay L. Lush Award in Breeding and Genetics; Distinguished Service Award (National Dairy Herd Information Association); Peer Research Award (National Association of Animal Breeders)
- Scientific career
- Fields: Quantitative genetics; Animal breeding; Genomics
- Workplaces: Council on Dairy Cattle Breeding (CDCB); United States Department of Agriculture (USDA), Animal Genomics and Improvement Laboratory (AGIL); PEAK Genetics
- Website: www.johnbcole.com

John B. Cole is an American quantitative geneticist and animal scientist who specializes in dairy cattle genetics, genomic evaluation, and animal breeding systems. He is known for research and leadership roles supporting the development and implementation of genetic evaluation programs used in the dairy industry.

As of 2024, Cole has served as Chief Research and Development Officer at the Council on Dairy Cattle Breeding (CDCB).

== Early life and education ==
Cole earned a Doctor of Philosophy (Ph.D.) in animal breeding and genetics from Louisiana State University.

== Career ==
=== USDA ===
Cole spent more than 17 years at the United States Department of Agriculture's Animal Genomics and Improvement Laboratory (AGIL), where he worked as a research geneticist and served as acting research leader. His work included research on genomic selection, fertility and health traits, pedigree analysis, and genetic defects in dairy cattle. "John B. Cole". Peak Genetics.

=== Industry roles ===
After his USDA career, Cole joined PEAK Genetics and served as Senior Vice President of Research and Development, leading research related to cattle genetics and reproductive technologies.

In March 2024, Cole was appointed Chief Research and Development Officer at CDCB, overseeing research strategy and the development of U.S. national dairy cattle genetic evaluations.

== Research and contributions ==
Cole has authored and co-authored peer-reviewed research in animal breeding, quantitative genetics, and dairy science, with work focusing on genomic evaluation methods, economic selection indices, and improvement of fertility, health, and longevity traits in dairy cattle.

He has also contributed to software and analytical tools used in pedigree analysis, including involvement with the open-source pedigree analysis project PyPedal.

== Awards and honors ==
Cole has received professional recognition for contributions to breeding and genetics, including the Jay L. Lush Award in Breeding and Genetics, a Distinguished Service Award from the National Dairy Herd Information Association, and a Peer Research Award from the National Association of Animal Breeders in 2020.

== Selected works ==
- Bohmanova, J.; Misztal, I.; Cole, J. B. (April 1, 2007). "Temperature-Humidity Indices as Indicators of Milk Production Losses due to Heat Stress". Journal of Dairy Science. 90 (4): 1947–1956. doi:10.3168/jds.2006-513. ISSN 0022-0302.
