= Saikoro Fiction =

Japanese role-playing game universal system

Saikoro Fiction (Japanese: サイコロ・フィクション, lit. "Dice Fiction"; abbreviated "SF") is a Japanese role-playing game universal system developed by Touichirou Kawasima and presented by Adventure Planning Service (Bouken Kikaku-Kyoku).

== Core mechanics ==
Saikoro Fiction requires one or more six-sided dice to play. The character sheets for each game have a "Skill table" for judgment rolls. The skill table is composed of rows of skills numbered 2–12, arranged under six associated attributes. This allows for a total of 66 skills, which differ for each game that uses the system. For example, the coordinates of "Death" is 6-12 in "Magicalogia", but 6-5 in "inSANe". The adjoining cell is mostly a relationship skill (word). Narrow gaps are left between the attribute columns.

A fictitious table is given below for the purpose of explanation:

	1:Strength	A	2:Dexterity	B	3:Educate	C	4:Guessingly	D	5:Constitution	E	6:Charisma
2	Lifting		Secrecy		Zoology		Discovery		Drug Tolerance		Bluff
3	Grip		Stealth		Botany		Searching		Defense		Coercion
4	Martial Arts		Lock Picking		Architectonics		Crisis Perception		Patience		Temptation
5	Destruction		Removing		Language		Reasoning		Paralysis Tolerance		Negotiation
6	Throwing		Slashing		Physics		Observation		Health		Inspiration
7	Climbing		Stabbing		chemistry		Fathom		Survival		Faith
8	Transportation		Juggling		Occultism		Diagnosis		Diving		Art
9	Jump		Sleight		Strategy		Listen		Suffocation		Empathy
10	Sprint		Avoidance		Economics		Lip Reading		Hunger		Pray
11	Armor		Parry		Politics		Tracking		Recovery		Speech
12	Digging		Escape		Geoscience		Tailing		Long-distance Running		Domination

When the player creates a playable character, they select the player character's "Strong Skills" (特技) according to the rules of the game. In some cases, the player can fill some gaps in the table. On the above table, the parts highlighted in black indicate the player character's strong skills, and gap D is filled.

When a character makes a judgment roll in this system, the Gamemaster designates an "Assignment skill" (指定特技) which determines a target number for success. Players use two six-sided dice (2d6) and must roll a sum equal to or higher than the target number to succeed in the judgment role. When the assignment skill is one of the player character's strong skills, the target number is 5; otherwise the target number is 5 plus the number of cells on the table (including unfilled gap cells) between the assignment skill and the closest strong skill. Incidentally, the skills table may usually not have joined attribute 6 to attribute 1, and cell 12 to cell 2. For example, on the above table, the target number of "Domination" is 7, "Recovery" is 8, and "Paralysis Tolerance" is 7. The skill table's coordinates may be used to randomize an Assignment skill.

Saikoro Fiction's game sessions proceed under the "scene system" (ja) (cf. Standard RPG System#Scene system).

== Games that use Saikoro Fiction ==
- Neighborhood Märchen TRPG: Peek a boo (ja)
- Shinobigami (ja) (English official page)
- Hunters Moon (ja)
- Grimoire Great War TRPG:Magicalogia (ja)
- Blood Crusade (ja)
- Card Ranker (ja)
- Multi genre horror TRPG: inSANe (ja)
- Reality Show RPG: Kill Death Business (ja)
- Horror action TRPG: Blood moon - This rule integrated Hunters Moon with Blood Crusade.
- KanColle RPG
- Beginning Idol
