= USCC Racing Association =

The USCC Racing Association (USCC) was a sponsor for cross country snowmobile racing in the United States from 2002 to 2012. Its races primarily took place in the midwest: Minnesota, Wisconsin, North Dakota and Michigan. The USCC was founded in 2002 by former ISOC professional snowmobile racer Pat Mach. The USCC hosted the famed International 500 (or commonly referred to as the "I-500") which is by far the most publicized cross-country snowmobile race in the circuit and the lower 48 states of the United States.

USCC had corporate sponsors for all the events, which included: Arctic Cat, Polaris, Yamaha, ArcticFX, Brothers Motorsports, Seven Clans Casino, FOX Racing Shox, FXR, Studboy among others.
