= Jon Cole (businessman) =

American businessman

Personal details
- Born: Dallas, Texas
- Education: University of Texas at Austin(B.A.); University of Texas School of Law (J.D.); Georgetown University
- Occupation: Businessman and attorney

Jon Cole is a businessman in Texas, United States. He previously served as an aide at White House ONDCP and the Texas House of Representatives.

== Personal ==
Cole grew up in Collin County. He later attended the University of Texas at Austin and the University of Texas School of Law. He also studied economics at Georgetown University.

Cole is currently CEO of Rally.org Cole was a finance attorney and partner in a Dallas merchant banking firm.

== Staffer ==
Jon Cole served as a legislative aide to the Chairman of Appropriations Jim Pitts of the Texas House of Representatives under Speaker Tom Craddick. Following service at the Texas Capitol, Cole served as an aide in the White House Office of National Drug Control Policy in the Office of the United States Drug Czar. Previous to that, he was an intern for Governor Rick Perry in the Governor's Criminal Justice Division.

== 2008 Campaign ==
Cole, a 23-year-old law student, challenged the 16-year incumbent to represent Texas House District 67 in the Texas House of Representatives, Jerry Madden, in the 2008 election. At the time, he said that the effort was due to Madden's "catch and release" policies with criminals and his lack of leadership for the district. At the time, Jerry Madden was Corrections chairman under Speaker Tom Craddick. At the time, Cole was endorsed by numerous District Attorneys and local leaders. Cole lost to the Madden by 256 votes.

== Policy Work ==
Jon Cole has been an active in Texas Criminal Justice Policy. Cole has worked as volunteer state coordinator for a Texas anti-Drug organization which fought Senate Bill 1818 in 2011. He was also one of 12 appointed by Senator Florence Shapiro to serve on the K2 Task Force banning synthetic narcotics in Texas. In 2010, he was awarded the Drug Free America Foundation's highest honor for supporting anti-drug issues and supporting drug prevention and law enforcement. Jon has been featured as a speaker at the Southwest Prevention Center Training Institute.
