= Julia Moulden =

Canadian author, speaker, speechwriter and communications consultant

Julia Moulden is a Canadian author, speaker, speechwriter and communications consultant who is based in Toronto, Ontario. She has published three books and has written and been featured in several periodicals, newspapers and other media.

== Career ==
Julia Moulden's first book was a bestseller about the emerging ecological trend. Green is gold (HarperBusiness, 1991), the first environmental management guide for business, was published in six countries.

In 2007, McGraw-Hill published We Are the New Radicals: A Manifesto for Reinventing Yourself and Saving the World, of which Moulden is the sole author. The book relates the story of the movement of baby boomers who aren't interested in traditional retirement, but are eager to do 'good works' instead. The book has been translated into three languages.

Ripe is Moulden's latest project and was published in March 2011.

Moulden has written for a variety of publications, including The Globe and Mail, Financial Post, Toronto Life, Harrowsmith, and Ms.

Moulden has appeared as a featured speaker at Salon Voltaire. and is a regular contributor to the Huffington Post. She has been published in the Rotman School of Management magazine. She has been featured on CITY-TV, The Globe and MailVideo, TVOntario and CBC Radio.

== See Also ==
- List of Canadian writers
