= Dartmouth Square =

Victorian residential square in Dublin, Ireland

- Cearnóg Dartmouth
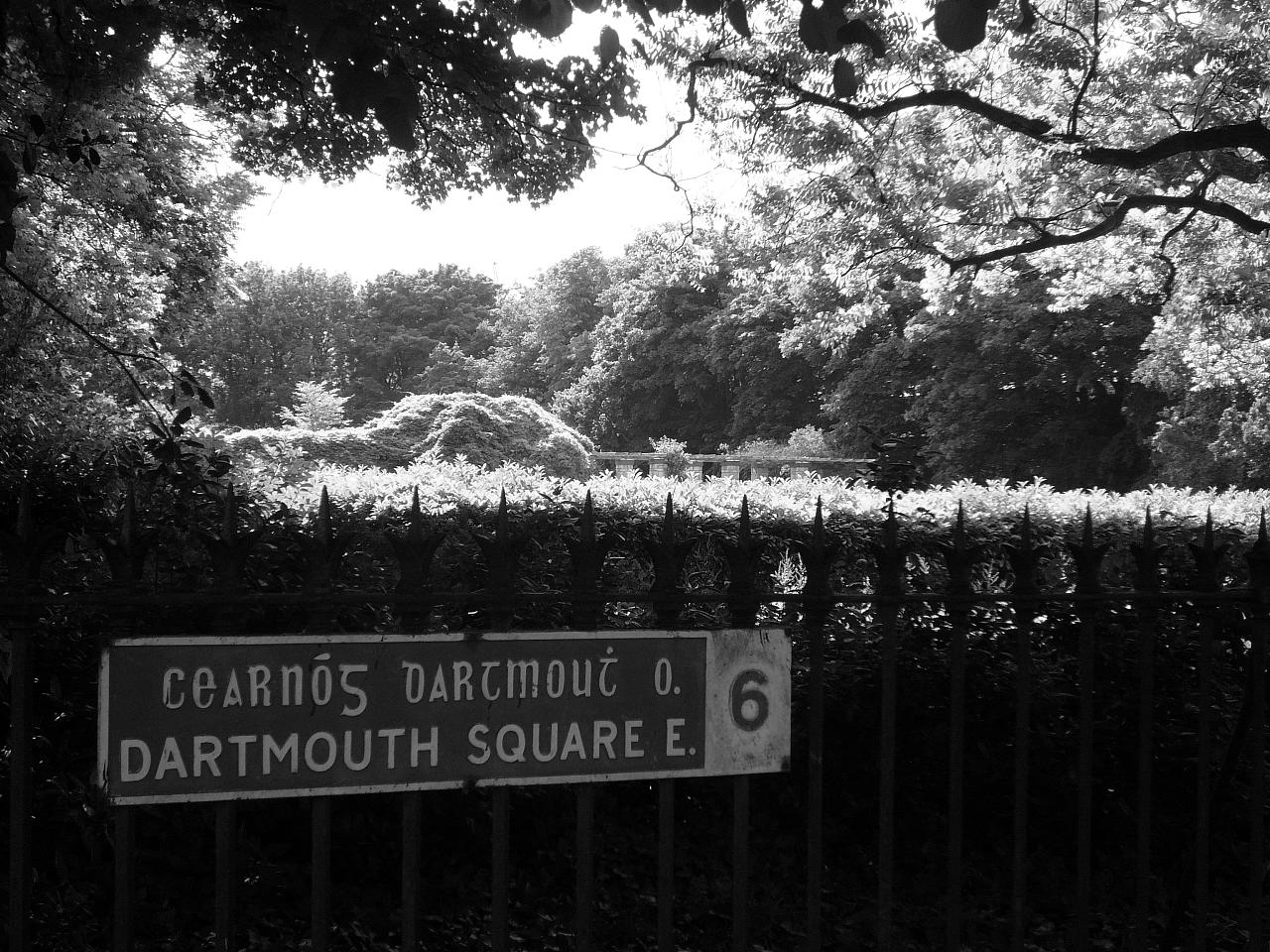
- Dartmouth Square in June 2008
- Interactive map of Dartmouth Square
- Type: Garden Square
- Location: Dublin, Ireland
- OSI/OSNI grid: O 16266 32509
- Coordinates: 53.330281°N 6.255374°W
- Area: 2 acres (0.81 hectares)
- Operator: Dublin City Council

Dartmouth Square (Irish: Cearnóg Dartmouth) is a Victorian Garden square located near Ranelagh, in Dublin, Ireland. It has a simple rectangular layout, including a low granite plinth wall, a pergola and its walkway, and broadleaf mature trees which enclose the space. The park boundary is marked by the original wrought iron railings and gates.

== History ==
The square was originally part of the Darley Estate. The park was developed along with the surrounding terraces of red brick houses, and was intended for private use by the residents.

When the maintenance of the park became a financial burden to the residents of the square, it was leased to Loreto Hockey Club - in 1926 - for use as a hockey pitch for alumni. Later, it was used by current students of the Loreto College, St Stephen's Green. Differing accounts say that hockey was either played in the square until the 1950s, or that it stopped in the 1930s, when it became harder to maintain. The park began to decline and was overgrown.

In 1987, the Residents Association approached Dublin Lord Mayor, Mrs Carmencita Hederman, which in turn led to the City Manager, Mr Frank Feely, and his office working with the community to make the park a Dublin Millennium Year project. The park was cleaned, a new pergola was erected, paths were realigned and widened, and flower beds were planted. The public park was opened and Dublin City Council opened a ten year lease. The construction and cleanup work was completed in 1988.

The lease expired in 1997, and talks took place between Dublin City Council and the Darley Estate while Dublin City Council continued to maintain the park.

=== Controversy ===
The square became the subject of controversy in 2005, when it emerged that years previously, businessman Noel O'Gara, bought the freehold on the square for £10,000 from PJ Darley, a descendant of the square's builders. O'Gara locked the gates on the park in the square in 2006. He tried to operate it as a car park but local residents blocked the gates. After 3 years of dispute with residents and Dublin City Council an agreement was negotiated with Noel O'Gara by a local resident to reopen the square to be used as an amenity again. The local community gathered regularly to clean up the square which was in a state of ruin after years with no maintenance.

In December 2012, the square was sold at auction on instruction of the liquidator of Marble Tile and Granite. A group of local residents bought the square at this auction and donated it back to DCC. Noel O'Gara protested at the sale, though the property was eventually sold to Dublin City Council for €142,000, with a contribution of €32,000 from local residents. The square is now wholly owned by Dublin City Council.

=== Notable residents ===
Luke Kelly of the Dubliners folk group lived in at no.7 Dartmouth Square. The artist Pauline Bewick refers to his house at a time when she was romantically involved with him.

In addition there it is claimed that the following were born or resided there:

- No. 23, Alfred (Alfie) Byrne, Lord Mayor of Dublin
- No. 51, Frank Duff, founder of the Legion of Mary
- No. 57, Paul Durcan, poet, was born at this house
- No. 61, Micheal MacLiammoir, actor and playwright and Hilton Edwards, actor and producer
- No. 62, Thomas Lopdell O'Shaughnessy, the son of the last Recorder for Dublin
- Barry Fitzgerald (William Joseph Shields), an Oscar winning actor.
- Donagh MacDonagh, writer, playwright and broadcaster
