= United States Stove Company =

- Company type: Private
- Industry: Heating, Residential Wood Stove, Residential Pellet Stoves
- Founded: Perry Stove Works – Albany, NY (1869) United States Stove Co. – South Pittsburg (1930)
- Founder: John S. Perry
- Headquarters: South Pittsburg, Tennessee
- Area served: North and South America
- Products: Residential wood stoves, residential pellet stoves,
- Owner: Richard Rogers, August SL Jones
- Number of employees: 150
- Website: www.usstove.com

United States Stove Company is an American manufacturer based in South Pittsburg, Tennessee that produces residential wood burning and pellet burning stoves and sells stove accessories and parts. Founded in 1869 by John S. Perry and S.L Rogers, the United States Stove Company is one of the largest manufacturers of both wood and pellet stoves in the United States, with its headquarters located in South Pittsburg, Tennessee.

== History ==
=== 19th century historical origins ===
John S. Perry started building wood stoves in 1843. After becoming bankrupt in 1860, Perry secured a loan in the amount of $13,000 to buy the company in 1862. Perry reorganized the company to become Albany Stove Works in 1869. It employed nearly 1,200 people in the Albany region.

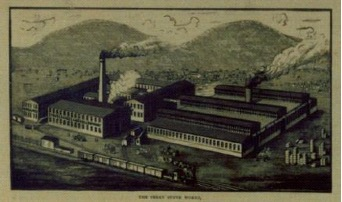
Perry Stove Manufacturing Company

In June 1886, a new foundry was built in South Pittsburg along the banks of the Tennessee River. More than 500 men were hired to work in what then became known as the Perry Stove Manufacturing Company. The company faced a difficult start almost immediately upon opening. In June 1888, the factory was nearly destroyed by fire. Months later, a boiler explosion killed six men.

=== 20th century ===
In 1902, H. Wetter Manufacturing, a competitor based in Memphis, Tennessee, suffered a major fire that destroyed their primary factory. Rather than rebuild, H. Wetter Manufacturing purchased the South Pittsburg factory and merged their production into the existing facility. From 1902 until 1929, the company was known as H. Wetter Manufacturing. The H. Wetter Manufacturing Company operated the company for 25 years until a historic union strike on December 25, 1927. Following several tumultuous years marked by an ongoing labor dispute, law officers and guards for the company faced off in a gun battle. The shootout resulted in the deaths of six law officers, including then Sheriff of Marion County, Washington Coppinger. In 1929, H. Wetter Manufacturing was forced to close its doors until it was reorganized and reopened by a group of local businessmen led by S.L. Rogers in 1930. The newly reorganized company was named the United States Stove Company. Since then, the company has been owned and operated by the Rogers family. Current Chairman of the Board, Richard Rogers and current President, August Jones are the third and fourth generations of the family to lead the company, respectively.

=== EPA crackdown ===
The 1980s also brought changes in the industry with the passage of New Source Performance Standard for Wood Heaters under the Clean Air Act. For the first time, solid fuel appliance emissions would be regulated, which required U.S. Stove to make significant investments in new technology and engineering.

== Current operations ==
Today, the United States Stove Company produces a full range of heating appliances across various fuel types including wood, pellet, coal, liquid propane, natural gas, kerosene and diesel fuels. The company holds over 25 U.S. patents and approximately 80 registered brand names.

== Acquisitions ==
In 1994, U.S. Stove acquired Clayton Manufacturing followed by Jensen Manufacturing in 1996. The company acquired the Ashley division of Martin Industries in 1998 and Vogelzang International in 2012. In 2019, U.S. Stove launched Powerfast Product Group, USSC Grills and Acadia Hearth, which acquired Breckwell.

== Brands ==
- Acadia Hearth
- Ashley Hearth Products
- Breckwell
- NewMac
- United States Stove

== See also ==
- List of stoves
- South Pittsburg, Tennessee
