= Rally.org =

- Predecessor: Piryx
- Founded: Austin, Texas, United States (2009, rebranded 2011)
- Founders: Tom Serres; Brian Upton; Jonas Lamis; Naveed Lalani
- Headquarters: San Francisco, United States
- Area served: United States, Europe
- Services: Fundraising platform
- Website: rally.org

Rally.org is an American social online fundraising platform for use by a wide range of individuals and organizations. It allows users to set up their own fundraising page, through which supporters can find information about their campaigns and make donations through Rally.org's proprietary payment system. The platform is best known for its use by causes including the Make A Wish Foundation and Jon Bon Jovi's Hurricane Sandy relief effort, filmmakers including the director of Buzkashi Boys, and political campaigns in the United States 2012 election cycle. In May 2012, Rally.org closed the largest Series A round of venture capital ever raised online. The company was founded in Austin, Texas, as Piryx, in 2009 by Tom Serres, Brian Upton, Jonas Lamis and Naveed Lalani.

== Background ==
Rally.org is a free online social fundraising or crowdfunding platform with a built-in proprietary payment system, which is used by individuals and organizations to raise money for their causes. The platform may be used for ongoing fundraising as well as for one-time initiatives. Rally.org can be used by organizations and individuals including charities, entrepreneurs, filmmakers, students, political campaigns, and social causes. Fundraisers can use the platform to create a page about their cause, which the site refers to as a "Rally", and collect money through the platform's payment-processing system. They can also share their story through content including photos, video and blog entries. Through a feature called Covers, Rally.org allows fundraisers to embed a link for donation into their videos and images. These can then be shared via social media, allowing fundraisers to promote their campaigns. Additionally, Rally.org's platform analyzes how users respond to individual posts and provides data analytics tools for fundraisers to analyze their campaigns' effectiveness.

The proprietary payment system developed by Rally.org processes payments directly, rather than needing to use a third party payments platform such as PayPal or Amazon. Additionally, the system offers one-click payment functionality, which allows individuals donating through Rally.org to make multiple donations to different causes and campaigns without having to re-enter their payment information. Although the platform is free to use by fundraisers, the company takes 5.75 percent commission from each donation made through the site. This commission includes Rally.org's payments to credit card companies. Fundraisers do not need to meet a predetermined goal to receive their donations and are able to raise funds on an ongoing basis if they choose.

In addition to the fundraising platform, Rally.org offers space within its San Francisco headquarters for rent at a subsidized rate to non-profits and socially conscious entrepreneurs. The incubator is called RallyPad, and includes mentorship and other benefits. The company also operates a similar startup incubator in Berlin.

As of February 2013, the site had approximately 4.6 million total users, including donors, charitable causes and political campaigns. The company is based in San Francisco and is led by chief executive officer Jon Cole. It also has offices in New York City and Berlin, Germany and has approximately 23 employees.

== History ==
=== Piryx ===
Tom Serres developing the precursor company, Piryx, in 2009 with co-founders Brian Upton Jonas Lamis and Naveed Lalani, originally as a platform to help political campaigns raise money online. According to Serres, the company's initial aim was to provide a service similar to PayPal, but customized for political fundraising. It was developed as a nonpartisan fundraising platform to be used by political candidates at all levels. The platform allowed donors to make payments directly to a campaign's bank account, and included an app that tracked donations and reported them to the Federal Election Commission. It also included features that campaigns could use to set up a webpage or fundraising tool via a Facebook group.

=== Relaunch and venture funding ===
In June 2011, the company announced that it was rebranding as Rally.org and widening the scope of its platform to a broad range of organizations and individuals, such as charities, filmmakers and students, in addition to political campaigns and candidates. Prior to the relaunch, the company moved its headquarters from Austin to San Francisco.

In June 2012, the company announced that it had raised $7.9 million in its first Series A round of venture capital funding. The funding was raised online through AngelList and was the largest round of Series A venture capital ever raised online. Investors included Greylock Partners, Mike Maples of Floodgate Fund, Michael Birch, Tim Ferriss, Eric Ries and Google Ventures. Investing in Rally.org was Kevin Rose's first investment as a partner at Google Ventures. Serres stated that the company would use the funding to scale the business, hire more engineers and expand into Europe.

In 2012, during the U.S. presidential and congressional elections, the non-partisan platform was used by Governor Mitt Romney's presidential campaign in the general election as its only fundraising platform, as well as by Mayor Julian Castro and Senator Elizabeth Warren. Rally.org was also the platform used for Jon Bon Jovi’s hurricane relief campaign raising funds to rebuild New Jersey communities following Hurricane Sandy.

The company announced the launch of its platform in Europe in February 2013. The global payment system will process transactions in 17 currencies, starting with donations in euros. It also established a new office and startup incubator in Berlin.

Also in February 2013, Rally.org introduced a new feature called Covers, which allows fundraisers to add a video link or image about their cause to their donation form. The new Covers feature was used by film director Sam French to raise money for the two Afghan actors in his film Buzkashi Boys to attend the Academy Awards.

== Recognition ==
Campaigns and Elections named Piryx in 2011 and Rally.org in 2012 as the "Best Online Fundraising Tool". Also in 2012, the magazine named Rally.org the "Most Innovative Product of the Year" and named Tom Serres one of its 2012 CampaignTech Innovators for creating Rally.org. In 2013, Forbes included Rally.org in its list of "America's Most Promising Companies".
