= Jonathan Cole (British Army officer) =

British Army general

Major General Jonathan Cole CB OBE
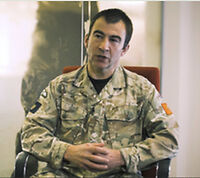
- Born: 1967 (age 58–59)
- Education: Cranfield University
- Military career
- Allegiance: United Kingdom
- Branch: British Army
- Service years: 1987–2022
- Rank: Major General
- Unit: Royal Signals
- Commands: 11th Signal Brigade; 2nd Signal Regiment
- Awards: Companion of the Order of the Bath; Officer of the Order of the British Empire

Major General Jonathan James Cole, CB, OBE (born 1967) is a retired senior British Army officer, who served as the Director of Information at Army Command from 2018 to 2021.

== Military career ==
Cole was commissioned into the Royal Signals on 8 August 1987. He was appointed an Officer of the Order of the British Empire in the 2008 New Year Honours. He served as commander of the 11th Signal Brigade from 2011 to 2013, and went on to become Director of Information at Army Command in 2018.

Cole was appointed Companion of the Order of the Bath (CB) in the 2022 New Year Honours.
