= Evan =

Given name

- Pronunciation: Welsh: [ˈɛvan] English: /ˈɛvən/
- Gender: Male (primarily)
- Language: English, Welsh

Origin
- Meaning: Welsh form of John; "YHWH is gracious" (Ancient Hebrew)
- Region of origin: Celtic

Other names
- Related names: Eoin, Euan, Evandro, Evaristo, Ewan, Giannis, Giovanni, Hanan, Hans, Hone, Hovhannes, Ian, Ieuan, Ifan, Ioan, Ioane, Ioannis, Ivan, Iven, Jaan, Jack, Jackson, Jahan, Jan, Jane, Janet, Janez, János, Jean, Jens, Jhon, Joan, João, Johan/Johann, Johanan, Johannes, John, Johnny, Jon, Jone, Jonne, Jonni, Jovan, Juan, Juha, Juhani, Sean, Shane, Siân, Sinéad, Siobhan, Sion, Sioned, Xoán, Yahya, Yannis, Yo-han, Yohannes, Yunus

Evan is a Welsh and English masculine given name, derived from Iefan, a Welsh form of the name John. Evan can also occasionally be found as a shortened version of Greek names like Evangelos, Evander, or Evandro. While predominantly male, the name is occasionally given to women, as with the actress Evan Rachel Wood. It may also be encountered as a surname, although Evans is a far more common form within this context.

Other languages possess words and names ostensibly similar to Evan, such as Eòghann in Scottish Gaelic, Eógan in Irish, Owain in Welsh, and Owen in English. However, these names are altogether different etymologically, generally thought to come from the Greek and Latin word eugenēs, which means "noble" or "well-born".

== Popularity ==
The popularity of the name Evan in the United States rose steadily over the latter half of the 20th century, going from the 440th-ranked male name in 1957 to peaking at the 35th-ranked male name in 2009. It began to decline in 2010 and had dropped out of the top 100 by 2020. Among American males in 2021, the name had less than a third of the popularity it had had in 2010.

Evan's popularity as a male name 2000–2023
Year	Rank
2023	137
2022	133
2021	118
2020	102
2019	96
2018	86
2017	84
2016	69
2015	67
2014	58
2013	55
2012	47
2011	40
2010	36
2009	35
2008	38
2007	40
2006	42
2005	39
2004	39
2003	44
2002	56
2001	56
2000	55

== People ==
=== Given name ===
- Evan (born 2001), South Korean singer and former member of the group Enhypen
- Evan A. Baker (born 1952), American opera historian
- Evan A. Lottman (1931–2001), American film editor
- Evan Abraham (1901–1990), Welsh footballer
- Evan Adams (born 1966), Indigenous Canadian actor, playwright, and physician
- Evan Adermann (1927–2001), Australian politician
- Evin Agassi (1947–2024), Assyrian-American singer
- Evan Alex Cole (born 1985), American actor
- Evan Amos (born 1983), American video game photographer
- Evan Anderson (born 2002), American football player
- Evan Arapostathis (born 1963), American former NFL player
- Evan Armstrong (1943–2017), Scottish professional boxer
- Evan Arnold, American actor
- Evan Arnold (cricketer) (born 1974), Australian former cricketer and amateur footballer
- Evan Atar Adaha (born 1966/1967), South Sudanese surgeon
- Evan Austin (born 1992), American Paralympic swimmer
- Evan B. Goss (1872–1930), American judge
- Evan B. Stotsenburg (1865–1937), American politician and lawyer
- Evan Bacon (born 1997/1998), American LEGO-artist and software developer
- Evan Baillie (1741–1835), Scottish slave-trader, merchant, and landowner
- Evan Balfour (born 1965), Scottish footballer
- Evan Bartels, American singer-songwriter, musician, and writer
- Evan Bass (born 1982), American businessperson, erectile dysfunction specialist, and television personality
- Evan Bates (born 1989), American ice dancer
- Evan Battey (born 1998), American NBL player
- Evan Baxter, multiple people
- Evan Bayh (born 1955), American lawyer, lobbyist, and politician
- Evan Baylis (born 1993), American NFL player
- Evan Beard (born 1986), American entrepreneur and engineer
- Evan Beerntsen (born 2000), American football player
- Evan Beloff, Canadian film writer, producer, director, and production company executive
- Evan Berger (born 1987), Australian former footballer
- Evan Berger (politician) (born 1960), Canadian politician
- Evan Bernard, American commercial- and music video director
- Evan Bernstein (athlete) (born 1960), Israeli Olympic wrestler
- Evan Berry (born 1995), American NFL player
- Evan Bevan (1803–1866), Welsh writer
- Evan Bird (born 2000), Canadian actor
- Evan Blass (born 1978), American blogger, editor, and phone leaker
- Evan Boehm (born 1993), American NFL player
- Evan Bouchard (born 1999), Canadian NHL player
- Evan Bradds (born 1994), American NBA coach and former college player
- Evan Brandt, American reporter
- Evan Breeze (1798–1855), Welsh poet and schoolmaster
- Evan Brewer (born 1981), American musician
- Evan Brophey (born 1986), Canadian former NHL player
- Evan Brown (disambiguation), multiple people
- Evan Bruinsma (born 1992), American DBL player
- Evan Bryant (1839–1918), English Presbyterian missionary
- Evan Buliung, Canadian actor
- Evan-Burrows Fontaine (1898–1984), American interpretive dancer and actress
- Evan Bush (born 1986), American MLS player
- Evan C. Kim (born 1953), American actor
- Evan Call (born 1988), American composer and arranger
- Evan Carawan, American hammered dulcimer and mandolin player
- Evan Carey (born 1994), Canadian track cyclist
- Evan Carlson (born 1953), Canadian politician
- Evan Centopani (born 1981), American personal trainer, nutritionist, and retired professional bodybuilder
- Evan Chambers (born 1963), American composer and musician
- Evan Chandler, American screenwriter and dentist, known for accusing Michael Jackson of molesting his son
- Evan Charlton (1904–1984), British artist
- Evan Charney, American political scientist and associate professor
- Evan Charteris (1864–1940), English biographer, barrister, and arts administrator
- Evan Chesler (born 1949), American lawyer
- Evan Chevalier (born 1992), French footballer
- Evan Cheverie (born 1980), Canadian retired professional ice hockey forward
- Evan Christopher (born 1969), American jazz clarinetist and composer
- Evan Cody (born 1995), Irish hurler
- Evan Cohen, South African-born Israeli linguist and tenured professor
- Evan Cole (born 1961), American retail chief executive
- Evan Comerford (disambiguation), multiple people
- Evan Conti (born 1993), American-Israeli basketball player and coach
- Evan Conway (born 1997), American USL player
- Evan Cooper (disambiguation), multiple people
- Evan Copley (1930–2018), American academic and musician
- Evan Corcoran (born 1964), American federal prosecutor
- Evan Cotton (1868–1939), British politician, barrister, administrator, journalist, historian, and writer
- Evan Coyne Maloney (born 1972), American inactive documentary filmmaker
- Evan Craft (born 1991), American Contemporary worship music singer
- Evan Cranley, Canadian musician
- Evan Crawford, multiple people
- Evan Crenshaw (born 2004), American football player
- Evan Crooks, American actor
- Evan Currie (born 1976), Canadian fiction writer
- Evan D. Skillman (born 1955), American astronomer and astrophysicist
- Evan Dahm (born 1987), American webcartoonist
- Evan Dando (born 1967), American musician
- Evan Dara, American novelist
- Evan Daugherty (born 1981), American screenwriter, director, and editor
- Evan Davies (disambiguation), multiple people
- Evan DePaul (born 1996), Canadian retired sailor
- Evan Dimas (born 1995), Indonesian professional footballer
- Evan Dobelle (born 1945), American educator
- Evan Dollard (born 1982), American athlete and rock climber
- Evan Dorkin (born 1965), American comics artist and cartoonist
- Evan Douglis, American architect, scholar, and dean
- Evan Dunfee (born 1990), Canadian race walker and Olympian
- Evan Dunham (born 1981), American mixed martial artist
- Evan Dunsky, American television writer, producer, and director
- Evan Durbin (1906–1948), British economist and politician
- Evan Duthie (born 2000), Scottish DJ and music producer
- Evan Dybvig (born 1975), American Olympic freeskier
- Evan E. Eichler, American geneticist
- Evan E. Settle (1848–1899), American lawyer and politician
- Evan Edinger (born 1990), American YouTuber
- Evan Edwards (1898–1958), Welsh footballer
- Evan Elken (born 1977), American former cyclist
- Evan Engram (born 1994), American NFL player
- Evan Enwerem (1935–2007), Nigerian politician
- Evan Esar (1899–1995), American humorist
- Evan Eschmeyer (born 1975), American retired NBA player
- Evan Esselink (born 1992), Canadian long-distance runner
- Evan Eugene Fraser (1865–1949), Ontario contractor and political figure
- Evan Evagora, Australian actor
- Evan Evans (disambiguation), multiple people
- Evan Fallenberg (born 1961), American-born Israeli writer and translator
- Evan Farmer (born 1972), American business owner, television host, radio host, actor, musician, designer/customizer, and author
- Evan Felker (born 1984), American singer, songwriter, and guitarist
- Evan Ferguson (born 2004), Irish professional footballer
- Evan Finnegan (born 1995), Irish footballer
- Evan Flatow (born 1956), American orthopaedic surgeon-scientist and researcher
- Evan Forde (born 1952), American oceanographer
- Evan Fong (born 1992), Canadian internet personality, video game commentator, music producer, DJ, and YouTuber
- Evan Foulkes (c. 1751–1825), British politician
- Evan Fournier (born 1992), French NBA player
- Evan Frankfort (born 1970), American television music producer
- Evan Fraser (disambiguation), multiple people
- Evan Frasure (born 1951), American politician
- Evan Freed (born 1946), American attorney and photographer
- Evan Furness (born 1998), French professional tennis player
- Evan G. Galbraith (1928–2008), American Ambassador to France under President Ronald Reagan
- Evan G. Greenberg (born 1955), American business executive
- Evan Gattis (born 1986), American former MLB player
- Evan Geiselman (born 1993), American surfer
- Evan Giia, American soprano and pop singer
- Evan Gill (born 1992), Canadian CFL player
- Evan Giltaire (born 2006), French racing driver
- Evan Glodell, American feature film director, producer, writer, and actor
- Evan Goldberg (born 1982), Canadian-American screenwriter, film producer, director, and comedian
- Evan Golden (disambiguation), multiple people
- Evan Gordon (cricketer) (born 1960), South African cricketer
- Evan Gorga (1865–1957), Italian lyric tenor
- Evan Goyke (born 1982), American attorney, politician, and academic
- Evan Gray (born 1954), New Zealand former cricketer
- Evan Greebel, American convicted felon and former attorney
- Evan Green (disambiguation), multiple people
- Evan Greer (born 1985), American activist, writer, and musician
- Evan Griffiths (1795–1873), Welsh clergyman
- Evan Gruzis (born 1979), American contemporary artist
- Evan Gulbis (born 1986), Australian cricketer
- Evan Gumbs (born 1997), English professional footballer
- Evan H. Caminker (born 1961), American lawyer and dean
- Evan Hammond (born 1980), Canadian radio show host, hockey broadcaster, and blogger
- Evan Handler (born 1961), American novelist and actor
- Evan Hansen (politician) (born 1966), American politician
- Evan Harding (born 1984), American USL player
- Evan Hardy (1927–1994), English rugby union cricketer
- Evan Harris (born 1965), British politician
- Evan Harris Humphrey (1875–1963), American army brigadier general
- Evan Hause (born 1967), American composer, percussionist, and conductor
- Evan Hayward (1876–1958), English politician
- Evan Helmuth (1977–2017), American film and television actor
- Evan Hewitt (born 1978), Australian former AFL player
- Evan Hill (1919–2010), American journalist and professor
- Evan Hirschelman, American classical guitarist and composer
- Evan Hlavacek (born 1974), American former football player
- Evan Hodgson (born 1998), English rugby league footballer
- Evan Holloway (born 1967), American artist
- Evan Holyfield (born 1997), American professional boxer
- Evan Hooker (1901–1962), English footballer
- Evan Horwood (born 1986), English former professional footballer
- Evan Howell (1839–1905), American politician, early telegraph operator, and soldier
- Evan Hoyt (born 1995), Mexican-born British tennis player
- Evan Huffman (born 1990), American former professional cyclist
- Evan Hughes, American operatic bass-baritone
- Evan Hull (born 2000), American football player
- Evan Hultman (1925–2025), American politician and attorney
- Evan Hunter (1926–2005), American author and screenwriter
- Evan Hunziker (1970–1996), American civilian whom North Korea imprisoned
- Evan Ira Farber (1922–2009), American librarian and college faculty
- Evan J. Crane (1889–1966), American chemist
- Evan J. Peterson, American author, poet, and educator
- Evan Jackson Leong, Chinese-American film director and documentary filmmaker
- Evan Jacobs (born 1968), American visual effects and 3D stereoscopic supervisor
- Evan Jacobs (musician), American past member of folk rock band Midlake
- Evan Jager (born 1989), American distance runner
- Evan James (disambiguation), multiple people
- Evan Jenkins (disambiguation), multiple people
- Evan Jenne (born 1977), American politician
- Evan John Price (1840–1899), Canadian lumber merchant and politician
- Evan Johns (1956–2017), American guitarist
- Evan Johnson (disambiguation), multiple people
- Evan Jolitz (born 1951), American former NFL player
- Evan Jones (disambiguation), multiple people
- Evan Jonigkeit (born 1983), American actor
- Evan K (born 1994), Greek/German composer and guitarist
- Evan Karagias (born 1973), American professional wrestler and actor
- Evan Karakolis (born 1994), Canadian javelin thrower
- Evan Katz, American television writer- and producer
- Evan Kaufmann (born 1984), German-American NHL player
- Evan Kemp (1937–1997), American disability rights activist
- Evan Khouri (born 2003), English footballer
- Evan King (born 1992), American professional tennis player
- Evan Kirk (born 1987), Canadian NLL player
- Evan Klamer (1923–1978), Danish cyclist
- Evan Kohlmann (born 1979), American terrorism consultant- and analyst, senior investigator, and expert witness
- Evan Kostopoulos (born 1990), Australian footballer of Greek descent
- Evan Kravetz (born 1996), American Major League Baseball pitcher
- Evan Kruczynski (born 1995), American professional baseball pitcher
- Evan Kuhlman, American writer of children's fiction novels
- Evan L. Schwab (born 1938), American attorney
- Evan Landi (born 1990), American NFL player
- Evan Lavender-Smith (born 1977), American writer, editor, and professor
- Evan Lee (disambiguation), multiple people
- Evan Leigh (1810–1876), English author, inventor, engineer, and manufacturer
- Evan Lewis (disambiguation), multiple people
- Evan Lilly (born 1989), Canadian curler
- Evan Lindquist (born 1936), American artist and printmaker
- Evan Link (born 2004), American football player
- Evan Llewellyn (disambiguation), multiple people
- Evan Lloyd (disambiguation), multiple people
- Evan Longoria (born 1985), American MLB player
- Evan Louro (born 1996), American MLS player
- Evan Low (born 1983), American politician
- Evan Lowenstein (born 1974), American member of musical duo Evan and Jaron
- Evan Luard (1926–1991), English politician
- Evan Lurie (born 1954), American composer and musician
- Evan Lurie (born 1966), American actor and martial artist
- Evan Lyon (born 1971), American medical professor
- Evan Lyons, Irish Gaelic footballer
- Evan Lysacek (born 1985), American retired figure skater
- Evan M. Johnson (1861–1923), American army officer
- Evan M. Whidden (1898–1980), Canadian Christian minister and academic
- Evan M. Woodward (1838–1904), American Civil War Union Army officer
- Evan Ma (born 1992), Canadian actor, singer, and rapper
- Evan MacColl (1808–1898), Scottish-born Canadian poet, writer, and songwriter
- Evan MacCormick (1882–1918), New Zealand cricketer
- Evan MacDonald (born 1981), German-born Canadian wrestler
- Evan MacGregor (1842–1926), British civil servant
- Evan Mack (born 1981), American composer, librettist, and pianist
- Evan Mackie (1917–1986), New Zealand fighter pilot and flying ace
- Evan MacLane (born 1982), American MLB pitcher
- Evan Maguire (born 1942), New Zealand long-distance runner
- Evan Malbone Johnson (1791–1865), American Episcopal priest and clergy
- Evan Mandery (born 1967), American author and criminal justice academic
- Evan Marginson (1909–1977), Australian politician
- Evan Marshall (disambiguation), multiple people
- Evan Marzilli (born 1991), American former MLB player
- Evan Mather (born 1970), American landscape architect, urban designer, and filmmaker
- Evan Mathis (born 1981), American former NFL player
- Evan Mawarire (born 1977), Zimbabwean pastor and activist
- Evan Mawdsley (born 1945), British historian and former history professor
- Evan Maxwell, American journalist, novelist, and non-fiction writer
- Evan McCollough (born 1987), Canadian former CFL player
- Evan McEachran (born 1997), Canadian freeskier
- Evan McEneny (born 1994), Canadian AHL player
- Evan McGrath (born 1986), Canadian former AHL player
- Evan McKie (born 1983), Canadian ballet dancer, choreographer, and writer
- Evan McMillan (born 1986), Irish football coach and former player
- Evan McMullin (born 1976), American politician and former CIA officer
- Evan McPherson (born 1999), American NFL player
- Evan Mecham (1924–2008), American businessman and politician
- Evan Medell (born 1997), American Para Taekwondo practitioner
- Evan Meek (born 1983), American MLB player
- Evan Mercer, Canadian actor
- Evan Milward (born 1984), Canadian former CSL player
- Evan Mobley (born 2001), American NBA player
- Evan Mock (born 1997), American model, actor, and skateboarder
- Evan Montvel Cohen (born 1966), American businessman
- Evan Moore (born 1985), American former NFL player and current TV football analyst
- Evan Moorhead (born 1978), Australian political strategist and former politician
- Evan Morgan (disambiguation), multiple people
- Evan Morris (lobbyist) (1977–2015), American lobbyist
- Evan "Mose" Hyde, Belizean television executive and talk show host
- Evan Mosey (born 1989), British-American EIHL player
- Evan Mulholland, Australian politician
- Evan Murphy (born 1988), American professional racing cyclist
- Evan Murray-Macgregor (1785–1841), Scottish colonial administrator and senior British army officer
- Evan Nagao (born 1996), American musician and competitive yo-yo player
- Evan Narcisse, American comic book writer, journalist, and video game narrative designer
- Evan Ndicka (born 1999), French professional footballer
- Evan Neal (born 2000), American NFL player
- Evan Nepean (1752–1822), British politician and colonial administrator
- Evan Nepean (cricketer) (1865–1906), English barrister and cricketer
- Evan Neufeldt (born 1987), Canadian skeleton racer
- Evan Neumann (born 1972), American software developer and US fugitive
- Evan Newton (born 1988), American USL player
- Evan Nichols (born 2004), American Paralympic ice sled hockey player
- Evan Niland (born 1998), Irish hurler
- Evan Noel (1879–1928), English rackets player
- Evan Oakley, American poet
- Evan Oberg (born 1988), Canadian retired NHL player
- Evan O'Dorney (born 1993), American mathematician
- Evan Oglesby (born 1981), American former NFL player
- Evan Oliphant (born 1982), Scottish bicycle racer
- Evan Olmstead (born 1991), Canadian rugby union player
- Evan Olson (born 1967), American rock singer and songwriter
- Evan O’Hanlon (born 1988), Australian Paralympic athlete
- Evan O'Neill Kane (1861–1932), American physician and surgeon
- Evan O'Neill Kane (physicist) (1924–2006), American physicist
- Evan Osnos (born 1976), American journalist and author
- Evan Owen Allen (1805–1852), Welsh writer and poet
- Evan Parke (born 1968), Jamaican-born American actor
- Evan Parker (born 1944), British tenor and soprano saxophone player
- Evan Parry (1865–1938), Welsh-born New Zealand electrical engineer
- Evan Patak (born 1984), American volleyball player
- Evan Pateshall (1817–1885), British politician
- Evan Penny (born 1953), South African-born Canadian sculptor
- Evan Peter Aurand (1917–1989), American naval officer
- Evan Peters (born 1987), American actor
- Evan Pettersson, Swedish retired footballer
- Evan Phillips (born 1994), American MLB pitcher
- Evan Pilgrim (born 1972), American former NFL player
- Evan Porter (born 1987), American baseball coach and former player
- Evan Press (born 2000), Welsh footballer
- Evan Price, Welsh politician and barrister
- Evan Prodromou (born 1968), American software developer and open source advocate
- Evan Pryor (born 2002), American football player
- Evan Pugh (1828–1864), American academic administrator and agricultural chemist
- Evan Puschak (born 1988), American video essayist, journalist, and YouTuber
- Evan R. Bernstein (born 1974), American nonprofit executive
- Evan Rachel Wood (born 1987), American actress, singer, and activist
- Evan Rankin (born 1986), American ECHL player
- Evan Ratliff (born c. 1975), American journalist and author
- Evan Ravenel (born 1989), American professional basketball player
- Evan Reed (born 1985), American former MLB pitcher
- Evan Rees (disambiguation), multiple people
- Evan Reilly, American television writer, producer, and director
- Evan Richards (1862–1931), Welsh international rugby union player
- Evan Roberts (disambiguation), multiple people
- Evan Roderick (born 1995), Canadian actor
- Evan Rodrigues (born 1993), Canadian NHL player
- Evan Rodriguez (born 1988), American former NFL player
- Evan Roe (born 2000), American actor
- Evan Rogers, American songwriter and record producer
- Evan Rogers (priest) (1914–1982), British archdeacon
- Evan Roos (born 2000), South African rugby union player
- Evan Rosen, American author, speaker, business strategist, blogger, and journalist
- Evan Rosenfeld (born 1981), American film and television producer
- Evan Ross (born 1988), American actor and musician
- Evan Roth (born 1978), American artist
- Evan Rotundo (born 2004), American soccer player
- Evan Royster (born 1987), American former NFL player
- Evan Rutckyj (born 1992), Canadian MLB pitcher
- Evan Ryan (born 1971), American public servant and White House Cabinet Secretary
- Evan S. Connell (1924–2013), American writer
- Evan S. Tyler (1843–1923), American politician and American Civil War Union Army soldier
- Evan Sanders (born 1981), Indonesian actor and pop singer
- Evan Sayet (born 1960), American Jewish comedian, speaker, and conservative humorist
- Evan Schwartz (disambiguation), multiple people
- Evan Scribner (born 1985), American MLB pitcher
- Evan Seinfeld, American musician, actor, director, photographer, writer, and former pornographic actor
- Evan Seys (1604–1685), Welsh politician
- Evan Shanks (born 1964), American rock bassist
- Evan Shanley (born 1986), American attorney and politician
- Evan Sharp (born 1982), American billionaire Internet entrepreneur
- Evan Shefflin (born 1999), Irish hurler
- Evan Shelby (1720–1794), Welsh-American trapper and militia officer
- Evan Shelby Alexander (c. 1767–1809), American politician
- Evan Shinners (born 1986), American pianist, clavichordist, and electronic music composer
- Evan Shute (1905–1978), Canadian obstetrician, poet, and writer
- Evan Siddall (born 1965), Canadian chief executive
- Evan Siegel (born 1954), American mathematics and computer science professor
- Evan Siemann, American bioscience professor
- Evan Simon, American football player
- Evan Simpson (born 1957), American politician
- Evan Singleton (born 1992), American strongman competitor and former profession wrestler
- Evan Skolnick (born 1966), American writer, editor, and producer
- Evan Skoug (born 1995), American MLB catcher
- Evan Smith (disambiguation), multiple people
- Evan Smotrycz (born 1991), American basketball player
- Evan Solomon (born 1968), Canadian columnist, political journalist, radio host, and publisher
- Evan Soumilena (born 1996), Indonesian professional futsal player
- Evan Spencer (born 1993), American former NFL player
- Evan Spicer (1849–1937), British politician
- Evan Spiegel (born 1990), American founder of Snapchat
- Evan Spiliotopoulos (born c. 1973), Greek-American screenwriter, film producer, and film director
- Evan Stamer (born 2001), American racing driver
- Evan Stephens (1854–1930), Welsh-born American Mormon composer and hymn writer
- Evan Stewart (disambiguation), multiple people
- Evan Stoflet (born 1984), American ECHL player
- Evan Stone (born 1964), American pornographic film actor and director
- Evan Strong (born 1986), American Para-snowboard cross racer
- Evan Susser (born 1985), American comedy writer and television producer
- Evan Svoboda, American football player
- Evan Tanner (1971–2008), American mixed martial artist
- Evan Taubenfeld (born 1983), American singer and musician
- Evan Taylor (footballer) (born 1989), Jamaican footballer
- Evan Tengesdahl (born 2005), American college football guard
- Evan Thapa (born 2003), Indian professional footballer
- Evan Thomas (disambiguation), multiple people
- Evan Thompson (born 1962), Canadian writer and philosophy professor
- Evan Thornley (born 1964), Australian entrepreneur
- Evan Todd (born 1989), American actor and producer
- Evan Tracey, American communications executive, media analyst, and chief operating officer
- Evan Trupp (born 1987), American ECHL player
- Evan Turner (born 1988), American NBA coach and former player
- Evan van Moerkerke (born 1993), Canadian competitive swimmer
- Evan Vickers (born 1954), American politician
- Evan Vogds (1923–1994), American NFL player
- Evan Vucci (born 1977), American photographer
- Evan W. Scott (1876–1955), American naval officer
- Evan Waldrep (born 1997), American professional soccer player
- Evan Walker (disambiguation), multiple people
- Evan Wallace (1982–2017), American rapper
- Evan Wallach (born 1949), American lawyer and judge
- Evan Walters (1892–1951), Welsh artist
- Evan Washburn (born 1984), American sports reporter
- Evan Watkin (born 1951), New Zealand cricket umpire
- Evan Watkins (1882–1956), Welsh rugby footballer
- Evan Weaver (born 1998), American NFL player
- Evan Weinger (born 1997), American AHL player
- Evan Weinstock (born 1991), American Olympic bobsledder
- Evan Wells, American video game designer and programmer
- Evan Wensley (born 1998), Malaysian professional footballer
- Evan Whildin, American firearm designer
- Evan White (born 1996), American professional baseball player
- Evan Whitfield (born 1977), American retired MLS player
- Evan Whitton (1928–2018), Australian journalist
- Evan Wick (born 1997), American wrestler
- Evan Wickham (born 1981), American Christian musician and pastor
- Evan Wilkerson, American Paralympic swimmer
- Evan Williams (disambiguation), multiple people
- Evan Winter, Canadian fantasy writer
- Evan Wisdom (1869–1945), Australian politician, businessman, and army officer
- Evan Wolfson (born 1957), American attorney and gay rights advocate
- Evan Woolley, Alberta politician
- Evan Worrell (born 1979), American politician
- Evan Worthington (born 1995), American football player
- Evan Wright (born 1965/1966), American writer
- Evan Wynn (born 1962), American former legislator
- Evan X Hyde (born 1947), Belizean writer, journalist, media executive, and former politician
- Evan Yang (1920–1978), Chinese film director, screenwriter, actor, and songwriter
- Evan Yardley (born 1993), Welsh rugby union player
- Evan Yo (born 1986), Taiwanese pop singer-songwriter
- Evan Young (born 1976), American attorney and judge
- Evan Zhu (born 1998), American tennis player
- Evan Zimmermann, American businessman, investor, and philanthropist
- Evan Ziporyn (born 1959), American composer and musician

==== Fictional characters ====
- Evan Barnett, businessman in the film Little Rascals
- Evan Baxter, in the 2007 film Evan Almighty
- Evan "Buck" Buckley, a character in the TV series 9-1-1
- Evan Chambers, in the 2007 TV series Greek
- Evan Delaney, female writer and legal assistant in five novels by Meg Gardiner
- Evan Drake, a character in the TV sitcom Cheers
- Evan Hansen, the title character in the Broadway musical Dear Evan Hansen and its 2021 film adaptation.
- Evan Hawkins, Paramedic Field Chief on Chicago Fire
- Evan Lewis, a character from Final Destination 2
- Evan Lorne, a character in the 2004 Canadian–American Sci-Fi Channel television series Stargate SG-1 and Stargate Atlantis, played by Kavan Smith
- Evan Michael Tanner, government agent with permanent insomnia in eight novels by Lawrence Block
- Evan Treborn, in the 2004 film The Butterfly Effect
- Evan Rosier, deceased Death Eater in the Harry Potter series
- Evan Russell, main character in the 2014 film Spring
- Evan Webber, main character in the 2005 film Knock Knock

=== Surname ===
- Rev. Cadwallader William Evan (?–1876), first minister of Stow Church, Adelaide, South Australia
  - Mostyn Evan (1861–1924), Cadwallader William Evan's son. A South Australian lawyer and sports administrator
- Gerard Evan (born 1955), British biologist
- Gio Evan (born 1988; as Giovanni Giancaspro), Italian artist
- Jared Evan (born 1989; as Jared Evan Siegel), American singer-songwriter
- Rob Evan, American actor and singer

== Popular culture references to the name Evan ==
- Evan Almighty, a 2007 film and standalone sequel to the 2003 film Bruce Almighty.
- Dear Evan Hansen, an award-winning 2016 Broadway musical and its film adaptation.

== See also ==
- Euan
- Inan
