= Brian O'Sullivan =

Brian or Bryan O'Sullivan may refer to:

- Brian O'Sullivan (Waterford hurler) (born 1990), Irish hurler for Waterford and for Ballygunner
- Brian O'Sullivan (Cork hurler) (born 2002), Irish hurler for Cork and for Kanturk
- Bryan O'Sullivan (born 1988), Limerick hurler
- Brian O'Sullivan (Gaelic footballer), see Noel O'Leary
- Brian O'Sullivan (swimmer), participated in Swimming at the 2011 European Youth Summer Olympic Festival
- Bryan O'Sullivan, technical writer, programmer; leading author of the Real World Haskell book

== See also ==
- Brian Sullivan (disambiguation)
