= Ryan Sullivan (disambiguation) =

Ryan Sullivan is a speedway rider.

Ryan Sullivan may refer to:

- Ryan Sullivan (cyclist) (born 1984), Australian racing cyclist
- Ryan Sullivan (golfer) (born 1989), American golfer
- Ryan Sullivan (artist) (born 1983), American abstract painter

== See also ==
- Brian Sullivan (disambiguation)
