= Evan Thomas (disambiguation) =

Evan Thomas (born 1951) is an American journalist and author.

Evan Thomas or variant, may also refer to:

== People ==
=== Given name ===
- Evan Thomas (actor) (1891–1982), Canadian-born British actor
- Evan Thomas (priest) (1872–1953), Welsh clergyman and professor
- Evan Thomas (rugby league), Welsh rugby league player
- Evan Thomas (inventor), Welsh ironmonger, inventor and manufacturer of safety lamps for miners
- Evan Thomas (mariner), Welsh mariner
- Evan Kyffin Thomas (1877–1935), editor and newspaper proprietor in South Australia
- Evan Thomas, Ceredigion sea captain who co-founded Evan Thomas, Radcliffe and Company, Wales-based shipping company

=== Surname ===
- Charles Evan-Thomas (1897–1958), British-Welsh cricketer
- Hugh Evan-Thomas (1862–1928), British admiral

== Other uses ==
- Mount Evan-Thomas, a mountain in Alberta, Canada

== See also ==
- Evan Thomas Davies (disambiguation)
- John Evan Thomas (1810–1873), Welsh sculptor
- Leland Evan Thomas (1918–1942), United States Marine Corps pilot
  - USS Leland E. Thomas
