= Kevan Smith =

Kevan Smith may refer to:

- Kevan Smith (footballer) (born 1959), English former footballer
- Kevan Smith (baseball) (born 1988), American professional baseball catcher

== See also ==
- Evan Smith (disambiguation)
- Kavan Smith (born 1970), Canadian actor
- Kevin Smith (disambiguation)
