= St. John's Episcopal Church (Park Slope) =

Episcopal church in Park Slope, Brooklyn, New York

- St. John's Park Slope
- The church and rectory in 1906
- St. John's Episcopal Church
- 40.6769°N 73.9746°W
- Location: 139 St. John's Place, Park Slope, Brooklyn, New York City
- Country: United States
- Denomination: Episcopal Church
- Website: www.parkslopechurch.org

History
- Status: Parish church
- Founded: September 24, 1826
- Founder: Evan Malbone Johnson
- Consecrated: July 10, 1827 (first church); December 27, 1931 (present church)

Architecture
- Architect: Edward Tuckerman Potter (attributed)
- Style: Gothic Revival
- Years built: 1869–1870; enlarged from 1885

Specifications
- Materials: Brownstone

Administration
- Diocese: Long Island

Clergy
- Rector: The Rev. Ben DeHart

St. John's Episcopal Church, known locally as St. John's Park Slope, is a parish of the Episcopal Church at 139 St. John's Place in the Park Slope neighborhood of Brooklyn, New York City. Founded in 1826 in what was then the village of Brooklyn, it is the second-oldest Episcopal parish in Brooklyn, after St. Ann's. Since 1870 the congregation has worshipped in a Gothic Revival brownstone church, attributed to the architect Edward Tuckerman Potter, which lies within the Park Slope Historic District, designated by the New York City Landmarks Preservation Commission in 1973. The parish belongs to the Episcopal Diocese of Long Island.

== History ==
=== Founding ===
In 1826 the Rev. Evan Malbone Johnson sold his farm in Newtown to pay for a new church in Brooklyn. The first St. John's, a wooden building at Washington and Johnson Streets, opened for worship on September 24, 1826. The parish was incorporated on April 16, 1827, as "The Rector, Church Wardens and Vestrymen of Saint John's Church at Brooklyn", and the church was consecrated by Bishop John Henry Hobart on July 10, 1827. Its name was chosen by drawing lots. Johnson served as rector for twenty-one years without salary; known locally as "the Domine", he was said to have married some two thousand couples.

The young parish was active in the life of the village. In the 1820s it joined Presbyterian, Baptist and Dutch Reformed congregations in founding the Brooklyn Sunday School Union. By about 1837 its Sunday school kept a lending library of some 400 volumes open to the public, and in 1831 Johnson's wife, Maria, founded the Women's Benevolent Society, whose 1841 silver collection plates the parish still owns. Johnson also led the petition to open Myrtle Avenue, which succeeded despite some four hundred objectors.

In 1843, when pew rents were keeping poorer people out, Johnson asked the vestry that no one who came to the church "shall ever apply ... and not be supplied with a seat", and the vestry agreed. The same year, in a private letter to John Jay, he wrote that, whatever his earlier opinions, he had come to believe that "God hath made of one blood" the whole human race. He befriended the Black priest Alexander Crummell, inviting him to preach, and between 1846 and 1853 he was among the clergy who argued that St. Philip's Church, a Black congregation in Manhattan, should be admitted to the convention of the Diocese of New York; St. Philip's vestry formally thanked him. He resigned from St. John's in 1847 to found St. Michael's, a free church in Brooklyn.

=== Dissension and recovery ===
After the death of the rector Thomas T. Guion in 1862, the parish was divided: vestrymen resigned, meetings failed to reach a quorum, and several priests declined calls to serve as rector. Bishop Horatio Potter asked George Franklin Seymour to recover the parish from "the distressing condition into which internal dissension had brought it". Seymour raised more than $13,000 in a single year, served until 1866, and later became Bishop of Springfield.

=== Move to Park Slope ===
In 1868 the parish sold its building and began holding mission services near Prospect Park. Under the rector Alexander Burgess, later Bishop of Quincy, it bought lots at Seventh Avenue and Douglass Street (now St. John's Place) in 1869, and the cornerstone of a new chapel was laid on June 15, 1869. The chapel opened on January 16, 1870, with about six hundred people present and Bishop Abram Newkirk Littlejohn preaching. The parish's histories attribute its design to Edward Tuckerman Potter, who had earlier been engaged to design a church the parish planned, and never built, on DeKalb Avenue. A larger church planned for the Seventh Avenue corner was never built, and the corner lots were later sold. The Brooklyn Theatre was built on the site of the first church and burned on December 5, 1876, in one of the deadliest fires in the city's history; the site was later occupied by the Brooklyn Daily Eagle building.

In 1885 the parish began enlarging the chapel with a nave and chancel, giving the building a cruciform plan. Trinity Church, Wall Street, which had helped the parish in 1832, lent it $8,000 in 1872 and forgave the loan in 1910. The parish carried a mortgage for forty-six years. During the Great Depression the rector's salary was small and sometimes paid in food, but the mortgage was paid off in 1931 and the church was consecrated by Bishop Ernest M. Stires on December 27 of that year.

=== Twentieth century ===
From the 1950s, Anglicans who had immigrated from the Caribbean became a large part of the congregation and sustained it as many earlier members moved away. The parish's own history acknowledges that the newcomers "were not always welcomed" at first. On December 16, 1960, the 1960 New York mid-air collision brought one of the airliners down at Seventh Avenue and Sterling Place, a block from the church. A new Hillgreen-Lane organ, the gift of an anonymous donor, was dedicated in 1962, and in 1963 a bequest of more than $400,000 from Mrs. Palen Nelson established the parish endowment. A series of sacrament windows by Payne Studios was installed between 1965 and 1971.

Around 1970 St. John's joined St. Augustine's Church and the Richmond Foundation in sponsoring the Park Slope North Child Development Center, the first day-care center built from the ground up in New York City under the 1969 Youth Facilities Act; it served about 250 children and was later named for Helen Carey, wife of Governor Hugh Carey. Brian McAnuff, a composer published by Oxford University Press, was music director from about 1971 to 2009. The parish celebrated its sesquicentennial in 1976 with a history by its rector, the Rev. Clifford A. Buck, who served from 1958 until his death in 1985.

Under the Rev. Clarence H. Powers (1987–2013), the parish helped found the Brooklyn Episcopal AIDS Committee in 1989, the first such committee in the diocese, and in the late 1980s buried in its garden people with AIDS, some of whom had been abandoned by their families. It ran a weekly food ministry and Thanksgiving dinners for homeless and elderly neighbors, and launched a parish website in 1996. In 1992 it bought a fire-damaged brownstone on Seventh Avenue for classrooms and youth programs; the purchase divided the congregation, but the building served for a decade and was sold in 2003 for nearly three times its cost, paying for a new boiler, a kitchen and the restoration of the garden. A room for young children added about 2008 was followed in June 2009 by ten baptisms on a single day. Several parishioners from this period were later ordained. A 2010 tornado damaged the bell-cote and garden; insurance funded the church's first full repainting in decades, and the restoration was completed in 2012, the year Powers published a second parish history.

=== Twenty-first century ===
The Rev. Shelley McDade came to St. John's as priest-in-charge in 2015 and later became rector, serving until 2020, when she was called to All Saints' Church in Rehoboth Beach, Delaware. The Rev. Ben DeHart became rector in 2023; in 2024 The Living Church reported on the parish's renewed growth. The parish marked its bicentennial on May 17, 2026, which the New York State Senate recognized in a resolution sponsored by Senator Zellnor Myrie noting its "strong Caribbean legacy".

== Architecture ==
The church is built of brownstone in the Gothic Revival style; the Landmarks Preservation Commission's records date it to 1869. The cornerstone, laid in 1869, is inscribed "JESUS ✝ CHRIST". The original chapel was enlarged from 1885 with a nave and chancel. A memorial window to Guion depicts St. John, and the Holy Family windows in the nave memorialize the Nelson family. A shrine to Our Lady was dedicated in September 1971 by the exiled Bishop of Haiti. A Jardine tracker organ installed in 1893 was replaced by the Hillgreen-Lane organ in 1962.

== Clergy ==
#	Name	Years	Notes
1	Evan Malbone Johnson	1826–1847	Founder; served without salary
2	Samuel Roosevelt Johnson	1847–1850	
3	N. A. Okeson	1851–1852	
4	Thomas T. Guion	1853–1862	Died in office
5	George Franklin Seymour	1863–1866	Later Bishop of Springfield
6	Alexander Burgess	1867–1869	Led the move to Park Slope; later Bishop of Quincy
7	Robert E. Terry	1870–1874	First rector in the present building
8	Thomas S. Pycott	1874–1887	
9	George F. Breed	1887–1903	
10	Frank D. Page	1903–1911	
11	Thomas Bond Holland	1911–1930	
12	Gordon D. Pierce	1931–1950	
13	Howard G. Clark	1950–1955	
14	Donald James Gardner	1955–1958	
15	Clifford Allen Buck	1958–1985	Died in office
16	Clarence H. Powers	1987–2013	
17	Shelley McDade	2015–2020	Priest-in-charge from 2015, then rector
18	Ben DeHart	2023–present	

Interim priests served between Buck and Powers, between Powers and McDade, and between McDade and DeHart.

== See also ==
- Park Slope Historic District
- Episcopal Diocese of Long Island
- St. Ann & the Holy Trinity Church
