= Isaac Jones (priest) =

Welsh cleric and translator (1804-1850)

Isaac Jones (1804–1850) was a Welsh cleric and translator.

== Life ==
Jones was born 2 May 1804 in the parish of Llanychaiarn, near Aberystwyth, Cardiganshire. His father taught him Latin and he also attended school in the village. He then went to Aberystwyth grammar school, where he became first an assistant, and in 1828 head-master. He resigned the post in 1834, when he entered St David's College, Lampeter, and was elected Eldon Hebrew scholar there in 1835.

Ordained deacon in September 1836, Jones was made a priest in September 1837. His first curacy was Llanfihangel Genau'r Glyn, and he then moved to Bangor Chapel, both in the Aberystwyth area. In February 1840 he became curate of Llanedwen and Llanddaniel Fab in Anglesey, where he remained till his death, 2 December 1850. He was buried in Llanidan churchyard.

== Works ==
Jones is mainly known as a translator of English works into Welsh. The following are some of his translations:

- William Gurney's Diamond Pocket Dictionary of the Holy Bible, with additions, completed in 1835 in 2 vols.
- Adam Clarke's Commentary on the New Testament, 2 vols., 1847. Jones's companion translation of the commentary on the Old Testament was interrupted by his last illness.
- John Williams's A Narrative of Missionary Enterprises in the South Sea Islands; half only published, since another Welsh edition was issued at the same time.

Jones was joint-editor with Owen Williams of Waunfawr of a Welsh encyclopædia, Y Geirlyfr Cymraeg, 2 vols., Llanfair-Caereinion, 1835; the second volume was written by Jones. He edited also the second edition of William Salesbury's Welsh Testament, originally published in 1567 (Carnarvon, 1850), and assisted Evan Griffiths of Swansea in bringing out a translation of Matthew Henry's Exposition.

== Notes ==
Attribution

This article incorporates text from a publication now in the public domain: Lee, Sidney, ed. (1892). "Jones, Isaac". Dictionary of National Biography. Vol. 30. London: Smith, Elder & Co.
