= Oulton =

Oulton may refer to:

== Places ==
- Oulton, Cumbria, England
- Oulton, Norfolk, England
- Oulton, Norbury, in Norbury, Staffordshire, England
- Oulton, Stone Rural, Staffordshire, England
- Oulton, Suffolk, England
- Oulton, West Yorkshire, England
- Oulton Dyke, Suffolk, England

== Persons ==
- Brian Oulton (1908–1992), English character actor
- Derek Oulton (1927–2016), British senior civil servant
- Michael Oulton (born 1959), Anglican Bishop of Ontario
- Thérèse Oulton (born 1953), English painter
- Walley Chamberlain Oulton (1770?–1820?), Irish playwright and theatre historian
- Wilfrid Oulton (1911-1997), RAF officer

== See also ==
- Oulton Broad North railway station, Suffolk
- Oulton Broad South railway station, Suffolk
- Oulton College, Canadian private post secondary college situated in Moncton, New Brunswick
- Oulton Estate, former house and grounds in Cheshire, containing
  - Oulton Park, motor racing circuit
- Oulton Hall, West Yorkshire
- Oulton Park, motor racing track in Little Budworth, Cheshire
- Oulton Raiders, amateur rugby league football club from Oulton in Leeds, West Yorkshire
- Oulton Raidettes, English women's Rugby League club
- RAF Oulton, Norfolk
- Timothy Oulton, British furniture brand named after its founder and creative director Timothy Oulton
