= Jittery =

Jittery may refer to:

- Jittery Jester is the 88th animated cartoon short subject in the Woody Woodpecker series
- Jittery Joe's is a chain of coffee houses based in Athens, Georgia
- Live at Jittery Joe's was an album released in 2001 by Jeff Mangum of Neutral Milk Hotel to battle the high prices of bootlegs on eBay
- Jittery Joe's (cycling team) (UCI Code: JIT) is a UCI Continental team consisting of professional and amateur riders that compete primarily in USA Cycling Professional Tour and UCI America Tour road bicycle racing events
