= Evan Evans =

Evan Evans may refer to:

- Evan Alfred Evans (1876–1948), US judge
- Evan Evans (racing driver) (born 1965), American off-road champion racing in Championship Off-Road Racing
- Evan Evans (academic) (1813–1891), Master of Pembroke College, Oxford and Vice-Chancellor of the University of Oxford
- Evan Evans (poet) (1731–1789), Welsh poet and antiquary
- Evan Evans (Pennsylvania politician) (1749–1823), American politician from Pennsylvania
- Evan Evans (Ieuan Glan Geirionydd) (1795–1855), Welsh poet, hymnwriter and clergyman
- Evan Evans (minister) (1804–1886), Welsh dissenting minister
- Evan Evans (film composer) (born 1975), American film score composer
- Evan Herber Evans (1836–1896), Welsh Nonconformist minister
- Evan W. Evans (1841–1917), American farmer-stockman and state assemblyman in Wisconsin
- Evan William Evans (1827–1874), Welsh-American mathematician
- Evan Evans, a pseudonym of Frederick Schiller Faust (1892–1944), an American author known as Max Brand
- Evan Evans, coach tour operator based in London, absorbed by Wallace Arnold in 1969
- Evan Vincent Evans (1851–1934), journalist and promoter of the Welsh national revival
- Evan Evans (footballer) (1903–1982), Welsh football wing half

== See also ==
- Evans Evans (1932–2024), American actress
