= Evan Lee =

Evan Lee may refer to:

- Evan Lee (baseball) (born 1997), American baseball player
- Evan Lee (soccer) (born 1993), American soccer player
- Evan Lee (artist) (born 1975), Canadian artist
- Evan Lee, known as EvanTubeHD (born 2005), American YouTuber
- EVAN, known by his birth name Lee Hee-seung (born 2001), Korean soloist and singer-songwriter
