= Jerome Lowenthal =

American pianist (born 1932)

- Born: February 11, 1932 (age 94); Philadelphia, Pennsylvania, U.S.
- Origin: American
- Occupations: Classical pianist
- Label: Navona Records

Jerome Lowenthal (born February 11, 1932) is an American classical pianist. He has served as chair of the piano department at the Juilliard School in New York. Additionally, Lowenthal is on the faculty at Music Academy of the West in Montecito, California.

Lowenthal was born in Philadelphia to a Jewish family. He made his debut as a solo pianist at the age of 13 with the Philadelphia Orchestra. Returning to the United States from Jerusalem in 1963, he made his debut with the New York Philharmonic, playing Bartók's Piano Concerto No. 2. Since then, he has performed with famous conductors such as Daniel Barenboim, Seiji Ozawa, Michael Tilson Thomas, Yuri Temirkanov, Leonard Slatkin, Leonard Bernstein, Eugene Ormandy, Pierre Monteux, Josef Krips, and Leopold Stokowski. He has played sonatas with Itzhak Perlman, piano duos with Ronit Amir, and with Ursula Oppens, as well as quintets with the Lark Quartet, Avalon Quartet, and Shanghai Quartet.

His studies included lessons with Eleanor Sokoloff and Olga Samaroff in Philadelphia, William Kapell and Eduard Steuermann at the Juilliard School in New York, and Alfred Cortot at the École Normale de Musique de Paris in Paris, France. A prizewinner at Queen Elisabeth Music Competition in Brussels (1960) and Busoni Competition, he is a frequent judge in international piano competitions.

He is recognized as a specialist of Franz Liszt, Pyotr Tchaikovsky, Béla Bartók, and more generally of virtuoso and late romantic music. His recordings include piano concertos by Liszt with the Vancouver Symphony Orchestra and the complete Tchaikovsky concerto cycle with the London Symphony Orchestra. He has an extensive repertoire, including 59 performed piano concerti. He is the dedicatee of many new works, such as Ned Rorem's Piano Concerto (No. 3) in Six Movements, and has unearthed some rare romantic piano works, such as the Liszt Third Piano Concerto edited by his former student Jay Rosenblatt.

== Notable students ==
Notable students of Jerome Lowenthal include: Víkingur Ólafsson, Alpin Hong, Eliot Goldmund (formerly Euntaek Kim), Ory Shihor, Evan Shinners, Hershey Felder, Jay Rosenblatt, Michael Stephen Brown, Micah McLaurin, Orion Weiss, Paul Kim, Soyeon Kate Lee, Vassily Primakov, Xinran Shi, and Jay Rosenblatt.
