= Jittery Joe's (cycling team) =

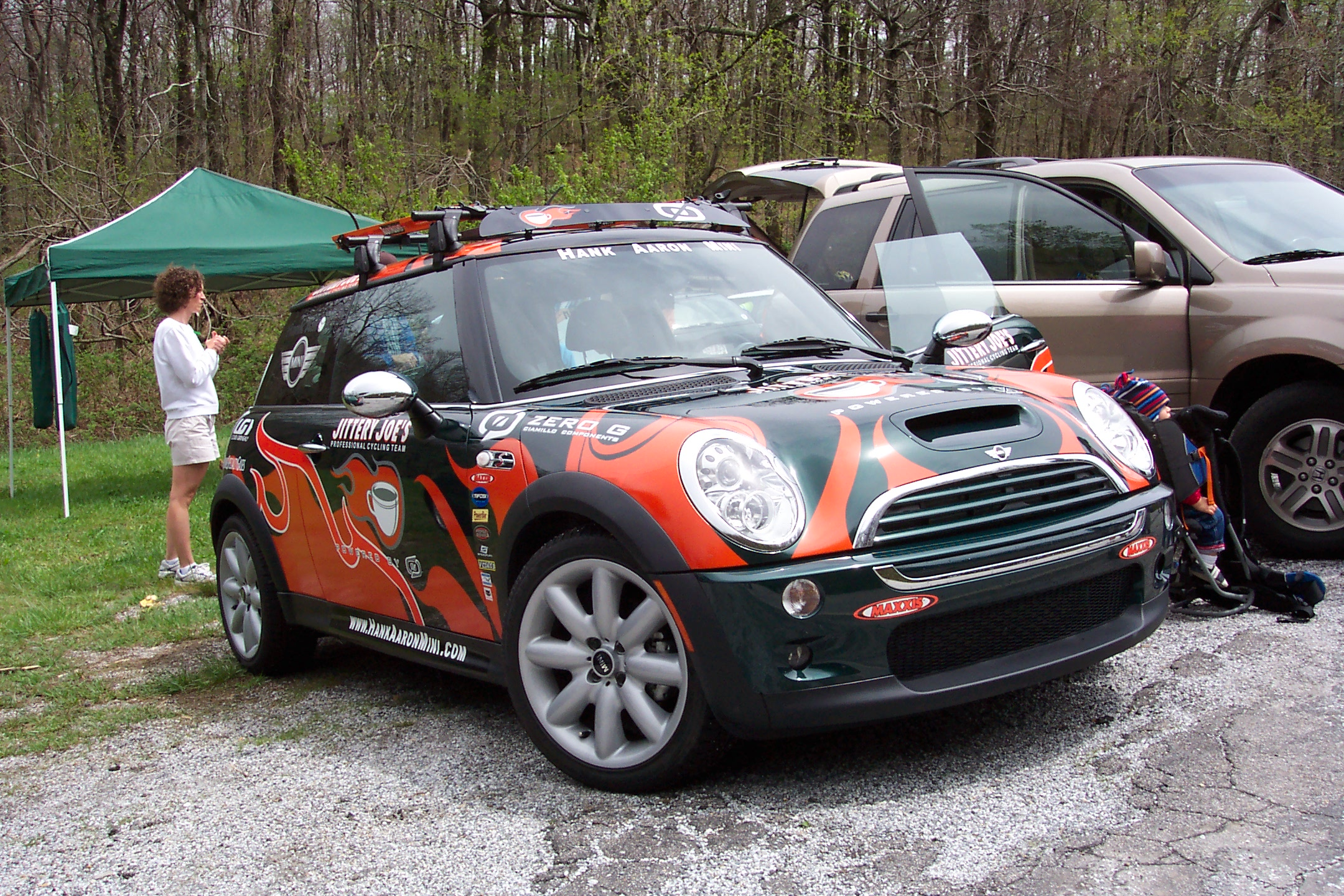
- Mini Cooper team car

Team information
- UCI code: JIT
- Registered: United States
- Founded: 2002
- Disbanded: 2008
- Discipline: Road
- Status: UCI Continental

Team name history
- 2002–2004 2005 2006 2007–2008: Jittery Joe's; Jittery Joe's–Kalahari; Jittery Joe's–Zero Gravity; The Jittery Joe's Pro Cycling Team

Jittery Joe's (UCI Code: JIT) was a UCI Continental team consisting of professional and amateur riders that competed primarily in USA Cycling Professional Tour and UCI America Tour road bicycle racing events.

Its sponsor was the American coffehouse chain, Jittery Joe's. In 2006, for the fifth year in a row, the company served as the premier title sponsor of the cycling team, which competed in road bicycle racing events throughout the United States and raced internationally in Australia and South Africa.

== 2008 Team ==
Rider	Date of birth
Jared Barrilleaux (USA)
Jonathan Cantwell (AUS)
Evan Elken (USA)	February 17, 1977 (age 49)
Chad Hartley (USA)	June 20, 1981 (age 45)
Timothy Henry (USA)	August 16, 1982 (age 44)
Ben Kneller (USA)

Rider	Date of birth
Neil Shirley (USA)	October 19, 1978 (age 47)
Matt Shriver (USA)	May 26, 1980 (age 46)
Cody Stevenson (AUS)	June 8, 1980 (age 46)
Ryan Sullivan (AUS)
Trent Wilson (AUS)	November 18, 1978 (age 47)

== Major wins ==
2006 – Jittery Joe's-Zero Gravity

- Trent Wilson – 3rd overall, San Dimas Stage Race, Stage Winner Herald Sun Tour
- Jeff Hopkins – 5th overall, USA Crits series (3rd: Sunny King Criterium; 3rd: Walterboro Criterium), 1st 10K Classic
- Peter Hatton – 9th overall, San Dimas Stage Race, 6th Charlotte International
- Austin King – 3rd, Valley of the Sun stage race
- Neil Shirley – Stage winner Cascade Classic

2005 – Jittery Joe's-Kalahari

- Trent Lowe – Best Young Rider Jersey Winner, Tour de Georgia

2004 – Jittery Joe's

- Cesar Grajales Calle – 7th overall and Stage 6 winner, Tour de Georgia

2003 – Jittery Joe's
2002 – Jittery Joe's
