= Evan Marshall =

Evan Marshall may refer to:

- Evan Marshall (cricketer) (born 1970), New Zealand cricketer
- Evan Marshall (agent) (born 1956), literary agent and author
- Evan Marshall (baseball) (born 1990), American baseball pitcher
- Evan Marshall (musician), mandolinist
