= Evan Rees =

Evan Rees may refer to:

- Evan Rees (rugby) (1896-1978), Welsh rugby union and rugby league footballer who played in the 1910s
- Evan Rees (Dyfed) (1850–1923), Calvinistic Methodist minister, poet, and Archdruid of the National Eisteddfod of Wales
- Evan Rees (Australian footballer) (1923–2004), Australian rules football player for Footscray
