= Evan Jones =

Evan Jones may refer to:

== Politicians ==
- Evan O. Jones (1830–1915), Wisconsin politician
- Evan John Jones (politician) (1872–1952), American Republican politician
- Sir Evan Jones, 1st Baronet (1859–1949), Welsh civil engineer and politician
- Evan Rowland Jones (1840–1920), Welsh politician, MP for Carmarthen Boroughs

== Poets ==
- Evan Jones (Australian poet) (1931–2022), Australian poet and professor
- Evan Jones (Canadian poet) (born 1973), Canadian poet and critic

== Sportspeople ==
- Evan Jones (cricketer) (born 1996), South African cricketer
- Evan Jones (footballer) (1888–?), Welsh international footballer
- Evan Jones (swimmer) (born 2004), Scottish swimmer
- Evan Jones (bowls), Welsh lawn bowler
- Evan Jones (Canadian football) from 1978 CFL draft

== Others ==
- Evan Benjamin Gareth Jones (born 1937), British mycologist
- Evan Jones (pirate) (fl. 1698–1699), pirate captain active near Madagascar and the African coast
- Evan Jones (missionary) (1820–1872), Baptist missionary to the Cherokees and leader of one group on the Trail of Tears
- Evan John Jones (witch) (1936–2003), English occultist
- Evan Jones (Stitch Media), Canadian interactive producer
- Evan Jones (Farmers Alliance) (1846–1899), president of the Texas Farmers Alliance
- Evan Jones (Blue Heelers), fictional character from the Australian TV series Blue Heelers
- Evan Jones (writer) (1927–2023), Jamaican writer
- E. D. Jones (1903–1987), librarian of the National Library of Wales in Aberystwyth, 1958–1969
- Evan Jones (actor) (born 1976), American actor
- Evan Jones (Ieuan Gwynedd) (1820–1852), Welsh campaigner and journalist
- Evan Jones (Gurnos), see 1871 in Wales
- Evan Jones (Calvinistic Methodist), see Henry Edwards (priest)
- Evan Jones (Ifan y Gorlan), harpist, died in 1859 in Wales
- Evan Jones (author) for Rivers of America Series
- Evan Jones (rapper), American rapper from Miami, Florida
- Evan Jones (musician), Australian musician
- Evan Jones (police officer), English police officer
