= Evan Johnson =

Evan Johnson may refer to:

- Evan Johnson (Canadian football) (born 1994), Canadian football offensive lineman
- Evan Johnson (filmmaker), Canadian filmmaker
- Evan M. Johnson (1861–1923), United States Army officer
- Evan LeRoy Johnson, American operatic tenor
- Evan Malbone Johnson (1791–1865), American Episcopal priest
- James Johnson (wrestler, born 1954), known as Evan, American Olympic wrestler

== See also ==
- Ewan Johnson (born 1999), Scotland international rugby union player
