= Evan Cole =

American businessman

Evan Cole (born 1 January 1961) is the American founder and CEO of H.D. Buttercup, a home furnishings and interiors retailer. Born and raised in Queens, New York, Cole attended Boston University when he was 16 years old.

== Career ==
Cole's entrepreneurial journey started when he secured the first-ever licenses to sell IBM personal computers and franchise retail VAR One Hour Photos. He also ran a seasonal holiday store called the Holiday Spirit before entering the home furnishings industry.

In 1982, Cole joined the ABC Carpet Store on 19th Street and Broadway in New York. He expanded the product line by adding an eclectic mix of rugs, antiques, linens, bodums, furniture, lighting, and accessories. He founded ABC Home in 1985 and opened their first restaurant in 1997. Cole introduced the home as a fashion concept. In 1994, Cole received the NRF (National Retail Federation) Retailer of the Year award.

The company's annual revenue grew from $3 million in 1982 to $170 million in 2004, the same time when he left the company.

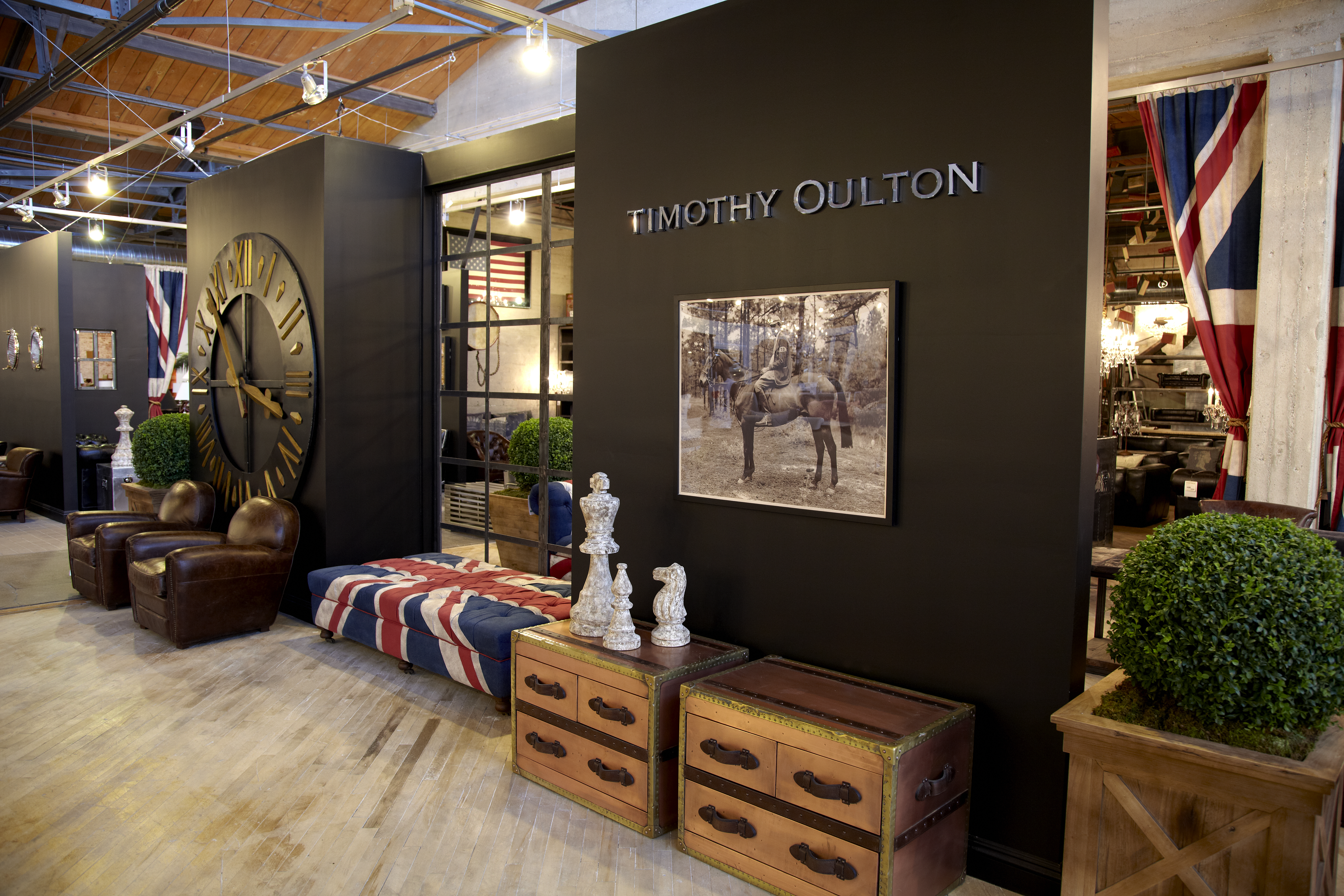
Entrance to the Timothy Oulton Gallery at H.D. Buttercup

In 2005, Cole opened the first H.D. Buttercup store in the historic Helms Bakery complex in Los Angeles, which had over 100,000 square feet (9,300 m²) of maple floors, red brick walls, and 30-foot exposed beams. The store is powered by solar electricity and carries furniture, gifts and accessories. The space houses showrooms of designers Timothy Oulton, Andrew Martin, Stark Carpet, Lillian August, and Cisco Brothers.

In 2010, Cole opened a ~500-square-foot H.D. Buttercup store in the SOMA neighborhood (South of Market, San Francisco) of San Francisco.

In 2014, H.D. Buttercup opened a ~44,000-square-foot store at the SOCO design centre in Costa Mesa, Orange County.

In 2015, H.D. Buttercup opened a ~25,000-square-foot store in Santa Monica at the former Fred Segal store and a new ~30,000-square-foot headquarters and company store in the Arts District in Downtown Los Angeles.

Cole is an active real estate investor. In 2007, he paid $4.8 million for a 2,500 sq ft (230 m^{2}) apartment at 15 Central Park West. In 2011, he put it on the market for $9 million. Cole was cited by Conde Nast Portfolio Magazine as the Personal Finance Winner in the December 2008 issue.

== Awards ==
- NRF (National Retail Federation) Retailer of the Year Award, 1994
- Personal Finance Winner, Portfolio Magazine, December 2008.
