= Trent Wilson =

Australian bicycle racer (born 1978)

Personal information
- Born: 18 November 1978 (age 47) Sydney, Australia

Cycling career
- Sport: Cycling
- Current team: Retired
- Discipline: Road
- Role: Rider

Amateur team
- 2001: Team Fakta (stagiaire)

Professional teams
- 2002–2003: iTeamNova.com
- 2004–2005: Colombia–Selle Italia
- 2006–2008: Jittery Joe's–Zero Gravity

Trent Wilson (born 18 November 1978) is an Australian former professional road cyclist. He rode in the 2004 and 2005 Giro d'Italia.

== Major results ==
2000
8th Overall Herald Sun Tour
2001
9th Overall Herald Sun Tour
2002
5th Overall Herald Sun Tour
2006
1st Stage 3 Herald Sun Tour
2007
6th Lancaster Classic
7th U.S. Cycling Open
