= Brian Sullivan =

Brian Sullivan may refer to:

- Brian Sullivan (news anchor) (born 1971), presenter of programs on CNBC
- Brian Sullivan (district attorney) (1966–2014), politician from Tacoma, Washington
- Brian Sullivan (Washington politician, born 1958), politician from Snohomish County, Washington
- Brian Sullivan (game designer), co-founder of Iron Lore Entertainment and founding partner of Ensemble Studios
- Brian Sullivan (ice hockey) (born 1969), retired ice hockey right winger
- Brian Ford Sullivan, American television writer
- Brian P. Sullivan (born 1963), mayor of Westfield, Massachusetts
- Brian Sullivan (tenor) (1917–1969), with the Metropolitan Opera, San Francisco Opera, the Lyric Opera of Chicago, and other groups
- Brian Sullivan (New Hampshire politician), member of the New Hampshire House of Representatives
- Brian Sullivan (died 1938), a suspect in the Cheltenham torso mystery
- Brian Sullivan, developer of the Babe Ruth Home Run Award

== See also ==
- Brian O'Sullivan (disambiguation)
- Ryan Sullivan (disambiguation)
