= Evan Thomas (mariner) =

Welsh mariner (1875–1957)

Commander Evan Thomas DSC
- Born: 12 May 1875; Aberporth, Cardiganshire, Wales
- Died: 26 October 1957 (aged 82); Aberporth, Cardiganshire, Wales
- Spouse: Elizabeth Owens (m. 1909)
- Children: 4
- Military career
- Allegiance: United Kingdom
- Branch: British Merchant Navy
- Rank: Captain
- Conflicts: World War I
- Awards: Distinguished Service Cross; Lloyd's Medal for Meritorious Service (Silver); Mercantile Marine War Medal; British War Medal

Captain Evan Thomas DSC (12 May 1875 – 26 October 1957) was a Welsh master mariner in the British Merchant Navy, recognised for his service during the First World War. He was awarded the Distinguished Service Cross and the Lloyd's Medal for Meritorious Service for his leadership in defending his vessel against submarine attack in the Mediterranean.

== Early life ==
Evan Thomas was born on 12 May 1875 in Aberporth, Cardiganshire, Wales. He married Elizabeth Owens on 12 January 1909 at Tabernacle Chapel, Pendre, Cardigan. Elizabeth was born on 3 October 1883 in Blaenporth, the daughter of Captain John Owens, a Master Mariner, and his wife Mary Morgan.

== Maritime career ==
By 1911, Thomas was serving as Master of the SS Alacrity of Belfast. During the First World War, he commanded the SS Lindenhall, a 4,300-ton merchant steamer, contributing to wartime logistics in dangerous waters.

On 1 November 1916, while steaming west of Sicily, the Lindenhall encountered a vessel resembling a sailing ship. Though no wind was present, the ship moved quickly, and Thomas suspected it to be a disguised submarine. His suspicions proved correct when a shell landed off the starboard bow.

Thomas manoeuvred to bring the submarine astern and returned fire with the ship's gun. A prolonged engagement followed, with the submarine firing over 200 shells in one hour and forty-five minutes. Despite sustaining damage to the bridge and lifeboats, the Lindenhall continued evasive action and fired 86 shells before the submarine submerged and withdrew. In his official report, Thomas commended the officers, engineers, stewards, carpenter, cook and gunners for fighting and steaming the vessel unaided, as the sailors and firemen had refused to assist.

== Decorations ==
Captain Thomas was recognised for his actions and wartime service with several awards:

- The Distinguished Service Cross (11 April 1919), for "zeal and devotion to duty shown in carrying on the trade of the country during the war."
- Lloyd's Medal for Meritorious Service (silver) (16 October 1918), awarded by Lloyd's of London for "extraordinary exertions" contributing to the preservation of vessels and cargoes. Award confirmed in the National Archives record.
- The Mercantile Marine War Medal (4 July 1921).
- The British War Medal and Mercantile Marine Ribbon (12 May 1920).

== Later life ==
Captain Thomas died on 26 October 1957 at Rosehill, Aberporth. His wife Elizabeth died on 24 January 1961 in Pulborough, West Sussex. He had two sons, John Henry Thomas (1909–1925) and Thomas Phillips Thomas (1911–1918), and two daughters, Mary Ellen James (1915–1956) and Margaret Anne Morgan Wright (1919–2007).
