= Real World Haskell =

Real World Haskell is an O'Reilly Media book, ISBN 978-0-596-51498-3, about the programming language Haskell by Bryan O'Sullivan, Don Stewart, and John Goerzen. It features a rhinoceros beetle as its mascot on the cover. It won a 2009 Jolt Award.
