= Evan Jones (Farmers Alliance) =

American politician (1846–1899)

Evan Jones (June 19, 1846 – January 26, 1899) was the President of the Texas Farmers' Alliance. He advocated for cooperative farming and populist political activism.

The newly created Texas Union Labor Party nominated Jones as the candidate for governor in August 1888, but he declined, opting instead to commit entirely to Farmers Alliance activities. He unsuccessfully ran for Congress as a Populist Party candidate in 1892.
