= Evan Schwartz =

Evan Schwartz may refer to:

- Evan Schwartz (author), American author
- Evan Schwartz (soccer) (born 1987), American soccer player
