= Evan Bryant =

British missionary (1839–1918)

Evan Bryant (April 22, 1839 – March 28, 1918) was a Congregational missionary to China who served initially with the London Missionary Society and then the British and Foreign Bible Society (1884–1892) during the late Qing Dynasty China.

In March 1887 Bryant reached Seoul for the purpose of prospecting the country for the work of the British and Foreign Bible Society.
