= Evan Nagao =

American competitive yo-yoer (born 1996)

- Born: May 3, 1996 (age 30); Honolulu, Hawaii, U.S.
- Occupations: Musician and competitive yo-yo player
- Employer: None

Evan Nagao (born May 3, 1996) is a musician and competitive yo-yo player. He is known for being the 2018 World Yo-Yo Champion and 5 time US National Yoyo Champion (2017, 2018, 2022, 2023 1a division, 2023 2a division).

== Biography ==
Evan Nagao was born in 1996 in Honolulu, Hawaii. He was introduced to yoyoing at a young age by his father, Alan Nagao, who was an entrepreneur and important figure in the yoyo boom of the '90s. He was proficient in 2A yoyoing by the age of three, and was invited to various TV shows as a yoyo prodigy when he was four. However, he soon found yoyoing to be repetitive, and after a couple of years he took a lengthy hiatus to focus on other aspects of his youth.

After his hiatus from yo-yoing, Nagao had the opportunity to try a newer unresponsive yo-yo in a Redondo Beach kite shop in 2009. Nagao was blown away by the improvement in yo-yo technology, and was inspired to return to yo-yoing. He caught up with the tricks of the time, and entered the competitive yo-yo scene. He participated in various yoyo competitions in 2009 and 2010. Dismal results in these competitions discouraged him, and he took another hiatus from the sport.

In 2014, Nagao decided to reenter the competitive yoyo scene. After being disappointed by his result in the 2014 West Coast Yo-Yo Contest, Nagao sought to learn more about the judging system. Over the next few years, he mastered various aspects of the system, allowing him to do better every year. After his performance at the 2015 National Yo-Yo Contest, Nagao was sponsored by Yoyofactory.

In 2017, Nagao won the National Yo-Yo Contest. He won the National Yo-Yo Contest again in 2018, and went on to win the World Yo-Yo Contest that same year.

In 2019, Nagao appeared in the Netflix documentary "We Are the Champions ep. 4" where he announced his retirement from the competitive yoyo scene to pursue a career in music.

After the COVID-19 pandemic subsided enough for yoyo competitions to be held, Nagao returned to the competitive scene again and won the 2022, and 2023 National Yoyo Contests.

== Competitive career ==
Evan Nagao's Competitive Career Rankings at Various Yo-Yo Contests
	2010	2014	2015	2016	2017	2018	2019	2022	2023
World Yo-Yo Contest				14	6	1	2		3
National Yo-Yo Contest		6	5	4	1	1		1	1
PNWR				1	4	4			
EYYC Open					1				
West Coast	N/A	5							
California State Yo-Yo Contest	10			4					
Southwest Regional Yo-Yo Contest	6								
United Yo-Yo Contest									1

== Musical works ==
Evan debuted with his first single "Waves" in June 2019. He used his second single, "The Last Stand," as the music for his routine at the 2019 World Yo-Yo Contest, which was released shortly after. In June 2020 Nagao released his third single, "Me entiendes".

In November 2020, Nagao released his debut album titled Love, which included 10 new songs.
