= Evan Marshall (cricketer) =

New Zealand cricketer (born 1970)

Evan James Marshall (born 29 January 1970) is a New Zealand former cricketer who played for Otago in first-class and List A cricket between the 1991–92 and 2001–02 seasons.

Marshall was born at Invercargill in 1970 and educated at James Hargest High School in the city. After playing age-group cricket for Otago in the 1989–90 season and a Hawke Cup match for Southland in March 1990, he made his first-class debut for an Emerging New Zealand Players side against the touring Sri Lankans in January 1991. He went on to make his full Otago debut the following season and played 24 first-class and 41 List A matches for the provincial side before retiring from top-level cricket after the 1995–96 season. The seven wickets for 49 runs he took in a List A match against Auckland at Carisbrook in 1993–94 were an Otago record for best bowling in List A cricket until 2020.

Marshall played club cricket for Albion Cricket Club in Dunedin and in 2013 was named in the best Albion side from the previous 20 years. In the 2001–02 season he made a comeback to top-level cricket with Otago, although in the even he played only one further first-class match for the side.
