= Evan Brown =

Evan Brown may refer to:

- Evan Brown (soccer) (born 1987), American soccer player
- Evan Brown (American football) (born 1996), American football offensive lineman
