= Evan Morgan =

Evan Morgan may refer to:

- Evan Morgan, 2nd Viscount Tredegar, Welsh poet and author
- Evan Morgan (filmmaker)
