= Evan Stewart =

Evan Stewart may refer to:

- Evan Stewart (diver) (born 1975), Zimbabwean diver
- Evan Stewart (American football) (born 2003), American football player
- Evan George Stewart (1892–1958), British soldier and missionary
