= Evan Lee (artist) =

Canadian visual artist (born 1975)

- Born: 1975 (age 50–51); Vancouver, British Columbia, Canada
- Education: University of British Columbia (BFA, 1997; MFA, 2000)

Evan Lee (born 1975) is a Canadian visual artist born and based in Vancouver, British Columbia. Working across photography, painting, drawing, sculpture and digital imaging, he is known for experimental approaches to photography including camera-less images produced using flatbed scanners. Lee was longlisted for the Sobey Art Award in 2009 and selected as the West Coast and Yukon finalist in 2014.

== Career ==
Lee received a BFA from the University of British Columbia in 1997 and an MFA in 2000. He began working in drawing and painting before becoming increasingly interested in photography. Between 2004 and 2006, he developed several bodies of camera-less photographic work using a desktop scanner in place of a camera. In 2006, Presentation House Gallery presented Evan Lee: Captures: Selected Works, 1998–2006, an overview of his work since 1998.

Lee was longlisted for the Sobey Art Award in 2009. His work was included in In Dialogue with Carr (2010–11) at the Vancouver Art Gallery, which paired the work of Emily Carr with that of Lee, Douglas Coupland, Liz Magor and Marianne Nicolson. In 2014, Lee was selected as the West Coast and Yukon finalist for the Sobey Art Award and participated in the finalists' exhibition at the Winnipeg Art Gallery. In 2017, his work was included in Pictures From Here at the Vancouver Art Gallery, an exhibition surveying lens-based practices concerned with Vancouver and its surroundings.

Lee's later work has continued to move between photography and painting. His 2019 exhibition Full Circle received an Artforum Critics' Pick, and his installation Fugazi at Simon Fraser University's Teck Gallery was the subject of a 2020 essay by Clint Burnham in The Capilano Review. In a 2024 interview with the Vancouver Art Gallery, Lee described his earlier practice as using photographic technologies to explore ideas associated with painting and his more recent work as shifting toward paintings based on photography and digital images.
