= Evan Fraser =

Evan Fraser may refer to:

- Evan Fraser of Balconie, namesake of the town Evanton
- Evan Eugene Fraser (1865–1949), Ontario contractor and political figure
- Evan Fraser (academic), Canadian author and professor of geography
