= Evan Llewellyn =

Evan Llewellyn may refer to:

- Evan Llewelyn (1875–1967), Australian politician
- Evan Henry Llewellyn (1847–1914), British Army officer and politician
