= Evan Shinners =

American musician

Evan Shinners (born 1986) is an American-British pianist, harpsichordist, and conductor He is known under the pseudonym WTF Bach, and is the founder of The Bach Store, a pop-up venue which transforms vacant storefronts into temporary concert spaces. A devoted specialist to the music of J.S. Bach, he is the creator of the WTF Bach Podcast. He is a winner of the Inaugural Alumni Enterprise Award from the Music Academy of the West, and is a Yamaha Artist.

Evan Shinners is a graduate of The Juilliard School, where he studied with Jerome Lowenthal.

== Discography ==
=== As Evan Shinners ===
- @Bach (2011)
- J.S. Bach Toccatas BWV 910-916 (2013)
- J.S. Bach English Suites (2018)
- J.S. Bach French Suites (2018)
- J.S. Bach Organ Sonatas (2018)
- The Shape of Bach to Come (2018)
- J.S. Bach: Complete Fantasies for Solo Keyboard (2020)
- J.S. Bach: Complete Keyboard Works Vol.1 - Five Early Suites (2024)
- J.S. Bach: Complete Keyboard Works Vol.2 - Original Compositions for Lute (2024)
- J.S. Bach: Complete Keyboard Works Vol.3 - Misc. Preludes and Fugues Pt. One (2024)
- J.S. Bach: Complete Keyboard Works Vol.4 - Partitas, Pt. One (2025)

=== As W.T.F. Bach ===
- Jello Sweets (2016)
- Shining Charles (HUGE VIBE) (2016)
- Englisch (2019)
- V!va (2019)
