= Evan Comerford =

Evan Comerford may refer to:

- Evan Comerford (Tipperary Gaelic footballer) (born 1994)
- Evan Comerford (Dublin Gaelic footballer) (born 1998)
