= Evan Jenkins =

Evan Jenkins may refer to:

- Evan Jenkins (politician) (born 1960), American politician from West Virginia
- Evan Jenkins (footballer) (1906–1990), Welsh football winger
- Evan Meredith Jenkins (1896–1985), British colonial administrator
