= Evan Green =

Evan Green may refer to:

- Evan Green (journalist) (1930–1996), Australian motoring publicist, journalist, TV commentator, and novelist
- Evan Green (footballer) (born 1993), Gibraltarian footballer
