= Evan Forde =

American oceanographer

Evan B. Forde
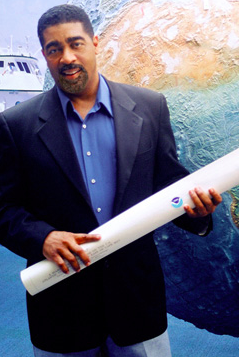
- Born: Miami, Florida
- Education: Columbia University (B.A., M.A.)
- Occupation: Oceanographer
- Employer: NOAA
- Awards: Congressional Commendation, 2008; South Florida Federal Employee of the Year, 2009; Administrator's and Technology Transfer Award, 2011
- Website: https://www.thehistorymakers.org/biography/evan-forde

Evan B. Forde is an American oceanographer at the Atlantic Oceanographic & Meteorological Laboratory (AOML) with the National Oceanic & Atmospheric Administration (NOAA). He was the first African-American scientist to perform research in a submersible. Forde is widely considered an expert on the formation of submarine canyons and his recent research uses satellite sensors to analyze atmospheric conditions related to hurricane formation.

== Education ==
Forde was born in Miami, Florida, and received his primary education in the Miami-Dade County public schools. He received his Bachelor of Arts (B.A.) degree in Geology with an oceanography specialty in 1974 followed by his Master of Arts (M.A.) degree in marine geology and geophysics from Columbia University. Forde became a researcher in the Marine Geology and Geophysics laboratory at the National Oceanic and Atmospheric Administration's (NOAA) Atlantic Oceanographic and Meteorological Laboratory (AOML) while an undergraduate at Columbia during the summer of 1973. Forde has stated that French oceanographer Jacques Cousteau was a large inspiration in his love of oceanography.

== Research ==
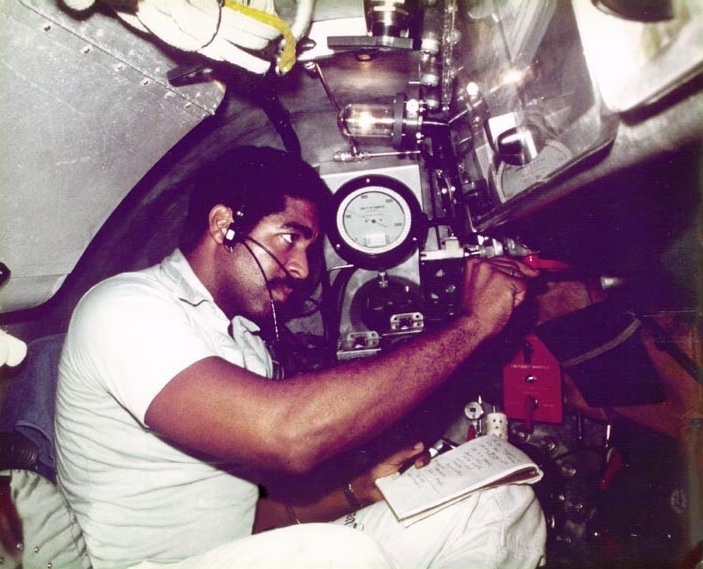
Evan Forde working in a deep-sea submersible.

After earning his M.A., Forde worked at NOAA AOML in Miami mapping the Atlantic sea floor. In 1979, Forde became the first African-American oceanographer to conduct a research mission aboard a submersible craft when he dove in the Nekton Gamma. He subsequently completed submersible dive expeditions in Alvin in 1980 and the Johnson Sea Link in 1981. One of his most significant discoveries was the submarine sediment slide off the coast of New Jersey, which caused New Jersey offshore drilling to stop in 1980.

Soon after, Forde begun to research hydrothermal plumes and satellite-tracking of hurricanes to improve hurricane forecasting and intensity prediction models. This is still a large part of his current research, and it has expanded to include threat mitigation and training exercises for hurricane response. He has additionally conducted research on the effects that dust storms from Africa have on the formation of Atlantic basin hurricanes.

Utilizing his background in classical Marine Geology techniques, Forde became a recognized authority on the formation, evolution, and sedimentary processes of east coast U.S. submarine canyons. Additional scientific research efforts by Forde have included studies of gravity-induced mass sediment movements on continental slopes, 3-dimensional mapping of hydrothermal plumes, and the study of ocean-atmosphere exchange of anthropogenic carbon dioxide.

== Leadership and outreach ==
Forde has also worked extensively in the area of science education. He authored science experiments in multiple children's magazines, including "Science Corner" in Ebony Jr!, with custom-made experiments for several years, and created a Severe Weather Poster for NOAA that was distributed nationally to 50,000 teachers by the National Science Teachers Association. He has spoken to more than 40,000 school children through presentations about his oceanographic and academic careers. Forde created and taught a graduate level tropical meteorology course for the University of Miami's INSTAR program for seven years, and also created and teaches an oceanography course for middle school students called Oceanographic Curriculum Empowering Achievement in Natural Sciences (OCEANS). Forde has been the subject of three museum exhibits, and has been featured in numerous periodical articles, text books and many other publications on prominent African American scientists.

In addition to his scientific career, Evan Forde has served as a PTA President, a church trustee, Scoutmaster, youth basketball coach, church webmaster, Sunday School and youth ministry teacher, neighborhood Crime Watch chairman and in numerous other roles that have fostered youth and improved his community. He has initiated programs to combat community food scarcity and actively supports NOAA's Equal Opportunity Employment (EEO) initiatives.

== Awards and recognitions ==
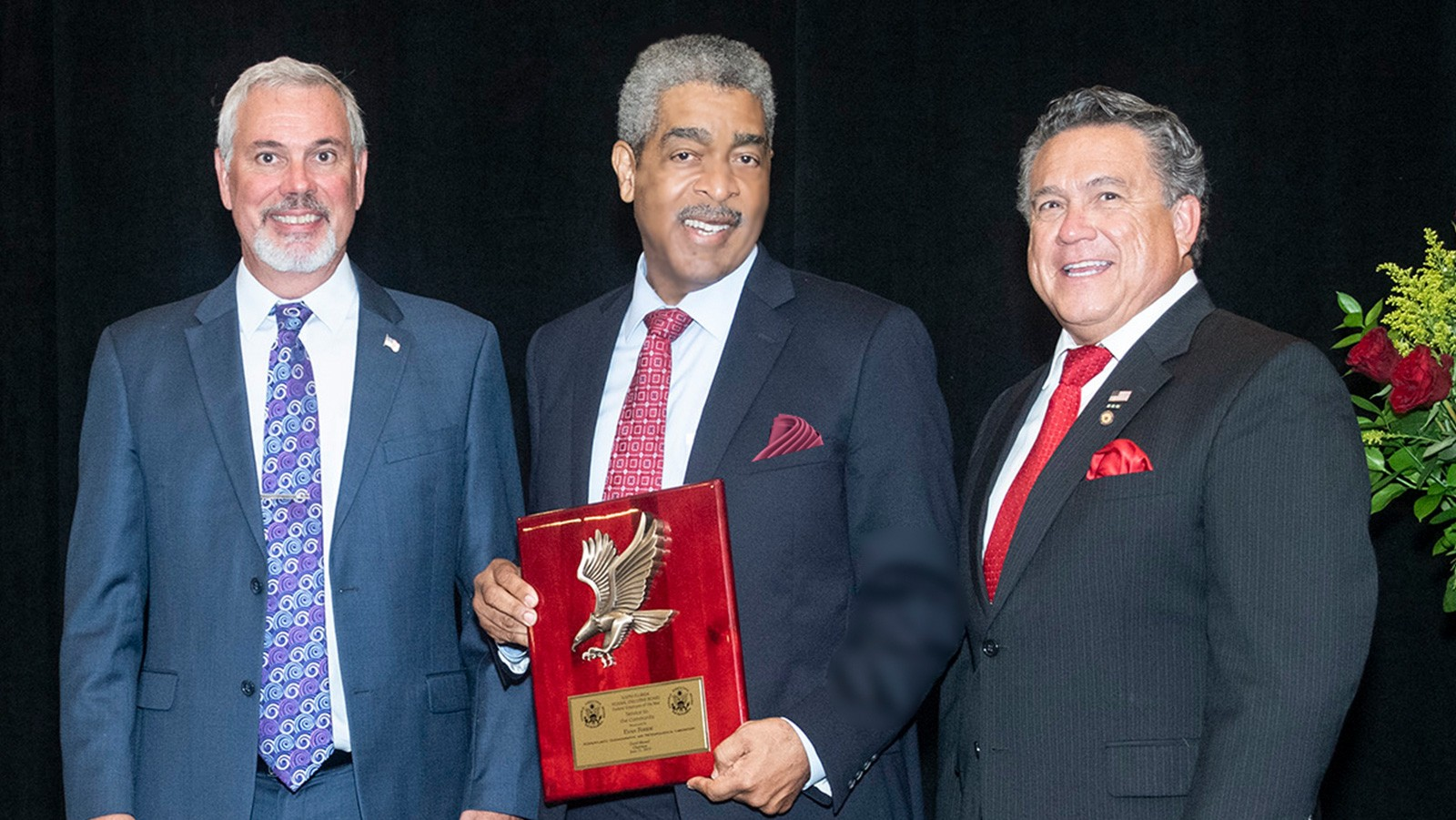
Forde received the award for the Federal Employee of the Year for the Service to the Community category at the 54th annual South Florida Federal Executive Board's banquet on June 21st, 2019.

In 2001, Forde was named NOAA Research Employee of the Year. In 2008, he was recognized as South Florida's Federal Employee of the Year in the Service to the Community Category, along with a Congressional Commendation. "Evan B. Forde" days were celebrated in the City of North Miami on February 10, 2009, and Miami-Dade County on April 21, 2009. In 2011, he also received the NOAA Administrator's (Under Secretary of Commerce) Award for outstanding communication of NOAA science. Additionally, Forde has been the recipient of a host of career and community awards that include being named NOAA's Environmental Research Laboratories EEO Outstanding Employee.
