= Evan Lewis =

Evan Lewis may refer to:

- Evan Lewis (wrestler) (1860–1919), professional wrestler
- Evan Lewis (politician) (1869–1941), Los Angeles politician
- Evan Lewis (priest) (1818–1901), Welsh clergyman, dean of Bangor Cathedral, 1884–1901
- Evan Lewis (Final Destination), a character in Final Destination 2
- Evan Lewis (Neighbours), a character from the Australian soap opera Neighbours

== See also ==
- Evin Lewis (born 1991), Trinidadian cricketer
