= Evan Baxter =

Evan Baxter may refer to:

- Evan Baxter, fictional character in Bruce Almighty and Evan Almighty
- Evan Buchanan Baxter (1844–1885), Russian-born Scottish physician
