= Evan Zimmermann =

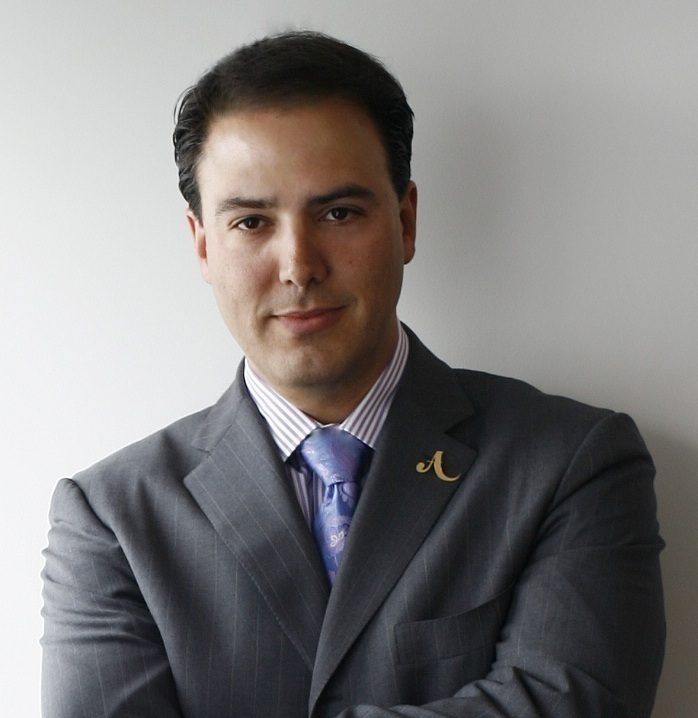
- Zimmermann in 2007
- Born: New York City
- Occupations: Businessman, investor and philanthropist

Evan Zimmermann is an American businessman, investor and philanthropist. He was the president and CEO of Antiquorum, a Swiss auction house, established in 1974, that specializes in watches.

== Career ==
Zimmermann is known for developing and implementing brand growth strategies. In 2008, he purchased Antiquorum, an international auction house based in Switzerland, in a $30 million deal. He subsequently strengthened the company's principal expertise by streamlining its irrelevant business lines and finances.

Over the next 10 years, the company experienced growth in its auction sales from $37 million to $90 million. Zimmermann was instrumental in solidifying Antiquorum's position as the largest watch auction house in the world.

Under his management, Antiquorum sold Mahatma Gandhi's pocket watch for just under $2.1 million, Steve McQueen's Rolex Submariner for $234,000 (more than 20 times its estimate), setting a new world record for its reference, and Albert Einstein's Longines wristwatch for $596,000 (over 2000 percent of its estimate). In February 2014 Zimmermann expressed his delight about the fervent participation of Asian clients in a Hong Kong auction of a Platinum Patek watch which sold for $800,000.

In 2018, after an initial minority investment in the company's European operations, FIDES Business Partner, a private equity firm based in Zurich, Switzerland, bought Antiquorum from Zimmermann for $154 million.

After the sale of Antiquorum, Zimmermann invested significantly in the IPO of Moderna, a then unknown pharmaceutical and biotech company. Moderna thereafter received FDA approval for one of the first COVID-19 vaccines, which sent its share price soaring.

Zimmermann has been recognized by Forbes as an important collector of vintage Rolex watches and as one of the major investors in fashion industry startups. He developed an interest in the fashion industry through his family brand Zimmermann, and has made investments in numerous companies, including Farfetch, Rent the Runway, and Glossier.

In 2022, Zimmermann and Amazon founder Jeff Bezos were among several entrepreneurs who collectively invested £230 million into Altos Labs, an American biotech research company. Altos Labs is a startup that focuses on developing therapies to reverse the aging process and extend human lifespan.

== Philanthropy ==
In 2021, Zimmermann, through his foundation Zimmermann Family Charitable Trust, donated $3 million to the University of California to support initiatives concerning the causes and aftermath of the Holocaust, as well as the examination of human rights, safeguarding minority rights, and addressing historical wrongs and injustices.

In 2023, Zimmermann, through the Zimmermann Family Charitable Trust, pledged $2 million to Water Org. This funding aimed to enhance access to sustainable water and sanitation services in developing countries, where inefficient water infrastructure exacerbated climate impacts and limited access to clean water.

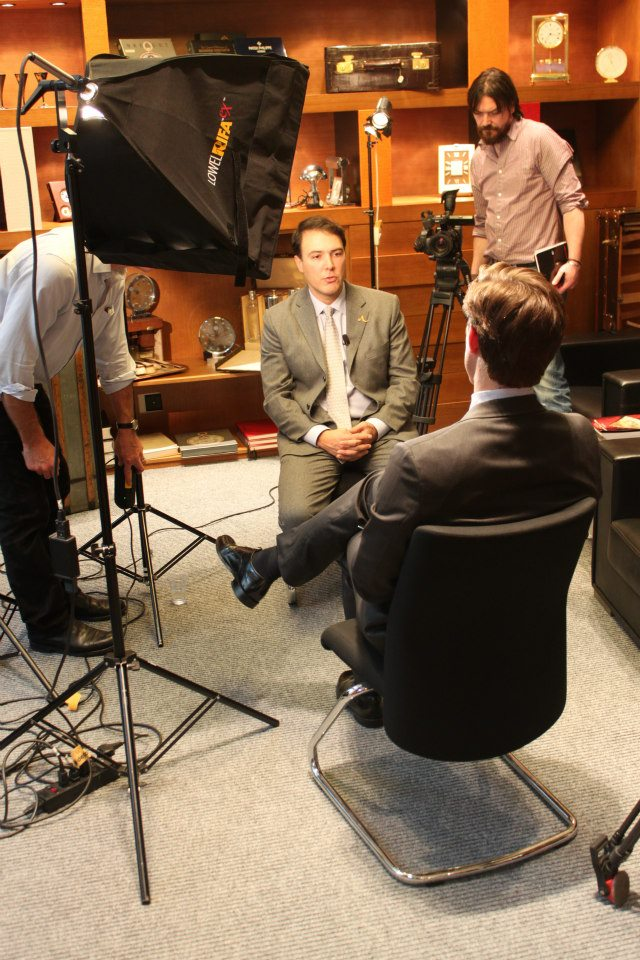
Being interviewed by CBS television

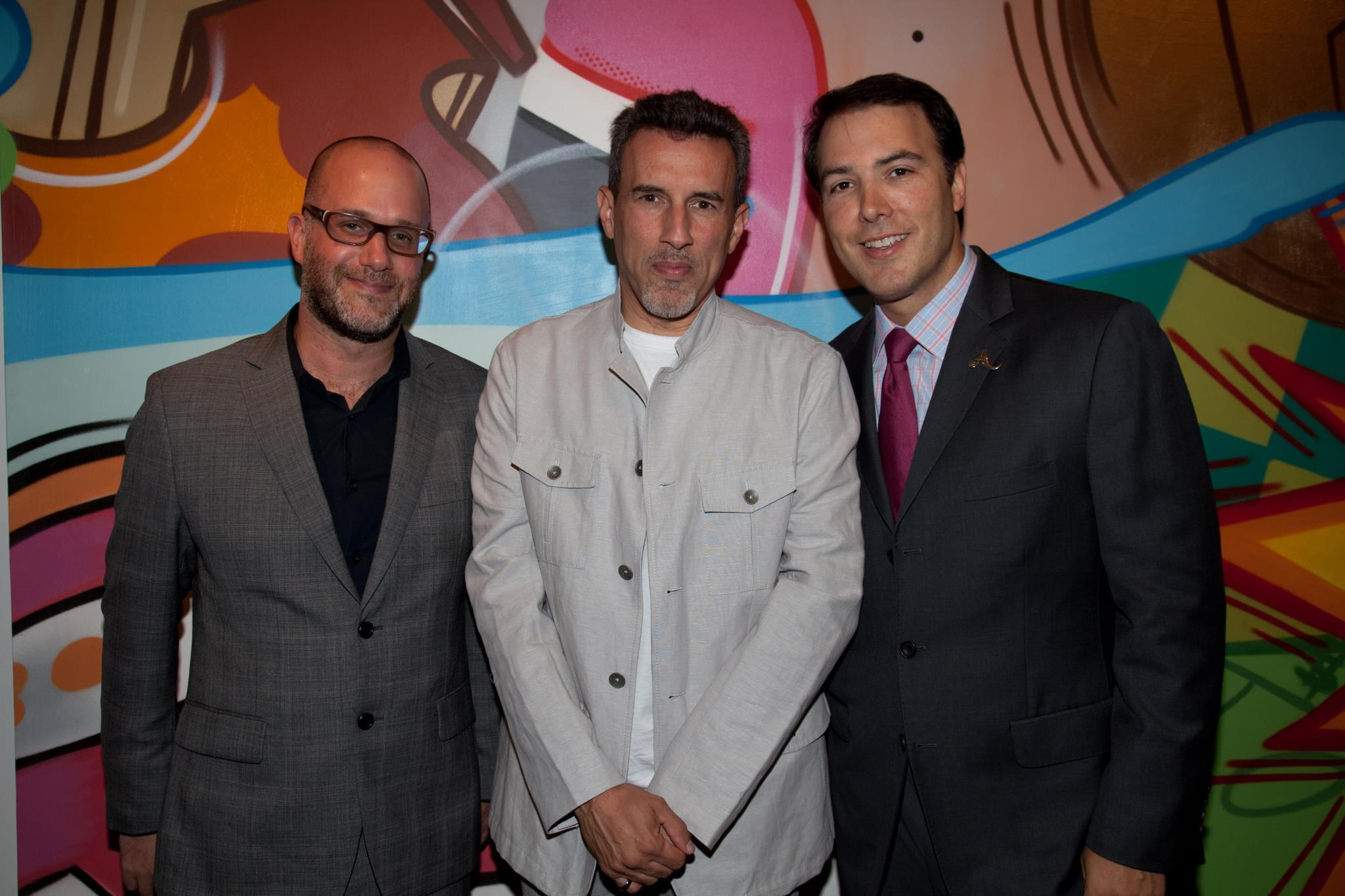
With artist John "Crash" Matos
