= Malkauns (band) =

American psychedelic rock band

- Origin: United States
- Genres: Psychedelic rock, experimental, drone
- Years active: 2009–2011
- Label: Native Plane
- Members: Calvin Laporte, Dylan Simon & Evan Smith

Malkauns was a three-piece ambient-drone-electronic music-psychedelic rock band based in Nashville, Tennessee. They are composed of multi-instrumentalists Calvin Laporte, Dylan Simon and Evan Smith. Malkauns are characterized by their unusual instrumentation and eclectic pop arrangements.

They make extensive use of reel-to-reel audio tape recording, and incorporate techniques of Musique concrète composers, which is not limited to tape splicing and re-sequencing, tape reverse, pitch/speed alteration etc. Their performances have more in common with avant garde happenings from the late 1950s and early 1960s than traditional rock concerts. Their music is heavily influenced by Minimalist music, such as La Monte Young and Terry Riley, and electronic composers, such as Hugh Le Caine and Karlheinz Stockhausen.

== Discography ==
=== Singles ===
- Electric/Sunshine (Native Plane 7"; 2010)
