= Evan Thomas (rugby league) =

Wales international rugby league footballer

Personal information
- Full name: Evan J Thomas
- Born: Wales
- Died: unknown

Playing information
- Position: Forward
Club
Years	Team	Pld	T	G	FG	P
1905–15	Salford	307	24	0	0	72
Representative
Years	Team	Pld	T	G	FG	P
1911–14	Wales	2

Evan Thomas (birth unknown – death unknown) was a Welsh professional rugby league footballer who played in the 1910s. He played at representative level for Wales, and at club level for Salford, as a forward.

== Playing career ==
=== International honours ===
Evan Thomas won 2 caps for Wales in 1911–1914 while at Salford.

=== Championship final appearances ===
During Evan Thomas' time there was Salford's 5–3 victory over Huddersfield in the Championship Final during the 1913–14 season.

=== Challenge Cup Final appearances ===
Evan Thomas played as a forward in Salford's 0–5 defeat by Bradford F.C. in the 1906 Challenge Cup Final during the 1905–06 season at Headingley, Leeds on Saturday 28 April 1906.
