= Evan Crawford =

Evan Crawford may refer to:

- Evan Crawford (baseball) (born 1986), American MLB pitcher
- Evan Crawford (rugby union), New Zealand rugby union player
