= Evan Pettersson =

Swedish footballer

Senior career*
Years	Team	Apps	(Gls)
- Djurgården
- * Club domestic league appearances and goals

Evan Pettersson is a Swedish retired footballer. Pettersson made 40 Allsvenskan appearances for Djurgården and scored 0 goals.
