= Evan Smith =

Evan Smith may refer to:

- Evan Smith (journalist) (born 1966), American journalist, CEO and editor-in-chief of The Texas Tribune
- Evan Smith (American football) (born 1986), American football center
- Evan Smith (playwright), American playwright
- Evan Smith, a member of the band Malkauns
- Evan Smith, a multi-instrumentalist who performs as a live member with Bleachers
