= Evan Michael Tanner =

Evan Michael Tanner, or simply Tanner, is a fictional character created by American author Lawrence Block. A former American soldier who lost the need for sleep after a brain injury, Tanner's adventures take him around the world and he is particularly devoted to "lost causes". Tanner appears in eight novels. Seven of those were published in the five-year period 1966–1970; the eighth appeared in 1998 after a twenty-eight year gap. The often humorous tone of the books is reflected in their titles, such as puns (The Cancelled Czech and The Scoreless Thai) or cultural references (Me Tanner, You Jane).

== Creation and conception ==
Block regards Tanner as an important development in his writing career. Tanner was the author's first successful series character who maintained an audience for several books, paving the way for later successful series with the characters Chip Harrison, Matthew Scudder, and Bernie Rhodenbarr who all debuted in the 1970s. Though Block had published prolifically since the 1950s, he felt the Tanner books were his first truly original creations and not derivative imitations.

The 2023 compilation The Naked and the Deadly: includes two "book bonuses", or condensed previews, of Blocks's Tanner novels which were featured in 1960s 1960's adventure magazines. The reprints collection features "The Great Istanbul Gold Grab", adapted from The Thief Who Couldn't Sleep, published in For Men Only March 1968; and "Bring On the Girls", adapted from The Scoreless Thai, published in Stag April 1968.

== Character overview ==
Tanner is known to have fought in the Korean War when his brain's sleep center was destroyed by a stray piece of shrapnel, making him a permanent insomniac. As a result of his injury, he does not sleep nor does he need to. He was discharged after this incident with a pension of $112 per month (as mentioned in several of the novels) despite becoming an ideal of the "perfect soldier", one who is constantly awake.

Tanner is subject to fatigue after exertion and needs time to recover or regain his strength. When tired, he uses meditation and hatha yoga techniques to relax and enter a semi-trance state. But otherwise he has no need for sleep and suffers no ill effects from not sleeping.

He fills his time productively by reading voraciously, learning multiple languages, and, among other activities, charging stiff fees to write term papers, dissertations, and other documents for college students. He is enamored of lost causes, admiring the dedication to stay committed against overwhelming odds. Tanner is a member of dozens of small groups espousing various fringe causes, such as support for royal pretenders or the restoration of monarchies, political secessionist movements, and the Flat Earth Society (Tanner does not believe in flat earth theories, but rather joined as an expression of his contrarian streak and skepticism). These groups provide a loose network of sympathizers and helpers which Tanner utilizes as he travels the world on adventures. At the end of the first novel, he is recruited to join an American government agency so secretive it does not have a name. Yet Tanner is not a spy or secret agent in the usual sense and is usually not motivated by duty or political ideology. He more typically is motivated by profit, wooing a beautiful woman, or a sense of adventure and curiosity.

== Appearances ==
In The Thief Who Couldn't Sleep (1966), the first book, Tanner takes an avid interest in political causes, primarily the ones existing in the late 1960s when the series first takes place. He is also very good at "coming across money", so when he meets a black-haired woman whose grandmother has fantastic tales of a fortune in European gold hidden under her front porch in a war-torn country, he embarks on a profitable journey. Though only intending to extract five hundred seventy-three pounds of pure gold, he accidentally starts a revolution in Macedonia when his principled support for the rebels' cause is interpreted as a guarantee of American military support. From there, Tanner ends up in a Turkish jail and is hired by a government agency so secret that even the CIA has never heard of them.

In The Canceled Czech (1966), Tanner's new employer may have mistaken him for an informer to one of their dead agents, but that does not stop him from taking over the position and rising to become one of their best agents. As one of their men, he must "cancel" a Czech who was a former Nazi, smuggle twelve female Olympians, one princess, and a defector aboard a Soviet fighter plane to America, end a sexual slavery ring, and rescue a cannibal named Jane from Africa.

In Tanner's Twelve Swingers (1967), during the Cold War, Tanner goes behind the Iron Curtain into Latvia to rescue a friend's girlfriend from communists, but she will not leave without eleven limber teammates, a subversive author, and six-year-old royalty.

In The Scoreless Thai, also known as Two for Tanner (1968), Tanner goes to Thailand to seek a beautiful singer who may also be a jewel thief. Posing as a butterfly hunter, he himself is netted by bandits, makes a deal with a horny young man, gets lost in the malaria-filled jungle, and starts a little war.

In Tanner's Tiger (1968), there are Cold War tensions at the Montreal World's Fair, including a Cuban exhibit, a heap of drugs, Minna, the little girl in line for the Lithuanian throne, the future Queen of England, and a hot woman in a tiger skin.

In Here Comes a Hero also known as Tanner's Virgin (1968), Tanner rescues a woman named Phaedra, who has been abducted by white slavers in the Afghan wilderness. Her honor is at stake, featuring trigger-happy terrorists and a few assassinations.

In Me Tanner, You Jane (1970), Tanner is in Africa where the petty despot of Modonoland has gone missing and taken the state treasury, featuring the CIA, white supremacists, revolutionaries, and a blond jungle bombshell named Sheena.

In Tanner on Ice (1998), while meeting with a double crossing Scandinavian resistance operative, Tanner was incapacitated and cryogenically frozen, though not intended to be brought back. In 1997, his freezing machine was found within a secret chamber of a house being remodeled and repaired with Tanner still inside. Due to new technology, doctors were able to reanimate a perfectly preserved Tanner and he was let loose in then modern day New York City. When he came back home, he found that it was occupied by his adopted daughter, Minna, the rightful heir to the Lithuanian throne, now fully grown. He also finds that he still has a job with his old boss, even though he has been out of it for twenty-five years. His new assignment takes him to former Burma (now called Myanmar) and the deadly Orient, which he has not seen since the events of The Scoreless Thai. To make things even more complicated, he has to bring back an exiled Russian beauty, overcome malaria, and get used to the new world.
