= Evan Lyon =

Evan Lyon (born August 14, 1971) is the Illinois Director for Partners In Health's Public Health Accompaniment Unit. He served as the Chief Integrative Health Officer for the Heartland Alliance Health - a Chicago-based NGO serving people experiencing homelessness, mental illness, addiction, and chronic illness - from 2016 to 2020.

Previously, Lyon was an assistant professor of medicine at the University of Chicago Pritzker School of Medicine. Since the late 1990s, he has worked extensively in Haiti with Partners In Health and the Department of Global Health Equity at the Harvard Medical School.
