= Evan Sayet =

American comedian and conservative speaker

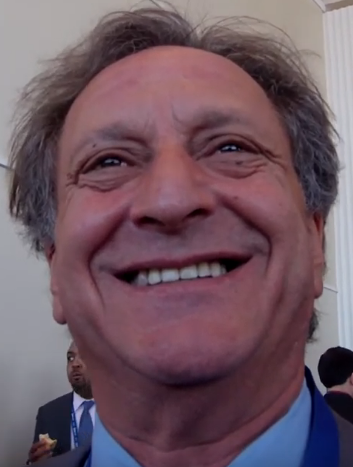
- Sayet at CPAC in 2017
- Born: October 29, 1960 (age 64)
- Occupation(s): Satirist, Speaker, Conservative Humorist
- Years active: 1980s – present
- Website: www.evansayet.com

Evan Douglas Sayet (born October 29, 1960) is a comedian and conservative speaker.

Sayet is the author of The KinderGarden Of Eden: How The Modern Liberal Thinks And Why He's Convinced That Ignorance Is Bliss. ISBN 1480010421

== Life and career ==
Evan was raised in a Jewish family. He is the creator and star of "The Right To Laugh – a night of Conservative Comedy," which is a conservative comedy show in America. Evan attended the University of Rochester where he majored in Political Science and English Literature. He moved to Hollywood to be in the entertainment industry and has spent over twenty-five years writing television shows, screenplays, documentaries and more before segueing into the field of political commentary.
