= Evan Esar =

American humorist

Evan Esar (1899–1995) was an American humorist who wrote Esar's Comic Dictionary in 1943, Humorous English in 1961, and 20,000 Quips and Quotes in 1968.

He is known for quotes like "Statistics — the only science that enables different experts using the same figures to draw different conclusions." He also wrote The Legend of Joe Miller, which was privately printed for members of the Roxburghe Club of San Francisco by the Grabhorn Press in 1957.

His quotes are commonly found in crossword puzzles.
