= Evan William Evans =

Welsh-American mathematician

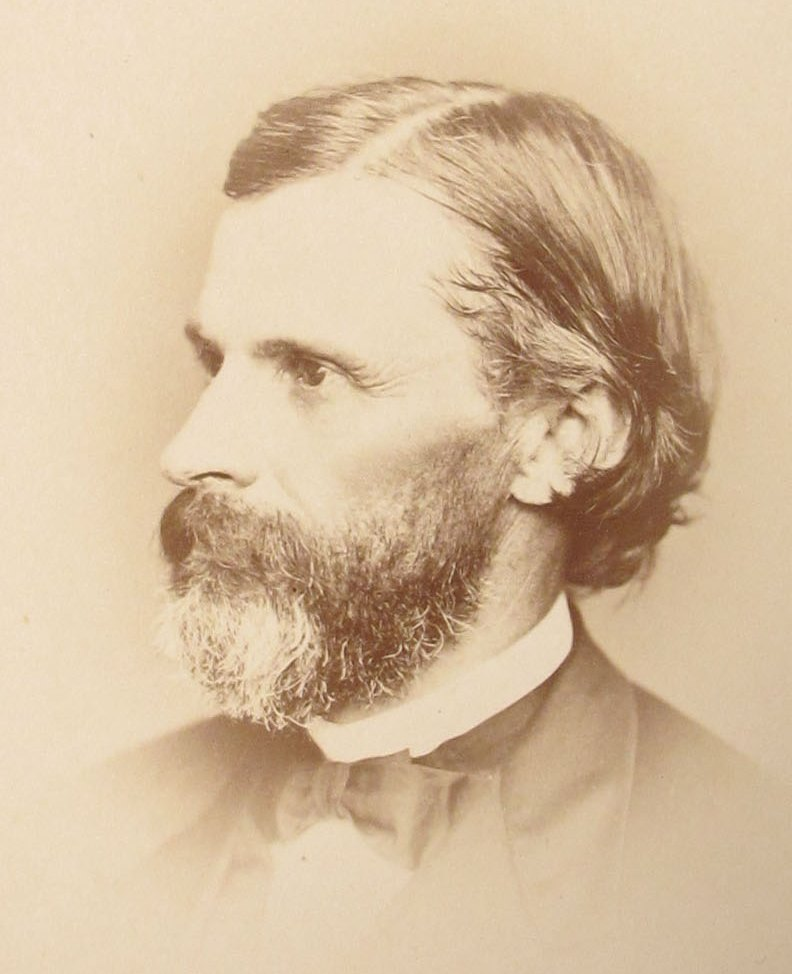
Evan William Evans

Evan William Evans (January 6, 1827 – May 22, 1874) was a Welsh-American mathematician and the first professor at Cornell University.

Evans, son of William and Catharine (Howell), was born Jan. 6, 1827 in Llangyfelach, near Swansea, South Wales. His parents moved to Bradford County, Pa., in 1831, where he obtained his early education. He graduated from Yale College in 1851. He studied theology at New Haven for about a year, and then became principal of the Delaware Literary Institute, in Franklin, N. Y. From this position he was called to a tutorship at Yale, which he resigned, however, after one year's service (1855–6). In 1857 he was appointed Professor of Natural Philosophy and Astronomy at Marietta College, Ohio, and filled that place until 1864. He was then for three years occupied in Mining Engineering, and spent a fourth year in European travel. He was the first professor appointed in Cornell University, N. Y., and from the opening of that institution, in the fall of 1868, until 1872, filled the chair of Mathematics. He resigned on account of failing health, and after an absence of a few months at the South, returned to Ithaca, and gradually sank, until his death of consumption, May 22, 1874. Professor Evans was a general scholar, and while excelling in mathematics, was perhaps the most thorough Celtic student in this country.

He was married, Aug. 6, 1856, to Helen E., daughter of Rev. Dr. Tertius S Clarke, then of Franklin, N. Y. She survived him, with several children.

This article incorporates public domain material from the Yale Obituary Record.
