= Evan A. Baker =

American opera historian

Evan Baker
- Born: 1952 (age 73–74)
- Education: PhD New York University
- Occupation: Opera historian
- Writing career
- Subject: Opera History
- Notable work: Alfred Roller's production of Mozart's Don Giovanni

Evan Baker (born 1952) is an American opera historian.

== Life and career ==
Baker received his PhD in Performance Studies from New York University in 1993.

He has published numerous scholarly studies on a range of topics in opera staging and production.

== Selected bibliography ==
- (1990) The scene designs for the first performances of Bizet's Carmen
- (1992) Theaters in Vienna during Mozart's lifetime
- (1993) Alfred Roller's production of Mozart's Don Giovanni: a break in the scenic traditions of the Vienna Court Opera
- (1994) Das Archiv Alfred Roller
- (1998) Wagner in rehearsal, 1875–1876: the diaries of Richard Fricke by Richard Fricke and E. B.
- (1998) Leoncavallo in the United States and Canada in fall, 1906
- (1998) Nazionalismo e cosmopolitismo nell'opera fra '800 e '900: atti del 3o Convegno internazionale "Ruggero Leoncavallo nel suo tempo": Locarno, Biblioteca cantonale, 6-7 ottobre 1995 by Convegno internazionale di studi su Ruggero Leoncavallo
- (2001) Arnold Schönberg als Regisseur?: "Erwartung" und "Die glückliche Hand" an der Krolloper
- (2013) From the Score to the Stage: An Illustrated History of Continental Opera Production and Staging (Chicago 2013)
