= Evan Lloyd =

Evan Lloyd may refer to:

- Evan Lloyd (poet) (c. 1734–1776), Welsh poet
- Evan Lloyd (MP) (died 1587), MP for Denbighshire
- Evan Lloyd (rugby union, born 1871) (1871–1951), Welsh international rugby union wing
- Evan Lloyd (rugby union, born 2000), Welsh rugby union fly-half
- Evan Lloyd (rugby union, born 2001), Welsh rugby union hooker
- Evan Lloyd Vaughan (c. 1709–1791), Welsh politician
- Sir Evan Lloyd, 1st Baronet (c. 1622–1663) of the Lloyd baronets
- Sir Evan Lloyd, 2nd Baronet (c. 1654–1700) of the Lloyd baronets
