= Evan Elken =

American cyclist

Personal information
- Born: February 19, 1977 (age 49) United States

Cycling career
- Sport: Cycling
- Current team: Retired
- Discipline: Road
- Role: Rider

Professional teams
- 2004-2008: Jittery Joe's
- 2009: Land Rover-Orbea

Evan Elken (born February 19, 1977) is a former American cyclist.

== Palmares ==
2008
1st stage 4b Tour de Beauce
