= Evan Arnold (cricketer) =

Australian cricketer

Personal information
- Full name: Evan Matthew Campbell Arnold
- Born: 20 August 1974 (age 52); North Adelaide, South Australia
- Batting: Right-handed
- Bowling: Right-hand legbreak googly

Domestic team information
- Years: Team
- 1994/95: Australian Cricket Academy
- 1998/99: South Australia

Career statistics
Competition	First-class
Matches	2
Runs scored	34
Batting average	17.00
100s/50s	0/0
Top score	28
Balls bowled	306
Wickets	2
Bowling average	94.00
5 wickets in innings	0
10 wickets in match	0
Best bowling	1/32
Catches/stumpings	2/–
- Source: ESPNcricinfo, 6 February 2021

Evan Arnold (born 20 August 1974) is a former Australian cricketer and amateur Australian rules footballer. He played two first-class cricket matches, including one for South Australia.

As a junior cricketer, Arnold played two four-day matches for Prince Alfred College against St Peter's College, the first in 1990 and the second in 1991. In the 1991 match he took fourteen wickets across St. Peter's College's two innings in a seven-wicket victory. He also played one match for South Australia's under-19 representative side and several matches for their second XI side. Arnold made his debut for the Sturt District Cricket Club in 1993 as the 485th player to play for the club at the top level of South Australian Grade Cricket. In 1995, he was part of the Australian Cricket Academy, going on tours of Pakistan and New Zealand. On the tour of New Zealand, Arnold made his first-class debut in a four-day game against the New Zealand academy. Arnold later played his only first-class match for South Australia in a match against the touring English cricket team at Adelaide Oval in November 1998.

Arnold also played amateur Australian rules football in the South Australian Amateur Football League for the Adelaide University Football Club, with whom he won a premiership in 1999 and played in two further grand finals. He later played for the Hummocks Watchman Eagles in the Adelaide Plains Football League, winning two premierships with the club.

Arnold studied a Bachelor of Commerce degree at the University of Adelaide, and began a career in business working for Lion Nathan and Fosters. In November 2009, he began working for the Port Adelaide Football Club as their Manager of Corporate Partners and Capability. In 2012 he became the Chief Executive of the South Adelaide Football Club, but he resigned from this position at the end of 2014 as part of a management restructuring at the club.
