= Evan Roberts =

Evan Roberts may refer to:

- Evan Roberts (botanist) (1909–1991), botanist, conservationist and mountain man
- Evan Roberts (minister) (1878–1951), figure in the 1904–1905 Welsh Revival
- Evan Roberts (sportscaster) (born 1983), American sports radio personality
- Evan Roberts (rugby union) (1861–1927), Wales rugby player
