= Evan Golden =

Evan Golden may refer to:

- Evan Golden (actor), American TV personality, actor, and producer
- Evan Golden (wrestler) (born 2000), American professional wrestler
