= Evan Price =

British politician

Evan David Lewis Price is a barrister at Ten Old Square chambers, Lincoln's Inn in London and a Conservative politician.

== Background ==
Born and raised in Wales, Price attended Sandhurst and joined the Royal Regiment of Wales, serving in Germany, Hong Kong and Northern Ireland as well as England and Wales. After seven years in the army, he left in 1993 and went to university. He qualified as a barrister and was called to the bar in 1997, specialising in property, insolvency and commercial litigation, and also advises on constitutional and administrative matters.

== Political career ==
Price's grandfather was the first minister of state for Welsh affairs, who was also appointed a member of the European Assembly (the forerunner to the Parliament).

Price has campaigned in elections all over the country, in Brecon & Radnor and Blaenau Gwent as well as Sedgefield and London. He has advised the Conservative Party on a number of issues, as part of a committee of lawyers about constitutional reforms, and as an individual about the effects and possible effects of policy ideas on the law and the law on policy ideas.

On 28 March 2008, it was announced that he had been placed second on the Welsh Conservatives' list of candidates for the European Parliamentary elections in 2009. This caused some controversy as he had used an address in London for his nomination papers and used this address as this is the location of his principal residence. He emphasised that he is also registered to vote in Wales.
