= Evan Cooper (disambiguation) =

Evan Cooper may refer to:

- Evan Cooper, former football player
- Evan Cooper (Shortland Street), a fictional character on the New Zealand soap opera Shortland Street
- Evan Cooper, founder of the Life Extension Society
