= Evan Gordon =

South African cricketer (born 1960)

Personal information
- Born: 26 September 1960 (age 64); Cape Town, South Africa
- Source: ESPNcricinfo, 30 December 2016

Evan Gordon (born 26 September 1960) is a South African cricketer. He played twenty first-class matches for Western Province and New South Wales between 1978/79 and 1983/84.

== See also ==
- List of New South Wales representative cricketers
