= Evan Williams =

Evan Williams may refer to:

== People ==
=== In sport ===
- Evan O. Williams (1889–1946), American football and basketball coach
- Evan Williams (footballer) (1943–2025), Scottish football goalkeeper
- Evan Williams (jockey) (1912–2001), horse racing jockey and trainer
- Evan Williams (rugby) (1906–1976), rugby union and rugby league footballer of the 1920s
- Evan Williams (safety) (born 2001), American football player

=== Other ===
- Evan James Williams (1903–1945), Welsh physicist
- Evan Williams (actor) (born 1985), Canadian actor and musician
- Evan Williams (diplomat) (born 1950), Australian diplomat and Administrator of the Australian Indian Ocean Territories
- Evan Williams (Internet entrepreneur) (born 1972), businessman, blogger and Twitter co-founder
- Evan Williams (tenor) (1867–1918), American singer
- Sir Evan Williams, 1st Baronet (1871–1959), Welsh industrialist
- Owen Williams (engineer) (Evan Owen Williams, 1890–1969), British engineer and architect

== Other ==
- Evan Williams (bourbon), brand of bourbon whiskey
