= Evan Walker =

Evan Walker is the name of:

- Evan Harris Walker (1935–2006), American physicist
- Evan Walker (politician) (1935–2015), Australian politician
