= Evan Brandt =

American journalist

Evan Brandt is a reporter covering Pottstown, Pennsylvania, for The Mercury. Brandt has received media coverage for being the newspaper's last reporter located in Pottstown.

== Personal life ==
Brandt graduated from Pleasantville High School in 1982. After graduating SUNY Binghamton in 1986, he worked at The Patent Trader weekly newspaper in Northern Westchester, NY, leaving in 1997 as Executive Editor of Trader Publications. Brandt started working at The Mercury in 1997.

Brandt is the biological son of writer Anthony S. Brandt and Barbara Brandt, and the stepson of Lorraine Dusky. His stepmother was previously a newspaper reporter.

Brandt is married to Karen Maxfield and has one son.

== Selected works ==
According to The New York Times, Brandt has received 36 journalism awards.

In the early 2000s, Brandt exposed a chemical company's warehouse which closed and became part of Montgomery County Community College.

Brandt's coverage of the proposed Pottstown YMCA closure helped keep it open.

His coverage of the shortage of computers for disadvantaged students prompted a $60,000 donation.
