= Evan Rees (Australian footballer) =

Australian rules footballer

Personal information
- Full name: Evans Douglas Rees
- Born: 6 August 1923; Telangatuk East, Victoria
- Died: 5 November 2004 (aged 81); Glen Iris, Victoria
- Original team: Telangatuk
- Height: 183 cm (6 ft 0 in)
- Weight: 83 kg (183 lb)
- Position: Defence

Playing career^{1}
Years	Club	Games (Goals)
1946–50	Footscray	80 (2)
- ^{1} Playing statistics correct to the end of 1950.

Evans Douglas Rees (6 August 1923 – 5 November 2004) was an Australian rules footballer who played with Footscray in the Victorian Football League (VFL). Originally from Horsham, he spent a season with South Sydney before coming to Footscray.

Rees served in the Australian Army during World War II prior to playing with Footscray.
