= Ryan Sullivan (cyclist) =

Australian cyclist (born 1984)

Personal information
- Full name: Ryan Sullivan
- Born: 28 November 1984 (age 41) Evandale, Tasmania, Australia
- Height: 6 ft 1 in (1.85 m)
- Weight: 150 lb (68 kg)

Cycling career
- Sport: Cycling
- Current team: Ion Sports Nutrition P/B United Health Care
- Discipline: Road
- Role: Rider

Professional teams
- 2002/2005: Australian Institute of Sport
- 2006: UVCA Troyes
- 2007: G.S. Bibanese
- 2008: Jittery Joe's
- 2009/2010: Ion Sports Nutrition P/B United Health Care

Ryan Sullivan (born 28 November 1984) is an Australian professional racing cyclist, currently riding for Ion Sports Nutrition P/B United Health Care. Sullivan started his career with the Australian Institute of Sport before competing in France with UVCA Troyes and in Italy with G.S. Bibanese. In 2008 Sullivan signed for American team Jittery Joe's. He currently attends Cumberland University on a cycling scholarship.

== Career highlights ==
2007
4th Terano (Italy)
5th Bolzano Time Trial (Italy)
11th Colle Umberto (Italy)
17th Piccola San Remo (Italy)
19th Stage 2, Porec Spring Trophy (Croatia)
32nd General Classification, Porec Spring Trophy (Croatia)

2006
4th Prato Valle (Italy)
4th GP Este (Italy)
4th Stage 2, Tour of Tasmania (Australia)
6th Monte Granero (Italy)
7th Orciano (Italy)
7th Stage 6, Tour of Tasmania (Australia)
10th San Dona di Piave (Italy)
10th Ponton (Italy)
11th Poggiana (Italy)
13th General Classification, Tour of Tasmania (Australia)
17th Recioto (Italy)
17th GP Atila (Italy)
22nd GP Kranj (Slovenia)
24th General Classification Giro Fruili (Italy)

2005
3rd Prix de Cramont (France)
4th Paris – Vierzon (France)
4th GP Valleiries (France)
4th Romain S. Meause (France)
6th Coucy-le-Château (France)
8th GP de Tourteron (France)
8th Tour Communes Yonne Nord (France)
9th Auxerre Dijon (France)
10th Stage 1, Ronde de l’Oise (France)
23rd General Classification, Tour de Franche-Comté (France)
66th General Classification, Herald Sun Tour (Australia)

2004
4th Paris- Vierzon

2003
2nd Australian Under 23 Club Road Championship
2nd Tour of Tasmania, Tattersalls Cup
4th Oceania Under 23 Road Championship
