= Timothy Oulton =

British furniture designer (1967–2022)

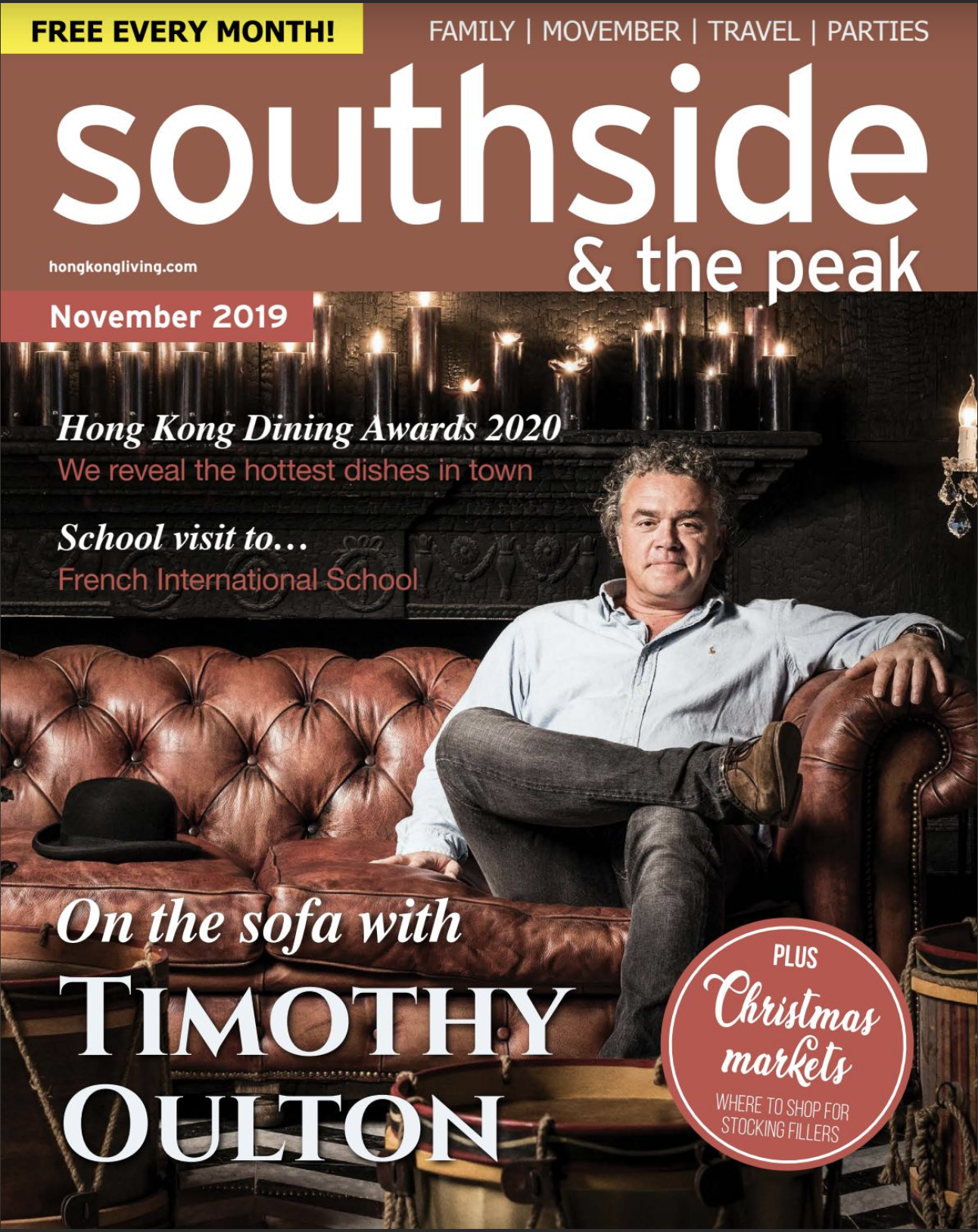
Timothy Oulton, British Furniture Designer on cover of Southside Magazine 2019

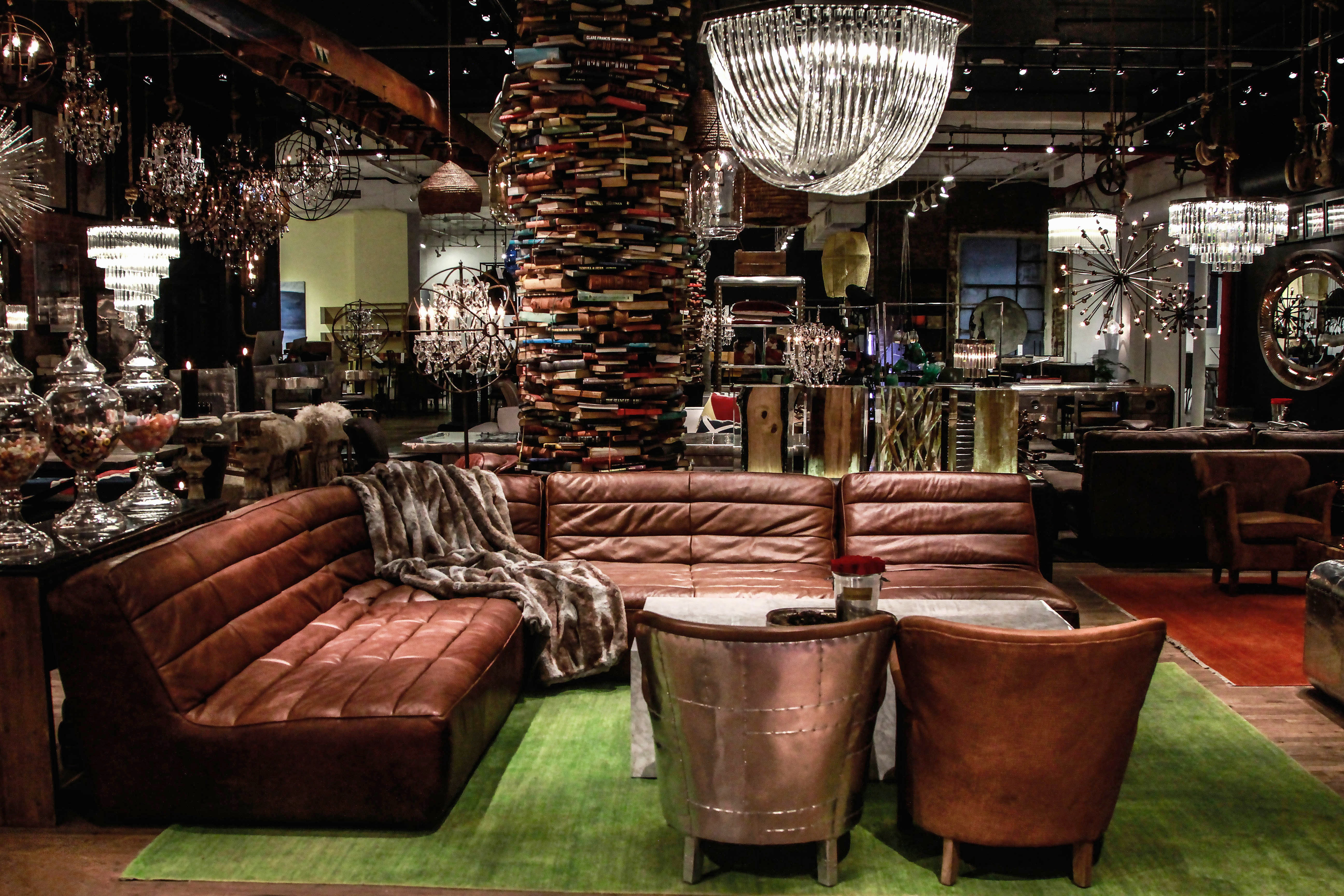
Timothy Oulton sofas at ABC Carpet and Home in New York

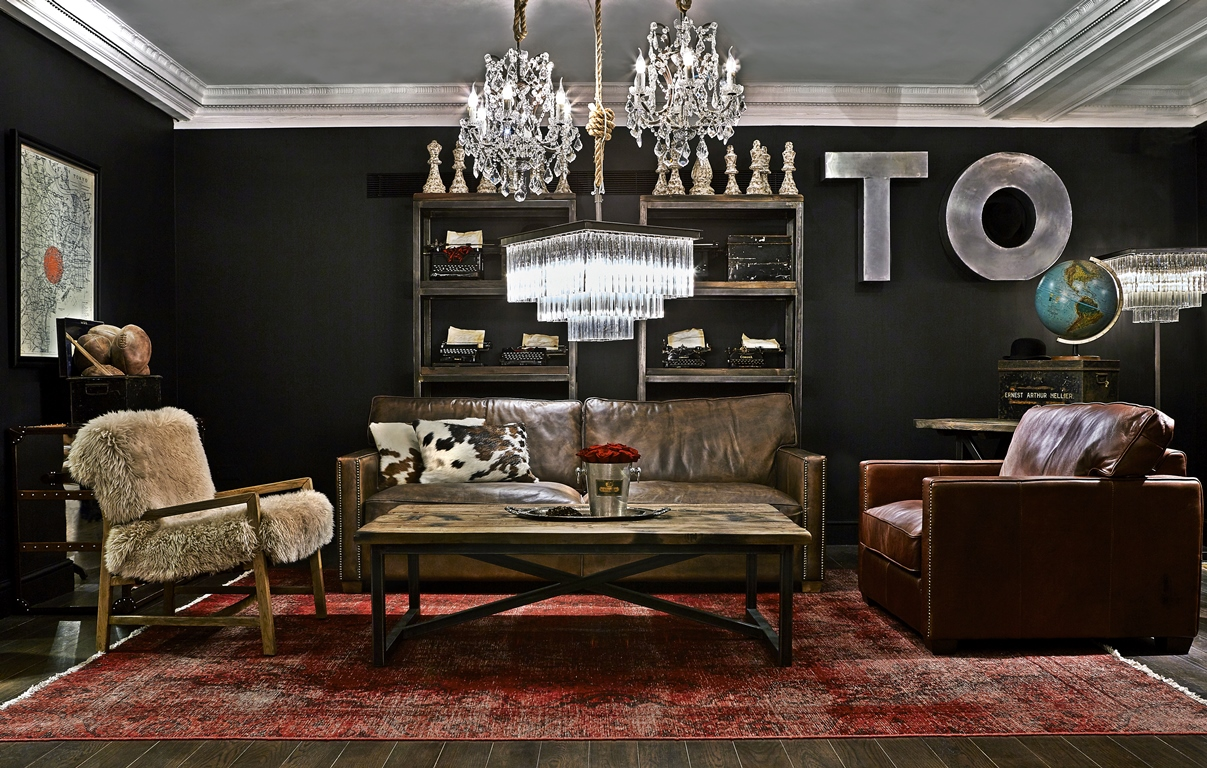
Timothy Oulton designs in Harrods, London

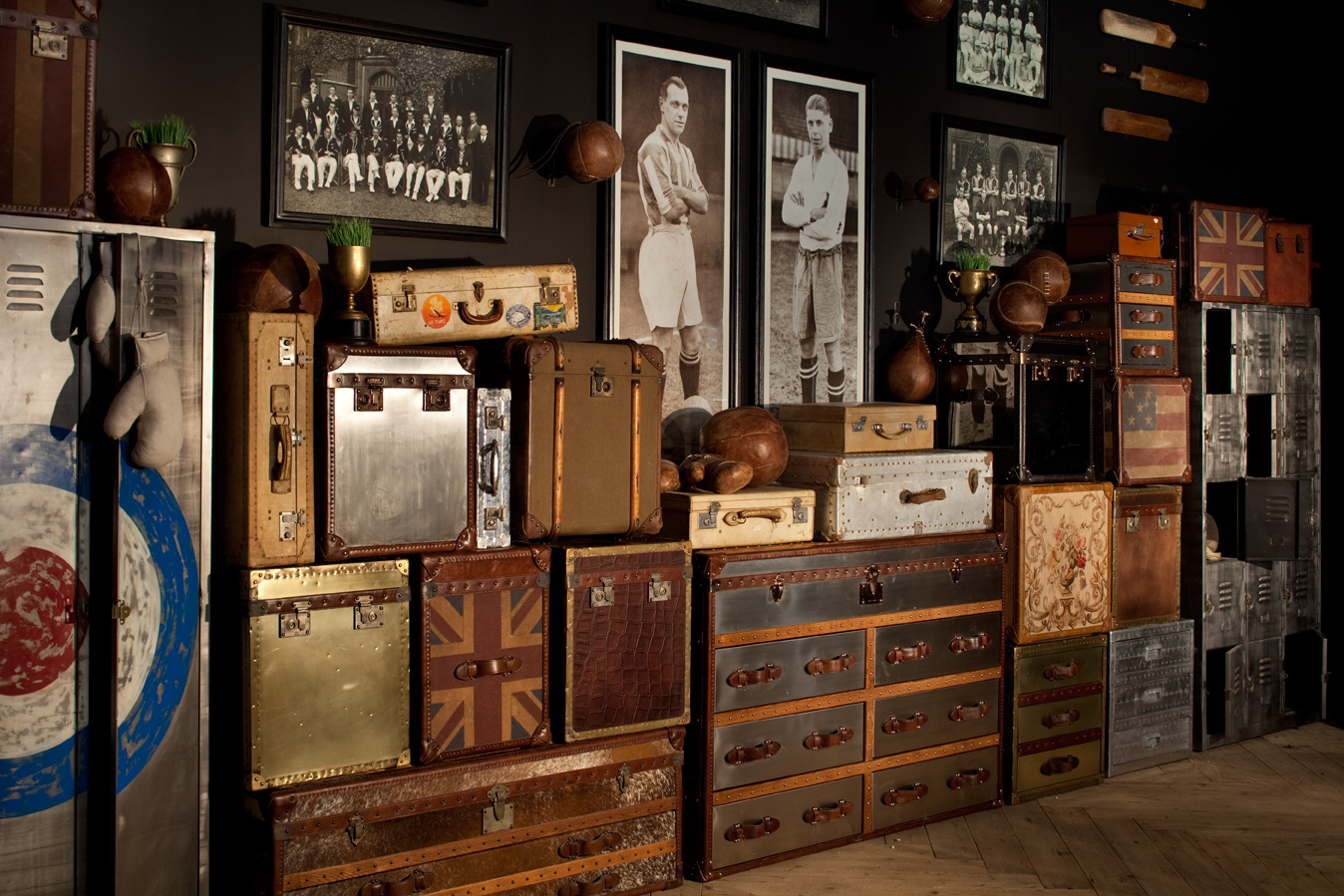
Trunks designed by Timothy Oulton

Timothy Oulton (1967 – 3 March 2022) was a British luxury furniture designer born in Manchester whose modern British style has become globally popular. He was founder and creative director of the furniture brand Timothy Oulton which, as of June 2022, has 55 retail galleries worldwide.

Oulton's designs are also retailed through Restoration Hardware in the U.S.

His style blended modern and vintage British aesthetics, with an emphasis on high-quality, recycled and reclaimed materials.

== History ==
Timothy Oulton was born in 1967 near Manchester England. Oulton's father, Philip Oulton, a former Major in the British Army opened a small antiques shop in the village of Hale, close to Manchester, when Oulton was nine years old. The business was named Halo Antiques, after the original sign "Hale Antique" was misprinted.

From the age of seven to thirteen, Oulton attended the boarding school St Bede's School in Staffordshire, before successfully attaining his Common Entrance exam and attending boarding school at Ampleforth College at the age of thirteen. Ampleforth Abbey and College is an old Benedictine run school in the North of England, which would later inspire Oulton's signature classic English style. Oulton began working for the family business when he left school at 18, and it was here that his passion for furniture and design blossomed.

After years of selling restored homeware items and growing the business with his brother, Charles, Timothy Oulton officially took the helm at Halo. He decided that there was no long-term future in the antiques business, and repositioned the company to focus on the recreation of antique pieces with a modern viewpoint.

In 2004, Oulton established the global division of Halo Group in Hong Kong.

Timothy Oulton died on 3 March 2022. Following his death, Halo Group CFO James Dilley took over as CEO of the Timothy Oulton furniture brand and as CEO of the Halo Group and continues to guide its global expansion.
