= Evan Griffiths =

Evan Griffiths (18 January 1795 – 31 August 1873) was a Welsh clergyman, born near Bridgend, Glamorgan. He translated various mostly theological works into Welsh and published a Welsh-English dictionary in 1847.

== Life ==
A Welsh independent minister, Griffiths was at Gellibeblig, near Bridgend, Glamorganshire, the youngest of seven children. He was only three years old when his father died, leaving his family in poverty. His mother taught him at home.

Griffiths became a member of the neighbouring independent church when he was thirteen, and at twenty-one was encouraged to preach. About this time he went for a year to a school kept by his own minister, and then to a college at Newport, Monmouthshire, kept by Dr. Jenkin Lewis. At the end of two years his tutor recommended him to Lady Barham as a suitable person to undertake the pastorate of two small churches in Gower. After there successfully for two years he was ordained, 21 July 1824.

In August 1828 Griffiths moved to Swansea to undertake a Welsh translation of Matthew Henry's Commentary. Only a few numbers of the work appeared before the printer became bankrupt. Griffiths purchased the business and carried on as translator and printer till the work was finished. He also preached almost every Sunday.

Griffiths died 31 August 1873.

== Works ==
Altogether Griffiths published more than forty works, original or translated, including a Welsh-English Dictionary. Abertavy, 1847. Besides Henry's Commentary, he translated Charles Grandison Finney's Lectures (1839) and Sermons (1841), Samuel Burder's Oriental Customs, Thomas Brooks's Mute Christian, John Angell James's Church Member's Guide, Philip Doddridge's Rise and Progress, and other books.
