= Evan Malbone Johnson =

American clergyman

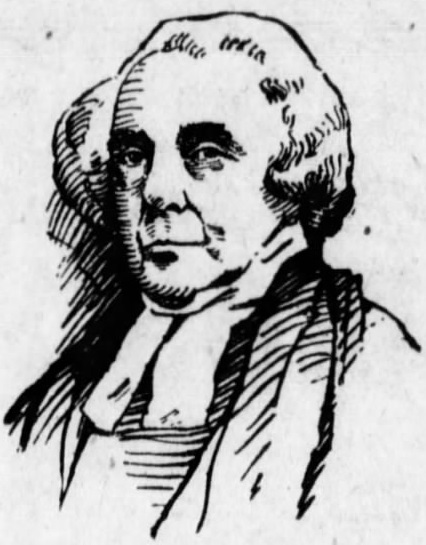
The Brooklyn Daily Eagle, October 26, 1926

Evan Malbone Johnson (June 6, 1791 - March 19, 1865) was a clergyman of the Episcopal Church in the United States of America. Born in Bristol, Rhode Island, he was ordained to the deaconate and priesthood by Bishop Alexander Viets Griswold. Often referred to as "Dominie" Johnson, he built Saint John's Church at 139 St Johns Place, Park Slope, Brooklyn, New York in 1826, and served that parish for 21 years as its rector without pay. Saint John's Church was consecrated on July 10, 1827, by Bishop John Henry Hobart.

In 1847 Johnson established Saint Michael's Church, also in Brooklyn. He served that parish until his death. He was a prolific writer in the cautious pre-ritualist High Church school of Anglicanism. Johnson baptized William Edmond Armitage, later second Bishop of Wisconsin (1870-1873).

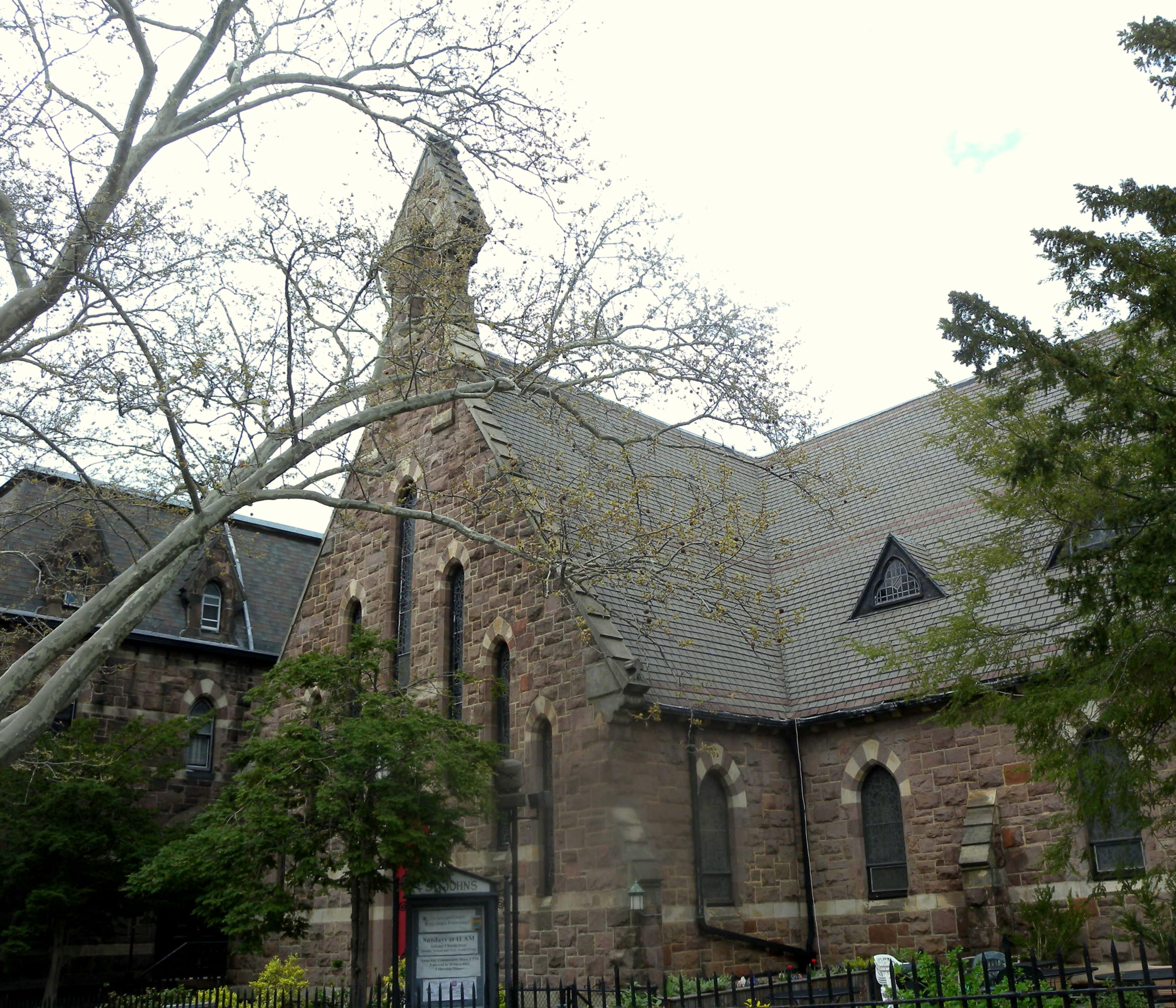
St John's, Park Slope

Johnson was the American editor of the influential A History of the Protestant Episcopal Church in America, by Samuel Wilberforce, Bishop of Oxford.

Johnson's grandson Evan M. Johnson (1861-1923) was a career officer in the United States Army who attained the rank of brigadier general.
