= Coale =

Coale is a surname. Notable people with the surname include:

- Ansley J. Coale (1917–2002), American demographer
- Danny Coale (born 1988), American football player
- Griffith Baily Coale (1890–1950), American painter
- James M. Coale (died 1882), American politician from Maryland
- John Coale (born 1946), American lawyer
- Robert Dorsey Coale (1857–1915), American colonel and scientist
- Sherri Coale (born 1965), American women's basketball coach

== See also ==
- Coal
- Coales (surname)
- Cole (disambiguation)
