= Coles (surname) =

- Language: English

Origin
- Language: English
- Meaning: Pet form of Nicholas "coal black"

Other names
- Variant forms: Cole, Colles

Coles is a patronymic surname of English origins deriving from either a pet form of the name Nicholas or from the Old English word meaning '"coal black".

Notable people with the surname include:

- Arthur William Coles (1892–1982), Australian businessman
- Vernell Eufaye "Bimbo" Coles (b. 1968), American basketball player
- Bryony Jean Coles (b. 1946), British prehistoric archaeologist
- Cameron Coles (b. 1974), Australian-born Scottish cricketer
- Cecil Frederick Coles (1888–1918), British composer
- Charles "Honi" Coles (1911–1992), American tap dancer
- Charlie Coles (1942–2013), American basketball player and coach
- Charlotte Coles, British oncologist and professor
- Cowper Phipps Coles (1819–1870), British naval captain and designer
- Cyril Henry Coles (1899–1959), British writer, 50% of Manning Coles
- Daniel J Coles (b. 1965), American Educator, Superintendent of Schools
- Dane Coles (b. 1986), New Zealand rugby player
- Daniel Richard Coles (b. 1981), English footballer
- Darnell Coles (b. 1962), American baseball player and coach
- Dennis Coles (b. 1970), Ghostface Killah of the Wu-Tang Clan
- Edward Coles (1786–1868), American abolitionist and politician
- Elisha Coles (lexicographer) (1640–1680), English lexicographer
- Elizabeth Coles (1912–1975), British novelist Elizabeth Taylor
- Fenton George Coles (b. 1937), Welsh rugby player
- George Coles (cricketer, born 1798) (1798–1865), English amateur cricketer
- George Coles (politician) (1810–1875), Canadian politician; first Premier of Prince Edward Island
- George Edward Coles (1851–1903), English cricketer
- George Coles (architect) (1884–1963), English architect
- Sir George James "G.J." Coles (1885–1977), founder of what was to become the Coles Group shopping empire, Australia
- H. Brent Coles (b. 1951), mayor of Boyse, Idaho
- Isaac Coles (1747–1813), American politician
- Kimberly Coles (b. 1962), American actress
- Joanne Coles (b. 1992), English motorcycle trials rider
- John Coles (1833–1919), English businessman
- John Coles (archaeologist) (1930–2020), archaeologist
- John David Coles, American TV and film director
- Leslie Stephen Coles (1941–2014), American biogerontologist and a key member of the Supercentenarian Research Foundation
- Laveranues Coles (b. 1977), American football player
- Lisa Coles (b. 1964), American broadcaster Lisa Guerrero
- Manning Coles, pseudonym of British spy writers Adelaide Manning (1891–1955) and Cyril Coles (1899–1965)
- Mark Coles, New Zealand cricket coach
- Megan Gail Coles, Canadian writer
- Miriam Coles Harris (1834–1925), author whose anonymous first novel attracted several impostors
- Nathaniel Adams Coles (1919–1965), American jazz musician Nat King Cole
- Neil Chapman Coles (b. 1934), British golfer
- Peter Coles (b. 1963), Professor of Astrophysics at Cardiff University
- Ray Coles, mayor and committee member Lakewood, New Jersey
- Richard Coles (b. 1962), British musician and clergyman
- Richard Coles (civil servant) (1862–1935), British civil servant
- Robert Coles (settler) (c. 1600–1655), early settler in New England
- Robert Coles (psychiatrist) (1928–2026), American author, child psychiatrist and academic
- Robert Coles (golfer) (born 1972), English golfer
- Robert T. Coles (1929–2020), African-American architect, educator, and social justice activist
- Walter Coles (1790–1857), U.S. Representative from Virginia
- William Coles Finch (1864–1944), English author and historian
- Wayne Coles-Janess, Australian writer, film director and producer

== See also ==
- Coles (disambiguation)
- Sadie Coles HQ, gallery
- Cole (surname)
