= Coles (given name) =

Coles is a given name and may refer to:

- Coles Bashford (1816–1878), American lawyer and politician, fifth Governor of Wisconsin
- Coles Phillips (1880–1927), American artist and illustrator
- Coles Trapnell (1910–1999), American television producer, writer, and director
- Coles Whalen, Americana, pop and country singer-songwriter based in Denver

== See also ==
- Coles (disambiguation)
- Coles (surname)
