= Eddie Pollock =

Scottish cricketer

Personal information
- Full name: Edward Thomas Niels Pollock
- Born: 1 June 1957 (age 69); Stirling, Stirlingshire, Scotland
- Batting: Right-handed

Domestic team information
- Years: Team
- 1983: Scotland

Career statistics
Competition	List A
Matches	1
Runs scored	6
Batting average	6.00
100s/50s	–/–
Top score	6
Catches/stumpings	1/–
- Source: Cricinfo, 15 June 2022

Edward 'Eddie' Thomas Niels Pollock (born 1 June 1957) is a Scottish former cricketer and educator.

Pollock was born at Stirling in June 1957 and was educated in the town at St Modan's High School. A club cricketer for Stenhousemuir Cricket Club, Pollock made a single appearance for Scotland in a List A one-day match against Northamptonshire at Northampton in the 1983 Benson & Hedges Cup. He was dismissed for 6 runs in the match by Tim Lamb. By profession, Pollock was a physical education teacher at Dollar Academy.
