= Coles =

Coles may refer to:

== Businesses ==
- Coles Supermarkets, a supermarket chain in Australia
- Coles Group, parent company of Coles Supermarkets, Coles Online, Coles Local, Coles Liquor and flybuys
- Coles (bookstore), a bookstore chain in Canada, a division of Indigo Books and Music

== Places ==
- Coles, Illinois, Coles County, Illinois, United States
- Coles, Mississippi, Amite County, Mississippi, United States
- Coles, Ourense, Galicia, Spain
- Coles, South Australia, Australia
- Coles Bay, Tasmania, Australia
- Electoral district of Coles in South Australia, renamed to Morialta in the 1998 electoral redistribution
- Coles County, Illinois

== Other uses ==
- Coles 4038, ribbon microphone produced by Coles Electroacoustics
- Coles (surname)
- Coles (given name)

== See also ==
- Coales (surname)
