= St Modan's High School =

Location
- Royal Stuart Way, Forthbank; Stirling, FK7 7WS; Scotland

Information
- Type: S1 - S6
- Motto: Sapientia Et Gratia (In wisdom and Grace)
- Established: 1933
- Head teacher: Claire Friel
- Gender: Coeducational
- Enrollment: 917
- Houses: Rosneath, Kilmodan, Ardchattan
- Colours: Maroon and Yellow
- Feeder schools: Denny, Alloa, Tullibody, Cowie and Stirling
- Website: stmodans.co.uk

St Modan's Roman Catholic High School is an S1-S6 Catholic high school in Stirling, Scotland.

== History ==
In September 1933, St Modan's High School was officially opened by Archbishop McDonald of St Andrew's and Edinburgh. It was located in Barnsdale Road, St Ninians, Stirling. It was one of the first catholic schools to be built in Scotland. When it first opened, it incorporated 410 pupils and grew to its maximum potential of 1200 pupils when the school leaving age was raised to 16 in 1972.

In 2008 St. Modan's High School moved to a new site as part of Stirling Councils £10 million Public Private Partnership regeneration of schools. The new site was originally planned for a field adjacent to Bannockburn High School however due to Historic Scotland objections the new site was announced as being in Springkerse Retail Park in Stirling directly opposite the Holiday Inn Hotel. This effectively meant that all children now have to be "bussed" to the new school. The school is also next door to Forthbank Stadium home of Scottish Football League Second Division side Stirling Albion which gives the school some access to new sporting activities for pupils.

== Academics ==
In its 2009 inspection report by Her Majesty's Inspectorate of Education, St Modan's was awarded an "Excellent" rating (Sector leading) for both the Curriculum and Meeting Learner's Needs, and "Very Good" ratings for all other aspects of delivery. At that time the report indicated "in almost all key measures of attainment, results are consistently better than they are in schools which serve young people with similar needs and backgrounds" and also that "young people’s behaviour is exemplary and they show care and concern for each other".

== Headteacher ==
Claire Friel is the current headteacher, she is the daughter of Charlie Gallagher who was a part of the famous 1967 Celtic Lisbon Lions squad.

== Famous pupils ==
- Billy Bremner
- Joe McGhee
- Gordon Brewer
- Eddie Pollock
- Stevie McCrorie
- Cameron Coles
- Ally Dick
- Lawrence Donegan
- Andrew Hardie, Baron Hardie
