= 10 Light Street (Baltimore) =

Residential building in Baltimore, Maryland

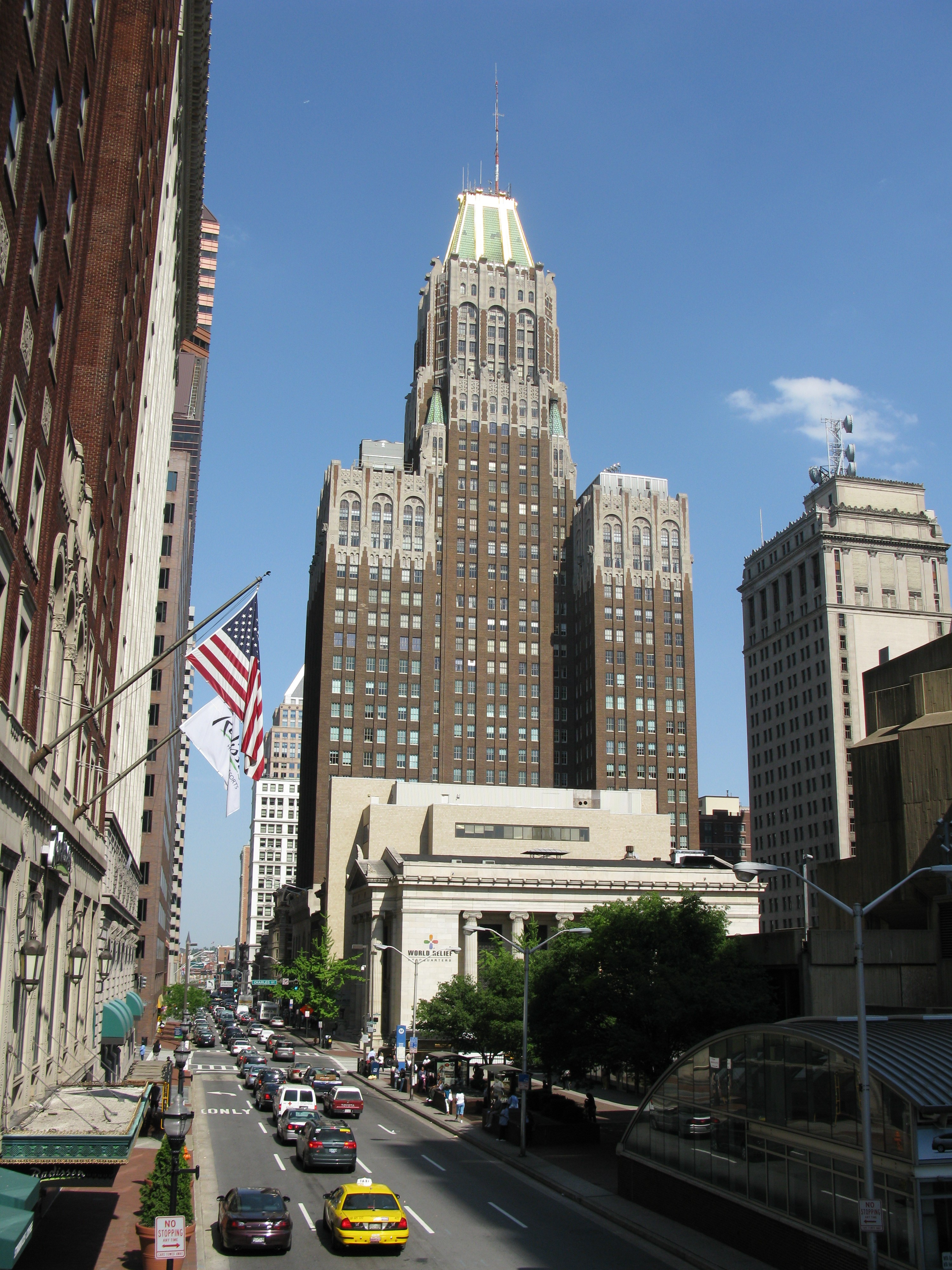

General information
- Type: Residential
- Architectural style: Art Deco
- Location: 10 Light Street; Baltimore, Maryland
- Coordinates: 39.2892°N 76.6141°W
- Completed: 1929
- Owner: CP5 10 Light Street LLC (Arrive Inner Harbor)

Height
- Antenna spire: 179.832 m (590.00 ft)
- Roof: 155.143 m (509.00 ft)

Technical details
- Floor count: 37

Design and construction
- Architects: Taylor & Fisher; Smith & May
- Developer: J. Henry Miller & Son
- Structural engineer: Girard Engineering, Inc.

10 Light Street is a historic 34-story Art Deco 155 m (509 ft) skyscraper located at the corner of East Baltimore Street and Light Street in downtown Baltimore, Maryland. Constructed as the Baltimore Trust Company Building, it was converted to apartments in 2015 and is currently named Arrive Inner Harbor.

== Description ==
10 Light Street was the tallest building in the state of Maryland, and the tallest office building in the United States south of New York City when it was completed in 1929. The Art Deco building was designed by the firm of Taylor and Fisher, was completed in eighteen months. It is constructed of Indiana sandstone and local brick over a steel frame and had an original cost of US$3 million.

The building's exterior is decorated with carved Romanesque human and animal images, stylized eagles, and is capped with a copper-and-gold roof. The ornate, two-story main banking lobby includes mosaic floors designed by Hildreth Meiere, as well as historic murals by Griffith Baily Coale and McGill Mackall depicting historic themes: the Baltimore fire of 1904, and the writing of the National Anthem at the Battle of Baltimore during the War of 1812. A 2015 report noted that the mosaics would be covered by artificial turf as part of an Under Armour gym.

== History ==
Shortly after the Baltimore Trust Company moved into the building in 1929, the onset of Great Depression caused the company to struggle. The building was essentially vacant within a year, and the bank went into bankruptcy in 1933 and receivership in 1935. The empty building was subsequently used by the New Deal's Public Works Administration in Maryland.

From the 1940s into the 1960s, the building was known first as the Mathieson Building and later the O'Sullivan Building, reflecting its major tenants at the time. In 1947, the building housed the transmitter and antenna of WMAR-TV, the first TV station in Maryland and 14th overall in the country and the 3rd CBS affiliate. At that time, just down the Street was Sun Place, the headquarters of the Baltimore Sun who founded the TV station. The top floor that once housed the WMAR-TV facility has since been converted into a private lounge for tenants, while the TV tower atop the building remains in place but is no longer in use.

During those years, Semmes, Bowen and Semmes, a major Maryland law firm with origins in the 19th century, occupied the twenty-first floor, according to the 1952 memoir of Whittaker Chambers, whose Semmes attorneys were Richard F. Cleveland and William D. Macmillan, and the firm later occupied as many as four floors (when it employed almost 150 attorneys), remaining in 10 Light Street until approximately 1990, when the building was known as the "Baltimore Trust Building".

In 1961, the building was purchased by Maryland National Bank, successor to Baltimore Trust, and the building name was changed to the "Maryland National Bank Building". Maryland National was itself purchased by NationsBank in 1993, and the name of the building was changed again, to NationsBank Building. The structure was again renamed the Bank of America Building following NationsBank's merger with BankAmerica in 1997. Major portions of the building were restored, including the copper-clad dome, which was once again floodlit at night.

In December 2012, the building was acquired by a Virginia firm, Metropolitan Partnership Ltd., which converted all floors above the fourth into 445 residential apartments, which opened in 2015. The lower floors of the building were retained for retail tenants. Bank of America announced that it would close the ground floor banking center in May 2013. Miles & Stockbridge, a prominent Baltimore law firm, had maintained offices in the building since 1932 when one of the firm's founders, Clarence Miles, moved into the building. As part of the redevelopment, a portion of the ground floor was fitted out for the FX Studios and Under Armour Performance Center, while the remaining space has been used for apartments and office space, and a penthouse level was added to the building.

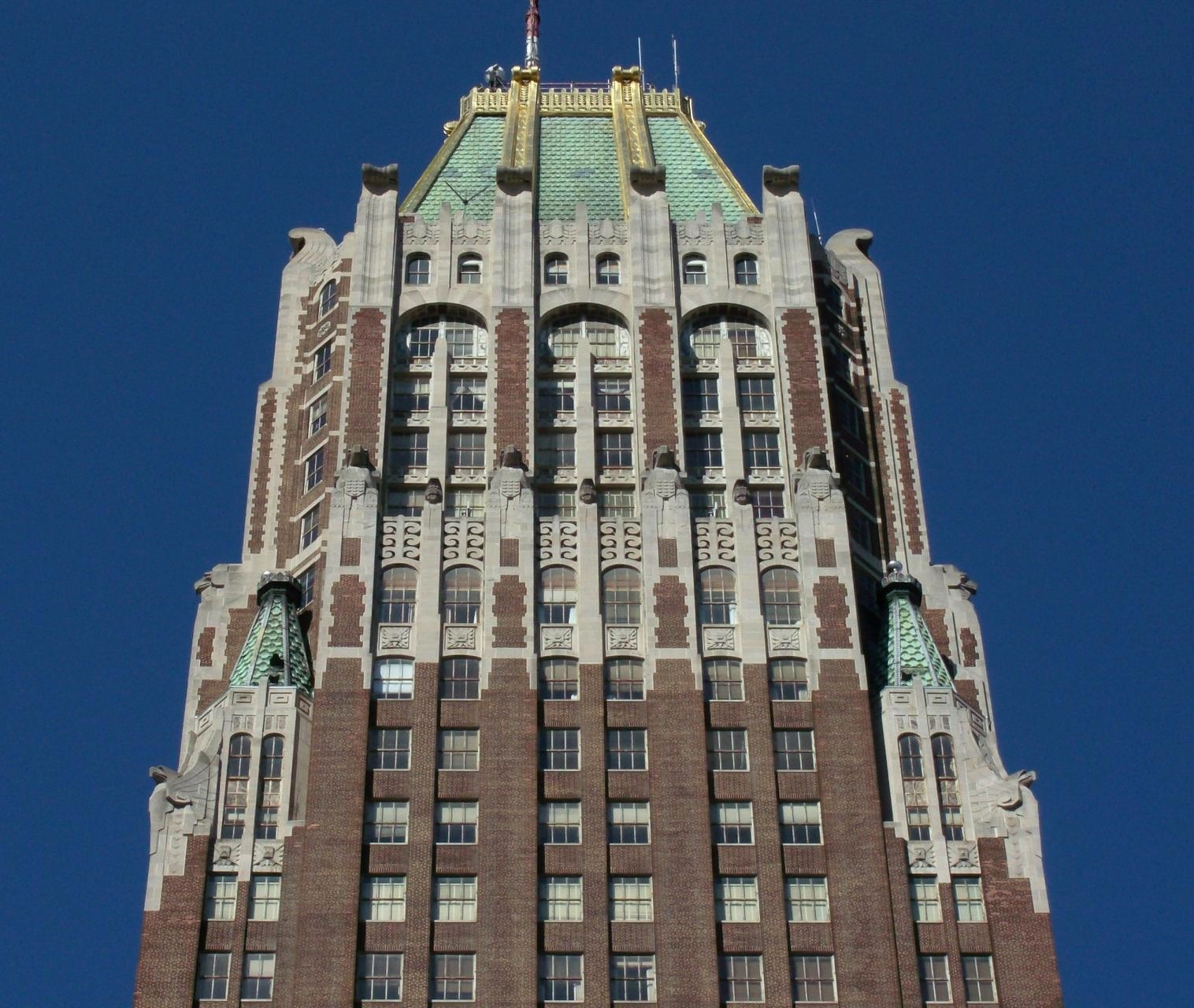
Top of the building

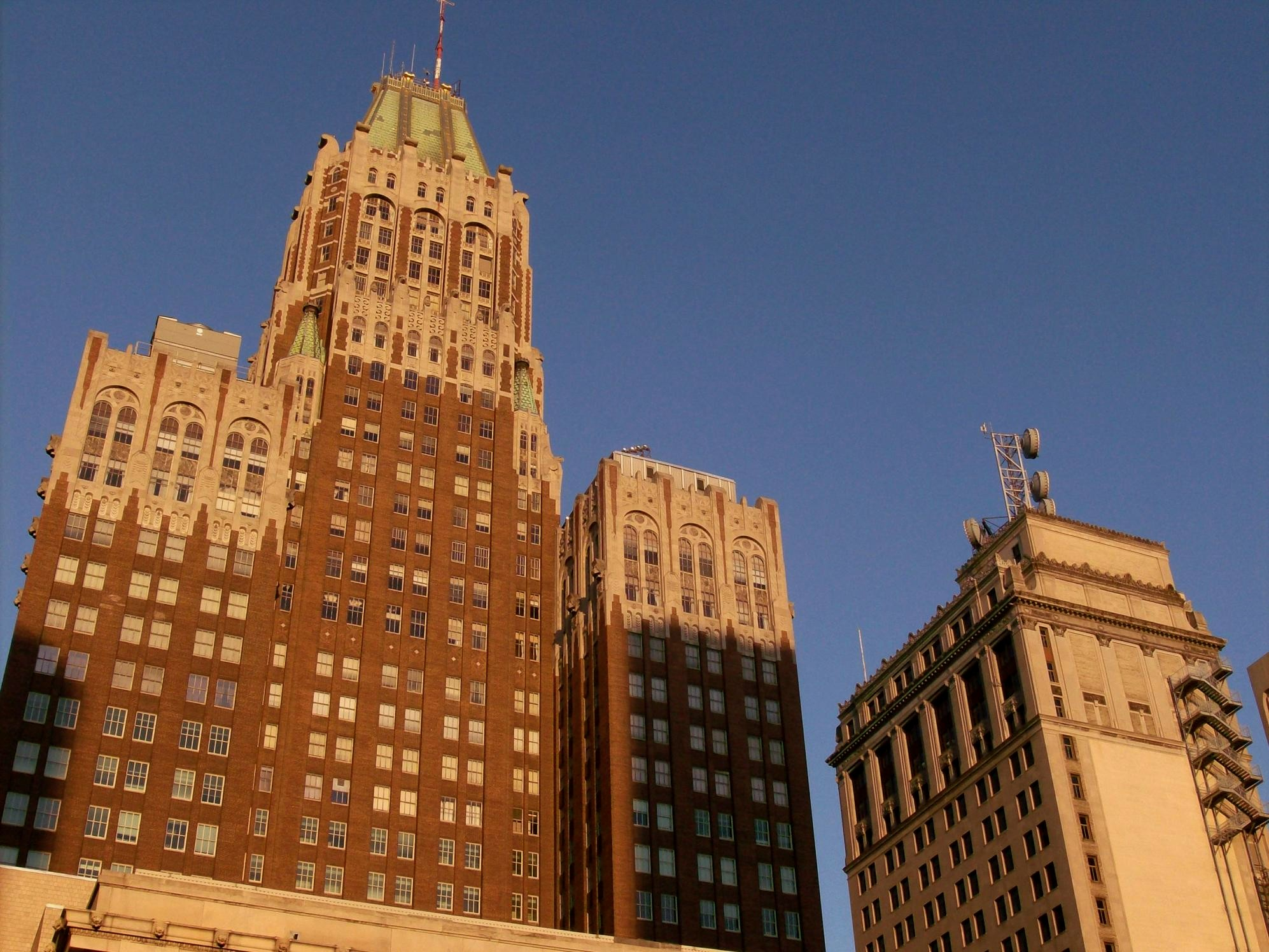
Rear side view from West Baltimore Street

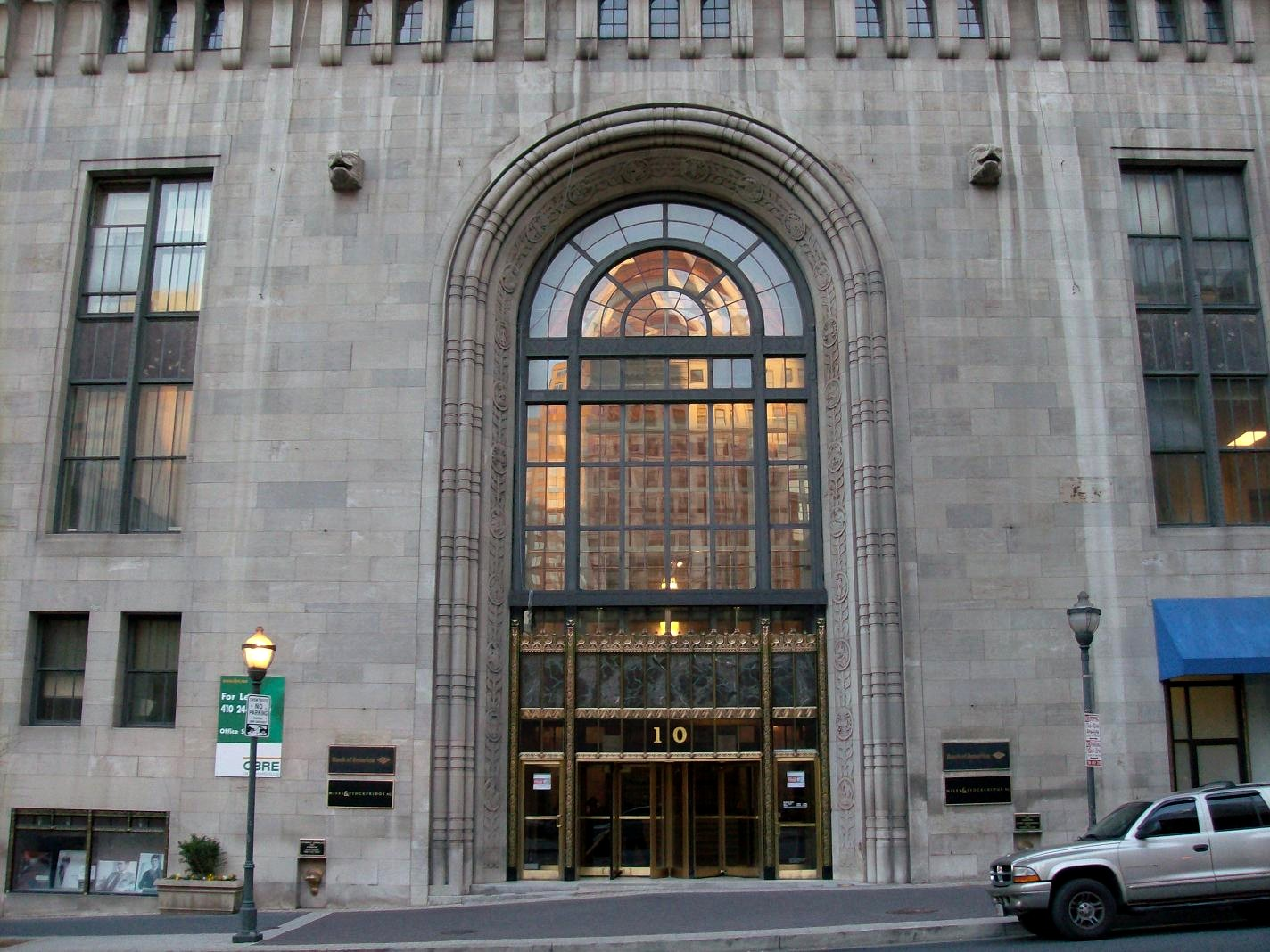
Main entrance on 10 Light Street

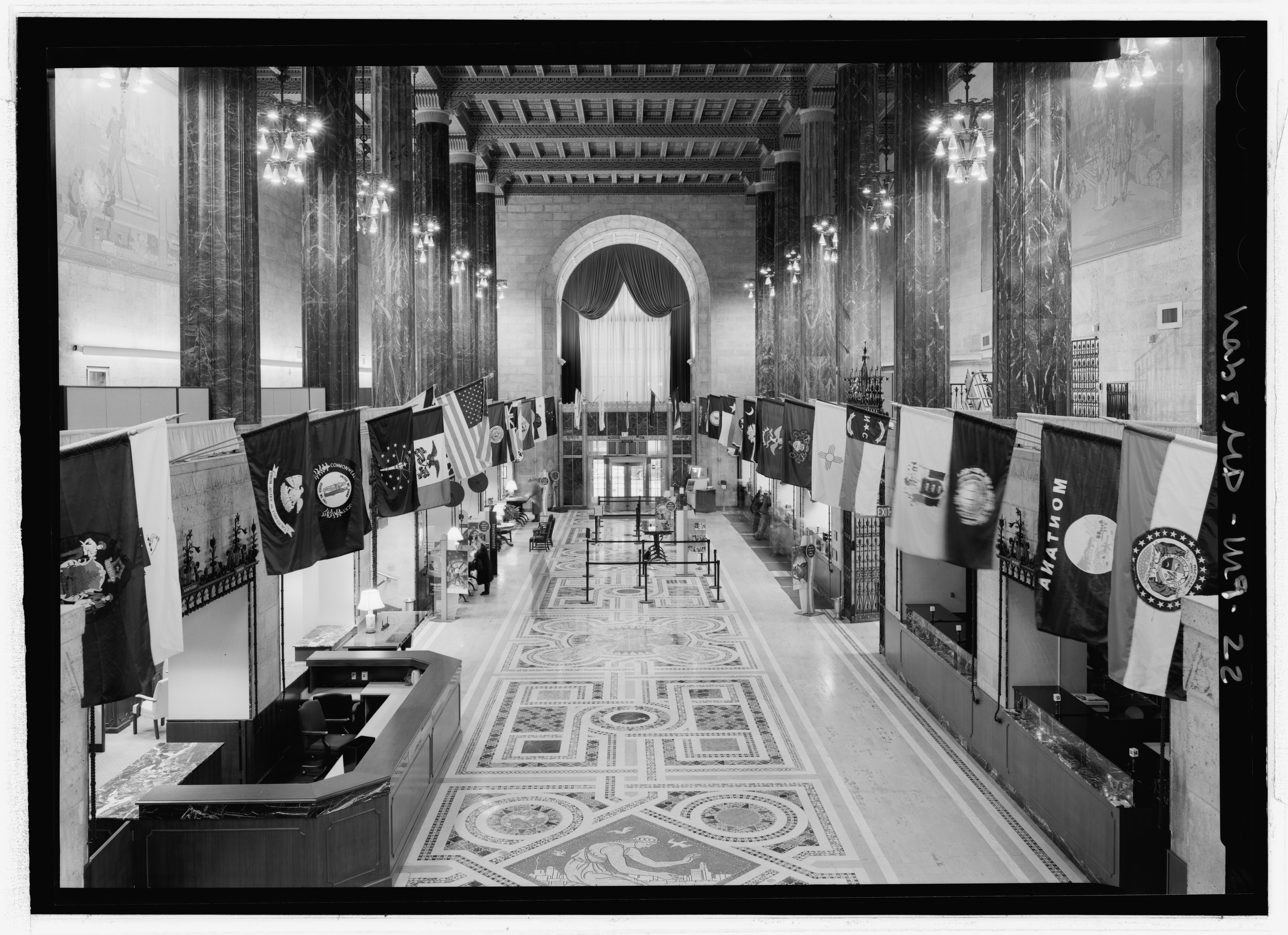
The historic lobby floor pictured in 1933, now covered by artificial turf for the UA Fitness Performance Center

== See also ==
- List of tallest buildings in Baltimore
