= Hildreth Meière =

American artist (1892–1961)

- Born: September 3, 1892; New York City, New York, U.S.
- Died: May 2, 1961 (aged 68)
- Known for: Muralist, Painting, Architectural Design, Mosaic
- Movement: Art Deco

Hildreth Meière (/mɛaɪɛr/, me-AIR) (September 3, 1892 — May 2, 1961) was an American muralist active in the first half of the twentieth century who is especially known for her Art Deco designs. During her 40-year career, she completed approximately 100 commissions. She designed murals for office buildings, churches, government centers, theaters, restaurants, cocktail lounges, ocean liners, and world’s fair pavilions, and she worked in a wide variety of mediums, including paint, ceramic tile, glass and marble mosaic, terracotta, wood, metal, and stained glass. Among her extensive body of work are the iconographic interiors at the Nebraska State Capitol in Lincoln, the dynamic roundels of Dance, Drama, and Song at Radio City Music Hall, the apse and narthex mosaics and stained-glass windows at St. Bartholomew's Episcopal Church (Manhattan), and the decoration of the Great Hall at the National Academy of Sciences in Washington, D.C.

== Early life ==
Hildreth Meière was born in Flushing, Queens, New York City in 1892. In 1911, after graduating from the Academy of the Sacred Heart, a Roman Catholic girls’ boarding school in Manhattan, Meière spent a year in Florence studying painting with an English artist. The Renaissance frescoes that she saw in Italy had a great impact on the direction her career would take. As she later wrote, "I fell in love, once and for all, with mural painting and great beautiful walls.”

Meière furthered her studies at the Art Students League of New York, the California School of Fine Arts in San Francisco (now the San Francisco Art Institute), the School of the Art Institute of Chicago, and the School of Applied Design for Women in New York where she participated in design competitions administered by the Beaux-Arts Institute of Design. During World War I, Meière served her country as a draftsman in the U.S. Navy.

== Career ==
Meière began her career designing costumes and sets for the theater. In 1921 she was introduced to the architect Bertram Grosvenor Goodhue who gave Meière her first major mural commission, the decoration of the Great Hall at the National Academy of Sciences in Washington, D.C. Goodhue also selected Meière to design the interiors of the Nebraska State Capitol in Lincoln, Meière’s largest and one of her most important commissions. Over an eight-year period, she designed decorations for the Capitol vestibule, foyer, rotunda, and senate and house chambers.

Meière went on to design murals for buildings throughout the country, although some of her best work can be found in Manhattan. She became especially well known for integrating murals within architectural settings. As she once stated, a good mural “cannot be taken away without hurting the design of the building.” Although Meière is most closely associated with the Art Deco movement, she was capable of designing in a variety of styles depending on the needs and wishes of her clients. She was a businesswoman in her approach to commissions, ensuring that she and her work were suitable promoted. Her work ethic was strong and she managed clients expectations and deadlines effectively.

During World War II, Meière organized a group of artists to paint portable three-panel altarpieces, or triptychs, that The Citizens Committee for the Army and Navy distributed to American military camps, airfields, and ships throughout the world. More than 500 triptychs were produced and Meière herself painted more than 70. She also taught first aid for the Red Cross.

Meière kept good records and had her work photographed at plan stage and the completed installation.

== Professional organizations ==
As Meière herself wrote, “I have always been active in professional organizations, believing that we owe some of our time and energies to them." She was the first woman ever appointed to the New York City Art Commission and she was a founder of the Liturgical Arts Society and served as the organization's first president. She served four terms as President of the National Society of Mural Painters; six terms as First Vice President of the Architectural League of New York; Director of the Municipal Arts Society; Director of the Department of Mural Decoration at the Beaux Arts Institute of Design; member of the Architectural Guild of America; and a board member of the Art Students League, the Municipal Arts Society, the School Art League, and the Advisory Committee of the Cooper Union Art School, all in New York.

== Awards and recognition ==
Meière’s first major award came in recognition of one of her early projects. In 1928, a full six years before the Architectural League of New York admitted female members, the organization awarded Meière a gold medal in Mural Decoration for her work at the Nebraska State Capitol.

The U.S. War Department recognized the work she did with the Citizens Committee for the Army and Navy during World War II. In 1956, she became the first woman to win the Fine Arts Medal of the American Institute of Architects. Manhattanville College, Meière's alma mater, presented her with an honorary doctorate in 1953, and in 1959 the school presented here with a distinguished service award.

== Legacy ==
The International Hildreth Meière Association was formed to "promote and perpetuate" her legacy and maintains a searchable database of her work.

== Selected works ==
For a complete list of Hildreth Meière’s work see The Art Deco Murals of Hildreth Meière, Catherine Coleman Brawer and Kathleen Murphy Skolnik. New York City: Andrea Monfried Editions, 2014.

- Painted and gilded gesso decorations for the Great Hall of the National Academy of Sciences in Washington, D.C. 1924
- Interiors, including ceramic tile domes, marble mosaic floors, leather doors, and gold-leaf stenciled designs, for the Nebraska State Capitol, Lincoln, Nebraska, 1924–32
- Glazed ceramic tile decoration for the vaults and apse ceiling at Rockefeller Memorial Chapel, University of Chicago, 1928
- Marble floor mosaics at the Baltimore Trust Building, 1929
- Glass mosaics for the apse and narthex and four stained-glass clerestory windows for the nave at St. Bartholomew's Church, New York City, 1929–56
- Glass mosaics for the arch and ark of the main sanctuary at Temple Emanu-El, New York City, 1929
- Consultant on color and scale for the Red Room on the ground floor of 1 Wall Street (originally the Irving Trust Company Building, later the Bank of New York Mellon Building and the space is now a part of Printemps department store), New York City, 1931
- Dance, Drama, Song (1932), three metal and enamel roundels for the 50th Street facade of the Radio City Music Hall building at Rockefeller Center, New York City (executed by Oscar Bach)
- Glass mosaic lobby ceiling and tile map for the lobby wall of the AT&T Long Distance Building, New York City, 1932
- Two projects for the 1933 Century of Progress Exposition in Chicago—a large painted mural entitled The Progress of Women through Organization and the terracotta tile floor of a pool for the Communications Court
- Multiple projects for the 1939 New York World’s Fair
- Oil-on-canvas mural for the ocean liner SS President Monroe, commissioned by the United States Maritime Commission and the Section of Painting and Sculpture (1940)
- Inlaid marble altar frontal depicting the Annunciation for the Lady Chapel at St. Patrick's Cathedral, New York, 1942
- Glass mosaics and majolica frieze at the Cathedral Basilica of Saint Louis, St. Louis, Missouri, 1945–61
- Glass mosaic of the risen Christ for the half-dome of the apse of the Resurrection Chapel at Washington National Cathedral, Washington, D.C., 1951
- Map of the Mississippi in gesso and metal-leaf for the Cabin Class Lounge, SS United States; Meière also worked, along with Austin Purves, Jr., on the overall design of the ship interiors, 1952
- Three-part marble mosaic mural for the lobby of Prudential Plaza, Newark, New Jersey, 1960

== Books ==
- Brawer, Catherine Coleman (2009). Walls speak : the narrative art of Hildreth Meière. St. Bonaventure, N.Y. ISBN 978-1-935314-00-4. OCLC 435813160.
- Brawer, Catherine Coleman; Skolnik, Kathleen Murphy; Wilson, Richard Guy (2014). The Art Deco murals of Hildreth Meière. New York. ISBN 978-0-9910263-0-2. OCLC 864090420.

== Images ==
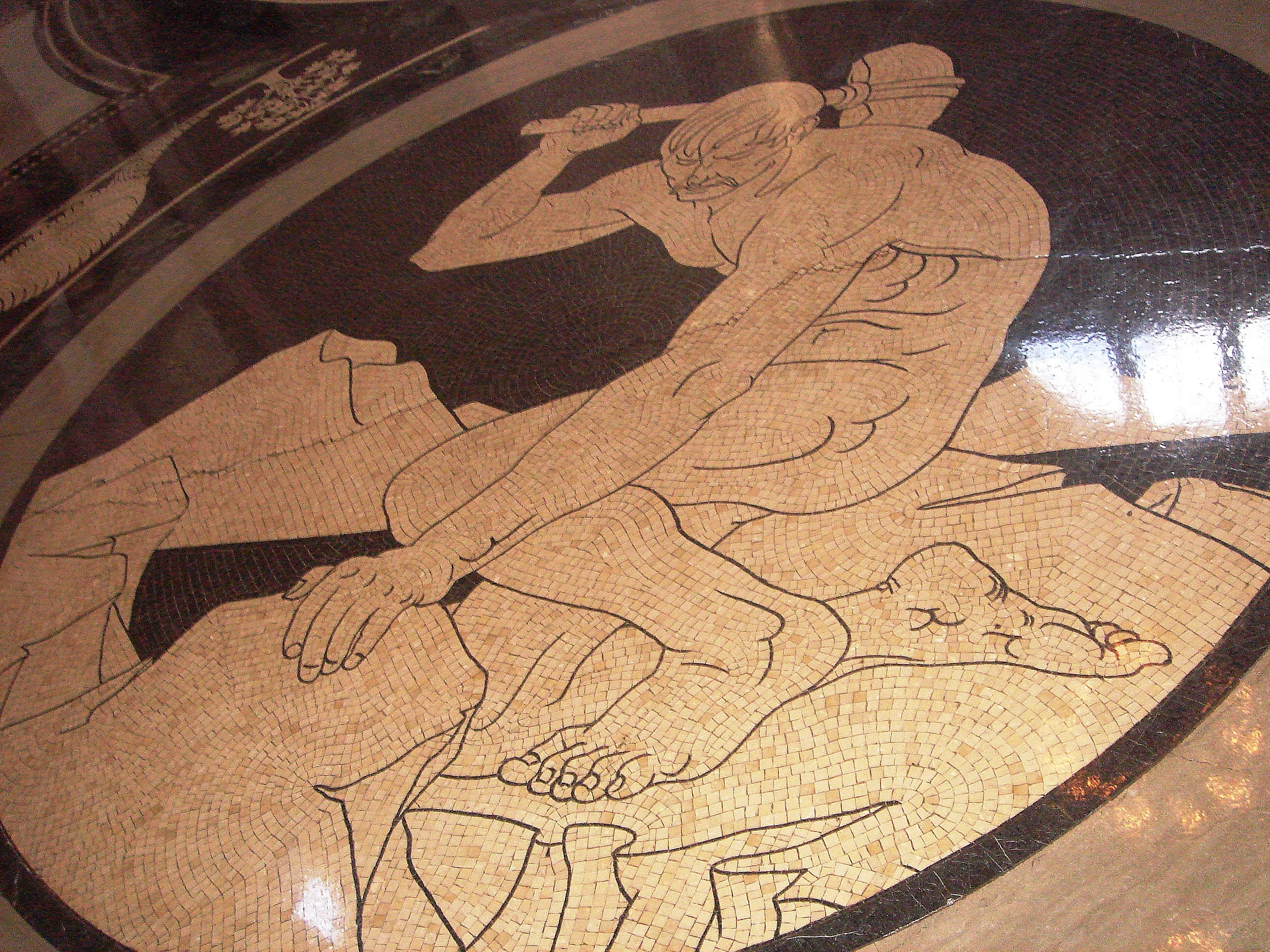
Nebraska State Capitol floor mosaic

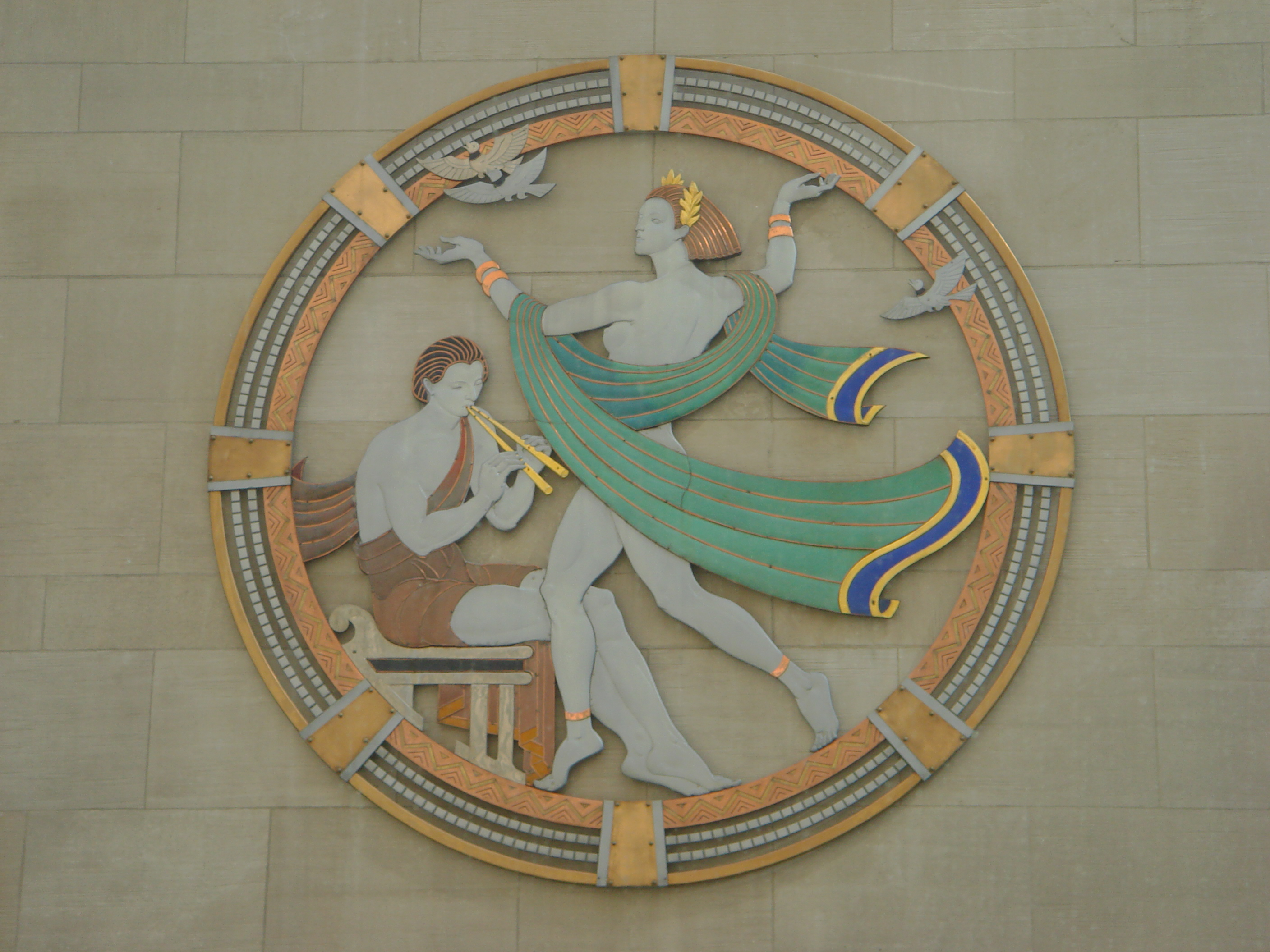
Song, Radio City Music Hall roundel

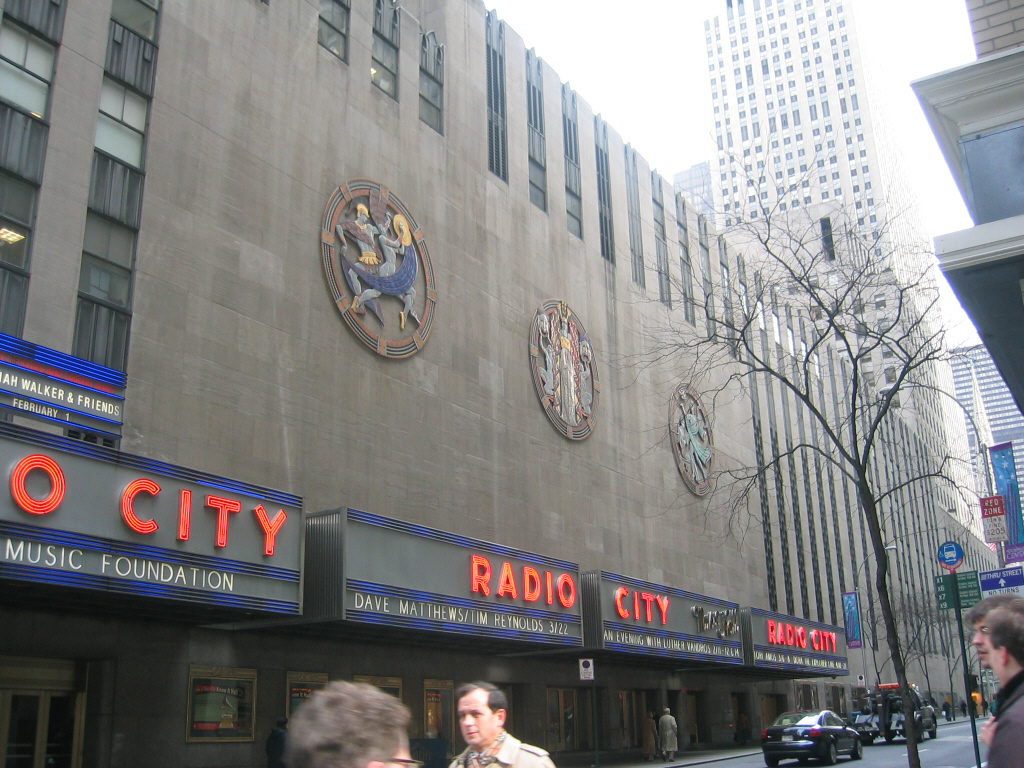
Three roundels in situ

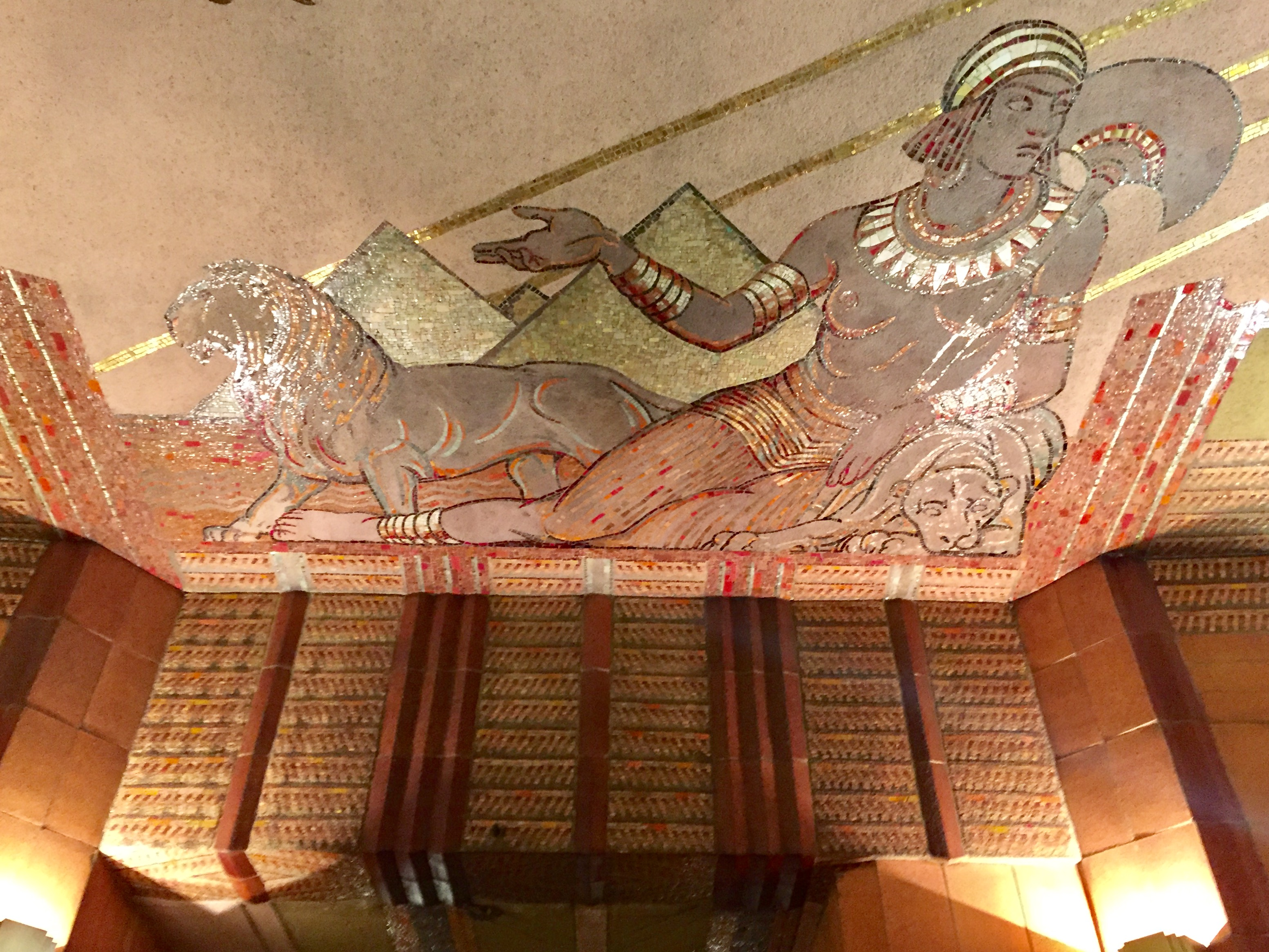
Africa Mosaic Detail AT&T Long Distance Building Lobby

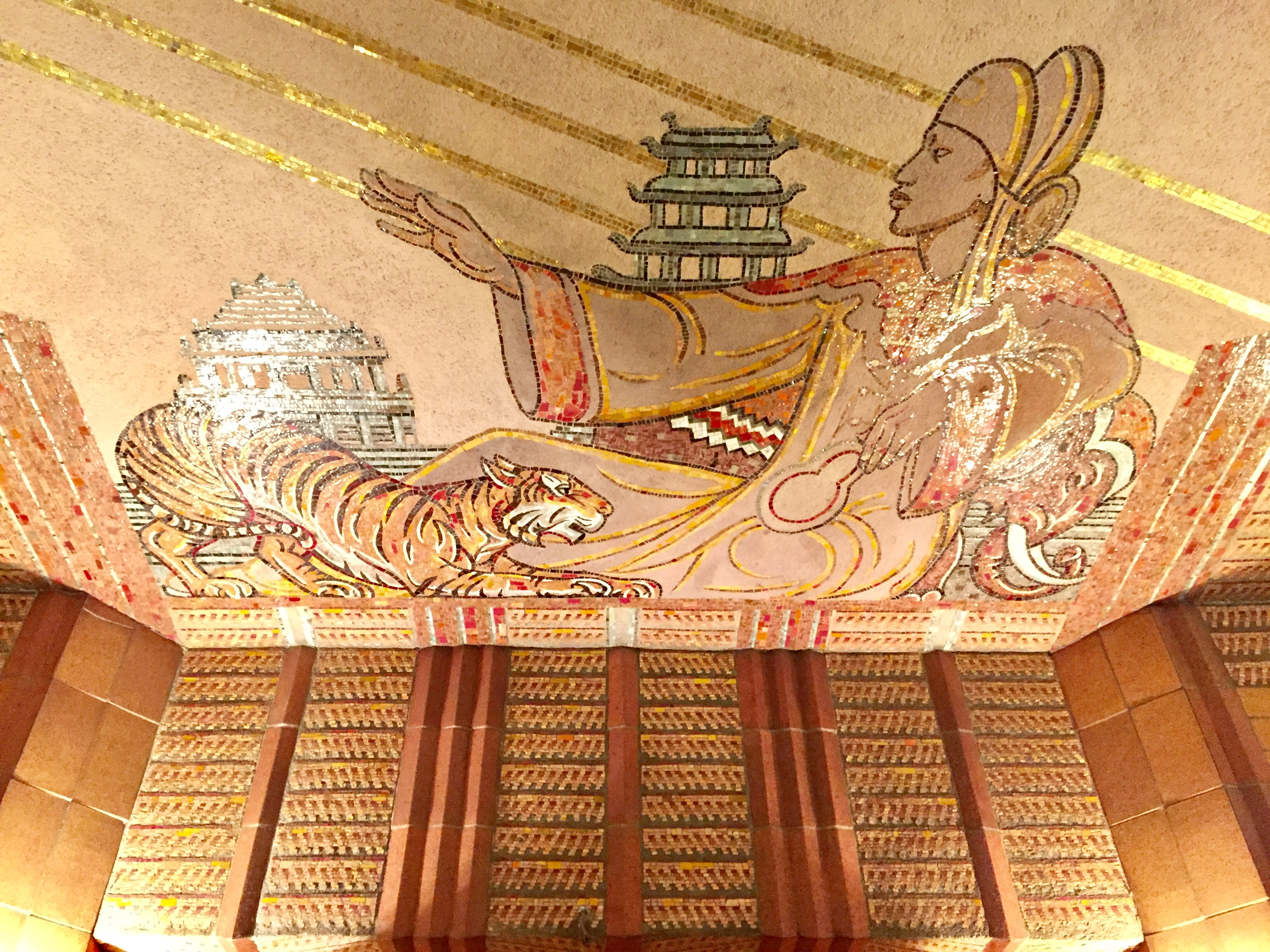
Asia Mosaic Detail AT&T Long Distance Building Lobby

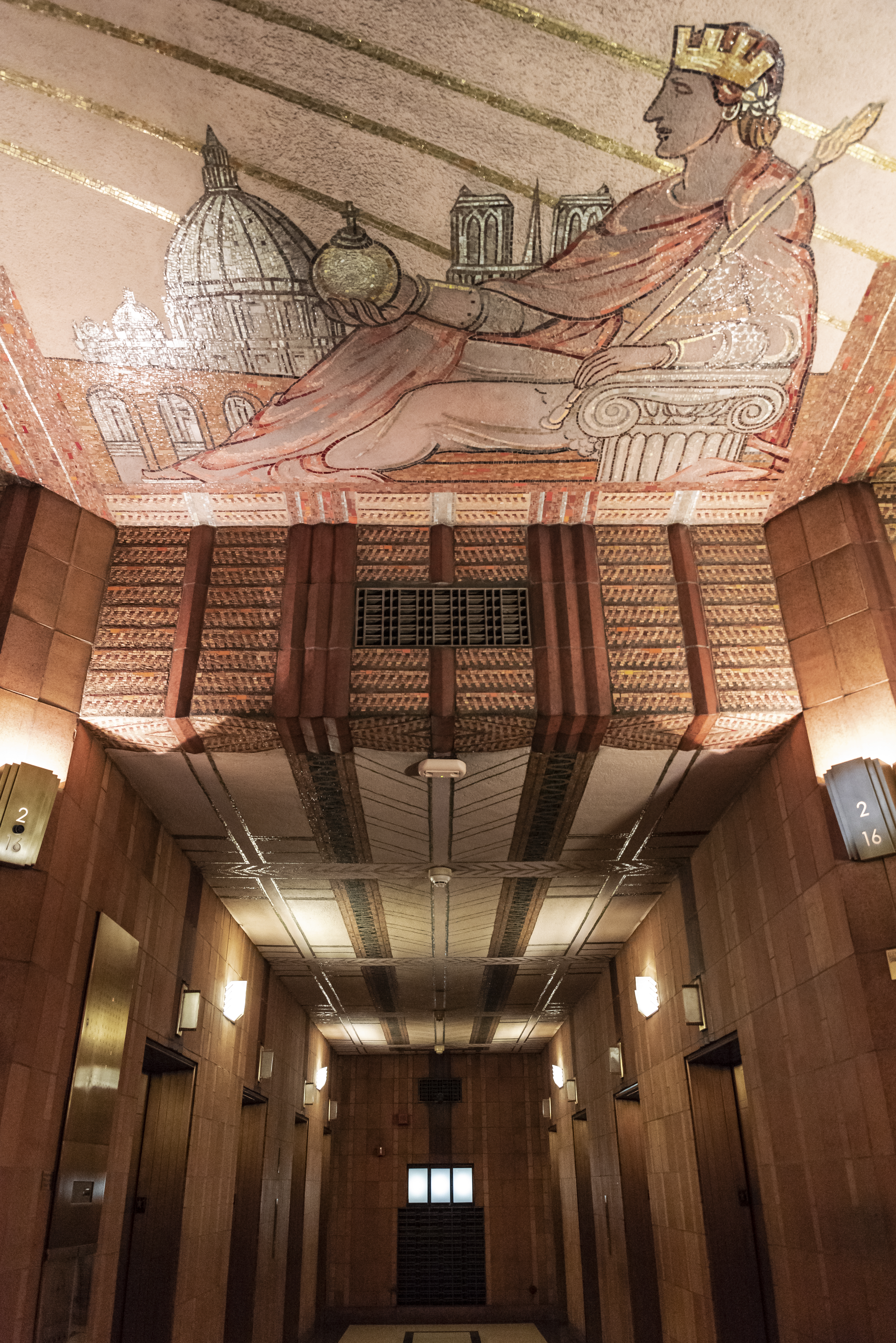
AT & T Long Distance Lobby Europe

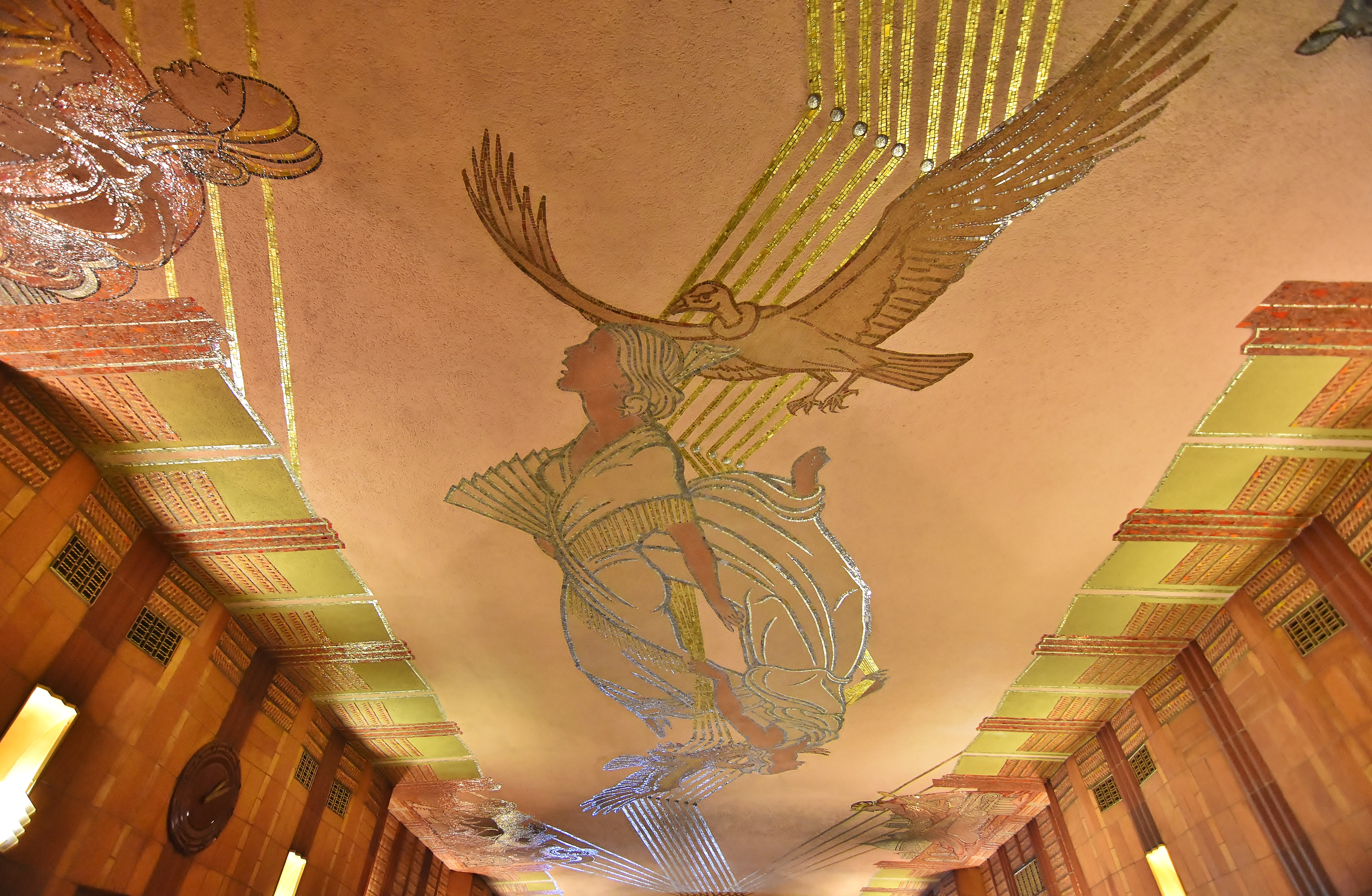
AT&T Lobby 3

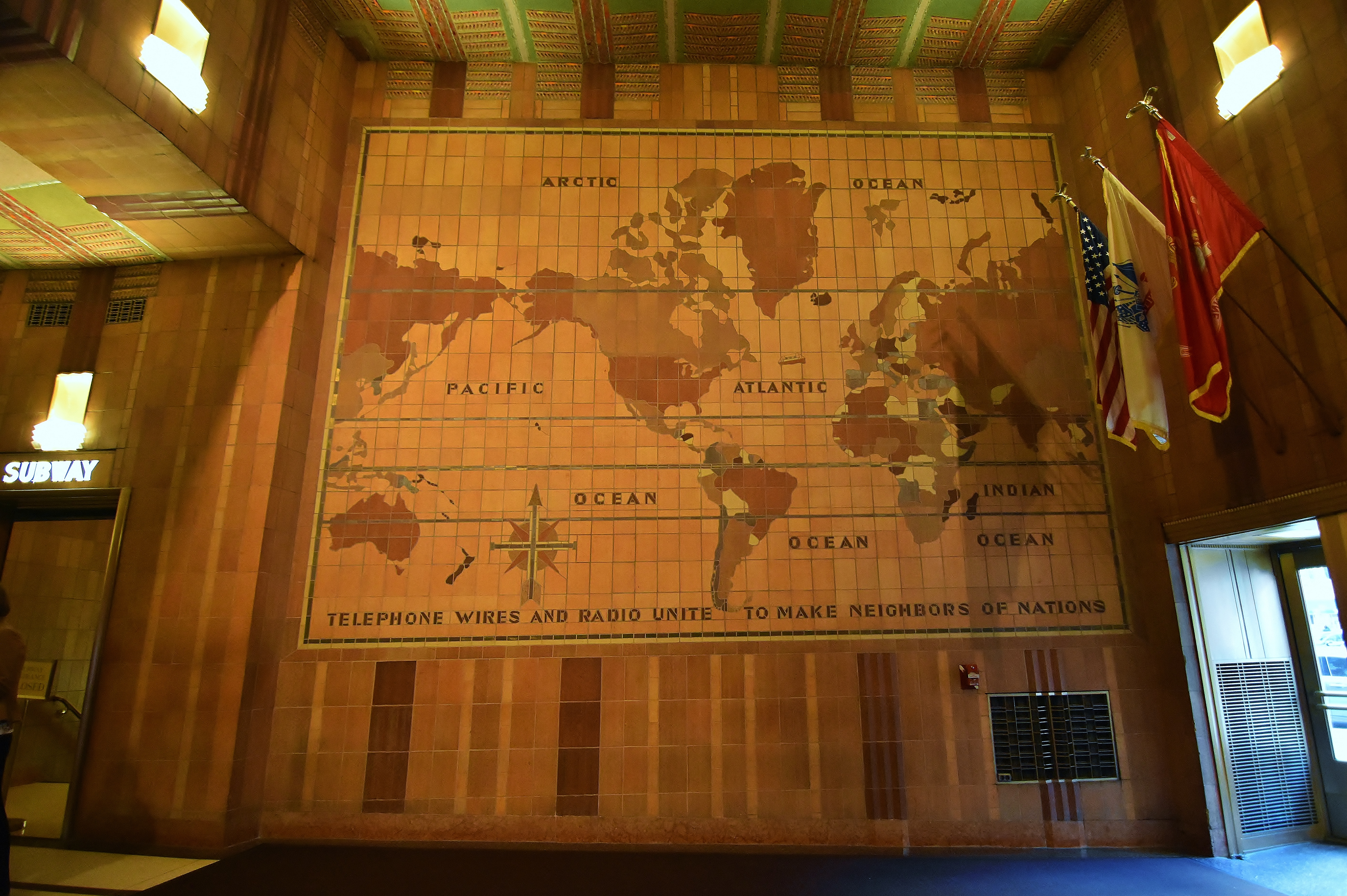
AT&T Lobby 4

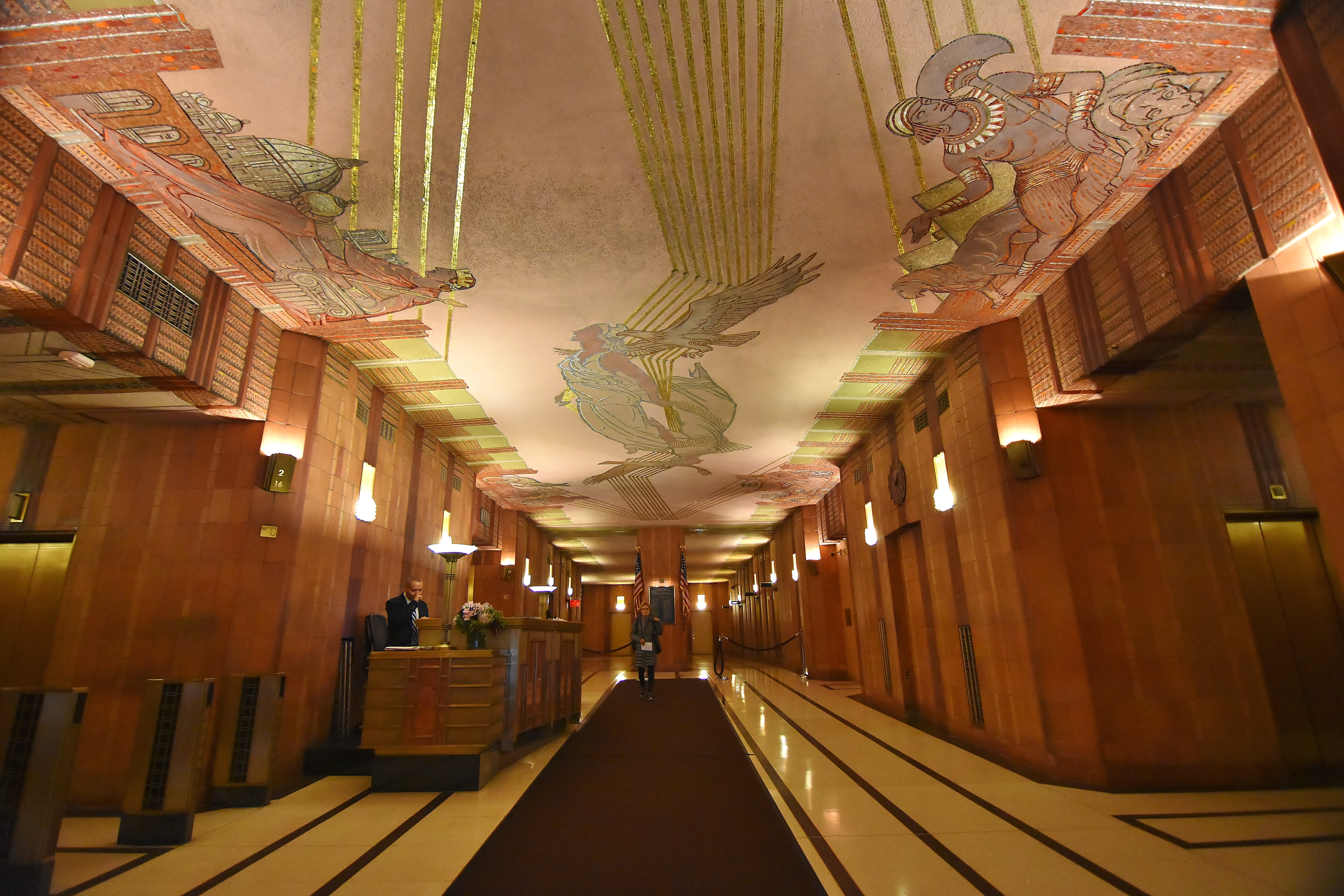
AT&T Lobby 5

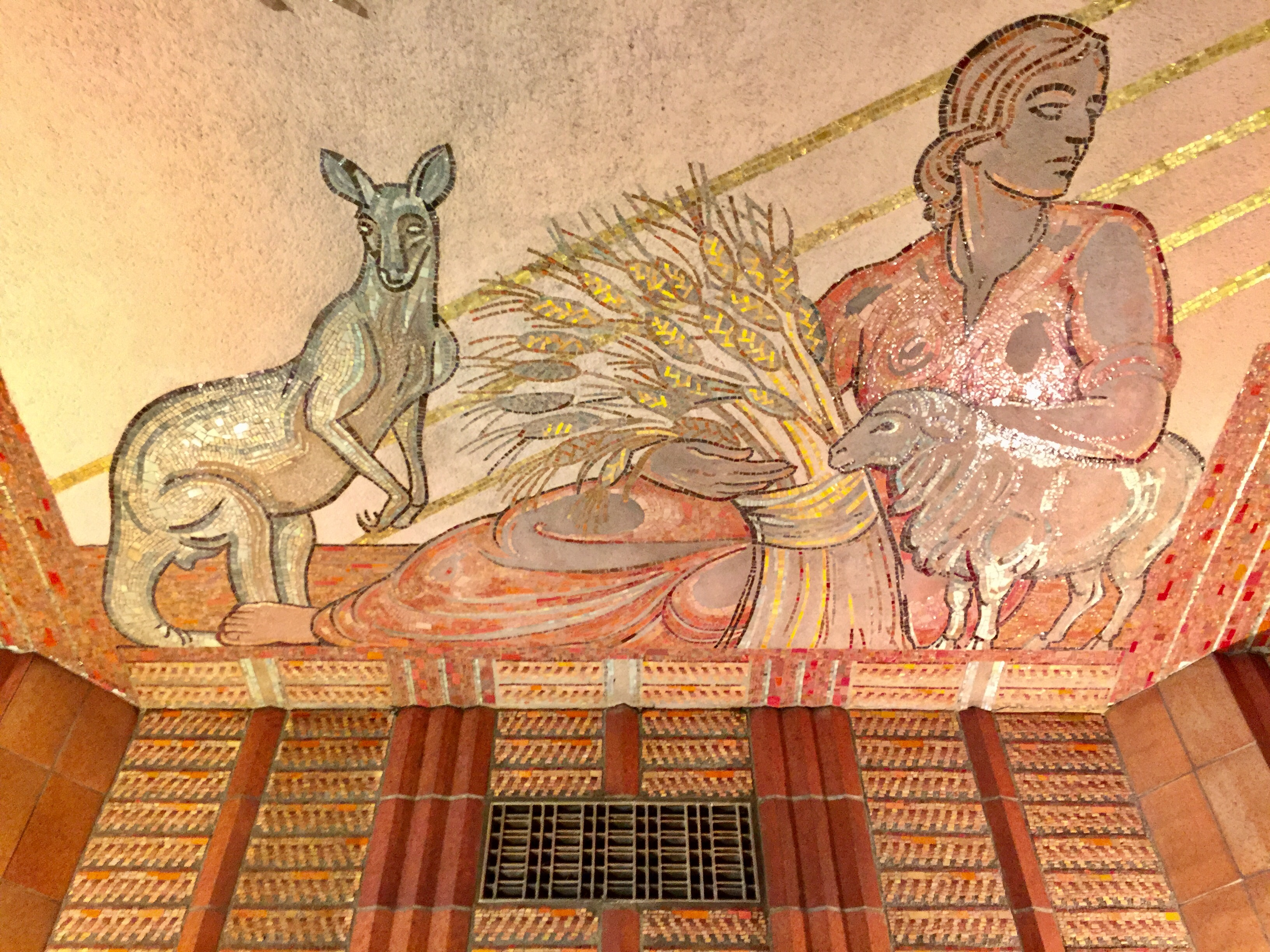
Australia Mosaic Detail AT&T Long Distance Building Lobby
