= Coales =

Coales is a surname. Notable people with the name include:

- John Flavell Coales {1907–1999), British physicist and engineer
- William Coales (1886–1960), English long-distance runner

== See also ==
- Coale (surname)
- Coles (disambiguation)
