= Griffith Baily Coale =

American painter

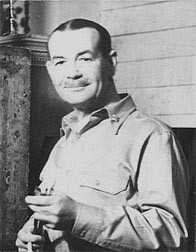
Griffith Baily Coale (c. 1942)

Griffith Baily Coale (21 May 1890 in Baltimore – 20 August 1950 in Stonington) was an American painter; best known for establishing the Navy Combat Art Program.

== Biography ==
His father, William Ellis Coale, was a prominent member of Baltimore society. After showing an early interest in art, he received enthusiastic support from his family. From 1909 to 1911, he attended the Maryland Institute College of Art and served as President of the Art Students' League. Shortly after, he travelled to Paris, where he studied with William Laparra (at the Académie Julian), and with the expatriate American artist, Richard E. Miller; focusing on murals. He exhibited a few of his works at the Salon in 1913 and 1914. This was followed by a brief period in Munich, studying at a private art school operated by Moritz Heymann.

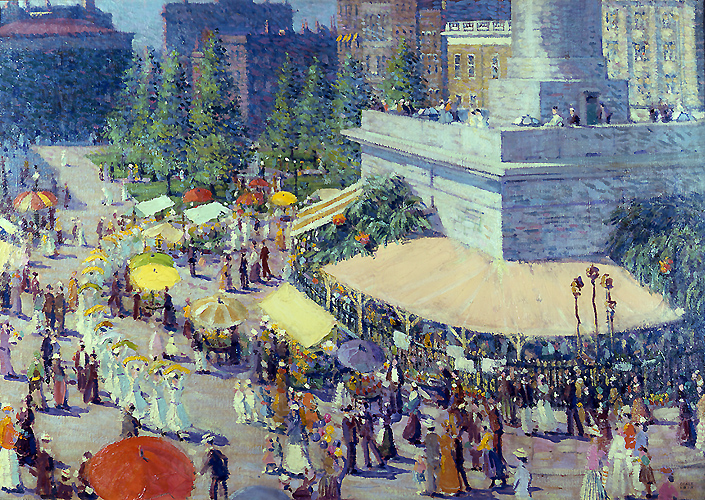
The Baltimore Flower Market

After trips to Italy and Spain, he returned to Baltimore in 1915; working as a freelance painter. That same year, he married Margaret Gordon McCulloch, an immigrant from Ireland. During the final years of World War I (1917-1918), he worked as a camoufleur for the U.S. Shipping Board; painting both military and civilian ships at the Port of Baltimore.

In the post-war years, he travelled throughout the Northeast, spending much of his time in New York and Connecticut. Eventually, in 1922, he settled in New York City. There, he painted portraits and murals and became a member of the National Society of Mural Painters. Numerous companies and organizations commissioned murals from him; including Lee, Higginson & Co. and the Brooklyn Borough Gas Company. His works may be seen at the Metropolitan Life Insurance Company Tower, the Criminal Courts Building, and the City Bank Farmers Trust Building. In 1932, together with the stained glass artist, Robert McGill Mackall (1889-1982), he decorated the Baltimore Trust Company Building.

In 1941, as it became more likely that the United States would have to enter World War II, he approached Admiral Chester W. Nimitz and proposed having artists placed on board Navy ships, to document what they saw in paintings. This derived from his own personal experiences in World War I, as well as being inspired by the war art program of the British Navy. Admiral Nimitz was impressed with his proposal and established the Navy Combat Art program.

Later that year, he was commissioned as a Lieutenant Commander in the Naval Reserve, working for the Office of Public Affairs. As part of his first assignment in the North Atlantic, he witnessed the sinking of the USS Reuben James. He then went to the Pacific, where he saw the aftermath of the attack on Pearl Harbor and gathered eyewitness accounts. He also observed troops training for the invasion of Midway and visited the islands after their recapture. His third assignment sent him to the South East Asia Command in Ceylon (Sri Lanka). After the war, he painted two murals (now lost) for the Naval Academy, depicting the attack on Pearl Harbor and the Battle of Midway. He left the Navy in 1947, with the rank of Commander and returned home, retiring to Connecticut, where he died in 1950, at the age of sixty.

In addition to his paintings, he authored two books describing his experiences: North Atlantic Patrol: The log of a seagoing artist (Farrar & Rinehart, 1942), and Victory at Midway (Farrar & Rinehart, 1944).

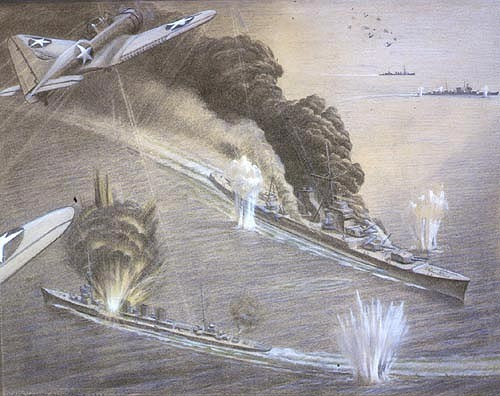
Attack on the Japanese Cruisers,
Mogami and Mikuma

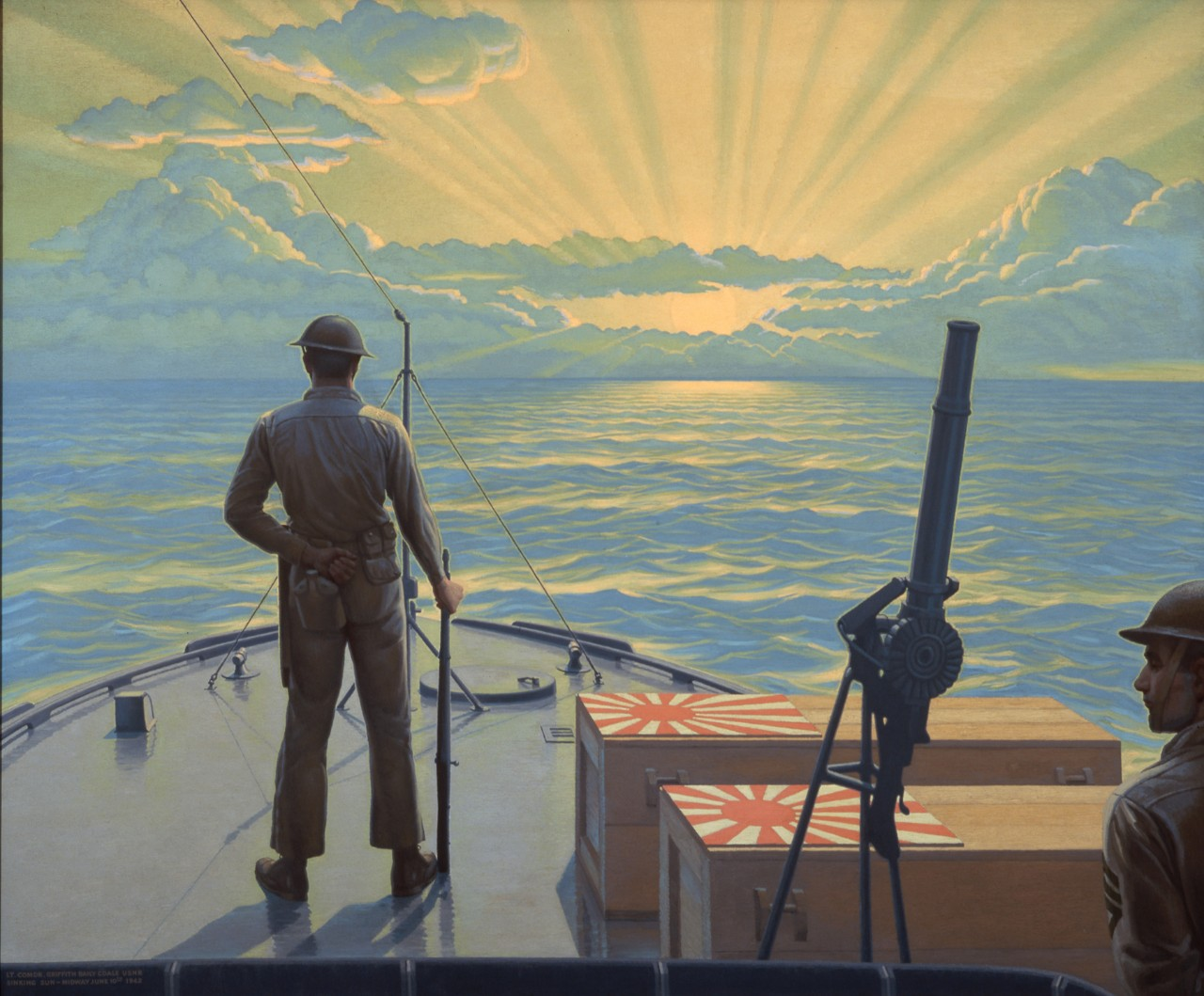
"Sinking Sun"
(The death of Japanese fliers at Midway)
