= John Coles (businessman) =

John Coles J.P.
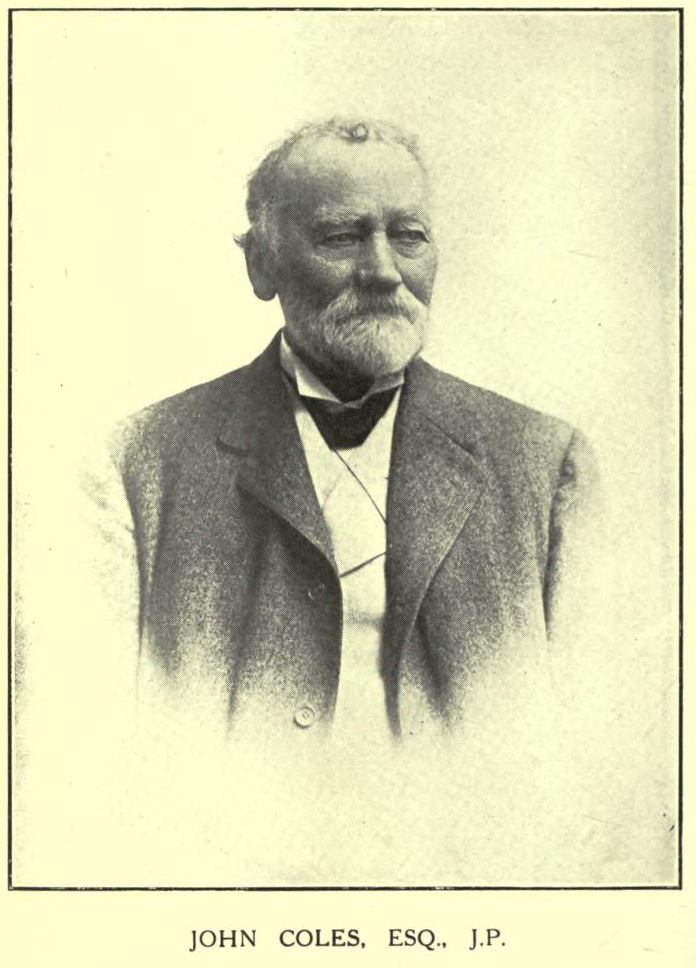
- Born: 15 April 1833; Washfield, Devon
- Died: 18 October 1919; Kensington
- Resting place: Kensal Green Cemetery
- Occupations: Stockbroker and company director

John Coles (1833–1919) was a member of the London Stock Exchange, a prominent Actuary, a Justice of the Peace for the City of London and a freeman of the borough of Tiverton, Devon.

== Early years and education ==
John Coles was born at Church Pitt, Washfield, Devon, on 15 April 1833. His father, John Coles (1807–1859) was a prominent agriculturist of Washfield and Witheridge. His mother was Harriett Tidboald of an old Devonian family from Anstey Barton, Devon. He went to the Chilcott's Free School in Tiverton and then, from 1845 to 1850, to Mr. Thomas Quicke's Academy, Kings Lodge, Exeter.

At the age of 16, in 1850, he went to London as a clerk at the Medical, Clerical and General Life Assurance Society at a salary of £40 per year. His mother's first cousin, George Henry Pinckard (1805–1892) a nephew of Dr. George Pinckard, was the chairman of the company at that time. He established a reputation for hard work and diligent study. He passed in three successive years (1853–56) the examinations of the Institute of Actuaries, of which he became a Fellow in 1864.

== Career and activities ==
In 1863 Coles was admitted as a member of the London Stock Exchange, joining the firm of J. & J. Whitehead (formerly Sir R. Carden & Whitehead), which became Whitehead & Coles, with Coles as the head in 1865. He was a Director of the Company of Adventurers trading into Hudson's Bay (Hudson's Bay Company), visiting Canada in 1896 and 1914 to view and report on the progress of the Hudson's Bay Company, travelling as far as Vancouver. He was present at the opening of the flagship Calgary store in 1913.

He was elected as a Director of the Medical and Clerical in 1871 and as chairman in 1903. He held that position until his death in 1919.

He was Chairman of the East and West India Docks Committees in 1888; a Director of the Canadian Pacific Railway; a Director of the General Reversionary Company; and a Governor of Blundell's School at Tiverton, Devon. His personal charm and strong views gave him great respect and affection from all directors and friends. He was a friend of Cecil Rhodes. A number of accounts refer to Coles as a leading financial authority and of having great influence on the insurance industry.

Coles joined the Honourable Artillery Company in 1859 and formed part of the guard of honour when Queen Victoria celebrated her silver jubilee in 1863. He was also present as a Volunteer of the Honourable Artillery Company at the Exhibition in 1862. He was Past Master of The Worshipful Company of Wheelwrights.

In 1884 Coles was adopted as the prospective Liberal candidate for Tiverton; but, before an election took place, the borough lost its separate representation and became the centre of the county division. In 1885 he contested, unsuccessfully, the St Albans division of Hertfordshire. In 1890 he was made a Justice of the Peace for the County of London.

When, in the first week of August 1914, war broke out, Coles was one of the financiers personally consulted by the then Chancellor of the Exchequer as to the measures to be taken to prevent panic and to safeguard the interests of the country.

== Benefactions ==
John Coles was proud of his Devon heritage and was a great benefactor to the Parish Church of Washfield, the borough of Tiverton and to Blundell’s School.

He is acknowledged as the largest donor to the restoration of St Mary’s Church, Washfield in 1874. A brass plaque fixed to the tower acknowledges his contribution to the church and notes that in 1901 he paid for the restoration of the tower and provided two new bells. The tenor is inscribed in Latin with the words meaning: Long live Edward VII King and Emperor. John Coles born in this parish gave me to God and the church. John Coles also paid for the repair of the first Parish Register (1554–1679).

By gift of £1,000 in 1887 he secured for Tiverton the site of the People's Park. He then provided additional funds to equip and beautify the park. He also provided funds for the Technical, Science, and Art School; the Town Library; and the Infirmary, including a completely equipped modern laundry at a cost of £400 and a nurses' block (known as the Coles Institute). As a Governor and Vice-Chairman of Blundell's School, Tiverton, he established the Physics Laboratory which was named the John Coles Laboratory. At the time of the Tercentenary of the school, on 29 June 1904, he presented the school with the Temple Memorial Portrait to commemorate the school's greatest pupil, Frederick Temple, Archbishop of Canterbury. Among the awards competed for every year at Blundell's are the Coles Memorial Prizes for mathematics.

== Freeman of the borough of Tiverton ==
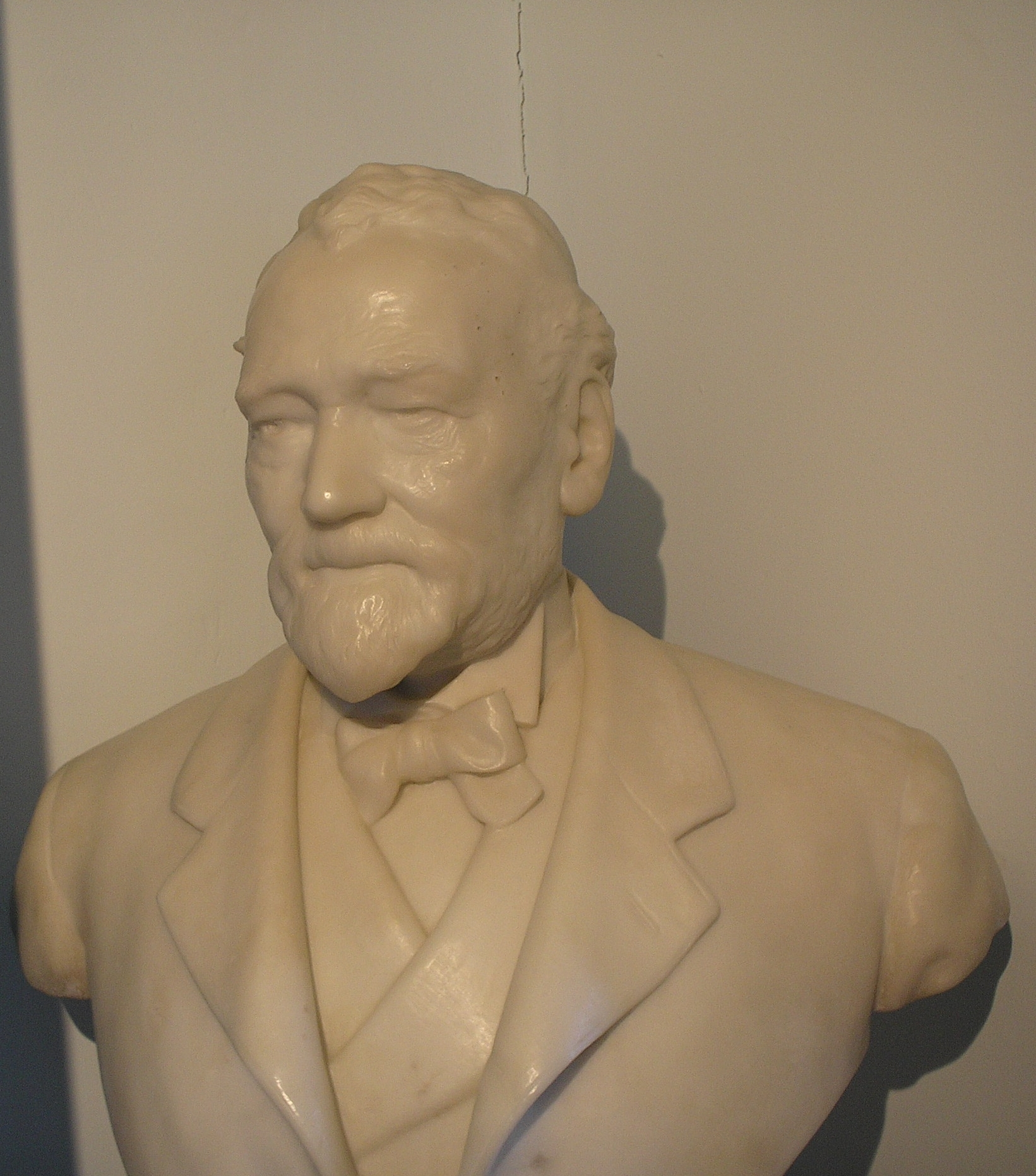
John Coles JP, Freeman of Tiverton

On 30 June 1904 John Coles was made a freeman of the borough of Tiverton. He was only the third person to be granted such an honour and followed Lord Chancellor Halsbury and the Archbishop of Canterbury, Frederick Temple. The day of celebration included the presentation, a procession, official luncheon, tree planting at People's Park, afternoon sporting events and an evening ball at Blundell's School.

== Family ==
John Coles married, in 1863, Amelia, daughter of Frederick Lermitte, of Twickenham, Middlesex and Jane Pinckard of Winkleigh, Devon. Jane Pinckard was the sister of George Henry Pinckard (1805–1892). They had a family of five sons: Frederick Pinckard Coles; John Howell Coles; Herbert Edwin Coles; George Henry Coles and Edgar Lermitte Coles, and four daughters: Caroline Mary Coles; Emily Amelia Coles; Agnes Lermitte Coles and Ethel Sophia Coles.

== Will ==
John Coles wrote his will on 17 October 1919. He died on 18 October 1919 at Kensington, London. Probate on the estate valued at £461,780 was granted on 26 November 1919. His children were the main beneficiaries except for his son George who had inherited the estate of his godfather and great uncle, George Henry Pinckard, and under the terms of the will had changed his name from George Henry Coles to George Henry Pinckard by Royal Licence.

Other bequests included £1,000 each to Blundell's School for the upkeep of the John Coles Laboratory, the Poplar Hospital for Accidents, and the London Hospital.
