= Cameron Coles =

Scottish cricketer

Personal information
- Full name: Cameron Alan Ross Coles
- Born: 23 May 1974 (age 52); Moura, Queensland, Australia
- Batting: Right-handed
- Bowling: Right-arm off break

Domestic team information
- Years: Team
- 2004: Scotland

Career statistics
| Competition | List A |
|---|---|
| Matches | 2 |
| Runs scored | 7 |
| Batting average | 3.50 |
| 100s/50s | –/– |
| Top score | 5 |
| Catches/stumpings | –/– |
- Source: Cricinfo, 15 July 2022

Cameron Alan Ross Coles (born 23 May 1974) an Australian-born Scottish former cricketer.

Coles was born in May 1974 at Moura, Queensland. Coles moved to Scotland as a child and was educated at St Modan's High School in Stirling. A club cricketer who captained Grange Cricket Club, Coles made two appearances in List A one-day cricket for Scotland in the 2004 totesport League, playing against Worcestershire at Worcester and Nottinghamshire at Trent Bridge. In these two matches, he scored a total of 7 runs with a highest score of 5.
