= Robert Dorsey Coale =

American colonel and scientist (1857–1915)

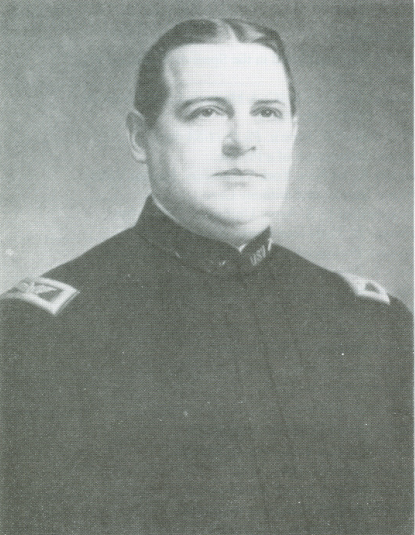
- Coale during the Spanish-American War
- Born: September 17, 1857; Baltimore, Maryland, U.S.
- Died: May 18, 1915 (aged 57); Baltimore, Maryland, U.S.
- Education: Pennsylvania Military Academy; Johns Hopkins University
- Spouse: Minna Howison Coale
- Military career
- Allegiance: United States
- Branch: United States Volunteers
- Service years: 1898
- Rank: Colonel
- Commands: 5th Maryland Volunteer Infantry Regiment
- Conflicts: Spanish–American War
- Other work: professor and Dean at the University of Maryland, Baltimore

Robert Dorsey Coale (1857–1915) was an American colonel in the Spanish–American War, commanding the 5th Maryland Volunteer Infantry Regiment. He was also known as the Professor of Chemistry and Toxicology as well as the Dean of the Physics Faculty at the University of Maryland, Baltimore.

== Education ==
Robert was born on September 17, 1857, at Baltimore, Maryland as the son of Dr. Samuel Buchanan Coale and Caroline Dorsey Coale who was the daughter of Robert Edward Dorsey. He graduated from the Pennsylvania Military Academy in 1875 and later, earned a PhD degree at the Johns Hopkins University in 1876. He also became a Fellow of chemistry in 1880 to 1881.

== Chemistry and Toxicology ==
Coale then became a professor of Chemistry and Toxicology at the University of Maryland, Baltimore and the Dean of the University for 18 years since he served two terms. During this time, while he was described as being kind and generous, he was also known for not speaking as much which some mistook for coldness. Due to this, Coale often performed charitable activities anonymously.

== Military career ==
When the Spanish–American War broke out, Coale volunteered to become Colonel of the 5th Maryland Volunteer Infantry Regiment which was assembled at Pimlico, Maryland on April 25, 1898. However, there were competition between the volunteer regiments over which regiments would see active combat against the Spanish forces. When the 5th Maryland was destined to not be among the chosen volunteer regiments of General William Shafter's V Army Corps, desperate, Coale wrote to General William H. Wilmer, urging that the regiment "be sent to Puerto Rico as its last opportunity to see active service." but before the regiment could see any action, an armistice was signed between the United States and Spain, ending the war. Coale along with his regiment returned to Maryland on October 24 and all members were discharged by December 5, 1898.
